= Swimming at the 1924 Summer Olympics – Men's 1500 metre freestyle =

Men's 1500 metre freestyle at the Games of the VIII Olympiad
- Venue: Piscine des Tourelles
- Date: 13 July 1924 (heats); 14 July 1924 (semifinals); 15 July 1924 (final)
- Competitors: 22 from 12 nations
- Winning time: 20:06.6 WR

Medalists
1st place, gold medalist(s)		Boy Charlton	Australia
2nd place, silver medalist(s)		Arne Borg	Sweden
3rd place, bronze medalist(s)		Frank Beaurepaire	Australia

The men's 1500 metre freestyle was a swimming event held as part of the swimming at the 1924 Summer Olympics programme. It was the fourth appearance of the event, which was established in 1908. The competition was held on Sunday July 13, 1924, on Monday July 14, 1924, and on Tuesday July 15, 1924.

== Records ==
These were the standing world and Olympic records (in minutes) prior to the 1924 Summer Olympics.

World record	21:15.0	(Sweden) Arne Borg	Sydney (AUS)	January 30, 1924
Olympic record	22:00.0	(Canada) George Hodgson	Stockholm (SWE)	July 10, 1912

In the third heat Boy Charlton set a new Olympic record with 21:20.4 minutes, but in the next heat Arne Borg bettered his own world record to 21:11.4 minutes. In the final both swimmers were under the standing world record with Boy Charlton bettered the record by more than a minute to 20:06.6 minutes.

== Results ==
=== Heats ===
Sunday July 13, 1924: The fastest two in each heat and the fastest third-placed from across the heats advanced.

Heat 1

Place	Swimmer	Time	Qual.
1	Harold Annison (GBR)	22:38.4	QQ
2	Adam Smith (USA)	22:48.8	QQ
3	Moss Christie (AUS)	22:49.4	
—	Gustave Klein (FRA)	DNF	
—	Kazuo Onoda (JPN)	DNF	

Heat 2

Place	Swimmer	Time	Qual.
1	Åke Borg (SWE)	22:55.2	QQ
2	John Taylor (GBR)	23:16.6	QQ
3	Kazuo Noda (JPN)	23:44.2	
4	Jean Rebeyrol (FRA)	24:46.4	

Heat 3

Place	Swimmer	Time	Qual.
1	Boy Charlton (AUS)	21:20.4	QQ OR
2	Jack Hatfield (GBR)	22:26.8	QQ
3	Dick Howell (USA)	22:48.2	qq
4	Dionysios Vasilopoulos (GRE)	26:17.4	
—	Ante Roje (YUG)	DNF	

Heat 4

Place	Swimmer	Time	Qual.
1	Arne Borg (SWE)	21:11.4	QQ WR
2	Katsuo Takaishi (JPN)	22:43.2	QQ
3	Luigi Bacigalupo (ITA)	25:04.4	

Heat 5

Place	Swimmer	Time	Qual.
1	Frank Beaurepaire (AUS)	22:17.6	QQ
2	George Vernot (CAN)	23:11.4	QQ
3	Salvator Pellegry (FRA)	24:07.6	
4	Václav Antoš (TCH)	24:44.0	
5	Pedro Méndez (ESP)	26:23.5	

=== Semifinals ===
Monday July 14, 1924: The fastest two in each semi-final and the faster of the two third-placed swimmer advanced to the final.

Semifinal 1

Place	Swimmer	Time	Qual.
1	Boy Charlton (AUS)	21:28.4	QF
2	Arne Borg (SWE)	21:50.8	QF
3	Jack Hatfield (GBR)	21:53.4	qf
4	Adam Smith (USA)	22:39.8	
5	George Vernot (CAN)	23:02.4	
6	John Taylor (GBR)	23:13.8	

Semifinal 2

Place	Swimmer	Time	Qual.
1	Frank Beaurepaire (AUS)	21:41.6	QF
2	Katsuo Takaishi (JPN)	21:48.6	QF
3	Åke Borg (SWE)	21:59.4	
4	Harold Annison (GBR)	23:11.8	
—	Dick Howell (USA)	DNS	

=== Final ===
Tuesday July 15, 1924:

Place	Swimmer	Time
1	Boy Charlton (AUS)	20:06.6 WR
2	Arne Borg (SWE)	20:41.4
3	Frank Beaurepaire (AUS)	21:48.4
4	Jack Hatfield (GBR)	21:55.6
5	Katsuo Takaishi (JPN)	22:10.4
