= Swimming at the 1924 Summer Olympics – Men's 400 metre freestyle =

Men's 400 metre freestyle at the Games of the VIII Olympiad
- Venue: Piscine des Tourelles
- Date: 16 July 1924 (heats); 17 July 1924 (semifinals); 18 July 1924 (final)
- Competitors: 23 from 13 nations
- Winning time: 5:04.2 OR

Medalists
1st place, gold medalist(s)		Johnny Weissmuller; United States
2nd place, silver medalist(s)		Arne Borg; Sweden
3rd place, bronze medalist(s)		Boy Charlton; Australia

The men's 400 metre freestyle was a swimming event held as part of the swimming at the 1924 Summer Olympics programme. It was the fourth appearance of the event, which was established in 1908. The competition was held from Wednesday July 16, 1924 to Friday July 18, 1924.

== Records ==
These were the standing world and Olympic records (in minutes) prior to the 1924 Summer Olympics.

World record	4:57.0	(United States) Johnny Weissmuller	New Haven (USA)	March 6, 1923
Olympic record	5:24.4	(Canada) George Hodgson	Stockholm (SWE)	July 14, 1912

In the first heat Ralph Breyer set a new Olympic record with 5:22.4 minutes, only to be bettered in the third heat by Johnny Weissmuller who set a time of 5:22.2 minutes. Weissmuller improved this record to 5:13.6 minutes in the semi-finals and finally to 5:04.2 minutes in the final.

== Results ==
=== Heats ===
The fastest two in each heat and the fastest third-placed from across the heats advanced.

Heat 1

Place	Swimmer	Time	Qual.
1	Ralph Breyer (USA)	5:22.4	QQ OR
2	Jack Hatfield (GBR)	5:32.6	QQ
3	Atilije Venturini (YUG)	6:28.0	
—	Moss Christie (AUS)	DSQ	

Heat 2

Place	Swimmer	Time	Qual.
1	Åke Borg (SWE)	5:28.2	QQ
2	Václav Antoš (TCH)	5:34.8	QQ
3	Dionysios Vasilopoulos (GRE)	6:21.4	
4	Đura Sentđerđi (YUG)	6:41.4	

Heat 3

Place	Swimmer	Time	Qual.
1	Johnny Weissmuller (USA)	5:22.2	QQ OR
2	Boy Charlton (AUS)	5:30.2	QQ
3	Edward Peter (GBR)	5:38.6	
4	Salvator Pélégry (FRA)	5:56.2	
5	Sjaak Köhler (NED)	6:20.4	

Heat 4

Place	Swimmer	Time	Qual.
1	Arne Borg (SWE)	5:31.8	QQ
2	Frank Beaurepaire (AUS)	5:38.0	QQ
3	Kazuo Noda (JPN)	5:43.8	
4	Alberto Zorrilla (ARG)	5:49.4	
5	Stanislav Bičák (TCH)	5:52.4	

Heat 5

Place	Swimmer	Time	Qual.
1	Lester Smith (USA)	5:32.4	QQ
2	Harold Annison (GBR)	5:32.6	QQ
3	George Vernot (CAN)	5:32.2	qq
4	Édouard Vanzeveren (FRA)	5:59.8	
5	Pedro Méndez (ESP)	6:26.6	

=== Semifinals ===
The fastest two in each semi-final and the faster of the two third-placed swimmer advanced to the final.

Semifinal 1

Place	Swimmer	Time	Qual.
1	Johnny Weissmuller (USA)	5:13.6	QF OR
2	Boy Charlton (AUS)	5:32.6	QF
3	Lester Smith (USA)	5:37.6	
4	George Vernot (CAN)	5:38.0	
5	Václav Antoš (TCH)	5:53.2	
—	Ralph Breyer (USA)	DNS	

Semifinal 2

Place	Swimmer	Time	Qual.
1	Arne Borg (SWE)	5:21.4	QF
2	Åke Borg (SWE)	5:25.0	QF
3	Jack Hatfield (GBR)	5:30.4	qf
4	Harold Annison (GBR)	5:39.4	
—	Frank Beaurepaire (AUS)	DNS	

=== Final ===
Place	Swimmer	Time
1	Johnny Weissmuller (USA)	5:04.2 OR
2	Arne Borg (SWE)	5:05.6
3	Boy Charlton (AUS)	5:06.6
4	Åke Borg (SWE)	5:26.0
5	Jack Hatfield (GBR)	5:32.0
