= Swimming at the 1924 Summer Olympics =

Swimming at the Games of the VIII Olympiad
- Venue: Piscine des Tourelles
- Dates: 13–20 July 1924
- No. of events: 11
- Competitors: 169 from 23 nations

At the 1924 Summer Olympics in Paris, eleven swimming events were contested, six for men and five for women. The competitions were held from Sunday July 13, 1924, to Sunday July 20, 1924.

There were 169 participants from 23 countries competing. The United States team, coached by Bill Bachrach, won 19 of the 33 medals, and 9 of the 11 gold medals.

== Medal table ==
| Rank | Nation | Gold | Silver | Bronze | Total |
|---|---|---|---|---|---|
| 1 | United States | 9 | 5 | 5 | 19 |
| 2 | Great Britain | 1 | 2 | 1 | 4 |
| 3 | Australia | 1 | 1 | 2 | 4 |
| 4 | Sweden | 0 | 2 | 2 | 4 |
| 5 | Belgium | 0 | 1 | 0 | 1 |
| 6 | Hungary | 0 | 0 | 1 | 1 |
| Totals (6 entries) | | 11 | 11 | 11 | 33 |

== Medal summary ==
=== Men's events ===
| Games | Gold | Silver | Bronze |
|---|---|---|---|
| 100 m freestyle | Johnny Weissmuller; United States | Duke Kahanamoku; United States | Samuel Kahanamoku; United States |
| 400 m freestyle | Johnny Weissmuller; United States | Arne Borg; Sweden | Boy Charlton; Australia |
| 1500 m freestyle | Boy Charlton; Australia | Arne Borg; Sweden | Frank Beaurepaire; Australia |
| 100 m backstroke | Warren Kealoha; United States | Paul Wyatt; United States | Károly Bartha; Hungary |
| 200 m breaststroke | Bob Skelton; United States | Joseph De Combe; Belgium | Bill Kirschbaum; United States |
| 4 × 200 m freestyle relay | United States; Ralph Breyer; Harry Glancy; Dick Howell; Wally O'Connor; Johnny Weissmuller | Australia; Frank Beaurepaire; Boy Charlton; Moss Christie; Ernest Henry; Ivan Stedman | Sweden; Åke Borg; Arne Borg; Thor Henning; Gösta Persson; Orvar Trolle; Georg Werner |

=== Women's events ===
| Games | Gold | Silver | Bronze |
|---|---|---|---|
| 100 m freestyle | Ethel Lackie; United States | Mariechen Wehselau; United States | Gertrude Ederle; United States |
| 400 m freestyle | Martha Norelius; United States | Helen Wainwright; United States | Gertrude Ederle; United States |
| 100 m backstroke | Sybil Bauer; United States | Phyllis Harding; Great Britain | Aileen Riggin; United States |
| 200 m breaststroke | Lucy Morton; Great Britain | Agnes Geraghty; United States | Gladys Carson; Great Britain |
| 4 × 100 m freestyle relay | United States; Euphrasia Donnelly; Gertrude Ederle; Ethel Lackie; Mariechen Wehselau | Great Britain; Florence Barker; Constance Jeans; Grace McKenzie; Iris Tanner | Sweden; Aina Berg; Gurli Ewerlund; Wivan Pettersson; Hjördis Töpel |

== Participating nations ==
A total of 169 swimmers (118 men and 51 women) from 23 nations (men from 22 nations - women from 10 nations) competed at the Paris Games:

- Argentina (4) (men:4 women:0)
- Australia (5) (men:5 women:0)
- Belgium (6) (men:6 women:0)
- Canada (2) (men:2 women:0)
- Czechoslovakia (9) (men:6 women:3)
- Denmark (4) (men:0 women:4)
- Finland (2) (men:2 women:0)
- France (20) (men:12 women:8)
- Great Britain (26) (men:15 women:11)
- Greece (1) (men:1 women:0)
- Hungary (6) (men:5 women:1)
- Italy (6) (men:6 women:0)
- Japan (6) (men:6 women:0)
- Luxembourg (4) (men:2 women:2)
- Netherlands (12) (men:8 women:4)
- New Zealand (2) (men:1 women:1)
- Norway (1) (men:1 women:0)
- Portugal (1) (men:1 women:0)
- Spain (4) (men:4 women:0)
- Sweden (14) (men:9 women:5)
- Switzerland (2) (men:2 women:0)
- United States (26) (men:14 women:12)
- Yugoslavia (6) (men:6 women:0)
