= Swimming at the 1924 Summer Olympics – Men's 4 × 200 metre freestyle relay =

Men's 4 × 200 metre freestyle relay at the Games of the VIII Olympiad
- Venue: Piscine des Tourelles
- Date: 18 July 1924 (heats & semifinals); 20 July 1924 (final)
- Competitors: 57 from 13 nations
- Teams: 13
- Winning time: 9:53:4 WR

Medalists
1st place, gold medalist(s)		Ralph Breyer, Harry Glancy, Dick Howell, Wally O'Connor, Lester Smith, Johnny Weissmuller	United States
2nd place, silver medalist(s)		Frank Beaurepaire, Boy Charlton, Moss Christie, Ernest Henry, Ivan Stedman	Australia
3rd place, bronze medalist(s)		Åke Borg, Arne Borg, Thor Henning, Gösta Persson, Orvar Trolle, Georg Werner	Sweden

The men's 4 × 200 metre freestyle relay was a swimming event held as part of the swimming at the 1924 Summer Olympics programme. It was the fourth appearance of the event, which had been established in 1908. The competition was held from Friday to Sunday, 18 to 20 July 1924.

== Records ==
These were the standing world and Olympic records (in minutes) prior to the 1924 Summer Olympics.

World record	10:04.4	(United States) Perry McGillivray (United States) Pua Kealoha (United States) Norman Ross (United States) Duke Kahanamoku	Antwerp (BEL)	29 August 1920
Olympic record	10:04.4	(United States) Perry McGillivray (United States) Pua Kealoha (United States) Norman Ross (United States) Duke Kahanamoku	Antwerp (BEL)	29 August 1920

The United States with the line-up Ralph Breyer, Harry Glancy, Dick Howell, and Wally O'Connor broke the world record and the ten-minute barrier in the semifinal with a time of 9:59.4 minutes. In the final when Johnny Weissmuller replaced Howell, the Americans improved their time again to 9:53.4 minutes.

== Results ==
=== Heats ===
The fastest two teams in each heat and the fastest third-placed from across the heats advanced.

Heat 1

Place	Swimmers	Time	Qual.
1	Ralph Breyer, Harry Glancy, Dick Howell, and Wally O'Connor (USA)	10:41.6	QQ
2	Luigi Bacigalupo, Agostino Frassinetti, Gianni Patrignani, Emilio Polli (ITA)	11:05.2	QQ
3	Ivo Arčanin, Ante Roje, Vlado Smokvina, Atilije Venturini (YUG)	12:02.4	
4	Ramón Berdomás, Pedro Méndez, Julio Peredejordi, José Manuel Pinillo (ESP)	12:02.4	

Heat 2

Place	Swimmers	Time	Qual.
1	Thor Henning, Gösta Persson, Orvar Trolle, Georg Werner (SWE)	11:15.4	QQ
2	Gé Dekker, Otto Hoogesteyn, Sjaak Köhler, Frits Schutte (NED)	11:35.6	QQ

Heat 3

Place	Swimmers	Time	Qual.
1	Moss Christie, Frank Beaurepaire, Ernest Henry, and Ivan Stedman (AUS)	10:21.2	QQ
2	Torahiko Miyahata, Kazuo Noda, Kazuo Onoda, Katsuo Takaishi (JPN)	10:24.2	QQ
3	Václav Antoš, Stanislav Bičák, Viktor Légat, Rudolf Piowatý (TCH)	11:12.8	qq
4	Juan Behrensen, Tomás Jones, Jorge Moreau, Alberto Zorrilla (ARG)	11:25.0	

Heat 4

Place	Swimmers	Time	Qual.
1	Guy Middleton, Henri Padou, Édouard Vanzeveren, Émile Zeibig (FRA)	10:41.4	QQ
2	Harold Annison, Albert Dickin, Edward Peter, Leslie Savage (GBR)	10:52.6	QQ
3	Albert Buydens, Joseph Callens, Emiel Thienpont, Martial van Schelle (BEL)	11:14.8	

=== Semifinals ===
The fastest two teams in each semi-final and the faster of the two third-placed teams advanced to the final.

Sweden replaced Thor Henning and Gösta Persson with Arne Borg and Åke Borg and Great Britain replaced Leslie Savage with John Thomson. Both teams advanced to the final.

Semifinal 1

Place	Swimmers	Time	Qual.
1	Moss Christie, Frank Beaurepaire, Ernest Henry, and Ivan Stedman (AUS)	10:27.0	QF
2	Harold Annison, Albert Dickin, Edward Peter, John Thomson (GBR)	10:31.2	QF
3	Guy Middleton, Henri Padou, Édouard van Zeveren, Émile Zeibig (FRA)	10:39.4	
4	Gé Dekker, Otto Hoogesteyn, Sjaak Köhler, Frits Schutte (NED)	11:29.0	
—	— (TCH)	DNS	

Semifinal 2

Place	Swimmers	Time	Qual.
1	Ralph Breyer, Harry Glancy, Dick Howell, and Wally O'Connor (USA)	9:59.4	QF WR
2	Arne Borg, Åke Borg, Orvar Trolle, Georg Werner (SWE)	10:08.2	QF
3	Torahiko Miyahata, Kazuo Noda, Kazuo Onoda, Katsuo Takaishi (JPN)	10:12.4	qf
4	Luigi Bacigalupo, Agostino Frassinetti, Gianni Patrignani, Emilio Polli (ITA)	11:00.4	

=== Final ===
In the final Johnny Weissmuller replaced Dick Howell in the American team and Boy Charlton replaced Ivan Stedman in the Australian team.

Place	Swimmers	Time
1	Ralph Breyer, Harry Glancy, Wally O'Connor, and Johnny Weissmuller (USA)	9:53.4 WR
2	Boy Charlton, Moss Christie, Frank Beaurepaire, and Ernest Henry (AUS)	10:02.2
3	Arne Borg, Åke Borg, Orvar Trolle, Georg Werner (SWE)	10:06.8
4	Torahiko Miyahata, Kazuo Noda, Kazuo Onoda, Katsuo Takaishi (JPN)	10:15.2
5	Harold Annison, Albert Dickin, Edward Peter, John Thomson (GBR)	10:29.4
