= Australia at the 1924 Summer Olympics =

- IOC code: AUS
- NOC: Australian Olympic Federation

in Paris
- Competitors: 35
- Flag bearer: Edwin Carr
- Medals Ranked 11th: Gold 3 Silver 1 Bronze 2 Total 6

Summer Olympics appearances (overview)
- 1896; 1900; 1904; 1908; 1912; 1920; 1924; 1928; 1932; 1936; 1948; 1952; 1956; 1960; 1964; 1968; 1972; 1976; 1980; 1984; 1988; 1992; 1996; 2000; 2004; 2008; 2012; 2016; 2020; 2024; 2028

Other related appearances
- 1906 Intercalated Games –––– Australasia (1908–1912)

Australia competed at the 1924 Summer Olympics in Paris, France. Australian athletes have competed in every Summer Olympic Games.

== Medalists ==
Medal	Name	Sport	Event	Date
Gold	Nick Winter	Athletics	Men's triple jump	July 12
Gold	Dick Eve	Diving	Men's plain high diving	July 15
Gold	Boy Charlton	Swimming	Men's 1500 m freestyle	July 15
Silver	Frank Beaurepaire, Boy Charlton, Moss Christie, Ernest Henry, Ivan Stedman	Swimming	Men's 4 × 200 m freestyle relay	July 20
Bronze	Boy Charlton	Swimming	Men's 400 m freestyle	July 18
Bronze	Frank Beaurepaire	Swimming	Men's 1500 m freestyle	July 15

== Aquatics ==
=== Diving ===
A single diver represented Australia in 1924. It was the nation's second appearance in the sport. Eve won the gold medal in the plain high diving competition, Australia's first Olympic diving medal. He also finished fifth in the springboard event.

Ranks given are within the heat.

Diver	Event	Semifinals			Final		
Diver	Event	Points	Score	Rank	Points	Score	Rank
Dick Eve	3 m board	13	522.3	2 Q	26	564.3	5
Dick Eve	Plain high diving	13.5	157	1 Q	13.5	160	1st place, gold medalist(s)

=== Swimming ===
Ranks given are within the heat.

Swimmer	Event	Heats		Semifinals		Final	
Swimmer	Event	Result	Rank	Result	Rank	Result	Rank
Frank Beaurepaire	400 m freestyle	5:38.0	2 Q	DNF	—	did not advance	
Frank Beaurepaire	1500 m freestyle	22:17.6	1 Q	21:41.6	1 Q	21:48.4	3rd place, bronze medalist(s)
Boy Charlton	400 m freestyle	5:30.2	2 Q	5:32.6	2 Q	5:06.6	3rd place, bronze medalist(s)
Boy Charlton	1500 m freestyle	21:20.4 OR	1 Q	21:28.4	1 Q	20:06.6 WR	1st place, gold medalist(s)
Moss Christie	100 m freestyle	1:07.2	4	did not advance			
Moss Christie	400 m freestyle	DNF	—	did not advance			
Moss Christie	1500 m freestyle	22:49.4	3	did not advance			
Ernest Henry	100 m freestyle	1:03.8	2 Q	1:03.0	3	did not advance	
Ivan Stedman	100 m freestyle	1:06.2	2 Q	1:06.0	5	did not advance	
Ivan Stedman	200 m breaststroke	3:09.6	4	did not advance			
Frank Beaurepaire; Boy Charlton; Moss Christie; Ernest Henry; Ivan Stedman^{*}	4 × 200 m freestyle relay	10:21.2	1 Q	10:27.0	1 Q	10:02.2	2nd place, silver medalist(s)

^{*} – Indicates athlete swam in the preliminaries but not in the final race.

== Athletics ==
Nine athletes represented Australia in 1924. It was the nation's fifth appearance in the sport (excluding appearances as part of Australasia). Winter took the nation's only athletics medal of the Games, a gold in the triple jump.

Ranks given are within the heat.

Athlete	Event	Heats		Quarterfinals		Semifinals		Final	
Athlete	Event	Result	Rank	Result	Rank	Result	Rank	Result	Rank
Ernie Austen	10 km walk	N/A				Disqualified		did not advance	
Malcolm Boyd	800 m	N/A		Unknown	4	did not advance			
Malcolm Boyd	1500 m	N/A		Unknown	5	did not advance			
Malcolm Boyd	5000 m	N/A		Unknown	9	did not advance			
Slip Carr	100 m	11.0	2 Q	10.9	2 Q	10.7	4	did not advance	
Slip Carr	200 m	22.6	1 Q	21.8	1 Q	22.1	4	did not advance	
Denis Duigan	Pentathlon	N/A						Eliminated-4	
Denis Duigan	Pentathlon	N/A						did not finish	
Richard Honner	400 m	53.1	3	did not advance					
Richard Honner	400 m hurdles	N/A		58.5	4	did not advance			
Richard Honner	Long jump	N/A				6.635	3	did not advance	
Charles Lane	400 m	51.4	3	did not advance					
Jack Newman	800 m	N/A		Unknown	6	did not advance			
Jack Newman	1500 m	N/A		Unknown	5	did not advance			
Roy Norman	200 m	Unknown	2 Q	Unknown	5	did not advance			
Roy Norman	400 m	50.6	2 Q	50.2	4	did not advance			
Roy Norman	800 m	N/A		Unknown	5	did not advance			
Nick Winter	Triple jump	N/A				15.18	1 Q	15.525	1st place, gold medalist(s)

== Boxing ==
Three boxers represented Australia at the 1924 Games. It was the nation's debut in the sport, though an Australian had won a silver medal as part of the 1908 Australasia team. Sinclair was the only Australian to win a match in 1924; none of the Australian boxers advanced past the round of 16.

Boxer	Weight class	Round of 32	Round of 16	Quarterfinals	Semifinals	Final / Bronze match	
Boxer	Weight class	Opposition Score	Opposition Score	Opposition Score	Opposition Score	Opposition Score	Rank
Charles Jardine	Heavyweight	N/A	von Porat (NOR); L	did not advance			9
Raymond Jones	Middleweight	Funk (USA); L	did not advance				17
Charles Sinclair	Lightweight	Huizenaar (NED); W	Genon (BEL); L	did not advance			9

Opponent nation	Wins	Losses	Percent
Belgium	0	1	.000
Netherlands	1	0	1.000
Norway	0	1	.000
United States	0	1	.000
Total	1	3	.250

Round	Wins	Losses	Percent
Round of 32	1	1	.500
Round of 16	0	2	.000
Quarterfinals	0	0	–
Semifinals	0	0	–
Final	0	0	–
Bronze match	0	0	–
Total	1	3	.250

== Cycling ==
Four cyclists represented Australia in 1924. It was the nation's second appearance in the sport.

=== Road cycling ===
Ranks given are within the heat.

Cyclist	Event	Final	
Cyclist	Event	Result	Rank
Sidney Ramsden	Time trial	7:18:23.4	36

=== Track cycling ===
Ranks given are within the heat.

Cyclist	Event	First round		First repechage		Quarterfinals		Second repechage		Semifinals		Final	
Cyclist	Event	Result	Rank	Result	Rank	Result	Rank	Result	Rank	Result	Rank	Result	Rank
Robert Broadbent	50 km	N/A										Unknown	8–36
Walter Coppins	50 km	N/A										Unknown	8–36
Walter Coppins	Sprint	13.6	1 Q	Advanced directly		Unknown	3 r	Unknown	3	did not advance			
George Dempsey	50 km	N/A										Unknown	8–36
George Dempsey	Sprint	13.8	1 Q	Advanced directly		13.2	1 Q	Advanced directly		Unknown	2	did not advance	

== Rowing ==
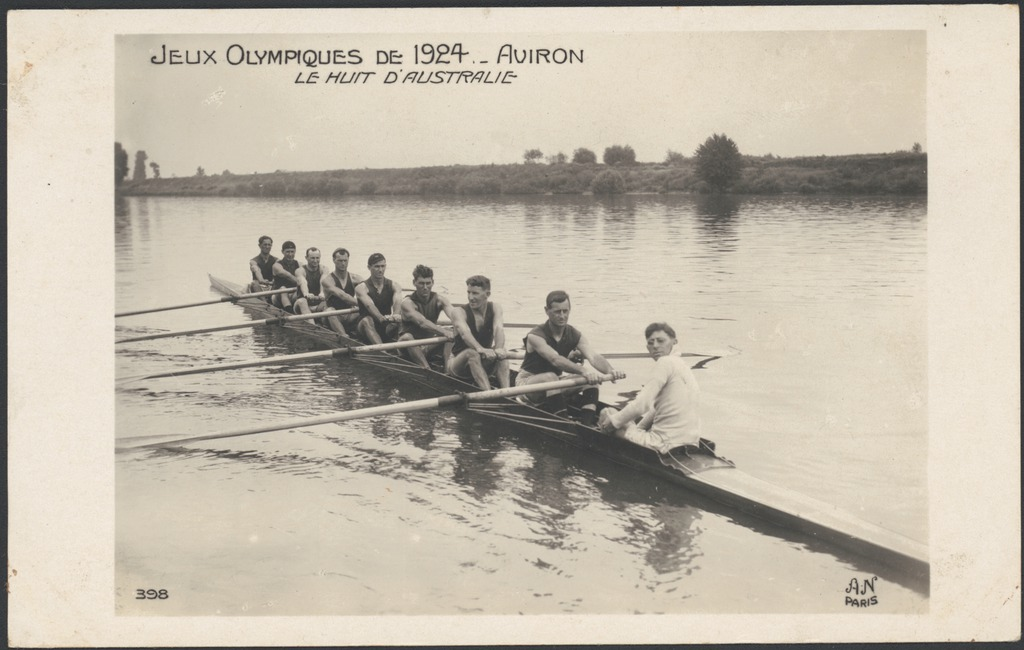
The Australian eight in Paris

Ten rowers represented Australia in 1924. It was the nation's debut in the sport, though the 1912 Australasia team included rowers.

Ranks given are within the heat.

Rower	Event	Semifinals		Repechage		Final	
Rower	Event	Result	Rank	Result	Rank	Result	Rank
Arthur Bull	Single sculls	7:19.0	1 Q	Advanced directly		Did not finish	4
Frank Cummings; Robert Cummings; Herbert Graetz; Walter Jarvis; Walter Pfeiffer; Arthur Scott; William Sladden; Alf Taeuber; Ted Thomas	Eight	Unknown	2 r	6:47.0	3	did not advance	

== Tennis ==
Men

Athlete	Event	Round of 128	Round of 64	Round of 32	Round of 16	Quarterfinals	Semifinals	Final	
Athlete	Event	Opposition Score	Opposition Score	Opposition Score	Opposition Score	Opposition Score	Opposition Score	Opposition Score	Rank
James Bayley	Singles	Schildt (FIN); W 6–1, 6–3, 6–4	Bache (DEN); W 6–2, 6–1, 6–2	Gilbert (GBR); L 5–7, 7–9, 1–6	did not advance				
James Willard	Singles	Raymond (RSA); W 2–6, 6–4, 6–4, 2–6, 6–4	Halot (BEL); W 8–6, 6–2, 6–2	Jacob (IND); L 1–6, 2–6, 6–3, 6–2, 3–6	did not advance				
James Bayley; James Willard	Doubles	—N/a	von Kehrling / von Kelemen (HUN); W 6–8, 11–9, 3–6, 6–3, 6–2	Richards / Hunter (USA); L 1–6, 2–6, 2–6	did not advance				

== Wrestling ==
=== Freestyle wrestling ===
Men's

Athlete	Event	Round of 32	Round of 16	Quarterfinal	Semifinal	Final	
Athlete	Event	Opposition Result	Opposition Result	Opposition Result	Opposition Result	Opposition Result	Rank
Claude Angelo	Featherweight	Bye	Stott (GBR); W	Chilcott (CAN); L	did not advance		
