= Tom Robinson (swim coach) =

American swimming coach

Thomas H. Robinson
- Robinson in 1928 Northwestern Publication

Biographical details
- Born: August 18, 1882; Denmark
- Died: August 11, 1958 (aged 75); Waukegan, Illinois, U.S.

Coaching career (HC unless noted)
- 1909–1944: Northwestern University

Accomplishments and honors

Championships
- 10 Big 10 Championships including 1914–1919; 6 NCAA Championships; 7 water polo titles 3 water basketball championships

Awards
- Northwestern U. Hall of Fame

Thomas H. Robinson (August 18, 1882 – August 11, 1958) served 35 years as Northwestern University's first swimming and diving coach from 1909 to 1944. During his coaching tenure, his teams won 10 Big Ten Conference Championships, and 6 NCAA Championships. With multiple responsibilities, his teams won seven water polo championships during his time at Northwestern, and he served briefly as basketball coach in 1919. He placed eleven of his swimmers, divers, and water polo players on Olympic teams, and was made a member of both the International Swimming Hall of Fame in 1965 and the American Swimming Coaches Association (ASCAA) Hall of Fame.

Robinson was born on August 18, 1882, in Denmark. He competed in the Central AAU Swimming Championship in the plunge for distance in late September 1906 while representing the Evanston YMCA.

== Northwestern University ==
Robinson coached swimming at the Evanston YMCA as early as 1907. He began coaching at Northwestern at the age of 27 in 1909, beginning initially as the University's first swimming instructor, and continued his coaching career through 1944. He made an early requirement that all students should pass a swimming test verifying basic swimming ability. In the summer of 1910, and in subsequent years, he provided basic swimming instruction for the Evanston YMCA, initially at the Dempster Street Beach, and continued summer coaching instruction throughout his time at Northwestern, eventually providing instruction to thousands of Evanston residents. Robinson furthered the development of the Australian crawl in collegiate swimming whose adoption in American competition began in the early 1900's. The crawl stroke, first adopted by British swimmer John Arthur Trudgen which featured a slower scissor kick, was further improved by the Australian champion swimmer Richmond "Dick" Cavill (the son of swimming instructor Professor Richard "Frederick" Cavill), who replaced the slower scissor kick with the flutter kick to improve efficiency.

Robinson married the former Gertrude Dietsch of Evanston on November 26, 1910, and the couple lived in Evanston through 1941, when they moved to Barrington, Illinois. They had one daughter and one son.

Robinson won his first Big Ten conference championship in 1914 and continued to win consecutive conference championships through 1918. He captured additional championships in 1920, 23, 24, 25, and 1930. He captured his first NCAA Championship in 1924 at Scott Natatorium in Annapolis, Maryland, the first year of the NCAA national tournament, where his swimmers Ralph Breyer, and Dick Howell won the 100, 200, 400, and 1500 freestyle events. He won additional titles in 1925, 1928, 1930, and 1933. While at Northwestern, he also won seven water polo championships under his tenure, and three water basketball championships, a game Robinson helped develop, but which fell out of favor by 1924. In 1920, Robinson established and set up the first women’s Red Cross Lifesaving Program.

On February 28, 1924, having already won several championships, Robinson was honored by Northwestern in recognition of his 25-years of service of coaching swimming and water polo by a Silver Anniversary testimonial banquet hosted by the University. Robinson began coaching in the first years of the pool at the new Patton Gymnasium. Present to honor Robinson were Northwestern President Walter Dill Scott, Mayor Charles H. Barlett, and other civic leaders. Robinson was presented with a silver service set, and a plaque that was placed at the entrance to the Northwestern pool that commemorated his silver anniversary.

=== Water basketball inventor ===
In his earliest year of coaching, in 1907 Robinson invented Water Basketball while serving at the Evanston YMCA. During initial years at Northwestern, water basketball participation grew from Chicago to much of the Midwest and eventually nationwide. Athletic clubs in Chicago became the earliest to take up the new sport. Robinson began to stage water basketball opening games before Big Ten swimming events at Northwestern, exhibiting the new sport to other teams.

By 1913, the Big Ten Conference dropped water polo and for a period made water basketball part of men's swim meets in 1914. Games were played in two ten minute halves, with a basket earning one point. In the years from 1914 through 1918, the Northwestern water basketball team outscored the teams in played against by 166–55. Northwestern won the water polo intercollegiate championship in 1924, the only year that water basketball was included in the championship. By 1925 water polo replaced the sport on college campuses as water basketball was never adopted by the Olympic committee, and collegiate water polo teams were necessary for the U.S. to build teams that could compete at the sport in the Olympics.

=== Outstanding swimmers coached ===
Among Robinson's most outstanding swimmers were 1924 Olympians Dick Howell, Ralph Breyer, and gold medalists Robert Skelton, and Sybil Bauer. Other Olympians he mentored and trained included 1928 Olympians Harry C. Daniels, a water polo player and swimmer, Walter Colbath, and 1932 Olympic gold medalist Al Schwartz. He later coached 1936 Olympic freestyle participant Art Highland, and 1936 Olympic trial qualifier Volney Wilson, a physics student who helped evolve the butterfly stroke to include the dolphin kick. He also coached 1932 Olympic freestyle participant Dan Zehr.

He retired from coaching at Northwestern in 1944. In his retirement, he coached for a few years as a volunteer at North Park Pool. He later coached at Elgin Pool, and served as a swimming instructor at Barrington Hills. He died on August 12, 1958, at the Lake County Tuberculosis sanatorium, in Waukegan, Illinois and was survived by his wife, a daughter and a son. He had been in ill health for around six months, since February, 1958. Services were held at the Barrington Methodist Church on August 14.
