= William MacDonald (serial killer) =

British-born Australian serial killer (1924–2015)

- Born: Allen Ginsberg; 17 June 1924; Liverpool, England, UK
- Died: 12 May 2015 (aged 90); Prince of Wales Hospital, Randwick, New South Wales, Australia
- Other names: "The (Sydney) Mutilator"; Alan Edward Brennan; David Alan (assumed names)
- Penalty: Life imprisonment

Details
- Victims: 5
- Span of crimes: 1961–1962
- Country: Australia
- States: Queensland; New South Wales
- Date apprehended: May 1963
- Military career
- Allegiance: Great Britain
- Branch: British Army
- Service years: 1943–1947

William MacDonald (17 June 1924 – 12 May 2015) was an English serial killer responsible for the murders of five people in the Australian states of Queensland and New South Wales between 1961 and 1962.

A British citizen, MacDonald immigrated to Australia in 1955. Between 1961 and 1962, MacDonald terrorised Sydney, committing a string of gruesome murders before being apprehended while working as a porter at Melbourne's Spencer Street railway station on 13 May 1963. His modus operandi was to select his male victims at random (mostly derelicts), lure them into a dark place, violently punch and stab them with a long bladed knife dozens of times about the head and neck, and finally sever their genitals. Due to his gruesome style of murdering victims, he was given the nickname The Mutilator by the media.

== Early life ==
MacDonald was born Allen Ginsberg in Liverpool, England, as the second of three children to a Jewish family. The Ginsbergs were reportedly wealthy and well-to-do, but MacDonald was considered anti-social from an early age and emotionally neglected by his parents.

In 1943, at the age of 19, MacDonald was enlisted in the army and transferred to the Lancashire Fusiliers. One night, MacDonald was raped in an air-raid shelter by one of his corporals. The experience traumatised him, and the thought preyed on his mind for the rest of his life. Discharged from the army in 1947, he was diagnosed as having schizophrenia and committed for several months to a mental asylum where daily he was treated with electroconvulsive therapy.

MacDonald changed his name, then emigrated from England to Canada in 1949 and then to Australia in 1955. Shortly after his arrival, he was arrested and charged for touching a detective's penis in a public toilet in Adelaide. For this he was placed on a two-year good behavior bond. After moving to Ballarat, MacDonald then moved to Sydney in 1961 as a construction worker. He found accommodation in East Sydney, where he became well known in the parks and public toilets that were surreptitious meeting places for homosexual men, due to the criminalisation of same-sex sexual activity.

== Crimes ==
=== First victim ===
The murders began in Brisbane in 1961. MacDonald befriended a 63-year-old man named Amos Hugh Hurst outside the Roma Street Railway Station. After a long drinking session at one of the local pubs, they went back to Hurst's apartment where they consumed more alcohol. When Hurst became intoxicated MacDonald began to strangle him. Hurst was so intoxicated that he did not realise what was happening and eventually began to haemorrhage. Blood poured from his mouth and on to MacDonald's hands. MacDonald then punched Hurst in the face, killing him. MacDonald then placed Hurst onto his bed, took off his trousers and shoes and pulled the sheets up over Hurst's head and tucked them in around all sides. MacDonald then waited there a while then turned off the lights and left the apartment.

=== Second victim ===
On 4 June 1961, police were summoned to the Sydney Domain Baths. A man's nude corpse had been found, savagely stabbed over 30 times, and with the genitalia completely severed from his body. Alfred Reginald Greenfield became the second victim claimed by the killer soon to be dubbed "the Mutilator".

Greenfield, 41, had been sitting on a park bench in Green Park, just across the road from St Vincent's Hospital in Darlinghurst. MacDonald offered Greenfield a drink and lured him to the nearby Domain Baths on the pretext of providing more alcohol. MacDonald waited until Greenfield fell asleep, then removed his knife from its sheath and stabbed him approximately 30 times. The ferocity of the first blow severed the arteries in Greenfield's neck. MacDonald then pulled down Greenfield's trousers and underwear, severed his genitals, put them in a plastic bag and threw them into Sydney Harbour.

=== Third victim ===
Similar to the second victim, Ernest William Cobbin, a 37-year-old male (possibly 36 or 37 years old) was stabbed repeatedly and mutilated. His body was found in a public toilet at Moore Park.

On this night, MacDonald was walking down South Dowling Street where he met Cobbin. MacDonald lured his victim to Moore Park and drank beer with him in a public toilet. Just before the attack, MacDonald put on his plastic raincoat. Cobbin was sitting on the toilet seat when MacDonald, using an uppercut motion, struck Cobbin in the neck with a knife, severing his jugular vein. Blood splattered all over MacDonald's arms, face and his plastic raincoat. Cobbin tried to defend himself by raising his arms. MacDonald continued to stab his victim multiple times, covering the toilet cubicle with blood. MacDonald then severed the victim's genitals, placed them into a plastic bag along with his knife, and departed the scene. On the way home MacDonald washed the blood off his hands and face.

=== Fourth victim ===
On 31 March 1962, in suburban Darlinghurst, New South Wales, the mortally wounded Frank Gladstone McLean was found by a man walking with his wife and young child. He was the victim of an unfinished assault committed by MacDonald. The man found McLean still breathing, but bleeding heavily, and went to get police.

On this day MacDonald bought a knife from a sports store in Sydney. That night MacDonald left the Oxford Hotel in Darlinghurst and followed McLean down Bourke Street past the local police station. MacDonald initiated conversation with McLean and suggested they have a drinking session around the corner in Bourke Lane. As they entered Bourke Lane, MacDonald plunged his knife into McLean's throat. McLean tried to fight off the attack but he was too intoxicated to do so. He was then stabbed again in the face and punched—forcing him off balance. The assault was interrupted by a young family approaching. MacDonald hid himself on hearing the voices and the sound of a baby's cry. Once the man and his family had left, MacDonald returned to the barely-alive McLean, pulled him further into the lane and stabbed him again. A total of six stab wounds were inflicted. He then pulled down McLean's trousers, sliced off his genitals and put them into a plastic bag which he took home and disposed of the next day.

The police at one stage thought that the killer could have been a deranged surgeon. The manner in which McLean's genitals were removed seemed to be done by someone with years of surgical experience. Doctors at one stage found themselves under investigation.

=== Fifth victim ===
After being dismissed from his job at the local post office, where he had been hired as a letter sorter under the assumed name of Alan Edward Brennan, MacDonald went into business for himself. He purchased a mixed business store on Burwood Road in Concord, again under the assumed name of Brennan. Here, he intended to sell sandwiches and smallgoods, living in rooms above the store. He actually lived there for only about a week after paying the purchase deposit.

On the night of Saturday 6 June 1962, MacDonald went to a wine saloon in Pitt Street, Sydney, where he met 37-year-old Patrick Joseph Hackett, a thief and derelict who had just recently been released from prison. They went back to MacDonald's new residence where they continued to drink alcohol. After a short period, Hackett fell asleep on the floor. MacDonald then got out a boning knife that he used in his delicatessen. He stabbed Hackett in the neck, the blow passing straight through. After the first blow, Hackett woke up and tried to shield himself, pushing the knife back into MacDonald's other hand and cutting it severely. MacDonald then unleashed a renewed attack, eventually striking the knife into Hackett's heart, killing him instantly. He continued to stab his victim until he had to stop for breath. Hackett's blood was splattered all over the walls and floor.

The knife having become blunted, MacDonald was unable to sever his victim's genitals and fell asleep. When he awoke the following morning he found himself lying next to the victim's body covered in sticky, drying blood. The pools of blood had soaked through the floorboards and almost on to the counter in his shop downstairs. He cleaned himself and went to a hospital to have the wound in his hand stitched. He told the doctor that he had cut himself in his shop. After cleaning up the blood, MacDonald dragged Hackett's corpse underneath his shop. Believing the police would soon come looking for his victim, he fled to Brisbane.

Three weeks later, neighbours noticed a putrid smell coming from the shop and called the health department, who in turn called the police. On 20 November 1962 police discovered the rotting corpse, which was too badly decomposed to be identified. An autopsy determined that the body was of someone in their forties, which tallied with records of the missing shop owner, Brennan (MacDonald's alias). In late July, the police had still made no connection between the case and the three previous Mutilator killings, and had profiled the killer as operating in Sydney's inner eastern suburbs, which were many miles distant from Concord.

=== The "Case of the walking corpse" ===
After investigations, the victim was incorrectly identified as Brennan and a notice published in a newspaper obituary column. This was read by his former workmates at the local post office, who attended a small memorial service conducted by a local funeral director. At this time, MacDonald was living in Brisbane and then moved to New Zealand, believing that the police would still be looking for him. He felt the need to kill again, but for some reason he had to return to Sydney to do it. Returning to Sydney, he met former workmate John McCarthy, who said, "I believed you had died," at which MacDonald replied, "Leave me alone," and ran away, travelling to Melbourne soon after.

McCarthy went straight to the police. At first they did not believe him and accused him of having had too much to drink and he was told to go home and sleep it off. They even said that he was crazy. He went back again the next day and tried to explain what had happened, but they still didn't believe him. This persuaded McCarthy to go to the Daily Mirror newspaper where he spoke to crime reporter Joe Morris. McCarthy explained how he bumped into the "supposed to be dead" Brennan. The reporter saw the account as credible and filed a story under the headline "Case of the walking corpse". Publication forced the police to exhume the corpse. The fingerprints identified the body as belonging to Hackett and not MacDonald. Closer examination found that the body had several stab wounds and mutilation of the penis and testicles, potentially linking the crime to the notorious Mutilator.

== Capture, trial and sentencing ==
The Sydney police obtained an identikit picture of MacDonald, which was circulated to every newspaper in the nation. MacDonald had taken a job on the Melbourne railways, being hired as "David Allan". Even though he tried to disguise himself by dyeing his hair and growing a moustache, he was instantly recognised by his workmates. Melbourne police arrested him as he collected his pay for that week.

Under questioning, MacDonald readily admitted to the killings, blaming them on an irresistible urge to kill. He claimed he was the victim of rape as a teenager, and had to disempower the victims chosen at random. A man with schizophrenia, MacDonald said that he heard voices in his head telling him that his victims were the corporal who raped him as a teenager. He was charged with five counts of murder and committed for trial on 15 August 1963. The trial began in September 1963 and was one of the nation's most sensational. MacDonald pleaded not guilty on the grounds of insanity and testified in great detail to the gruesome murders. He told the court of how blood had sprayed over his raincoat as he castrated his victims, put their private parts into plastic bags and took them home. He even told the court what he did with the genitals once he got home. Some jurors fainted and had to be taken from the court. The jury chose to ignore overwhelming evidence for insanity in handing down a 'guilty' verdict, which amazed expert psychiatrists. Before passing sentence, Justice McLennan said that this was the most barbaric case of murder and total disregard for human life that had come before him in his many years on the bench. MacDonald showed no signs of remorse and made it quite clear that, if he were free, he would go on killing. He was sentenced to five consecutive life sentences with the strong recommendation that he never be released.

== Imprisonment ==
MacDonald was imprisoned at Long Bay Hospital, a division of Long Bay Correctional Centre, but was soon certified as insane and transferred to a secure mental hospital. In the prison system, MacDonald was known simply as Bill; he had been in prison for so long that he became institutionalised, the longest continuous serving inmate in the New South Wales prison system. He stated in 2003 "I have no desire to go and live on the outside. I wouldn't last five minutes."

== Death ==
At the age of 90, MacDonald died from a gastrointestinal blockage on 12 May 2015, while he was still imprisoned. At the time of his death, MacDonald was the oldest and longest-serving prisoner in custody in New South Wales.

== See also ==
- Cycle of violence
- List of serial killers by country
