= Gianni Patrignani =

Italian swimmer

Personal information
- Born: 31 January 1906 Pesaro, Italy
- Died: 2 August 1991 (aged 85)

Sport
- Sport: Swimming

Gianni Patrignani (31 January 1906 – 2 August 1991) was an Italian swimmer. He competed in the men's 4 × 200 metre freestyle relay event at the 1924 Summer Olympics.
