= Emiel Thienpont =

Belgian swimmer

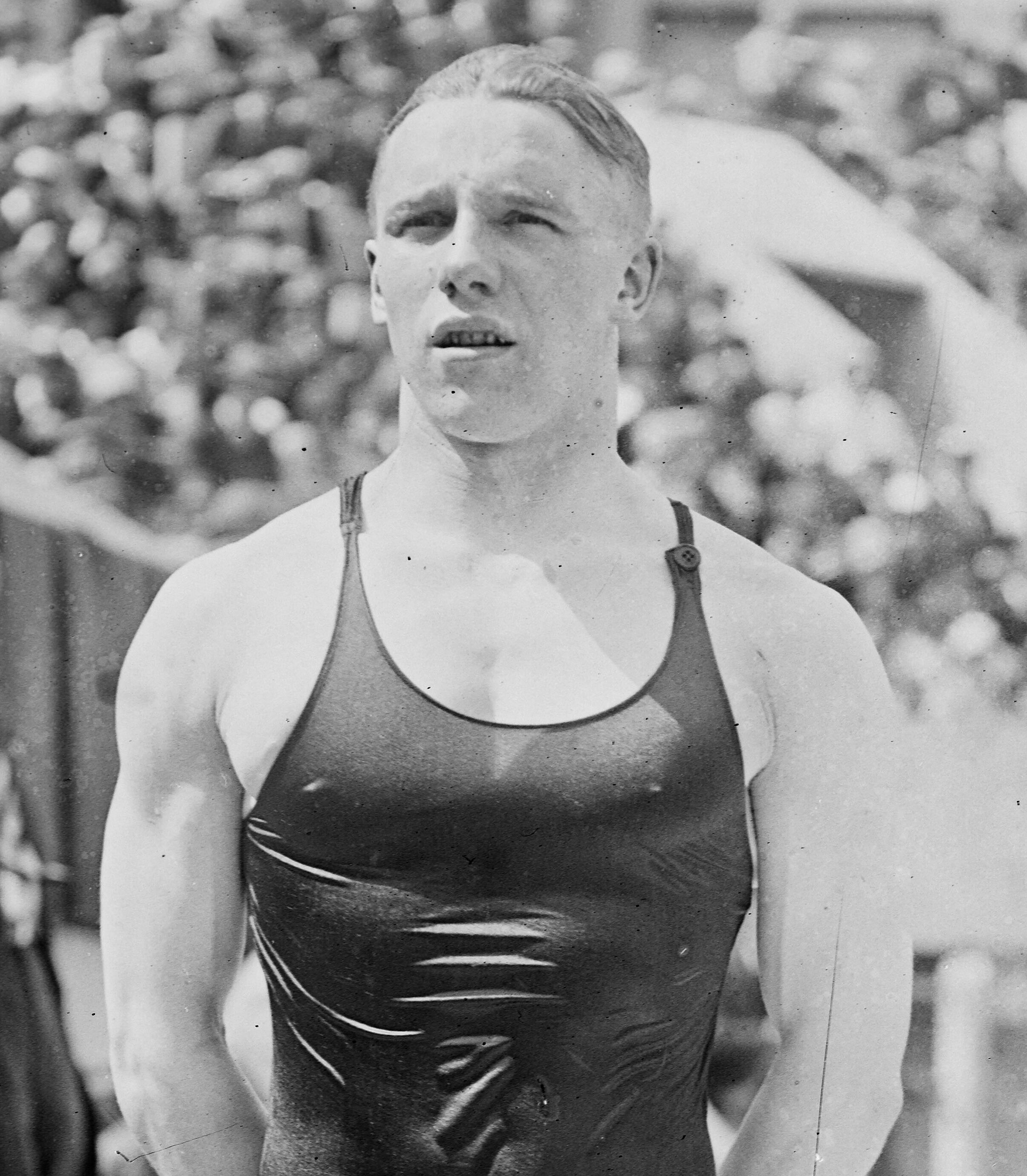
- Emiel Thienpont in 1927

Personal information
- Born: 31 August 1904
- Died: 13 August 1978 (aged 73)

Sport
- Sport: Swimming

Emiel Thienpont (31 August 1904 – 13 August 1978) was a Belgian swimmer. He competed in the men's 4 × 200 metre freestyle relay event at the 1924 Summer Olympics.
