= Frits Schutte =

Dutch swimmer

Personal information
- Nationality: Dutch
- Born: 3 September 1897 Amsterdam, Netherlands
- Died: 4 January 1986 (aged 88) Leersum, Netherlands

Sport
- Sport: Swimming

Frits Schutte (3 September 1897 – 4 January 1986) was a Dutch swimmer. He competed in the men's 4 × 200 metre freestyle relay event at the 1924 Summer Olympics.
