= Ramón Berdomás =

Spanish swimmer (1900–1963)

Personal information
- Born: 24 April 1900 Barcelona, Spain
- Died: 19 April 1963 (aged 62) Barcelona, Spain

Sport
- Sport: Swimming

Ramón Berdomás (24 April 1900 – 19 April 1963) was a Spanish swimmer. He competed in the water polo at the 1920 Summer Olympics and the men's 4 × 200 metre freestyle relay event at the 1924 Summer Olympics.
