= Václav Antoš =

Czech swimmer (1905–1978)

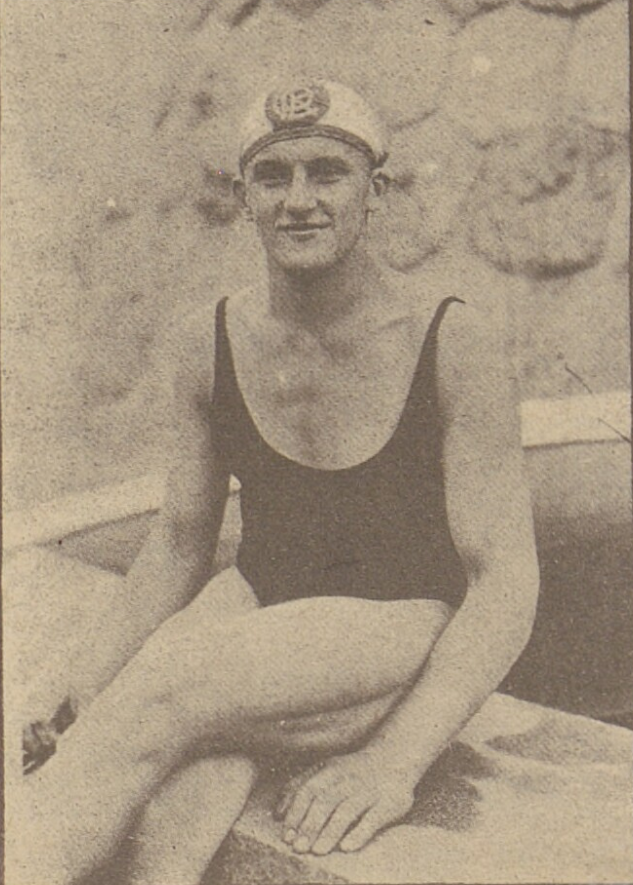
- Antoš in 1924

Personal information
- Born: 19 January 1905 Prague, Austria-Hungary
- Died: 23 January 1978 (aged 73) Prague, Czechoslovakia

Sport
- Sport: Swimming
Medal record
Representing Czechoslovakia
European Championships
Bronze medal – third place	1927 Bologna	400 m freestyle

Václav Antoš (19 January 1905 – 23 January 1978) was a Czech freestyle swimmer who competed for Czechoslovakia in the 1924 Summer Olympics and in the 1928 Summer Olympics.

In 1924 he was eliminated in the semi-finals of the 400 metre freestyle event. In the 1500 metre freestyle competition he was eliminated in the first round. He was also a member of the Czechoslovak team which qualified for the semi-finals of the 4×200 metre freestyle relay event but did not compete in that round. Four years later he was eliminated in the first round of the 400 metre freestyle event as well as of the 1500 metre freestyle competition.
