= Dick Howell =

American swimmer

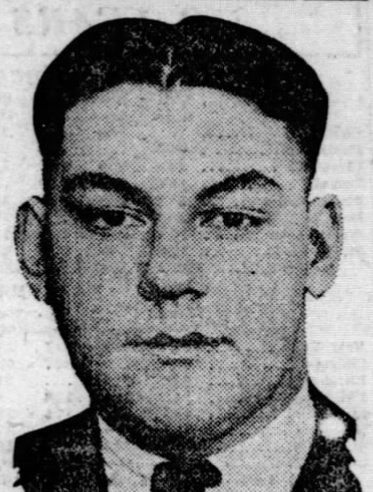
- Howell, circa 1920

Personal information
- Full name: Richard Elm Howell, Sr.
- National team: United States
- Born: October 12, 1903 Chicago, Illinois, U.S.
- Died: July 20, 1967 (aged 63) Arlington Heights, Illinois, U.S.
- Height: 6 ft 6 in (1.98 m)
- Spouse: Elizabeth Fletcher
- Children: 3

Sport
- Sport: Swimming
- Strokes: Freestyle
- Club: Sinai Social Center; Illinois Athletic Club
- College team: Northwestern University
- Coach: Tom Robinson (Northwestern)

Richard Elm Howell Sr. (October 12, 1903 – July 20, 1967) was an American competition swimmer who competed for Northwestern University and represented the United States at the 1924 Summer Olympics in Paris. His 1924 Paris Olympic 4x200 relay team with whom he competed in a preliminary heat set a world record of 9:59.4. He would set three NCAA national collegiate titles while swimming for Northwestern University through 1926.

== Early life and swimming ==
Howell was born in Chicago, Illinois to Frances and Mary Elm Howell on October 12, 1903. He attended Hyde Park High School in Chicago, and set several national high school records while representing Hyde Park, though by most accounts he did not excel in his times until his High School Junior and Senior year. In the Cook County Interscholastic Championship in Chicago in early December 1922, representing the Hyde Park High Swim Team, Howell swam a :55.8 in the 100-yard freestyle. He graduated Hyde Park around 1922. In a December 1922, City-wide Interscholastic Championship, Howell swam a :57.4 for the 100-yard event, and a 2:26 for the 220-yard event, setting interscholastic records in both events.

Howell did much of his training with the Sinai Social Center, later known as the Emil Hirsch Center, under Coach George Eckert from around 1918-1920, where in August of 1920, he won the Senior 440-yard race with a time of 5:50.4, setting a record at the Amateur Athletic Federation (AAF) Championship at McKinley Park. Eckert, of German-Jewish ancestry, coached at Chicago area's Sinai Center from 1916-1930, before coaching at Chicago's Shawnee Country Club. By 1920, Howell held AAF records in 100, 200, 400, and 880-yard swim events. Around 1920, Howell served as President of the Senior division for the Sinai Social Center's swimming association.

By 1923, Howell had also competed while representing the exceptional program provided by the Illinois Athletic Club (IAC) where he swam the 440-yard freestyle event in 5:03.8 in March 1923, breaking Johnny Weissmuller's world record for a 60-yard pool by 1.4 seconds. Weissmuller, who also swam for the Illinois Athletic Club, would later replace him in the finals of the 4x200 freestyle relay at the Paris Olympics in July 1924. At the IAC, Howell was coached and mentored by Hall of Fame Coach Bill Bachrach, who would serve as head swimming coach for the U.S. Olympic Swimming team at the 1924 Olympics. In August, 1922, Howell won the 2.5 mile swim marathon in the Chicago River defeating Olympic swimmer Norman Ross.

== 1924 Paris Olympics ==
As a 20-year-old at the July, 1924 Olympics, he swam for the gold-medal-winning American relay team in the men's 4×200-meter freestyle relay, though he did not swim in the event final, and was not awarded a gold medal, in conformance with the 1924 Olympic rules. After swimming in the preliminary heats and semifinals and helping the American relay team qualify for the final, he was replaced by Johnny Weissmuller. In the semifinals he was a member of the team that set a new world record of 9:59.4, breaking the ten-minute barrier in the event for the first time. One of his teammates on the 4×200 Olympic relay team was Ralph Breyer who had swum with him at Northwestern.

Howell also competed in the 1924 Olympic men's 1,500-meter freestyle; he qualified for the semi-finals with a 22:48.2 but did not advance.

== Northwestern University ==
After high school, he enrolled at Northwestern University in Evanston, Illinois, where he swam for the Northwestern Wildcats swimming and diving team in National Collegiate Athletic Association (NCAA) and Big Ten Conference competition from 1922 to 1926. Competing as a Wildcat, he won three NCAA national collegiate titles including the 400- and 1500-meter freestyle events in 1924 and the 220-yard freestyle in 1925, setting a few conference records. He also captured four Big Ten titles, and set ten Big Ten freestyle records. Remembered as one of Northwestern's all-time greatest swimmers, Howell was also a member of three intercollegiate championship water polo teams and wrestled while at Northwestern. He was a member of the Northwestern teams that won the NCAA Championships and Big 10 conference in 1924 and 1925. In his final year as a Northwestern undergraduate, Howell married fellow student Elizabeth Fletcher.

He married Elizabeth Ann Fletcher on February 9, 1926 in the Chicago area, and the couple had two sons and a daughter. Fletcher was a Northwestern student when they met. Howell, after a suspension from Northwestern for marrying a Coed without parental sanction, did not return to Northwestern in 1926.

At the AAU Sr. Indoor Championships on February 16, 1927 in Chicago, he broke what was considered the world plunging record for 60-foot pools by covering a 57-yard distance in 14.4 seconds.

A resident of Wilmette, Howell died in nearby Arlington Heights, Illinois on July 20, 1967. Services were held in Wilmette's St. Augustine Episcopal Church on July 22. He was survived by his wife the former Elizabeth Ann Fletcher, two sons, a daughter, and grandchildren.

== See also ==
- List of Northwestern University alumni
- List of Olympic medalists in swimming (men)

Records
Preceded by Perry McGillivray, Pua Kealoha, Norman Ross, Duke Kahanamoku	Men's 4×200-meter freestyle relay world record-holder July 18, 1924 – July 20, 1924; Ralph Breyer, Harry Glancy, Dick Howell, Wally O'Connor	Succeeded by Ralph Breyer, Harry Glancy, Wally O'Connor, Johnny Weissmuller
