= Jean Rebeyrol =

French swimmer

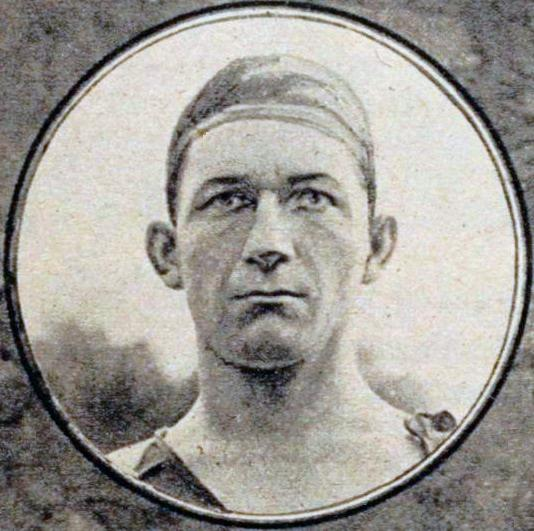

Personal information
- Born: 14 October 1903 Bordeaux, France
- Died: 25 August 1975 (aged 71) Pessac, France

Sport
- Sport: Swimming

Jean Rebeyrol (14 October 1903 – 25 August 1975) was a French swimmer. He competed in the men's 1500 metre freestyle event at the 1924 Summer Olympics.
