= Orvar Trolle =

Swedish swimmer

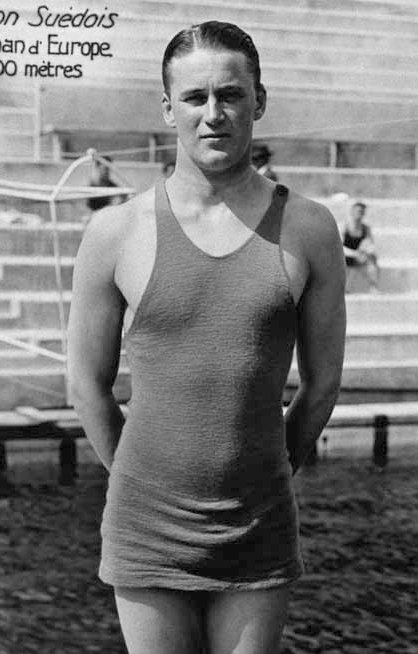
- Trolle at the 1924 Olympics

Personal information
- Born: 4 April 1900 Malmö, Sweden-Norway
- Died: 7 March 1971 (aged 70) Blikstorp, Sweden

Sport
- Sport: Swimming
- Strokes: Freestyle
- Club: Malmö SS; SoIK Hellas
Medal record
Representing Sweden
Olympic Games
Bronze medal – third place	1924 Paris	4×200 m freestyle relay

Nils Orvar Trolle (4 April 1900 – 7 March 1971) was a Swedish freestyle swimmer. He competed in the 100m and 4 × 200 m events at the 1920 and 1924 Olympics; he won a bronze medal in the relay in 1924 and finished fourth in 1920. He failed to reach the finals of the individual 100m freestyle. In 1923–24, he competed for Illinois AC while studying in the United States, and in 1940–44, he headed his native club Malmö SS.
