= Otto Hoogesteyn =

Dutch swimmer

Personal information
- Nationality: Dutch
- Born: 11 January 1903 Mainz-Kostheim, Germany
- Died: 7 June 1966 (aged 63) Utrecht, Netherlands

Sport
- Sport: Swimming

Otto Hoogesteyn (11 January 1903 – 7 June 1966) was a Dutch swimmer. He competed in the men's 4 × 200 metre freestyle relay event at the 1924 Summer Olympics.
