= Guy Middleton (swimmer) =

French swimmer

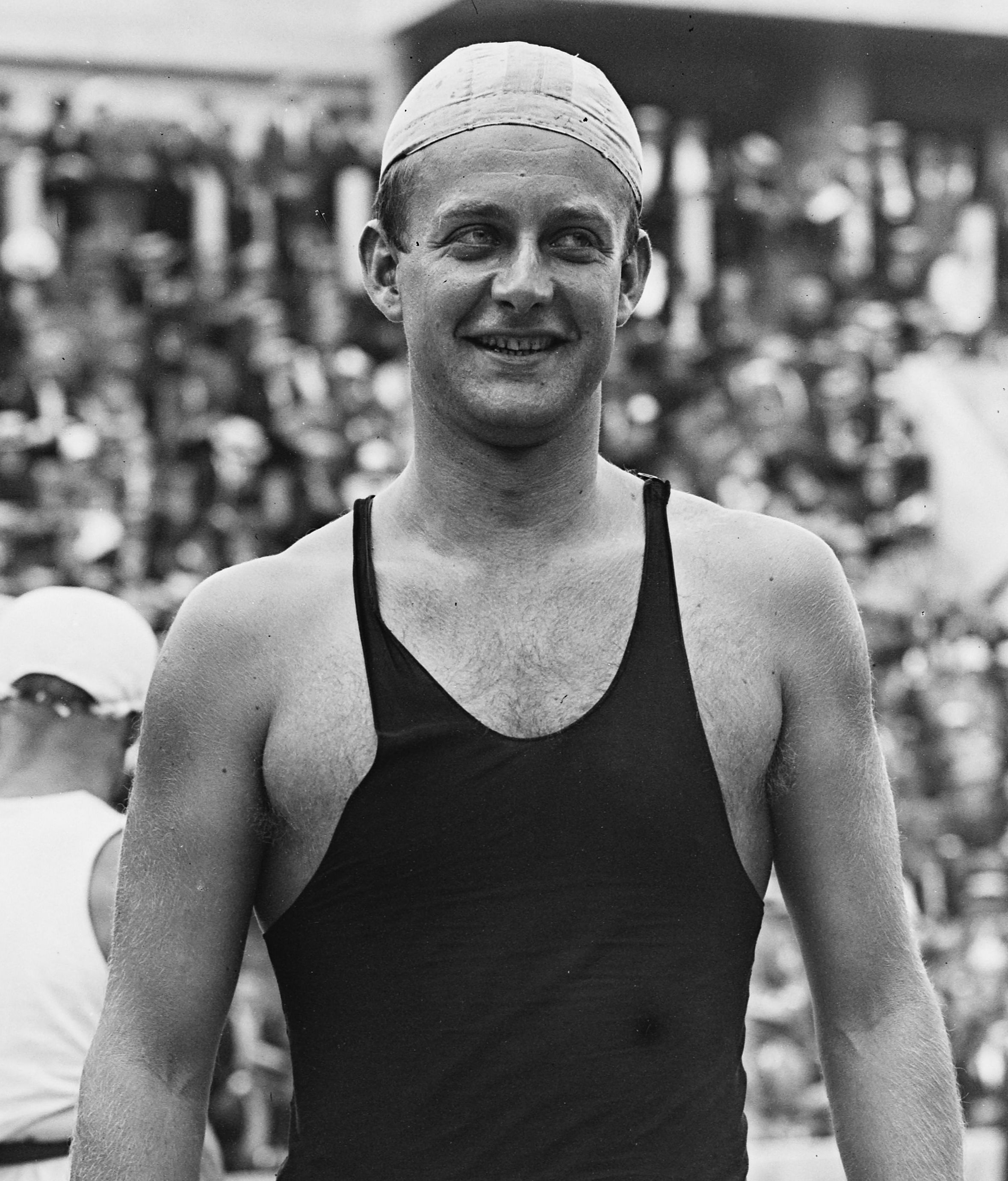
- Guy Middleton in 1925

Personal information
- Born: 4 August 1900
- Died: 30 October 1994 (aged 94)

Sport
- Sport: Swimming

Guy Middleton (4 August 1900 – 30 October 1994) was a French swimmer. He competed in the men's 4 × 200 metre freestyle relay event at the 1924 Summer Olympics.
