= Ivo Arčanin =

Yugoslav swimmer (1906–1995)

Personal information
- Born: 16 October 1906 Otočac, Austria-Hungary
- Died: 27 April 1995 (aged 88) Zagreb, Croatia

Sport
- Sport: Swimming

Ivan Arčanin (16 October 1906 – 27 April 1995) was a Yugoslav swimmer. He competed in the men's 4 × 200 metre freestyle relay event at the 1924 Summer Olympics.
