= Kazuo Onoda =

Japanese swimmer

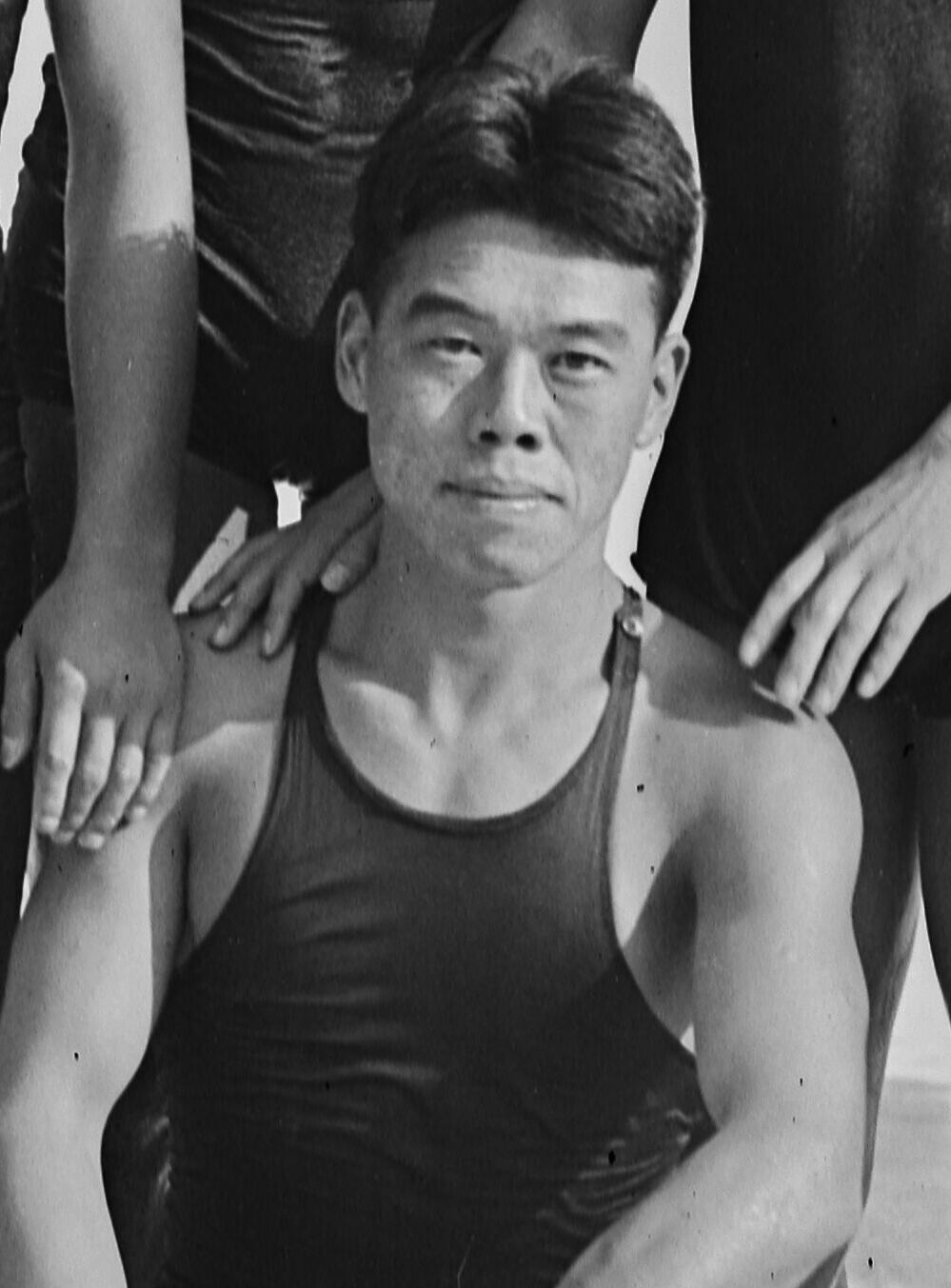
- Image of Kazuo Onoda

Personal information
- Born: November 28, 1900 Shizuoka Prefecture, Japan
- Died: February 21, 1983 (aged 82)

Sport
- Sport: Swimming

Kazuo Onoda (小野田 一雄, Onoda Kazuo; 28 November 1900 – 21 February 1983) was a Japanese freestyle swimmer who competed in the 1924 Summer Olympics. He was born in Shizuoka. In 1924 Onoda was eliminated in the first round of the 100 metre freestyle event as well as of the 1500 metre freestyle competition. He was also a member of the Japanese relay team which finished fourth in the 4 × 200 metre freestyle relay event.
