= John Thomson (swimmer) =

British swimmer

Personal information
- Born: February 18, 1903 Glasgow, Scotland
- Died: 1976 (aged 72–73) Balfron, Scotland

Sport
- Sport: Swimming

John Stark Thomson (18 February 1903 – 1976) was a British freestyle swimmer who competed in the 1924 Summer Olympics. In 1924 he was a member of the British relay team which finished fifth in the 4×200-metre freestyle relay.
