= Andrew "Boy" Charlton Pool =

Swimming pool

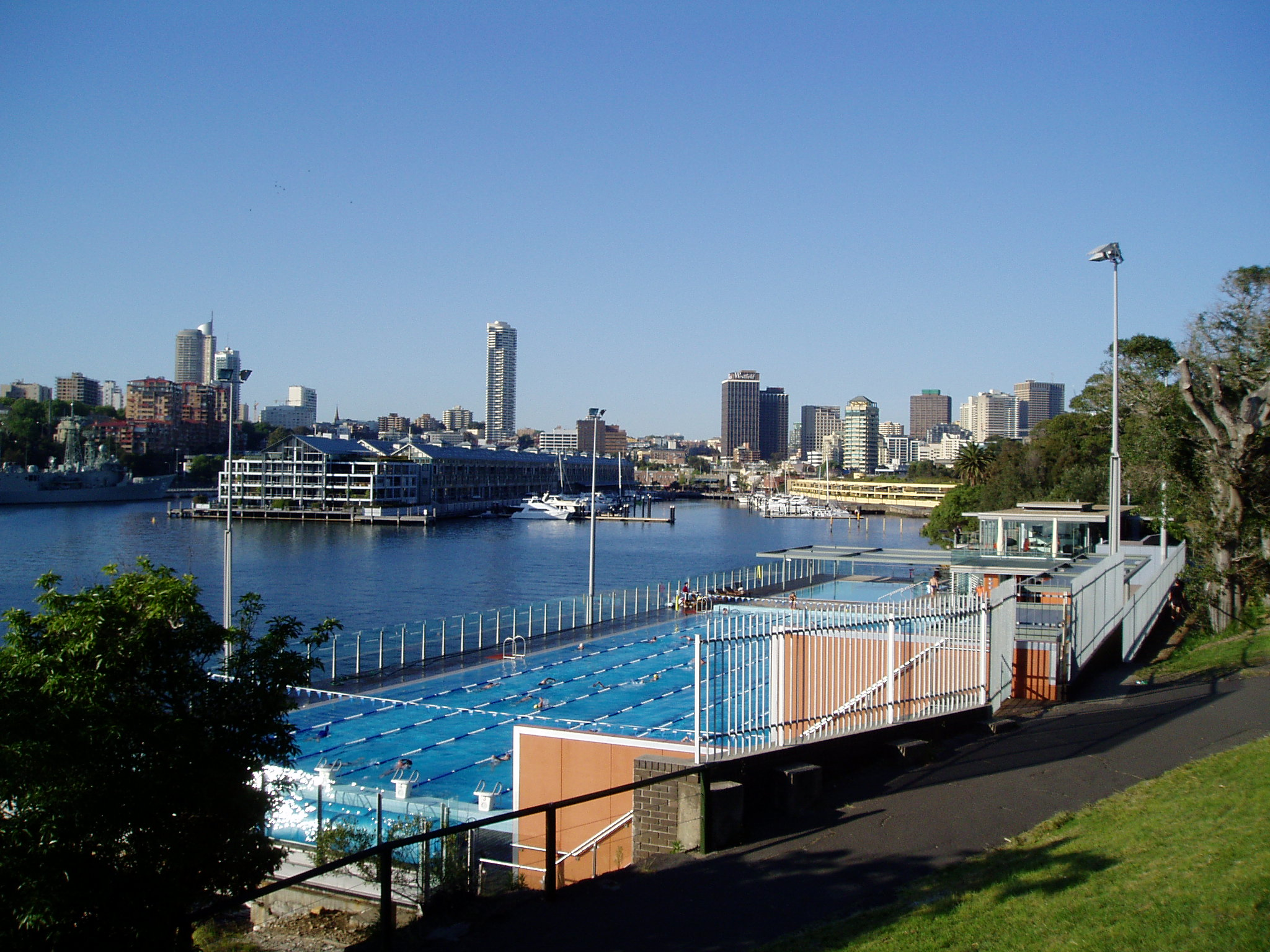
- Andrew "Boy" Charlton Pool
- Interactive map of Andrew "Boy" Charlton Pool
- Location: Mrs Macquarie's Road, The Domain, City of Sydney, New South Wales, Australia
- Coordinates: 33°51′48.02″S 151°13′19.14″E
- Owner: City of Sydney Council
- Operator: Belgravia Leisure
- Type: Open air; salt-water; heated
- Facilities: Yoga classes; Cafe; Massage facilities; Karate classes; Swimming lessons
- Dimensions: Main pool: Olympic standard (8 lanes only); Program pool: 20 metres (22 yd) with a maximum depth of 1.2 metres (3.9 ft); Length: 50 metres (55 yd); Width: 20 metres (22 yd)

Construction
- Opened: c. 1846

Website
- www.abcpool.org

Andrew "Boy" Charlton Pool is an eight-lane outdoor heated salt-water 50-metre (55 yd) swimming pool on the shore of Woolloomooloo Bay in The Domain in Sydney, Australia, near the Royal Botanic Gardens. The pool is typically closed for four months in the colder period of the year - May through August.

It was re-opened for the 2011–12 summer season, having undergoing a major refurbishment during 2011. In 1968, the pool, previously called the new Domain Baths, was renamed in honour of Andrew "Boy" Charlton, an Australian swimmer who won five Olympic medals during the 1920s.

This pool is not to be confused with the Manly Andrew Boy Charlton Aquatic Centre, known as MABCs.

== Early years ==
Since the first European settlement in Sydney there have been eleven different bathing establishments in Woolloomooloo Bay. In the early years, the small sandy beach where the Andrew "Boy" Charlton Pool now stands was reserved for the exclusive use of the military of NSW including the Marines, the New South Wales Corps and any British regiments stationed here.

In the 1820s the use of Woolloomooloo Bay by others was increasing. Two hulks, Ben Bolt and the Cornwallis were moored at the swimming place then known as the Fig Tree. Some dressing sheds were also built but the swimming area was not enclosed. The first swimming facility planned for the area was a floating public baths called Robinson's Hot and Cold Baths. Thomas Robinson was granted a lease for the area in December 1829 but construction of the baths took another ten years to complete. Beating Robinson to the jump was the wife of Governor Macquarie's coachman, Mrs Biggs. She opened the first ladies baths, which included a bathing machine, in 1833 on a small flat inlet near the north-western corner of Cowper Wharf. The baths went out of operation in the late 1840s. In November 1843, Robinson's baths reopened after a refurbishment which included deepening the ladies pool and the introduction of a shallow children's area. Warm showers and a towel were also available for all bathers.

== First swimming races ==
It was in the "Gentlemen's Baths" that Australia's the first official competitive swimming events took place. On 14 February 1846 two races were held, an open event over 402 metres (440 yd) (won by W. Redman in a time of 8 min 43 sec) and a 91-metre (100 yd) event for juveniles. Annual championships were held here for some years afterwards. In 1850 the Fig Tree baths and what was left of Mrs Biggs' women's baths were granted by the Government to Sydney Council with the intention that the Council build new baths on the site. However, with the dismissal of the council in 1853 the project stalled. In 1854 Mrs Macquarie's Road was opened to horse-drawn vehicles improving access to the baths. Towards the end of the 1850s Sydney Council, or "Corporation" as it was known, built new baths around the wharf at Fig Tree which projected into Woolloomooloo Bay.

This brought to three the sets of baths in the bay at this time. In addition to the Corporation Baths was a Ladies Baths (not Mrs Biggs' although near her former site) and a fully enclosed Gentlemen's Baths. Although the Corporation Baths were still there in 1888, more than 30 years later, they were largely unusable because of sewerage discharged into Woolloomooloo Bay. By 1890 there were four baths; the corporation had a ladies and a gentleman's baths and there were also independent ladies and gentleman's baths.

In 1901, since the sewer had been diverted to Bondi and no longer emptied into Sydney Harbour at Woolloomooloo, the State Government extended the lease for the baths with Sydney Council. Funding was also provided to remove the haphazard collection of bathing buildings which had accumulated over the years and construct a new baths. These were officially opened in October 1908 and consisted of a fenced swimming area and concrete platform over the old stone one attached to the shore. Another fence provided privacy from the path and there was a timber and corrugated iron change shed.

== Andrew "Boy" Charlton ==
Apart from Australia's first swimming races, the most memorable event to take place in the Domain Baths was in January 1924 when Andrew "Boy" Charlton swam against Arne Borg of Sweden. A crowd of 6,000 came to see him beat Borg over 402 metres (440 yd), equal Borg's world record and set a new Australian record.

Charlton was already very popular in New South Wales when he took on Borg. At the age of 14 he beat Hawaiian swimmer Bill Harris over 805 metres (880 yd) setting a new world record in the process. At 15 years of age he beat Olympic swimmer Frank Beaurepaire and won the NSW 800 metres (870 yd) freestyle title in world record time talking 19 seconds off the old mark. It was his win over Borg, however, that launched him to national stardom. He beat Borg again over 201 metres (220 yd) and 805 metres (880 yd) at the NSW Championships.

Charlton went on to win the gold medal in the 1,500 metres (1,600 yd) freestyle event at the Paris Olympics later that year and silver in the 400 metres (440 yd) and 1,500 metres (1,600 yd) events at the 1932 Los Angeles Olympics.

His 1924 world record in the Domain baths was the first set there, an achievement which was recognised in January 1968 when, after yet another refurbishment, the pool was reopened and named after him.

== See also ==
- Ian Thorpe Aquatic and Fitness Centre
- Cook and Phillip Park Aquatic and Fitness Centre
