= Adam Smith (swimmer) =

American swimmer (1903–1985)

Personal information
- Full name: Adam Wyman Smith
- National team: United States
- Born: December 28, 1903 Bradford, Pennsylvania, U.S.
- Died: April 8, 1985 (aged 81) Wilmington, North Carolina, U.S.
- Height: 5 ft 5 in (1.65 m)

Sport
- Sport: Swimming
- Strokes: Freestyle
- Club: Erie YMCA

Adam Wyman Smith (December 28, 1903 – April 8, 1985) was an American competition swimmer who represented the United States at the 1924 Summer Olympics in Paris. Smith competed in the men's 1,500-meter freestyle, advanced to the semifinals, and posted a time of 22:39.8.
