= Tomás Jones =

Argentine swimmer

Personal information
- Born: 1903

Sport
- Sport: Swimming

Tomás Jones (born 1903, date of death unknown) was an Argentine swimmer. He competed in the men's 4 × 200 metre freestyle relay event at the 1924 Summer Olympics.
