= Julio Peredejordi =

Spanish swimmer

Personal information
- Born: 22 February 1906
- Died: October 1973 (aged 67)

Sport
- Sport: Swimming

Julio Peredejordi (22 February 1906 – October 1973) was a Spanish swimmer. He competed in the men's 4 × 200 metre freestyle relay event at the 1924 Summer Olympics.
