= Đura Sentđerđi =

Yugoslav swimmer

Personal information
- Born: 19 January 1900 Sombor, Austria-Hungary
- Died: 1980 (aged 79–80) Argentina

Sport
- Sport: Swimming

Đura Sentđerđi (Serbian Cyrillic: Ђура Сентђерђи; 19 January 1900 – 1980) was a Yugoslav swimmer. He competed in the men's 400 metre freestyle event at the 1924 Summer Olympics.
