= Katsuo Takaishi =

Japanese swimmer (1906–1966)

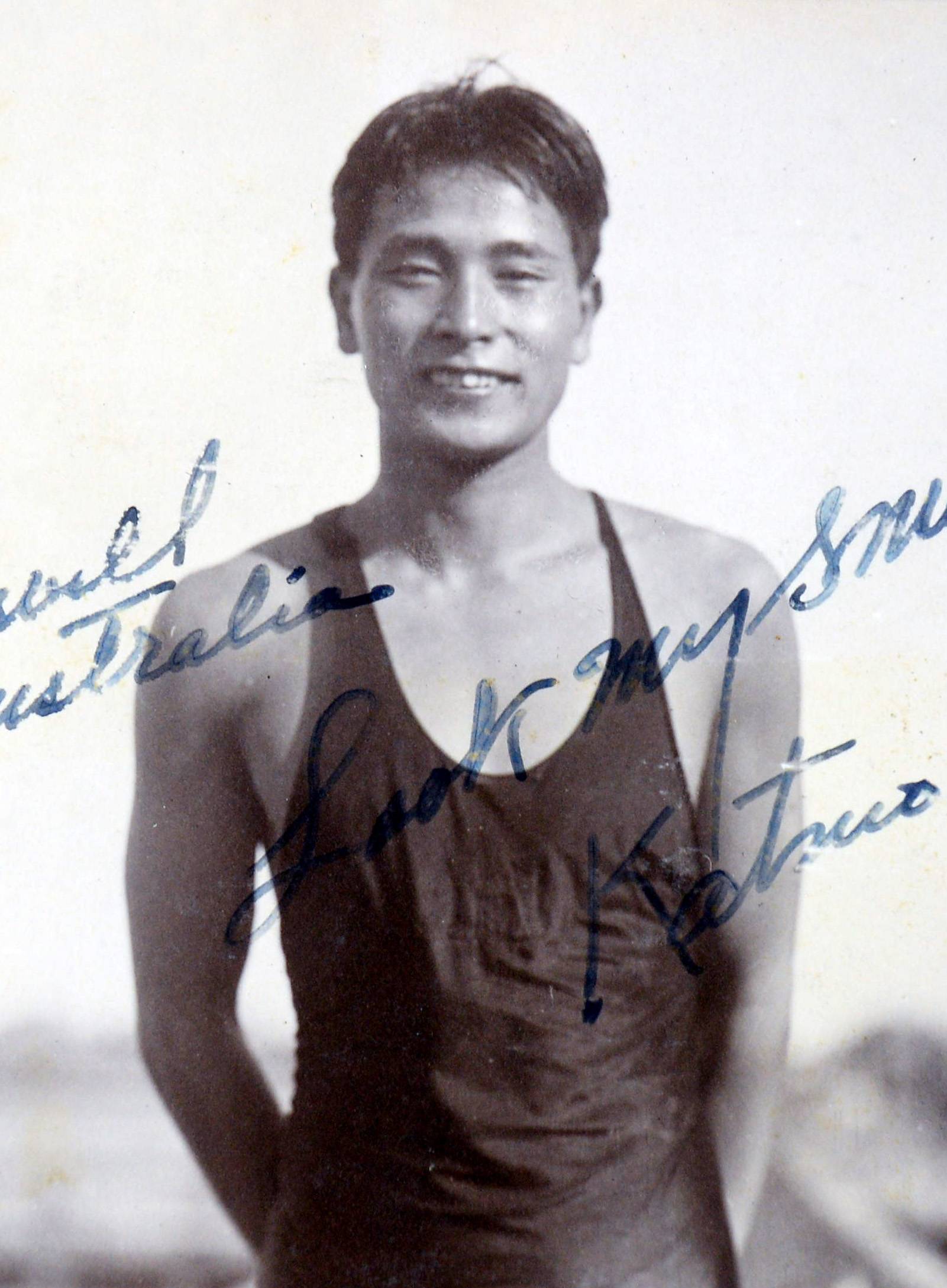
- Katsuo Takaishi in 1926

Personal information
- Full name: 高石 勝男
- Nationality: Japanese
- Born: October 14, 1906 Osaka Prefecture, Japan
- Died: April 13, 1966 (aged 59) Osaka Prefecture, Japan

Sport
- Sport: Swimming
- Strokes: Freestyle
Medal record
Representing Japan
Olympic Games
Silver medal – second place	1928 Amsterdam	4×200 m freestyle
Bronze medal – third place	1928 Amsterdam	100 m freestyle

Katsuo Takaishi (高石 勝男, Takaishi Katsuo; October 14, 1906 – April 13, 1966) was a Japanese swimmer, swimming coach and sports administrator.

Takaishi was born in Osaka and graduated from Waseda University. During the 1923 Far Eastern Games held in Osaka, he won all three freestyle swimming events, which secured him a place on the Japanese Olympic team. At the 1924 Olympics, Takaishi placed fourth in the 4 × 200 meter freestyle relay and fifth in the 100 m freestyle and in the 1500 m freestyle event. Although he did not win a medal, it was the first time that a swimmer from Asia finished next to the podium.

From 1924 to 1928, Takaishi won every international competition he attended, except when racing against Johnny Weissmuller. At the 1928 Olympics, as the leader of the Japanese swimming team, Takaishi won a silver medal in the 4 × 200 m freestyle relay and a bronze medal in the 100 m freestyle, becoming the first Asian to win an Olympic medal in swimming. He finished fourth in a 400 m semifinal and thus did not advance to the final.

At the 1932 Olympics in Los Angeles Takaishi served as team captain and coach for the Japanese team, which won all men's events save one. After his return to Japan, he wrote a book, Swimming in Japan, which was published in 1935.

He served as general director of the Japanese national swimming team for the 1964 Summer Olympics in Tokyo, and was chairman of the Amateur Swimming Federation of Japan. Takaishi died of lung cancer at the age of 59. He was posthumously honored with induction into the International Swimming Hall of Fame in 1991.

== See also ==
- List of members of the International Swimming Hall of Fame
