= Jorge Moreau =

Argentine swimmer (1908–1959)

Personal information
- Born: 1 February 1908 Buenos Aires, Argentina
- Died: 8 December 1959 (aged 51)

Sport
- Sport: Swimming

Jorge Moreau (1 February 1908 – 8 December 1959) was an Argentine swimmer. He competed in the men's 4 × 200 metre freestyle relay event at the 1924 Summer Olympics and the water polo tournament at the 1928 Summer Olympics.
