= John Taylor (swimmer) =

British swimmer

Personal information
- Born: 7 April 1904 Ormskirk, Great Britain
- Died: 20 October 1980 (aged 76)

Sport
- Sport: Swimming

John Philip Taylor (7 April 1904 – 20 October 1980) was a British freestyle swimmer who competed in the 1924 Summer Olympics. He was born in Ormskirk, Lancashire. In 1924 he was eliminated in the semi-finals of the 1500 metre freestyle event.
