= Kazuo Noda =

Japanese swimmer

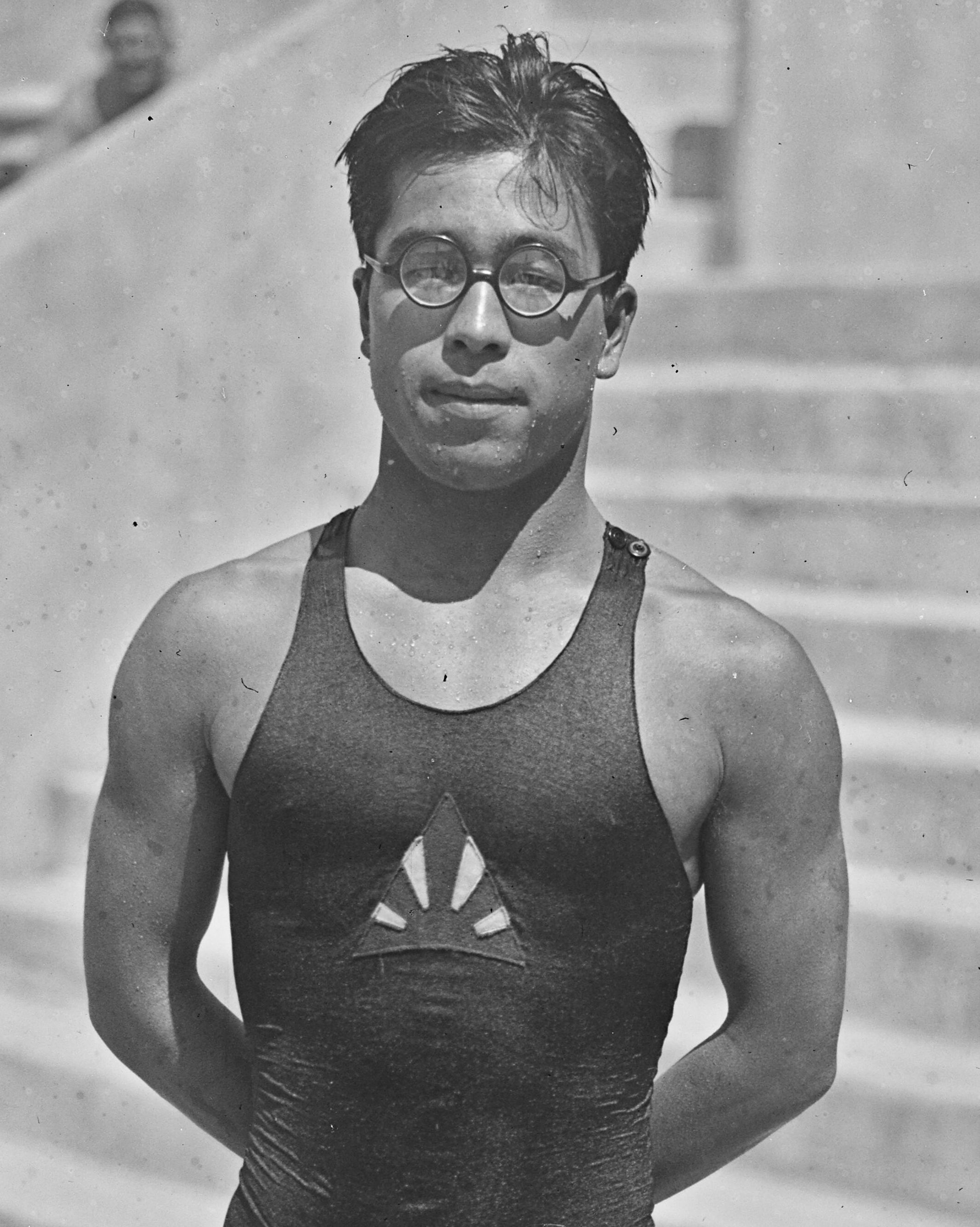
- Kazuo Noda in 1924

Personal information
- Born: June 30, 1908 Hamamatsu, Shizuoka Prefecture, Japan
- Died: March 31, 1995 (aged 86)

Sport
- Sport: Swimming

Kazuo Noda (野田 一雄, Noda Kazuo; 30 June 1908 – 31 March 1995) was a Japanese freestyle swimmer who competed in the 1924 Summer Olympics and in the 1928 Summer Olympics. He was born in Shizuoka.

In 1924 he was eliminated in the first round of the 400 metre freestyle event as well as of the 1500 metre freestyle competition. He was also a member of the Japanese relay team which finished fourth in the 4 × 200 metre freestyle relay event. Four years later he helped the Japanese relay team to qualify for the final of the 4 × 200 metre freestyle relay competition when he swam in the semi-final. His compatriots won the silver medal, but Noda did not swim in the final and was not awarded with a medal.
