= Atilije Venturini =

Yugoslav swimmer

Personal information
- Born: 12 August 1908 Bakar, Kingdom of Croatia-Slavonia, Austria-Hungary
- Died: 15 June 1944 (aged 35) Sušak, Operational Zone of the Adratic Littoral

Sport
- Sport: Swimming

Atilije Venturini (12 August 1908 – 15 June 1944) was a Yugoslav swimmer. He competed in two events at the 1924 Summer Olympics.
