= Ante Roje =

Croatian swimmer

Personal information
- Born: 1 October 1905 Split, Austria-Hungary
- Died: 15 December 1980 (aged 75)

Sport
- Sport: Swimming

Ante Roje (1 October 1905 – 15 December 1980) was a Croatian swimmer. He competed in two events at the 1924 Summer Olympics and the water polo at the 1936 Summer Olympics.
