= Renato Bacigalupo =

Italian swimmer

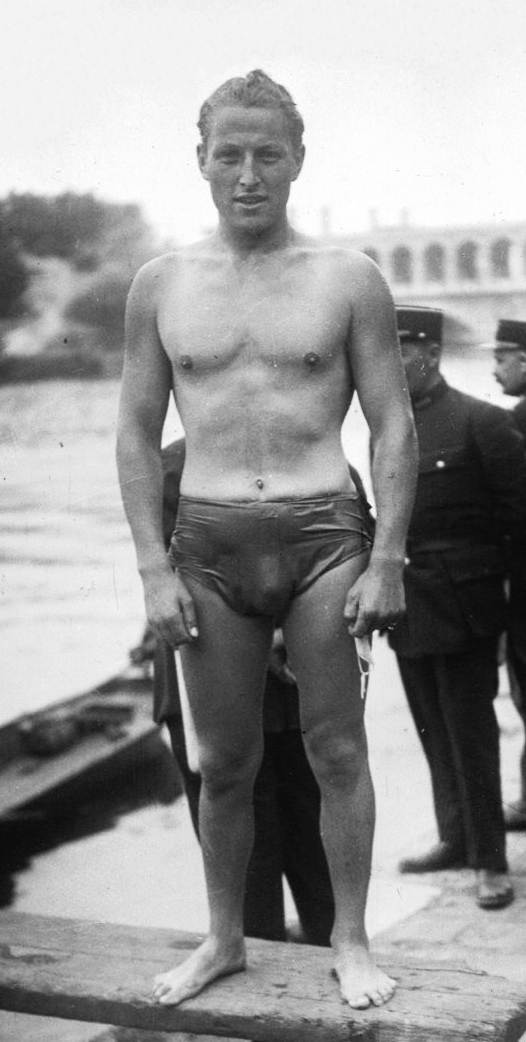
- Bacigalupo in 1926

Personal information
- Born: 8 July 1908 Rapallo, Italy
- Died: 6 October 1979 (aged 71) Rapallo, Italy

Sport
- Sport: Swimming
- Club: Rapallo Ruentes

Luigi Renato Bacigalupo (8 July 1908 – 6 October 1979) was an Italian freestyle swimmer. He competed at the 1924 Summer Olympics in the 1500 m and 4 × 200 m relay, but failed to reach the finals. His elder brother was also named Luigi and was also a competitive freestyle swimmer.
