= Blikstorp =

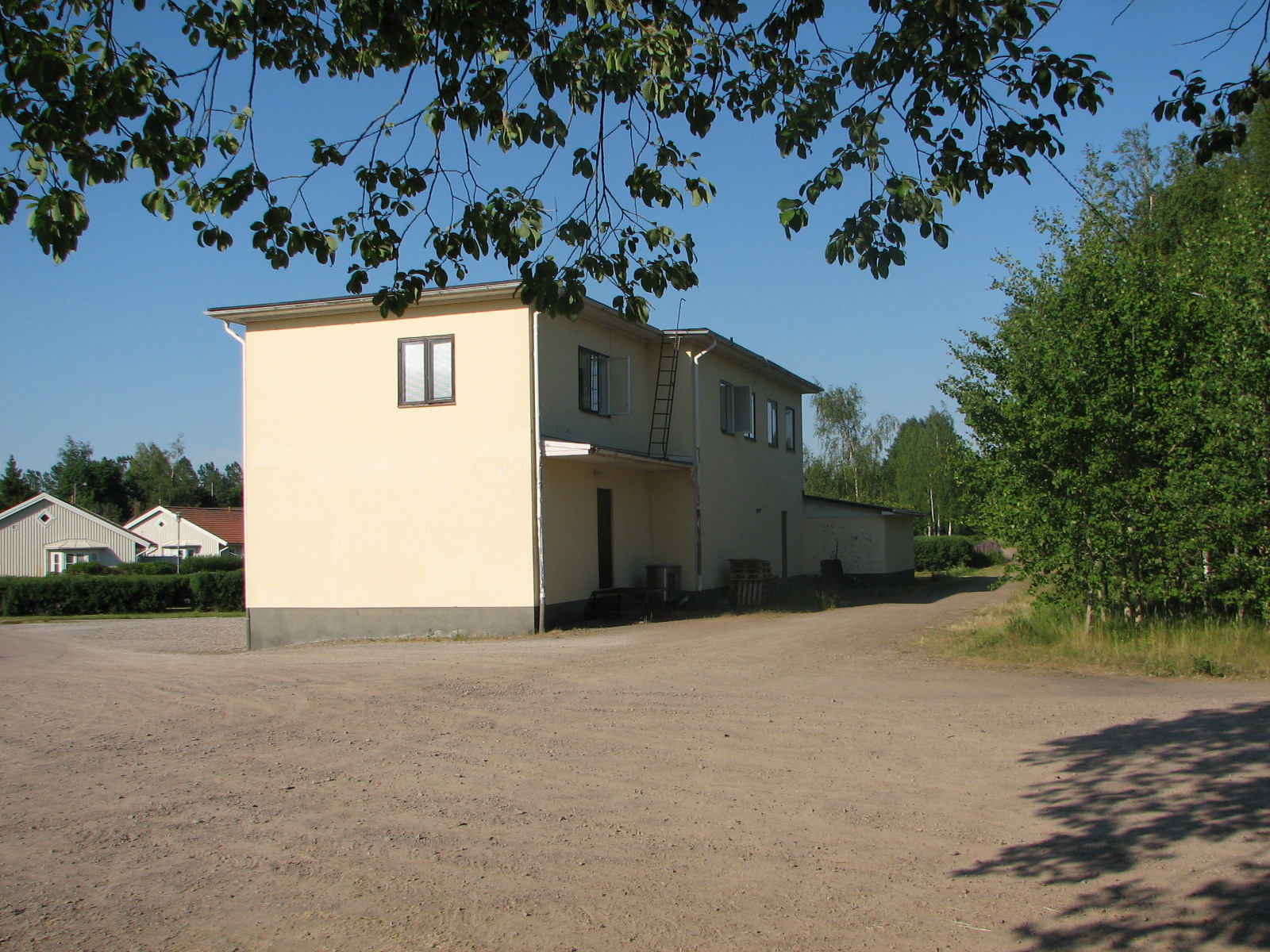
- Blikstorp old railway station in June 2008

- Location within Västra Götaland Location within Sweden
- Coordinates: 58°16′N 14°03′E
- Country: Sweden
- Province: Västergötland
- County: Västra Götaland County
- Municipality: Hjo Municipality

Area
  - Total: 0.45 km^{2} (0.17 sq mi)

Population (31 December 2010)
  - Total: 222
  - Density: 492/km^{2} (1,270/sq mi)
- Time zone: UTC+1 (CET)
  - Summer (DST): UTC+2 (CEST)

Blikstorp is a locality situated in Hjo Municipality, Västra Götaland County, Sweden. It had 222 inhabitants in 2010.
