= Gösta Persson =

Swedish swimmer

Personal information
- Full name: Otto Gösta Adolf Persson
- Born: 8 January 1904 Stockholm
- Died: 23 February 1991 (aged 87) Malmö

Sport
- Sport: Swimming
- Strokes: Freestyle
Medal record
Representing Sweden
Men's Swimming
| Bronze medal – third place | 1924 Paris | 4 x 200 m freestyle relay |

Otto Gösta Adolf Persson (8 January 1904 – 23 February 1991) was a Swedish freestyle swimmer and water polo player who competed in the 1924 Summer Olympics and in the 1936 Summer Olympics.

Gösta Persson was born in Stockholm on 8 January 1904. He represented Stockholms KK and SK Neptun. In 1924 he won the bronze medal as member of the Swedish 4 x 200 metres freestyle relay team. He was also part of the Swedish team which finished fourth in the Olympic water polo tournament. He played all six matches. Twelve years later he played four matches in the 1936 Olympic water polo tournament when the Swedish team finished in seventh place.

Persson died in Malmö on 23 February 1991.
