= Georg Werner =

Swedish swimmer

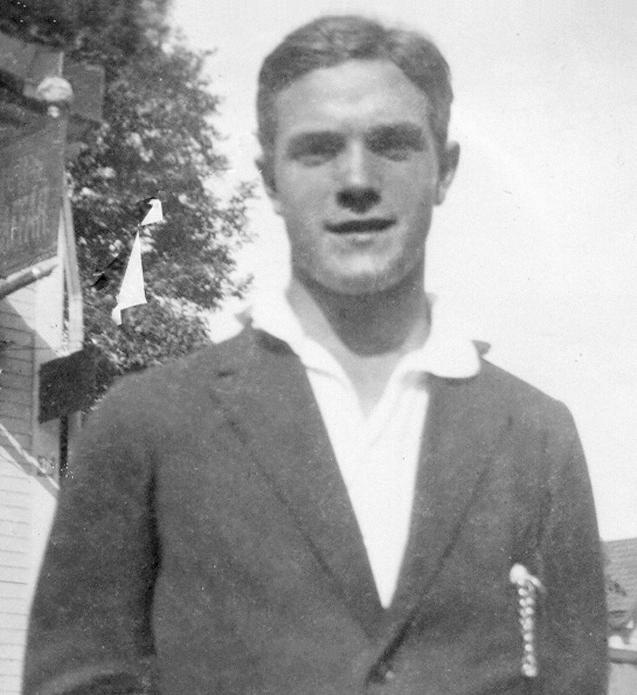

Personal information
- Born: 8 April 1904 Stockholm, Sweden-Norway
- Died: 26 August 2002 (aged 98) Stockholm, Sweden

Sport
- Sport: Swimming
- Strokes: Freestyle
- Club: SoIK Hellas
Medal record
Representing Sweden
Olympic Games
Bronze medal – third place	1924 Paris	4×200 m freestyle
European Championships (LC)
Bronze medal – third place	1926 Budapest	100 m freestyle
Bronze medal – third place	1926 Budapest	4×200 m freestyle

Karl Oskar Georg Werner (8 April 1904 – 26 August 2002) was a Swedish freestyle swimmer who won bronze medals in the 4 × 200 m relay at the 1924 Olympics and 1926 European Championships.
