= Ernest Henry (swimmer) =

Australian swimmer

Personal information
- Full name: George Ernest Morrison Henry
- National team: Australia
- Born: 13 May 1904 Grafton, New South Wales
- Died: 3 June 1998 (aged 94) Port Macquarie, New South Wales
- Height: 1.83 m (6 ft 0 in)

Sport
- Sport: Swimming
- Strokes: Freestyle
- Club: Manly Swimming Club
Medal record
Men's swimming
Representing Australia
Olympic Games
Silver medal – second place	1924 Paris	4×200 m freestyle relay

George Ernest Morrison Henry (13 May 1904 – 3 June 1998) was an Australian freestyle swimmer of the 1920s, who won a silver medal in the 4×200-metre freestyle relay at the 1924 Summer Olympics. He also competed in the 100-metre freestyle in the same event. He spent the majority of his career in the shadow of his Manly Swimming Club teammate Boy Charlton.

Henry was 18 years of age when he was selected for the 1924 Summer Olympics in Paris. Competing in the 100-metre freestyle, he reached the semifinals, where he was eliminated. Henry combined with Australian teammates Frank Beaurepaire, Moss Christie and Charlton to claim the silver medal in the 4×200-metre freestyle relay. The American relay team, led by Johnny Weissmuller, bested the Australians by almost 7 seconds to set a new world record.

Henry attended Sydney Boys High School, graduating in 1923. His older brothers Alfred and Goya Henry were also talented swimmers.

== See also ==
- List of Olympic medalists in swimming (men)

== Bibliography ==
- Andrews, Malcolm (2000). Australia at the Olympic Games. Sydney, New South Wales: ABC Books. pp. 203–204. ISBN 0-7333-0884-8.
