= Harry Glancy =

American swimmer (1904–2002)

Personal information
- Full name: Harrison Smith Glancy
- National team: United States
- Born: September 17, 1904 Bens Run, West Virginia, U.S.
- Died: September 22, 2002 (aged 98) New Orleans, Louisiana, U.S.
- Spouse: Irma Mae Lucas m. 1926

Sport
- Sport: Swimming
- Strokes: Freestyle
- Club: Penn Athletic Club; Cincinnati YMCA
Medal record
Men's swimming
Representing the United States
Olympic Games
Gold medal – first place	1924 Paris	4x200 m freestyle

Harrison Smith Glancy (September 17, 1904 – September 22, 2002) was an American competition swimmer for Mercersburg Academy who won a gold medal in the 4x200 freestyle relay representing the United States at the 1924 Summer Olympics in Paris, France. Glancy also represented the U.S. team in the 1928 Summer Olympics in Amsterdam, Netherlands.

== Mercersburg Academy ==
Though born in Bens Run, Virginia on September 17, 1904, Glancy grew up in Kentucky. When he was 14, his family moved to Pittsburgh in 1919, and he got a job in a local health club where he began swimming. He attended and swam for Pittsburgh's prestigious Mercersburg Academy during his peak swimming years. On January 26, 1924, Glancy helped lead Mercersburg to the National Interscholastic Swimming Championship in Philadelphia. The team had won the title in previous years. On August 11, 1923, he won the 220-yard Senior National AAU freestyle at Ideal Park in Johnstown, Pennsylvania, leading the field throughout the race, but touching only a few inches ahead of Harold Kruger in an exciting finish. In August 1925, he placed second to Johnny Weissmuller at Seattle's Senior Men's outdoor swimming championships in the 440-yard freestyle.

== 1924 Paris Olympic gold ==
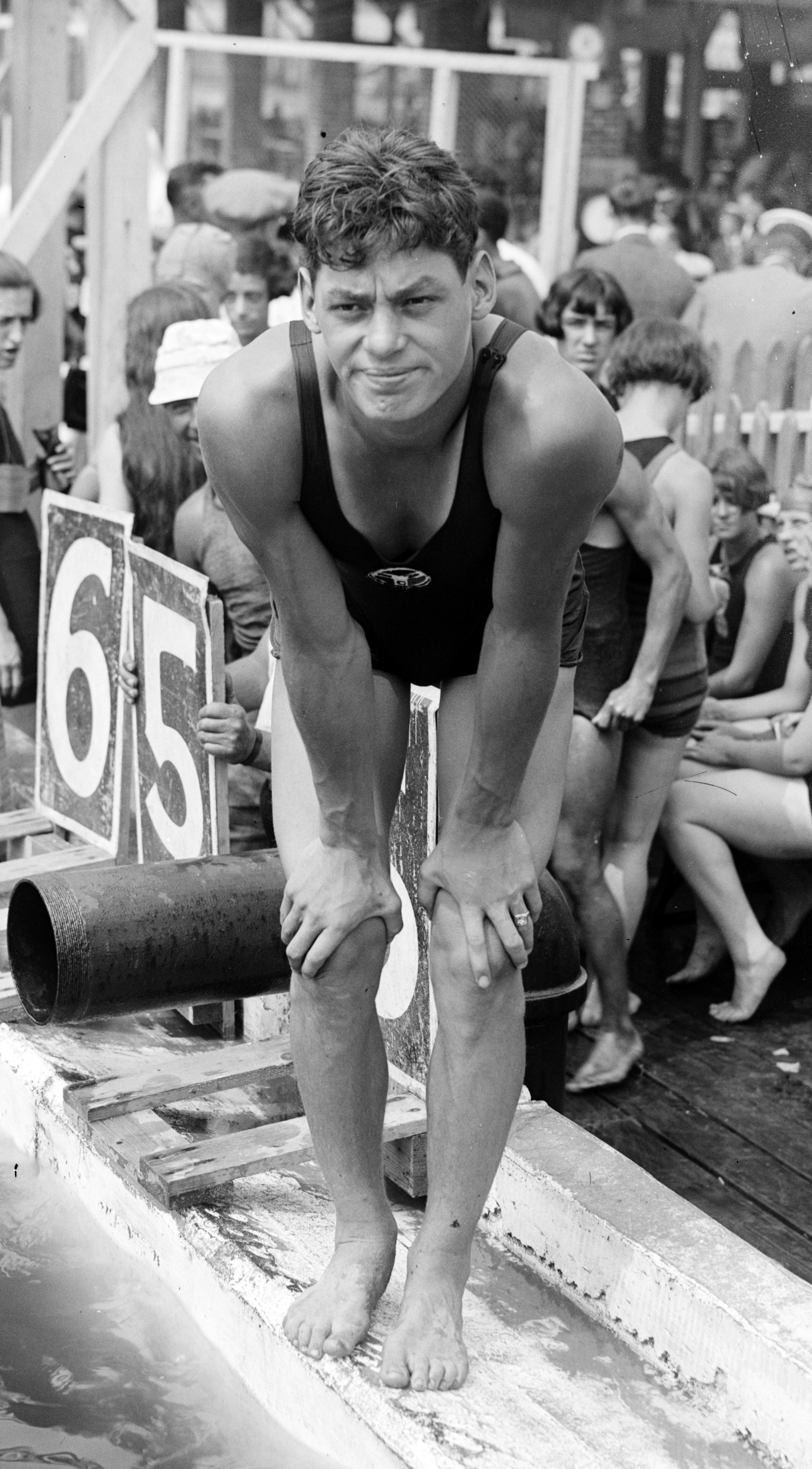
Olympic teammate Johnny Weissmuller in 1924

In 1924, Glancy won a gold medal as a member of the winning U.S. team in the men's 4×200-meter freestyle relay, together with teammates Ralph Breyer, Wally O'Connor and Johnny Weissmuller. Glancy and his American teammates set new world records in both the semifinals (9:59.4) and final (9:53.4).

After the Paris Olympics, Glancy transferred to the Cincinnati YMCA, and began to complete exclusively for the club. He was engaged to Cincinnati area swimmer Irma May Lucas of Covington, Kentucky, around August, 1926. Irma Mae Glancy became the first Western female athlete to compete in Japan, when she swam at the 1927 Pan Pacific Games.

In international competition after the Olympics, Glancy captained the U.S. team at the 1927 Pan Pacific Games that captured a gold medal.

Glancy also qualified and participated in the 1928 Olympics. The American team again took the gold medal in the 4x200 freestyle relay, but without Harry's participation.

In service to the swimming community, Glancy was on the Olympic Swimming Committee, helped organize the Havalanta Games with Carlos de Cuba, and played water polo at the Penn Aquatic Club.

=== Later life ===
After his years as a swimming competitor, he served as a swim judge at the 1952 Games in Helsinki, Finland, the 1956 Games in Melbourne, Australia, and the 1960 Games in Rome.

Glancy moved to Sarasota after retiring from the Gulf Oil Company in 1969. He was the first person to carry the Olympic torch in Sarasota in 1996 before the Atlanta Games.

He died at his home in New Orleans of heart failure on September 22, 2002, at the age of 98. Survived by two sons and five grandchildren, he was predeceased by his wife Irma in 1997. After a memorial service, he was buried at St. Thomas More Church Garden in Sarasota, Florida.

=== Honors ===
He was inducted into the International Swimming Hall of Fame as an "Honor Pioneer Swimmer" in 1990.

== See also ==
- List of members of the International Swimming Hall of Fame
- List of Olympic medalists in swimming (men)
- World record progression 4 × 200 metres freestyle relay
