= Arne Borg =

Swedish swimmer (1901–1987)

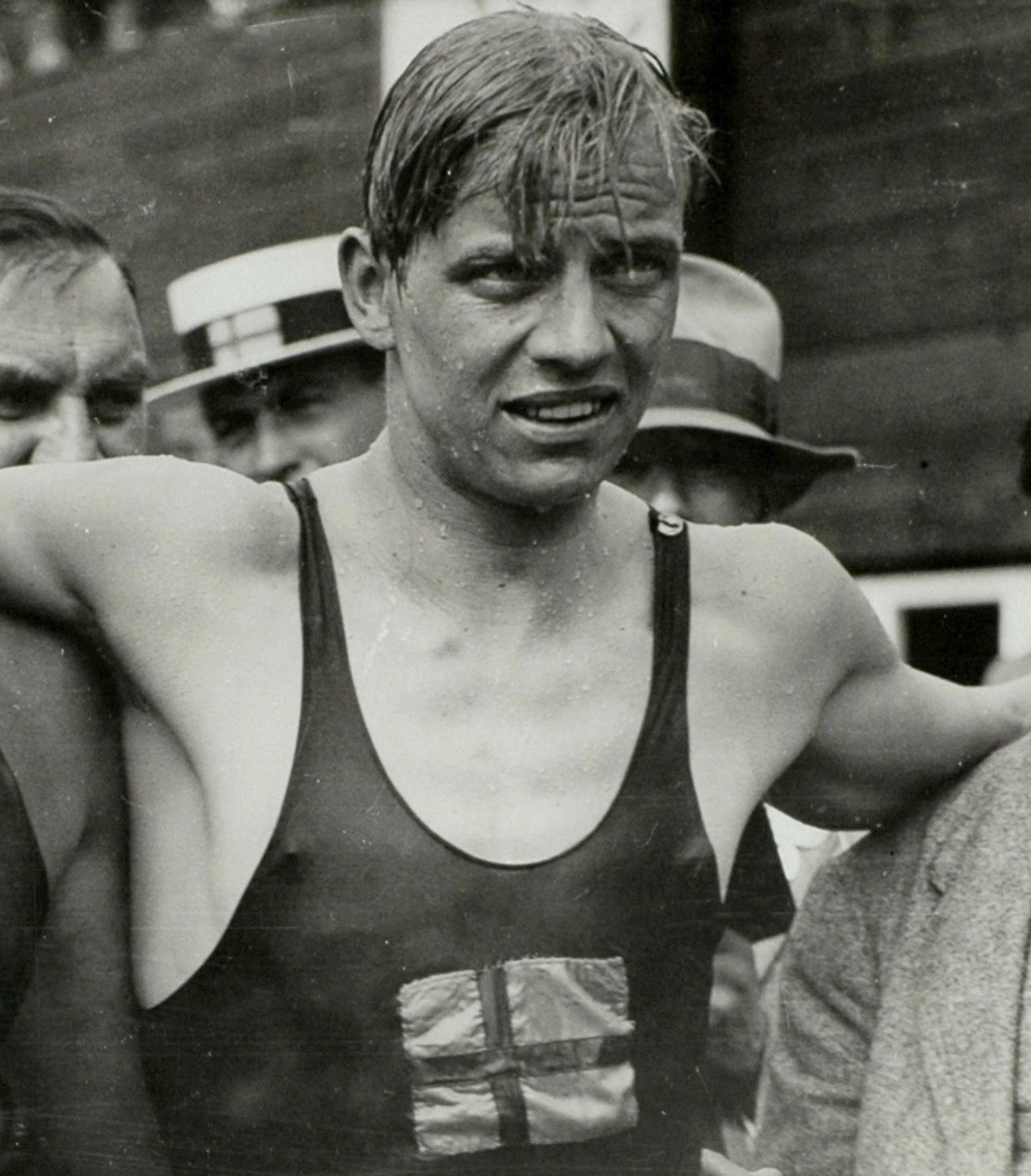
- Arne Borg at the 1928 Summer Olympics

Personal information
- Full name: Claes Arne Borg
- National team: Sweden
- Born: 18 August 1901 Stockholm, Sweden
- Died: 7 November 1987 (aged 86) Vallentuna, Sweden

Sport
- Sport: Swimming
- Strokes: Freestyle
- Club: Stockholms KK
Medal record
Representing Sweden
Olympic Games
Silver medal – second place	1924 Paris	400 m freestyle
Silver medal – second place	1924 Paris	1500 m freestyle
Bronze medal – third place	1924 Paris	4×200 m freestyle
Gold medal – first place	1928 Amsterdam	1500 m freestyle
Bronze medal – third place	1928 Amsterdam	400 m freestyle
European Championships
Gold medal – first place	1926 Budapest	400 m freestyle
Gold medal – first place	1926 Budapest	1500 m freestyle
Silver medal – second place	1926 Budapest	100 m freestyle
Bronze medal – third place	1926 Budapest	4×200 m freestyle
Gold medal – first place	1927 Bologna	100 m freestyle
Gold medal – first place	1927 Bologna	400 m freestyle
Gold medal – first place	1927 Bologna	1500 m freestyle
Silver medal – second place	1927 Bologna	4×200 m freestyle
Water polo
European Championships
Silver medal – second place	1926 Budapest	Team

Claes Arne Borg (18 August 1901 – 7 November 1987) was a Swedish swimmer. He is best known for breaking 32 world records and winning five Olympic medals in the 1920s. In 1926 Borg won the Svenska Dagbladet Gold Medal, shared with Edvin Wide. Next year, at the 1927 European Championships, he set a new world record in the 1500 m at 19:07.2, which stood for nearly 11 years. Besides swimming, Borg also won a European silver medal in water polo in 1926. His twin brother Åke was also an Olympic medalist in swimming.

At the end of his swimming career, Borg turned professional and toured with aquatic shows. After that, he worked as a swimming coach and ran his tobacco shop in Stockholm. He was very popular among Swedish swimming fans. After avoiding his conscription and being briefly imprisoned, fans brought him food and gifts, and he was noted to have gained weight in prison.

Borg died in 1987 in Vallentuna. His daughter Inga Borg (1925–2017) was a children's book writer.

== See also ==
- List of members of the International Swimming Hall of Fame
- World record progression 400 metres freestyle
- World record progression 800 metres freestyle
- World record progression 1500 metres freestyle

Records
Preceded by George Hodgson	Men's 1500 metres freestyle world record holder (long course); 8 July 1923 – 15 July 1924	Succeeded by Boy Charlton
Preceded by Boy Charlton	Men's 1500 metres freestyle world record holder (long course); 18 August 1926 – 10 August 1938	Succeeded by Tomikatsu Amano
Awards
Preceded by Sten Pettersson	Svenska Dagbladet Gold Medal with Edvin Wide; 1926	Succeeded by Sven Salén
