= Pedro Méndez =

Spanish swimmer

Personal information
- Born: 27 September 1904 Madrid, Spain
- Died: 19 February 1999 (aged 94) Madrid, Spain

Sport
- Sport: Swimming

Pedro Méndez (27 September 1904 – 19 February 1999) was a Spanish freestyle swimmer. He competed in three events at the 1924 Summer Olympics.
