= Ralph Breyer =

American swimmer (1904–1991)

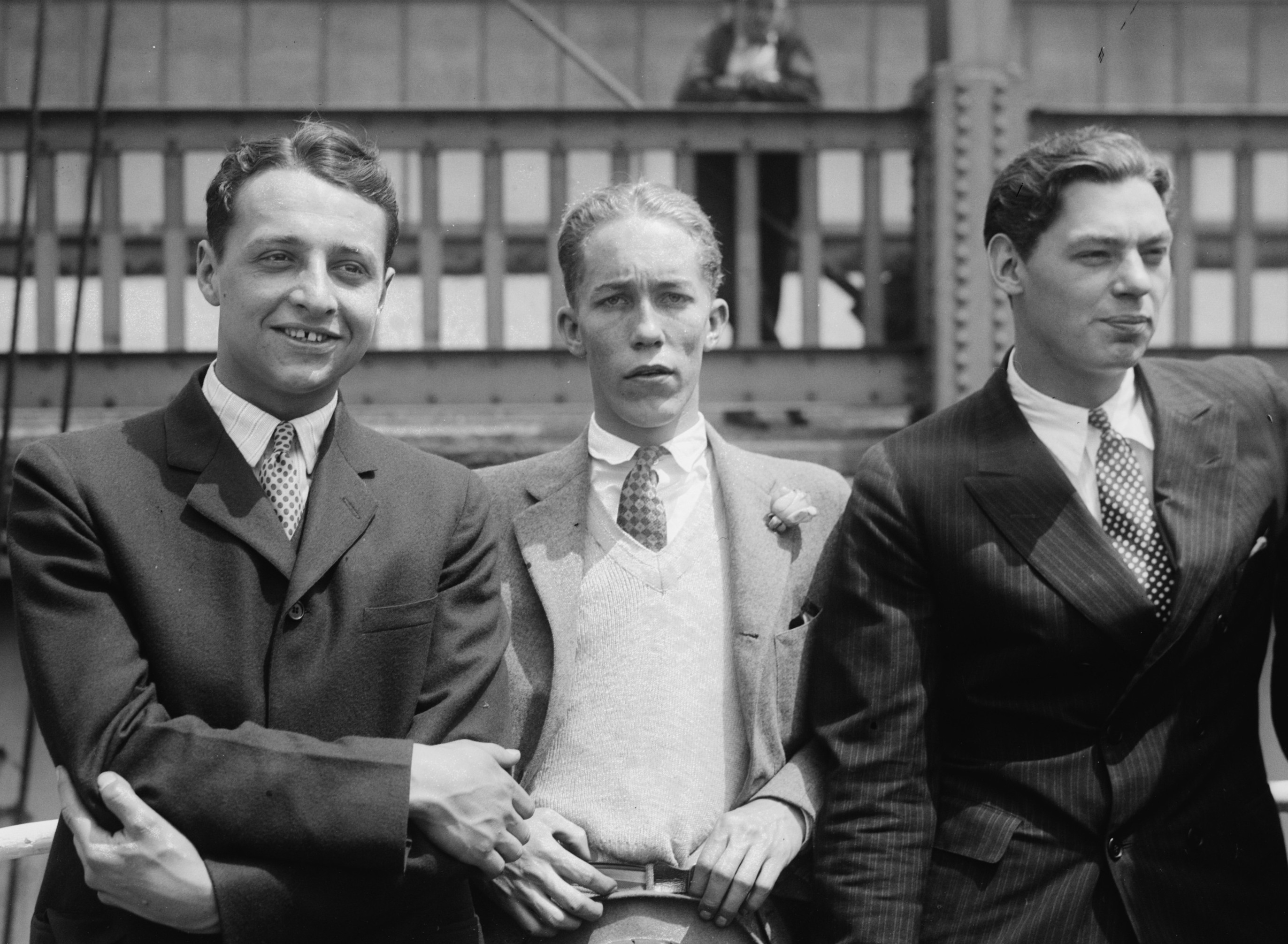
- Breyer, Robert Skelton, Johnny Weissmuller in 1925

Personal information
- Full name: Ralph Theodore Breyer
- National team: United States
- Born: February 23, 1904 Chicago, Illinois, U.S.
- Died: May 8, 1991 (aged 87) Thousand Oaks, California, U.S.
- Height: 5 ft 11 in (1.80 m)

Sport
- Sport: Swimming
- Strokes: Freestyle
- College team: Northwestern University
Medal record
Men's swimming
Representing the United States
Olympic Games
Gold medal – first place	1924 Paris	4x200 m freestyle relay

Ralph Theodore Breyer (February 23, 1904 – May 8, 1991) was an American competition swimmer and Olympic champion.

== Early life ==
Ralph Breyer was born in Chicago, on February 23, 1904. After graduating from Lane Technical High School, he received a swimming scholarship from Northwestern University in 1921.

== Swimming career ==
=== 1924 Paris Olympics ===
He represented the United States at the 1924 Summer Olympics in Paris. He won a gold medal as a member of the first-place world record breaking U.S. team in the men's 4×200-meter freestyle relay event. He also competed in the qualifying heats of the men's 400-meter freestyle, and recorded a time of 5:22.4 setting a new Olympic record. The relay team consisted of members Harry Glancy, Wally O'Connor, Johnny Weissmuller, Dick Howell and Breyer, while other members of the US team included brothers Sam and Duke Kahanamoku.

At Northwestern University, Breyer led his team to two NCAA and three Big Ten championships. Individually, he earned four NCAA championships. His team remained undefeated in dual meets. In 1925 he was the recipient of the Big Ten medal of honor. Breyer married Marguerite Gullicksen of Chicago, Illinois and had two children, William Charles Breyer and Robert Theodore Breyer.

== Later life ==
He was made a charter member of the Northwestern University Athletic Hall of Fame in 1984. In March 1985, he was among the first athletes inducted into the NU Wildcats Hall of Fame.

== See also ==
- List of Northwestern University alumni
- List of Olympic medalists in swimming (men)
- World record progression 4 × 200 metres freestyle relay
