= Åke Borg =

Swedish swimmer (1901–1973)

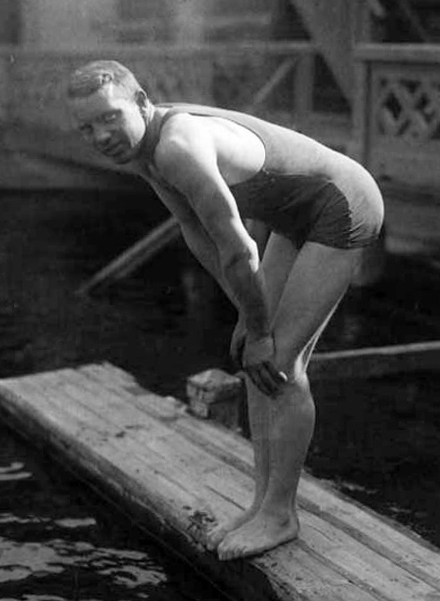

Personal information
- Born: 18 August 1901 Stockholm, Sweden
- Died: 6 June 1973 (aged 71) Stockholm, Sweden

Sport
- Sport: Swimming
- Club: Stockholms KK
Medal record
Representing Sweden
Olympic Games
Bronze medal – third place	1924 Paris	4×200 m freestyle
European championships
Bronze medal – third place	1926 Budapest	4×200 m freestyle
Silver medal – second place	1927 Bologna	4×200 m freestyle

Åke Borg (18 August 1901 – 6 June 1973) was a Swedish swimmer. Teaming with his twin brother Arne he won a bronze medal at the 1924 Olympics and two European championship medals in the 4×200 m freestyle relay.
