= Moss Christie =

Australian swimmer (1902-1978)

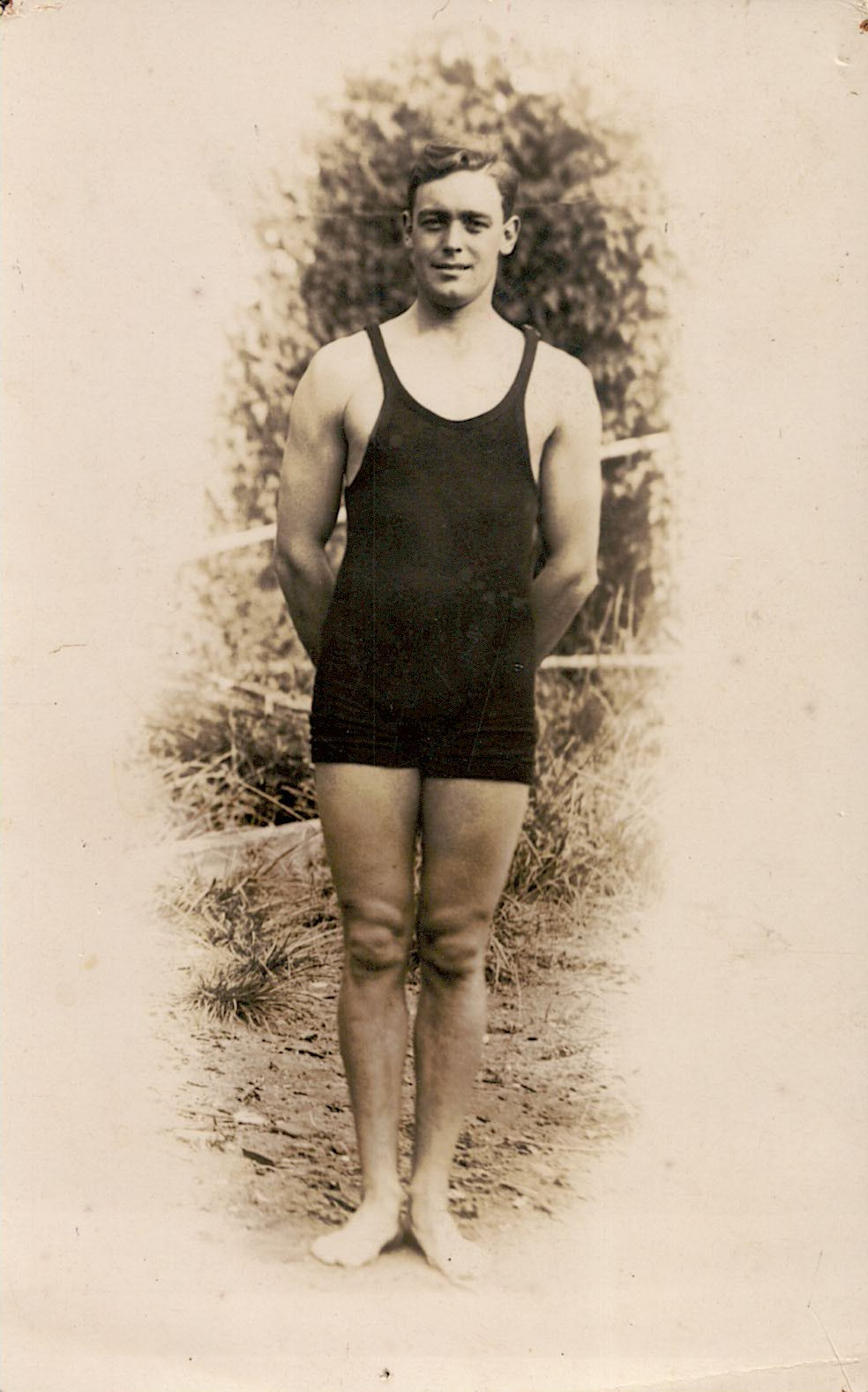
- Christie at Manly Baths in 1923

Personal information
- Full name: Maurice Froomes Christie
- Nickname: "Moss"
- National team: Australia
- Born: 18 September 1901 Sydney, New South Wales
- Died: 19 December 1978 (aged 77) Sydney, New South Wales
- Height: 1.80 m (5 ft 11 in)

Sport
- Sport: Swimming
- Strokes: Freestyle
Medal record
Men's swimming
Representing Australia
Olympic Games
| Silver medal – second place | 1924 Paris | 4x200 m freestyle relay |

Maurice Froomes "Moss" Christie (18 September 1901 – 19 December 1978) was an Australian freestyle swimmer of the 1920s who won a silver medal in the 4×200-metre freestyle relay at the 1924 Summer Olympics in Paris. His involvement in various national and state championship events continued for 2 decades from 1917 until 1937. During this time he won 13 National freestyle titles, 7 NSW freestyle championships whilst providing substantial contribution to the Drummoyne Amateur Swimming Club.

Combining with Boy Charlton, Ernest Henry and Frank Beaurepaire, the Australians trailed the Americans (featuring Johnny Weissmuller - later to star as Tarzan the Ape Man) home by almost nine seconds, in a race conducted in the River Seine. Christie had a disappointing campaign in the individual events, being eliminated in the heats of the 100-metre and 1500-metre freestyle and being disqualified for a false start in his heat of the 400-metre freestyle.

== See also ==
- List of Olympic medalists in swimming (men)

== Sources ==
- Andrews, Malcolm (2000). Australia at the Olympic Games. Sydney, New South Wales: ABC Books. p. 89. ISBN 0-7333-0884-8.
