= United States at the 1924 Summer Olympics =

- Flag of the United States
- IOC code: USA
- NOC: United States Olympic Committee

in Paris
- Competitors: 299 (275 men and 24 women) in 18 sports
- Flag bearer: Pat McDonald
- Medals Ranked 1st: Gold 45 Silver 27 Bronze 27 Total 99

Summer Olympics appearances (overview)
- 1896; 1900; 1904; 1908; 1912; 1920; 1924; 1928; 1932; 1936; 1948; 1952; 1956; 1960; 1964; 1968; 1972; 1976; 1980; 1984; 1988; 1992; 1996; 2000; 2004; 2008; 2012; 2016; 2020; 2024; 2028

Other related appearances
- 1906 Intercalated Games

The United States competed at the 1924 Summer Olympics in Paris, France. 299 competitors, 275 men and 24 women, took part in 108 events in 18 sports.

== Medalists ==
Medal	Name	Sport	Event	Date
Gold	United States national rugby union team: Charlie Austin; R. Brown; J. Cashel; Philip Clark; Norman Cleaveland; Hugh Cunningham; Dudley DeGroot; Robert Devereux; George Dixon; Charles Doe; Linn Farrish; Edward Graff; C. Grondona; Joseph Hunter; Richard Hyland; Caesar Mannelli; Charles Mehan; John Muldoon; William S. Muldoon; John O'Neil; John Patrick; William Rogers; Rudolph Scholz; Colby Slater; Norman Slater; Charles Lee Tilden, Jr.; Edward Turkington; Alan Valentine; Alan Williams	Rugby union		May 18
Gold	Morris Fisher	Shooting	Men's 600 m free rifle	June 27
Gold	Raymond Coulter; Joseph Crockett; Morris Fisher; Sidney Hinds; Walter Stokes	Shooting	Men's team free rifle	June 27
Gold	Henry Bailey	Shooting	Men's 25 m pistol	June 28
Gold	John Boles	Shooting	Men's 100 m running deer, single shots	June 30
Gold	Harold Osborn	Athletics	Men's high jump	July 7
Gold	Frederick Etchen; Frank Hughes; John Noel; Clarence Platt; Samuel Sharman; William Silkworth	Shooting	Men's team clay pigeons	July 7
Gold	DeHart Hubbard	Athletics	Men's long jump	July 8
Gold	Bud Houser	Athletics	Men's shot put	July 8
Gold	Jackson Scholz	Athletics	Men's 200 m	July 9
Gold	Daniel Kinsey	Athletics	Men's 110 m hurdles	July 9
Gold	Morgan Taylor	Athletics	Men's 400 m hurdles	July 9
Gold	Lee Barnes	Athletics	Men's pole vault	July 10
Gold	Fred Tootell	Athletics	Men's hammer throw	July 10
Gold	Harold Osborn	Athletics	Men's decathlon	July 12
Gold	Louis Clarke; Frank Hussey; Al LeConey; Loren Murchison	Athletics	Men's 4 × 100 m relay	July 13
Gold	Commodore Cochran; Alan Helffrich; Oliver MacDonald; William Stevenson	Athletics	Men's 4 × 400 m relay	July 13
Gold	Bud Houser	Athletics	Men's discus throw	July 13
Gold	Robin Reed	Wrestling	Men's freestyle featherweight	July 14
Gold	Russell Vis	Wrestling	Men's freestyle lightweight	July 14
Gold	John Spellman	Wrestling	Men's freestyle light heavyweight	July 14
Gold	Harry Steel	Wrestling	Men's freestyle heavyweight	July 14
Gold	Martha Norelius	Swimming	Women's 400 m freestyle	July 15
Gold	Albert White	Diving	Men's 3 m springboard	July 17
Gold	Paul Costello; John B. Kelly Sr.	Rowing	Men's double sculls	July 17
Gold	Leonard Carpenter; Howard Kingsbury; Alfred Lindley; John Miller; James Rockefeller; Frederick Sheffield; Benjamin Spock; Laurence Stoddard; Alfred Wilson	Rowing	Men's eight	July 17
Gold	Bob Skelton	Swimming	Men's 200 m breaststroke	July 17
Gold	Elizabeth Becker	Diving	Women's 3 m springboard	July 18
Gold	Euphrasia Donnelly; Gertrude Ederle; Ethel Lackie; Mariechen Wehselau	Swimming	Women's 4 × 100 m freestyle relay	July 18
Gold	Warren Kealoha	Swimming	Men's 100 m backstroke	July 18
Gold	Hazel Wightman; Helen Wills	Tennis	Women's doubles	July 19
Gold	Fidel LaBarba	Boxing	Men's flyweight	July 20
Gold	Jackie Fields	Boxing	Men's featherweight	July 20
Gold	Albert White	Diving	Men's 10 m platform	July 20
Gold	Caroline Smith	Diving	Women's 10 m platform	July 20
Gold	Johnny Weissmuller	Swimming	Men's 100 m freestyle	July 20
Gold	Johnny Weissmuller	Swimming	Men's 400 m freestyle	July 20
Gold	Ralph Breyer; Harry Glancy; Dick Howell; Wally O'Connor; Johnny Weissmuller	Swimming	Men's 4 × 200 m freestyle relay	July 20
Gold	Ethel Lackie	Swimming	Women's 100 m freestyle	July 20
Gold	Sybil Bauer	Swimming	Women's 400 m backstroke	July 20
Gold	Vincent Richards	Tennis	Men's singles	July 20
Gold	Helen Wills	Tennis	Women's singles	July 20
Gold	Frank Kriz	Gymnastics	Men's vault	July 21
Gold	Francis Hunter; Vincent Richards	Tennis	Men's doubles	July 21
Gold	Hazel Wightman; Richard Williams	Tennis	Mixed doubles	July 21
Silver	Marcus Dinwiddie	Shooting	Men's 50 m rifle, prone	June 23
Silver	Carl Osburn	Shooting	Men's 600 m free rifle	June 27
Silver	Jackson Scholz	Athletics	Men's 100 m	July 7
Silver	Leroy Brown	Athletics	Men's high jump	July 7
Silver	Edward Gourdin	Athletics	Men's long jump	July 8
Silver	Glenn Hartranft	Athletics	Men's shot put	July 8
Silver	Charley Paddock	Athletics	Men's 200 m	July 9
Silver	Glenn Graham	Athletics	Men's pole vault	July 10
Silver	Matt McGrath	Athletics	Men's hammer throw	July 10
Silver	Horatio Fitch	Athletics	Men's 400 m	July 11
Silver	August Fager; Earl Johnson; Arthur Studenroth	Athletics	Men's team cross country	July 12
Silver	Emerson Norton	Athletics	Men's decathlon	July 12
Silver	United States national polo team: Elmer Boeseke; Tommy Hitchcock, Jr.; Frederick Roe; Rodman Wanamaker	Polo		July 12
Silver	Chester Newton	Wrestling	Men's freestyle featherweight	July 14
Silver	Helen Wainwright	Swimming	Women's 400 m freestyle	July 15
Silver	Pete Desjardins	Diving	Men's 3 m springboard	July 17
Silver	William Gilmore	Rowing	Men's single sculls	July 17
Silver	Paul Wyatt	Swimming	Men's 100 m backstroke	July 18
Silver	Agnes Geraghty	Swimming	Women's 200 m breaststroke	July 18
Silver	Aileen Riggin	Diving	Women's 3 m springboard	July 18
Silver	Salvatore Tripoli	Boxing	Men's bantamweight	July 20
Silver	Joseph Salas	Boxing	Men's featherweight	July 20
Silver	David Fall	Diving	Men's 10 m platform	July 20
Silver	Elizabeth Becker	Diving	Women's 10 m platform	July 20
Silver	Duke Kahanamoku	Swimming	Men's 100 m freestyle	July 20
Silver	Mariechen Wehselau	Swimming	Women's 100 m freestyle	July 20
Silver	Marion Jessup; Vincent Richards	Tennis	Mixed doubles	July 21
Bronze	John Boles; Raymond Coulter; Dennis Fenton; Walter Stokes	Shooting	Men's 100 m team running deer, single shots	July 2
Bronze	Eugene Oberst	Athletics	Men's javelin throw	July 6
Bronze	Schuyler Enck	Athletics	Men's 800 m	July 7
Bronze	Robert LeGendre	Athletics	Men's pentathlon	July 7
Bronze	Ralph Hills	Athletics	Men's shot put	July 8
Bronze	Ivan Riley	Athletics	Men's 400 m hurdles	July 9
Bronze	Frank Hughes	Shooting	Men's trap	July 9
Bronze	James Brooker	Athletics	Men's pole vault	July 10
Bronze	Earl Johnson	Athletics	Men's individual cross country	July 12
Bronze	William Cox; Edward Kirby; Willard Tibbetts	Athletics	Men's 3000 m team race	July 13
Bronze	Clarence DeMar	Athletics	Men's marathon	July 13
Bronze	Tom Lieb	Athletics	Men's discus throw	July 13
Bronze	Bryan Hines	Wrestling	Men's freestyle bantamweight	July 14
Bronze	Clarence Pinkston	Diving	Men's 3 m springboard	July 17
Bronze	Leon Butler; Edward Jennings; Harold Wilson	Rowing	Men's coxed pair	July 17
Bronze	Bob Gerhardt; Sid Jelinek; John Kennedy; Ed Mitchell; Henry Welsford	Rowing	Men's coxed four	July 17
Bronze	Bob Skelton	Swimming	Men's 200 m breaststroke	July 17
Bronze	Caroline Fletcher	Diving	Women's 3 m springboard	July 18
Bronze	Raymond Fee	Boxing	Men's flyweight	July 20
Bronze	Frederick Boylstein	Boxing	Men's lightweight	July 20
Bronze	Clarence Pinkston	Diving	Men's 10 m platform	July 20
Bronze	Samuel Kahanamoku	Swimming	Men's 100 m freestyle	July 20
Bronze	Gertrude Ederle	Swimming	Women's 100 m freestyle	July 20
Bronze	Gertrude Ederle	Swimming	Women's 400 m freestyle	July 20
Bronze	Aileen Riggin	Swimming	Women's 100 m backstroke	July 20
Bronze	United States men's national water polo team: Arthur Austin; Elmer Collett; Jam Handy; Oliver Horn; Fred Lauer; George Mitchell; John Norton; Wally O'Connor; George Schroth; Herb Vollmer; Johnny Weissmuller	Water polo		July 20
Bronze	Sloan Doak	Equestrian	Individual eventing	July 26

== Athletics ==
Ninety-six athletes represented the United States in 1924. It was the nation's seventh appearance in the sport. The United States was one of three nations, along with Great Britain and Greece, to have competed in each edition of the Olympic athletics program to that point. The American team had competitors in each of the 27 events, with the maximum number of entries in all but 3 of them (the United States did not send full teams for the steeplechase, the racewalk, or the triple jump). The United States had finalists in every event except the triple jump. The team swept the medals in two events: the pole vault and the shot put.

The United States won 32 medals overall, almost twice that of the next most successful nation (Finland). The 12 gold medals won by the Americans were two more than Finland won, putting the United States at the top of the leaderboard for the sport. Houser and Osborn were the most successful individuals, with two gold medals apiece. Earl Johnson and Scholz won two medals each. Thirty-three other athletes won medals, bringing the total to 37 of 96 participants taking medals.

Ranks given are within the heat.

Athlete	Event	Heats		Quarterfinals		Semifinals		Final	
Athlete	Event	Result	Rank	Result	Rank	Result	Rank	Result	Rank
Karl Anderson	110 m hurdles	N/A		15.4	1 Q	15.4	2 Q	Unknown	5
Norman Anderson	Shot put	N/A				14.29	1 Q	14.29	5
Otto Anderson	Decathlon	N/A						Did not finish	
Clifford Argue	Pentathlon	N/A						Did not finish	
Lee Barnes	Pole vault	N/A				3.66	1 Q	3.95	1st place, gold medalist(s)
Verne Booth	10000 m	N/A						Did not finish	
Verne Booth	Cross country	N/A						Did not finish	
Chester Bowman	100 m	11.0	1 Q	10.8	1 Q	10.7	3 Q	10.9	4
James Brooker	Pole vault	N/A				3.66	1 Q	3.90	3rd place, bronze medalist(s)
Charles Brookins	400 m hurdles	N/A		54.8	1 Q	54.6	1 Q	Disqualified	
Leroy Brown	High jump	N/A				1.83	1 Q	1.95	2nd place, silver medalist(s)
Ray Buker	1500 m	N/A				4:12.8	2 Q	3:58.6	5
William Churchill	Marathon	N/A						3:19:18.0	23
William Comins	Long jump	N/A				No mark	8	Did not advance	
Chan Coulter	400 m hurdles	N/A		55.0	1 Q	58.6	4	Did not advance	
Clarence DeMar	Marathon	N/A						2:48:14.0	3rd place, bronze medalist(s)
Michael Devaney	3000 m steeplechase	N/A				Unknown	2 Q	10:01.0	7
Ray Dodge	800 m	N/A		Unknown	3 Q	1:57.0	1 Q	1:54.2	6
Eastman Doolittle	5000 m	N/A				Unknown	7	Did not advance	
Schuyler Enck	800 m	N/A		1:58.6	3 Q	1:57.6	2 Q	1:53.0	3rd place, bronze medalist(s)
August Fager	Cross country	N/A						37:40.6	8
Horatio Fitch	400 m	52.0	1 Q	49.0	1 Q	47.8 OR	1 Q	48.4	2nd place, silver medalist(s)
Charles Foster	10 km walk	N/A				Disqualified		Did not advance	
Harry Frieda	Decathlon	N/A						6618.300	8
Edward Gourdin	Long jump	N/A				7.19	1 Q	7.275	2nd place, silver medalist(s)
Glenn Graham	Pole vault	N/A				3.66	1 Q	3.95	2nd place, silver medalist(s)
Merwin Graham	Triple jump	N/A				14.000	4	Did not advance	
John Gray	10000 m	N/A						Unknown	15
John Gray	Cross country	N/A						Did not finish	
George Guthrie	110 m hurdles	N/A		15.8	1 Q	15.2	1 Q	Disqualified	
Lloyd Hahn	1500 m	N/A				4:06.8	1 Q	3:59.0	6
Brutus Hamilton	Pentathlon	N/A						Elim-4	
Glenn Hartranft	Shot put	N/A				14.405	2 Q	14.895	2nd place, silver medalist(s)
Glenn Hartranft	Discus throw	N/A				42.49	2 Q	42.49	6
James Henigan	Cross country	N/A						38:00.0	11
George Hill	200 m	22.0	1 Q	21.8	1 Q	21.8	2 Q	22.0	4
Ralph Hills	Shot put	N/A				14.505	2 Q	14.64	3rd place, bronze medalist(s)
Harry Hinkel	10 km walk	N/A				Unknown	3 Q	50:16.8	9
Bud Houser	Shot put	N/A				14.995	1 Q	14.995	1st place, gold medalist(s)
Bud Houser	Discus throw	N/A				46.155 OR	1 Q	46.155	1st place, gold medalist(s)
DeHart Hubbard	Long jump	N/A				7.12	1 Q	7.445	1st place, gold medalist(s)
DeHart Hubbard	Triple jump	N/A				No mark	10	Did not advance	
Earl Johnson	10000 m	N/A						32:17.0	8
Earl Johnson	Cross country	N/A						35:21.0	3rd place, bronze medalist(s)
Pitch Johnson	110 m hurdles	N/A		16.6	1 Q	15.8	3	Did not advance	
Wayne Johnson	10000 m	N/A						Did not finish	
Robert Juday	High jump	N/A				No mark	5	Did not advance	
Mort Kaer	Pentathlon	N/A						24	5
Daniel Kinsey	110 m hurdles	N/A		15.4	1 Q	15.4	1 Q	15.0	1st place, gold medalist(s)
Robert LeGendre	Pentathlon	N/A						18	3rd place, bronze medalist(s)
George Lermond	5000 m	N/A				Unknown	8	Did not advance	
Thomas Lieb	Discus throw	N/A				44.83	1 Q	44.83	3rd place, bronze medalist(s)
James McEachern	Hammer throw	N/A				44.935	6 Q	45.225	6
Matt McGrath	Hammer throw	N/A				47.075	4 Q	50.84	2nd place, silver medalist(s)
Charles Mellor	Marathon	N/A						3:24:07.0	25
Jack Merchant	Hammer throw	N/A				41.455	9	Did not advance	
Loren Murchison	100 m	10.8	1 Q	10.8	1 Q	11.2	3 Q	11.0	6
William Neufeld	Javelin throw	N/A				56.96	1 Q	56.96	5
Bayes Norton	200 m	21.8	1 Q	22.3	1 Q	22.1	3 Q	22.0	5
Emerson Norton	Decathlon	N/A						7350.895	2nd place, silver medalist(s)
Eugene Oberst	Javelin throw	N/A				57.98	3 Q	57.98	3rd place, bronze medalist(s)
Harold Osborn	High jump	N/A				1.83	1 Q	1.98	1st place, gold medalist(s)
Harold Osborn	Decathlon	N/A						7710.775	1st place, gold medalist(s)
Charles Paddock	100 m	11.2	1 Q	10.8	1 Q	10.7	2 Q	10.9	5
Charles Paddock	200 m	22.3	2 Q	22.2	1 Q	21.8	1 Q	21.7	2nd place, silver medalist(s)
Russell Payne	3000 m steeplechase	N/A				Unknown	5	Did not advance	
Harold Phelps	5000 m	N/A				Unknown	6	Did not advance	
Tom Poor	High jump	N/A				1.83	1 Q	1.88	4
Gus Pope	Discus throw	N/A				44.42	1 Q	44.42	4
Lee Priester	Javelin throw	N/A				54.51	6	Did not advance	
Bill Richardson	800 m	N/A		1:59.6	2 Q	1:55.0	2 Q	1:53.8	5
Marvin Rick	3000 m steeplechase	N/A				10:11.0	2 Q	9:56.4	4
Ivan Riley	400 m hurdles	N/A		55.4	1 Q	56.6	1 Q	54.2	3rd place, bronze medalist(s)
Ray Robertson	400 m	50.2	1 Q	49.5	3	Did not advance			
John Romig	5000 m	N/A				15:14.6	1 Q	15:12.4	4
Albert Rose	Long jump	N/A				6.855	4	Did not advance	
Jackson Scholz	100 m	10.8	1 Q	10.8	1 Q	10.8	1 Q	10.7	2nd place, silver medalist(s)
Jackson Scholz	200 m	22.4	1 Q	21.8	1 Q	21.8	1 Q	21.6 =OR	1st place, gold medalist(s)
Ralph Spearow	Pole vault	N/A				3.66	1 Q	3.70	6
William Spencer	1500 m	N/A				4:08.4	3	Did not advance	
Arthur Studenroth	Cross country	N/A						36:45.4	6
John Coard Taylor	400 m	50.8	1 Q	50.4	2 Q	48.7	3 Q	1:07.0	5
Morgan Taylor	400 m hurdles	N/A		55.8	1 Q	54.9	2 Q	52.6	1st place, gold medalist(s)
Fred Tootell	Hammer throw	N/A				50.60	1 Q	53.285	1st place, gold medalist(s)
Ray Watson	1500 m	N/A				4:17.9	2 Q	4:00.0	7
John Watters	800 m	N/A		1:59.8	2 Q	1:57.4	3 Q	1:54.8	7
Homer Welchel	Javelin throw	N/A				52.98	6	Did not advance	
Frank Wendling	Marathon	N/A						3:05:09.8	16
Ralph Williams	Marathon	N/A						Did not finish	
Earle Wilson	Triple jump	N/A				14.235	4	Did not advance	
Eric Wilson	400 m	49.6	1 Q	48.8	3	Did not advance			
Frank Zuna	Marathon	N/A						3:05:52.2	18
Louis Clarke; Frank Hussey; Alfred LeConey; Loren Murchison	4 × 100 m relay	N/A		41.2 WR	1 Q	41.0 WR	1 Q	42.2	1st place, gold medalist(s)
Commodore Cochran; Alan Helffrich; Oliver MacDonald; William Stevenson	4 × 400 m relay	N/A				3:27.0	1 Q	3:16.0 WR	1st place, gold medalist(s)
James Connolly; William Cox; Edward Kirby; Leo Larrivee; Joie Ray; Willard Tibbetts	3000 m team	N/A				9	1 Q	25	3rd place, bronze medalist(s)
Verne Booth; August Fager; John Gray; James Henigan; Earl Johnson; Arthur Studenroth	Team cross country	N/A						14	2nd place, silver medalist(s)

== Boxing ==
Sixteen boxers represented the United States at the 1924 Games; the U.S. was one of four countries (along with France, Great Britain, and Italy) to send two boxers in each weight class. It was the nation's third appearance in the sport. The two gold medals won by Americans matched Britain's pair of golds. The United States team won the most overall medals with six.

In two weight classes, both American boxers won medals. The featherweight final featured two Americans, with Fields coming out on top. LaBarba won the flyweight, with Fee taking the bronze in that weight class. All six medals came in the lightest four weight classes, with Tripoli's silver in the bantamweight and Boylstein's bronze in the lightweight rounding out the total.

Boxer	Weight class	Round of 32	Round of 16	Quarterfinals	Semifinals	Final / Bronze match	
Boxer	Weight class	Opposition Score	Opposition Score	Opposition Score	Opposition Score	Opposition Score	Rank
Frederick Boylstein	Lightweight	Bye	Shorter (GBR); W	Genon (BEL); W	Nielsen (DEN); L	Tholey (FRA); W	3rd place, bronze medalist(s)
Eddie Eagan	Heavyweight	N/A	Clifton (GBR); L	Did not advance			9
Raymond Fee	Flyweight	Bye	Catada (ARG); W	Bergström (SWE); W	McKenzie (GBR); L	Castellenghi (ITA); W	3rd place, bronze medalist(s)
Jackie Fields	Featherweight	Doyle (IRL); W	Hansen (NOR); W	Abarca (CHI); W	Quartucci (ARG); W	Salas (USA); W	1st place, gold medalist(s)
Ben Funk	Middleweight	Jones (AUS); W	Beecken (BEL); L	Did not advance			9
Ed Greathouse	Heavyweight	N/A	Galinat (FRA); W	Porzio (ARG); L	Did not advance		5
Hugh Haggerty	Welterweight	Świtek (POL); W	Ertmański (POL); W	Lewis (CAN); L	Did not advance		5
Tom Kirby	Light heavyweight	Bye	Welter (LUX); W	Sørsdal (NOR); L	Did not advance		5
Fidel LaBarba	Flyweight	Warwick (GBR); W	Lanzi (ITA); W	Rennie (CAN); W	Castellenghi (ITA); W	McKenzie (GBR); W	1st place, gold medalist(s)
Joseph Lazarus	Bantamweight	Bye	Andrén (SWE); L	Did not advance			9
Adolphe Lefkowitch	Middleweight	Bye	Black (CAN); L	Did not advance			9
Al Mello	Welterweight	Doussot (FRA); W	Christensen (NOR); W	Méndez (ARG); L	Did not advance		5
George Mulholland	Light heavyweight	Bye	Belanger (CAN); W	Petersen (DEN); L	Did not advance		5
Ben Rothwell	Lightweight	Kelleher (IRL); W	Graham (CAN); W	Copello (ARG); L	Did not advance		5
Joseph Salas	Featherweight	Burlie (CAN); W	Levij (NED); W	Petrarca (ITA); W	Devergnies (BEL); W	Fields (USA); L	2nd place, silver medalist(s)
Salvatore Tripoli	Bantamweight	Usaveaga (CHI); W	Tarrant (GBR); W	Pertuzzo (ARG); W	Andrén (SWE); W	Smith (RSA); L	2nd place, silver medalist(s)

Opponent nation	Wins	Losses	Percent
Argentina	3	3	.500
Australia	1	0	1.000
Belgium	2	1	.667
Canada	4	2	.667
Chile	2	0	1.000
Denmark	0	2	.000
France	3	0	1.000
Great Britain	4	2	.667
Ireland	2	0	1.000
Italy	4	0	1.000
Luxembourg	1	0	1.000
Netherlands	1	0	1.000
Norway	2	1	.667
Poland	2	0	1.000
South Africa	0	1	.000
Sweden	2	1	.667
Total international	33	13	.717
United States	1	1	.500
Total	34	14	.708

Round	Wins	Losses	Percent
Round of 32	8	0	1.000
Round of 16	12	4	.750
Quarterfinals	6	6	.500
Semifinals	4	2	.667
Final	2	2	.500
Bronze match	2	0	1.000
Total	34	14	.708

== Cycling ==
Five cyclists represented the United States in 1924. It was the nation's sixth appearance in the sport, matching France for most appearances.

=== Road cycling ===
Cyclist	Event	Final	
Cyclist	Event	Result	Rank
John Boulicault	Time trial	7:15:51.6	33
Ignatius Gronkowski	Time trial	7:34:41.8	45
Gustav Hentschel	Time trial	7:52:59.6	49
Victor Hopkins	Time trial	8:29:02.0	58
John Boulicault; Ignatius Gronkowski; Gustav Hentschel; Victor Hopkins	Team time trial	22:43:33.0	12

=== Track cycling ===
Ranks given are within the heat.

Cyclist	Event	First round		First repechage		Quarterfinals		Second repechage		Semifinals		Final	
Cyclist	Event	Result	Rank	Result	Rank	Result	Rank	Result	Rank	Result	Rank	Result	Rank
William Fenn	50 km	N/A										Unknown	8–36
William Fenn	Sprint	13.6	1 Q	Advanced directly		Unknown	2 r	Unknown	2	Did not advance			
Ignatius Gronkowski	50 km	N/A										Unknown	8–36

== Diving ==
Ten divers, five men and five women, represented the United States in 1924. It was the nation's fifth appearance in the sport; the United States was the only nation to have appeared at each Olympic diving competition to that point. The Americans were dominant, sweeping the medals in three of the five events and taking the top two places in a fourth. The United States entered three divers in each event for a total of 15 entries; 11 resulted in medals while all 15 advanced to the finals. White was the top individual diver, with gold medals in both of his events. Becker won a gold and a silver. Smith took a gold, while Pinkston took a pair of bronzes. Riggin, Fall, and Desjardins each won a silver, and Fletcher took a bronze. Thrash and Meany were the only two Americans to not win medals.

Ranks given are within the heat.

Men

Diver	Event	Semifinals			Final		
Diver	Event	Points	Score	Rank	Points	Score	Rank
Pete Desjardins	3 m board	5	662.8	1 Q	8	693.2	2nd place, silver medalist(s)
Pete Desjardins	Plain high diving	13.5	155	2 Q	28	141	6
David Fall	10 m platform	6	472.9	1 Q	11.5	486.5	2nd place, silver medalist(s)
Clarence Pinkston	3 m board	5	672	1 Q	15	653	3rd place, bronze medalist(s)
Clarence Pinkston	10 m platform	6	507.5	1 Q	16.5	473	3rd place, bronze medalist(s)
Clarence Pinkston	Plain high diving	10	157	2 Q	41	125	9
Ben Thrash	Plain high diving	17	146	2 Q	23.5	145	4
Albert White	3 m board	5	681.9	1 Q	7	696.4	1st place, gold medalist(s)
Albert White	10 m platform	5	491.8	1 Q	9	487.3	1st place, gold medalist(s)

Women

Diver	Event	Semifinals			Final		
Diver	Event	Points	Score	Rank	Points	Score	Rank
Elizabeth Becker-Pinkston	3 m board	6	482.4	1 Q	8	474.5	1st place, gold medalist(s)
Elizabeth Becker-Pinkston	10 m platform	11	161	1 Q	11	166	2nd place, silver medalist(s)
Caroline Fletcher	3 m board	7	446.6	1 Q	16	436.4	3rd place, bronze medalist(s)
Helen Meany	10 m platform	16.5	152	3 Q	22	148	5
Aileen Riggin	3 m board	13	439.3	2 Q	12	460.4	2nd place, silver medalist(s)
Caroline Smith	10 m platform	5.5	160	1 Q	10.5	167	1st place, gold medalist(s)

== Equestrian ==
Five equestrians represented the United States in 1924. It was the nation's fourth appearance in the sport; the United States was the only nation to have taken part in each Olympic equestrian competition to date. Doak won the individual eventing bronze, the United States's first medal since 1912 and matching their all-time best result in the sport. Doak and Carr, who finished eighth in the eventing, gave the United States a strong shot at silver in the team competition, but neither Barry nor Padgett finished and so the team did not get a score. Padgett, this time along with Bontecou, again did not finish in the show jumping competition, and the United States did not get a score in that competition either. Barry's 25th place was the best individual result in show jumping.

Equestrian	Event	Final		
Equestrian	Event	Score	Time	Rank
John Barry	Eventing	Did not finish		
John Barry	Jumping	27.25	2:40.0	25
Frederic Bontecou	Jumping	Did not finish		
Frank Carr	Eventing	1727.0	N/A	8
Sloan Doak	Eventing	1845.5	N/A	3rd place, bronze medalist(s)
Sloan Doak	Jumping	32.00	2:23.0	29
Vernon Padgett	Eventing	Did not finish		
Vernon Padgett	Jumping	Did not finish		
John Barry; Frederic Bontecou; Sloan Doak; Vernon Padgett	Team eventing	Did not finish		
John Barry; Frank Carr; Sloan Doak; Vernon Padgett	Team eventing	Did not finish		

== Fencing ==
21 fencers, 19 men and 2 women, represented the United States in 1924. It was the nation's fifth appearance in the sport; the United States was one of nine nations to send women to the first Olympic women's fencing competition.

Men

Ranks given are within the pool.

Fencer	Event	Round 1		Round 2		Quarterfinals		Semifinals		Final	
Fencer	Event	Result	Rank	Result	Rank	Result	Rank	Result	Rank	Result	Rank
Harold Bloomer	Foil	1–2	3 Q	1–4	6	Did not advance					
Burke Boyce	Foil	2–2	2 Q	1–3	5	Did not advance					
George Breed	Épée	5–4	4 Q	N/A		1–8	10	Did not advance			
George Calnan	Épée	5–4	3 Q	N/A		3–7	8	Did not advance			
George Calnan	Foil	3–1	2 Q	4–1	1 Q	3–2	3 Q	1–4	5	Did not advance	
Laurence Castner	Sabre	N/A				3–2	3 Q	1–7	9	Did not advance	
Ernest Gignoux	Sabre	N/A				3–3	6	Did not advance			
Thomas Jeter	Foil	Did not finish		Did not advance							
Arthur Lyon	Épée	3–5	7	N/A		Did not advance					
Arthur Lyon	Sabre	N/A				1–6	6	Did not advance			
Chauncey McPherson	Sabre	N/A				2–4	6	Did not advance			
Allen Milner	Épée	5–3	2 Q	N/A		5–5	5 Q	4–7	12	Did not advance	
Philip Allison; Burke Boyce; George Breed; George Calnan; Thomas Jeter; Alfred Walker	Team foil	1–0	2 Q	N/A		0–2	3	Did not advance			
George Breed; George Calnan; Arthur Lyon; Allan Milner; William Russell; Leon Shore; Donald Waldhaus	Team épée	1–0	2 Q	N/A		1–0	2 Q	0–2	3	Did not advance	
Laurence Castner; Edwin Fullinwider; Ernest Gignoux; Arthur Lyon; Chauncey McPherson; Joseph Parker; Albert Strauss; Harold Van Buskirk	Team sabre	2–1	2 Q	N/A		0–2	4	Did not advance			

Women

Ranks given are within the pool.

Fencer	Event	Quarterfinals		Semifinals		Final	
Fencer	Event	Result	Rank	Result	Rank	Result	Rank
Adelaide Gehrig	Foil	2–3	4	Did not advance			
Irma Hopper	Foil	2–4	6	Did not advance			

== Football ==
The United States competed in the Olympic football tournament for the second time in 1924.

Round 1

May 25, 1924
17:15

United States	1–0	Estonia
Straden 15' (pen.)	Report

Stade Pershing
Attendance: 8,110
Referee: Paul Putz (BEL)

Round 2

May 29, 1924
17:00

Uruguay	3–0	United States
Petrone 10' 44'; Scarone 15'	Report

Stade Bergeyre
Attendance: 10,455
Referee: Charles Barette (BEL)

Final rank
9th

Roster:

- Aage Brix
- Sam Dalrymple
- Irving Davis
- William Demko
- Jimmy Douglas
- Henry Farrell
- William Findlay
- Edward Hart
- Raymond Hornberger
- Carl Johnson
- F. Burke Jones
- Jakes Mulholland
- Fred O'Connor
- Arthur Rudd
- Andy Straden
- Herbert Wells

- Coach: George M. Collins

== Gymnastics ==
Eight gymnasts represented the United States in 1924. It was the nation's third appearance in the sport. Kriz took the nation's only medal, with the gold in the vault.

=== Artistic ===
Gymnast	Event	Final	
Gymnast	Event	Score	Rank
Al Jochim	All-around	95.090	31
Al Jochim	Horizontal bar	17.060	23
Al Jochim	Parallel bars	19.86	30
Al Jochim	Pommel horse	19.000	12
Al Jochim	Rings	18.080	29
Al Jochim	Rope climbing	2 (11.6 s)	55
Al Jochim	Sidehorse vault	9.51	20
Al Jochim	Vault	9.58	11
Frank Kriz	All-around	100.293	19
Frank Kriz	Horizontal bar	17.500	18
Frank Kriz	Parallel bars	19.67	32
Frank Kriz	Pommel horse	17.930	21
Frank Kriz	Rings	15.413	49
Frank Kriz	Rope climbing	10 (8.4 s)	6
Frank Kriz	Sidehorse vault	9.80	8
Frank Kriz	Vault	9.98	1st place, gold medalist(s)
John Mais	All-around	72.770	53
John Mais	Horizontal bar	13.930	45
John Mais	Parallel bars	15.07	64
John Mais	Pommel horse	12.770	50
John Mais	Rings	12.160	62
John Mais	Rope climbing	2 (11.6 s)	55
John Mais	Sidehorse vault	9.26	26
John Mais	Vault	7.58	31
Rudolph Novak	All-around	77.593	46
Rudolph Novak	Horizontal bar	9.703	69
Rudolph Novak	Parallel bars	14.90	65
Rudolph Novak	Pommel horse	15.430	39
Rudolph Novak	Rings	15.160	51
Rudolph Novak	Rope climbing	7 (9.6 s)	31
Rudolph Novak	Sidehorse vault	8.40	49
Rudolph Novak	Vault	7.00	43
John Pearson	All-around	89.852	37
John Pearson	Horizontal bar	15.990	32
John Pearson	Parallel bars	18.81	42
John Pearson	Pommel horse	15.096	43
John Pearson	Rings	13.746	58
John Pearson	Rope climbing	10 (8.6 s)	10
John Pearson	Sidehorse vault	8.71	41
John Pearson	Vault	7.50	32
Curtis Rottman	All-around	82.946	42
Curtis Rottman	Horizontal bar	16.330	28
Curtis Rottman	Parallel bars	18.54	44
Curtis Rottman	Pommel horse	15.326	40
Curtis Rottman	Rings	11.910	63
Curtis Rottman	Rope climbing	2 (11.4 s)	51
Curtis Rottman	Sidehorse vault	9.26	26
Curtis Rottman	Vault	9.58	11
Frank Safandra	All-around	86.953	41
Frank Safandra	Horizontal bar	12.900	50
Frank Safandra	Parallel bars	18.35	46
Frank Safandra	Pommel horse	17.460	26
Frank Safandra	Rings	17.583	35
Frank Safandra	Rope climbing	10 (8.8 s)	13
Frank Safandra	Sidehorse vault	3.00	70
Frank Safandra	Vault	7.66	29
Max Wandrer	All-around	76.320	48
Max Wandrer	Horizontal bar	10.240	66
Max Wandrer	Parallel bars	14.89	66
Max Wandrer	Pommel horse	11.690	52
Max Wandrer	Rings	10.000	67
Max Wandrer	Rope climbing	10 (8.8 s)	13
Max Wandrer	Sidehorse vault	9.65	15
Max Wandrer	Vault	9.85	5
Frank Kriz; Al Jochim; John Pearson; Frank Safandra; Curtis Rottman; Rudolph Novak; Max Wandrer; John Mais	Team	715.117	5

== Modern pentathlon ==
Four pentathletes represented the United States in 1924. It was the nation's third appearance in the sport. The United States was one of six nations to have competed in each edition of the Olympic modern pentathlon to that point.

Pentathlete	Event	Final	
Pentathlete	Event	Score	Rank
George Bare	Individual	76.5	11
Ernest Harmon	Individual	130.5	31
Frederick Pitts	Individual	138.5	34
Donald Scott	Individual	111.5	26

== Polo ==
The United States sent a polo team to the Olympics for the third time in 1924. The Americans won their first three games, against the three European sides, and faced Argentina in their final game. Despite having a late lead, the United States was unable to finish off the Argentinians, who came from behind to beat the United States. The United States finished with the silver medal.

Ranks given are within the pool.

Players	Event	Round robin				
Players	Event	Wins	Losses	Points for	Points against	Rank
Elmer Boeseke; Tommy Hitchcock, Jr. Fred Roe; Rodman Wanamaker	Men's polo	3	1	43	11	2nd place, silver medalist(s)

June 28

United States	13–1	France

July 1

United States	15–2	Spain

July 3

United States	10–2	Great Britain

July 6

Argentina	6–5	United States

== Rowing ==
20 rowers represented the United States in 1924. It was the nation's fourth appearance in the sport. All five of the American boats won medals: two golds, a silver, and a pair of bronzes.

Ranks given are within the heat.

Rower	Event	Semifinals		Repechage		Final	
Rower	Event	Result	Rank	Result	Rank	Result	Rank
William Gilmore	Single sculls	7:03.2	1 Q	Advanced directly		7:54.0	2nd place, silver medalist(s)
Paul Costello; Jack Kelly	Double sculls	6:34.0	1 Q	N/A		6:34.0	1st place, gold medalist(s)
Leon Butler; Edward Jennings; Harold Wilson	Coxed pair	Unknown	2 Q	N/A		Unknown	3rd place, bronze medalist(s)
Bob Gerhardt; Sid Jelinek; John Kennedy; Ed Mitchell; Henry Welsford	Coxed four	7:19.0	1 Q	Advanced directly		Unknown	3rd place, bronze medalist(s)
Leonard Carpenter; Howard Kingsbury; Alfred Lindley; John Miller; James Rockefeller; Frederick Sheffield; Laurence Stoddard; Benjamin Spock; Alfred Wilson	Eight	5:51.0	1 Q	Advanced directly		6:33.4	1st place, gold medalist(s)

== Rugby union ==
The United States sent a rugby team to the Olympics for the second time in 1924. The defending champions won their first game against Romania, 37 to 0. As France had already beaten Romania, the three-team round-robin finished with the France-United States match. The Americans won 17 to 3 to become the first team to successfully defend an Olympic rugby championship.

Ranks given are within the pool.

Team	Event	Round robin				
Team	Event	Wins	Losses	Points for	Points against	Rank
United States	Men's rugby union	2	0	54	3	1st place, gold medalist(s)

May 11

United States	37–0	Romania

Stade Olympique
May 18

United States	17–3	France

Stade Olympique

== Shooting ==
Twenty-one sport shooters represented the United States in 1924.

Shooter	Event	Final	
Shooter	Event	Score	Rank
Henry Bailey	25 m rapid fire pistol	18	1st place, gold medalist(s)
Bernard Betke	25 m rapid fire pistol	17	9
John Boles	50 m rifle, prone	389	12
John Boles	100 m deer, single shots	40	1st place, gold medalist(s)
John Boles	100 m deer, double shots	64	7
Raymond Coulter	100 m deer, single shots	32	17
Raymond Coulter	100 m deer, double shots	62	9
Marcus Dinwiddie	50 m rifle, prone	396	2nd place, silver medalist(s)
Frederick Etchen	Trap	89	24
Wilford Fawcett	Trap	91	18
Dennis Fenton	600 m free rifle	82	24
Dennis Fenton	100 m deer, single shots	34	12
Dennis Fenton	100 m deer, double shots	49	24
Morris Fisher	600 m free rifle	95	1st place, gold medalist(s)
William Frazer	25 m rapid fire pistol	17	9
John Grier	50 m rifle, prone	389	12
Frank Hughes	Trap	97	3rd place, bronze medalist(s)
Carl Osburn	600 m free rifle	95	2nd place, silver medalist(s)
Samuel Sharman	Trap	96	6
Walter Stokes	50 m rifle, prone	390	10
Walter Stokes	600 m free rifle	92	4
Walter Stokes	100 m deer, single shots	35	10
Walter Stokes	100 m deer, double shots	60	12
William Whaling	25 m rapid fire pistol	17	9
John Boles; Raymond Coulter; Dennis Fenton; Walter Stokes	Team deer, single shots	148	3rd place, bronze medalist(s)
John Boles; Raymond Coulter; Dennis Fenton; Walter Stokes	Team deer, double shots	233	5
Raymond Coulter; Joseph Crockett; Morris Fisher; Sidney Hinds; Walter Stokes	Team free rifle	676	1st place, gold medalist(s)
Frederick Etchen; Frank Hughes; John Noel; Clarence Platt; Samuel Sharman; William Silkworth	Team clay pigeons	363	1st place, gold medalist(s)

== Swimming ==
Ranks given are within the heat.

Men

Swimmer	Event	Heats		Semifinals		Final	
Swimmer	Event	Result	Rank	Result	Rank	Result	Rank
Ralph Breyer	400 m freestyle	5:22.4 OR	1 Q	DNS	—	Did not advance	
Dick Howell	1500 m freestyle	22:48.2	3 q	DNS	—	Did not advance	
Duke Kahanamoku	100 m freestyle	1:04.2	1 Q	1:01.6	1 Q	1:01.4	2nd place, silver medalist(s)
Samuel Kahanamoku	100 m freestyle	1:03.2	1 Q	1:02.2	2 Q	1:01.8	3rd place, bronze medalist(s)
Warren Kealoha	100 m backstroke	1:13.4 OR	1 Q	1:13.6	1 Q	1:13.2 OR	1st place, gold medalist(s)
Bill Kirschbaum	200 m breaststroke	3:01.0 OR	1 Q	3:02.6	2 Q	3:01.0	3rd place, bronze medalist(s)
Henry Luning	100 m backstroke	DSQ	—	Did not advance			
Bob Skelton	200 m breaststroke	2:56.0 OR	1 Q	3:00.2	1 Q	2:56.6	1st place, gold medalist(s)
Adam Smith	1500 m freestyle	22:48.8	2 Q	22:39.8	4	Did not advance	
Lester Smith	400 m freestyle	5:32.4	1 Q	5:37.6	3	Did not advance	
Johnny Weissmuller	100 m freestyle	1:03.8	1 Q	1:00.8 OR	1 Q	59.0 OR	1st place, gold medalist(s)
Johnny Weissmuller	400 m freestyle	5:22.2 OR	1 Q	5:13.6 OR	1 Q	5:04.2 OR	1st place, gold medalist(s)
Paul Wyatt	100 m backstroke	1:19.4	1 Q	1:17.0	2 Q	1:15.4	2nd place, silver medalist(s)
Ralph Breyer; Harry Glancy; Dick Howell^{*} Wally O'Connor; Johnny Weissmuller	4 × 200 m freestyle relay	10:41.6	1 Q	9:59.4 WR	1 Q	9:53.4 WR	1st place, gold medalist(s)

^{*} – Indicates athlete swam in the preliminaries but not in the final race.

Women

Swimmer	Event	Heats		Semifinals		Final	
Swimmer	Event	Result	Rank	Result	Rank	Result	Rank
Sybil Bauer	100 m backstroke	—N/a		1:24.0 OR	1 Q	1:23.2 OR	1st place, gold medalist(s)
Florence Chambers	100 m backstroke	—N/a		1:32.0	3 q	1:30.8	4
Eleanor Coleman	200 m breaststroke	—N/a		3:39.2	3	Did not advance	
Gertrude Ederle	100 m freestyle	1:12.6	1 Q	1:15.4	1 Q	1:14.2	3rd place, bronze medalist(s)
Gertrude Ederle	400 m freestyle	6:12.2 OR	1 Q	6:23.8	1 Q	6:04.8	3rd place, bronze medalist(s)
Agnes Geraghty	200 m breaststroke	—N/a		3:27.6 OR	1 Q	3:34.0	2nd place, silver medalist(s)
Ethel Lackie	100 m freestyle	1:12.8	1 Q	1:16.0	2 Q	1:12.4	1st place, gold medalist(s)
Martha Norelius	400 m freestyle	6:23.2	1 Q	6:26.6	2 Q	6:02.2 OR	1st place, gold medalist(s)
Aileen Riggin	100 m backstroke	—N/a		1:29.6	1 Q	1:28.2	3rd place, bronze medalist(s)
Matilda Scheurich	200 m breaststroke	—N/a		3:41.2	3	Did not advance	
Helen Wainwright	400 m freestyle	6:46.8	1 Q	6:19.6	1 Q	6:03.8	2nd place, silver medalist(s)
Mariechen Wehselau	100 m freestyle	1:12.2 WR	1 Q	1:15.2	1 Q	1:12.8	2nd place, silver medalist(s)
Euphrasia Donnelly; Gertrude Ederle; Ethel Lackie; Mariechen Wehselau	4 × 100 m freestyle relay	—N/a				4:58.8 WR	1st place, gold medalist(s)

== Tennis ==
Men

Athlete	Event	Round of 128	Round of 64	Round of 32	Round of 16	Quarterfinals	Semifinals	Final	
Athlete	Event	Opposition Score	Opposition Score	Opposition Score	Opposition Score	Opposition Score	Opposition Score	Opposition Score	Rank
Francis Hunter	Singles	Grahn (FIN); W 6–3, 6–0, 6–2	Hortal (ARG); W 6–3, 6–3, 6–1	Washer (BEL); L 6–2, 6–1, 2–6, 1–6, 4–6	Did not advance				
Vincent Richards	Singles	Bye	de Laveleye (BEL); W 6–2, 6–4, 6–0	Sleem (IND); W 8–6, 2–6, 6–4, 4–6, 6–2	Alonso (ESP); W 7–5, 10–8, 2–6, 6–3	Lacoste (FRA); W 8–6, 4–6, 1–6, 6–2, 6–3	de Morpurgo (ITA); W 6–3, 3–6, 6–1, 6–4	Cochet (FRA); W 6–4, 6–4, 5–7, 4–6, 6–2	1st place, gold medalist(s)
Watson Washburn	Singles	Serventi (ITA); W 6–4, 6–3, 6–4	Lupu (ROU); W 6–2, 6–3, 6–4	van Lennep (NED); W 2–6, 6–1, 6–1, 6–2	Jacob (IND); L 1–6, 4–6, 10–8, 2–6	Did not advance			
R. Norris Williams	Singles	Bye	Hadj (IND); W 6–0, 6–2, 6–1	Macenauer (TCH); W 6–2, 4–6, 3–6, 6–2, 6–1	von Kehrling (HUN); W 6–4, 3–6, 6–3, 4–6, 6–3	Cochet (FRA); L 7–5, 3–6, 2–6, 4–6	Did not advance		
Francis Hunter; Vincent Richards	Doubles	—N/a	Bye	Willard / Bayley (AUS); W 6–1, 6–2, 6–2	Žemla / Koželuh (TCH); W 6–2, 6–3, 6–4	J. Alonso / M. Alonso (ESP); W 6–4, 6–4, 6–3	Lacoste / Borotra (FRA); W 6–2, 6–3, 0–6, 5–7, 6–3	Brugnon / Cochet (FRA); W 4–6, 6–2, 6–3, 2–6, 6–3	1st place, gold medalist(s)
Watson Washburn; R. Norris Williams	Doubles	—N/a	Kirchmayr / Göncz (HUN); W 6–1, 6–0, 6–0	Rohrer / Gottlieb (TCH); W 6–3, 6–2, 6–1	Tegner / Ulrich (DEN); W 6–4, 6–4, 12–10	Condon / Richardson (RSA); L 6–4, 9–11, 6–4, 4–6, 4–6	Did not advance		

Women

Athlete	Event	Round of 64	Round of 32	Round of 16	Quarterfinals	Semifinals	Final	
Athlete	Event	Opposition Score	Opposition Score	Opposition Score	Opposition Score	Opposition Score	Opposition Score	Rank
Eleanor Goss	Singles	Bye	Bye	Vlasto (FRA); L 3–6, 6–2, 4–6	Did not advance			
Marion Jessup	Singles	Bye	Bye	Torras (ESP); W 6–2, 6–0	McKane (GBR); L 2–6, 0–6	Did not advance		
Lillian Scharman	Singles	Bye	González-Álvarez (ESP); L 2–6, 2–6	Did not advance				
Helen Wills Moody	Singles	Bye	Bye	Satterthwaite (GBR); W 6–1, 6–1	Mallory (NOR); W 6–2, 6–3	Golding (FRA); W 6–2, 6–1	Vlasto (FRA); W 6–2, 6–2	1st place, gold medalist(s)
Eleanor Goss; Marion Jessup	Doubles	—N/a	Covell / McKane (GBR); L 1–6, 2–6	Did not advance				
Hazel Wightman; Helen Wills Moody	Doubles	—N/a	Bye	Bye	Bye	Shepherd-Barron / Colyer (GBR); W 6–3, 1–6, 7–5	Covell / McKane (GBR); W 7–5, 8–6	1st place, gold medalist(s)

Mixed

Athlete	Event	Round of 32	Round of 16	Quarterfinals	Semifinals	Final	
Athlete	Event	Opposition Score	Opposition Score	Opposition Score	Opposition Score	Opposition Score	Rank
Marion Jessup; Vincent Richards	Doubles	Billout / Borotra (FRA); W 6–3, 6–1	Mallory / Nielsen (NOR); W 6–3, 6–2	González-Álvarez / Flaquer (ESP); W 6–3, 6–0	Bouman / Timmer (NED); W 6–3, 6–0	Wightman / Williams (USA); L 2–6, 3–6	2nd place, silver medalist(s)
Hazel Wightman; R. Norris Williams	Doubles	Bye	Valaoritou-Skaramaga / Zerlentis (GRE); W 6–2, 6–1	Fick / Müller (SWE); W 8–6, 6–2	McKane / Gilbert (GBR); W 2–6, 8–6, 6–1	Jessup / Richards (USA); W 6–2, 6–3	1st place, gold medalist(s)

== Water polo ==
In its third Olympic water polo appearance, the United States took the bronze medal.

Roster

- Arthur Austin
- Elmer Collett
- Jam Handy
- Oliver Horn
- Fred Lauer
- George Mitchell
- John Norton
- Wally O'Connor
- George Schroth
- Herb Vollmer
- Johnny Weissmuller

First round

France	3–1	United States	Piscine des Tourelles

Silver medal semifinals

United States	4–2	Netherlands	Piscine des Tourelles

Silver medal final

United States	1–2	Belgium	Piscine des Tourelles

Bronze medal quarterfinals
- Bye
Bronze medal semifinals

United States	4–2	Netherlands	Piscine des Tourelles

Bronze medal final

Sweden	2–3	United States	Piscine des Tourelles

== Wrestling ==
=== Freestyle wrestling ===
Men's

Athlete	Event	Round of 32	Round of 16	Quarterfinal	Semifinal	Final	
Athlete	Event	Opposition Result	Opposition Result	Opposition Result	Opposition Result	Opposition Result	Rank
Roger Flanders	Heavyweight	—N/a	Bye	Nilsson (SWE); W	Did not advance		
Bryant Hines	Bantamweight	—N/a	Bye	Dillen (BEL); W	Pihlajamäki (FIN); L Silver medal semifinal Bye Bronze medal semifinal Larsson (SWE); W	Silver medal final Mäkinen (FIN); L Bronze medal final Ducayla (FRA); W	3rd place, bronze medalist(s)
William Johnson	Welterweight	—N/a	Bye	Gehri (SUI); L	Silver medal semifinal Fichu (FRA); W Bronze medal semifinal Davis (GBR); W	Silver medal final Leino (FIN); L Bronze medal final Müller (SUI); L	4
Guy Lookabough	Welterweight	—N/a	Müller (SUI); W	Davis (GBR); W	Stockton (CAN); W Silver medal semifinal Leino (FIN); L	Gehri (SUI); L	Did not advance
Charles MacWilliam	Bantamweight	—N/a	Larsson (SWE); L	Did not advance			
Perry Martter	Lightweight	—N/a	Praks (EST); L	Did not advance			
Chester Newton	Featherweight	Bye	Hansson (SWE); W	Torgensen (DEN); W	Huupponen (FIN); W Silver medal semifinal Koolmann (EST); W	Reed (USA); L Silver medal final Naito (JPN); W	2nd place, silver medalist(s)
Robin Reed	Featherweight	Bye	Koolmann (EST); W	Naito (JPN); W	Chilcott (CAN); W	Newton (USA); W	1st place, gold medalist(s)
Herschel Smith	Middleweight	—N/a	Nielsen (DEN); W	Pekkala (FIN); L	Did not advance		
John Spellman	Light heavyweight	—N/a	Wilson (GBR); W	Rumple (CAN); W	Westergren (SWE); W	Svensson (SWE); W	1st place, gold medalist(s)
Harry Steel	Heavyweight	—N/a	Bye	MacDonald (GBR); W	Wernli (SUI); W	Nilsson (SWE); W	1st place, gold medalist(s)
Charles Strack	Light heavyweight	—N/a	Courant (SUI); L	Did not advance			
Russell Vis	Lightweight	—N/a	Montgomery (CAN); W	Pouvroux (FRA); W	Haavisto (FIN); W	Wikström (FIN); W	1st place, gold medalist(s)
Walter Wright	Middleweight	—N/a	Pekkala (FIN); L	Did not advance			
