= Boxing at the 1924 Summer Olympics – Featherweight =

Boxing competitions

Featherweight boxing at the Games of the VIII Olympiad
- Venue: Vélodrome d'hiver
- Dates: 15–20 July 1924
- Competitors: 24 from 17 nations

Medalists
1st place, gold medalist(s)		Jackie Fields; United States
2nd place, silver medalist(s)		Joseph Salas; United States
3rd place, bronze medalist(s)		Pedro Quartucci; Argentina

The men's featherweight event was part of the boxing programme at the 1924 Summer Olympics. The weight class was the third-lightest contested, and allowed boxers of up to 126 pounds (57.2 kilograms). The competition was held from 15 to 20 July 1924. 24 boxers from 17 nations competed.

== Results ==
Round of 32; 15 July
Jackie Fields (USA)	PTS
Mossy Doyle (IRL)	L
Carlos Abarca (CHI)	PTS
Gustaf Bergman (SWE)	L
Pedro Quartucci (ARG)	PTS
Henri Stuckemann (FRA)	L
Arthur Beavis (GBR)	KO3
Jean Flammang (LUX)	L
Marcel Depont (FRA)	PTS
Ernest Eustice (RSA)	L
Raymond Devergnies (BEL)	PTS
Luis Bru (ESP)	L
Livio Francecchini (ITA)	PTS
Mickey MacGowan (CAN)	L
Joseph Salas (USA)	PTS
Agnew Burlie (CAN)	L

Round of 16; 16 July
Olaf Hansen (NOR)	L
Jackie Fields (USA)	PTS
Emilio Bautista (ESP)	L
Carlos Abarca (CHI)	PTS
Pedro Quartucci (ARG)	PTS
Arthur Beavis (GBR)	L
Marcel Depont (FRA)	PTS
Manuel Esmoris (URU)	L
Harry Dingley (GBR)	PTS
Karel Tuns (BEL)	L
Raymond Devergnies (BEL)	PTS
Livio Francecchini (ITA)	L
Joseph Salas (USA)	PTS
Herman Levij (NED)	L
Bruno Petrarca (ITA)	PTS
Jacques Sauthier (SUI)	L

Quarterfinals; 18 July
Jackie Fields (USA)	PTS
Carlos Abarca (CHI)	L
Pedro Quartucci (ARG)	PTS
Marcel Depont (FRA)	L
Harry Dingley (GBR)	L
Raymond Devergnies (BEL)	PTS
Joseph Salas (USA)	W
Bruno Petrarca (ITA)	DQ2

Semifinals; 19 July
Jackie Fields (USA)	PTS
Pedro Quartucci (ARG)	L
Raymond Devergnies (BEL)	L
Joseph Salas (USA)	PTS

Final; 20 July
Jackie Fields (USA)	PTS
Joseph Salas (USA)	L
Bronze medal bout
Pedro Quartucci (ARG)	PTS
Raymond Devergnies (BEL)	L

== Sources ==
- official report
- Wudarski, Pawel (1999). "Wyniki Igrzysk Olimpijskich" (in Polish).
