= Karel Tuns =

Belgian boxer

Karel Tuns (born 16 January 1906, date of death unknown) was a Belgian boxer who competed in the 1924 Summer Olympics.

In 1924 he was eliminated in the second round of the featherweight class after losing his fight to Harry Dingley.
