= Ernest Eustice =

South African boxer (1904–1958)

- Born: 30 November 1904; Johannesburg
- Died: 30 March 1958 (aged 53); Johannesburg

Ernest Jenkin Eustice (30 November 1904 – 30 March 1958) was a South African boxer who competed in the 1924 Summer Olympics. Eustice was born and died in Johannesburg. In 1924, Eustice was eliminated in the first round of the featherweight class after losing his fight to Marcel Depont of France.
