= Manuel Esmoris =

Uruguayan boxer

Manuel Esmoris (born 11 July 1907, date of death unknown) was a Uruguayan boxer who competed in the 1924 Summer Olympics. In 1924 he was eliminated in the second round of the featherweight class after losing his fight to Marcel Depont.
