= Henri Stuckemann =

French boxer

Henri Stuckemann (28 August 1906 – 8 November 1970) was a French boxer who competed in the 1924 Summer Olympics. In 1924 he was eliminated in the first round of the featherweight class after losing his fight to the upcoming bronze medalist Pedro Quartucci.
