= Sam Dalrymple =

Sam Dalrymple may refer to:

- Sam Dalrymple (soccer)
- Sam Dalrymple (historian)
