= Arthur Beavis =

British boxer

Personal information
- Nationality: British
- Born: March 1905; Reading, England
- Died: 13 March 1978; Camden, England

Sport
- Sport: Boxing

Arthur Henry Beavis (March 1905 – 13 March 1978) was a British boxer. He competed in the men's featherweight event at the 1924 Summer Olympics. At the 1924 Summer Olympics, he defeated Jean Flammang of Luxembourg, before losing to Pedro Quartucci of Argentina.

Beavis won the 1924 and 1925 Amateur Boxing Association British featherweight title, when boxing out of the Polytechnic Boxing Club.
