= Luis Bru =

Spanish boxer

Luis Bru Pérez (born 19 October 1907 in Barcelona, date of death unknown) was a Spanish boxer who competed in the 1924 Summer Olympics. In 1924 he was eliminated in the first round of the featherweight class after losing his fight to Livio Francecchini.
