= James Mulholland =

James Mulholland may refer to:

- Jakes Mulholland, former American soccer defender
- James Mulholland, member of the British band The KBC
- James Mulholland (Latter Day Saints), co-author of the Latter Day Saints document History of the Church
- James Allan Mulholland, Pioneer Corps officer and Member of the Order of the British Empire
- James Mulholland, Representative, British Council, Sierra Leone, 1978 and Officer of the Order of the British Empire
- Jimmy Mulholland (born 1938), Scottish footballer
