= Fritz Hagmann =

Swiss freestyle wrestler (1901–1974)

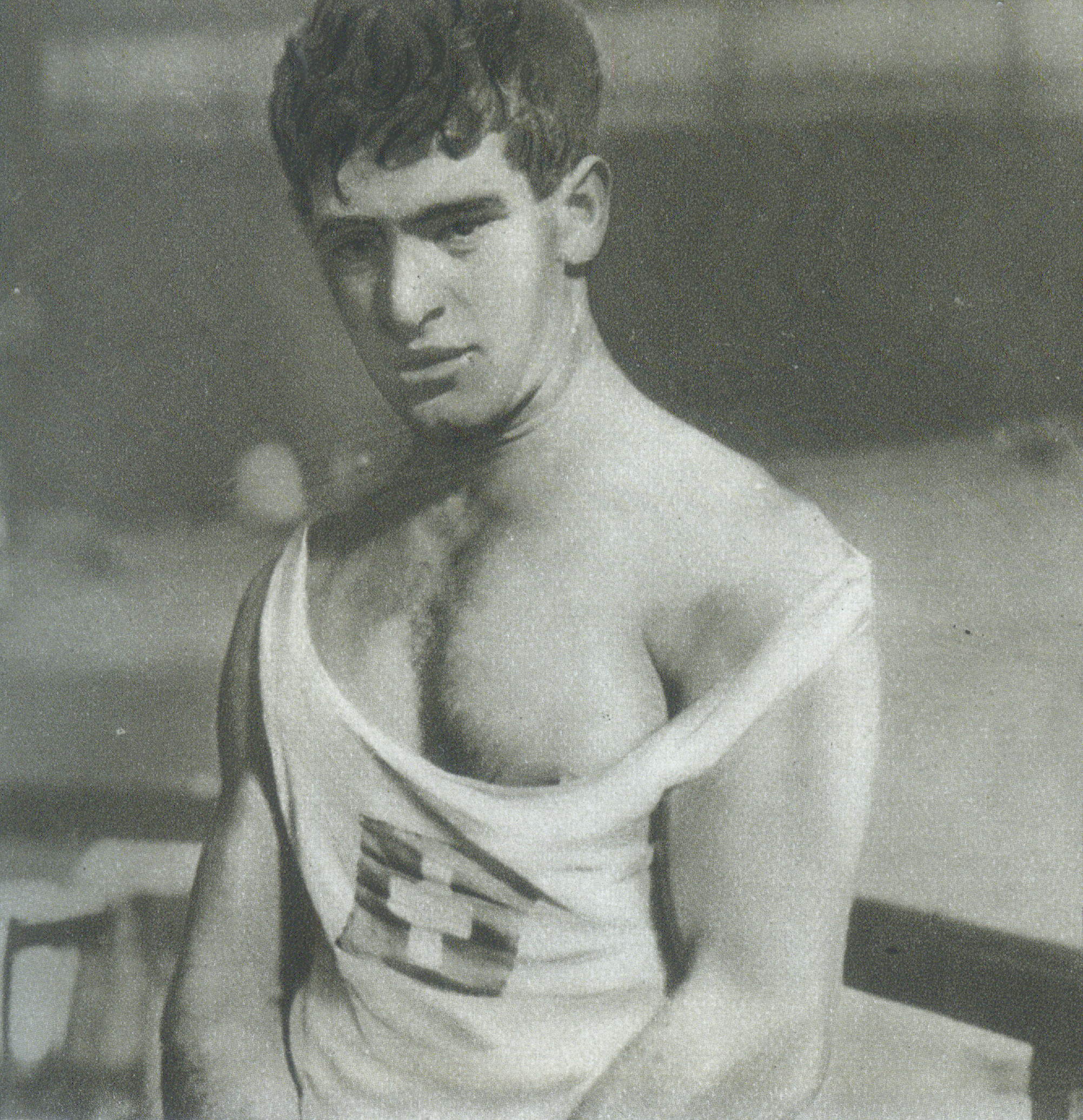
- Born: 28 March 1901
- Died: 14 December 1974 (aged 73)
Medal record
Men's freestyle wrestling
Representing Switzerland
Olympic Games
Gold medal – first place	1924 Paris	Middleweight

Fritz Hagmann (28 March 1901 – 14 December 1974) was a Swiss freestyle wrestler and Olympic champion. He won a gold medal at the 1924 Summer Olympics in Paris.

In addition to his freestyle wrestling career, Hagman was a Schwinger and a member of the Schwingklub Winterthur. At a competition in 1927, he made a draw in the final round against fellow Olympian freestyle wrestler Ernst Kyburz.
