= Raymond Durr =

French wrestler

- Born: 1901

Raymond Durr (born 1901, date of death unknown) was a French wrestler. He competed in the freestyle middleweight event at the 1924 Summer Olympics.
