= Johan Penttilä =

Finnish wrestler (1891–1967)

- Born: 2 March 1891; Nurmo, Vaasa Province, Grand Duchy of Finland
- Died: 23 February 1967 (aged 75); Worcester, Massachusetts, United States

Johan Penttilä (2 March 1891 – 23 February 1967) was a Finnish wrestler. He competed in the freestyle middleweight event at the 1924 Summer Olympics.
