= Jean Flammang =

Luxembourgish boxer

Jean Flammang (9 March 1905 in Esch-sur-Alzette – 1 October 1990) was a Luxembourgish boxer who competed in the 1924 Summer Olympics. In 1924 he was eliminated in the first round of the featherweight class after losing his fight to Arthur Beavis.
