= Louis Wilhelme =

French long and triple jumper

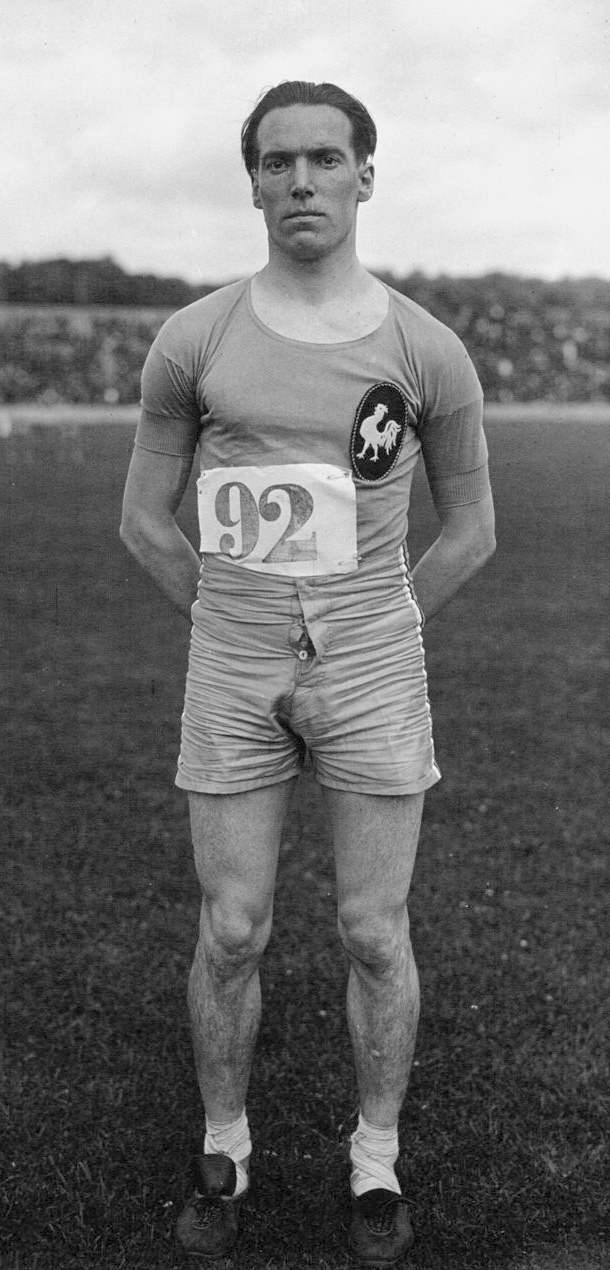
- Louis Wilhelme in 1923

Personal information
- Born: 9 June 1900 Nantes, France
- Died: 20 September 1966 (aged 66) Orléans, France

Sport
- Sport: Athletics
- Events: Long jump, triple jump
- Club: UAI Paris

Achievements and titles
- Personal bests: LJ – 7.12 m (1924); TJ – 13.65 m (1922)

Louis Eugène Edmond Wilhelme (9 June 1900 – 20 September 1966) was a French track and field athlete who competed in the 1924 Summer Olympics. He finished fifth in the long jump and failed to reach the triple jump final.
