= Bruno Petrarca =

Italian boxer

Bruno Petrarca (26 December 1906 – 3 July 1977) was an Italian boxer who competed in the 1924 Summer Olympics. In 1924 he was eliminated in the quarter-finals of the featherweight class after losing his fight to the upcoming silver medalist Joseph Salas.
