= John O'Connor (triple jumper) =

Irish triple jumper

Personal information
- Nationality: Irish
- Born: 1 August 1894 Killarney, Ireland
- Died: 10 October 1977 (aged 83) Dublin, Ireland

Sport
- Sport: Athletics
- Event: Triple jump

John O'Connor (1 August 1894 – 10 October 1977), also known as John Connor, was an Irish athlete and policeman. O'Connor would join the Royal Irish Constabulary and later the Royal Ulster Constabulary after the former's disbandment. Representing Ireland, he competed at the 1924 Summer Olympics in the men's triple jump but did not advance past the qualifying stages.

Domestically, he represented the sports club North Belfast Harriers. At the Irish National Championships he won five titles in the long jump, triple jump, and standing high jump. O'Connor retired from the police force in 1951 as the head constable and would live in Dublin until his death.

== Biography ==
John O'Connor was born on 1 August 1894 in Killarney, Ireland. On 16 December 1913 he joined the Royal Irish Constabulary, the police force in Ireland, and would serve in Dublin and County Clare until its disbandment in 1922. After that, he would join the Royal Ulster Constabulary instead.

Domestically, he represented the sports club North Belfast Harriers. At the time he resided in Belfast, he would compete for Ireland at the 1924 Summer Olympics in Paris, France, for Ireland's first Olympic Games participation. There, he competed in the men's triple jump. In the qualifying round on 12 July, he recorded a distance of 13.990 metres and was placed fifth out of the nine competitors in that round; he did not qualify for the finals.

In his domestic sports career, he competed in the long jump, triple jump, and standing high jump. At the Irish Athletics Championships, he won five titles in each event, with his best distances in the long jump and triple jump being 6.97 metres and 14.45 metres, respectively. O'Connor retired from the police force in 1951 as the head constable. He lived in Dublin until his death on 10 October 1977 at the age of 83. He was buried at Rooske Cemetery.
