= Irving Davis =

American soccer player

Personal information
- Full name: Cyril Irving Davis
- Date of birth: December 12, 1896
- Place of birth: Stourport-on-Severn, England
- Date of death: June 27, 1958 (aged 61)
- Position: Full back

Senior career*
Years	Team	Apps	(Gls)
1924–1926	Philadelphia Field Club	76	(3)
- Fairhill F.C.

International career
1924–1925	United States	5	(0)
- * Club domestic league appearances and goals

Cyril Irving Davis (December 12, 1896 – June 27, 1958) was an American soccer full back who played professionally with Philadelphia Field Club in the American Soccer League (ASL) from 1924 to 1926. He was born in Stourport-on-Severn, England. Davis was a member of the U.S. soccer team at the 1924 Summer Olympics. He went on to earn five caps with the U.S. national team in 1924 and 1925. His first game with the U.S. national team came in the U.S. victory over Estonia at the 1924 Olympics. His last game came on June 27, 1926, a 1–0 loss to Canada. He later went on to play for Fairhill F.C.
