= Athletics at the 1924 Summer Olympics – Men's triple jump =

Men's triple jump at the Games of the VIII Olympiad
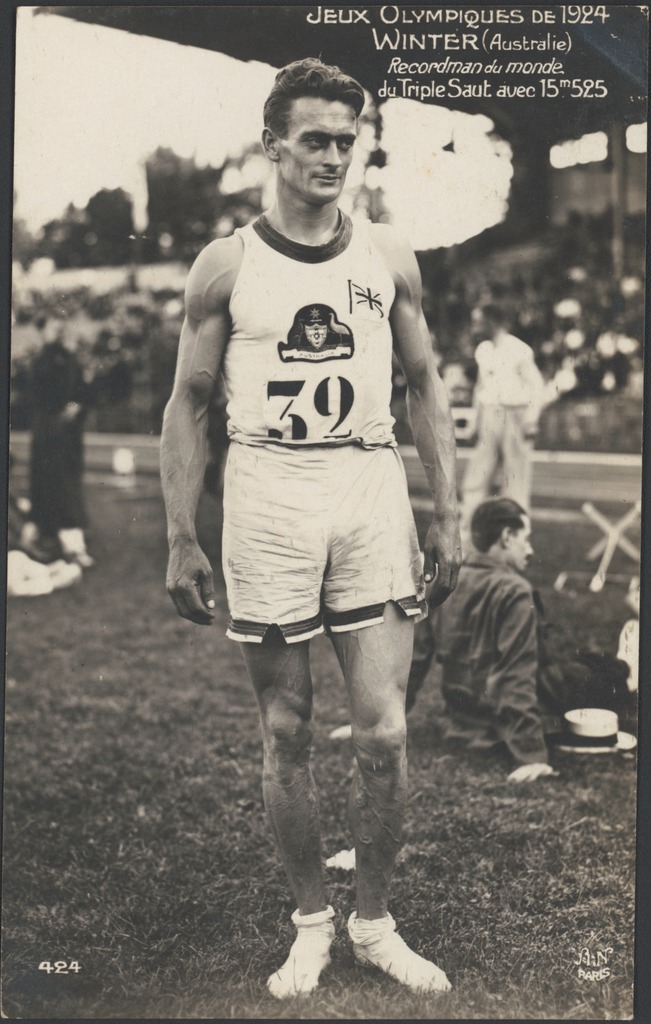
- Australian postcard commemorating Nick Winter's world record jump
- Venue: Stade Olympique Yves-du-Manoir
- Date: July 12, 1924
- Competitors: 20 from 12 nations
- Winning distance: 15.525 WR

Medalists
1st place, gold medalist(s)		Nick Winter; Australia
2nd place, silver medalist(s)		Luis Brunetto; Argentina
3rd place, bronze medalist(s)		Vilho Tuulos; Finland

The men's triple jump event was part of the track and field athletics programme at the 1924 Summer Olympics. The competition was held on Saturday, July 12, 1924. Twenty triple jumpers from twelve nations competed. The maximum number of athletes per nation was 4. The event was won by Nick Winter of Australia, the nation winning gold in its debut in the event. Argentina also medaled in its first triple jump appearance, with Luis Brunetto taking silver. Defending champion Vilho Tuulos of Finland took bronze, the fourth man to win a second medal in the event.

== Background ==
This was the seventh appearance of the event, which is one of 12 athletics events to have been held at every Summer Olympics. Returning finalists from the 1920 Games were gold medalist Vilho Tuulos of Finland and silver medalist Folke Jansson and fourth-place finisher Ivar Sahlin of Sweden. Tuulos was favored to repeat, having recently jumped just short of the world record (15.48 metres, the second-best ever after the world record of 15.52).

Argentina, Australia, Bulgaria, Ireland, Japan, and the Netherlands each made their first appearance in the event. The United States competed for the seventh time, having competed at each of the Games so far.

== Competition format ==
The competition was described as two rounds at the time, but was more similar to the modern divided final. All athletes received three jumps initially. The top six after that received an additional three jumps to improve their distance, but the initial jumps would still count if no improvement was made.

== Records ==
These were the standing world and Olympic records (in metres) prior to the 1924 Summer Olympics.

World record	Dan Ahearn (GBR)	15.52	New York, United States	30 May 1911
Olympic record	Tim Ahearne (GBR)	14.92	London, United Kingdom of Great Britain and Ireland	25 July 1908

In the qualification Luis Brunetto set a new Olympic record with 15.425 metres. In the final Nick Winter set a new world record with 15.525 metres.

== Schedule ==
Date	Time	Round
Saturday, 12 July 1924	14:00	Qualifying; Final

== Results ==
The best six triple jumpers, both groups counted together, qualified for the final. The jumping order and the jumping series are not available.

Rank	Athlete	Nation	1	2	3	4	5	6	Distance	Notes
1st place, gold medalist(s)	Nick Winter	Australia	X	15.180	X	15.130	X	15.525 WR	15.525	WR
2nd place, silver medalist(s)	Luis Brunetto	Argentina	15.425 OR	14.800	15.200	14.780	?	?	15.425	
3rd place, bronze medalist(s)	Vilho Tuulos	Finland	14.840			15.370			15.370	
4	Väinö Rainio	Finland	14.940			15.010			15.010	
5	Folke Jansson	Sweden	14.970			Did not improve			14.970	
6	Mikio Oda	Japan	14.350			Did not improve			14.350	
7	Earle Wilson	United States	14.235			Did not advance			14.235	
8	Ivar Sahlin	Sweden	14.160			Did not advance			14.160	
9	Merwin Graham	United States	14.000			Did not advance			14.000	
10	John O'Connor	Ireland	13.990			Did not advance			13.990	
11	Willem Peters	Netherlands	13.860			Did not advance			13.860	
12	John Odde	Great Britain	13.400			Did not advance			13.400	
13	Jack Higginson	Great Britain	13.340			Did not advance			13.340	
14	Philip MacDonald	Canada	13.330			Did not advance			13.330	
15	Harold Langley	Great Britain	12.740			Did not advance			12.740	
16	Ross Sheppard	Canada	12.720			Did not advance			12.720	
17	Louis Wilhelme	France	12.660			Did not advance			12.660	
18	Kiril Petrunov	Bulgaria	12.015			Did not advance			12.015	
—	DeHart Hubbard	United States	X	X	X	Did not advance			No mark	
—	André Clayeux	France	X	X	X	Did not advance			No mark	

There were 17 nonstarters.
