= Jacques Sauthier =

Swiss boxer

Personal information
- Nationality: Swiss
- Born: 1905
- Died: 19 April 1985 (aged 79–80)

Sport
- Sport: Boxing

Jacques Sauthier (1905 – 19 April 1985) was a Swiss boxer. He competed in the men's featherweight event at the 1924 Summer Olympics.
