= Wrestling at the 1924 Summer Olympics – Men's freestyle bantamweight =

1924 freestyle wrestling event

Men's bantamweight freestyle wrestling at the Games of the VIII Olympiad
- Venue: Vélodrome d'Hiver
- Dates: July 11–14, 1924
- Competitors: 12 from 8 nations

Medalists
1st place, gold medalist(s)		Kustaa Pihlajamäki	Finland
2nd place, silver medalist(s)		Kaarlo Mäkinen	Finland
3rd place, bronze medalist(s)		Bryan Hines	United States

The men's freestyle bantamweight was a freestyle wrestling event held as part of the Wrestling at the 1924 Summer Olympics programme. It was the third appearance of the event. Bantamweight was the lightest category, including wrestlers weighing up to 56 kilograms.

== Results ==
Source: Official results; Wudarski

=== Gold medal round ===
Round of 16
Harry Darby (GBR)	W
Piero Tordera (ITA)	L
Axel Larsson (SWE)	W
Charles MacWilliam (USA)	L
Kaarlo Mäkinen (FIN)	W
Gaston Ducayla (FRA)	L
Bert Sansum (GBR)	W
James Trifunov (CAN)	L

Quarterfinals
Harry Darby (GBR)	L
Kustaa Pihlajamäki (FIN)	W
Bryant Hines (USA)	W
Jacques Dillen (BEL)	L
Jules Bouquet (FRA)	L
Axel Larsson (SWE)	W
Kaarlo Mäkinen (FIN)	W
Bert Sansum (GBR)	L

Semifinals
Kustaa Pihlajamäki (FIN)	W
Bryant Hines (USA)	L
Axel Larsson (SWE)	L
Kaarlo Mäkinen (FIN)	W

Final
Kustaa Pihlajamäki (FIN)	W
Kaarlo Mäkinen (FIN)	L

=== Silver medal round ===
Semifinals		Final
Kaarlo Mäkinen (FIN)	W
Harry Darby (GBR)	L	Kaarlo Mäkinen (FIN)	W
		Bryant Hines (USA)	L

=== Bronze medal round ===
Semifinals		Final
Bryant Hines (USA)	W
Axel Larsson (SWE)	L	Bryant Hines (USA)	W
Gaston Ducayla (FRA)	W	Gaston Ducayla (FRA)	L
Bert Sansum (GBR)	L
