= Livio Francecchini =

Italian boxer

Livio Franceschini (born 27 November 1905, date of death unknown) was an Italian boxer who competed in the 1924 Summer Olympics. In 1924 he was eliminated in the second round of the featherweight class after losing his fight to Raymond Devergnies.
