= Harry Darby (wrestler) =

British wrestler

- Born: 22 September 1902
- Died: 17 September 1971 (aged 68)

Harry Darby (22 September 1902 – 17 September 1971) was a British wrestler. He competed in the freestyle bantamweight event at the 1924 Summer Olympics. Darby was also the British bantamweight champion in 1925.

Darby won the British Wrestling Championships in 1925.
