= Herman Levij =

Dutch boxer

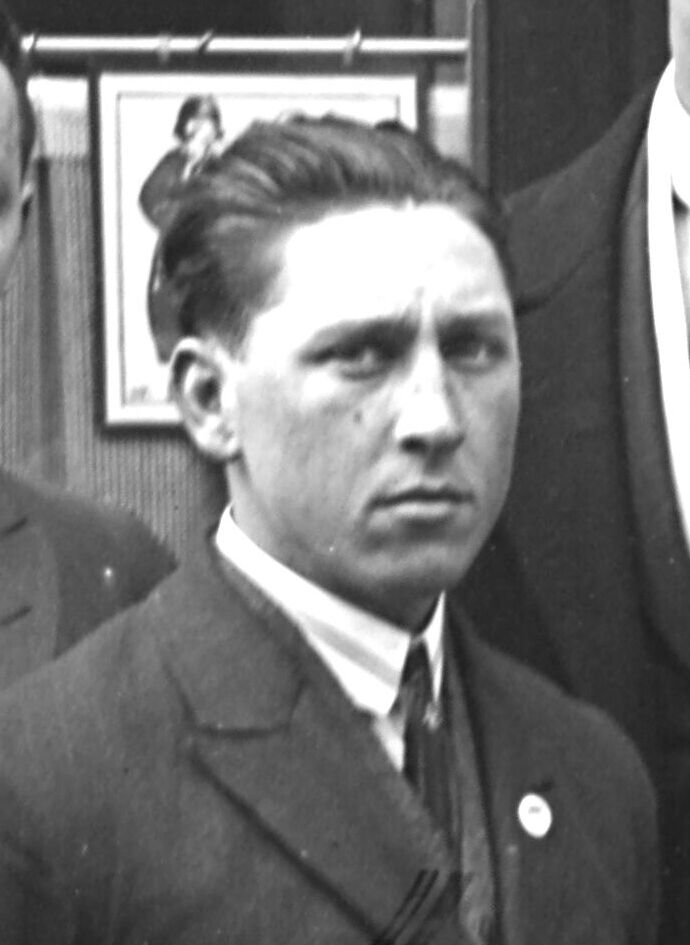
Herman Levij in 1924

Either Herman Albertus "Herman" Levij (15 April 1904, Rotterdam – 12 December 1983) or Heinz Levy (29 April 1904, Hannover - 31 March 1944 Auschwitz) was a Dutch boxer who competed in the 1924 Summer Olympics. In 1924 he was eliminated in the second round of the featherweight class after losing his fight to the upcoming silver medalist Joseph Salas.
