= Wrestling at the 1924 Summer Olympics – Men's freestyle middleweight =

Men's middleweight freestyle wrestling at the Games of the VIII Olympiad
- Venue: Vélodrome d'Hiver
- Dates: July 11–14, 1924
- Competitors: 14 from 9 nations

Medalists
1st place, gold medalist(s)		Fritz Hagmann	Switzerland
2nd place, silver medalist(s)		Pierre Ollivier	Belgium
3rd place, bronze medalist(s)		Vilho Pekkala	Finland

The men's freestyle middleweight was a freestyle wrestling event held as part of the Wrestling at the 1924 Summer Olympics programme. It was the third appearance of the event. Middleweight was the third-heaviest category, including wrestlers weighing from 72 to 79 kilograms.

== Results ==
Source: Official results; Wudarski

=== Gold medal round ===
Round of 16
Fritz Hagemann (SUI)	W
John Christoffersen (DEN)	L
Johan Penttilä (FIN)	W
Raymond Durr (FRA)	L
Pierre Ollivier (BEL)	W
Enrico Bonassin (ITA)	L
Ernst Tognetti (SUI)	W
Bernard Rowe (GBR)	L
Vilho Pekkala (FIN)	W
Walter Wright (USA)	L
Herschel Smith (USA)	W
Svend Nielsen (DEN)	L

Quarterfinals
Noel Rhys (GBR)	W
Carl Nilsson (SWE)	L
Fritz Hagemann (SUI)	W
Johan Penttilä (FIN)	L
Pierre Ollivier (BEL)	W
Ernst Tognetti (SUI)	L
Vilho Pekkala (FIN)	W
Herschel Smith (USA)	L

Semifinals
Noel Rhys (GBR)	L
Fritz Hagemann (SUI)	W
Pierre Ollivier (BEL)	W
Vilho Pekkala (FIN)	L

Final
Fritz Hagemann (SUI)	W
Pierre Ollivier (BEL)	L

=== Silver medal round ===
Semifinals		Final
Pierre Ollivier (BEL)	W
Noel Rhys (GBR)	L	Pierre Ollivier (BEL)	W
Johan Penttilä (FIN)	W	Johan Penttilä (FIN)	L
John Christoffersen (DEN)	L

=== Bronze medal round ===
Semifinals		Final
Vilho Pekkala (FIN)	W
Enrico Bonassin (ITA)	L	Vilho Pekkala (FIN)	W
Johan Penttilä (FIN)	W	Johan Penttilä (FIN)	L
Ernst Tognetti (SUI)	L
