= Ernst Tognetti =

Swiss wrestler

Emile Tognetti

Emile Tognetti was a Swiss wrestler. He competed in the freestyle middleweight event at the 1924 Summer Olympics.
