= Mickey MacGowan =

Canadian boxer (1900–1977)

Personal information
- Born: 19 June 1900; Montreal, Quebec, Canada
- Died: 29 December 1977 (aged 77); Montreal, Quebec, Canada

Sport
- Sport: Boxing

Mickey MacGowan (19 June 1900 – 29 December 1977) was a Canadian boxer. He competed in the men's featherweight event at the 1924 Summer Olympics.
