= Earle Wilson =

American triple jumper

Personal information
- Nationality: American
- Born: February 4, 1901
- Died: May 23, 1989 (aged 88)

Sport
- Sport: Athletics
- Event: Triple jump

Earle Wilson (February 4, 1901 – May 23, 1989) was an American athlete. He competed in the men's triple jump at the 1924 Summer Olympics.
