= Lester Smith (swimmer) =

American swimmer

Personal information
- Full name: Lester Edward Smith
- National team: United States
- Born: April 14, 1902 San Francisco, California, U.S.
- Died: September 4, 1957 (aged 55) San Francisco, California, U.S.
- Height: 5 ft 10 in (1.78 m)

Sport
- Sport: Swimming
- Strokes: Freestyle
- Club: Olympic Club

Lester Edward Smith (April 14, 1902 – September 4, 1957) was an American competition swimmer who represented the United States at the 1924 Summer Olympics in Paris. Smith competed in the men's 400-meter freestyle, advanced to the semifinals, and recorded a time of 5:37.6.
