= Jackie Fields =

American boxer (1908–1987)

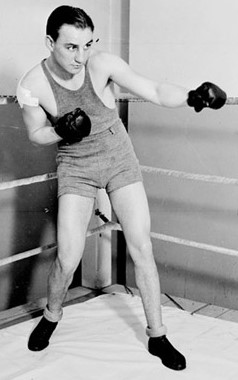

Personal information
- Born: Jacob Finkelstein; February 9, 1908 Chicago, Illinois, U.S.
- Died: June 3, 1987 (aged 79) Las Vegas, Nevada, U.S.
- Height: 5 ft 7 1/2 in (171 cm)
- Weight: Welterweight

Boxing career
- Reach: 69 in (175 cm)
- Stance: Orthodox

Boxing record
- Total fights: 84
- Wins: 72
- Win by KO: 31
- Losses: 9
- Draws: 2
- No contests: 1
Medal record
Men's boxing
Representing the United States
Olympic Games
Gold medal – first place	1924 Paris	Featherweight

Jackie Fields (Jacob Finkelstein, February 9, 1908 – June 3, 1987) was an American professional boxer who won the Undisputed Welterweight Championship twice. Statistical boxing website BoxRec lists Fields as the #19 ranked welterweight of all-time. Fields was elected to the United Savings-Helms Hall of Boxing Fame in 1972, the International Jewish Sports Hall of Fame in 1979, the World Boxing Hall of Fame in 1987, and the International Boxing Hall of Fame in 2004.

== Early life and career ==
Jackie Fields, who was Jewish, was born Jacob Finkelstein on Maxwell Street, in Chicago, Illinois, on February 9, 1908. His father was a Jewish Russian immigrant who worked as a butcher. His younger brother was Sam Fields, who was a film editor. In 1921, when he was 14 years old, he and his family moved to Los Angeles, California. He attended Lincoln High School, but dropped out.

Some of his initial boxing instruction came from the legendary Black boxing trainer and former lightweight boxer Jack Blackburn, who would later train Joe Louis. When his family moved to Los Angeles in 1921, Fields continued boxing at Jack Dempsey's Gym. He boxed as an exceptional amateur for the Los Angeles Sporting Club, under the instruction of George Blake, a master trainer who recognized Jackie's potential as early as the age of thirteen. An exceptional boxer in Blake's stable, future world flyweight champion Fidel LaBarba, sparred with the young Fields after he arrived in Los Angeles and would spar with him on other occasions to improve his technique and speed.

As a young fighter, Fields was told by promoters that his birth name presented "the wrong image" because Jews weren't considered tough, physical guys. In looking for a suitable ring name, Finkelstein selected "Fields" after Chicago businessman and philanthropist Marshall Field; "Jackie" was selected as an Americanized form of his first name, Jacob.

== Amateur career ==
Over the course of Field's amateur career, he participated in 54 fights, winning 51 of them. Fields won a gold medal in featherweight boxing at the age of only 16 in the 1924 Summer Olympics in Paris, becoming the youngest boxer to ever receive such an honor.

=== Olympic results (1924) ===
- Defeated Mossy Doyle (Ireland) PTS
- Defeated Olaf Hansen (Norway) PTS
- Defeated Carlos Abarca (Chile) PTS
- Defeated Pedro Quartucci (Argentina) PTS
- Defeated Joseph Salas (USA) PTS

== Professional career ==
=== Early career loss to Jimmy McLarnin, 1925 ===
Intrigued by a $5000 purse, but acting against the better judgement of skilled matchmakers, Fields took on the far more experienced Jimmy McLarnin, on November 12, 1925. With only six fights and nine months of professional boxing to his credit, Fields lost badly in a second-round knockout at Olympic Auditorium in Los Angeles. McLarnin floored him four times in the brief match, with Fields suffering a broken jaw in the humiliating defeat. Dubbing him the "future lightweight champion", the Los Angeles Times recognized the mastery of McLarnin, who carefully studied Fields's style, letting him take the lead in the first, before knocking him down three times in the second with successive overhand rights. Never having been down before, Fields unwisely rose immediately from his first knockdown, only to be knocked to the canvas again. In his fourth knockdown, he remained on the canvas for the full count. Learning from the experience, and listening more carefully to his handlers, Fields never lost a match by knockout again.

Fields suffered a rare early career loss to Jewish boxer, and former world featherweight champion Louis "Kid" Kaplan on June 15, 1927, in a ten round points decision at New York's Polo Grounds. Kaplan's two handed attack was unrelenting, and though the taller Fields scored with straight left jabs and a rapid right cross, they did not come frequently enough to gain a margin in points. Kaplan poured far more blows into Fields, taking the decision.

He defeated Jewish boxing great, reigning world junior lightweight champion, Mushy Callahan in a non-title bout on November 22, 1927. Callahan was nearly knocked out in the second, ninth, and tenth, having difficulty remaining on his feet. Fields continually poured rights and lefts to the body and face, and was credited with six of the ten rounds. Callahan, possibly lacking conditioning, was returning to the ring after an illness of several months.

In a rare early-career loss, Fields dropped a ten-round unanimous decision to reigning world lightweight champion Sammy Mandell on February 3, 1928. Fields led the first few rounds with a strong body attack, but Mandell found his range in the third with long lunging lefts to Fields's left eye. Fields's injury put him on the defensive, and in the late rounds he was forced to do more infighting and clinching. He tried to turn the tables in the ninth, but it was too late to even the points differential. In their first meeting on April 4, 1927, before a disappointing crowd of only 5,000, Fields had fared far better against Mandell in a twelve-round newspaper decision at Wrigley Field in Los Angeles, winning handily according to the Los Angeles Times. The paper awarded Fields eight of the ten rounds, with only two to Mandell. Fields staggered Mandell in the sixth with an overhand right to the jaw. The no-decision bout, however, was not for a title and Fields was over the lightweight limit, letting Mandell walk away with his championship intact. The San Francisco Examiner believed Mandell had won by the slightest of margins, but noted that the younger and less experienced Fields easily took the second and tenth rounds with harder punching, though he failed to follow up his advantage.

=== NBA World welterweight champion, March 1929 ===
Fields won the world welterweight title in 1929 and 1932. He defeated Young Jack Thompson before 9,000 fans on March 25, 1929, in a ten round unanimous decision in Chicago for the vacant NBA welterweight title. The Akron Beacon Journal wrote that Fields was "unstoppable in his offensive, unswerving in his determination, and completely the master of his foe". In the first two rounds, Fields nearly knocked out Thompson. Thompson courageously remained on his feet throughout the bout, repeatedly trying to throw his signature right cross, though he usually missed. Fields blocked a number of Thompson's blows with his gloves and forearms, and stopped a few in mid-air. His best and most frequent blows came from left handed jabs and hooks. In the third, Thompson made a brief showing when he scored with a few vicious right crosses, but he failed to carry his momentum into the next round. The eighth was interrupted by a riot that spilled into the ring, and the fighting was more even in the last two rounds with both fighters exhausted. The tenth found Thompson trying to score a knockout but most of his blows were blocked by Fields, who kept the round even. Fields won decisively and was awarded seven of the ten rounds with only one to Thompson and two even.

Prior to the bout, the world welterweight title had become vacant as the National Boxing Association stripped Joe Dundee of the title. California, and the National Boxing Association, but not the powerful New York State Athletic Commission (NYSAC), officially recognized Fields as the champion on April 19, 1929. The NYSAC would not recognize Fields as champion until July when he faced Dundee.

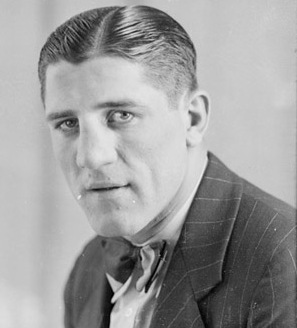
Champion Joe Dundee

On July 25, 1929, Fields faced Joe Dundee before a large crowd of 25,000 in a unifying match for the welterweight championship in Detroit. Fields was awarded the fight in the second round after Dundee, having been knocked down four times, delivered a foul blow while still down which left Fields incapable of continuing the fight. Dundee claimed that the foul was unintentional. Fields stated he believed Dundee, but noted that it was the only bout he had ever won on a foul. The win gave Fields unified recognition as world welterweight champion.

Fields defeated black boxer William "Guerilla" Jones, future world "Colored" welterweight champion, on October 21, 1929, in San Francisco before a crowd of 10,000. In an action filled ten rounds, Jones took the early lead and rocked Fields several times with straight rights to the jaw, but Fields's stamina and aggressiveness wore Jones down in the closing rounds. Fields's clearly took the ninth and tenth, and had a clear edge in five rounds, but could not defend against repeated rights from Jones throughout the bout. In a match two months later on December 13, referee Joe O'Connor stopped the bout, complaining that Jones was not giving his "usual exhibition" and ordered the promoter to pay the purses for both fighters. The Boston Globe felt the fight was legitimate, however, and that Jones's long arms against Fields's desire to fight at close range made the boxers look as though they were trying to avoid coming to blows.

In their fourth meeting, Fields scored a decisive victory in a non-title bout on January 24, 1930, over Vince Dundee, brother of Joe, in a ten round unanimous decision at Chicago Stadium. Dundee was down four times in the third round, but weathered the full ten, making a comeback in the late rounds. In the third, Dundee was down once for a count of eight, once for a count of nine, and was saved by the bell as he went down at the end of the round. Fields was awarded five rounds with only three for Dundee, and two even. Fields had defeated Vince Dundee in three previous ten round points decisions in Chicago on October 2, 1929, and in two meetings in Los Angeles on April 17, and February 14, 1928.

Fields lost his first bout in two years on February 22, 1930, against Young Corbett III in a ten round decision in San Francisco. Thrown off by his opponent's left hand stance, Fields fell behind in the early rounds and though he came back strongly late in the bout, the referee believed Corbett still held a margin on points. Since Corbett was two pounds over the welterweight limit, Fields's title was not at stake. Fields recovered his form two months later with a fourth round TKO against future welterweight champion Tommy Freeman before 8000 fans in Cleveland. Though Freeman had the edge in the first two rounds, and dazed Fields with a right to the nose in the third, Fields shot a right in the early fourth that cut Freeman's lip so badly he could not continue.

==== Loss of the world welter title ====
Before a crowd of 14,000, Fields lost his NBA world welterweight title to Young Jack Thompson on May 9, 1930, in a fifteen round points decision at Detroit's Olympia Stadium. Fields piled up a points lead in the early rounds, but Thompson came back with jabs and uppercuts in close fighting that badly wore down the reigning champion. In the seventh, Thompson's rights to the jaw sapped Field's strength, and a straight left opened a cut under his right eye. In the eleventh, an exhausted Fields clinched frequently. By the thirteenth, Fields was nearly defenseless, staggering and then falling into the arms of Thompson as the closing bell sounded. In the fourteenth, Fields made a struggling rally, but Thompson's margin in points was too great. Thompson was awarded ten of the fifteen rounds by the referee, with only three to Fields. His victory was considered an upset, as Fields had beaten him in two previous bouts.

He was first married on August 12, 1931. The couple separated in December 1940 and his wife, Martha Lynn, was granted a divorce in May 1944.

In the early 1930s, Fields took on the well known manager Jack Kearns.

=== Regaining world welter title, Jan 1932 ===
Fields regained the NBA (National Boxing Association) world welterweight championship before an enthusiastic crowd of 11,200, defeating Lou Brouillard in a ten round unanimous decision on January 28, 1932, at Chicago Stadium. Fields began to take a lead in points in the sixth with vicious lefts and strong sweeping rights that traveled from his hips. Continuing his attack in the seventh and eighth, he connected with a wide variety of blows, increasing his margin over the reigning champion. The tenth may have gone to Brouillard by a shade, but Fields had taken a wide points margin and was stronger as the final bell sounded to end the match.

Jackie was involved in a car accident in 1932 outside Louisville, Kentucky, that resulted in a detached retina, a serious injury to his left eye. Fields had lost most of his real estate fortune in the depression, and was reluctant to leave boxing despite the injury. Few realized it, but he had only partial vision in the eye, and would fight his next welterweight title bout with his vision impaired. Subsequent operations failed to restore the eye, and in 1938, he lost it entirely.

==== Loss of world welter title, Feb 1933 ====
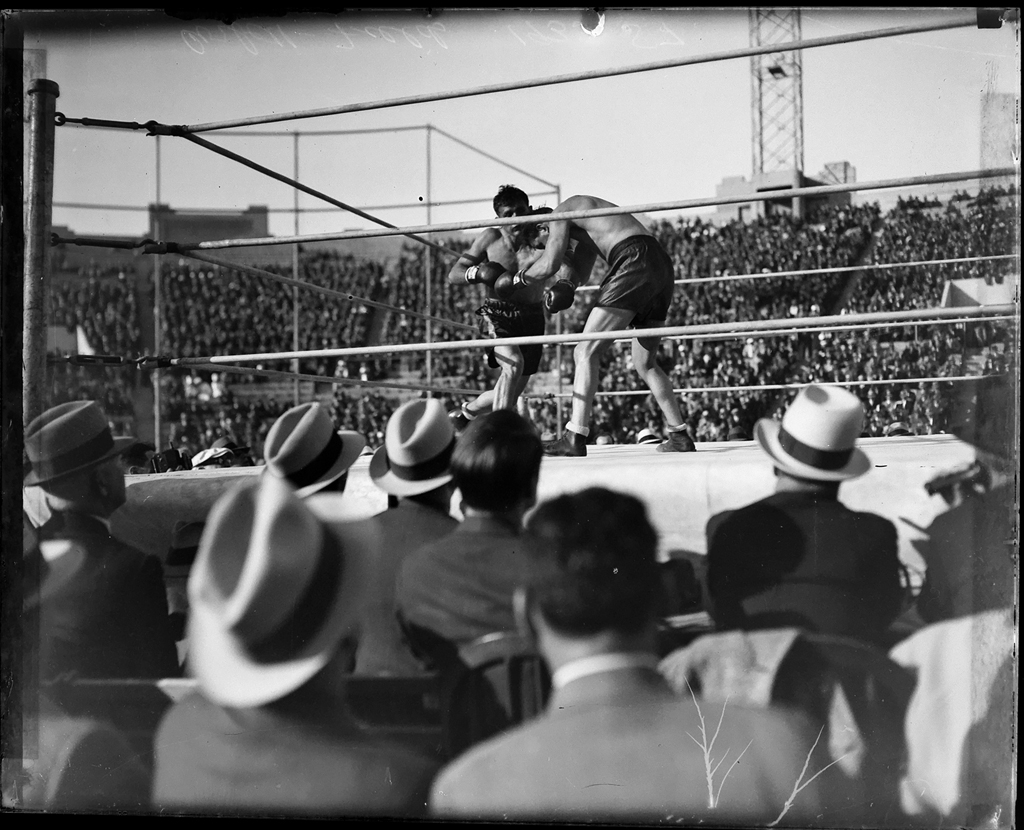
Corbett (facing camera) vs. Fields at Seals Stadium

Fields lost his NBA welterweight title on February 22, 1933, against Southpaw Young Corbett III before 15,000 fans in a ten round points decision at Seals Stadium in San Francisco. He could not stop the leads of Corbett in close in fighting, unable to counter punch soon enough as his opponent waded in. He failed to box effectively in defense and remained flat footed most of the bout, possibly from fatigue. The first five rounds belonged to Corbett, though Fields rallied in the sixth with shots to the face and body. In the seventh, Corbett rocked fields with lefts to the jaw four times at close range, slowing his opponent to a walk. In the ninth, Fields made his last effort, pounding Corbett around the ring with a two fisted attack. Unable to overcome a slow start, the referee gave only three rounds to Fields, with six to Corbett.

Three months after losing the welterweight title, Fields won a points decision against Young Peter Jackson in May 1933, and retired from boxing.

== Life after boxing ==
After he lost much of his real estate investments in the depression, Fields lived for a while in the Germantown section of Philadelphia and worked from 1935 through the 1940s as a salesman for the Wurlitzer Juke Box company and a beer manufacturer, Hannah and Hogg Distilleries.

While in Los Angeles, he appeared in the movies Battling Bunyan (1924), The Prizefighter and the Lady (1933), Big City (1937) and Heavyweight Championship of the World: Muhammad Ali vs. Floyd Patterson (1965). He coached the boxing scenes in 1934's Personality Kid, appeared in the TV movie Muhammad Ali vs. Ron Lyle (1975), as well as the TV programs, Wide World of Sports (1969), and Fight of the Week (1961). His movie entertainment jobs included work as a film editor for MGM and 20th Century Fox.

In 1957, Fields moved to Las Vegas, Nevada and became part owner of the Tropicana Las Vegas. He eventually sold his interest in the hotel, but stayed on as public relations director. In the 1960s, he worked as Chairman of the Nevada State Athletic Commission. In 1965, Fields coached the U.S. boxing team at the 1965 Maccabiah Games.

While in Las Vegas, he married his second wife, a former New York model and Las Vegas on-stage performer, Marjorie Fields, with whom he raised several step children.

Fields died in 1987 at the age of 79 at a nursing home in Las Vegas, Nevada.

In 1996 he was inducted into the Southern California Jewish Sports Hall of Fame.

== Professional boxing record ==
All information in this section is derived from BoxRec, unless otherwise stated.

=== Official record ===
86 fights	72 wins	9 losses
By knockout	31	1
By decision	40	8
By disqualification	1	0
Draws	2	
No contests	1	
Newspaper decisions/draws	2	

All newspaper decisions are officially regarded as “no decision” bouts and are not counted in the win/loss/draw column.

No.	Result	Record	Opponent	Type	Round	Date	Age	Location	Notes
86	Win	72–9–2 (3)	Young Peter Jackson	PTS	10	May 2, 1933	25 years, 82 days	Olympic Auditorium, Los Angeles, California, U.S.	
85	Loss	71–9–2 (3)	Young Corbett III	PTS	10	Feb 22, 1933	25 years, 13 days	Seals Stadium, San Francisco, California, U.S.	Lost NYSAC, NBA, and The Ring welterweight titles
84	Loss	71–8–2 (3)	Eddie Murdock	PTS	10	Dec 30, 1932	24 years, 325 days	Coliseum, San Diego, California, U.S.	
83	Win	71–7–2 (3)	Red Grigry	TKO	5 (10)	Dec 7, 1932	24 years, 302 days	Stockton, California, U.S.	
82	Win	70–7–2 (3)	Tommy Herman	KO	2 (10)	Dec 1, 1932	24 years, 296 days	Civic Auditorium, San Francisco, California, U.S.	
81	Win	69–7–2 (3)	Henry Firpo	NWS	10	May 6, 1932	24 years, 87 days	Jefferson County Armory, Louisville, Kentucky, U.S.	
80	Win	69–7–2 (2)	Pee Wee Jarrell	KO	4 (10)	Apr 5, 1932	24 years, 56 days	Memorial Hall, Dayton, Ohio, U.S.	
79	Win	68–7–2 (2)	Leslie Baker	TKO	5 (10)	Apr 1, 1932	24 years, 52 days	Boston Garden, Boston, Massachusetts, U.S.	
78	Win	67–7–2 (2)	Izzy Kline	KO	1 (10)	Mar 11, 1932	24 years, 31 days	McCullough's Arena, Salt Lake City, Utah, U.S.	
77	Win	66–7–2 (2)	Patsy Pollock	KO	2 (10)	Mar 8, 1932	24 years, 28 days	City Auditorium, Denver, Colorado, U.S.	
76	Loss	65–7–2 (2)	Jimmy Belmont	UD	10	Mar 4, 1932	24 years, 24 days	Boston Garden, Boston, Massachusetts, U.S.	
75	Win	65–6–2 (2)	Jimmy Belmont	TKO	8 (10)	Feb 29, 1932	24 years, 20 days	Motor Square Garden, Pittsburgh, Pennsylvania, U.S.	
74	Win	64–6–2 (2)	Lou Brouillard	UD	10	Jan 28, 1932	23 years, 353 days	Chicago Stadium, Chicago, Illinois, U.S.	Won NYSAC, NBA, and The Ring welterweight titles
73	Draw	63–6–2 (2)	Jimmy Belmont	PTS	10	Nov 16, 1931	23 years, 280 days	Motor Square Garden, Pittsburgh, Pennsylvania, U.S.	
72	Win	63–6–1 (2)	King Tut	PTS	10	Oct 8, 1931	23 years, 241 days	Olympia Stadium, Detroit, Michigan, U.S.	
71	Loss	62–6–1 (2)	Young Terry	PTS	10	Sep 17, 1931	23 years, 220 days	Madison Square Garden, New York City, New York, U.S.	
70	Win	62–5–1 (2)	Jackie Brady	UD	10	Feb 26, 1931	23 years, 17 days	Arena, Syracuse, New York, U.S.	
69	Win	61–5–1 (2)	Bucky Lawless	KO	5 (10)	Dec 19, 1930	22 years, 313 days	Olympia Stadium, Detroit, Michigan, U.S.	
68	Win	60–5–1 (2)	Paul Pirrone	MD	10	Dec 10, 1930	22 years, 304 days	Public Hall, Cleveland, Ohio, U.S.	
67	Win	59–5–1 (2)	Sam Bruce	MD	10	Nov 24, 1930	22 years, 288 days	Broadway Auditorium, Buffalo, New York, U.S.	
66	Win	58–5–1 (2)	Pete Susky	UD	10	Nov 14, 1930	22 years, 278 days	Watres Armory, Scranton, Pennsylvania, U.S.	
65	Win	57–5–1 (2)	Tommy Jordan	KO	3 (10)	Oct 7, 1930	22 years, 240 days	Armory, Indianapolis, Indiana, U.S.	
64	Win	56–5–1 (2)	Jack Horner	PTS	10	Sep 30, 1930	22 years, 233 days	Convention Hall, Rochester, New York, U.S.	
63	Loss	55–5–1 (2)	Jack Thompson	PTS	15	May 9, 1930	22 years, 89 days	Olympia Stadium, Detroit, Michigan, U.S.	Lost NYSAC, NBA, and The Ring welterweight titles
62	Win	55–4–1 (2)	Meyer Grace	KO	3 (10)	Apr 21, 1930	22 years, 71 days	Convention Hall, Kansas City, Missouri, U.S.	
61	Win	54–4–1 (2)	Tommy Freeman	TKO	4 (12)	Apr 8, 1930	22 years, 58 days	Public Hall, Cleveland, Ohio, U.S.	
60	Loss	53–4–1 (2)	Young Corbett III	PTS	10	Feb 22, 1930	22 years, 13 days	Recreation Park, San Francisco, California, U.S.	
59	Win	53–3–1 (2)	Vince Dundee	UD	10	Jan 24, 1930	21 years, 349 days	Chicago Stadium, Chicago, Illinois, U.S.	
58	Win	52–3–1 (2)	Jimmy Owens	TKO	2 (10)	Jan 10, 1930	21 years, 335 days	Chicago Stadium, Chicago, Illinois, U.S.	
57	Win	51–3–1 (2)	Alf Ros	PTS	10	Jan 6, 1930	21 years, 331 days	Arena, Philadelphia, Pennsylvania, U.S.	
56	NC	50–3–1 (2)	Gorilla Jones	NC	7 (10)	Dec 13, 1929	21 years, 307 days	Boston Garden, Boston, Massachusetts, U.S.	
55	Win	50–3–1 (1)	Fred Mahan	KO	2 (10)	Nov 4, 1929	21 years, 268 days	Kansas City, Missouri, U.S.	
54	Win	49–3–1 (1)	Gorilla Jones	PTS	10	Oct 21, 1929	21 years, 254 days	State Armory, San Francisco, California, U.S.	
53	Win	48–3–1 (1)	Vince Dundee	PTS	10	Oct 2, 1929	21 years, 235 days	Coliseum, Chicago, Illinois, U.S.	
52	Win	47–3–1 (1)	Joe Dundee	DQ	2 (15)	Jul 25, 1929	21 years, 166 days	State Fairgrounds Arena, Detroit, Michigan, U.S.	Retained NBA welterweight title; Won NYSAC and The Ring welterweight titles
51	Win	46–3–1 (1)	Farmer Joe Cooper	KO	1 (10)	Jun 28, 1929	21 years, 139 days	Mills Stadium, Chicago, Illinois, U.S.	
50	Win	45–3–1 (1)	Jackie Horner	KO	4 (10)	Jun 19, 1929	21 years, 130 days	Battery D Arena, Saint Louis, Missouri, U.S.	
49	Win	44–3–1 (1)	Clyde Chastain	PTS	10	May 24, 1929	21 years, 104 days	Chicago Stadium, Chicago, Illinois, U.S.	
48	Win	43–3–1 (1)	Jack Thompson	UD	10	Mar 25, 1929	21 years, 44 days	Coliseum, Chicago, Illinois, U.S.	Won vacant NBA welterweight title
47	Win	42–3–1 (1)	Al Van Ryan	TKO	5 (10)	Mar 8, 1929	21 years, 27 days	Olympia Stadium, Detroit, Michigan, U.S.	
46	Win	41–3–1 (1)	Baby Joe Gans	PTS	10	Feb 15, 1929	21 years, 6 days	Madison Square Garden, New York City, New York, U.S.	
45	Win	40–3–1 (1)	Jack McCarthy	PTS	10	Jan 28, 1929	20 years, 354 days	Dexter Park Pavilion, Chicago, Illinois, U.S.	
44	Win	39–3–1 (1)	Tommy Elks	TKO	7 (10)	Dec 28, 1928	20 years, 323 days	Legion Stadium, Hollywood, California, U.S.	
43	Win	38–3–1 (1)	Mike Payan	KO	2 (10)	Nov 30, 1928	20 years, 295 days	Dreamland Auditorium, San Francisco, California, U.S.	
42	Win	37–3–1 (1)	Sammy Baker	KO	2 (10)	Oct 30, 1928	20 years, 264 days	Wrigley Field, Los Angeles, California, U.S.	
41	Win	36–3–1 (1)	Jack Thompson	PTS	10	Oct 1, 1928	20 years, 235 days	State Armory, San Francisco, California, U.S.	
40	Win	35–3–1 (1)	Pete Meyers	TKO	4 (10)	Aug 10, 1928	20 years, 183 days	Dreamland Auditorium, San Francisco, California, U.S.	
39	Win	34–3–1 (1)	Joe Vargas	TKO	9 (10)	Jul 20, 1928	20 years, 162 days	Dreamland Auditorium, San Francisco, California, U.S.	
38	Win	33–3–1 (1)	Farmer Joe Cooper	PTS	10	Jul 13, 1928	20 years, 155 days	Dreamland Auditorium, San Francisco, California, U.S.	
37	Win	32–3–1 (1)	Jack Zivic	TKO	7 (10)	Jun 26, 1928	20 years, 138 days	Olympic Auditorium, Los Angeles, California, U.S.	
36	Win	31–3–1 (1)	Don Fraser	KO	3 (10)	Jun 8, 1928	20 years, 120 days	Legion Stadium, Hollywood, California, U.S.	
35	Win	30–3–1 (1)	Don Fraser	KO	1 (10)	May 4, 1928	20 years, 85 days	Legion Stadium, Hollywood, California, U.S.	
34	Win	29–3–1 (1)	Vince Dundee	PTS	10	Apr 17, 1928	20 years, 68 days	Olympic Auditorium, Los Angeles, California, U.S.	
33	Loss	28–3–1 (1)	Sammy Mandell	UD	10	Feb 23, 1928	20 years, 14 days	Coliseum, Chicago, Illinois, U.S.	
32	Win	28–2–1 (1)	Vince Dundee	PTS	10	Feb 14, 1928	20 years, 5 days	Olympic Auditorium, Los Angeles, California, U.S.	
31	Win	27–2–1 (1)	Charlie Feraci	PTS	10	Jan 13, 1928	19 years, 338 days	Coliseum, San Diego, California, U.S.	
30	Win	26–2–1 (1)	Buddy Saunders	PTS	10	Dec 20, 1927	19 years, 314 days	Olympic Auditorium, Los Angeles, California, U.S.	
29	Win	25–2–1 (1)	Dick Ramies	KO	2 (10)	Dec 2, 1927	19 years, 296 days	Legion Stadium, Hollywood, California, U.S.	
28	Win	24–2–1 (1)	Mushy Callahan	PTS	10	Nov 22, 1927	19 years, 286 days	Olympic Auditorium, Los Angeles, California, U.S.	
27	Win	23–2–1 (1)	Joey Silver	PTS	10	Nov 3, 1927	19 years, 267 days	Wrigley Field, Los Angeles, California, U.S.	
26	Win	22–2–1 (1)	Baby Joe Gans	PTS	10	Aug 30, 1927	19 years, 202 days	Olympic Auditorium, Los Angeles, California, U.S.	
25	Win	21–2–1 (1)	Frankie Fink	PTS	10	Jul 4, 1927	19 years, 145 days	Dexter Park Arena, New York City, New York, U.S.	
24	Loss	20–2–1 (1)	Louis "Kid" Kaplan	PTS	10	Jun 15, 1927	19 years, 126 days	Polo Grounds, New York City, New York, U.S.	
23	Win	20–1–1 (1)	Joey Kaufman	PTS	10	Jun 1, 1927	19 years, 112 days	Queensboro Stadium, Long Island City, Queens, New York City, New York, U.S.	
22	Win	19–1–1 (1)	Sammy Mandell	NWS	12	Apr 4, 1927	19 years, 54 days	Wrigley Field, Los Angeles, California, U.S.	
21	Win	19–1–1	Russell Whalen	PTS	10	Mar 11, 1927	19 years, 30 days	Legion Stadium, Hollywood, California, U.S.	
20	Win	18–1–1	Harry Brown	PTS	10	Jan 25, 1927	18 years, 350 days	Arena, Vernon, California, U.S.	
19	Win	17–1–1	Matty Mario	PTS	10	Jan 14, 1927	18 years, 339 days	Legion Stadium, Hollywood, California, U.S.	
18	Win	16–1–1	Jack Silver	TKO	4 (10)	Dec 21, 1926	18 years, 315 days	Dreamland Rink, San Francisco, California, U.S.	
17	Win	15–1–1	King Tut	PTS	10	Dec 7, 1926	18 years, 301 days	Arena, Vernon, California, U.S.	
16	Win	14–1–1	Sailor Paddy Mullen	KO	1 (10)	Nov 6, 1926	18 years, 270 days	Arena, Vernon, California, U.S.	
15	Win	13–1–1	Dick Hoppe	PTS	10	Sep 24, 1926	18 years, 227 days	Legion Stadium, Hollywood, California, U.S.	
14	Win	12–1–1	Sailor Ashmore	PTS	8	Sep 2, 1926	18 years, 205 days	Pasadena, California, U.S.	
13	Win	11–1–1	Roscoe Hall	PTS	10	Jul 16, 1926	18 years, 157 days	Legion Stadium, Hollywood, California, U.S.	
12	Win	10–1–1	Johnny Lamar	PTS	10	Jun 18, 1926	18 years, 129 days	Legion Stadium, Hollywood, California, U.S.	
11	Win	9–1–1	Johnny Lamar	PTS	10	Apr 28, 1926	18 years, 78 days	Olympic Auditorium, Los Angeles, California, U.S.	
10	Win	8–1–1	Phil Salvadore	PTS	10	Apr 9, 1926	18 years, 59 days	Legion Stadium, Hollywood, California, U.S.	
9	Win	7–1–1	Young Brown	TKO	5 (8)	Mar 12, 1926	18 years, 62 days	Sacramento, California, U.S.	
8	Win	6–1–1	Willie Buck	KO	3 (8)	Feb 24, 1926	18 years, 15 days	Olympic Auditorium, Los Angeles, California, U.S.	
7	Loss	5–1–1	Jimmy McLarnin	KO	2 (10)	Nov 12, 1925	17 years, 276 days	Olympic Auditorium, Los Angeles, California, U.S.	
6	Win	5–0–1	Frankie Fink	PTS	6	Sep 23, 1925	17 years, 226 days	Olympic Auditorium, Los Angeles, California, U.S.	
5	Draw	4–0–1	Johnny Lamar	PTS	6	Aug 12, 1925	17 years, 184 days	Olympic Auditorium, Los Angeles, California, U.S.	
4	Win	4–0	Billy Young	KO	1 (?)	Jun 9, 1925	17 years, 120 days	Arena, Vernon, California, U.S.	
3	Win	3–0	Joe Salas	PTS	10	May 8, 1925	17 years, 88 days	Legion Stadium, Hollywood, California, U.S.	
2	Win	2–0	Billy Young	KO	2 (8)	Apr 8, 1925	17 years, 58 days	Wilmington Bowl, Wilmington, California, U.S.	
1	Win	1–0	Benny Pascal	PTS	6	Feb 5, 1925	16 years, 362 days	Armory, Pasadena, California, U.S.	

=== Unofficial record ===
86 fights	74 wins	9 losses
By knockout	31	1
By decision	42	8
By disqualification	1	0
Draws	2	
No contests	1	

Record with the inclusion of newspaper decisions in the win/loss/draw column.

No.	Result	Record	Opponent	Type	Round	Date	Age	Location	Notes
86	Win	74–9–2 (1)	Young Peter Jackson	PTS	10	May 2, 1933	25 years, 82 days	Olympic Auditorium, Los Angeles, California, U.S.	
85	Loss	73–9–2 (1)	Young Corbett III	PTS	10	Feb 22, 1933	25 years, 13 days	Seals Stadium, San Francisco, California, U.S.	Lost NYSAC, NBA, and The Ring welterweight titles
84	Loss	73–8–2 (1)	Eddie Murdock	PTS	10	Dec 30, 1932	24 years, 325 days	Coliseum, San Diego, California, U.S.	
83	Win	73–7–2 (1)	Red Grigry	TKO	5 (10)	Dec 7, 1932	24 years, 302 days	Stockton, California, U.S.	
82	Win	72–7–2 (1)	Tommy Herman	KO	2 (10)	Dec 1, 1932	24 years, 296 days	Civic Auditorium, San Francisco, California, U.S.	
81	Win	71–7–2 (1)	Henry Firpo	NWS	10	May 6, 1932	24 years, 87 days	Jefferson County Armory, Louisville, Kentucky, U.S.	
80	Win	70–7–2 (1)	Pee Wee Jarrell	KO	4 (10)	Apr 5, 1932	24 years, 56 days	Memorial Hall, Dayton, Ohio, U.S.	
79	Win	69–7–2 (1)	Leslie Baker	TKO	5 (10)	Apr 1, 1932	24 years, 52 days	Boston Garden, Boston, Massachusetts, U.S.	
78	Win	68–7–2 (1)	Izzy Kline	KO	1 (10)	Mar 11, 1932	24 years, 31 days	McCullough's Arena, Salt Lake City, Utah, U.S.	
77	Win	67–7–2 (1)	Patsy Pollock	KO	2 (10)	Mar 8, 1932	24 years, 28 days	City Auditorium, Denver, Colorado, U.S.	
76	Loss	66–7–2 (1)	Jimmy Belmont	UD	10	Mar 4, 1932	24 years, 24 days	Boston Garden, Boston, Massachusetts, U.S.	
75	Win	66–6–2 (1)	Jimmy Belmont	TKO	8 (10)	Feb 29, 1932	24 years, 20 days	Motor Square Garden, Pittsburgh, Pennsylvania, U.S.	
74	Win	65–6–2 (1)	Lou Brouillard	UD	10	Jan 28, 1932	23 years, 353 days	Chicago Stadium, Chicago, Illinois, U.S.	Won NYSAC, NBA, and The Ring welterweight titles
73	Draw	64–6–2 (1)	Jimmy Belmont	PTS	10	Nov 16, 1931	23 years, 280 days	Motor Square Garden, Pittsburgh, Pennsylvania, U.S.	
72	Win	64–6–1 (1)	King Tut	PTS	10	Oct 8, 1931	23 years, 241 days	Olympia Stadium, Detroit, Michigan, U.S.	
71	Loss	63–6–1 (1)	Young Terry	PTS	10	Sep 17, 1931	23 years, 220 days	Madison Square Garden, New York City, New York, U.S.	
70	Win	63–5–1 (1)	Jackie Brady	UD	10	Feb 26, 1931	23 years, 17 days	Arena, Syracuse, New York, U.S.	
69	Win	62–5–1 (1)	Bucky Lawless	KO	5 (10)	Dec 19, 1930	22 years, 313 days	Olympia Stadium, Detroit, Michigan, U.S.	
68	Win	61–5–1 (1)	Paul Pirrone	MD	10	Dec 10, 1930	22 years, 304 days	Public Hall, Cleveland, Ohio, U.S.	
67	Win	60–5–1 (1)	Sam Bruce	MD	10	Nov 24, 1930	22 years, 288 days	Broadway Auditorium, Buffalo, New York, U.S.	
66	Win	59–5–1 (1)	Pete Susky	UD	10	Nov 14, 1930	22 years, 278 days	Watres Armory, Scranton, Pennsylvania, U.S.	
65	Win	58–5–1 (1)	Tommy Jordan	KO	3 (10)	Oct 7, 1930	22 years, 240 days	Armory, Indianapolis, Indiana, U.S.	
64	Win	57–5–1 (1)	Jack Horner	PTS	10	Sep 30, 1930	22 years, 233 days	Convention Hall, Rochester, New York, U.S.	
63	Loss	56–5–1 (1)	Jack Thompson	PTS	15	May 9, 1930	22 years, 89 days	Olympia Stadium, Detroit, Michigan, U.S.	Lost NYSAC, NBA, and The Ring welterweight titles
62	Win	56–4–1 (1)	Meyer Grace	KO	3 (10)	Apr 21, 1930	22 years, 71 days	Convention Hall, Kansas City, Missouri, U.S.	
61	Win	55–4–1 (1)	Tommy Freeman	TKO	4 (12)	Apr 8, 1930	22 years, 58 days	Public Hall, Cleveland, Ohio, U.S.	
60	Loss	54–4–1 (1)	Young Corbett III	PTS	10	Feb 22, 1930	22 years, 13 days	Recreation Park, San Francisco, California, U.S.	
59	Win	54–3–1 (1)	Vince Dundee	UD	10	Jan 24, 1930	21 years, 349 days	Chicago Stadium, Chicago, Illinois, U.S.	
58	Win	53–3–1 (1)	Jimmy Owens	TKO	2 (10)	Jan 10, 1930	21 years, 335 days	Chicago Stadium, Chicago, Illinois, U.S.	
57	Win	52–3–1 (1)	Alf Ros	PTS	10	Jan 6, 1930	21 years, 331 days	Arena, Philadelphia, Pennsylvania, U.S.	
56	NC	51–3–1 (1)	Gorilla Jones	NC	7 (10)	Dec 13, 1929	21 years, 307 days	Boston Garden, Boston, Massachusetts, U.S.	
55	Win	51–3–1	Fred Mahan	KO	2 (10)	Nov 4, 1929	21 years, 268 days	Kansas City, Missouri, U.S.	
54	Win	50–3–1	Gorilla Jones	PTS	10	Oct 21, 1929	21 years, 254 days	State Armory, San Francisco, California, U.S.	
53	Win	49–3–1	Vince Dundee	PTS	10	Oct 2, 1929	21 years, 235 days	Coliseum, Chicago, Illinois, U.S.	
52	Win	48–3–1	Joe Dundee	DQ	2 (15)	Jul 25, 1929	21 years, 166 days	State Fairgrounds Arena, Detroit, Michigan, U.S.	Retained NBA welterweight title; Won NYSAC and The Ring welterweight titles
51	Win	47–3–1	Farmer Joe Cooper	KO	1 (10)	Jun 28, 1929	21 years, 139 days	Mills Stadium, Chicago, Illinois, U.S.	
50	Win	46–3–1	Jackie Horner	KO	4 (10)	Jun 19, 1929	21 years, 130 days	Battery D Arena, Saint Louis, Missouri, U.S.	
49	Win	45–3–1	Clyde Chastain	PTS	10	May 24, 1929	21 years, 104 days	Chicago Stadium, Chicago, Illinois, U.S.	
48	Win	44–3–1	Jack Thompson	UD	10	Mar 25, 1929	21 years, 44 days	Coliseum, Chicago, Illinois, U.S.	Won vacant NBA welterweight title
47	Win	43–3–1	Al Van Ryan	TKO	5 (10)	Mar 8, 1929	21 years, 27 days	Olympia Stadium, Detroit, Michigan, U.S.	
46	Win	42–3–1	Baby Joe Gans	PTS	10	Feb 15, 1929	21 years, 6 days	Madison Square Garden, New York City, New York, U.S.	
45	Win	41–3–1	Jack McCarthy	PTS	10	Jan 28, 1929	20 years, 354 days	Dexter Park Pavilion, Chicago, Illinois, U.S.	
44	Win	40–3–1	Tommy Elks	TKO	7 (10)	Dec 28, 1928	20 years, 323 days	Legion Stadium, Hollywood, California, U.S.	
43	Win	39–3–1	Mike Payan	KO	2 (10)	Nov 30, 1928	20 years, 295 days	Dreamland Auditorium, San Francisco, California, U.S.	
42	Win	38–3–1	Sammy Baker	KO	2 (10)	Oct 30, 1928	20 years, 264 days	Wrigley Field, Los Angeles, California, U.S.	
41	Win	37–3–1	Jack Thompson	PTS	10	Oct 1, 1928	20 years, 235 days	State Armory, San Francisco, California, U.S.	
40	Win	36–3–1	Pete Meyers	TKO	4 (10)	Aug 10, 1928	20 years, 183 days	Dreamland Auditorium, San Francisco, California, U.S.	
39	Win	35–3–1	Joe Vargas	TKO	9 (10)	Jul 20, 1928	20 years, 162 days	Dreamland Auditorium, San Francisco, California, U.S.	
38	Win	34–3–1	Farmer Joe Cooper	PTS	10	Jul 13, 1928	20 years, 155 days	Dreamland Auditorium, San Francisco, California, U.S.	
37	Win	33–3–1	Jack Zivic	TKO	7 (10)	Jun 26, 1928	20 years, 138 days	Olympic Auditorium, Los Angeles, California, U.S.	
36	Win	32–3–1	Don Fraser	KO	3 (10)	Jun 8, 1928	20 years, 120 days	Legion Stadium, Hollywood, California, U.S.	
35	Win	31–3–1	Don Fraser	KO	1 (10)	May 4, 1928	20 years, 85 days	Legion Stadium, Hollywood, California, U.S.	
34	Win	30–3–1	Vince Dundee	PTS	10	Apr 17, 1928	20 years, 68 days	Olympic Auditorium, Los Angeles, California, U.S.	
33	Loss	29–3–1	Sammy Mandell	UD	10	Feb 23, 1928	20 years, 14 days	Coliseum, Chicago, Illinois, U.S.	
32	Win	29–2–1	Vince Dundee	PTS	10	Feb 14, 1928	20 years, 5 days	Olympic Auditorium, Los Angeles, California, U.S.	
31	Win	28–2–1	Charlie Feraci	PTS	10	Jan 13, 1928	19 years, 338 days	Coliseum, San Diego, California, U.S.	
30	Win	27–2–1	Buddy Saunders	PTS	10	Dec 20, 1927	19 years, 314 days	Olympic Auditorium, Los Angeles, California, U.S.	
29	Win	26–2–1	Dick Ramies	KO	2 (10)	Dec 2, 1927	19 years, 296 days	Legion Stadium, Hollywood, California, U.S.	
28	Win	25–2–1	Mushy Callahan	PTS	10	Nov 22, 1927	19 years, 286 days	Olympic Auditorium, Los Angeles, California, U.S.	
27	Win	24–2–1	Joey Silver	PTS	10	Nov 3, 1927	19 years, 267 days	Wrigley Field, Los Angeles, California, U.S.	
26	Win	23–2–1	Baby Joe Gans	PTS	10	Aug 30, 1927	19 years, 202 days	Olympic Auditorium, Los Angeles, California, U.S.	
25	Win	22–2–1	Frankie Fink	PTS	10	Jul 4, 1927	19 years, 145 days	Dexter Park Arena, New York City, New York, U.S.	
24	Loss	21–2–1	Louis "Kid" Kaplan	PTS	10	Jun 15, 1927	19 years, 126 days	Polo Grounds, New York City, New York, U.S.	
23	Win	21–1–1	Joey Kaufman	PTS	10	Jun 1, 1927	19 years, 112 days	Queensboro Stadium, Long Island City, Queens, New York City, New York, U.S.	
22	Win	20–1–1	Sammy Mandell	NWS	12	Apr 4, 1927	19 years, 54 days	Wrigley Field, Los Angeles, California, U.S.	
21	Win	19–1–1	Russell Whalen	PTS	10	Mar 11, 1927	19 years, 30 days	Legion Stadium, Hollywood, California, U.S.	
20	Win	18–1–1	Harry Brown	PTS	10	Jan 25, 1927	18 years, 350 days	Arena, Vernon, California, U.S.	
19	Win	17–1–1	Matty Mario	PTS	10	Jan 14, 1927	18 years, 339 days	Legion Stadium, Hollywood, California, U.S.	
18	Win	16–1–1	Jack Silver	TKO	4 (10)	Dec 21, 1926	18 years, 315 days	Dreamland Rink, San Francisco, California, U.S.	
17	Win	15–1–1	King Tut	PTS	10	Dec 7, 1926	18 years, 301 days	Arena, Vernon, California, U.S.	
16	Win	14–1–1	Sailor Paddy Mullen	KO	1 (10)	Nov 6, 1926	18 years, 270 days	Arena, Vernon, California, U.S.	
15	Win	13–1–1	Dick Hoppe	PTS	10	Sep 24, 1926	18 years, 227 days	Legion Stadium, Hollywood, California, U.S.	
14	Win	12–1–1	Sailor Ashmore	PTS	8	Sep 2, 1926	18 years, 205 days	Pasadena, California, U.S.	
13	Win	11–1–1	Roscoe Hall	PTS	10	Jul 16, 1926	18 years, 157 days	Legion Stadium, Hollywood, California, U.S.	
12	Win	10–1–1	Johnny Lamar	PTS	10	Jun 18, 1926	18 years, 129 days	Legion Stadium, Hollywood, California, U.S.	
11	Win	9–1–1	Johnny Lamar	PTS	10	Apr 28, 1926	18 years, 78 days	Olympic Auditorium, Los Angeles, California, U.S.	
10	Win	8–1–1	Phil Salvadore	PTS	10	Apr 9, 1926	18 years, 59 days	Legion Stadium, Hollywood, California, U.S.	
9	Win	7–1–1	Young Brown	TKO	5 (8)	Mar 12, 1926	18 years, 62 days	Sacramento, California, U.S.	
8	Win	6–1–1	Willie Buck	KO	3 (8)	Feb 24, 1926	18 years, 15 days	Olympic Auditorium, Los Angeles, California, U.S.	
7	Loss	5–1–1	Jimmy McLarnin	KO	2 (10)	Nov 12, 1925	17 years, 276 days	Olympic Auditorium, Los Angeles, California, U.S.	
6	Win	5–0–1	Frankie Fink	PTS	6	Sep 23, 1925	17 years, 226 days	Olympic Auditorium, Los Angeles, California, U.S.	
5	Draw	4–0–1	Johnny Lamar	PTS	6	Aug 12, 1925	17 years, 184 days	Olympic Auditorium, Los Angeles, California, U.S.	
4	Win	4–0	Billy Young	KO	1 (?)	Jun 9, 1925	17 years, 120 days	Arena, Vernon, California, U.S.	
3	Win	3–0	Joe Salas	PTS	10	May 8, 1925	17 years, 88 days	Legion Stadium, Hollywood, California, U.S.	
2	Win	2–0	Billy Young	KO	2 (8)	Apr 8, 1925	17 years, 58 days	Wilmington Bowl, Wilmington, California, U.S.	
1	Win	1–0	Benny Pascal	PTS	6	Feb 5, 1925	16 years, 362 days	Armory, Pasadena, California, U.S.	

== Titles in boxing ==
=== Major world titles ===
- NYSAC welterweight champion (147 lbs) (2×)
- NBA (WBA) welterweight champion (147 lbs) (2×)

=== The Ring magazine titles ===
- The Ring welterweight champion (147 lbs) (2×)

=== Regional/International titles ===
- Mexico welterweight champion (147 lbs)

=== Undisputed titles ===
- Undisputed welterweight champion (2×)

=== Amateur titles ===
- Featherweight Olympic gold medal (1924) (Note: Youngest Olympic boxing gold medalist ever (16 years, 162 days old).)

== See also ==
- List of welterweight boxing champions
- List of select Jewish boxers

== Notes and references ==
=== References ===
Achievements
Preceded by Joe Dundee	World Welterweight Champion; July 25, 1929 – May 9, 1930	Succeeded by Jack Thompson
Preceded by Lou Brouillard	World Welterweight Champion; January 28, 1932 – February 22, 1933	Succeeded by Young Corbett III
