= Raymond Devergnies =

Belgian boxer

Raymond Devergnies (20 August 1907 – 11 November 1987) was a Belgian boxer. He competed in the 1924 Summer Olympics. In 1924, Devergnies finished fourth in the featherweight class after losing the bronze medal bout to Pedro Quartucci.
