= Merwin Graham =

American athlete

Merwin ("Marvin") B. Graham (March 4, 1903 – January 24, 1989) was an American track and field athlete who competed in the 1924 Summer Olympics. He was born in Fairview, West Virginia, attended high school in Bartlesville, Oklahoma and later attended the University of Kansas, where he was a member of the KU track team. In 1924 he finished ninth in the Olympic triple jump competition in Paris, France.
