= Herschel Smith =

American wrestler

Personal information
- Born: January 25, 1900 Chicago, Illinois, U.S.
- Died: January 3, 1964 (aged 63) Silver Creek Township, Michigan, U.S.

Sport
- Country: United States
- Sport: Wrestling
- Event: Freestyle
- College team: Navy
- Team: USA

Herschel Smith (January 25, 1900 – January 3, 1964) was an American wrestler. He competed in the freestyle middleweight event at the 1924 Summer Olympics.
