= Agnew Burlie =

Canadian boxer (1906–1952)

Personal information
- Nationality: Canadian
- Born: 1 July 1906; Dundee, Scotland
- Died: 24 January 1952 (aged 45); Toronto, Ontario, Canada

Sport
- Sport: Boxing

Agnew Burlie (1 July 1906 – 24 January 1952) was a Canadian boxer. He competed in the men's featherweight event at the 1924 Summer Olympics.
