= Walter Wright (wrestler) =

American wrestler

Personal information
- Born: February 19, 1901 Webster, New York, U.S.
- Died: January 1982 (aged 80–81) Webster, New York, U.S.

Sport
- Country: United States
- Sport: Wrestling
- Events: Freestyle and Folkstyle
- College team: Cornell
- Team: USA

Walter Wright (February 19, 1901 – January 1982) was an American wrestler. He competed in the freestyle middleweight event at the 1924 Summer Olympics.
