= Rodman Wanamaker (polo) =

American polo player (1899–1976)

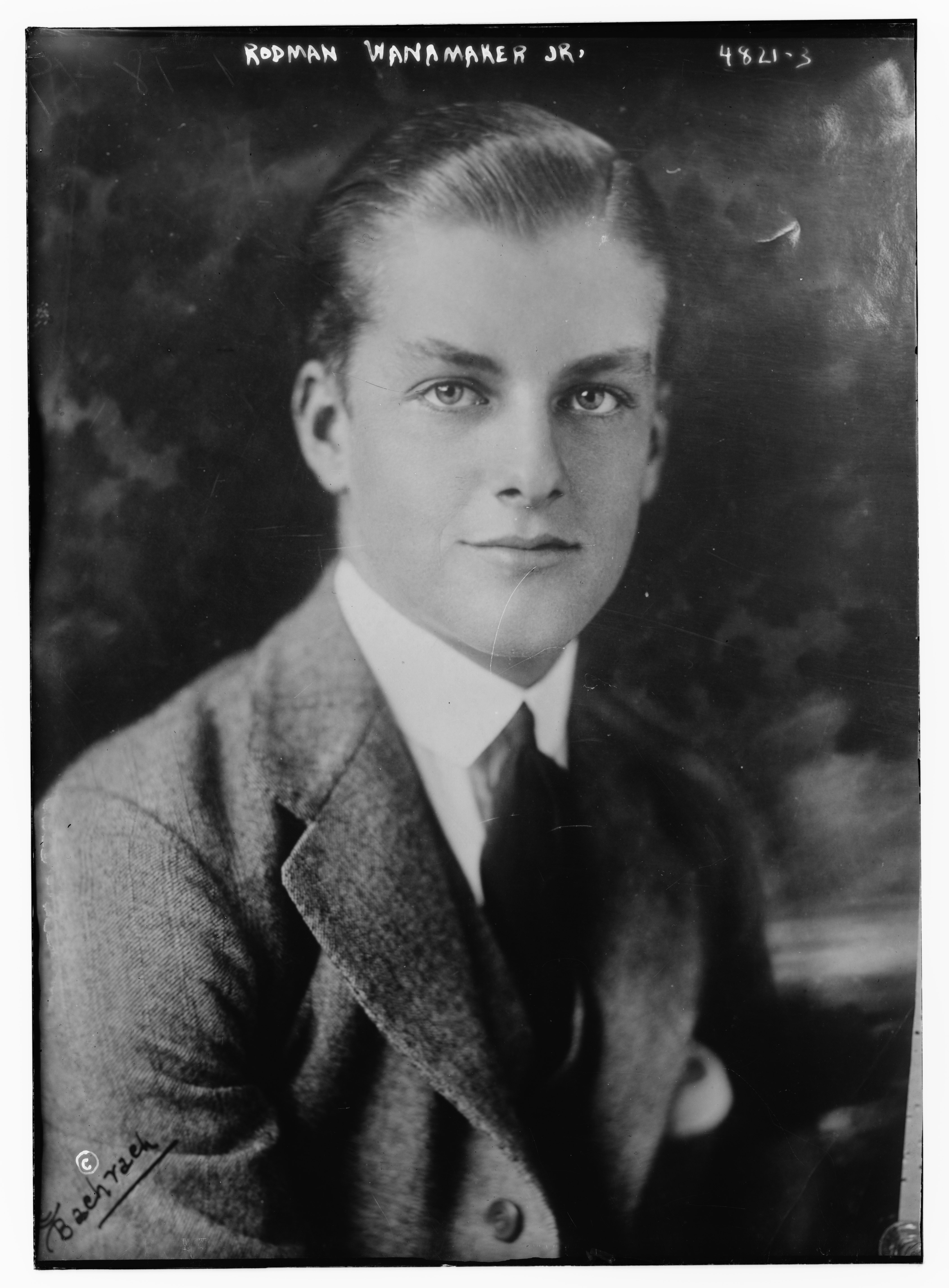
- Wanamaker in 1915

Personal information
- Born: October 10, 1899 Philadelphia, Pennsylvania, United States
- Died: February 3, 1976 (aged 76) Southampton, New York, United States

Sport
- Sport: Polo

Rodman Wanamaker (October 10, 1899 – February 3, 1976) was an American polo player. He competed in the polo tournament at the 1924 Summer Olympics winning a silver medal.
