= Harry Dingley =

British boxer

Personal information
- Nationality: British
- Born: 19 April 1903; Glasgow, Scotland
- Died: 20 August 1988 (aged 85); Cleland, Scotland

Sport
- Sport: Boxing

Harry Dingley (19 April 1903 – 20 August 1988) was a British boxer. He competed in the men's featherweight event at the 1924 Summer Olympics.
