= Marcel Depont =

French boxer

- Born: 23 February 1901
- Died: 30 September 1981 (aged 80)

Marcel Depont (23 February 1901 – 30 September 1981) was a French boxer. He competed in the 1924 Summer Olympics. In 1924, Depont was eliminated in the quarter-finals of the featherweight class after losing his fight to the upcoming bronze medalist Pedro Quartucci.
