= Charles MacWilliam =

American wrestler

Personal information
- Full name: Charles Milton MacWilliam
- Born: January 10, 1903 Perth Amboy, New Jersey, U.S.
- Died: September 30, 1975 (aged 72) Waterbury, Connecticut, U.S.

Sport
- Country: United States
- Sport: Wrestling
- Events: Freestyle and Folkstyle
- College team: Cornell
- Team: USA

Charles Milton MacWilliam (January 10, 1903 – September 30, 1975) was an American wrestler. He competed in the freestyle bantamweight event at the 1924 Summer Olympics.
