= Olaf Hansen =

Norwegian boxer

Olaf Hansen Frønsdal (11 October 1906 – 31 October 1986) was a Norwegian boxer who competed in the 1924 Summer Olympics. In 1924 he was eliminated in the second round of the featherweight class after losing his fight to the eventual gold medalist Jackie Fields.
