= Mossy Doyle =

Irish boxer

Personal information
- Nationality: Irish
- Born: 16 May 1903

Sport
- Sport: Boxing

Mossy Doyle (born 16 May 1903, date of death unknown) was an Irish boxer. He competed in the men's featherweight event at the 1924 Summer Olympics. At the 1924 Summer Olympics, he lost to Jackie Fields of the United States.
