= Gaston Ducayla =

French wrestler

- Born: 31 August 1898; Paris, France
- Died: 17 April 1986 (aged 87)

Gaston Ducayla (31 August 1898 – 17 April 1986) was a French wrestler. He competed in the freestyle bantamweight event at the 1924 Summer Olympics.
