= Boxing at the 1924 Summer Olympics =

Boxing at the Games of the VIII Olympiad
- Dates: 15-20 July 1924

These are the results of the boxing competition at the 1924 Summer Olympics in Paris. Medals were awarded in eight weight classes. The competitions were held from 15 to 20 July.

== Medal summary ==
Games	Gold	Silver	Bronze
Flyweight (−50.8 kg / 112 lb)	Fidel La Barba; United States	James McKenzie; Great Britain	Raymond Fee; United States
Bantamweight (−53.5 kg / 118 lb)	William Smith; South Africa	Salvatore Tripoli; United States	Jean Ces; France
Featherweight (−57.2 kg / 126 lb)	Jackie Fields; United States	Joseph Salas; United States	Pedro Quartucci; Argentina
Lightweight (−61.2 kg / 135 lb)	Hans Jacob Nielsen; Denmark	Alfredo Copello; Argentina	Frederick Boylstein; United States
Welterweight (−66.7 kg / 147 lb)	Jean Delarge; Belgium	Héctor Méndez; Argentina	Douglas Lewis; Canada
Middleweight (−72.6 kg / 160 lb)	Harry Mallin; Great Britain	John Elliott; Great Britain	Joseph Jules Beecken; Belgium
Light heavyweight (−79.4 kg / 175 lb)	Harry Mitchell; Great Britain	Thyge Petersen; Denmark	Sverre Sørsdal; Norway
Heavyweight (over 79.4 kg/175 lb)	Otto von Porat; Norway	Søren Petersen; Denmark	Alfredo Porzio; Argentina

== Participating nations ==
A total of 181 boxers from 27 nations competed at the Paris Games:

- Argentina (10)
- Australia (3)
- Austria (3)
- Belgium (10)
- Canada (9)
- Chile (4)
- Denmark (8)
- Egypt (1)
- Estonia (1)
- France (16)
- Great Britain (16)
- Greece (1)
- Hungary (1)
- Ireland (7)
- Italy (16)
- Latvia (1)
- Luxembourg (6)
- Netherlands (9)
- New Zealand (1)
- Norway (9)
- Poland (5)
- South Africa (4)
- Spain (7)
- Sweden (5)
- Switzerland (7)
- United States (16)
- Uruguay (5)

== Medal table ==
Rank	Nation	Gold	Silver	Bronze	Total
1	United States	2	2	2	6
2	Great Britain	2	2	0	4
3	Denmark	1	2	0	3
4	Belgium	1	0	1	2
4	Norway	1	0	1	2
6	South Africa	1	0	0	1
7	Argentina	0	2	2	4
8	Canada	0	0	1	1
8	France	0	0	1	1
Totals (9 entries)		8	8	8	24
