= Sam Dalrymple (soccer) =

American soccer player

Personal information
- Full name: Samuel Hugh Dalrymple
- Date of birth: December 22, 1901
- Place of birth: Philadelphia, Pennsylvania, United States
- Date of death: January 1981
- Place of death: Norristown, Pennsylvania, United States
- Position: Forward

Senior career*
Years	Team	Apps	(Gls)
- Disston A.A.

International career
1924	United States	2	(0)
- * Club domestic league appearances and goals

Sam Dalrymple (December 22, 1901 – January 1981) was a former U.S. soccer forward. Dalrymple earned two cap with the U.S. national team, both at the 1924 Summer Olympics. The U.S. won the first game, 1–0 against Estonia, but lost the second, against Uruguay, in the quarterfinals. At some point in his career, he played for Disston A.A.

He was born in Philadelphia, Pennsylvania.
