= Jakes Mulholland =

American soccer player

James "Jakes" H. Mulholland (October 1, 1902 – August 19, 1969) was a former U.S. soccer defender who earned two cap with the U.S. national team in 1924. Mulholland was a member of the U.S. soccer team at the 1924 Summer Olympics. While he was a member of the U.S. team at the Olympics, Mulholland did not play in the two U.S. games. However, following the tournament, the U.S. had two exhibition games. Mulholland played in both, a win over Poland and a loss to Ireland. In 1928, he played one game with Bethlehem Steel F.C. of the American Soccer League and an unknown number with Bethlehem in the Eastern Professional Soccer League.
