= Joseph Salas =

American boxer

Medal record

Men's boxing

Representing the United States

Olympic Games
Silver medal – second place	1924 Paris	Featherweight

Joseph I. Salas (December 28, 1905 – June 11, 1987) was an American featherweight professional boxer who competed in the 1920s. He won a silver medal in Boxing at the 1924 Summer Olympics, losing against future world champion Jackie Fields in the final bout. He was of Mexican American descent.

== Amateur career ==
Salas won the National AAU Featherweight champion in 1924.

=== Olympic Games Results (1924) ===
- Defeated Agnew Burlie (Canada) PTS
- Defeated Heinz Levy (Netherlands) PTS
- Defeated Bruno Petrarca (Italy) DQ 2
- Defeated Jean Devergnies (Belgium) PTS
- Lost to Jackie Fields (United States) PTS

== Professional career ==
As a professional, Salas accumulated a record of 28 wins, 6 losses, and 4 draws. His career was hampered by hand injuries. Upon retiring in 1931, he taught boxing at El Sereno Boys Club and served as a coach for the U.S. boxing team at the 1932 Olympics.
