= Pedro Quartucci =

Argentine boxer and actor (1905–1983)

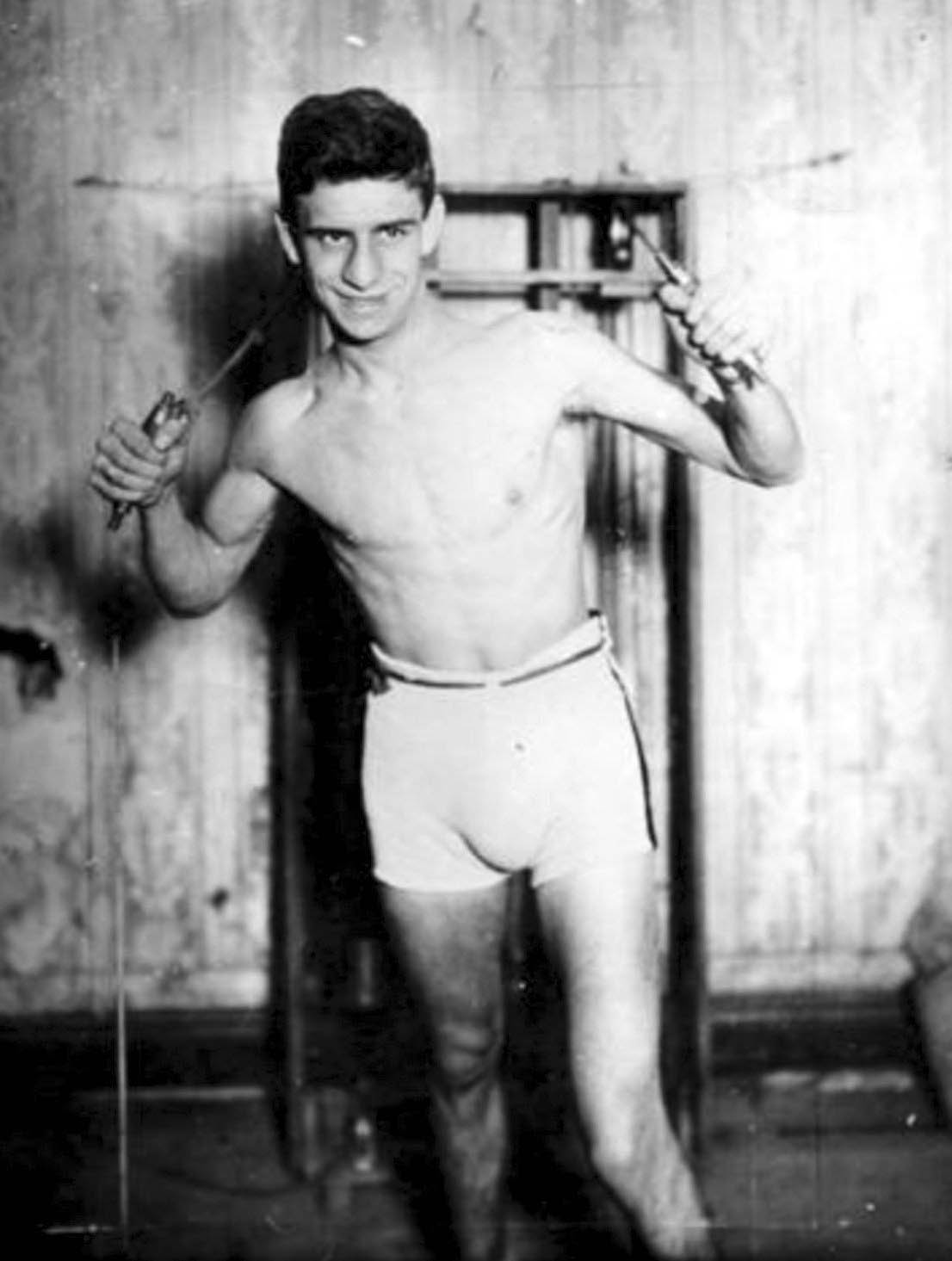
- Born: July 30, 1905; Buenos Aires, Argentina
- Died: April 20, 1983 (aged 77); Buenos Aires, Argentina
- Occupations: boxer, actor
Medal record
Men's boxing
Olympic Games
Bronze medal – third place	1924 Paris	Featherweight

Pedro Quartucci (July 30, 1905 in Buenos Aires – April 20, 1983 in Buenos Aires) was an Argentine boxer and actor.|title=Pedro Quartucci

== Boxing career ==
Pedro Quartucci was born in the former Distrito Federal, Buenos Aires, to parents Angelo Quartucci and Lucia Jacinta Diana. As a featherweight professional boxer who competed in the 1920s, he won a bronze medal in Boxing at the 1924 Summer Olympics in the featherweight division, losing against Joseph Salas in the semi-final. After his Olympic medal, he turned professional and in the year 1925 he fought 3 bouts in New York City, all of which we won, and one in his hometown of Buenos Aires, which he lost to Luis Rayo

== Acting career ==
He then pursued an acting career, having previously acted in ‘Til after her death’ as a child actor in 1916, and henceforth appeared in dozens of Argentine films and television series from 1931 until 1980. He appeared in films such as Al marido hay que seguirlo and Dancing in 1933 and 1948, respectively. He died of a heart attack in 1983.

== Selected filmography ==
- Luces de Buenos Aires (1931)
- Dancing (1933)
- The Favorite (1935)
- Goal (1936)
- Palermo (1937)
- Melodies of America (1941)
- Girls Orchestra (1941)
- The New Bell (1950)
- The Honourable Tenant (1951)
- Cómo te extraño (1966)
