= Paul Wyatt =

American swimmer and Olympic medalist

- Wyatt in 1928

Personal information
- Full name: Paul Henry Wyatt
- National team: United States
- Born: February 27, 1907 Brier Hill, Pennsylvania, U.S.
- Died: December 15, 1970 (aged 63) Brownsville, Pennsylvania, U.S.
- Occupations: X-ray lab tech, biochemist
- Height: 6 ft 0 in (1.83 m)
- Spouse: Juanita Knuth (m. 1946)

Sport
- Sport: Swimming
- Strokes: Backstroke
- Club: Uniontown YMCA
- Coach: Bill Bachrach (Olympics)
Medal record
Men's swimming
Representing the United States
Olympic Games
Silver medal – second place	1924 Paris	100 m backstroke
Bronze medal – third place	1928 Amsterdam	100 m backstroke

Paul Henry Wyatt (February 27, 1907 – December 15, 1970) was an American competition swimmer for Pennsylvania's Uniontown YMCA and a two-time Olympic medalist, representing the United States in the 100-meter backstroke at both the 1924 Paris and 1928 Amsterdam Olympics. After ending his swimming career around 1928, he worked twenty-three years as an X-Ray and lab technician primarily at Brownsville Hospital in Southwestern Pennsylvania quite near where he grew up. After 1954, he worked as a biochemist and lab technician at a hospital in Ely, Nevada and beginning around 1956 set up his own lab in Carson City and Zephry Cove, Nevada, before returning to the Brownsville area around 1963.

== Early education and swimming ==
Paul H. Wyatt was born February 27, 1907 in Southwestern Pennsylvania to Jesse Bailes and Anna Murphy Wyatt in the small coal-mining community of Brier Hill, Pennsylvania around forty miles South of Pittsburgh, quite close to Uniontown, Pennsylvania and Brownsville, Pennsylvania. Known by many in Southwestern Pennsylvania, Wyatt's father Jesse had served two terms as a tax collector and later as a Justice of the Peace in Redstone County, living in nearby Republic, Pennsylvania. According to one source, Wyatt's childhood may have been a difficult one, as he was raised alternately by both parents and grandparents, with his parents separating when he was thirteen. According to local legend, Paul Wyatt introduced himself to his sport at the age of eight when he first swam in a creek in nearby Perryopolis, Pennsylvania, and like many young men of his era later swam in the Monongahela River, adjacent to Brownsville.

By 15, as a Uniontown resident, he began training and competing in earnest for the Uniontown YMCA. In an interview in 1960, Wyatt claimed Fred L. Brothers, former local D.A. of Fayette County, where he grew up, taught him the backstroke. He was also assisted in his stroke development by Dr. Herman Heise, of Uniontown Hospital, a former college swimmer and YMCA coach who recognized Wyatt's potential. In important early competition in 1923, he had his first major victory in Pennsylvania's Johnstown at the Junior Nationals, capturing a third place in the backstroke. In 1924 he won the Junior National championship for the backstroke in Atlantic City, New Jersey.

Wyatt went to Grammar school and High School in Brownsville, but in 1924 graduated from the Uniontown Area High School. He would study at the University of Pittsburgh and Northwestern University in Evanston, Illinois and attend Victor X-Ray School in Chicago.

== Olympics ==
After participating in the Olympic swimming trails in Indianapolis, Wyatt captured a place on the U.S. Olympic swimming team in the backstroke. After making it through the qualifying heats in Paris, he became part of the 1924 U.S. Swimming team men's finalists.

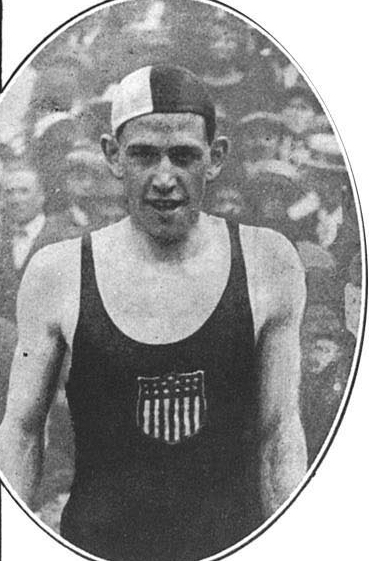
Wyatt in Olympic suit

In the Paris Olympics on July 18, 1924, Wyatt won a silver medal in the finals of the men's 100-meter backstroke event with a time of 1:15.4 with fellow American Warren Kealoha placing first with a 1:13.2. An exceptional competitor in the 100 backstroke, Kealoha would break the world record in the event six times. Hungarian Karoly Bartha took third in the event with a 1:17.8. Wyatt had formerly swum a 1:19.4 in the third preliminary heat and a 1:17.0 in the first heat of the semi-finals to qualify for the finals. Led by Men's Olympic Head Coach Bill Bachrach, the 1924 U.S. Olympic Swimming team dominated the Olympic sport, winning 19 of a potential 33 medals. The 1924 U.S. Olympic team included Chicagoan Johnny Weissmuller a triple gold medalist, Hawaiians Duke and Samuel Kahanamoku, and 200-meter breaststroker Bob Skelton. 1924 U.S. Men's Olympic Head Coach Bill Bachrach had coached both Weissmuller and Skelton in Chicago.

Wyatt qualified in backstroke again at the 1928 U.S. swimming trials in Detroit. At the 1928 Amsterdam Olympics, with the U.S. Men's team again managed by Hall of Fame Coach Bill Bachrach, Wyatt won a bronze medal in the 100-meter backstroke with a time of 1:12.0 for his third-place finish. The Americans swept the event finals with George Kojac winning the gold with a time of 1:08.2, and Walter Laufer capturing the silver with a time of 1:10.0.

Wyatt had a high point in his swimming career, attending the 1928 coronation of Emperor Hirohito of Japan with American swimming champion and Olympic gold medalist Johnny Weissmuller, backstroke silver medalist Walter Laufer, and American championship diver Helen Meany. While in Japan, he participated in a swimming exhibition with other members of the American team.

Competing between his two Olympic victories, Wyatt captured the 1925 AAU indoor backstroke championship in San Francisco, and was subsequently the 1926 AAU outdoor champion at the Sesquicentennial Celebration in Philadelphia.

== Post swimming career ==
After retiring from his swimming career around 1928, Wyatt served as a lab technician first at Uniontown Hospital, later working twenty-three years beginning around the early 1930's at the laboratory and X-ray department at Brownsville Hospital, eventually growing his responsibilities as a biochemist.

=== Marriage ===
At 39, having worked as a lab tech at Brownsville Hospital for over a decade, Wyatt married Juanita Knuth on the evening of Friday, October 18, 1946 at St. Peters R.C. Church in Brownsville. Juanita's mother had worked as Superintendent and accountant at Brownsville Hospital, where Paul Wyatt would spend twenty years of his career as an X-ray and lab tech. Paul's wife Juanita worked as a Director of Education and instructed Science at Brownsville General Hospital beginning in 1934. According to Juanita, the couple met initially when Paul first began work at Brownsville General as an X-ray technician and had known each other around fifteen years before marrying. Juanita had attended Cincinnati's Good Samaritan Hospital of Nursing, graduating in 1929. She received her B.S. from Cincinnati's Mt. St. Joseph College in 1931. She attended Colorado's Greely State's Teacher's College, working towards a Master's. Wyatt later took the middle name "Knuth", as a tribute to his wife Juanita's maiden name.

Wyatt spoke at the Sports Banquet of his accomplished club, the Uniontown YMCA on April 8, 1954.

Paul and Juanita lived much of their married life in Coal Center, Pennsylvania, just five miles North of Brownsville, Pennsylvania, where they both worked.

=== Work as medical tech in Nevada ===
In 1954, Wyatt relocated to Nevada and took up lab work at the hospital at Ely in East Central Nevada, working there a little over a year. He then set up his own lab at Nevada's capital, Carson City around 1956, later moving the lab to Zephry Cove. As a biochemist working with his own lab in Nevada, in addition to his knowledge of X-ray technology, he did a broader range of biomedical lab work for the State of Nevada, and served on the Board of the National Safety Council's Drugs and Alcohol Committee. His work with the Drugs and Alcohol Committee included analyzing intoxication testing to help enact legislation to reduce highway accidents caused by intoxicated drivers. Working with the National Safety Council, he also compiled Nevada accident records to determine the relationship of drinking to the cause of the accidents, and sought mandatory testing for drivers suspected of driving while drinking. While in Carson City in 1957, Wyatt helped arrange a course and program in parasitology as part of his role as Committee Chairman for the Nevada Association of Medical Technicians.

Wyatt's wife Juanita followed him to Nevada, working first as a supervisor at Steptoe Valley Hospital in Ely from 1955-56, then serving as a supervisor two years at Tahoe Hospital, in Carson City, Nevada, before leaving in 1958. From 1958-1961, she worked in Doctor T.V. Ross office in Gardenerville, Nevada. Returning to the Brownsville area around 1963, she served from 1966-76 as a coordinator for the Vocational Technical Practical Nursing Program for Fayette County before retiring. Paul and Juanita's son Thomas lived in Ely, Nevada at least through 1960, and later in Carson City. Paul and his wife Juanita returned to the Brownsville area in 1963.

Wyatt died on December 15, 1970, at Brownsville General Hospital in Brownsville, Pennsylvania, where he and his wife had worked and met. He was hospitalized in May, 1970 at Pittsburgh's Shadyside Hospital. Exposure to certain chemicals and X-radiation has been linked by a few studies to certain forms of lymphoma, Wyatt's cause of death, but the findings are considered inconclusive. He was survived by his wife, Edith Knuth Wyatt, a son Thomas of Nevada's Carson City, a brother Frank, and grandchildren. Memorial services were held at St. Thomas Aquinus Church on 409 Union Street in nearby California, Pennsylvania very close to where the Wyatts had resided. Paul Wyatt was buried at the Lafayette Memorial Park near Brownsville, as would be his wife Juanita in 2001.

=== Honors ===
Riverfront Park, adjacent to the Monongahela River, in Pennsylvania's California Borough, very near where Paul and Juanita Wyatt lived for many years, was renamed the Paul H. Wyatt Riverfront Park in Paul Wyatt's honor in 1984. As noted earlier, Paul Wyatt spent much of his life in Brownsville, and swam as a youngster in the adjacent Monongahela River.

== See also ==
- List of Olympic medalists in swimming (men)
