= Swimming at the 1924 Summer Olympics – Men's 100 metre backstroke =

Men's 100 metre backstroke at the Games of the VIII Olympiad
- Date: 16 July 1924 (heats); 17 July 1924 (semifinals); 18 July 1924 (finals)
- Competitors: 20 from 11 nations
- Winning time: 1:13.2 OR

Medalists
1st place, gold medalist(s)		Warren Kealoha	United States
2nd place, silver medalist(s)		Paul Wyatt	United States
3rd place, bronze medalist(s)		Károly Bartha	Hungary

The men's 100 metre backstroke was a swimming event held as part of the swimming at the 1924 Summer Olympics programme. It was the fourth appearance of the event, which was established in 1908. The competition was held on Wednesday July 16, 1924, on Thursday July 17, 1924, and on Friday July 18, 1924.

== Records ==
These were the standing world and Olympic records (in minutes) prior to the 1924 Summer Olympics.

World record	1:12.4	(United States) Warren Kealoha	Honolulu (USA)	April 13, 1924
Olympic record	1:14.8	(United States) Warren Kealoha	Antwerp (BEL)	August 22, 1920

In the first heat Warren Kealoha set a new Olympic record with 1:13.4 minutes. In the final he bettered his own record to 1:13.2 minutes.

== Results ==
=== Heats ===
Wednesday July 16, 1924: The fastest two in each heat and the fastest third-placed from across the heats advanced.

Heat 1

Place	Swimmer	Time	Qual.
1	Warren Kealoha (USA)	1:13.4	QQ OR
2	Gérard Blitz (BEL)	1:19.0	QQ
3	James Worthington (GBR)	1:23.2	qq
4	Maurice Ducos (FRA)	1:25.0	

Heat 2

Place	Swimmer	Time	Qual.
1	Károly Bartha (HUN)	1:18.0	QQ
2	John McDowall (GBR)	1:21.8	QQ
3	Aart van Wilgenburg (NED)	1:24.6	
4	Tsunenobu Ishida (JPN)	1:26.0	
5	Georges Paulus (FRA)	1:28.0	
—	Henry Luning (USA)	DSQ	

Heat 3

Place	Swimmer	Time	Qual.
1	Paul Wyatt (USA)	1:19.4	QQ
2	Émile Zeibig (FRA)	1:22.4	QQ
3	Jean-Pierre Moris (LUX)	1:41.2	

Heat 4

Place	Swimmer	Time	Qual.
1	Austin Rawlinson (GBR)	1:18.8	QQ
2	Giyo Saito (JPN)	1:20.2	QQ
3	Pieter van Senus (NED)	1:24.8	

Heat 5

Place	Swimmer	Time	Qual.
1	Sven Thaulow (NOR)	1:24.0	QQ
2	Erik Skoglund (SWE)	1:27.4	QQ
3	Viktor Légat (TCH)	1:27.8	
4	Eugène Kuborn (LUX)	1:29.0	

=== Semifinals ===
Thursday July 17, 1924: The fastest two in each semi-final and the faster of the two third-placed swimmer advanced to the final.

Semifinal 1

Place	Swimmer	Time	Qual.
1	Warren Kealoha (USA)	1:13.6	QF
2	Paul Wyatt (USA)	1:17.0	QF
3	Károly Bartha (HUN)	1:19.0	qf
4	Giyo Saito (JPN)	1:19.8	
5	John McDowall (GBR)	1:22.0	
6	Erik Skoglund (SWE)	1:26.6	

Semifinal 2

Place	Swimmer	Time	Qual.
1	Gérard Blitz (BEL)	1:19.0	QF
2	Austin Rawlinson (GBR)	1:19.2	QF
3	Émile Zeibig (FRA)	1:23.4	
4	James Worthington (GBR)	1:24.2	
5	Sven Thaulow (NOR)	1:24.2	

=== Final ===
Friday July 18, 1924:

Place	Swimmer	Time
1	Warren Kealoha (USA)	1:13.2 OR
2	Paul Wyatt (USA)	1:15.4
3	Károly Bartha (HUN)	1:17.8
4	Gérard Blitz (BEL)	1:19.6
5	Austin Rawlinson (GBR)	1:20.0
