= Swimming at the 1924 Summer Olympics – Men's 100 metre freestyle =

Men's 100 metre freestyle at the Games of the VIII Olympiad
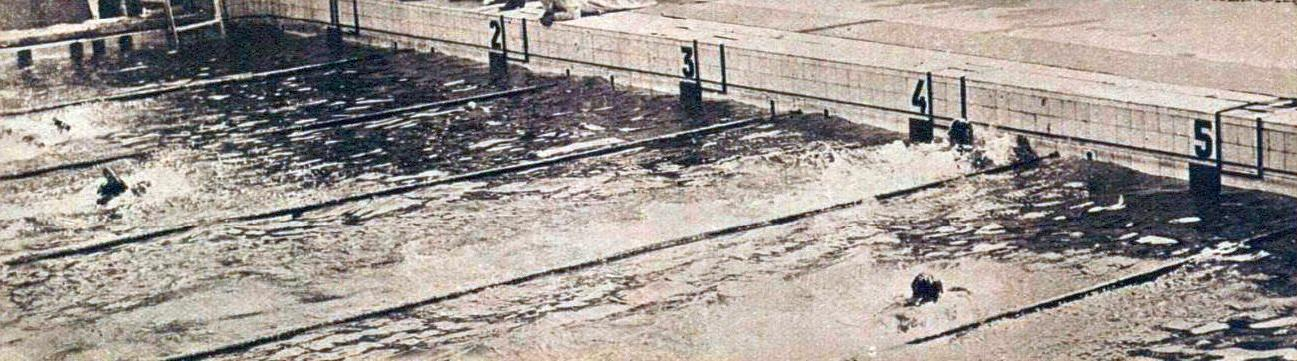
- Finish of the final. Weissmuller is in lane 4, D. Kahanamoku in lane 5.
- Venue: Piscine des Tourelles
- Date: 19 July 1924 (heats & semifinals); 20 July 1924 (final)
- Competitors: 30 from 15 nations
- Winning time: 59.0 OR

Medalists
1st place, gold medalist(s)		Johnny Weissmuller; United States
2nd place, silver medalist(s)		Duke Kahanamoku; United States
3rd place, bronze medalist(s)		Samuel Kahanamoku; United States

The men's 100 metre freestyle was a swimming event held as part of the swimming at the 1924 Summer Olympics programme. It was the sixth appearance of the event, which had not been featured at the 1900 Games. The competition was held on Saturday July 19, 1924 and on Sunday July 20, 1924. There were 30 competitors from 15 nations. Nations were limited to three swimmers each, down from four in 1920. The United States swept the medals for the second consecutive Games, winning its fourth consecutive gold medal. Johnny Weissmuller beat two-time defending champion Duke Kahanamoku in the final. Kahanamoku was the first man to win three medals in the event. His brother Samuel Kahanamoku earned the bronze medal.

== Background ==
This was the sixth appearance of the men's 100 metre freestyle. The event has been held at every Summer Olympics except 1900 (when the shortest freestyle was the 200 metres), though the 1904 version was measured in yards rather than metres.

One of the five finalists from 1920 returned: two-time gold medalist Duke Kahanamoku of the United States. American Johnny Weissmuller, the world record holder in the event, was a heavy favorite in the event. His teammates, Duke and Samuel Kahanamoku, were also strong contenders.

Argentina, Spain, and Yugoslavia each made their debut in the event. The United States made its sixth appearance, having competed at each edition of the event to date.

== Competition format ==
The competition used a three-round (quarterfinals, semifinals, final) format. The advancement rule was the one used since 1912; for each round before the final, the top two in each heat plus the fastest third-place swimmer would advance. There were 6 quarterfinals of between 4 and 6 swimmers, allowing 13 swimmers to advance to the semifinals. The 2 semifinals had 6 or 7 swimmers; 5 advanced to the final.

Each race involved two lengths of the 50-metre pool.

== Records ==
These were the standing world and Olympic records (in minutes) prior to the 1924 Summer Olympics.

World record	Johnny Weissmuller (USA)	57.4	Miami, United States	17 February 1924
Olympic record	Duke Kahanamoku (USA)	1:00.4	Antwerp, Belgium	24 August 1920

In the second semifinal Johnny Weissmuller set a new Olympic record with 1:00.8 minutes. In the final he bettered his record with a time of 59.0 seconds.

== Schedule ==
Date	Time	Round
Saturday, 19 July 1924	10:00; 15:00	Heats; Semifinals
Sunday, 20 July 1924	15:00	Final

== Results ==
=== Heats ===
The fastest two in each heat and the fastest third-placed from across the heats advanced.

==== Heat 1 ====
Rank	Swimmer	Nation	Time	Notes
1	Orvar Trolle	Sweden	1:04.2	Q
2	Duke Kahanamoku	United States	1:04.2	Q
3	Kazuo Onoda	Japan	1:05.4	
4	Charles Baillee	Great Britain	1:08.2	
5	Vlado Smokvina	Yugoslavia	1:11.6	

==== Heat 2 ====
Rank	Swimmer	Nation	Time	Notes
1	Samuel Kahanamoku	United States	1:03.2	Q
2	Ernest Henry	Australia	1:03.8	Q
3	Torahiko Miyahata	Japan	1:04.2	q
4	Henri Padou	France	1:05.0	
5	Albert Dickin	Great Britain	1:06.0	
6	Stanislav Bičák	Czechoslovakia	1:10.2	

==== Heat 3 ====
Rank	Swimmer	Nation	Time	Notes
1	Clayton Bourne	Canada	1:06.2	Q
2	Alberto Zorrilla	Argentina	1:08.2	Q
3	Viktor Legát	Czechoslovakia	1:13.2	
4	Charles Kopp	Switzerland	1:15.0	

==== Heat 4 ====
Rank	Swimmer	Nation	Time	Notes
1	Katsuo Takaishi	Japan	1:04.0	Q
2	Ivan Stedman	Australia	1:06.0	Q
3	Georg Werner	Sweden	1:07.0	
4	Émile Zeibig	France	1:08.0	
5	Gé Dekker	Netherlands	1:11.8	

==== Heat 5 ====
Rank	Swimmer	Nation	Time	Notes
1	Johnny Weissmuller	United States	1:03.8	Q
2	Alfred Harold Pycock	Great Britain	1:05.2	Q
3	Édouard Vanzeveren	France	1:06.8	
4	Moss Christie	Australia	1:07.2	
5	José Manuel Pinillo	Spain	1:14.2	

==== Heat 6 ====
Rank	Swimmer	Nation	Time	Notes
1	Arne Borg	Sweden	1:05.4	Q
2	István Bárány	Hungary	1:08.4	Q
3	Július Baláž	Czechoslovakia	1:11.8	
4	Dionysios Vasilopoulos	Greece	1:12.0	
5	Pieter Jacobszoon	Netherlands	1:12.2	

=== Semifinals ===
The fastest two in each semi-final and the faster of the two third-placed swimmer advanced to the final.

==== Semifinal 1 ====
Rank	Swimmer	Nation	Time	Notes
1	Duke Kahanamoku	United States	1:01.6	Q
2	Samuel Kahanamoku	United States	1:02.2	Q
3	Katsuo Takaishi	Japan	1:02.4	q
4	Orvar Trolle	Sweden	1:02.6	
5	Clayton Bourne	Canada	1:06.0	
6	István Bárány	Hungary	1:08.0	
—	Torahiko Miyahata	Japan	DNS	

==== Semifinal 2 ====
Rank	Swimmer	Nation	Time	Notes
1	Johnny Weissmuller	United States	1:00.8	Q, OR
2	Arne Borg	Sweden	1:02.6	Q
3	Ernest Henry	Australia	1:03.0	
4	Alfred Harold Pycock	Great Britain	1:05.0	
5	Ivan Stedman	Australia	1:06.0	
6	Alberto Zorrilla	Argentina	1:07.6	

=== Final ===
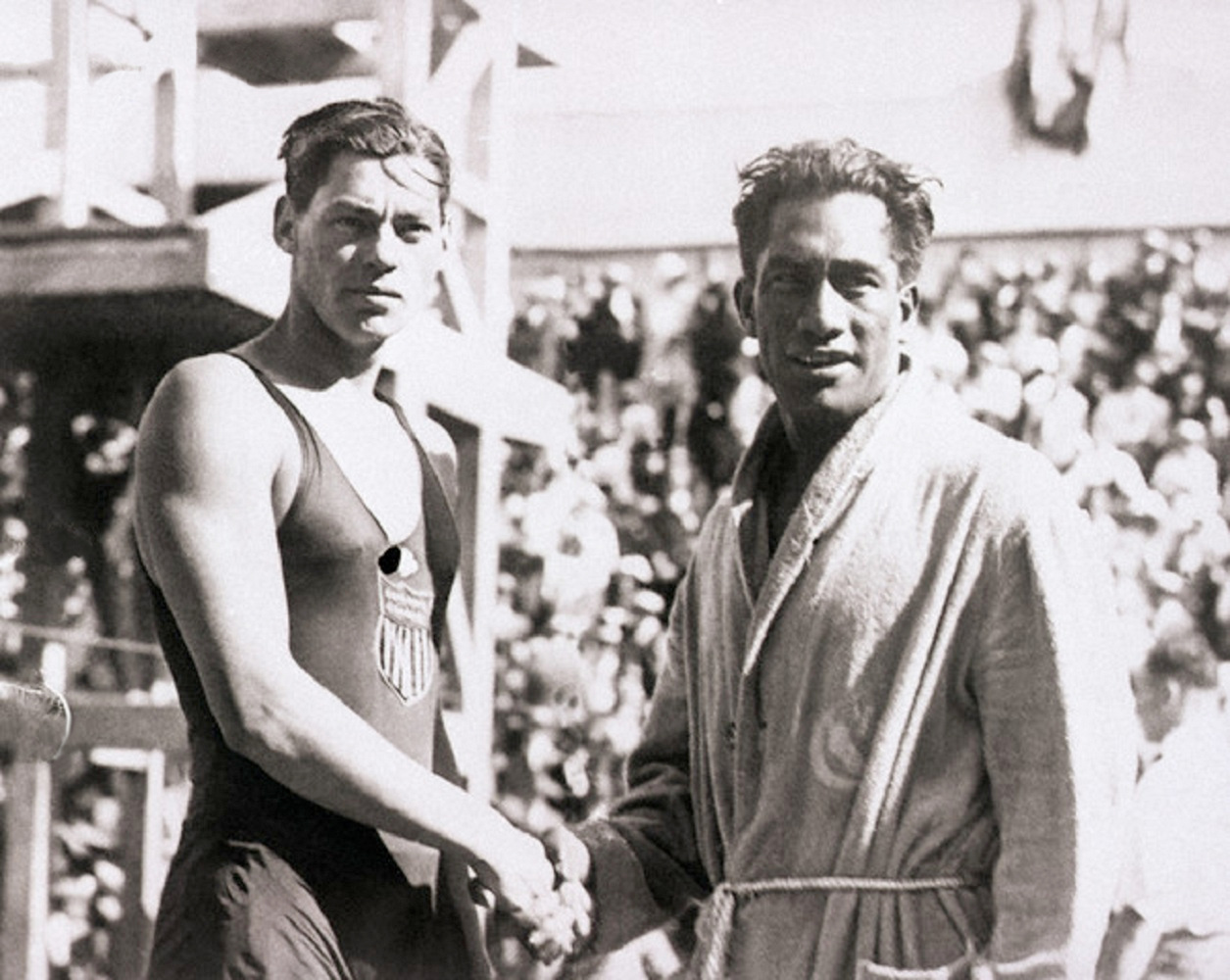
Weissmuller and Kahanamoku shaking hands after the final

Rank	Swimmer	Nation	Time	Notes
1st place, gold medalist(s)	Johnny Weissmuller	United States	59.0	OR
2nd place, silver medalist(s)	Duke Kahanamoku	United States	1:01.4	
3rd place, bronze medalist(s)	Samuel Kahanamoku	United States	1:01.8	
4	Arne Borg	Sweden	1:02.0	
5	Katsuo Takaishi	Japan	1:03.0	

== Results summary ==
Rank	Swimmer	Nation	Heats	Semifinals	Final	Notes
1st place, gold medalist(s)	Johnny Weissmuller	United States	1:03.8	1:00.8	59.0	OR
2nd place, silver medalist(s)	Duke Kahanamoku	United States	1:04.2	1:01.6	1:01.4	
3rd place, bronze medalist(s)	Samuel Kahanamoku	United States	1:03.2	1:02.2	1:01.8	
4	Arne Borg	Sweden	1:05.4	1:02.6	1:02.0	
5	Katsuo Takaishi	Japan	1:04.0	1:02.4	1:03.0	
6	Orvar Trolle	Sweden	1:04.2	1:02.6	Did not advance	
7	Ernest Henry	Australia	1:03.8	1:03.0	Did not advance	
8	Alfred Harold Pycock	Great Britain	1:05.2	1:05.0	Did not advance	
9	Clayton Bourne	Canada	1:06.2	1:06.0	Did not advance	
9	Ivan Stedman	Australia	1:06.0	1:06.0	Did not advance	
11	Alberto Zorrilla	Argentina	1:08.2	1:07.6	Did not advance	
12	István Bárány	Hungary	1:08.4	1:08.0	Did not advance	
13	Torahiko Miyahata	Japan	1:04.2	DNS	Did not advance	
14	Henri Padou	France	1:05.0	did not advance		
15	Kazuo Onoda	Japan	1:05.4	did not advance		
16	Albert Dickin	Great Britain	1:06.0	did not advance		
17	Édouard Vanzeveren	France	1:06.8	did not advance		
18	Georg Werner	Sweden	1:07.0	did not advance		
19	Moss Christie	Australia	1:07.2	did not advance		
20	Émile Zeibig	France	1:08.0	did not advance		
21	Charles Baillee	Great Britain	1:08.2	did not advance		
22	Stanislav Bičák	Czechoslovakia	1:10.2	did not advance		
23	Vlado Smokvina	Yugoslavia	1:11.6	did not advance		
24	Július Baláž	Czechoslovakia	1:11.8	did not advance		
25	Gé Dekker	Netherlands	1:11.8	did not advance		
26	Dionysios Vasilopoulos	Greece	1:12.0	did not advance		
27	Pieter Jacobszoon	Netherlands	1:12.2	did not advance		
28	Viktor Legát	Czechoslovakia	1:13.2	did not advance		
29	José Manuel Pinillo	Spain	1:14.2	did not advance		
30	Charles Kopp	Switzerland	1:15.0	did not advance		
