= Swimming at the 1928 Summer Olympics – Men's 100 metre backstroke =

Men's 100 metre backstroke at the Games of the IX Olympiad
- Venue: Olympic Sports Park Swim Stadium
- Date: 7 August 1928 (heats); 8 August 1928 (semifinals); 9 August 1928 (final)
- Competitors: 19 from 12 nations
- Winning time: 1:08.2 WR

Medalists
| 1st place, gold medalist(s) | | George Kojac | United States |
| 2nd place, silver medalist(s) | | Walter Laufer | United States |
| 3rd place, bronze medalist(s) | | Paul Wyatt | United States |

The men's 100 metre backstroke was a swimming event held as part of the swimming at the 1928 Summer Olympics programme. It was the fifth appearance of the event, which was established in 1908. The competition was held from Tuesday to Thursday, 7 to 9 August 1928.

Nineteen swimmers from twelve nations competed.

== Records ==
These were the standing world and Olympic records (in minutes) prior to the 1928 Summer Olympics.

| World record | 1:09.0 | (United States) George Kojac | Detroit (U.S.) | 23 June 1928 |
| Olympic record | 1:13.2 | (United States) Warren Kealoha | Paris (FRA) | 18 July 1924 |

In the first heat George Kojac set a new Olympic record with 1:09.2 minutes. In the final he set a new world record with 1:08.2 minutes.

== Results ==
=== Heats ===
Tuesday 7 August 1928: The fastest two in each heat and the fastest third-placed from across the heats advanced. As there was a tie for second place in the fifth heat both swimmers advanced instead of a third placed.

==== Heat 1 ====
| Rank | Swimmer | Nation | Time | Notes |
|---|---|---|---|---|
| 1 | George Kojac | United States | 1:09.2 | Q, OR |
| 2 | Toshio Irie | Japan | 1:13.4 | Q |
| 3 | Albert Schumberg | Germany | 1:16.6 | |
| 4 | Roland Johansson | Sweden | 1:17.4 | |

==== Heat 2 ====
| Rank | Swimmer | Nation | Time | Notes |
|---|---|---|---|---|
| 1 | Walter Laufer | United States | 1:12.8 | Q |
| 2 | John Besford | Great Britain | 1:15.0 | Q |
| 3 | Aladár Bitskey | Hungary | 1:15.6 | |
| 4 | Johann Schulz | Germany | 1:17.2 | |

==== Heat 3 ====
| Rank | Swimmer | Nation | Time | Notes |
|---|---|---|---|---|
| 1 | Tom Boast | Australia | 1:17.0 | Q |
| 2 | Gérard Blitz | Belgium | 1:18.8 | Q |
| 3 | Len Moorhouse | New Zealand | 1:20.4 | |

==== Heat 4 ====
| Rank | Swimmer | Nation | Time | Notes |
|---|---|---|---|---|
| 1 | Ernst Küppers | Germany | 1:14.0 | Q |
| 2 | Willie Francis | Great Britain | 1:16.4 | Q |
| 3 | Émile Zeibig | France | 1:20.0 | |
| 4 | Eugène Kuborn | Luxembourg | Unknown | |

==== Heat 5 ====
| Rank | Swimmer | Nation | Time | Notes |
|---|---|---|---|---|
| 1 | Paul Wyatt | United States | 1:14.0 | Q |
| 2 | Eskil Lundahl | Sweden | 1:14.4 | Q |
| 2 | Munroe Bourne | Canada | 1:14.4 | |
| 4 | Shourai Kimura | Japan | Unknown | |

=== Semifinals ===
Wednesday 8 August 1928: The fastest three in each semi-final advanced.

==== Semifinal 1 ====
| Rank | Swimmer | Nation | Time | Notes |
|---|---|---|---|---|
| 1 | George Kojac | United States | 1:10.0 | Q |
| 2 | Toshio Irie | Japan | 1:14.0 | Q |
| 3 | John Besford | Great Britain | 1:14.8 | Q |
| 4 | Munroe Bourne | Canada | Unknown | |
| 5 | Eskil Lundahl | Sweden | Unknown | |
| 6 | Willie Francis | Great Britain | Unknown | |

==== Semifinal 2 ====
| Rank | Swimmer | Nation | Time | Notes |
|---|---|---|---|---|
| 1 | Walter Laufer | United States | 1:12.6 | Q |
| 2 | Paul Wyatt | United States | 1:14.2 | Q |
| 2 | Ernst Küppers | Germany | 1:14.2 | Q |
| 4 | Tom Boast | Australia | Unknown | |
| — | Gérard Blitz | Belgium | DNS | |

=== Final ===
Thursday 9 August 1928:

| Rank | Swimmer | Nation | Time | Notes |
|---|---|---|---|---|
| 1st place, gold medalist(s) | George Kojac | United States | 1:08.2 | WR |
| 2nd place, silver medalist(s) | Walter Laufer | United States | 1:10.0 | |
| 3rd place, bronze medalist(s) | Paul Wyatt | United States | 1:12.0 | |
| 4 | Toshio Irie | Japan | 1:13.6 | |
| 5 | Ernst Küppers | Germany | 1:13.8 | |
| 6 | John Besford | Great Britain | 1:15.4 | |
