= Swimming at the 1932 Summer Olympics – Men's 100 metre backstroke =

Men's 100 metre backstroke at the Games of the X Olympiad
- Venue: LA84 Foundation/John C. Argue Swim Stadium
- Dates: August 10, 1932 (heats); August 11, 1932 (semifinals); August 12, 1932 (final)
- Competitors: 16 from 9 nations
- Winning time: 1:08.6

Medalists
1st place, gold medalist(s)		Masaji Kiyokawa; Japan
2nd place, silver medalist(s)		Toshio Irie; Japan
3rd place, bronze medalist(s)		Kentaro Kawatsu; Japan

The men's 100 metre backstroke was a swimming event held as part of the swimming at the 1932 Summer Olympics programme. It was the sixth appearance of the event, which was established in 1908. The competition was held from Wednesday August 10, 1932 to Friday August 12, 1932.

Sixteen swimmers from nine nations competed.

== Records ==
These were the standing world and Olympic records (in minutes) prior to the 1932 Summer Olympics.

World record	1:08.2	(United States) George Kojac	Amsterdam (NED)	August 9, 1928
Olympic record	1:08.2	(United States) George Kojac	Amsterdam (NED)	August 9, 1928

== Results ==
=== Heats ===
Wednesday August 10, 1932: The fastest two in each heat and the fastest third-placed from across the heats advanced to the final.

Heat 1

Place	Swimmer	Time	Qual.
1	Masaji Kiyokawa (JPN)	1:08.9	QQ
2	Robert Kerber (USA)	1:13.0	QQ
3	Robert Halloran (CAN)	1:14.2	
4	Eskil Lundahl (SWE)	1:16.4	

Heat 2

Place	Swimmer	Time	Qual.
1	Dan Zehr (USA)	1:09.9	QQ
2	Ernst Küppers (GER)	1:10.2	QQ
3	Kentaro Kawatsu (JPN)	1:10.9	qq
4	Willie Francis (GBR)	1:12.9	
5	Benvenuto Nunes (BRA)	1:21.0	

Heat 3

Place	Swimmer	Time	Qual.
1	Toshio Irie (JPN)	1:11.3	QQ
2	Munroe Bourne (CAN)	1:14.3	QQ
3	Jorge de Paula (BRA)	1:29.2	
4	Marcel Noual (FRA)	DSQ	

Heat 4

Place	Swimmer	Time	Qual.
1	William Karlsen (NOR)	1:13.7	QQ
2	Gordon Chalmers (USA)	1:17.2	QQ
3	Dennis Walker (CAN)	1:21.0	

=== Semifinals ===
Thursday August 11, 1932: The fastest three in each semi-final advanced to the final.

Semifinal 1

Place	Swimmer	Time	Qual.
1	Masaji Kiyokawa (JPN)	1:09.0	QQ
2	Ernst Küppers (GER)	1:09.8	QQ
3	Kentaro Kawatsu (JPN)	1:10.2	QQ
4	Gordon Chalmers (USA)	1:11.6	
5	William Karlsen (NOR)	1:13.3	

Semifinal 2

Place	Swimmer	Time	Qual.
1	Toshio Irie (JPN)	1:10.9	QQ
2	Dan Zehr (USA)	1:11.6	QQ
3	Robert Kerber (USA)	1:13.0	QQ
4	Munroe Bourne (CAN)	1:13.9	

=== Final ===
Friday August 12, 1932: Ernst Küppers who seems to be the main rival of the Japanese swimmers committed a false start, maybe this was the reason why he was only able to finish fifth.

Place	Swimmer	Time
1	Masaji Kiyokawa (JPN)	1:08.6
2	Toshio Irie (JPN)	1:09.8
3	Kentaro Kawatsu (JPN)	1:10.0
4	Dan Zehr (USA)	1:10.9
5	Ernst Küppers (GER)	1:11.3
6	Robert Kerber (USA)	1:12.8
