= Norway at the 1932 Summer Olympics =

- IOC code: NOR
- NOC: Norwegian National Federation of Sports

in Los Angeles
- Competitors: 7 in 4 sports
- Flag bearer: Olav Sunde (athletics)
- Medals: Gold 0 Silver 0 Bronze 0 Total 0

Summer Olympics appearances (overview)
- 1900; 1904; 1908; 1912; 1920; 1924; 1928; 1932; 1936; 1948; 1952; 1956; 1960; 1964; 1968; 1972; 1976; 1980; 1984; 1988; 1992; 1996; 2000; 2004; 2008; 2012; 2016; 2020; 2024

Other related appearances
- 1906 Intercalated Games

Norway competed at the 1932 Summer Olympics in Los Angeles, United States. It was the first time that no Norwegian athletes won any medals at the Games.

== Swimming ==
Men

Athlete	Event	Heat		Semifinal		Final	
Athlete	Event	Time	Rank	Time	Rank	Time	Rank
William Karlsen	100 m backstroke	1:13.7	8 Q	1:13.3	8	Did not advance	
