= James Worthington =

James Worthington may refer to:

- Jimmy Worthington, British swimmer
- James Worthington (rugby league), English rugby league footballer
