= Zeibig =

Zeibig is a German surname. Notable people with the surname include:

- Emil Zeibig (1901–1981), French Olympic swimmer
- Steffen Zeibig (born 1977), German Paralympic equestrian
