= Boast (surname) =

Boast is a surname. Notable people with the surname include:

- Rachael Boast (born 1975), British poet
- Robin Boast (born 1956), American academic and former curator
- Russell Boast (born 1972), South African and American casting director
- Tom Boast (1905–1988), Australian swimmer
