= Torahiko =

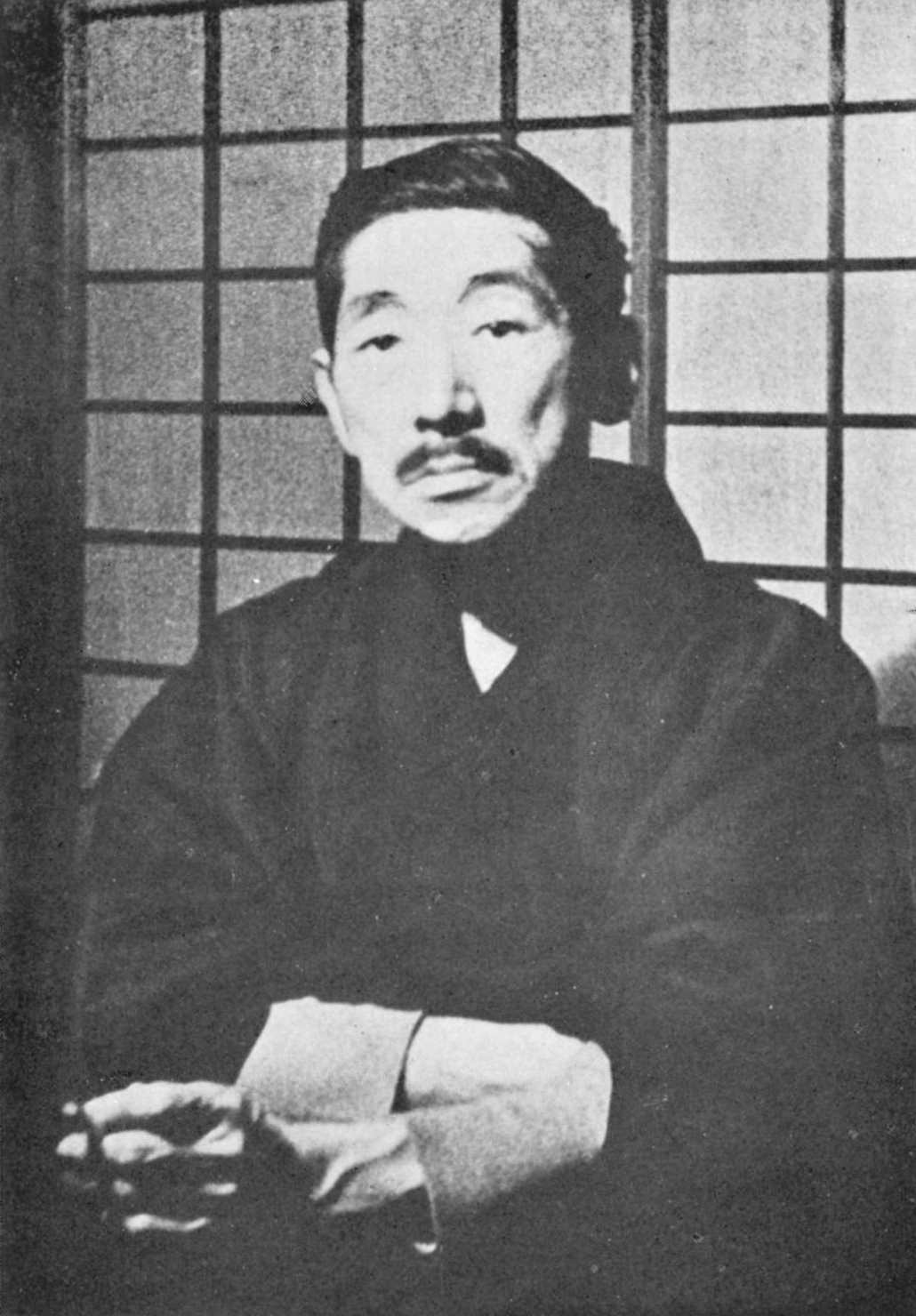
- Torahiko Terada (1878–1935), Japanese physicist and writer
- Pronunciation: toɾaçiko (IPA)
- Gender: Male

Origin
- Origin: Japanese
- Meaning: Different meanings depending on the kanji used

Torahiko is a masculine Japanese given name.

== Written forms ==
Torahiko can be written using different combinations of kanji characters. Some examples:

- 虎彦, "tiger, elegant boy"
- 虎比古, "tiger, young man (archaic)"
- 寅彦, "sign of the tiger (Chinese zodiac), elegant boy"
- 寅比古, "sign of the tiger (Chinese zodiac), young man (archaic)"

The name can also be written in hiragana とらひこ or katakana トラヒコ.

== Notable people with the name ==
- Torahiko Miyahata (宮畑 虎彦; 1903–1988), Japanese swimmer
- Torahiko Tanaka (田中 寅彦; born 1957), Japanese shogi player
- Torahiko Terada (寺田 寅彦; 1878–1935), Japanese physicist and writer

== See also ==
- 6514 Torahiko, a main-belt asteroid
