= Boast (disambiguation) =

Boasting is speaking with excessive pride.

Boast may also refer to:

- Boast (surname)
- Boast, a shot in the game of squash that hits a sidewall or backwall before hitting the front wall
- "Boast", a track by Collective Soul from the album Blender
- "Boasty", a 2019 song by Wiley, Stefflon Don and Sean Paul featuring Idris Elba

== See also ==
- Coslédaà-Lube-Boast, a commune in south-western France
