= Toshio Irie =

Japanese swimmer (1911–1974)

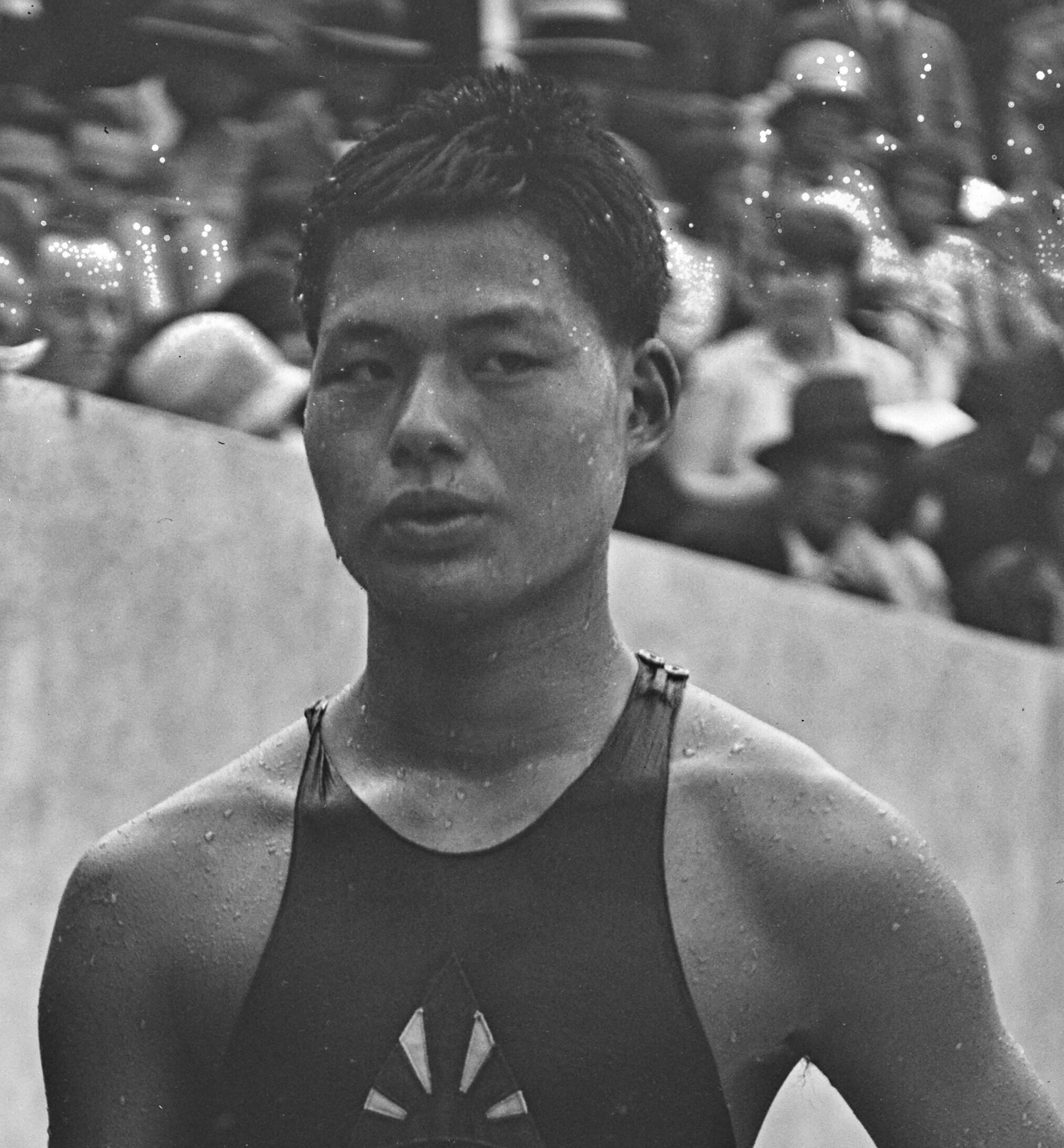

Personal information
- Full name: 入江 稔夫
- National team: Japan
- Born: 5 November 1911 Takatsuki, Osaka, Japan
- Died: 8 May 1974 (aged 62)

Sport
- Sport: Swimming
- Strokes: Backstroke
Medal record
Men's swimming
Representing Japan
Olympic Games
Silver medal – second place	1932 Los Angeles	100 m backstroke

Toshio Irie (入江 稔夫; November 5, 1911 – May 8, 1974) was a Japanese swimmer.

Irie was born in Takatsuki, Osaka, and graduated from the Engineering Department of Waseda University. He finished fourth in the 100 m backstroke at the 1928 Summer Olympics. Later that year, on October 14, 1928, he set a new world record in the 200 m at 2 minutes 37.8 seconds. At the 1932 Summer Olympics, Irie won the silver medal in the 100 m backstroke, with teammates Masaji Kiyokawa and Kentaro Kawatsu taking the gold and bronze.

Records
Preceded by Walter Laufer	Men's 200 metres backstroke world record-holder 14 October 1928 – 16 June 1930	Succeeded by George Kojac
