= Jean-Pierre Moris =

Luxembourgish swimmer

Personal information
- Born: 7 June 1903 Pétange, Luxembourg
- Died: 31 January 1985 (aged 81) Pétange, Luxembourg

Sport
- Sport: Swimming

Jean-Pierre Moris (7 June 1903 – 31 January 1985) was a Luxembourgish swimmer. He competed in the men's 100 metre backstroke event at the 1924 Summer Olympics.
