= Alfred Pycock =

British swimmer

Personal information
- Full name: Alfred Harold Pycock
- Born: 12 May 1900 Fulham, London, England
- Died: 13 March 1964 (aged 63) St Leonards-on-Sea, England

Sport
- Sport: Swimming

Alfred Pycock (12 May 1900 – 13 March 1964) was a British swimmer. He competed in the men's 100 metre freestyle event at the 1924 Summer Olympics.

Activities during WW2 - Alfred was granted the rank of Major, and served with the Royal Ordnance Corps, during this service he was captured by Japanese forces where he became a prisoner of war. He was later awarded an M.B.E. for his efforts during his time as a prisoner.
