= Henry Luning =

American swimmer

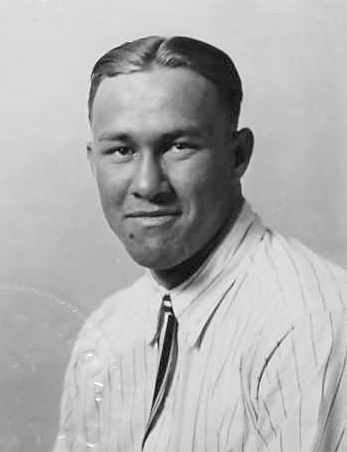
- 1924 passport photo of Luning, his Olympic year

Personal information
- Full name: Henry K. Luning Sr.
- National team: United States
- Born: January 24, 1905 Honolulu, Hawaii
- Died: September 13, 1965 (aged 60) Honolulu, Hawaii
- Education: St. Louis School (1925); Competed in swimming
- Spouse: Daisey Helenihi (m. 1926)
- Children: Around 3

Sport
- Sport: Swimming
- Strokes: Backstroke
- Club: Hui Makami Club
- Coach: Harvey Chilton (Hui Makami); Bill Bachrach (Olympics)

Henry Kalahanohano Luning Sr. (January 24, 1905 – September 13, 1965) was an American competition swimmer who competed for Honolulu's Hui Makami Club and the St. Louis School and represented the United States as a 19-year-old at the 1924 Summer Olympics in Paris. He swam a 1:16.4 in the 100-meter breaststroke in Paris, a noteworthy time, but was disqualified for a false start.

== Early life ==
Luning was born January 24, 1905 in greater Honolulu, Hawaii, to Fred August Luning and Minnie Kauhaua. He and was of native Hawaiian descent on his mother's side, and of German descent on his father's. He swam for the strong Hui Makami Swim Club primarily under the coaching of Harvey Chilton who founded and began coaching the team in 1918. Among the Hui Makami stars coached by Chilton were Luning's backstroke rival Warren Kealoha, and swimmers Bill Kirschbaum, Johnny Wood, Charles Pung, and the Kalili brothers. Luning was also an outstanding swimmer for the St. Louis School in greater Honolulu.

Luning placed second at the 1924 Olympic trials in Indianapolis, Indiana in the 100-meter backstroke behind fellow Hawaiian and Hui Makami star Warren Kealoha.

== 1924 Paris Olympics ==
Luning competed in the preliminary heats of the men's 100-meter backstroke in 1924 Paris Olympics, under Head U.S. Men's Olympic Coach Bill Bachrach. In his 100-meter backstroke, Luning swam a 1:16.4 in his preliminary heat. He failed to advance to the event final as he was disqualified for a false start. His preliminary round time of 1:16.4 would have put him in very close contention for the bronze medal. Luning's teammate Warren Kealoha took the gold medal with a time of 1:13.2, American Paul Wyatt took the silver with a time of 1:15.4, and Hungarian Karoly Bartha took the bronze with a time of 1:17.8.

In 1925, around June, Luning graduated the St. Louis School, where he had competed on the swim team, though it is not known if he continued and took collegiate level courses there.

=== Marriage ===
After graduating St. Louis School, Luning married Daisey Helenihi on August 21, 1926 in Honolulu. The couple were married by the Reverend Akaiko Akana at Honolulu's Kawaiahao Church.

In later pursuits, Luning served as a Honolulu-based police officer in the 1930's.

Luning died September 13, 1965 at the age of 60 at Kaiser Hospital in greater Honolulu, Hawaii. Services were held on September 18, at Williams Mortuary, and he was buried at Diamond Head Memorial Park. He had been a member of the St. Louis School Alumni Association, the Elks Club, the Kamehameha Lounge, and the Eagles. He was survived by his wife Daisy H. Luning, two sons, a daughter, and numerous grandchildren.

=== Honors ===
Luning was made a member of the Hawai’i Swimming Hall of Fame.
