= Charles Werner Kopp =

Swiss swimmer and water polo player

Personal information
- Nationality: Swiss
- Born: 25 August 1902

Sport
- Sport: Swimming and Water polo

Charles Werner Kopp (born 25 August 1902, date of death unknown) was a Swiss swimmer and water polo player. At the 1924 Summer Olympics he competed at the men's 100 metre freestyle event and the water polo tournament. At the 1936 Summer Olympics he competed only at the water polo tournament.
