= Gé Dekker =

Dutch swimmer

Personal information
- Nationality: Dutch
- Born: 10 December 1904 Zaandam, Netherlands
- Died: 18 March 1995 (aged 90) Zaandam, Netherlands

Sport
- Sport: Swimming

Gé Dekker (10 December 1904 – 18 March 1995) was a Dutch swimmer. He competed in two events at the 1924 Summer Olympics, the 100 metre freestyle and the 4 × 200 metre freestyle relay.
