= Dan Zehr =

American swimmer (1916–2001)

- Zehr in swimsuit at age 16, in his Olympic year

Personal information
- Full name: Robert Daniel Zehr, Sr.
- Nickname: "Dan"
- National team: United States
- Born: April 18, 1916 Fort Wayne, Indiana, U.S.
- Died: August 4, 2001 (aged 85) Raleigh, North Carolina, U.S.
- Occupations: Swim Coach; Steel industry executive
- Height: 6 ft 00 in (1.83 m)

Sport
- Sport: Swimming
- Strokes: backstroke
- Club: Fort Wayne YMCA; Illinois Athletic Club (IAC)
- College team: Northwestern University
- Coach: Tom Robinson (Northwestern)

Robert Daniel Zehr Sr. (April 18, 1916 – August 4, 2001) was an American competition swimmer who represented the United States at the 1932 Summer Olympics in Los Angeles, California.

Zehr was born on April 18, 1916, to Dr. Noah and Rhea Jones Barnhill Zehr and grew up in Fort Wayne, Indiana where he was born. He was a 1934 graduate of Fort Wayne's Southside High School, and did much of his early swimming and training with the Fort Wayne YMCA.

== 1932 Los Angeles Olympics ==
Zehr qualified for the 1932 Olympics at the 1932 trials in Providence, Rhode Island. The Head Coach for the men's Olympic team that year was Yale's Hall of Fame Coach Robert Kiphuth.

At the age of 16, as the youngest member of the 1932 U.S. Olympic team competing August 10–12, Zehr placed fourth in the men's 100-meter backstroke at the 1932 Los Angeles Olympics, finishing with a time of 1:10.9. For the first time in any Olympic event, the Japanese Olympic team made a clean sweep of the 100 meter event, with Masaji Kiyokawa taking the gold. Zehr finished only .9 seconds after the bronze medal winner Kentaro Kawatsu. Japan dominated the swimming competition that year, taking the great majority of gold medals.

Zehr was the 1933 AAU Champion in the 220-yard backstroke for both indoor and outdoor competition. At the 1933 National AAU Swimming Championship, while swimming for the Fort Wayne, Indiana YMCA Swim Club, he won the 150-yard backstroke championship in 1:39.5, making him a national AAU champion, though his time was not a world record.

In 1935, he was part of the United States Olympic exhibition team that competed in Japan. During his career, he would swim for the Illinois Athletic Club in the Chicago area, coached by Hall of Fame Coach Bill Bachrach. He attended the 1936 Olympic trials in Warwick, Rhode Island, swimming the 100-meter backstroke, but came in fourth, requiring a third-place finish or better to qualify for the 1936 U.S. Olympic team.

== Northwestern University ==
He attended Northwestern University under Hall of Fame Coach Tom Robinson, beginning in the Fall of 1934, and graduating in 1938. He served as swim team Captain during his 1937-38 Junior year with Northwestern. On May 23, 1935, in his Freshman year, at an exhibition at the Northwestern Big 10 championship meet, he broke the standing world record, and the National Intercollegiate record for the 150-yard backstroke with a 1:35.2, though the world record was unofficial. At the meet, Northwestern won the 1935 Big Ten Championship in Evanston at their home pool in the Patton Gymnasium. In 1936, he broke the Northwestern record for the Big 10 150-yard backstroke record with a time of 1:39. While swimming for Northwestern, he received All-American honors after winning the 1936 NCAA title in the 150 yard backstroke. Zehr was one of thirteen All-American swim team members coached by Robinson, who was also inducted into the Northwestern Hall of Fame in 1984.

He retired from competitive swimming around 1938. In the 1940s he served as a lieutenant in the U.S. Army.

== Honors ==
He was inducted into the Northwestern University Athletic Hall of Fame in 1984 as a Charter member. Though he did not attend the university, he is also a member of the Indiana University Wall of Fame, for Indiana-based swimming Olympians.

Zehr died on August 4, 2001, in Raleigh, North Carolina. A memorial service was held on August 11, at Independence Village in Raleigh. He was survived by two sons, including Robert Daniel Zehr Jr., a daughter, and grandchildren.

== See also ==
- List of Northwestern University alumni
