= Charles Baillie (swimmer) =

British swimmer

Personal information
- Born: Charles William Kennett Baillie; 4 September 1902 Edinburgh, Scotland
- Died: 5 October 1987 (aged 85) Edinburgh, Scotland

Sport
- Sport: Swimming

Charles William Kennett Baillie (4 September 1902 – 5 October 1987) was a British swimmer. He competed in the men's 100 metre freestyle event at the 1924 Summer Olympics.

Baillie was the son of an Edinburgh baths attendant and was also a club water polo player. He was a police officer, working for the police forces in Edinburgh and Oldham.
