= Johann Schulz (swimmer) =

German swimmer

Personal information
- Died: 1942

Sport
- Sport: Swimming

Johann Schulz (birth date unknown, died 1942) was a German swimmer. He competed in the men's 100-metre backstroke event at the 1928 Summer Olympics. He is believed to have gone missing in action in 1942 during World War II.
