= Shourai Kimura =

Japanese swimmer and journalist

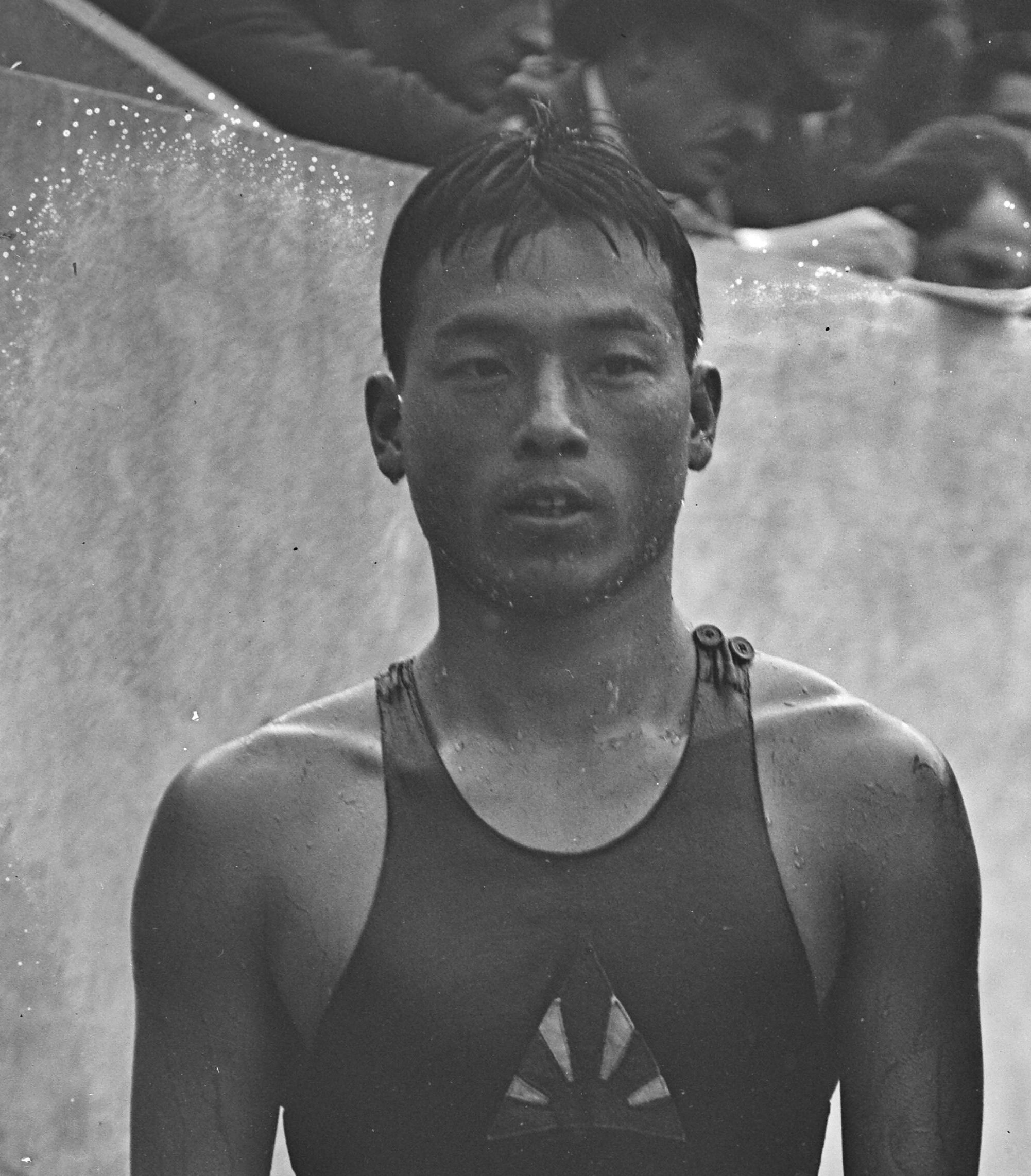

Personal information
- Born: 9 February 1908
- Died: 1986 (aged 77–78)

Sport
- Sport: Swimming

Shourai Kimura (木村 象雷, Kimura Shōrai; 9 February 1908 – 1986) was a Japanese swimmer and journalist. He competed in the men's 100 metre backstroke event at the 1928 Summer Olympics. He later became a sports journalist.
