= Dennis Walker (swimmer) =

Canadian swimmer

Personal information
- Nationality: Canadian
- Born: 10 November 1913 Victoria, British Columbia, Canada
- Died: 30 August 1984 (aged 70) Victoria, British Columbia, Canada

Sport
- Sport: Swimming

Achievements and titles
- Olympic finals: 1932 Summer Olympics

Dennis Walker (10 November 1913 – 30 August 1984) was a Canadian swimmer. He competed in the men's 100 metre backstroke at the 1932 Summer Olympics.
