= Július Balász =

Czechoslovak swimmer (1901–1970)

Personal information
- Born: 5 October 1901 Budapest, Austria-Hungary
- Died: 29 October 1970 (aged 69) Prague, Czechoslovakia

Sport
- Sport: Swimming
Medal record
Men's diving
Representing Czechoslovakia
European Championships
Bronze medal – third place	1926 Budapest	3 m springboard

Július Balász, also Baláž (5 October 1901 – 29 October 1970) was a Czechoslovak swimmer. He competed in the men's 100 metre freestyle event and the diving at the 1924 Summer Olympics and the diving at the 1928 Summer Olympics.

Balász was Jewish. His family was originally from Rajec, a small town in Upper Hungary. At the end of the 19th century they moved to Budapest for work, where Július was later born. He started to train swimming under Béla Komjádi, founder of modern water polo. After World War I his family moved back to Slovakia. Balász moved in 1920 to Brno to study at a local trade academy. There, he joined Jewish sport clubs Makabi Brno and Bar Kochba Brno. He focused on swimming, water polo and diving. In 1935 he competed at the Maccabiah Games in Tel Aviv, where he won a gold medal in 3-meter springboard diving, and helped his Czechoslovak Jewish teammates win a gold medal in water polo.

During World War II, Balász was incarcerated in Theresienstadt and Auschwitz concentration camps. After the war, he changed his surname to Baláž.
