= Marcel Noual =

French swimmer

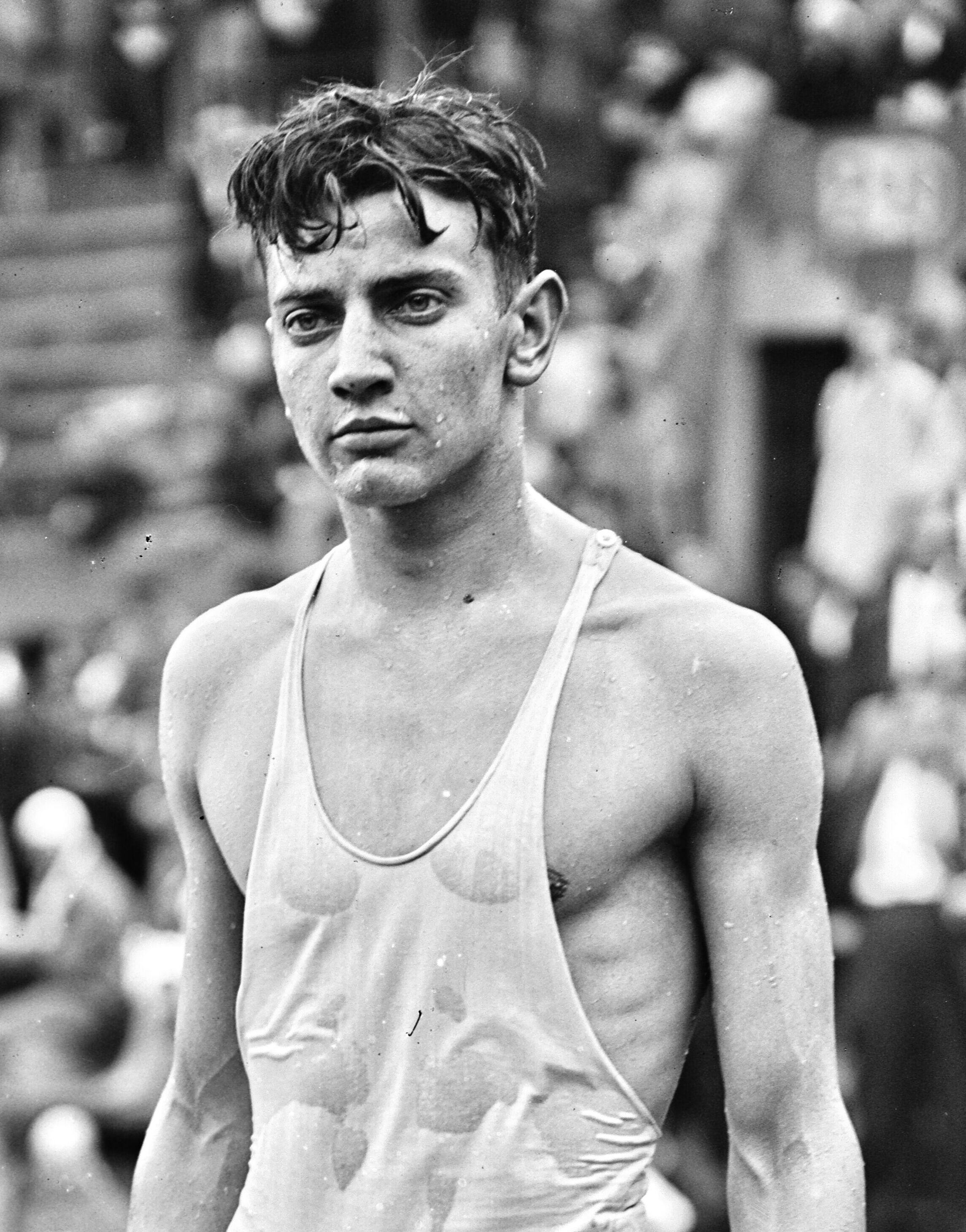
- Marcel Noual in 1931

Personal information
- Nationality: French
- Born: 3 July 1912 Paris, France
- Died: 1 October 1995 (aged 83)

Sport
- Sport: Swimming
- Strokes: backstroke

Marcel Noual (3 July 1912 – 1 October 1995) was a French swimmer. He competed in the men's 100 metre backstroke at the 1932 Summer Olympics.
