= Robert Kerber =

American swimmer (1913–1991)

Robert W. Kerber
- Kerber circa 1930s

Personal information
- Full name: Robert William Kerber Sr.
- National team: United States
- Born: June 11, 1913 Park Ridge, Illinois, U.S.
- Died: December 1, 1991 (aged 78) Gainesville, Florida, U.S.
- Education: Northwestern University (1934)
- Occupations: Business Management, Manufacturing; Realtor, Robert Kerber Realty
- Spouse: Ruth Sethness Kerber
- Children: 1 son

Sport
- Sport: Swimming
- Event: 100-meter backstroke (Olympics)
- Strokes: Freestyle; Backstroke
- College team: Northwestern University
- Coach: Tom Robinson (Northwestern U.); Robert J. H. Kiphuth ('32 Olympics)

Robert William Kerber (June 11, 1913 – December 1, 1991) was an American competition swimmer who swam for Northwestern University, and represented the United States in the men's 100-meter backstroke at the 1932 Summer Olympics in Los Angeles, California where he placed sixth overall with a time of 1:12.8. In March 1930, while a Senior at Maine Township High School in Des Plaines, Illinois, Kerber was credited with setting an interscholastic National record in the 220-yard freestyle with a time of 2:19.2. After a move to Pompano Beach, Florida from Illinois in 1949 where he had managed a metal fabrication company, Kerber worked as a Realtor, and founded Robert Kerber Realty which he operated through 1985. He was the manager and developer of the Coral Tides Apartments in Pompano Beach and developed several other properties in the city. He moved with his family to Boca Raton, Florida in 1970, then retired to Gainesville, Florida in 1988 where his son was living.

Robert Kerber was born June 11, 1913, in Park Ridge, Illinois, a suburb Northwest of greater Chicago. In March 1930, Kerber swam for Maine Township High School, in Des Plaines, Iowa, four miles Northwest of Park Ridge. At a meet at Northwestern University in March, 1930, in his most widely publicized High School swimming achievement, Kerber set an interscholastic High School record representing Main Township High in the 220-yard freestyle with a time of 2:19.2 breaking the prior national record of 2:21. Maine Township High School, which included a Maine Township North, South, West, and East, after several closings, now exists only as Maine Township High School East.

== 1932 Los Angeles Olympics ==
He qualified for the 1932 Olympics at the mid-July Olympic trials at the Coney Island Pool in Cincinnati, Ohio with a time of 1:11.2 in the 100-meter backstroke, finishing a close second behind Dan Zehr of Fort Wayne, Indiana who completed the event final with a time of 1:10.4. Several trial swimmers complained that the water temperature at the Coney Pool was too warm. Kerber's second-place finish in the finals qualified him for the U.S. 1932 Los Angeles Olympic men's swimming team.

At the August, 1932 Olympics, at the age of 19, Kerber finished sixth in the men's 100-meter backstroke, recording a time of 1:12.8 in the final. At the 1932 Olympics, Kerber was managed and trained by Robert J. H. Kiphuth, an International Swimming Hall of Fame Inductee, who coached the Yale swim team for three decades. Kerber was clocked with a time of 1:13.0 in the event semi-final which qualified him to compete in the finals. In the final round, he was just under three seconds from contending for a metal, with Masaji Kiyokawa of Japan taking the gold with a time of 1:08.6, Toshio Irie of Japan taking the silver with a time of 1:09.8, and Kentaro Kawatsu of Japan taking the bronze with a time of 1:10.0.

== Northwestern University ==
Kerber became a graduate of Northwestern University in 1934, and according to several sources, including the Morning Call of Patterson, New Jersey, and Olympedia, he swam for the team if briefly, as it is listed as his team during the 1932 Olympic trials. At Northwestern, Kerber would have competed and trained for Northwestern Head Coach Thomas H. Robinson who coached Northwestern from 1909 to 1944, though details of Kerber's swimming achievements with Northwestern are difficult to locate in newspapers of the era.

== Later careers and avocations ==
In Illinois, likely in the greater Chicago area, Kerber was the owner of a business that did metal fabrication. He moved with his family to Pampano Beach, Florida from Illinois in 1949, later relocating to Gainesville, Florida in 1988. Kerber was employed as a realtor in Pampano Beach, and was responsible for the construction of the apartment building Coral Tides on Pampano Beach's Briny Avenue. Through 1956, he and his family helped operate the Coral Tides Apartments. He organized Pompano Beach's Kiwanis Club in the early 1950s and helped start the city's first troop of Boy Scouts. In the Pampano Beach area, Kerber founded Robert Kerber Realty, which he operated through 1985, continuing to manage several properties in the Industrial Park area of Pompano and in other locations in the city.

In 1970, the family relocated to Boca Raton, Florida where Kerber belonged to the Royal Palm Country Club. After a 1988 move to the area, Kerber died on December 1, 1991, in Gainesville, Florida at the age of 78, after suffering from cancer for three months. Kerber's son Robert Kerber Junior was a resident of Gainesville. Robert W. Kerber, Senior was survived by Ruth Sethness Kerber, his wife, his son Robert W. Kerber Junior, and four grandchildren.

== See also ==
- List of Northwestern University alumni
