= Pieter Jacobszoon =

Dutch swimmer

Personal information
- Nationality: Dutch
- Born: 23 August 1903 Amsterdam, Netherlands
- Died: 14 February 1972 (aged 68) Wieringermeer, Netherlands

Sport
- Sport: Swimming

Pieter Jacobszoon (23 August 1903 – 14 February 1972) was a Dutch swimmer. He competed in the men's 100 metre freestyle event at the 1924 Summer Olympics.
