= John McDowall (swimmer) =

British swimmer

Personal information
- Born: 25 February 1902
- Died: 4 July 1936 (aged 34)

Sport
- Sport: Swimming

John McDowall (25 February 1902 – 4 July 1936) was a British swimmer. He competed in the men's 100 metre backstroke event at the 1924 Summer Olympics.

== Competitions ==
- 9 May 1923, Paisley corporation baths, Paisley, Scotland - 100 yards Backstroke setting new record of 1min 57sec.
- 1923 Blackpool, England - Beat the reigning Amateur Swimming Association 150 yards backstroke champion Austin Rawlinson during the national 220 yards championship meeting.
- 1924 Olympics, Paris - Competed for UK in Men's 100m Backstroke. Came 5th in Semi-Finals.

== Suspension ==
2 Feb 1929 Suspended for Life from ASA (Scotland) for participating in an unsanctioned gala at Stranraer.
