= Maurice Ducos =

French swimmer

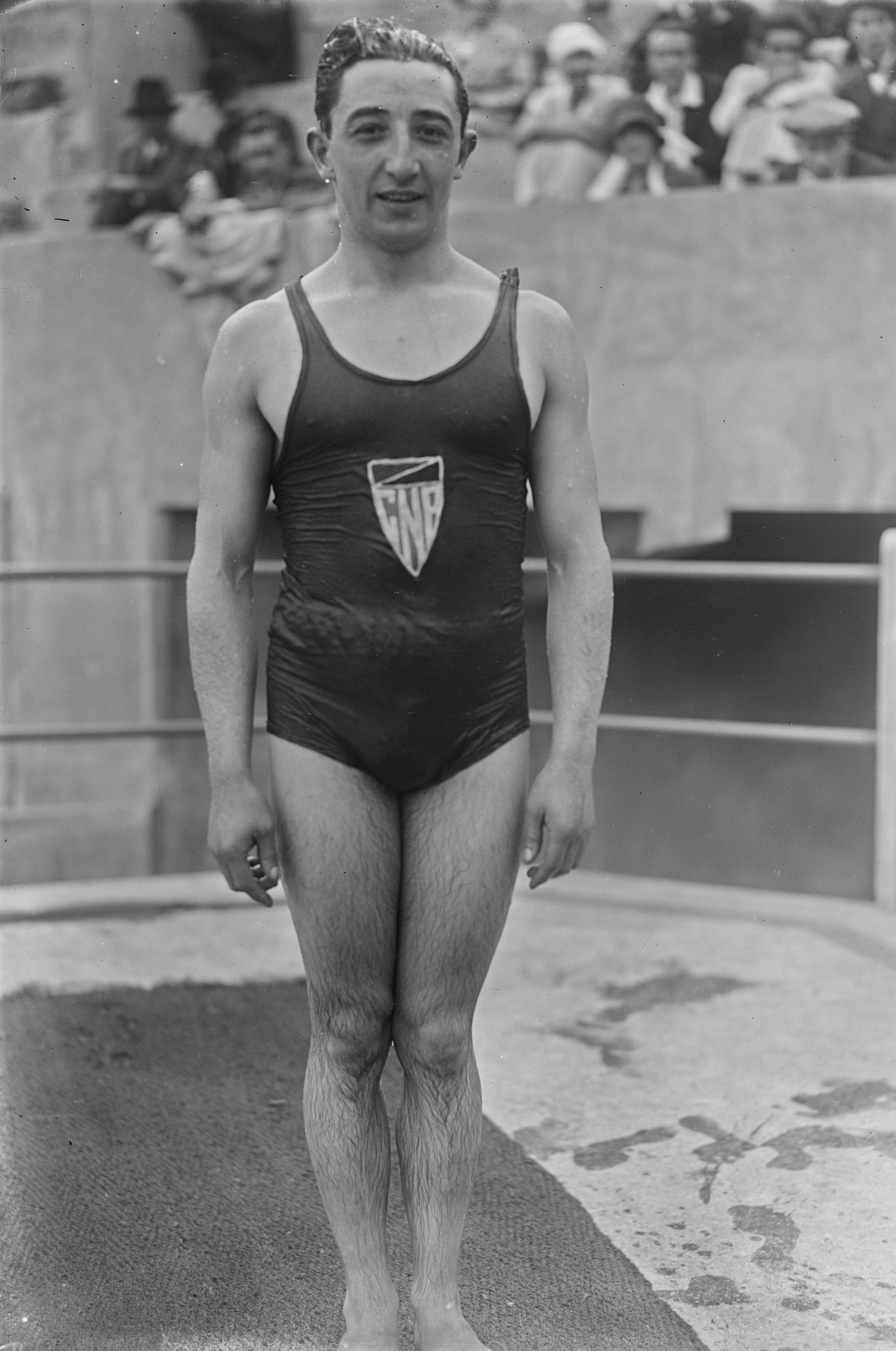

Personal information
- Born: 15 October 1904 15th arrondissement, Paris, France
- Died: 30 June 1983 (aged 78) Sablé-sur-Sarthe, France

Sport
- Sport: Swimming
- Strokes: Backstroke
- Club: Club des Nageurs de Paris

Maurice Ducos (15 October 1904 – 30 June 1983) was a French swimmer. He competed in the men's 100 metre backstroke event at the 1924 Summer Olympics, placing fourth with a time of 1:25.0.
