= Ernst Küppers =

German swimmer (1904–1976)

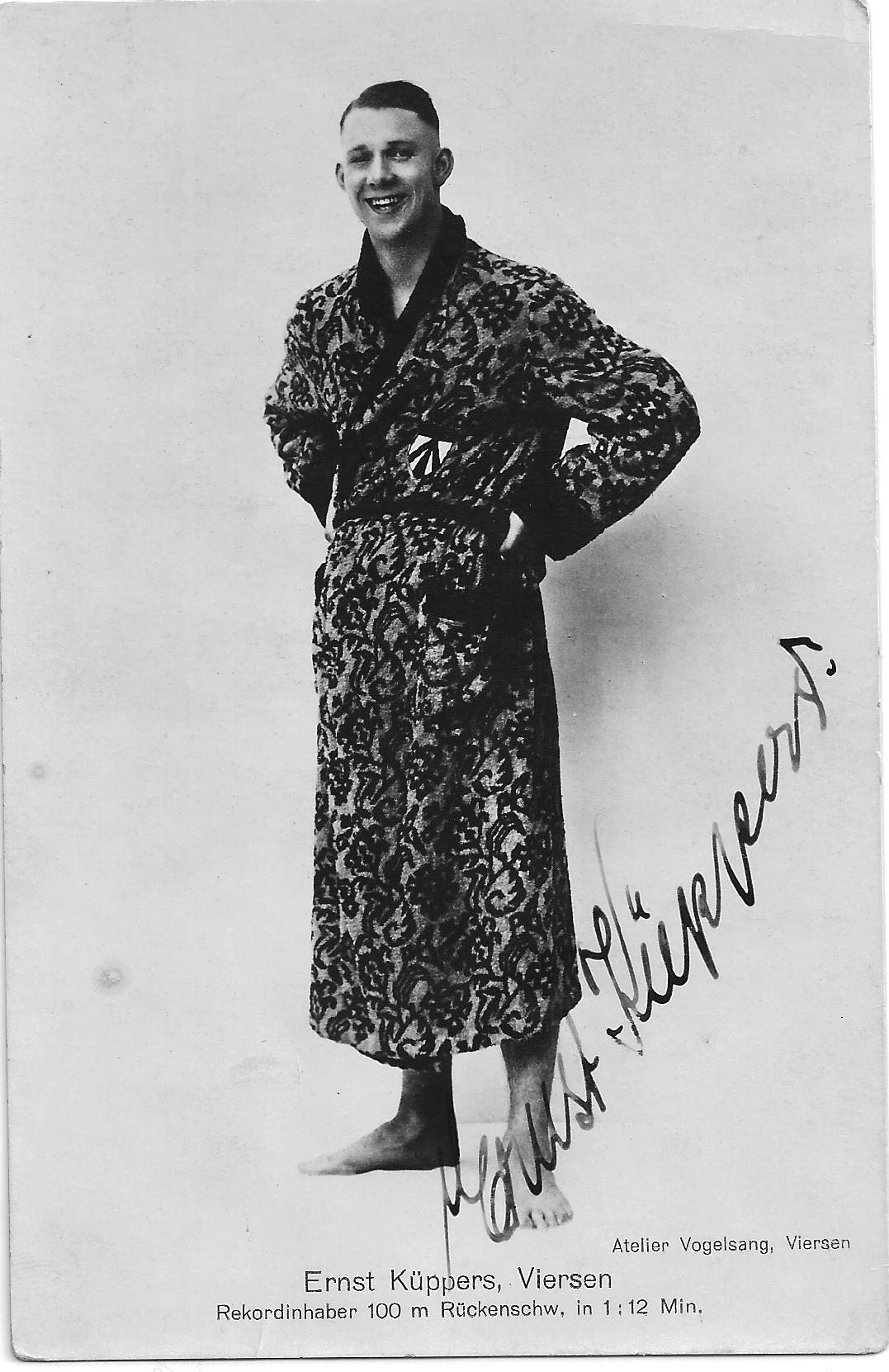

Personal information
- Born: July 9, 1904 Viersen, German Empire
- Died: July 23, 1976 (aged 72) Nordhorn, West Germany

Sport
- Sport: Swimming
- Strokes: Backstroke
Medal record
Representing Germany
European Championships
Silver medal – second place	1934 Magdeburg	100 m backstroke

Ernst Küppers (July 9, 1904 – July 23, 1976) was a German backstroke swimmer who competed in the 1928 Summer Olympics and in the 1932 Summer Olympics. He was born in Viersen and died in Nordhorn. He was the husband of Reni Erkens and the father of Ernst-Joachim Küppers.

In 1928, he finished fifth in the 100 metre backstroke competition. Four years later he again finished fifth in the 100 metre backstroke event at the 1932 Games.

Thinking Kuppers was likely to win the 100 metre backstroke at the 1934 European Championships in Magdeburg, Hitler commissioned a large bronze eagle trophy for the race. This weighed over 50 kilograms (110 lb) and stood nearly 1 metre (3 ft 3 in) high. When John Besford of England won the race, Hitler refused to present the trophy as intended and left the stadium, leaving one of his officials to present it instead to Küppers’ rival.
