= Albert Schumberg =

German swimmer

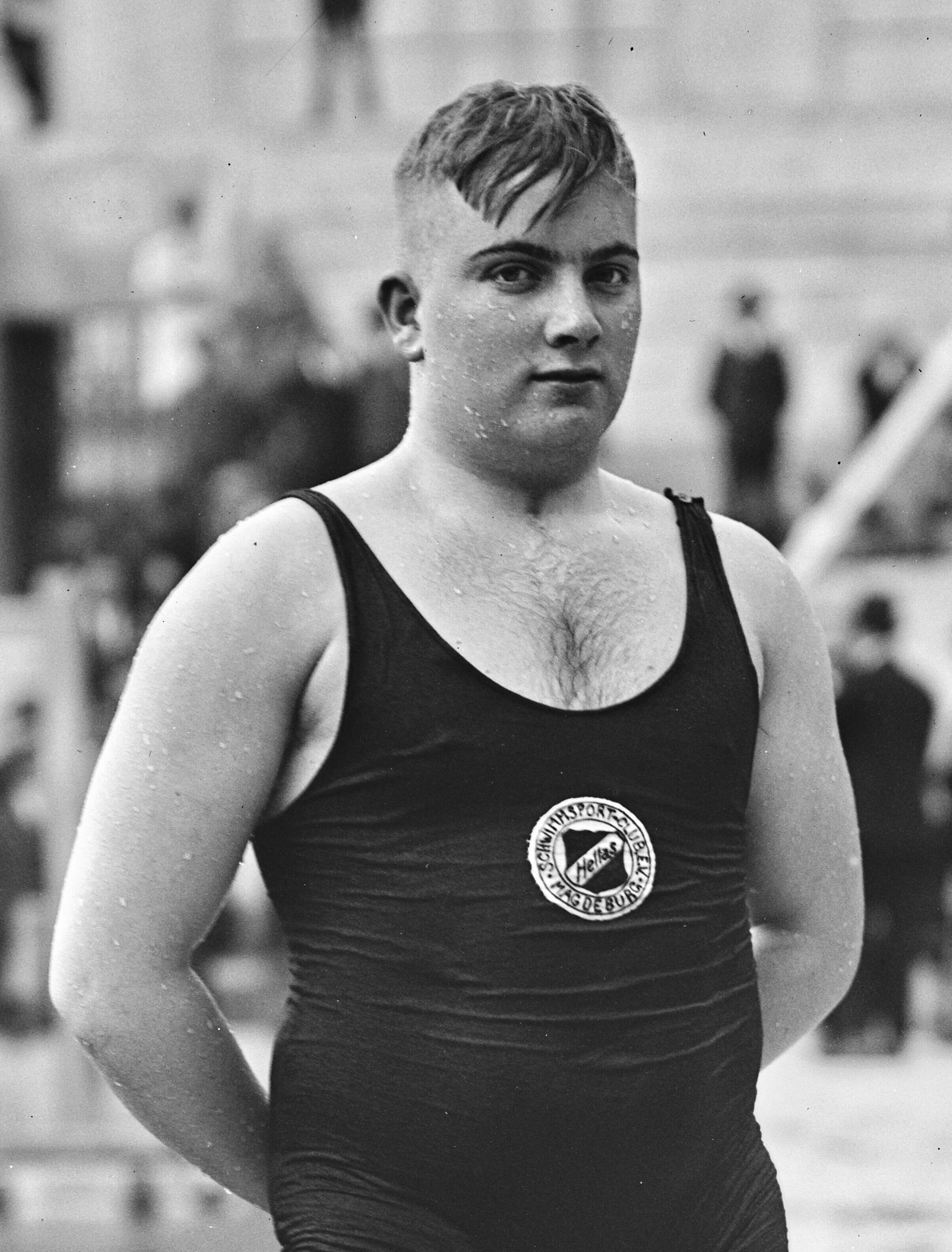
- Albert Schumburg in 1927

Personal information
- Born: 19 April 1909 Kiel, Germany
- Died: 16 January 1967 (aged 57) Magdeburg, Germany

Sport
- Sport: Swimming

Albert Schumberg (19 April 1909 – 16 January 1967) was a German swimmer. He competed in the men's 100 metre backstroke event at the 1928 Summer Olympics.
