= Gordon Chalmers (swimmer) =

American swimmer

Biographical details
- Born: February 24, 1911; Cranford, New Jersey, U.S.
- Died: January 18, 2000 (aged 88); Hendersonville, North Carolina, U.S.

Playing career

Swimming
- c. 1931–1934: Franklin & Marshall

Soccer
- c. 1931–1935: Franklin & Marshall
- Position: Quarterback

Coaching career (HC unless noted)

Swimming
- 1940–1941: Lafayette
- 1941–1942: Lehigh
- 1944–1946: Lehigh
- 1947–1959: Army

Administrative career (AD unless noted)
- 1959–1966: Iowa State
- 1967–1973: Indiana State

Gordon H. "Slim" Chalmers (February 24, 1911 – January 18, 2000) was an American swimmer, swimming coach, and college athletics administrator. He competed in the men's 100 metre backstroke at the 1932 Summer Olympics. He served as the athletic director at Iowa State University from 1959 to 1966 and at Indiana State University from 1967 to 1973

A resident of East Orange, New Jersey, Chalmers won the title in the 100-yard backstroke at the national interscholastic aquatic champions at Columbia University in March 1930, leading East Orange High School to a second-place team finish.
