= Kentaro Kawatsu =

Japanese swimmer (1914–1970)

Kentarō Kawatsu
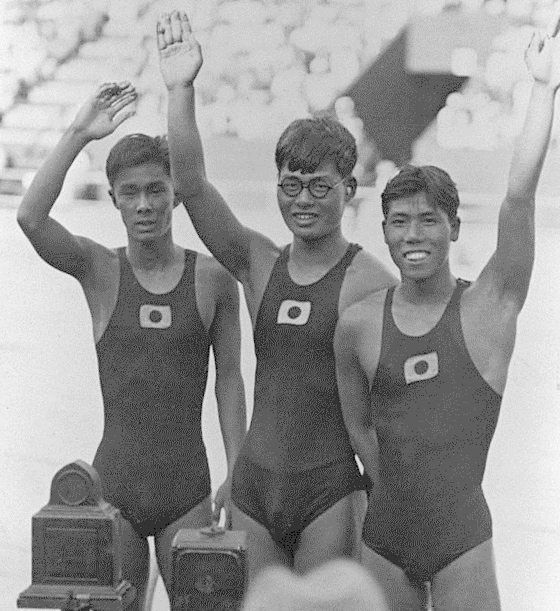
- Kentaro Kawatsu (left), Toshio Irie and Masaji Kiyokawa at the 1932 Olympics

Personal information
- Native name: 河津憲太郎
- Nationality: Japanese
- Born: September 26, 1915 Hiroshima, Japan
- Died: March 23, 1970 (aged 54)

Sport
- Sport: Swimming
- Strokes: backstroke
Medal record
Representing Japan
Olympic Games
Bronze medal – third place	1932 Los Angeles	100 m backstroke

Kentaro Kawatsu (河津憲太郎, Kawatsu Kentarō; September 26, 1914 – March 23, 1970) was a Japanese swimmer who competed at the 1932 Summer Olympics.

Kawatsu was a native of Hiroshima City, where his father, a physical education instructor at the predecessor of Hiroshima University, became known as the "Father of Hiroshima Sports".

In 1930, while still in middle school, Kawatsu set a new Japan record of 33.2 seconds for the 50-meter backstroke. In 1932, while a student at Meiji University, he was selected for the Japanese Olympic team to the Los Angeles Olympics. The Japanese swimming team had significant success that year. The team took the gold, silver and bronze medals in the 100 meter backstroke event, with Kawatsu winning the bronze medal.

He subsequently participated in the 1934 Far Eastern Games held in Manila.

Kawatsu killed himself on March 23, 1970.
