= Károly Bartha (swimmer) =

Hungarian swimmer (1907–1991)

Personal information
- Full name: Bartha Károly
- Nationality: Hungarian
- Born: 4 November 1907 Budapest
- Died: 4 February 1991 (aged 83) Boston, Massachusetts

Sport
- Sport: Swimming
- Strokes: Backstroke
- Club: Nemzeti Torna Egylet
Medal record
Men's swimming
Representing Hungary
Olympic Games
Bronze medal – third place	1924 Paris	100 m backstroke
European Championships
Silver medal – second place	1926 Budapest	100 m backstroke

Károly Bartha (4 November 1907 – 4 February 1991) was a Hungarian swimmer who competed in the 1924 Summer Olympics. He won a bronze medal in the 100 m backstroke event.
