= Virtual Teaching Collection =

Image of Cabinet Interface (1995)

The Virtual Teaching Collection (VTC) project at the Museum of Archaeology and Anthropology, University of Cambridge within the University of Cambridge, led by Dr Robin Boast, ran from 1994 to 1997 and was part of the Teaching and Learning Technology Project funded by the Higher Education Funding Council for England.

The VTC was an early innovative social computing project that developed a software program, Cabinet, which ran on Apple Macs and allowed users to create, develop, manage and comment on virtual museum collections. The project anticipated many of the current features of the social web and social computing.

The VTC was concerned with virtual objects. It was a collection of digital representations that may be used as a collection. The images did not pretend to be the objects, but were objects in their own right and, therefore, able to constitute a collection in their own right.

The goals of the VTC were twofold. First, to explore the range and potential of producing and using digital representations in their various forms; images, texts, hypertexts, video, sound, 3D images, and illustrations. Second, to construct a working digital museum that was meaningful to the way we work with collections.

The collections that were developed included about 4,000 images and other representations of objects, along with the related catalogue information. Within the Archaeology Collection, these objects span the Neolithic to the Medieval period in Britain. The History of Science Collection drew on the collections of the Whipple Museum at the University of Cambridge and the History of Science Collection at the University of Oxford. As well as directly related information, these Collections also included text, video, and display resources, as well as bibliographies and glossaries.

Included in the collections were a variety of what were called "narratives". These were works using the collections in a variety of forms from traditional documents to hyper-documents to display spaces, but these are seen, much as any work, as the view of an author. This was central to the way that Cabinet collections work. They are not fixed ‘textbooks’ but flexible resources that teachers and students may work with to create meaningful works. It was in this way that the collections do not form an end in themselves, but a means of working. They are the very flexible resource that students and researchers use to think with.

== Cabinet ==
Cabinet was a software application developed as part of the VTC and was designed to be an easy-to-use and well-presented suite of software tools that were intuitive. Using these tools, the user could create their own collection, and could search, retrieve, display and browse the existing collections. The presentation tools allowed the user to compare different objects, to identify and display significant details, to create links to related images, video and text, and to embed representations in their own authored texts or other presentations, whether these be straightforward documents or more complex hyper-documents.

Cabinet was not simply a multimedia authoring tool. It was designed to be under the control not only of the author, but also of the reader. The collections were not interactive in the conventional sense, but were interactive in the sense that the reader could also modify or even re-author what had been produced. This kind of flexibility of presentation tools freed the user from the rigidity of traditional presentations and gave access to the full potential of contextualising information. There was an increased variety of narrative forms, but, primarily, it was an environment within which students and researchers could construct and explore new ways of thinking about material objects and their history.

== Project participants ==
Lead institution

- Museum of Archaeology and Anthropology, Cambridge University

Consortium members

- The Whipple Museum, Cambridge University
- The Museum of the History of Science, Oxford University
- The Department of Archaeology, Glasgow University
- The Lansdown Centre for Electronic Arts, Middlesex University
- The Centre for Metropolitan History, University College London
