= Aart van Wilgenburg =

Dutch swimmer

Personal information
- Born: 16 September 1902 Amsterdam, Netherlands
- Died: 22 December 1955 (aged 53) Alkmaar, Netherlands

Sport
- Sport: Swimming

Aart van Wilgenburg (16 September 1902 – 22 December 1955) was a Dutch swimmer. He competed in the men's 100 metre backstroke event at the 1924 Summer Olympics.
