= Masaji Kiyokawa =

Japanese swimmer (1913–1999)

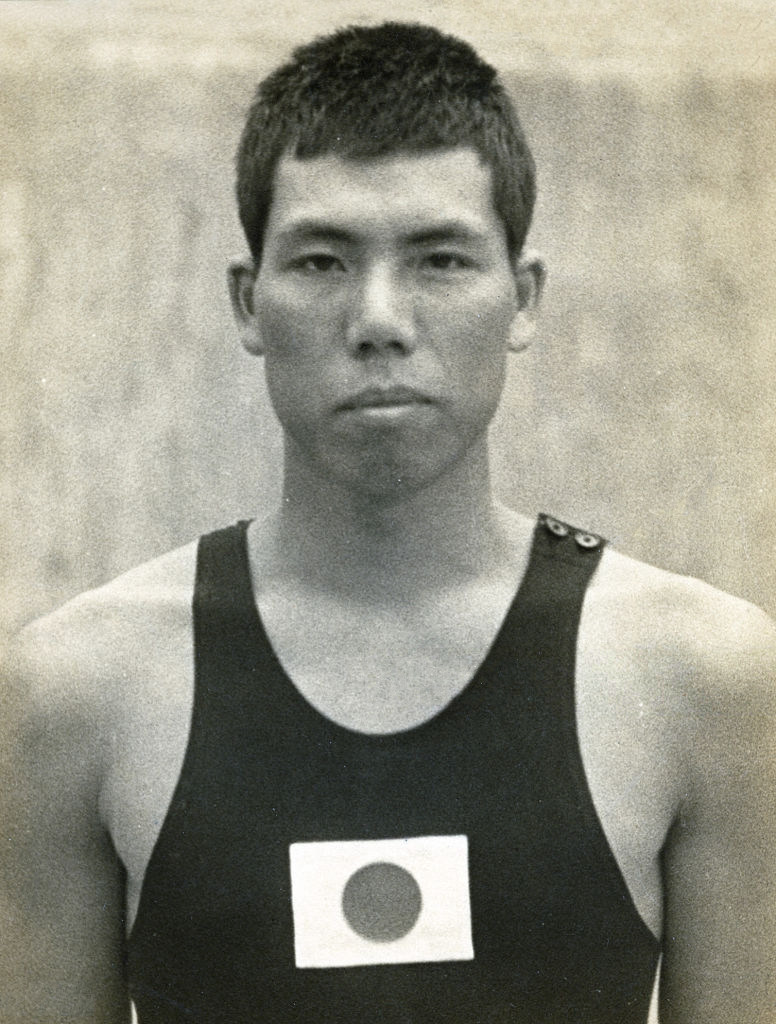
- Kiyokawa in 1936

Personal information
- Native name: 清川 正二
- Nationality: Japanese
- Born: February 11, 1913 Toyohashi, Aichi, Japan
- Died: April 13, 1999 (aged 86) Tokyo, Japan

Sport
- Sport: Swimming
- Strokes: backstroke
Medal record
Men's Swimming
Representing Japan
Olympic Games
| Gold medal – first place | 1932 Los Angeles | 100 m backstroke |
| Bronze medal – third place | 1936 Berlin | 100 m backstroke |

Masaji Kiyokawa (清川 正二, Kiyokawa Masaji; February 11, 1913 – April 13, 1999) was a Japanese businessman, sports administrator and backstroke swimmer who won two medals at the 1932 and 1936 Olympics. During his swimming career Kiyokawa set one world record, in the 400-metre backstroke.

Kiyokawa was born in Toyohashi, Aichi Prefecture, and graduated from the Tokyo College of Commerce (now Hitotsubashi University). Selected as a member of the Japanese swimming team at the 1932 Los Angeles Olympics, he won the gold medal in the 100 m backstroke event, with teammates Toshio Irie and Kentaro Kawatsu taking the silver and bronze. At the 1936 Berlin Olympics, he placed third in the same event.

In 1948, Kiyokawa became a director of the Japan Swimming Federation, and a member of the International Olympic Committee from 1975 to 1989, serving as vice chairman from 1979 to 1983. During his tenure, the city of Nagoya made a bid for the 1988 Summer Olympics, competing against Seoul, South Korea. Kiyokawa was critical of the large amounts of money being spent by both parties to entertain and influence the votes of the IOC members. He was also critical of the decision of the Japanese government to bow to political pressure from the United States to boycott the 1980 Summer Olympics in Moscow.

Kiyokawa was the CEO of the general trading company Kanematsu Corp. from 1976. He died of pancreatic cancer on April 13, 1999.

== See also ==
- List of members of the International Swimming Hall of Fame
