= Clayton Bourne =

Canadian swimmer

Personal information
- Born: 25 April 1904 Atlin, British Columbia, Canada
- Died: 31 December 1986 (aged 82) Montreal, Quebec, Canada

Sport
- Sport: Swimming

Clayton Bourne (25 April 1904 – 31 December 1986) was a Canadian swimmer. He competed in the men's 100 metre freestyle event at the 1924 Summer Olympics.
