= Robin Boast =

British historian of technology and heritage

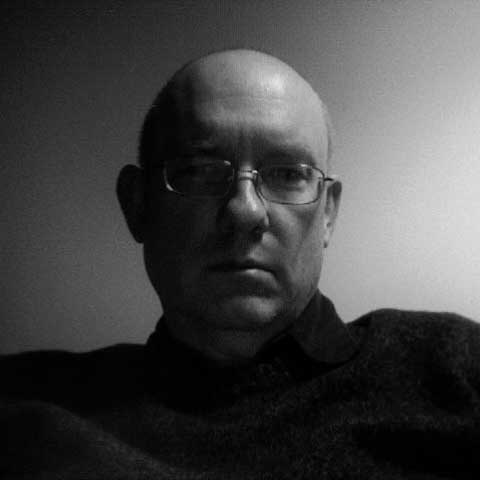
- Born: 2 March 1956 (age 70)

Robin Benville Boast (born 2 March 1956) is the Professor Emeritus at the University of Amsterdam, Department of Media Studies. Until the end of 2012 Boast was an Associate Professor and Curator for World Archaeology at the Museum of Archaeology and Anthropology, University of Cambridge. Until 2010, Prof. Boast was the Graduate Tutor at Hughes Hall College in Cambridge. In December 2021, Boast retired from the University of Amsterdam where he taught for nine years on Cultural Information Science, Neo-colonial information governance, and the history and sociology of digitally and collecting. He remains an Emeritus Professor at the University of Amsterdam and is a Cornwall Associate at the University of Exeter.

He has been a visiting professor at the European University Institute in Florence, a principal investigator/scientific advisor for several EU projects, and was the director of the Virtual Teaching Collection Project. Boast has worked in museums in the US and Britain for over 30 years, specialising in museum access, classification and documentation, especially around diverse knowledge communities. Through a program of historical, theoretical and practical inquiry, his research explores forms of informed, collaborative and critical access to museum spaces and collections. Boast is currently working with many indigenous communities around the world that seek to enable and re-centre the many dimensions of local knowledge expertise within the academy – research informed by the critiques of the Sociology of Scientific Knowledge, Post-colonial studies, Indigenous Studies and collaborative developments in e-Science.

He has worked for several years on an international research project which subjects the museum and the academy to the ethnographic gaze of indigenous partners to de-centre the ownership and control of research of indigenous patrimony. Boast has worked with source community museums and heritage organizations with Ramesh Srinivasan and James Enote, primarily at the A:shiwi A:wan Museum & Heritage Center in Zuni, New Mexico (USA). Most recently, Boast has been involved with repatriation and archiving projects with the Office of Indigenous Strategy and Engagement, Flinders University. His recent book projects include The Machine in the Ghost: Digitality and its Consequences, as well as an ongoing book project on Digital Information.

Prof. Boast was, until 2024, the Chair of the EU's Europeana Research Advisory Board.

== Publications ==
- Boast, Robin (2020) Future, What Future?. In schnittpunkt and Joachim Baur (eds.), Das Museum der Zukunft. 43 neue Beiträge zur Diskussion über die Zukunft des Museums (The Museum of the Future, 43 new Contributions to the Discussion about the Future of the Museum), Edition Museum. 48:79-84.
- Boast, Robin (2017) The Machine in the Ghost: Digitality and its Consequences. London: Reaktion Books.
- Boast, Robin (2011) Neocolonial Collaboration: Museum as Contact Zone Revisited. Museum Anthropology 34(1):56-70.
- Boast, R. (2002) Computing Futures: A Vision of the Past. In B. Cunliffe, W. Davies and C. Renfrew (eds.), Archaeology: the widening debate. London, British Academy, pp. 567–592.
- Boast, R. (2002) Pots as Categories: British Beakers. In A. Woodward and J.D. Hill (eds.) Prehistoric Britain: The Ceramic Basis, Oxbow Books, Oxford, pp. 96–105.
- Boast, R, S. Guha and A. Herle (2001) Collecting Sights: the Photographic Collections of the Museum of Archaeology & Anthropology, 1850-1970. Cambridge: Museum of Archaeology and Anthropology, Cambridge University Press.
- Boast, R. (2000) Speculum, Exemplar, Imago. In A. Lowe & S. Schaffer (eds.), N01SE: Universal Language, Pattern Recognition, Data Synaesthetics. Cambridge, Kettle's Yard.
- Boast, R. (1997) A small company of actors: a critique of style. Journal of Material Culture, 2(2):173-198.
- Boast, R. (1997) Virtual Collections. In G. Denford (ed.), Representing Archaeology in Museums, Museum Archaeologist 22:94-100.
- Boast, R. (1995) The Virtual Teaching Collection: Multimedia access to museum collections. Proceedings of "Information: the Hidden Resource, The Seventh International Conference of the Museum Documentation Association, Edinburgh. Cambridge, Museum Documentation Association, pp. 323–334.
- Boast, R. (1995) Fine Pots, Pure Pots, Beaker Pots. In I. Kinnes and G. Varndell (eds). 'Unbaked Urns of Rudely Shape' Essays on British and Irish Pottery for Ian Longworth, Oxford, Oxbow Monograph 55, pp. 69–80.

== Joint publications ==
- Boast, Robin and Jim Enote (2013) Virtual Repatriation: It's Virtual, but it's not Repatriation. In Peter Biehl and Christopher Prescott (eds.), Heritage in Context of Globalization: Europe and the Americas. New York: SpringerBriefs in Archaeology. 8:103-113.
- Srinivasan, Ramesh, Robin Boast, J. Furner and Katherine Becvar (2009) Digital museums and diverse cultural knowledges: Moving past the traditional catalog. The Information Society. 25(3):.
- Srinivasan, Ramesh, Robin Boast, Katherine Becvar and Jim Enote (2009) Diverse Knowledges and Contact Zones within the Digital Museum. Science, Technology, & Human Values, 34(3): .
- Srinivasan, Ramesh, Jim Enote, Katherine M. Becvar, and Robin Boast (2009) Critical and Reflective Uses of New Media Technologies in Tribal Museums. Museum Management and Curatorship, 24(2): 169-189.
- Srinivasan, R., R. Boast, K. M. Becvar and J. Furner (2009) Blobgects: Digital Museum Catalogs and Diverse User Communities. Journal of the American Society for Information Science and Technology (JASIST), 60(4): 666-678.
