= Torahiko Miyahata =

Japanese swimmer (1903–1988)

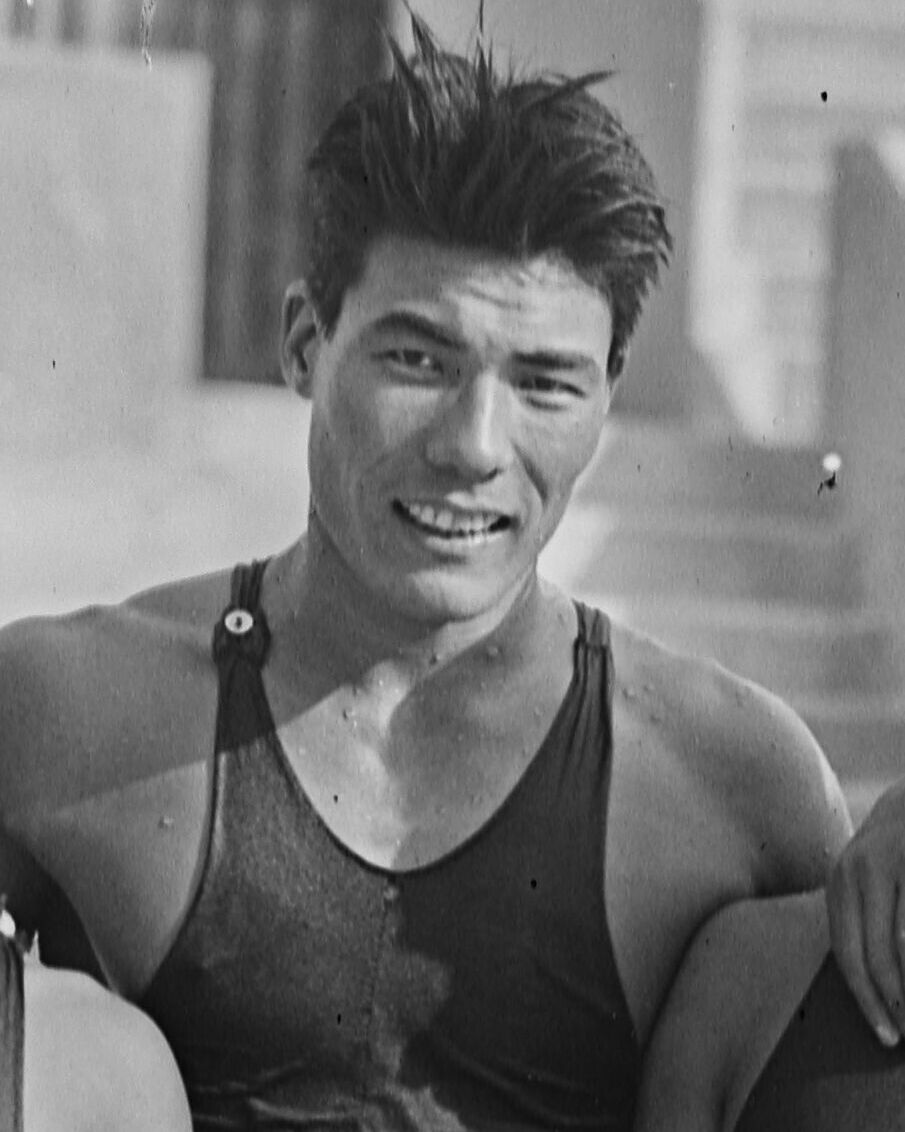
- Torahiko Miyahata in 1924

Personal information
- Born: January 23, 1903 Shimanto, Kochi Prefecture, Japan
- Died: May 16, 1988 (aged 85)

Sport
- Sport: Swimming

Torahiko Miyahata (宮畑 虎彦, Miyahata Torahiko; 23 January 1903 – 16 May 1988 in Shimanto) was a Japanese freestyle swimmer. He competed in the 1924 Summer Olympics. In 1924, he did not show for the semi-finals of the 100 metre freestyle event. He was also a member of the Japanese relay team which finished fourth in the 4 × 200 metre freestyle relay competition.
