= Brier Hill (Brier Hill, Pennsylvania) =

Historic district in Pennsylvania, United States

- U.S. National Register of Historic Places
- U.S. Historic district
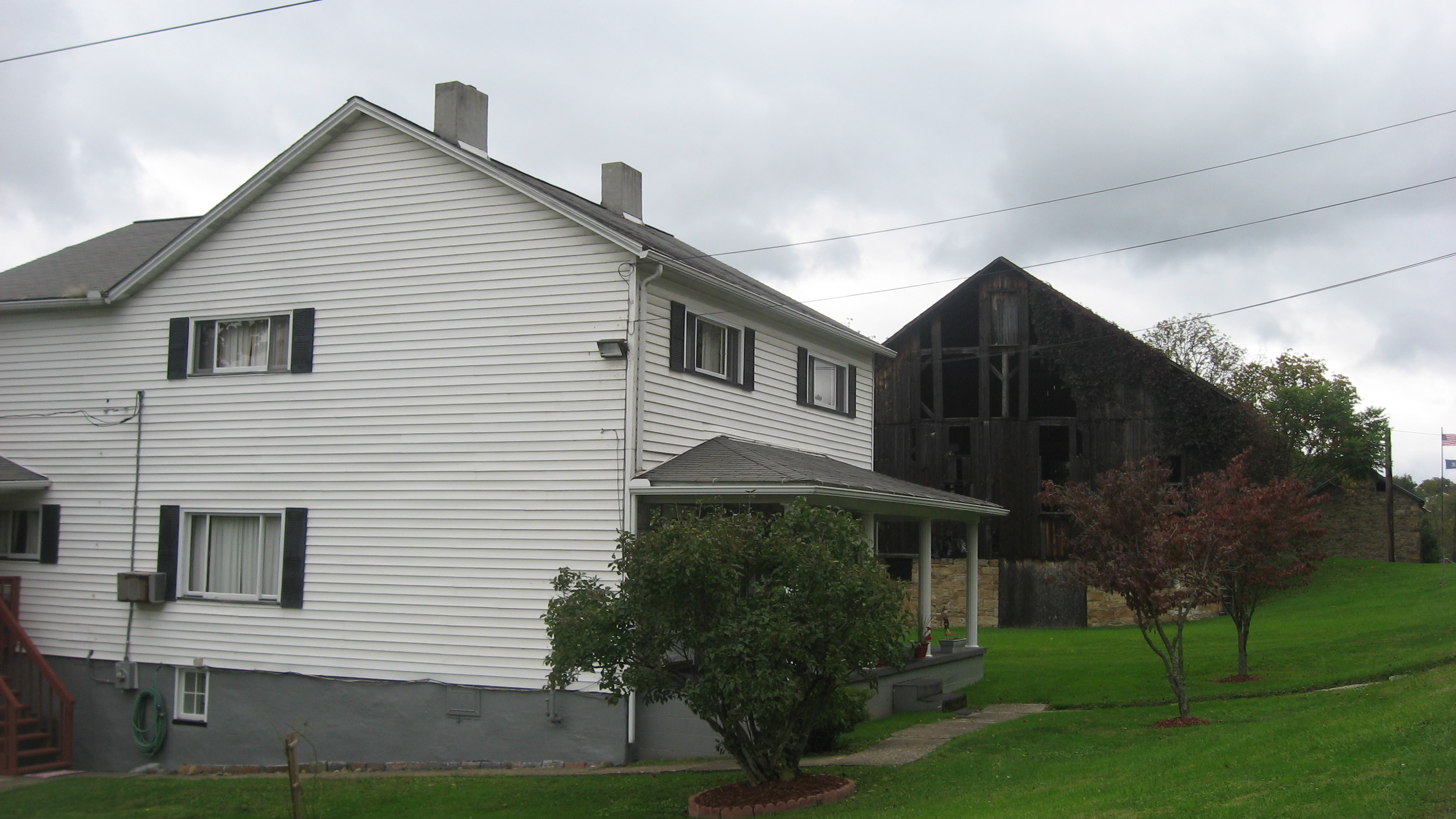
- Buildings at Brier Hill, Buildings at Brier Hill.jpg

- Location within Pennsylvania Location within the United States
- Location: On U.S. 40, Brier Hill, Redstone Township
- Coordinates: 39°58′46″N 79°49′49″W
- Area: 45 acres (18 ha)
- Built: 1902-1904
- NRHP reference No.: 73001629
- Added to NRHP: July 2, 1973

Brier Hill is a national historic district located at Redstone Township, Fayette County, Pennsylvania. The district includes 18 contributing buildings and 75 contributing structures in the coal mining community of Brier Hill. Most of the contributing buildings and structures were built between 1902, when the community was founded, and 1937, when the mine closed. The district includes five frame double houses, the Power House, Hoist House, garage, and a number of unidentified buildings and structures.

It was added to the National Register of Historic Places in 1973.
