= Austin Rawlinson =

British swimmer

Austin Rawlinson MBE
Personal information
- Full name: Austin Rawlinson
- National team: Great Britain
- Born: 7 November 1902 West Derby, England
- Died: 25 November 2000 (aged 98) Liverpool, England

Sport
- Sport: Swimming
- Club: Garston SC

Austin Rawlinson, MBE RM (7 November 1902 – 25 November 2000) was one of the first Englishmen to swim the back crawl in competitions, which he has done in ca. 1915. He won the first British backstroke title (150 yards in 1921), and defended it from 1922 to 1926. Rawlinson finished fifth in the 100-metre backstroke at the 1924 Summer Olympics. He also competitively played water polo.

A police officer by profession, he spent most of his free time as a swimming coach, referee and administrator. He was the head coach of the British swimming team at the 1958 European Championships, and the team manager at the 1960 Summer Olympics. In the 1961 New Year Honours he was made a Member of the Order of the British Empire (MBE) for his services to swimming; in 1968 he was appointed as president of Amateur Swimming Association, and in 1994 he was inducted into the International Swimming Hall of Fame.

== See also ==
- List of members of the International Swimming Hall of Fame
