= Giyo Saito =

Japanese swimmer

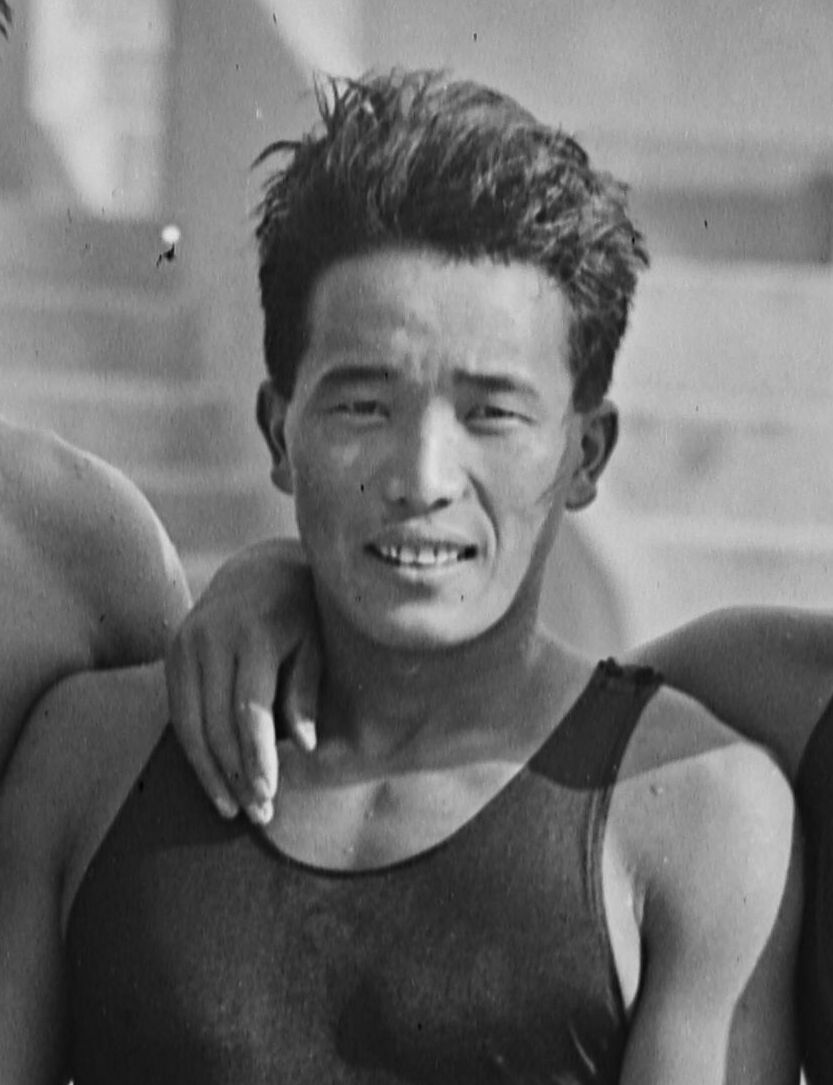

Personal information
- Full name: Saito in 1924
- Born: 14 September 1903
- Died: September 1944 (aged 40–41) Manila, Japanese-occupied Philippines

Sport
- Sport: Swimming

Giyo Saito (斎藤 魏洋, Saitō Giyō; 14 September 1903 – September 1944) was a Japanese swimmer. He competed in two events at the 1924 Summer Olympics. He died during World War II.
