= Vlado Smokvina =

Yugoslav swimmer

Personal information
- Full name: Vladimir Smokvina
- Born: 5 May 1908 Fiume, Austria-Hungary
- Died: 16 April 1982 (aged 73)

Sport
- Sport: Swimming

Vladimir "Vlado" Smokvina (5 May 1908 – 16 April 1982) was a Yugoslav swimmer. He competed in two events at the 1924 Summer Olympics.
