= Samuel Kahanamoku =

American swimmer

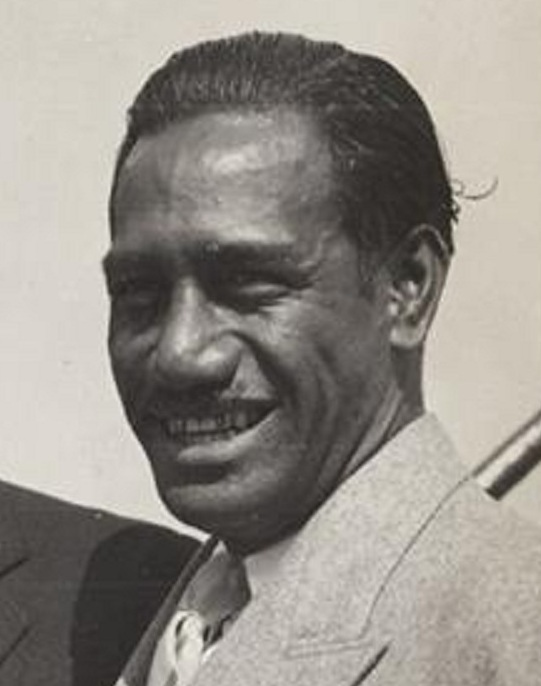

Personal information
- Full name: Samuel Alapai Kahanamoku
- National team: United States
- Born: November 4, 1902 Honolulu, Hawaii
- Died: April 26, 1966 (aged 63) Honolulu, Hawaii, U.S.

Sport
- Sport: Swimming
- Strokes: Freestyle
- Club: Hui Nalu Club
Medal record
Men's swimming
Representing the United States
Olympic Games
Bronze medal – third place	1924 Paris	100 m freestyle

Samuel Alapai Kahanamoku (November 4, 1902 – April 26, 1966) was an American competition swimmer who represented the United States at the 1924 Summer Olympics in Paris, where he won a bronze medal in the men's 100-meter freestyle event. He was the younger brother of surfer and Olympic gold medalist Duke Kahanamoku and the elder brother of Sargent Kahanamoku.

== Biography ==
He was born to Duke Halapu Kahanamoku and Julia Paakonia Paoa in 1902. He was described by his brother Louis to be a "musical savant". Like his elder brother Duke, who was 12 years older than Sam, he was a talented swimmer and surfer. He was also one of the top sprinters in Hawaii. Sam and Duke competed together at the 1924 Summer Olympics in the men's 100-meter freestyle event. Duke came in second at 1:01.4 while Sam came in third at 1:01.8. Sam's daughter Jo-Anne Kahanamoku-Sterling suggested in 2010 that Sam slowed down for his elder brother to overtake him, but Duke Kahanamoku biographer David Davis suggested this to be unlikely since the brothers were separated by three lanes and it would be hard for Sam to judge Duke's progress.

In 1935, the Kahanamoku brothers hosted Doris Duke and her husband James Cromwell, who were visiting Hawaii on her honeymoon tour. Sam taught her how to surf, and acted as her chauffeur, leading to reports that they had become lovers. In 1939, Sam introduced Duke to his future wife, Nadine Alexander. Following his sports career, Samuel Kahanamoku became a real estate agent before he died in 1966.

Kahanamoku had two children by his first wife. He also had an affair with Winifred Powell, a Navy officer’s wife, while they were on SS Lurline. Sonia Vrooman Lien Kahanamoku (September 20, 1935 – March 9, 2016), their daughter, did not know her father's true identity until 2010.

== See also ==
- List of Olympic medalists in swimming (men)
