= Tom Boast =

Australian swimmer

Personal information
- Born: 13 November 1905 Brisbane, Australia
- Died: 19 October 1988 (aged 82)

Sport
- Sport: Swimming

Tom Boast (13 November 1905 – 19 October 1988) was an Australian swimmer. He competed in the men's 100 metre backstroke event at the 1928 Summer Olympics.
