= José Manuel Pinillo =

Spanish swimmer

Personal information
- Born: 8 March 1902 Seville, Spain
- Died: 8 September 1968 (aged 66) Barcelona, Spain

Sport
- Sport: Swimming

José Manuel Pinillo (8 March 1902 – 8 September 1968) was a Spanish freestyle swimmer. He competed in two events at the 1924 Summer Olympics.
