= Jimmy Worthington =

British swimmer

Personal information
- Full name: James Worthington
- Born: 21 January 1904
- Died: 24 August 1976 (aged 72)

Sport
- Sport: Swimming

Jimmy Worthington (21 January 1904 – 24 August 1976) was a British swimmer. He competed in the men's 100 metre backstroke event at the 1924 Summer Olympics.
