= Warren Kealoha =

American swimmer

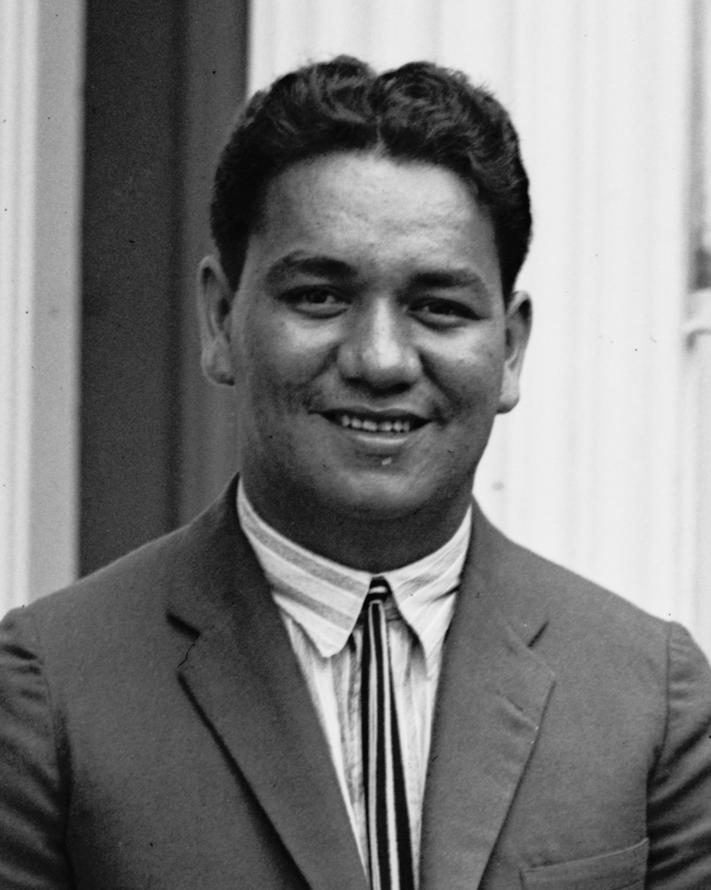
- Kealoha in 1924

Personal information
- Full name: Warren Daniels Kealoha
- National team: United States
- Born: March 3, 1903 Honolulu, Territory of Hawaii, U.S.
- Died: September 8, 1972 (aged 69) Honolulu, Hawaii, U.S.
- Spouse: Eleanor Elvira Ribeiro (1922)

Sport
- Sport: Swimming
- Event: 100 Backstroke
- Strokes: Backstroke
- Club: Hui Makani Club
- Coach: Harvey Chilton (Hui Makani)
Medal record
Men's swimming
Representing the United States
Olympic Games
Gold medal – first place	1920 Antwerp	100 m backstroke
Gold medal – first place	1924 Paris	100 m backstroke

Warren Daniels Kealoha (March 3, 1903 – September 8, 1972) was an American competition swimmer who was an Olympic gold medalist in the 100 backstroke at both 1920 Antwerp and 1924 Paris Olympics and a world record-holder. Kealoha had the distinction of being one of the first athletes to win gold medals in backstroke in consecutive Olympics. As an innovator, he also was noted for being one of the first back strokers to use the flutter kick and an arm stroke with alternate over the head arm entry in elite competition.

== Early life ==
Kealoha was born in Kakaako in greater Honolulu on March 3, 1903. Warren learned to swim in Kewalo Basin, and later swam in Honolulu harbor. He trained and competed with the strong Hui Makani Club under Coach Harvey Chilton. Despite the same surname, Warren was not related to Hawaiian Olympic swimming champion Pua Kealoha, who was one of his teammates with the Hui Makani Club. Kealoha's Coach at Hui Makani, Harvey Chilton, a 2015 Hawaii Hall of Fame inductee, was born in Hawaii, and coached both the well-known Hui Makani and Hui Nalu Swim Clubs during his accomplished career as a coach which spanned over forty years. Kealoha may have done some of his early training in Honolulu Harbor, but large pools such as the Punahou School "tank" pool, the Elizabeth Waterhouse Memorial Tank opened in 1922, and the Waikīkī War Memorial Natatorium opened in 1927, were available in greater Honolulu for training. 1920 freestyle silver medalist Ludy Langer, who swam for Harvey Chilton's rival Hui Nalu Club, was a contemporary of Kealoha.

=== Education ===
Kealoha attended greater Honolulu's Punahou School, which had one of the area's earliest pools, and greater Honolulu's St. Louis College, now known as St. Louis School. St. Louis College, prior to 1920, when Kealoha likely attended, was more a preparatory school than a degree-granting University. Film star Buster Crabbe, who grew up in Hawaii, and competed during Kealoha's later swimming career, graduated the Punahou School, and won a bronze medal in the 1500 meter swim at the 1928 Olympics.

Proficient in the freestyle, Kealoha won the American Athletic Union 50-yard freestyle twice. Best known for his dominance in American backstroke competition, Kealoha retained the record in the 100-meter backstroke for a full six years until losing it to swimming great Johnny Weissmuller in 1926.

== 1920, 1924 Olympics ==
As one of the youngest U.S. Olympic swim team members at 17, Kealoha won the 100-meter backstroke event at the August, 1920 Antwerp Olympics in a world record time of 1:14.8. With his use of the overhead backstroke, Warren later claimed in an interview that he was nearly disqualified in his first Olympic competition, but noted his stroke was later ruled legal, as he remained on his back which was the primary rule requirement. Many European backstrokers of the era used a scissors kick rather than the flutter kick and entered the water with both arms simultaneously, rather than alternately as Warren, and other Hawaiian swimmers did. Warren's backstroke style is now used universally in competition.

He won the 100-meter backstroke again at 1924 Paris Olympics with a time of 1:13.2. Kealoha was known for being one of the first backstroke swimmers to use the overhead stroke, and was one of the first backstrokers to win in consecutive Olympics. During his career, Kealoha set four world records, first at the 1920 Olympics and last in Honolulu in 1926, which was beaten the next day by Walter Laufer. Kealoha's best-known Hawaiian Olympic teammate who competed for the U.S. in both the 1920 and 1924 Olympics was Duke Kahanamoku, and film star Johnny Weismuller was a 1924 U.S. Olympic teammate who won three gold medals in freestyle events that year.

Kealoha married Eleanor Elvira Ribeiro at 2:00 pm on July 22, 1922 in greater Honolulu, spending their honeymoon at the Volcano of Kilauea in Hilo, Hawaii. The couple had children together, though they divorced and Eleanor later remarried.

=== Post swimming life ===
After retiring from swimming, Kealoha became a rancher. He was known for avoiding publicity and enjoying his privacy, and become less widely known after his swimming retirement. Kealoha was inducted into the International Swimming Hall of Fame as an "Honor Swimmer" in December 1968.

Kealoha died September 8, 1972 after a long illness at Kuakini Hospital in Honolulu. Services were held at the Masonic temple on Honolulu's Makiki Street. Warren Kealoha was survived by his wife Eleanor who died in 1983, four children, and grandchildren.

== See also ==
- List of members of the International Swimming Hall of Fame
