= Sven Thaulow =

Norwegian swimmer

Personal information
- Nationality: Norwegian
- Born: 24 October 1905; Trondheim
- Died: 17 September 1967 (aged 61)

Sport
- Sport: Swimming

Sven Thaulow (24 October 1905 – 17 September 1967) was a Norwegian backstroke sport swimmer.

He was born in Trondheim. He competed at the 1924 Summer Olympics, where he reached the semi-finals.
