= Édouard Vanzeveren =

French swimmer

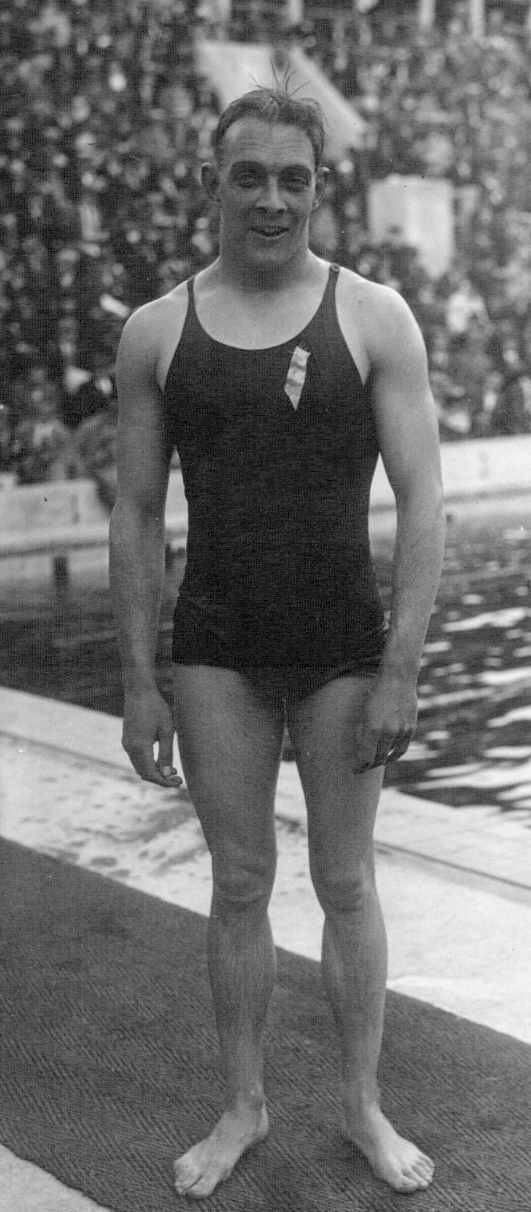
- Édouard Vanzeveren in 1927

Personal information
- Born: 27 April 1905 Melbourne, Australia
- Died: 12 May 1948 (aged 43) Tourcoing, France

Sport
- Sport: Swimming
- Club: EN Tourcoing

Édouard Vanzeveren (27 April 1905 – 12 May 1948) was a French freestyle swimmer. He competed at the 1924 Summer Olympics in the 100 m, 400 m and 4 × 200 m relay events, but failed to reach the finals.
