= William Karlsen =

Norwegian swimmer

Personal information
- Nationality: Norwegian
- Born: 26 July 1910 Sarpsborg, Norway
- Died: 5 October 1986 (aged 76)

Sport
- Sport: Swimming

William Karlsen (26 July 1910 – 5 October 1986) was a Norwegian backstroke swimmer. He was born in Sarpsborg. He competed at the 1932 Summer Olympics in Los Angeles. He was awarded the King's Cup in 1931, 1933, 1934 and 1936.
