= George Kojac =

American swimmer (1910–1996)

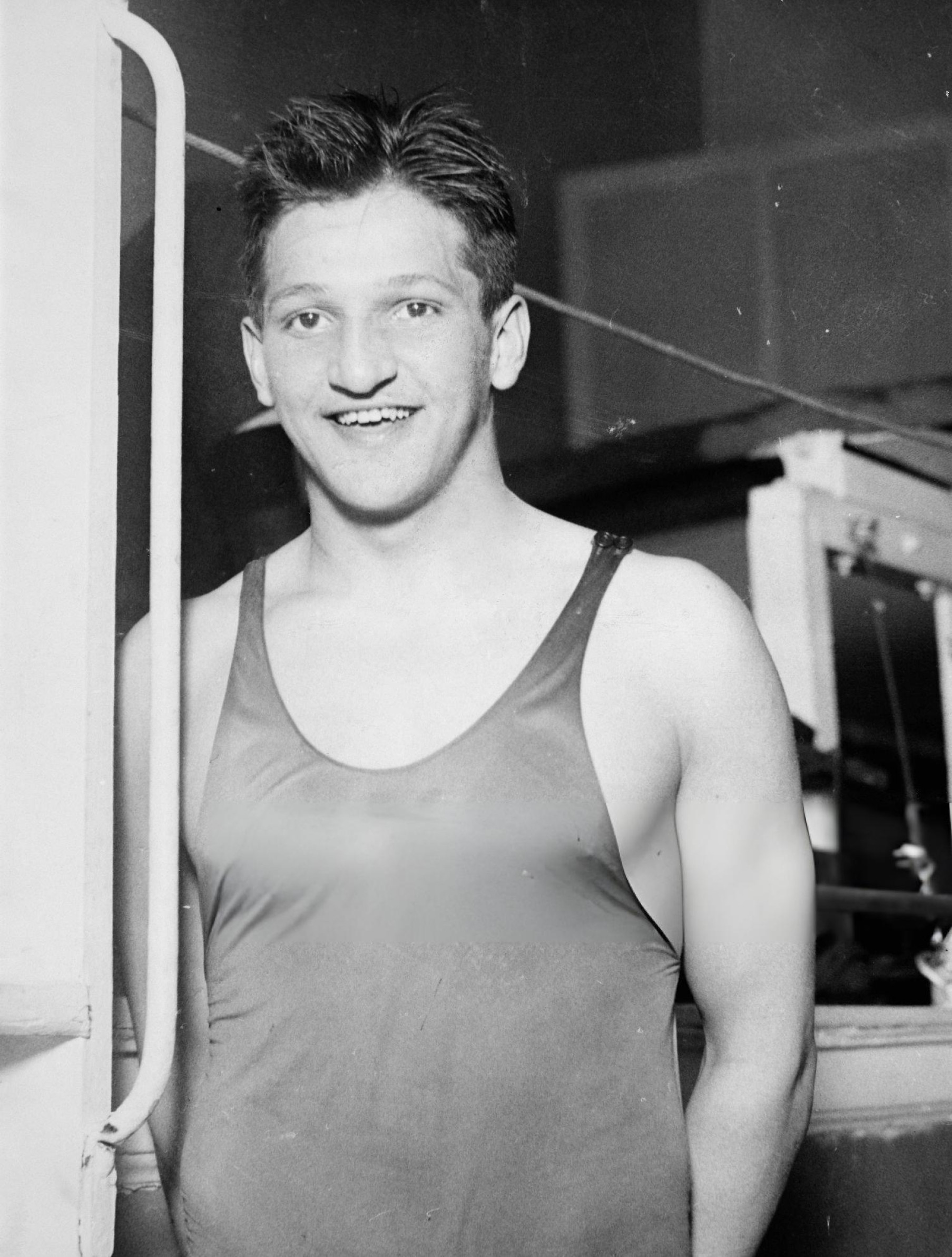
- Kojac in 1928

Personal information
- Full name: George Harold Kojac
- National team: United States
- Born: March 2, 1910 New York, New York, U.S.
- Died: May 28, 1996 (aged 86) Fairfax, Virginia, U.S.

Sport
- Sport: Swimming
- Strokes: Backstroke, freestyle
- Club: Boys' Club of New York
- College team: Rutgers University
Medal record
Men's swimming
Representing United States
Olympic Games
Gold medal – first place	1928 Amsterdam	100 m backstroke
Gold medal – first place	1928 Amsterdam	4×200 m freestyle

George Harold Kojac (March 2, 1910 – May 28, 1996) was an American competition swimmer, two-time Olympic champion, and former world record-holder in two events.

Kojac represented the United States at the 1928 Summer Olympics in Amsterdam. As a member of the winning U.S. team in the 4×200-meter freestyle relay, he received a gold medal. Kojac and teammates Austin Clapp, Walter Laufer and Johnny Weissmuller set a new world record of 9:36.2 in the event final. Individually, he won another gold medal in the men's 100-meter backstroke with a second world record time of 1:08.2. He also finished fourth in the men's 100-meter freestyle in 1:00.8.

Kojac was born to Ukrainian immigrants. He attended DeWitt Clinton High School, and learned to swim in the East River in New York. In 1931 he graduated from the Rutgers University and missed the 1932 Olympics because of his studies at Columbia Medical School. During his swimming career Kojac set 23 world records. In 1968 he was inducted into the International Swimming Hall of Fame.

== See also ==
- List of members of the International Swimming Hall of Fame
- List of Olympic medalists in swimming (men)
- List of Rutgers University people
- World record progression 100 metres backstroke
- World record progression 4 × 200 metres freestyle relay
