= Walter Laufer =

American swimmer (1906 – 1984)

Walter A. Laufer
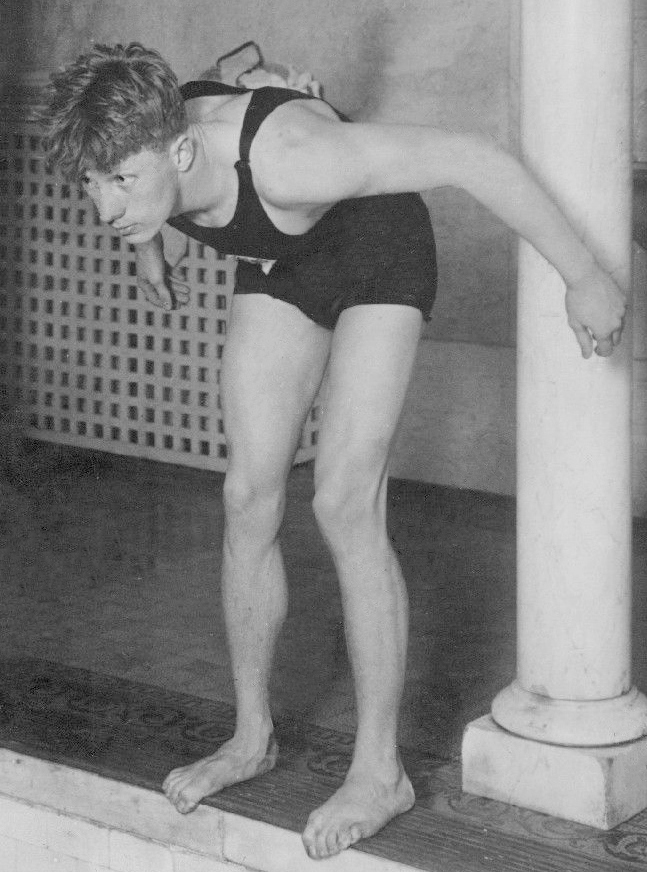
- Laufer in 1926

Personal information
- Full name: Walter Adam Laufer
- National team: United States
- Born: July 5, 1906 Cincinnati, Ohio, U.S.
- Died: July 16, 1984 (aged 78) Midland, Texas, U.S.
- Spouses: Geneivieve Kleinofen (1929); Marion Hengestenberg (1936); Wanda Cord Bockhorst (1974)

Sport
- Sport: Swimming
- Strokes: Freestyle; Backstroke
- Club: Cincinnati YMCA; Chicago Lakeshore A.C.
- Coach: Fred Pfiefer (East High School); Stanley Brauninger (Cincinnati Y, Lakeshore AC)
Medal record
Representing the United States
Olympic Games
Gold medal – first place	1928 Amsterdam	4×200 m freestyle
Silver medal – second place	1928 Amsterdam	100 m backstroke

Walter Adam Laufer (July 15, 1906 – July 16, 1984) was an American swimmer for the Cincinnati YMCA and Chicago Lakeshore Athletic Club who competed at the 1928 Summer Olympics in Amsterdam, earning a gold medal in the 4x200-meter relay and a silver in the 100-meter backstroke events. After leaving competition in 1930, he was employed by the Cincinnati Chemical Company, which became the Toms River Chemical Company of Tom's River New Jersey. While working for Toms River Chemical in New Jersey, he ascended to the title of General Foreman before his retirement.

== Early life and swimming ==
Walter A. Laufer was born July 5, 1906, in Cincinnati, Ohio, to Christian Jacob and Ida Walter Laufer. He attended Cincinnati East High School in Hyde Park, now Withrow High School, where he was a member of Scouting Troop 31, the East High Scout Legion. While swimming for East High, he was coached by Fred Pfiefer, who also coached swimming for Cincinnati's Fenwick Club, under whose colors Laufer competed in his late teens.

On August 25, 1923, Laufer won the four mile, 80-yard Ohio River Marathon Swim in a time of 1:20.50, taking an early lead and defeating the former winner John Moore of Indianapolis by six minutes and around a quarter mile distance. He won the event again in 1924.

Continuing to train after High School, he competed under Stanley Brauninger for the Cincinnati YMCA and later the Lakeshore Athletic Club. On July 30, 1925, at the AAU National Championships Laufer broke the 220-yard backstroke record in Seattle, Washington, with a time of 2:50, leading the Cincinnati YMCA to lead their rival the Illinois Athletic Club.

== Pre-Olympic competition highlights ==
Rising to national prominence at San Francisco's National Outdoor AAU Swimming Championships in 1924, he won the individual medley and backstroke events. In 1925, he again performed well at the Seattle AAU National Outdoor Championships, placing first in the 225-yard backstroke event.

=== 1926 AAU U.S. National Championships ===
In 1926, at the U.S. National Championships in Chicago, showing his diverse stroke skills while swimming for the Cincinnati Athletic Club, he was an Indoor AAU Champion in the 100-yard freestyle, the 150-yard backstroke, the Pentathlon (100m in each stroke plus 400m freestyle and diving), and the 300-yard individual medley swim. In a remarkable margin of victory at nationals that year, he scored the most points of any competitor, and his individual score was higher than the combined score of any other team. In the last or anchor leg of the 4x100-meter freestyle he outpaced 1924 Olympic gold medalist Johnny Weissmuller, becoming one of the few swimmers to ever defeat Wiesmuller at the 100-meter distance.

A multi-stroke swimmer, Laufer held ten AAU indoor titles that included freestyle, backstroke and Individual Medley events.

After his win in the 1926 AAU nationals in Chicago, he competed for the U.S. team during their travels in Asia and Europe. During his 1926 international tour, while competing in meets in just over 20 cities in Europe, in a three week period, he placed first in all but one of his swimming competitions. During that 1926 European tour, he established a new record for the 100m backstroke, and set three more for the 200-meter distance.

== 1928 Amsterdam Olympics ==
At the 1928 Olympics, Laufer won a gold medal in 4×200 m freestyle relay, with his relay team recording a combined time of 9:36.2. His relay teammates included freestyle Olympic gold medalist and Tarzan actor Johnny Weissmuller, George Kojac and Austin Clapp.

In individual events, he won a silver in the Men's 100-meter backstroke with a time of 1:10.0. Paul Wyatt won the bronze medal with a time of 1:12.0 for his third-place finish. The Americans swept the event finals with George Kojac winning the gold with a time of 1:08.2. Kojac performed exceptionally well in backstroke in the second half of 1926, setting a world record while attending High School.

Laufer was also fifth in the 100-meter freestyle event. Chicago coach Bill Bachrach coached the U.S. Men's Olympic swim team that year.

By the completion of his swimming career in 1930, Laufer had earned 19 national titles, and set 4 world records.

== Late personal and professional life ==
Laufer was married three times. His first marriage was to Genevieve Kleinofen around 1929, and the couple had a son and a daughter. Genevieve contracted intestinal influenza from which she died of complications on January 8, 1934. In 1936, Laufer had one daughter with Marion Hengestenberg, whom he married in 1936. Married 36 years, his second wife Marion died suddenly in 1972. In 1974, Walter married Wanda Cord Bockhorst, a widow living in Cincinnati.

In later life, Laufer was employed by the Cincinnati Chemical Company, later known as Toms River Chemical, serving as a General Foreman for Toms River Chemical of Toms River, Jersey, prior to his retirement.

He died at 78 on July 16, 1984 in Midland, Texas at the home of his son Walter Jr., and was buried in the Spring Grove Cemetery in Cincinnati, Ohio. He was survived by his wife Wanda, son Walter Jr., two daughters, and seven grandchildren. Services were held July 19 at Spring Grove's Norman Chapel.

== Honors ==
With his exceptional performance as high points scorer at the Chicago AAU National Championships in 1926, journalists selected Laufer as "Swimmer of the Year". In a more distinctive honor, he was inducted into the International Swimming Hall of Fame as an "Honor Swimmer" in 1973. As a former local hero, in a posthumous honor in August 1984, the city of Cincinnati presented Laufer's wife Wanda with a certificate for Walter's participation in the 1928 Olympics.

== See also ==
- List of members of the International Swimming Hall of Fame
- List of Olympic medalists in swimming (men)
- World record progression 4 × 200 metres freestyle relay
