= Emil Zeibig =

French swimmer

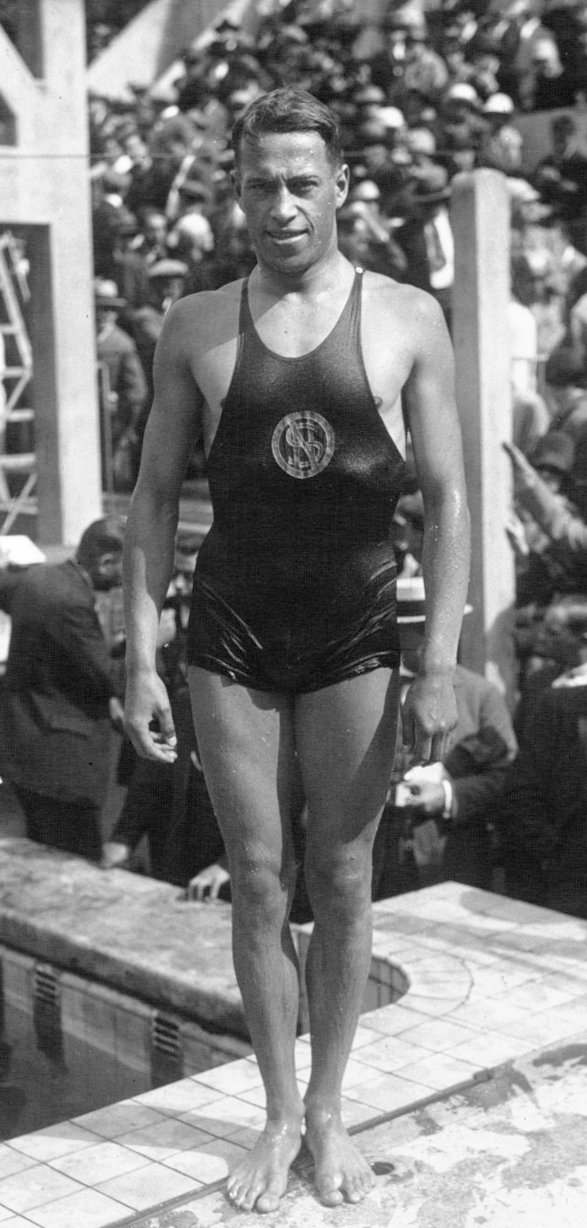
- Emil Zeibig in 1927

Personal information
- Born: 10 September 1904 Strasbourg, France
- Died: 8 July 1981 (aged 76)

Sport
- Sport: Swimming
- Strokes: backstroke, freestyle
- Club: SN Strasbourg

Ernst Emil Georg Zeibig (10 September 1904 – 8 July 1981) was a French swimmer who competed at the 1924 and 1928 Summer Olympics. In 1924 he was eliminated in the heats of 100 m backstroke and 100 m and 4 × 200 m freestyle events. In 1928 he competed only in backstroke, and again failed to reach the final.
