= Shinikei Haniwa Production Site =

Shinike Haniwa Production Site
- 新池埴輪製作遺跡 (Japanese)
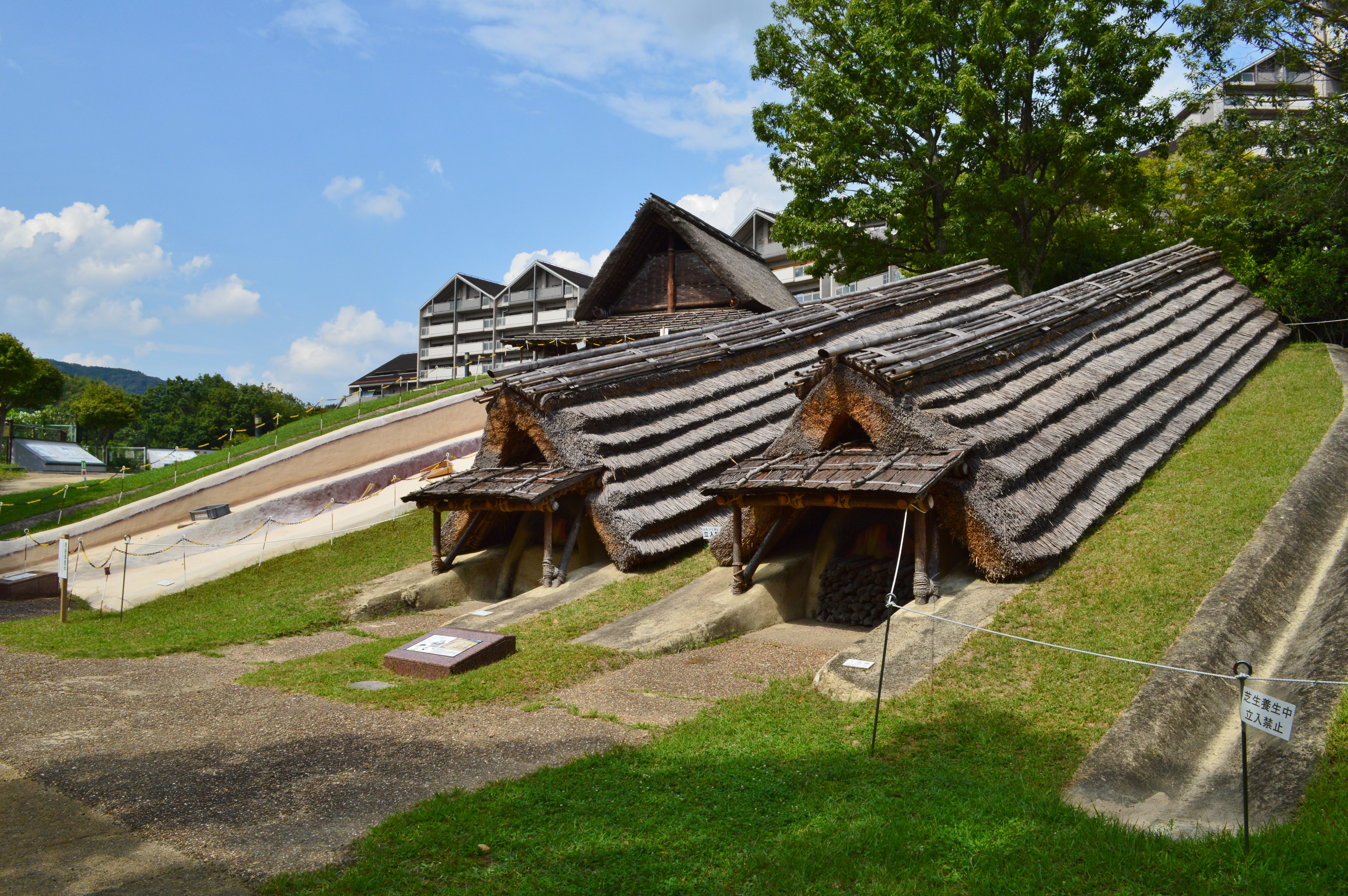
- Shinike Haniwa Production Site

- Shinike Haniwa Production Site Shinikei Haniwa Production Site (Japan)
- Interactive map of Shinike Haniwa Production Site
- 34°51′14.1″N 135°35′4.6″E
- Periods: Kofun period
- Location: Takatsuki, Osaka Japan
- Region: Kansai region

History
- Built: 5th century to the 6th century AD

Site notes
- Area: 4,163 m^{2} (44,810 sq ft)
- Public access: Yes (public park)

The Shinikei Haniwa Production Site (新池埴輪製作遺跡, Shinike haniwa seisaku iseki) is an archaeological site with the ruins of a large-scale Kofun period factory for the production of haniwa clay funerary pottery, located in what is now the city of Takatsuki in Osaka Prefecture in the Kansai region of Japan. Collectively with the neighboring Imashirozuka Kofun, it received protection as a National Historic Site in 2006.

== Overview ==
The Shinike site is located about 1.5 kilometers west of Imashirozuka Kofun and is one of the oldest and largest haniwa production sites in Japan. It which was in operation for about 100 years from the mid-5th century to the mid-6th century. The site contains the remains of 18 kilns, three workshop, and a village of workers. It is believed to have been established by toraijin immigrants from Silla around 450 AD as mention in an entry in the Nihon Shoki on the 23rd year of the reign of Emperor Kinmei. The haniwa for the Ōta Chausuyama Kofun were made during this initial phase. The site was expanded in 480 AD, when haniwa for many kofun in the surrounding area was produced. A third expansion occurred around 530 AD, during which time the haniwa for the neighboring Imashirozuka Kofun were made. However, production ended around 550 AD for unknown reasons, and the site was abandoned.

Archaeological excavations of the site began from 1988, and the area was opened to the public as the "Haniwa Factory Park". The park contains replicas of the 20 types of haniwa (cylindrical, animal, house-shaped, or warrior) which have been found on this site). Two of the workshops have been restored as pit dwellings, and two kilns (one large ad one small) have been recreated as found during the excavation.

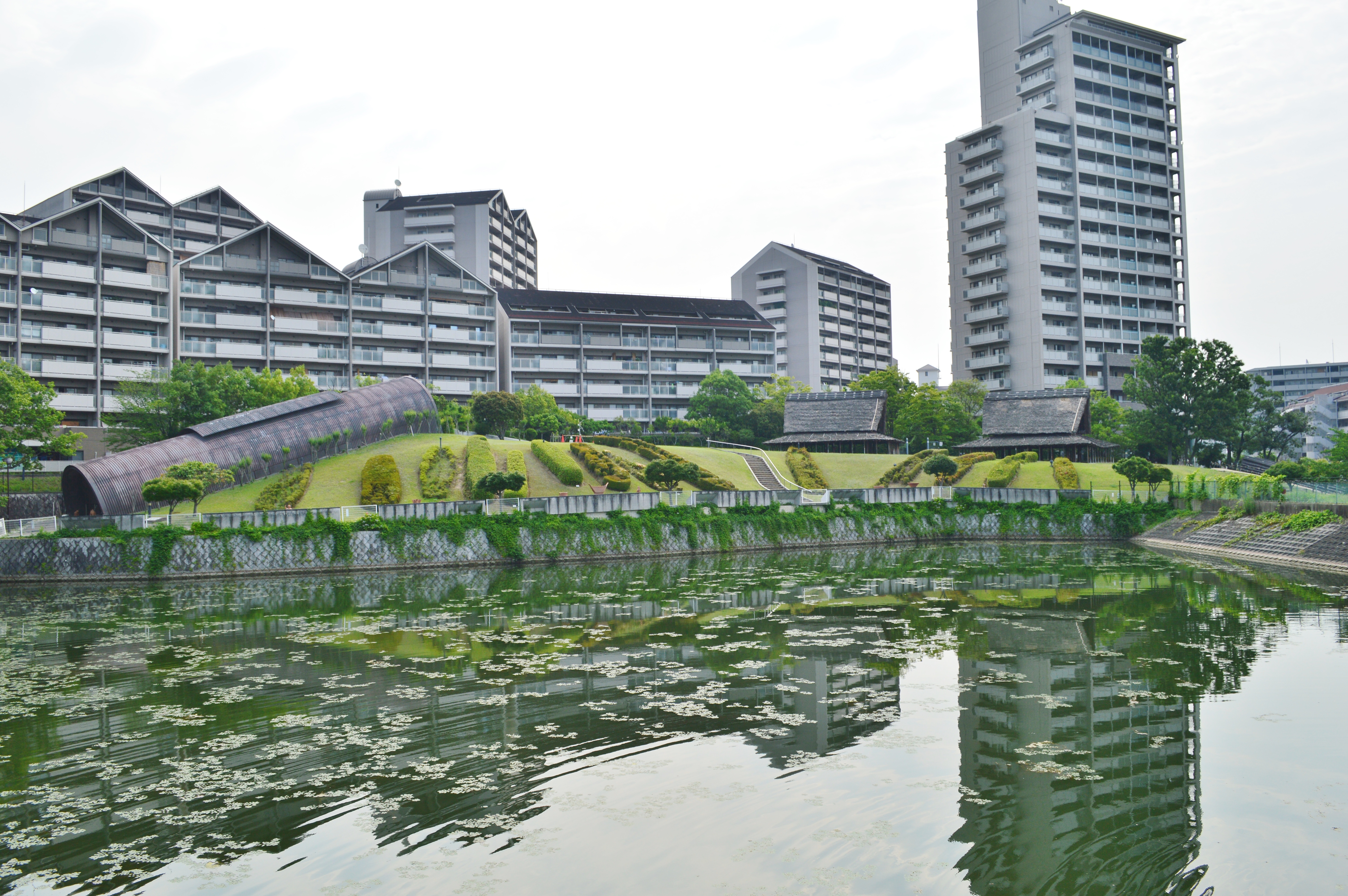
Surrounding area

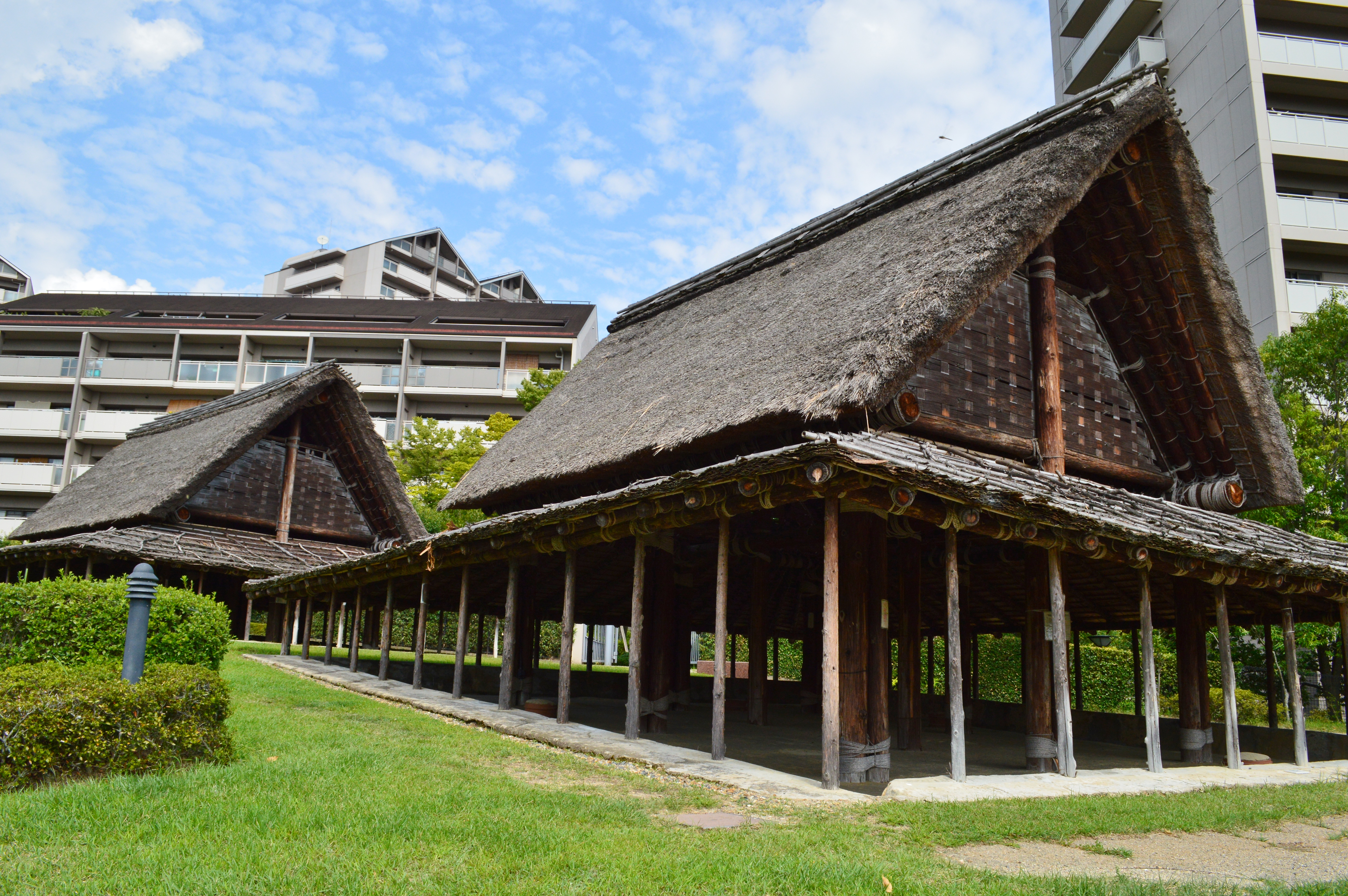
Restored workshops

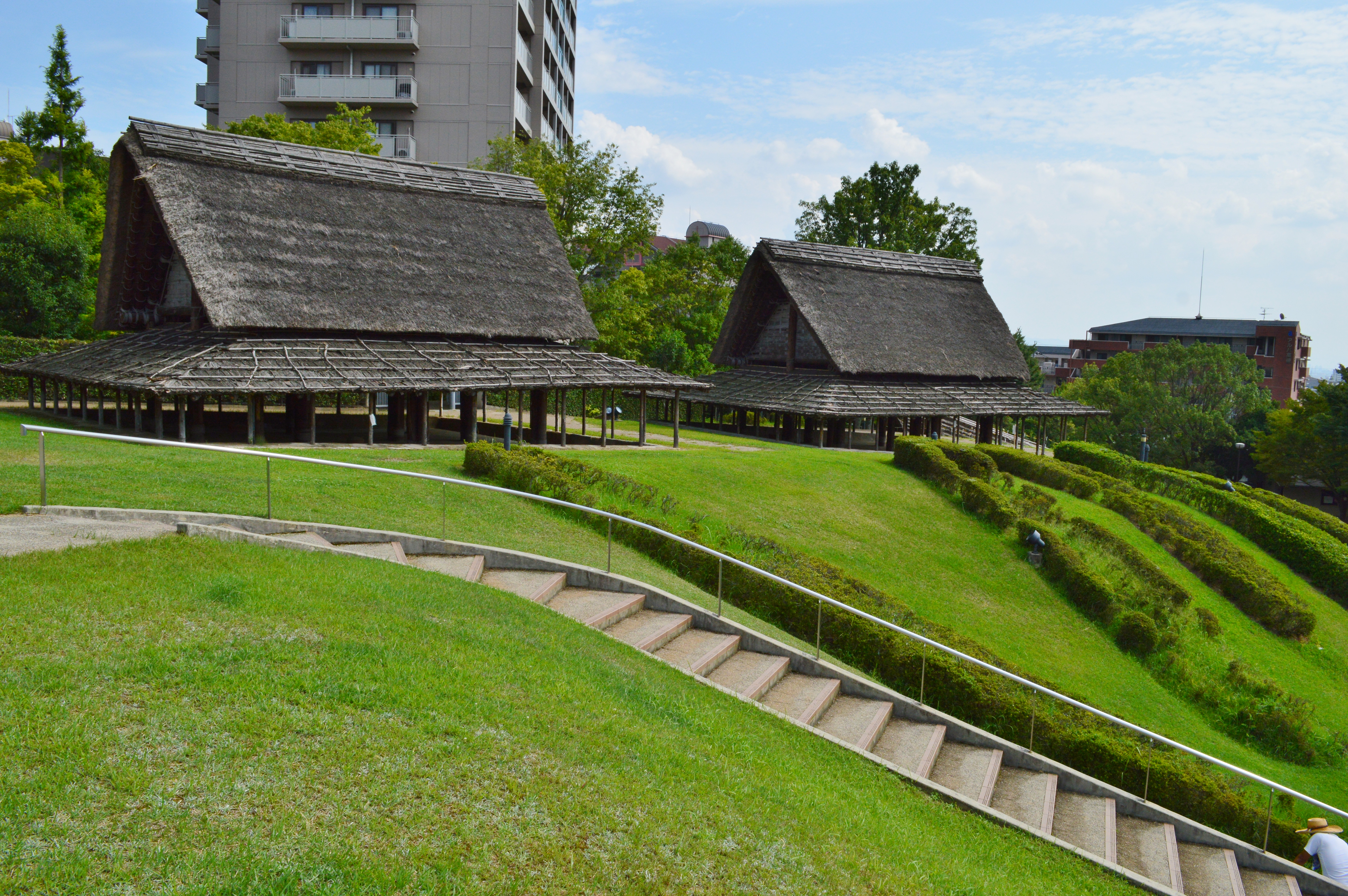
Workshops and kiln ruins

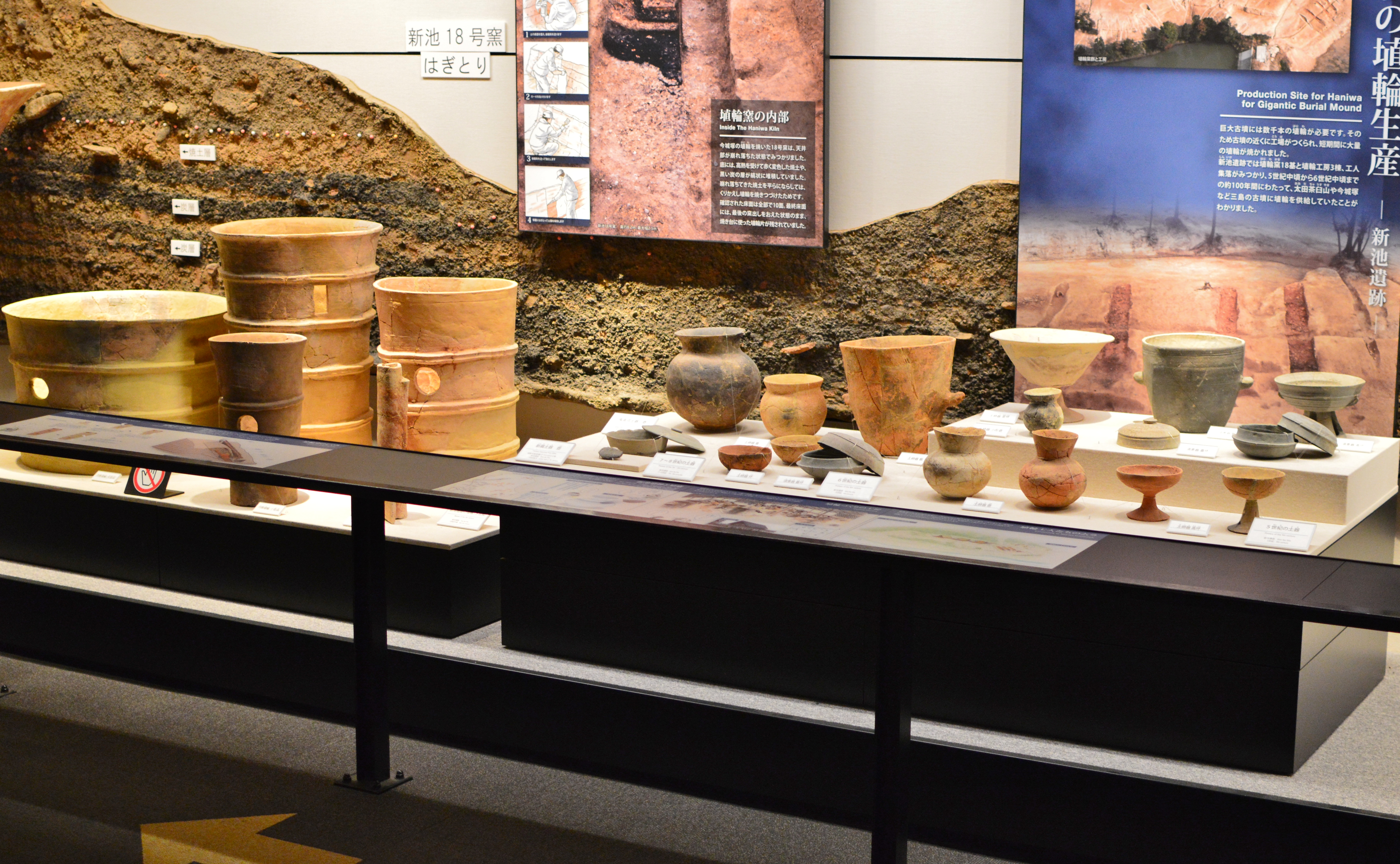
Haniwa found on site

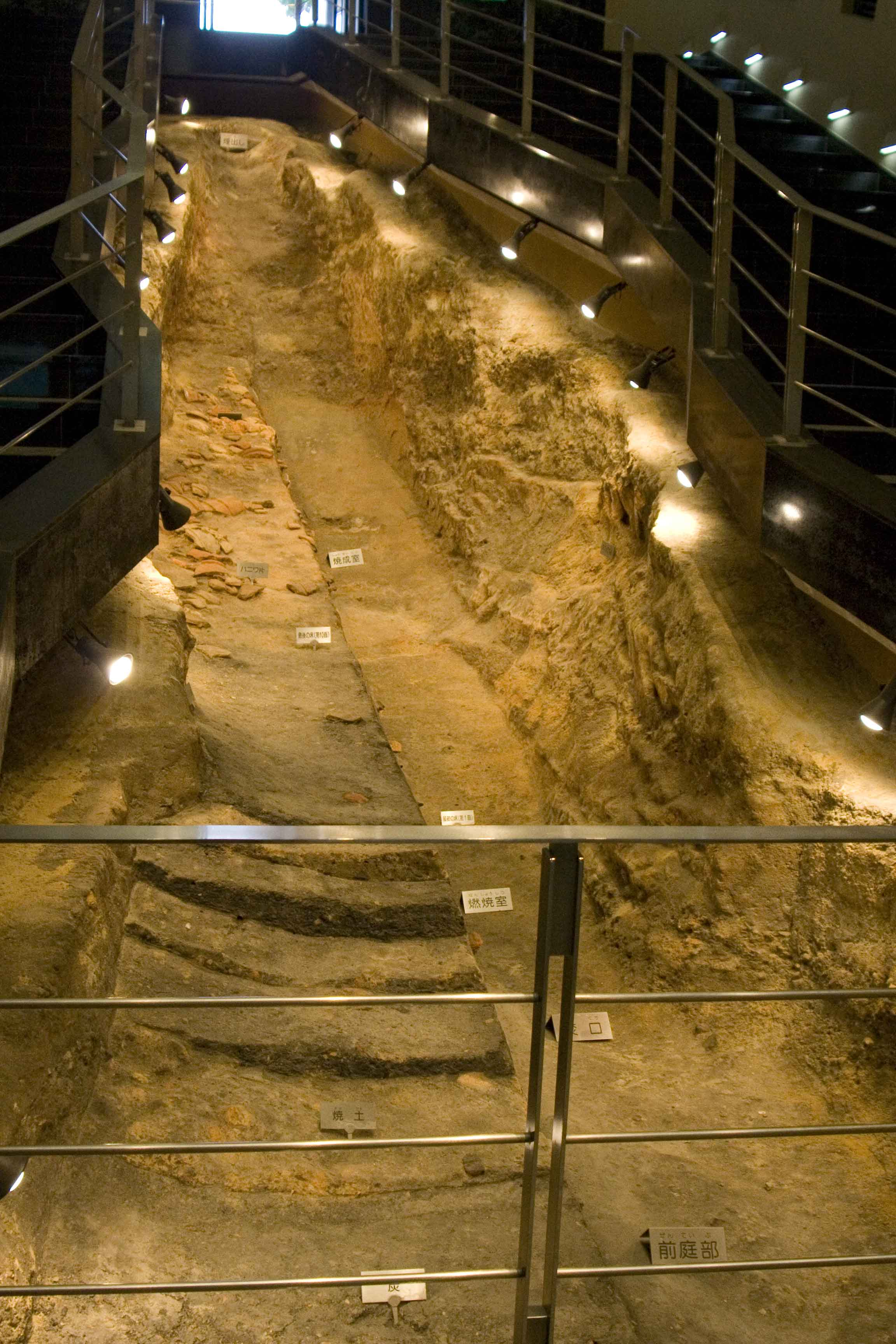
Kin No.18

The site is located about 4.7 kilometers west of Takatsuki Station on the JR West Tokaido Main Line.

== See also ==
- List of Historic Sites of Japan (Osaka)
