= Hokke-ji =

Buddhist temple in Nara, Japan

- 法華寺
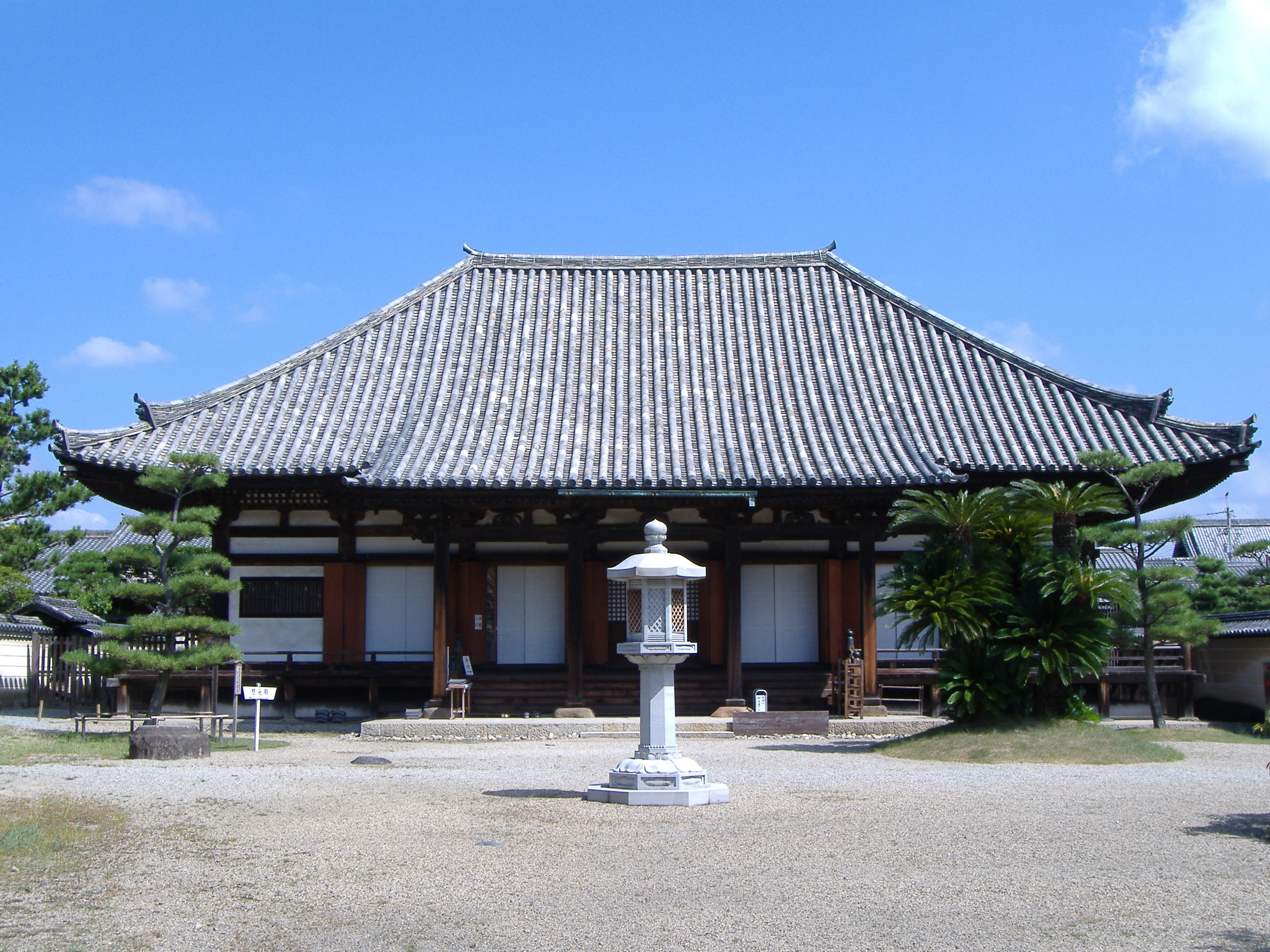
- Hokke-ji Hondo (ICP)

- Hokke-ji Hokke-ji (Japan)

Religion
- Affiliation: Buddhist
- Deity: Jūichimen Kannon
- Rite: Kōmyō

Location
- Location: 882 Hokkeji-chō, Nara-shi, Nara-ken
- Country: Japan
- Coordinates: 34°41′32.64″N 135°48′14.82″E

Architecture
- Founder: Empress Kōmyō
- Completed: 745
- National Treasure of Japan

Website
- https://hokkejimonzeki.or.jp/en/
- National Important Cultural Property National Historic Site of Japan National Place of Scenic Beauty

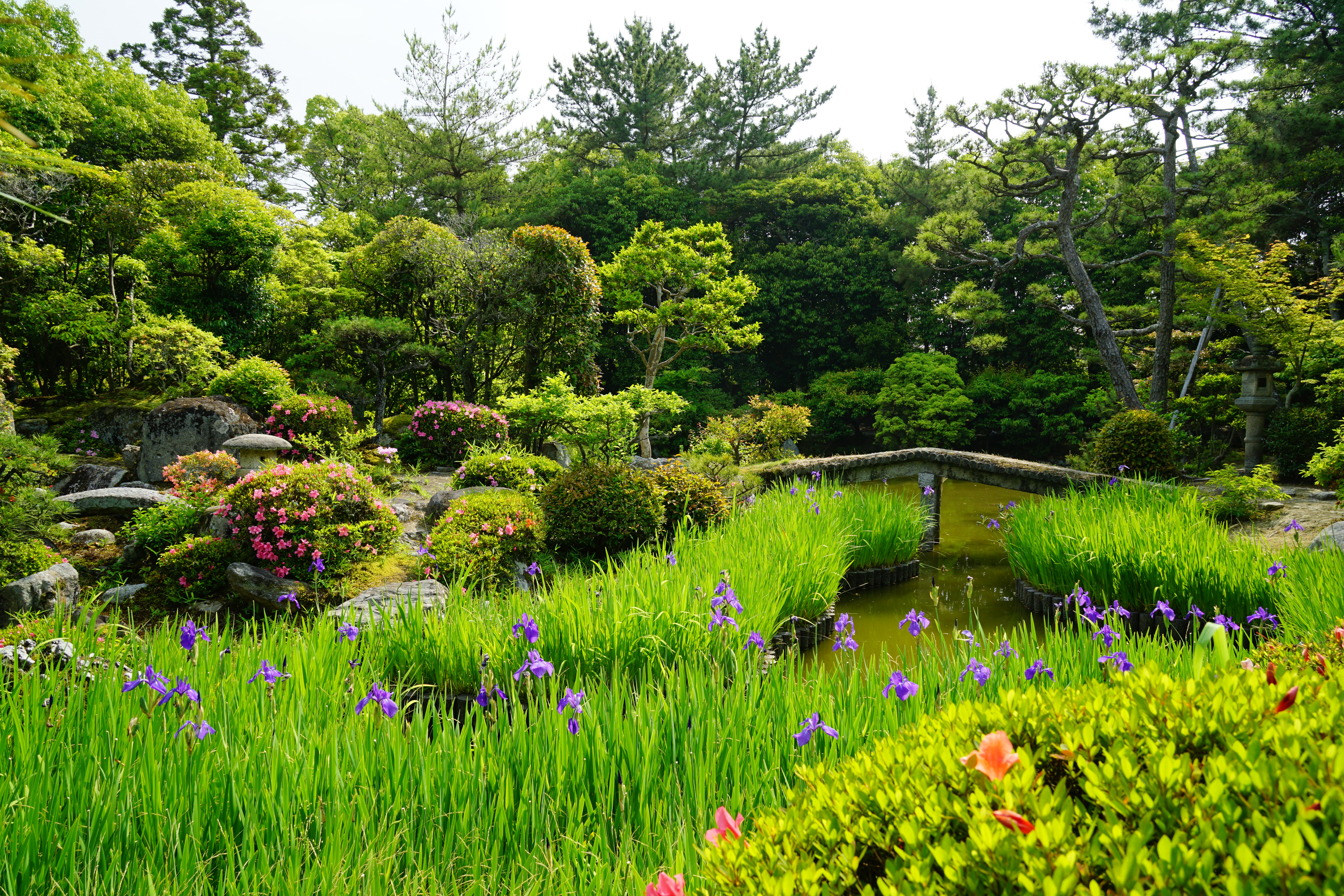
Hokke-ji gardens

Hokke-ji (法華寺, Hokke-ji) is a Buddhist temple located in the Hokkeji neighborhood of the city of Nara, Nara Prefecture, Japan. It is the head temple of the Kōmyō sect (光明宗), named after the temple's founder, Empress Kōmyō. The honzon of the temple is a Heian period standing statue of Jūichimen Kannon, which is a designated National Treasure.

== History ==
The Shoku Nihongi records that in 741, as the country recovered from a major smallpox epidemic, Emperor Shōmu ordered that a monastery and nunnery be established in every province, the kokubunji (国分寺). These temples were built to a semi-standardized template, and served both to spread Buddhist orthodoxy to the provinces, and to emphasize the power of the Nara period centralized government under the Ritsuryō system. The great national monastery of Tōdai-ji was the head temple for this system of kokubunji monasteries, and the monzeki nunnery of Hokke-ji became the head of all the kokubun-niji nunneries.

The site of Hokke-ji was originally the residence of Fujiwara no Fuhito, and after his death, his daughter Empress Kōmyō, inherited it and made it the Imperial Palace. Per the Shoku Nihongi, the empress made it into a temple in May 745; however, two years later, in 747, was when the name "Hokke-ji" appears in historical documentation. There are many unknowns about the details of the founding of the temple, and about the kokubun-niji system itself, including the locations of many of the nunneries, or even if they were all actually constructed. Hokke-ji itself, despite its imperial connections and prestige, took a long time to complete, and it was not until 782 that the government office responsible for its construction abolished.

Archaeological excavations have revealed that the temple grounds occupied a three by two chō area, or one full city block in the city plan of Heijō-kyō, and that it bordered the Tōgū Palace of the Heijō Palace grounds. The original main hall and lecture hall were located further south of the current temple's South Gate, and to the south of the main hall was a Middle Gate and two pagodas south of that. Furthermore, in the southwestern part of the grounds was a sub-temple, the Amida Jōdō-in, which (per the Shoku Nihongi) had an 18-foot tall Amida triad as its honzon, and which was where the first anniversary services after the death of Empress Kōmyō were held in 761.

After the capital was relocated to Heian-kyō Hokke-ji gradually declined, and it was in considerable disrepair by the end of the Heian period. It was damaged in 1180 during Taira no Shigehira's Siege of Nara, but was restored by the monk Chōgen in 1203. A Kamakura period head of the Vairocana Buddha at the temple is believed to be a surviving portion of the honzon statue of that time. Towards the end of the Kamakura period, the temple was restored by Eison and converted to the Shingon Ritsu sect. In the Sengoku period, the temple was burned in 1499 and 1506 by military conflicts, and was also severely damaged by the 1596 Keichō–Fushimi earthquake. The current Main Hall and South Gate were rebuilt in 1601 by Toyotomi Hideyori and his mother, Lady Yodo, and was the bell tower in 1602. During the Edo period, the temple once again became a monzeki nunnery, when Emperor Go-Mizunoo's adopted daughter Takanori took holy orders. The East Pagoda of the temple collapsed in the 1707 Hōei earthquake. In 1999, the temple reverted to its original status as an independent temple and left the Shingon Ritsu sect to become head temple of the Komyō sect, named after Empress Komyō.

The temple houses numerous National Treasures and Important Cultural Properties. The precincts of Hokke-ji, including the remains of the Amida Jōdō-in, were designated a National Historic Site in 2001, with the area under protection expanded in 2015. The remains of a Pure Land garden with a pond have been discovered at the remains of Amida Jodo-in, which the oldest known garden of this kind in Japan. It is also protected as a Nationally Designated Place of Scenic Beauty.

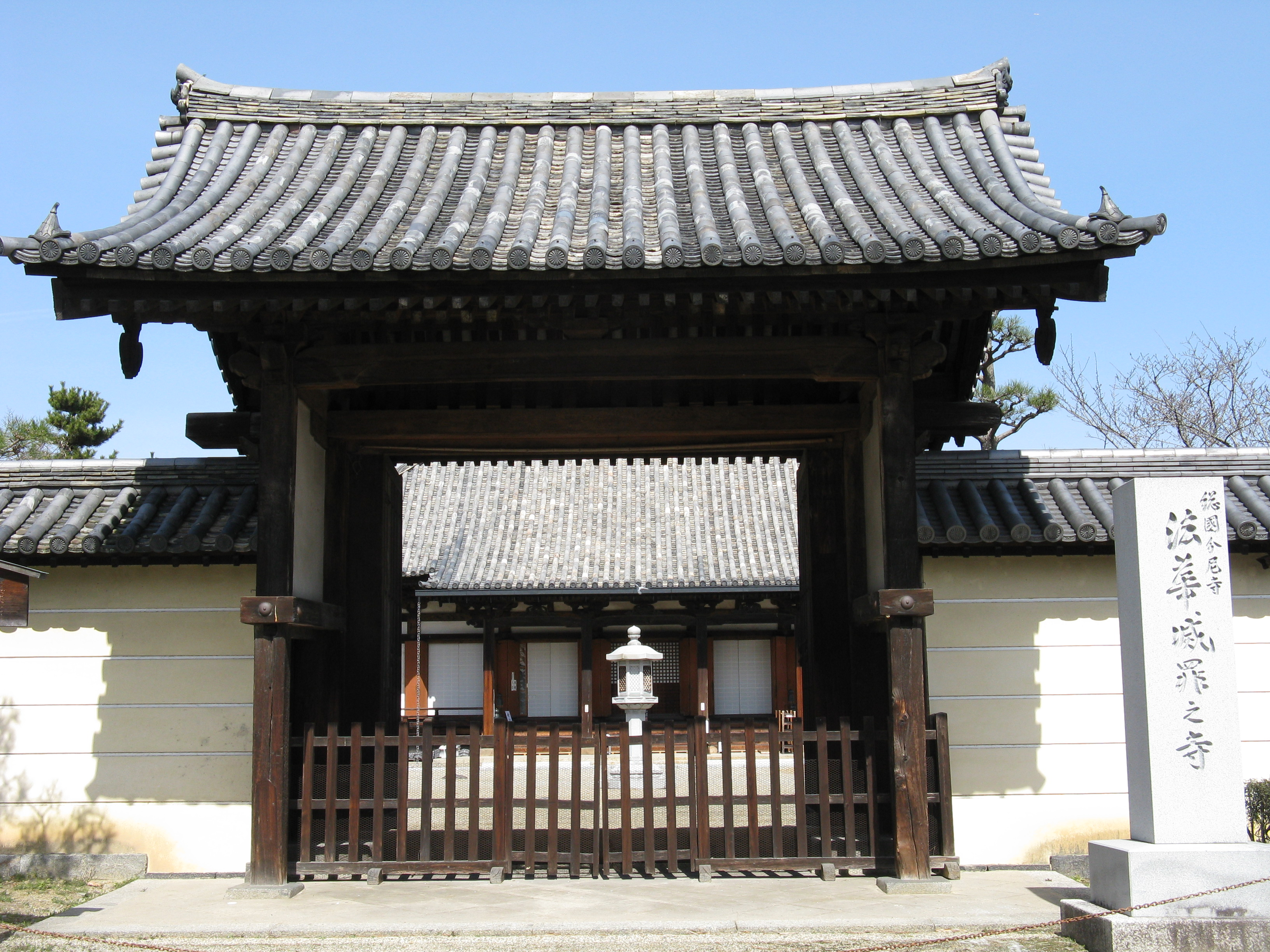
South Gate (ICP)

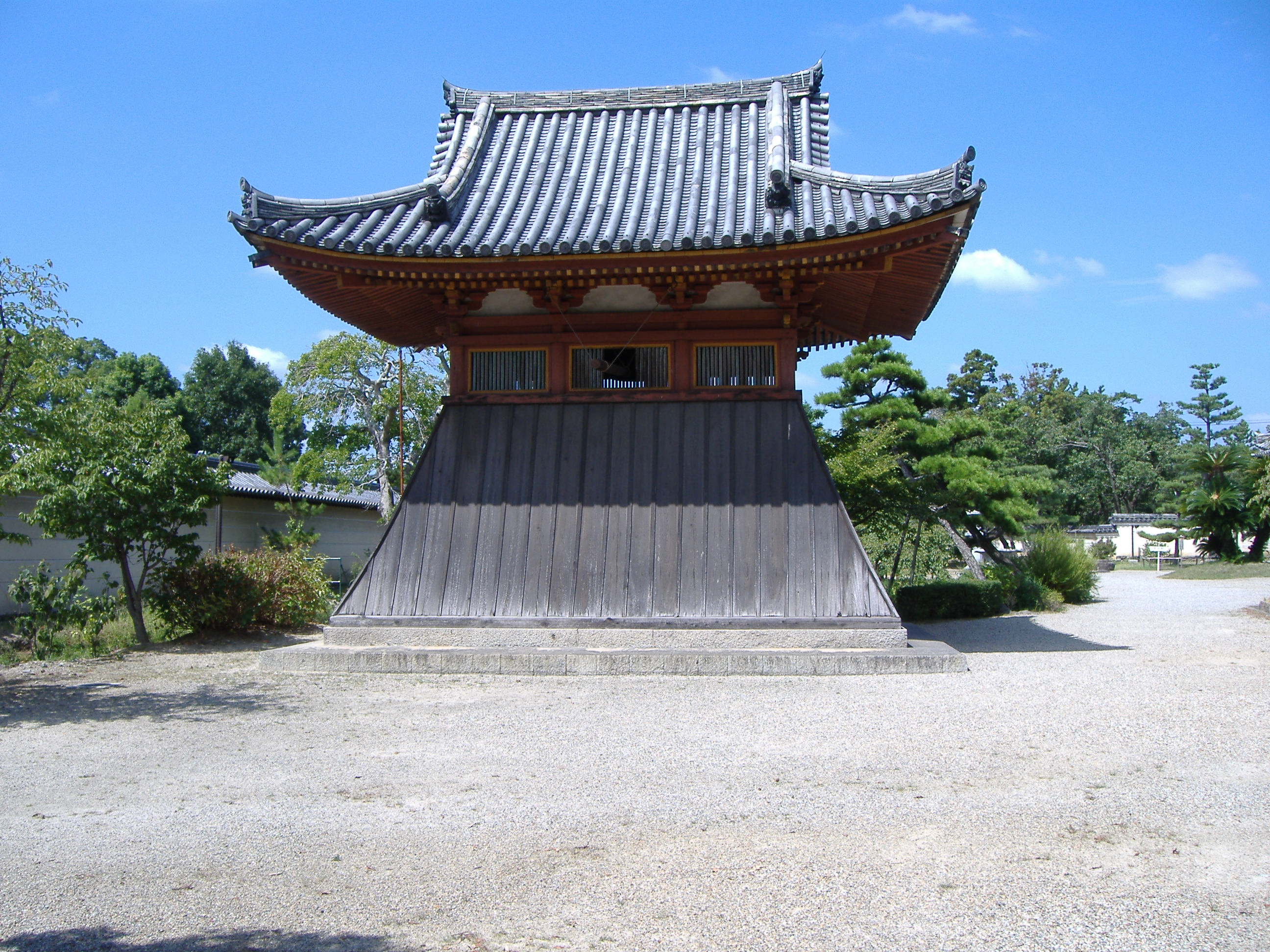
The bell tower (ICP)

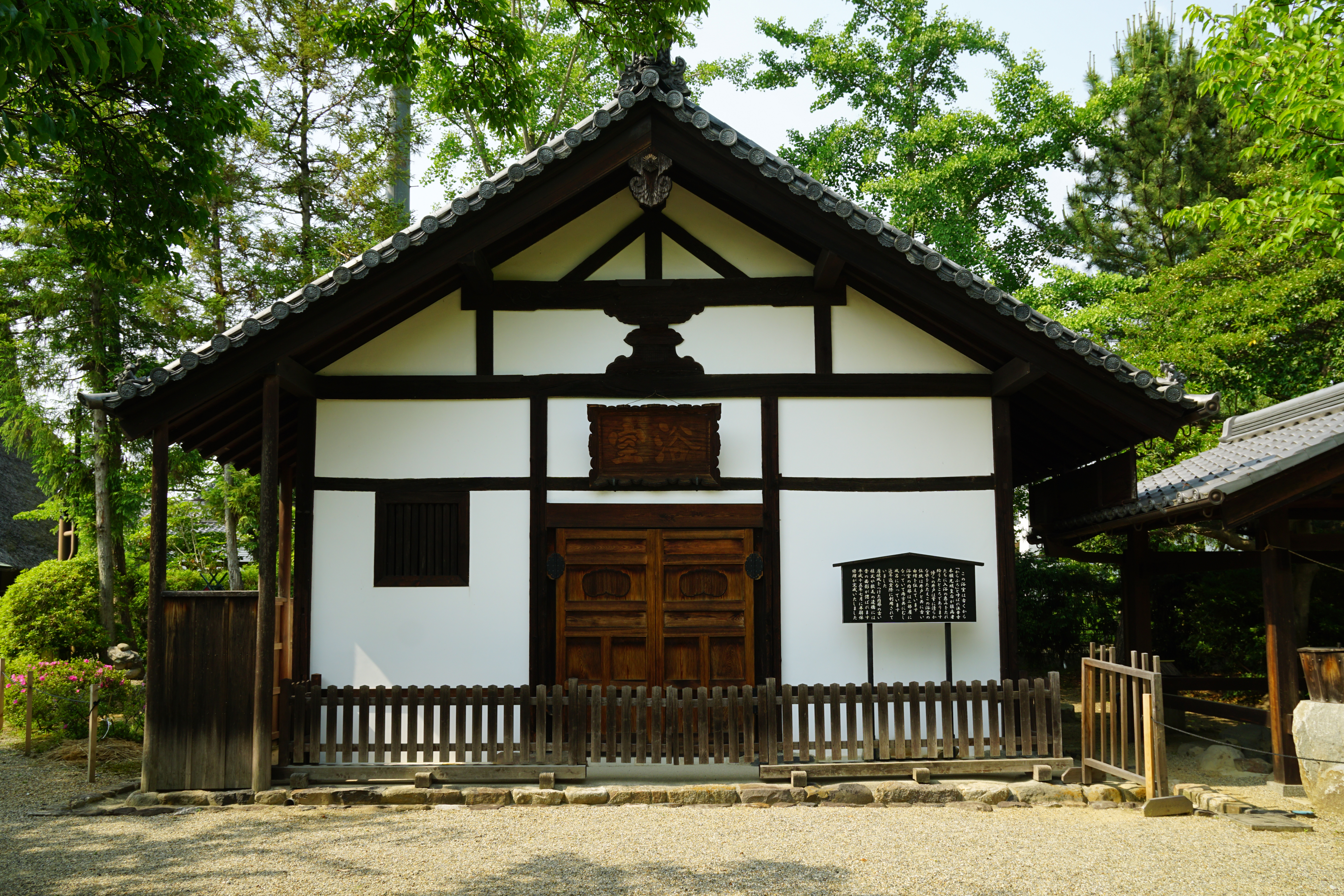
Bath house (Tangible Cultural property)

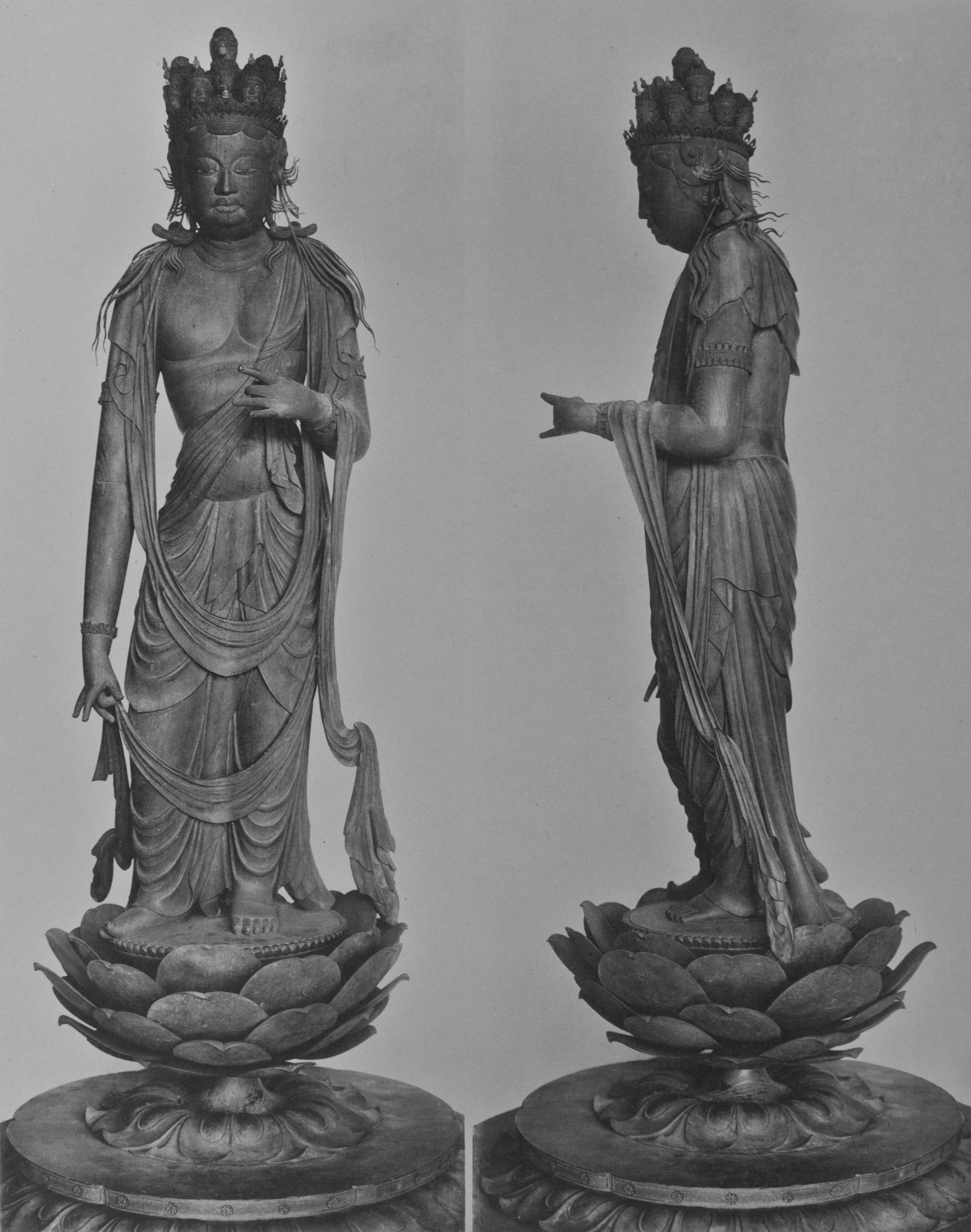
Jūichimen Kannon (NT)

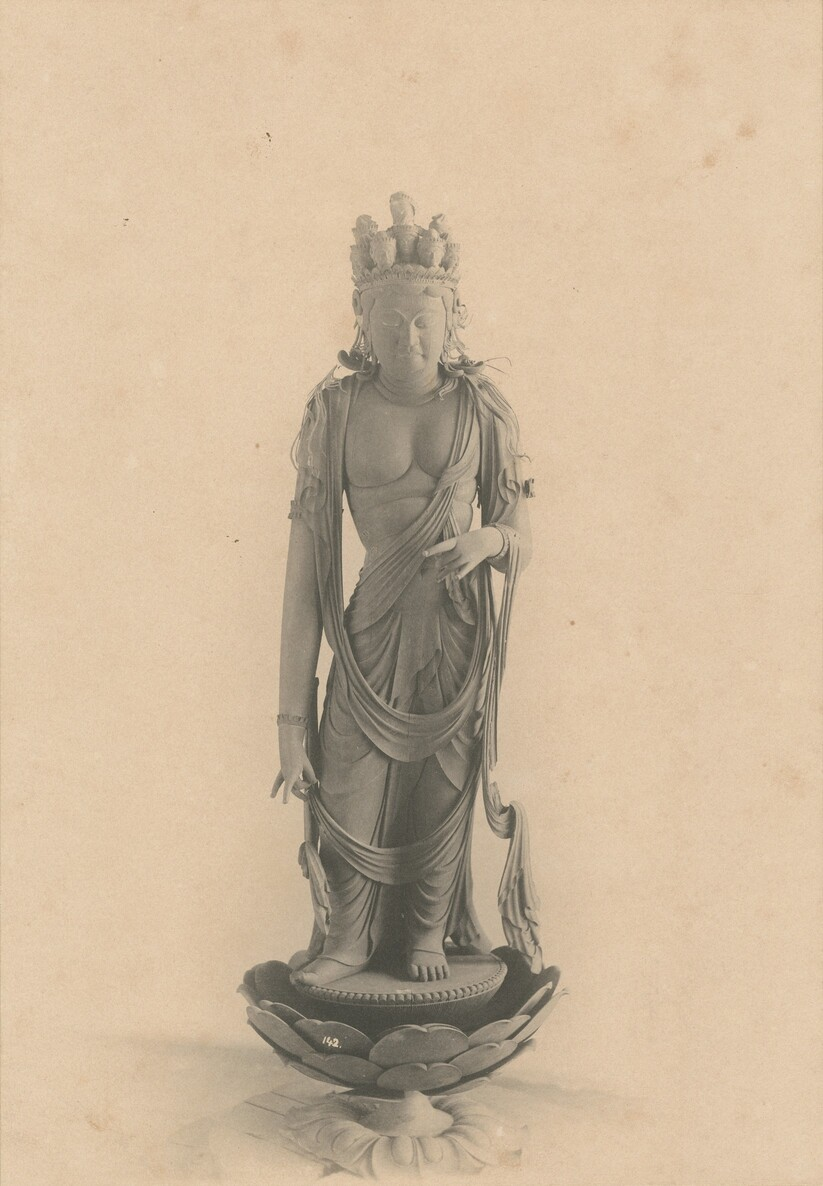
Juichimen Kannon

=== Hokke-ji Jūichimen Kannon ===
The honzon of Hokke-ji is a one-meter tall wooden statue of Jūichimen Kannon, which is designated a National Treasure. A hibutsu hidden image, it is open for public viewing on certain days in spring and autumn. The temple legend states that it was made in the Nara period by a Buddhist sculptor from Gandara in the likeness of Empress Kōmyō, but it is believed to have actually been made in the early Heian period, in the first half of the 9th century.

The statue is made of a single piece of Japanese kaya wood. It is in good condition and is one of the most representative pieces of sculpture from the Heian period. It was made without any coloring or gold leaf from the beginning, and the hair, eyebrows, and beard were painted ultramarine, the lips were painted vermilion, and the whites of the eyes were painted white. Copper plates were used for the eyes, the hair hanging down the shoulders, the crown, and the bracelets, and the rest of the statue is finished in a natural state that makes the most of the beauty of the wood. Apart from a few parts made of different materials, such as the wrists and the loose parts of the heavenly garment, the main parts of the head and body, the center of the lotus throne, and the core below it are carved from a single piece of wood.

The pedestal is an unusual type, with a single thin stem supporting the lotus flower of the statue from the bottom. The halo is also a rare style, depicting the unopened lotus flowers and leaves. It was added in 1905 was based on old drawings. The statue's center of gravity is on the left leg, the right leg is loose, and the first toe of the right foot is slightly raised, as if expressing the moment of taking a step. The extremely long right arm represents the "standing hand and knees upright position," one of the 80 types of Buddha's mudra. The facial expression of this statue, the proportions that emphasize the volume of the chest and thighs, and the fluttering wave pattern of clothing with thick folds alternating with thin, sharp folds are all styles unique to early Heian sculpture.

== Cultural Properties ==
=== National Treasures ===
- Wooden statue of standing Jūichimen Kannon (木造十一面観音立像), Nara period. (described above).
- Wooden statue of seated Yuima koji (木造維摩居士坐像), late Nara period. This statue depicts an elderly philosopher who was a lay disciple of Shakyamuni Buddha. While the realistic facial expression is characteristic of Tenpyo-era sculpture, the powerful stance in the side view shows features that connect to the early Heian period. It is believed to have been created during the late 8th century
- Painted silk scroll of Amida Triad and Attendant Bodhisattva (絹本著色阿弥陀三尊及び童子像), late Heian period to early Kamakura period. This consists of three scrolls: one large scroll depicting only Amida Buddha facing forward, one scroll depicting Kannon and Seishi Bosatsu facing right, and one scroll depicting an attendant holding a banner. The dimensions are 185.5 x 146.1 cm for the Amida scroll, 186.4 x 173.6 cm for the Kannon and Seishi scrolls, and 183.3 x 55.2 cm for the attendant. Differences in style and expression can be seen between the Amida scroll and the other two scrolls; the Amida is depicted statically facing forward, while the Kannon and Seishi and attendant scrolls convey a sense of movement. The Amida image depicts the patterns on his clothing and the lines on the lotus petals of the pedestal using vermilion lines, and does not use gold or silver, whereas the Kannon and Seishi images and the child figures use gold paint and cut gold leaf, and employ muted colors (intermediate colors). Since all the deities are depicted on clouds, it is thought that this work was created as an Amida Raigo painting, but the mudra of the Amida Buddha is the preaching mudra, not the welcoming mudra. The fact that the Seishi Bosatsu is depicted holding a banner canopy rather than with hands clasped is also iconographically unique. For these reasons, there are various theories as to these three scrolls should be considered a set, and in what place and for what purpose they were used. They are on deposit at the Nara National Museum.

=== Important Cultural Properties ===
- Hondō (本堂), early Edo period. Rebuilt in 1601 by Toyotomi Hideyori and Lady Yodo with Katagiri Katsumoto as the magistrate, this structure has a hipped roof and is covered with traditional roof tiles. It has seven bays on the front and four bays on the sides. The ornamental finials on the railing bear an inscription from 1601, indicating that it was called the "lecture hall" at the time. Built as part of the reconstruction project after the 1596 Keichō–Fushimi earthquake, the building reused materials from two of the previous buildings that had collapsed in the earthquake. Based on the traces remaining on the materials, the previous buildings are estimated to be one from the Kamakura period and the other from the Muromachi period, with the former being the former main hall and the latter the former lecture hall. The shrine containing the main image is closed except during special public viewing periods, but normally a replica statue is placed in front of the shrine.
- Shōrō (鐘楼), early Edo period. As with the Hondo, it was rebuilt in 1601 by Toyotomi Hideyori and Lady Yodo with Katagiri Katsumoto as the magistrate, reusing materials from a previous structure. It is a two-story bell tower with a bell hanging on the upper story, but it is an unusual style in that it does not have a veranda or railing on the upper story.
- South Gate (南門), early Edo period. As with the Hondo, it was rebuilt in 1601 by Toyotomi Hideyori and Lady Yodo with Katagiri Katsumoto as the magistrate.
- Wooden head of Bonten and Teishakuten (木造天部形), late Nara to early Heian period. While believed to be from the Nara period, and possibly the core of a dry lacquer sculpture, the refined facial features and wood-carving style also show signs of the Heian period (the designation includes a left arm including a sleeve, presumably belonging to one of the statues).
- Wooden head of Buddha (木造仏頭), Kamakura period.
- Letter in Eizon's handwriting addressed to Hokke-ji (叡尊自筆書状 四月十日 法花寺宛), Kamakura period This letter written by Eizon is a reply to a letter from the head nun, Jihi, of Hokke-ji. Instructing the nuns to dedicate themselves to the Buddhist path. He praises the nuns, young and old, for their harmonious efforts in learning and religious practice, and emphasizes the necessity of studying for the sake of spreading the Dharma and benefiting all beings. Regarding himself, Eizon states that he plans to return to Kyoto sometime after the summer, intending to achieve results in his missionary work. He asks that the nuns be instructed to continue their training diligently, even if it means a delay. This letter is dated April 10, and the exact year is unclear. However, it contains the phrase "I have sent you a letter for the second time," indicating it is a second letter. Furthermore, the signature is remarkably similar to a handwritten letter Eizon sent to Hokke-ji on March 19, 1262 (Kōchō 2), while he was staying in Kamakura (held by Saidai-ji, and designated an Important Cultural Property along with a letter dated March 21, 1249). The content also shares some common points. Additionally, the fact that it took April 3 to open the March 10 letter from Jihi suggests that this letter was likely written on April 10, 1262, in Kamakura, following the March 19th letter. Furthermore, the reverse side of the paper bears traces of a printed copy of the Rishukyo sutra, and the text is continuous with the reverse sides of two other letters held at Saidai-ji. It is believed that this letter was used as a memorial offering after Eison's death.
- Hokke-ji Temple History, 3 scrolls, 1 book (法華寺縁起類 3巻1冊); Kamakura to Nanboku-cho period

=== National Place of Scenic Beauty ===
- Hokke-ji Gardens (法華寺庭園);

=== Important Tangible Folk Cultural Property ===
- Hokke-ji Dry bath with well (法華寺のカラブロ（附 明和三年銘棟札、井戸）); Edo period (1766) In Japan, folk bathing customs were primarily for medical purposes, and the Karaburo of Hokke-ji is a rare surviving example. This karaburo is a steam-introducing facility where hot water from an iron cauldron is guided under the floor of a sealed wooden bathhouse, filling the room with steam for bathing. Based on the legend of Empress Kōmyō's act of bathing a thousand people, this facility was used for bathing during ceremonies held on January 13 and June 7, the anniversary of Empress Kōmyō's death, until the early Meiji period. Afterward, the Kōmyōkai (Empress Kōmyō's association) was organized, and the bath continued to be lit once a year, sometimes even on an ad-hoc basis at the request of local residents. Bathing involved men and women bathing separately, wearing yukata, and repeatedly entering and exiting the bathhouse with a wet towel covering their mouths.

=== Nara Prefecture Designated Tangible Cultural Properties ===
- Kōgetsutei (光月亭);
- Kyakuden (客殿上の御方);
- Genkan (玄関);

== See also ==
- List of National Treasures of Japan (paintings)
- List of National Treasures of Japan (sculptures)
- List of Historic Sites of Japan (Nara)
- List of Places of Scenic Beauty of Japan (Nara)
