= 1596 Keichō–Fushimi earthquake =

Earthquake in Japan

- Location within Japan
- Local date: September 5, 1596
- Magnitude: 7.5 ± 0.25 M_{JMA}
- Epicenter: 34.65°N 135.6°E
- Areas affected: Japan
- Max. intensity: JMA 6
- Casualties: >1,200 dead

The Keichō–Fushimi earthquake (Japanese: 慶長伏見地震, Hepburn: Keicho–Fushimi Jishin) struck Japan on September 5, 1596. The earthquake measuring 7.5 ± 0.25 M_{JMA} produced intense shaking (evaluated at Shindo 6) across the Kansai region. Devastation was recorded in Kyoto and over 1,200 people perished.

== Tectonic setting ==
The island of Honshu is situated in a region of complex plate convergence between the Pacific, Amurian, Philippine Sea and Okhotsk plates. While a large component of the convergence is accommodated by subduction along the Nankai and Japan Trenches, shallow intraplate deformation occurs as well. Due to the ongoing oblique subduction of the Philippine Sea plate, right-lateral strike-slip deformation occurs in Japan. The Japan Median Tectonic Line (MTL) and Itoigawa-Shizuoka Tectonic Line are two major fault zones that accommodate this deformation. These faults are associated with strike-slip and dip-slip faulting. The Japan MTL is among the longest and most active fault zones in Japan, and has a length of 400 km (250 mi), running parallel to the Nankai Trough. The understanding of earthquakes along the Japan MTL is limited due to its very long seismic recurrence intervals of up to 3,000 years.

== Impact ==
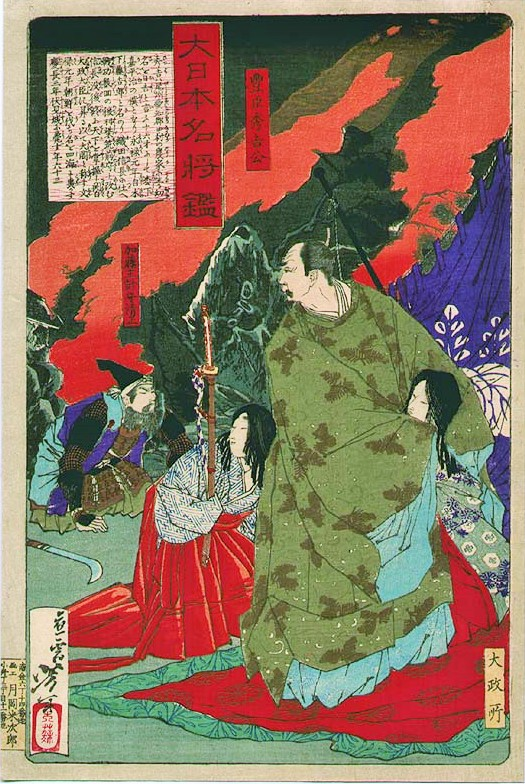
An 1879 woodblock print in Yoshitoshi's Mirror of Famous Generals of Great Japan depicting Toyotomi Hideyoshi being rescued by Katō Kiyomasa during the 1596 earthquake.

Extensive damage occurred in Keihanshin and on Awaji Island. More than 1,000 people died in Kyoto and Sakai—the Fushimi Castle in Kyoto which was under construction collapsed, killing 600 people. In Sakai, an additional 600 died. Temples including the Tō-ji, Tenryū-ji, Nison-in, Daikaku-ji, Hōkō-ji were destroyed. Newly constructed, the Fushimi Castle was destroyed. Ruins of the castle including its stone foundation and other artefacts were excavated near Momoyama Station. The earthquake was felt intensely in Takamatsu. Evidence for liquefaction was uncovered in Yawata, Kobe and Amagasaki. Landslides were triggered at Imashirozuka Kofun in Takatsuki and Nada-ku, Kobe. The Daibutsu, a Buddha statue at Hōkō-ji was heavily damaged—in an account by a priest at Daigo-ji, its chest collapsed initially followed by both hands. Cracks appeared all over the statue. The damaged statue angered Toyotomi Hideyoshi, who later shot an arrow into its face. Historians believed Hideyoshi used the Great Buddha to display power rather than for worship. The statue remained in ruins until 1597 when it was ordered to be demolished. Hideyoshi's successor, Toyotomi Hideyori, reconstructed the Daibutsu after his death.

== Geology ==
The event was the third of three destructive earthquakes occurring five days apart across the Japan MTL. The region was also previously devastated by the 1586 Tenshō earthquake. The first earthquake (Keichō–Iyo earthquake), occurred on September 1. It ruptured the Japan MTL at the western Shikoku area. It was followed by the Keichō-Bungo earthquake on either September 1 or 4 which affected Beppu Bay. The Keichō–Iyo earthquake was inferred to have occurred when the Kawakami and Iyo faults ruptured. Due to historical discrepancies, the two dates were proposed for the occurrence of the Keichō-Bungo earthquake. This earthquake was caused by faults around Beppu Bay rupturing. Tsunamis were reported. These earthquakes triggered by coulomb stress transfer within a short timespan is similar to the 1939–1999 earthquake sequence along the North Anatolian Fault.

Paleoseismological studies on the Japan MTL and Arima–Takatsuki–Rokko–Awaji Fault (ATRAF) began after the Great Hanshin earthquake of 1995. Paleoseismic earthquakes were discovered after these studies. Radiocarbon dating of these events corresponded to pre-1660 BC, 1660 BC ± 220 AD, 30 ± 220 AD to 600 AD and 16th century AD. These earthquakes produced an average right-lateral strike-slip displacement of 1.5 m (4 ft 11 in). The most recent event corresponded to the 1596 rupture. A surface rupture associated with the earthquake was traced along the Gosukebashi Fault (northern segment of the ATRAF) at the eastern side of Mount Rokkō. Surface rupturing may also have occurred along the Higashiura and Nojima faults, southern segments of the ATRAF. Geological studies however, do not support the existence of a surface rupture along the Nojima Fault. Another paleoseismic event on the Gosukebashi Fault, dated between 30 ± 220 AD to 600 AD, corresponded to the 416 AD Yamato earthquake, the earliest historical earthquake in Japan.

Further studies also suggest seismically active faults on Awaji Island, including the Naruto Fault, also ruptured during the same period. Segments of the Japan MTL on Shikoku may have also ruptured. Studies suggested that the fault segment last ruptured in the 16th century. Trenching uncovered that slip of up to 6.9 ± 0.7 m (22.6 ± 2.3 ft) was produced from the most recent event which may be associated with the Keicho–Fushimi earthquake. The Ikeda Fault, a segment of the Japan MTL on Shikoku caused 3.5 m (11 ft) of right-lateral and 0.5 m (1 ft 8 in) of vertical offset, respectively, which might have been produced during the event.

== See also ==
- List of earthquakes in Japan
- List of historical earthquakes
- Great Hanshin earthquake
