= Imashirozuka Kofun =

Kofun period burial mound in Takatsuki, Japan

- 今城塚古墳 (Japanese)
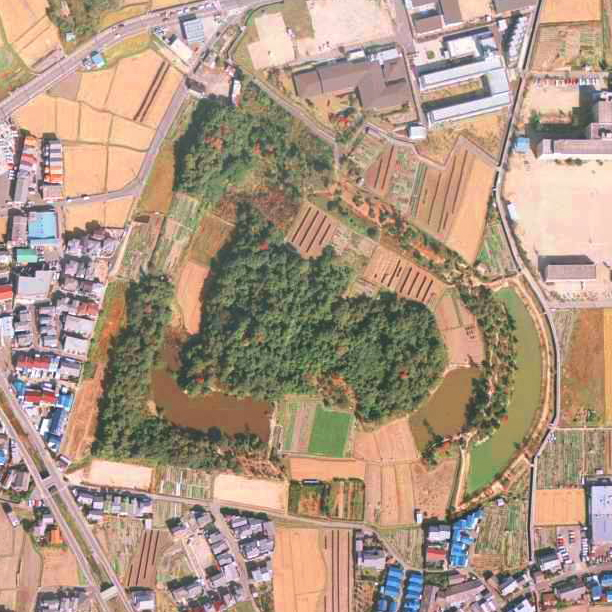
- Imashirozuka Kofun

- Imashirozuka Kofun Imashirozuka Kofun (Japan)
- Interactive map of Imashirozuka Kofun
- 34°51′0.92″N 135°35′38.99″E
- Type: Kofun
- Periods: Kofun period
- Location: Takatsuki, Osaka, Japan
- Region: Kinai region

History
- Built: 6th century

Site notes
- Excavation dates: 1997-2007
- Public access: Yes (on site museum)

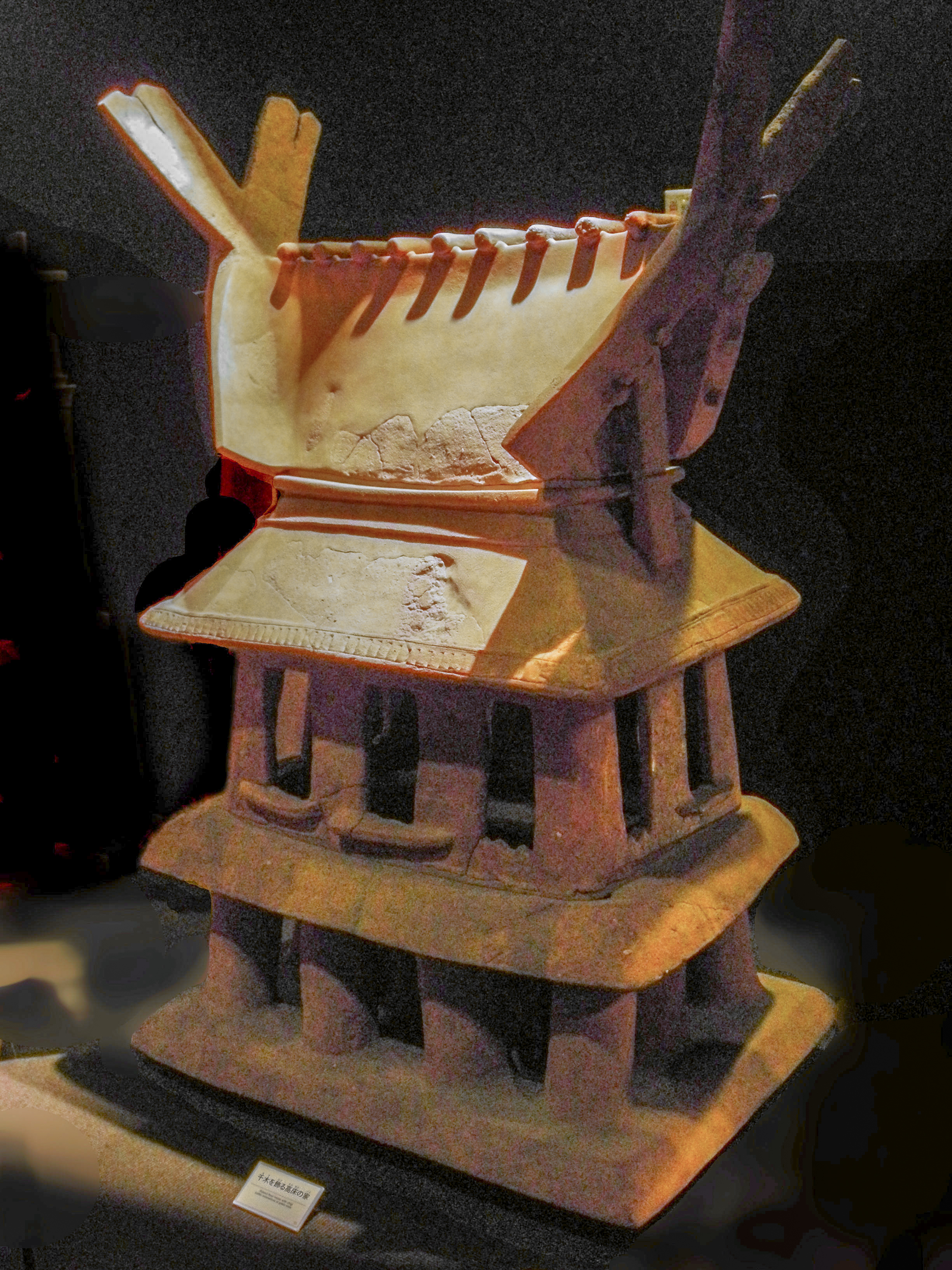
Haniwa found at Imashirozuka Kofun

Imashirozuka Kofun (今城塚古墳) is a Kofun period keyhole-shaped burial mound, located in the Gungeshinmachi neighborhood of the city of Takatsuki, Osaka in the Kinai region of Japan. The tumulus was designated a National Historic Site of Japan in 1958, with the area under protection expanded in 2006. It is the largest kofun in the Yodo River basin and one of the largest constructed in the first half of the sixth century. Although it has not been sanctioned by the Imperial Household Agency, there is a credible theory that it is the true tomb of the 26th Emperor Keitai.

== Overview ==
Imashirozuka Kofun is located near the center of the Mishima Plain, orientated to the west. It is part of the Mishimano Kofun Group. The tumulus is 190 meters long and is surrounded by a double moat. The central tumulus is accompanied by several baicho auxiliary tumuli, occupying a ba¥ell-shaped area of approximately 240 by 350 meters. Historical characteristics such as the mound's shape and haniwa found on site, as well as evidence found in the Kojiki, Nihon Shoki, Engishiki, and other historical documents suggest that it is the tomb of a "great king" of the sixth-century Yamato regime. This time corresponds to that of the semi-legendary Emperor Keitai. A committee of historians and archaeologists recommended that it be designated as Emperor Keitai's burial place; the Imperial Household Agency, however, demurred as it had already designated the Ōta Chausuyama Kofun in Ibaraki, Osaka, some 1.3 kilometers to the west, as that emperor's mausoleum. The decision conflicts with the historical and archaeological view holding that the Ōta Chausuyama Kofun, having been built in the mid fifth century, predates Emperor Keitai's reign. The appearance of a royal-scale tomb in the Yodo River system in northern Kinai in the 6th century is thought to signify a shift in royal power from the forces previously residing in Yamato and Kawachi in the southern Yamato River system., which also corresponds to Emperor Keitai's reign.

The Imashirozuka Kofun was widely thought to have been ravaged in the Sengoku period when Oda Nobunaga built a fortress on the site for attacking the Miyoshi clan in his 1568 invasion of Settsu Province; archeological evidence indicates that the damage was caused by a landslide-like collapse of the mound triggered by the 1596 Keichō–Fushimi earthquake.

The city of Takatsuki City has been conducting archaeological excavations since 1997 to obtain information for developing the site into an archaeological park. Since the burial mound is not designated as an imperial tomb or reference site by the Imperial Household Agency, it is open to the public, and the mound serves as a walking path for local residents. Fishing is currently prohibited in the moat, but it was used as a fishing spot before the park was established. A large quantity of haniwa have been recovered, including 170-cm tall house-shaped one—the largest discovered in Japan, elaborate warrior haniwa, and haniwa depicting falconers, wrestlers, shrine maidens, seated boys, horses, chickens, and other animals. These haniwa were mostly from the inner levy dividing the two moats. Some of the artifacts are on display at the nearby Imashirozuka Ancient History Museum.

The Shinikei Haniwa Production Site is located about 1.5 kilometers west of Imashirozuka Kofun. It is one of the oldest and largest haniwa workshops known and was in operation for about a century from the mid-fifth to the mid-sixth century. Excavations have confirmed three large haniwa workshops, 18 kilns, and a village for craftspeople. The site was added to the National Historic Site designation in 2006. It is a 25-minute walk from Settsu-Tonda Station on the JR West Kyōto Line or Tomita Station on the Hankyu Kyoto Main Line.

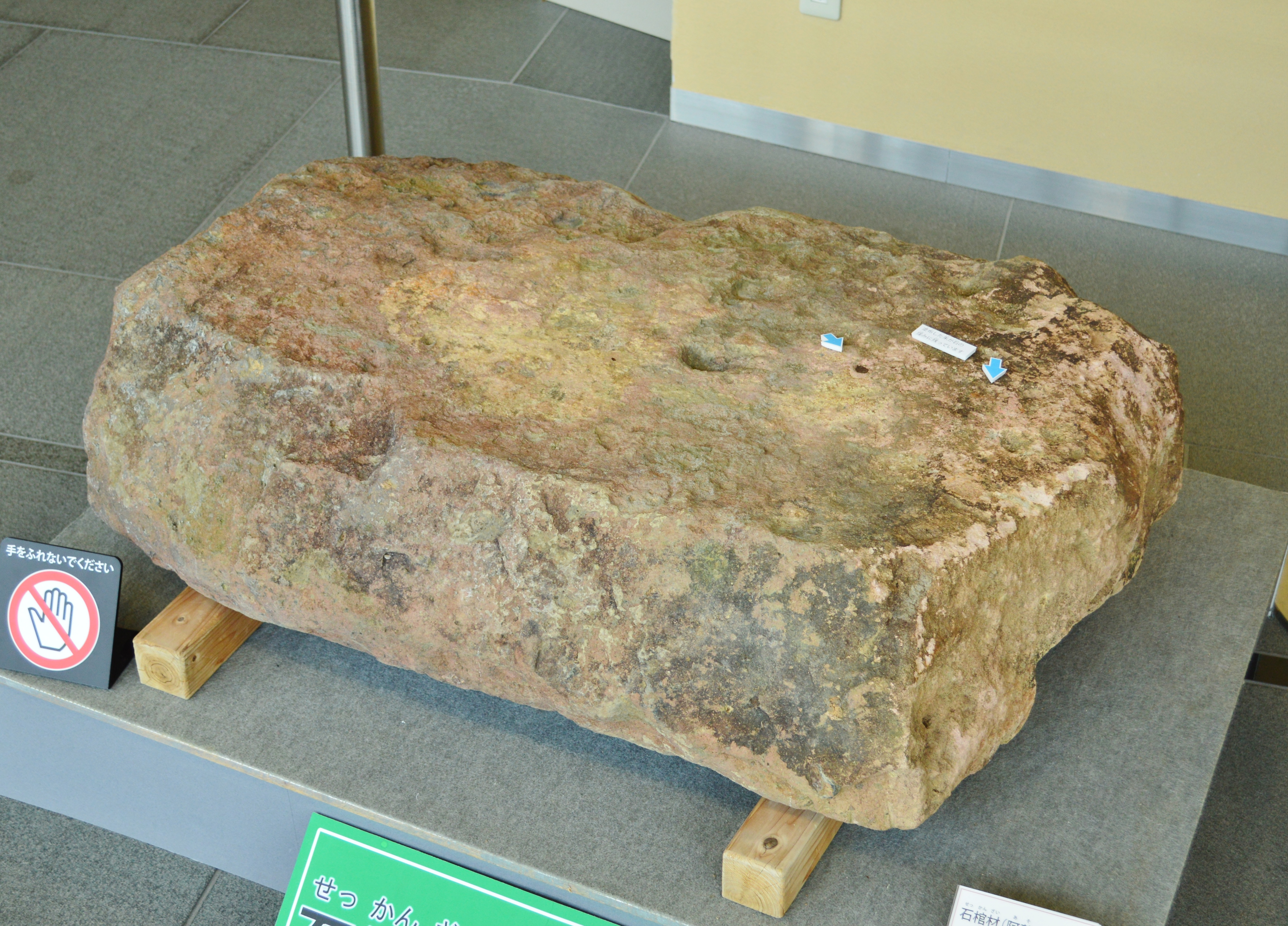
Fragment of stone sarcophagus

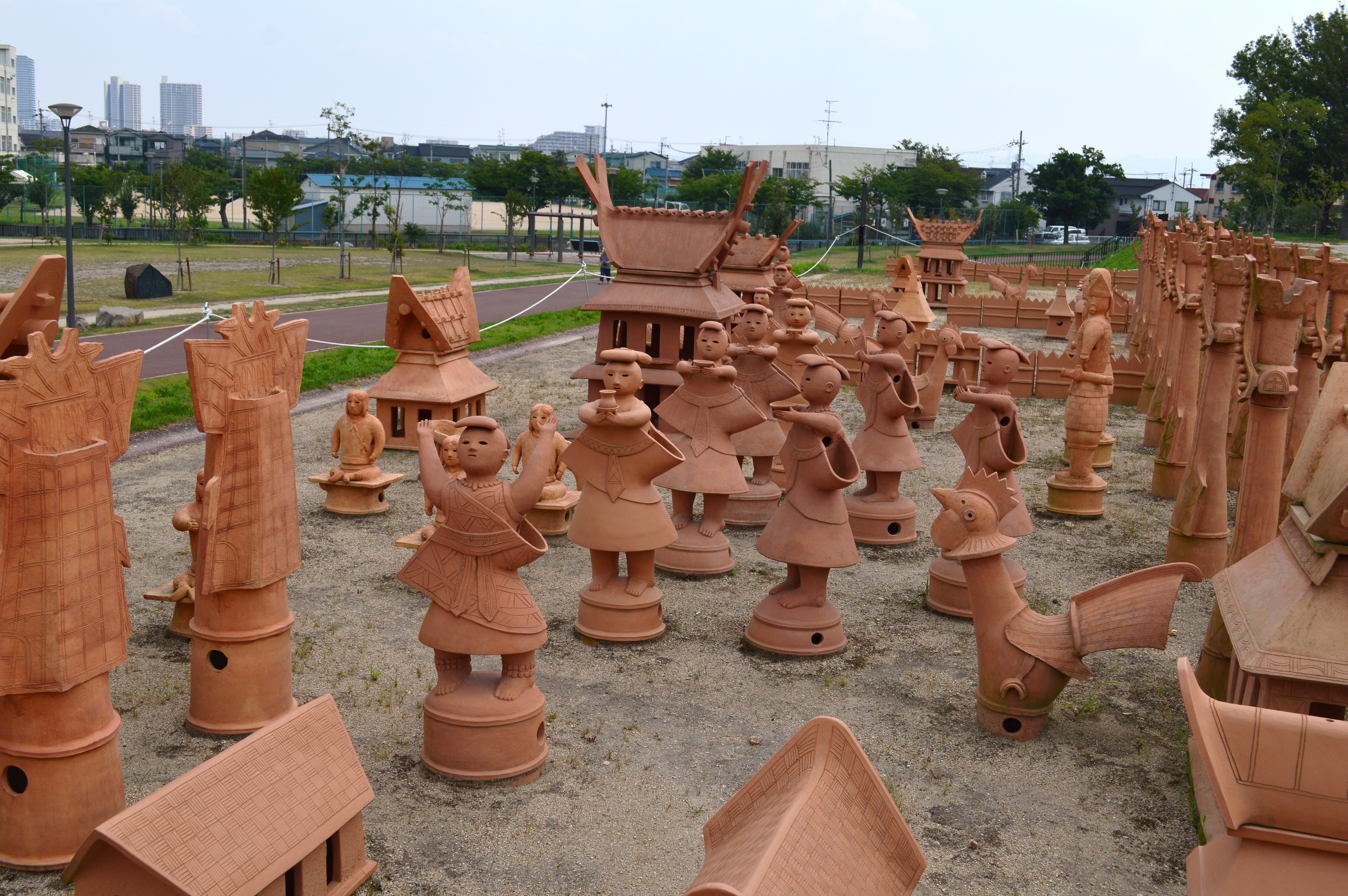
Restored haniwa

Imashirozuka Ancient History Museum

== See also ==
- List of Historic Sites of Japan (Ōsaka)
- Japanese imperial tombs
