= Kosobebosai Park =

Public park in Takatsuki, Japan

Coordinates: 34.863°N 135.621°E

- Interactive map of Kosobebosai Park
- Location: Takatsuki, Osaka; Japan
- Area: 4.56 hectares (11.3 acres)
- Parking: 84

Kosobebosai Park (古曽部防災公園, Kosobe Bōsai Kōen) is a public park located in Takatsuki, Osaka.
