= Takatsuki =

Takatsuki 高槻市
- Core city
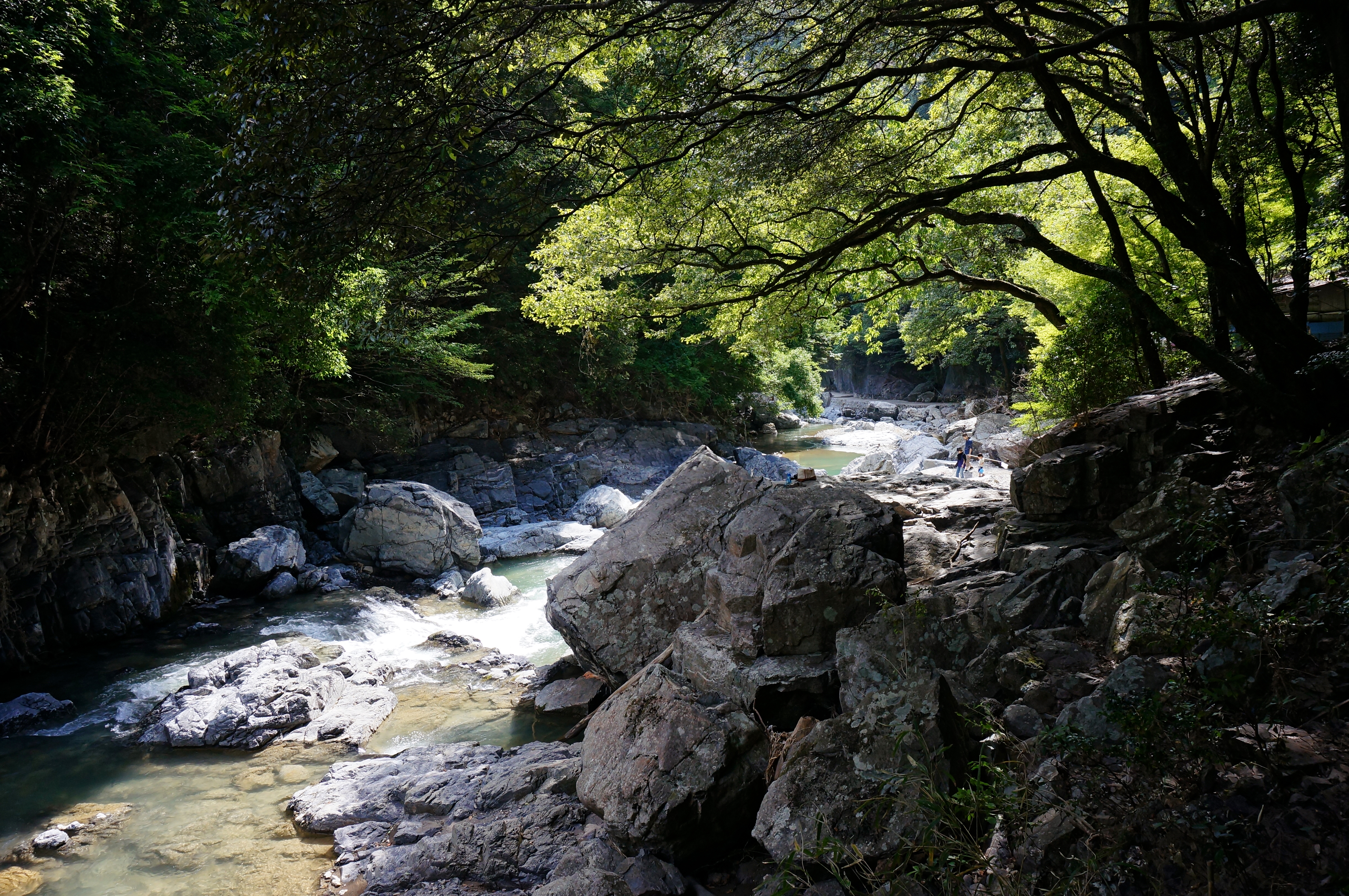

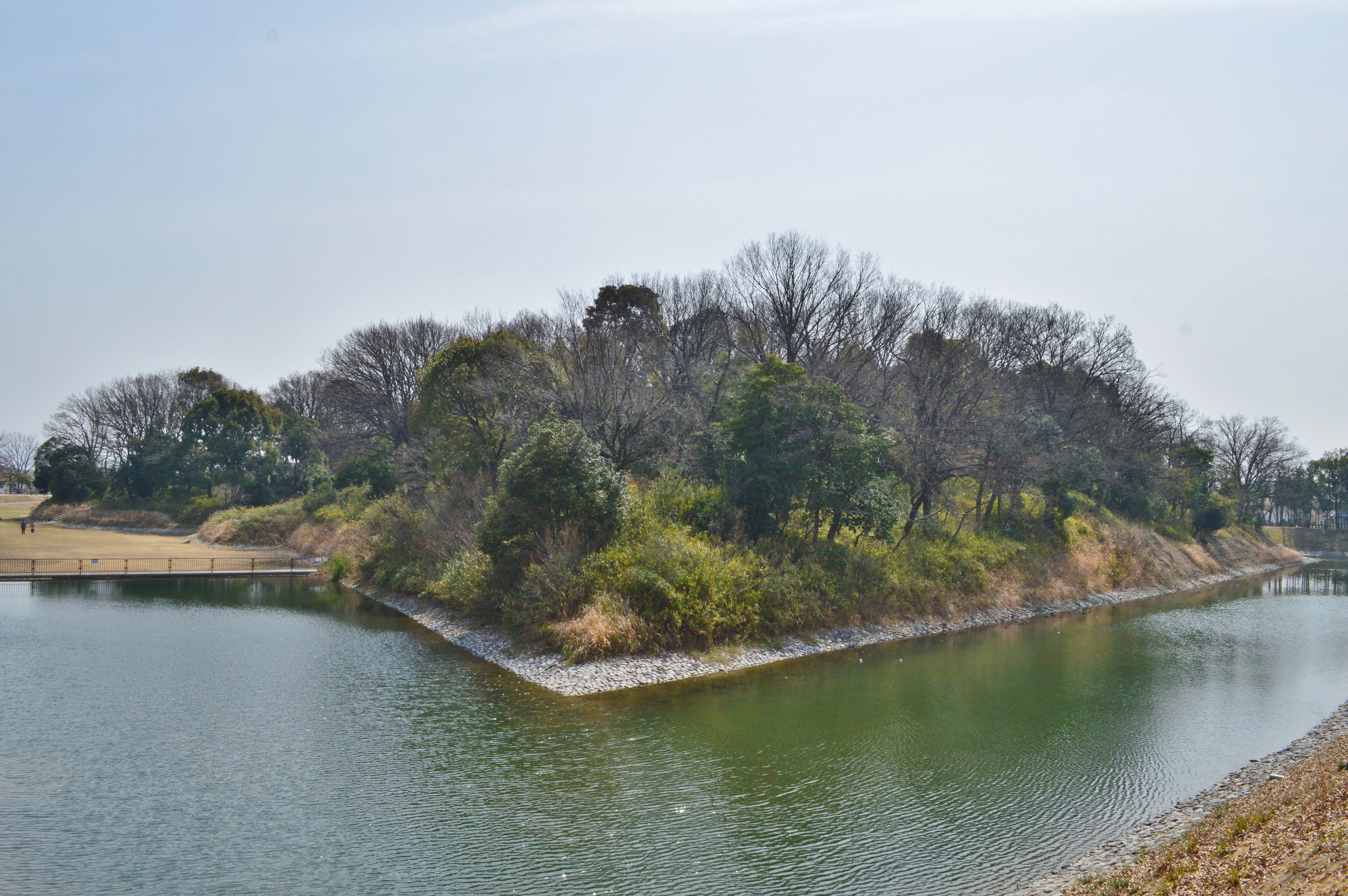

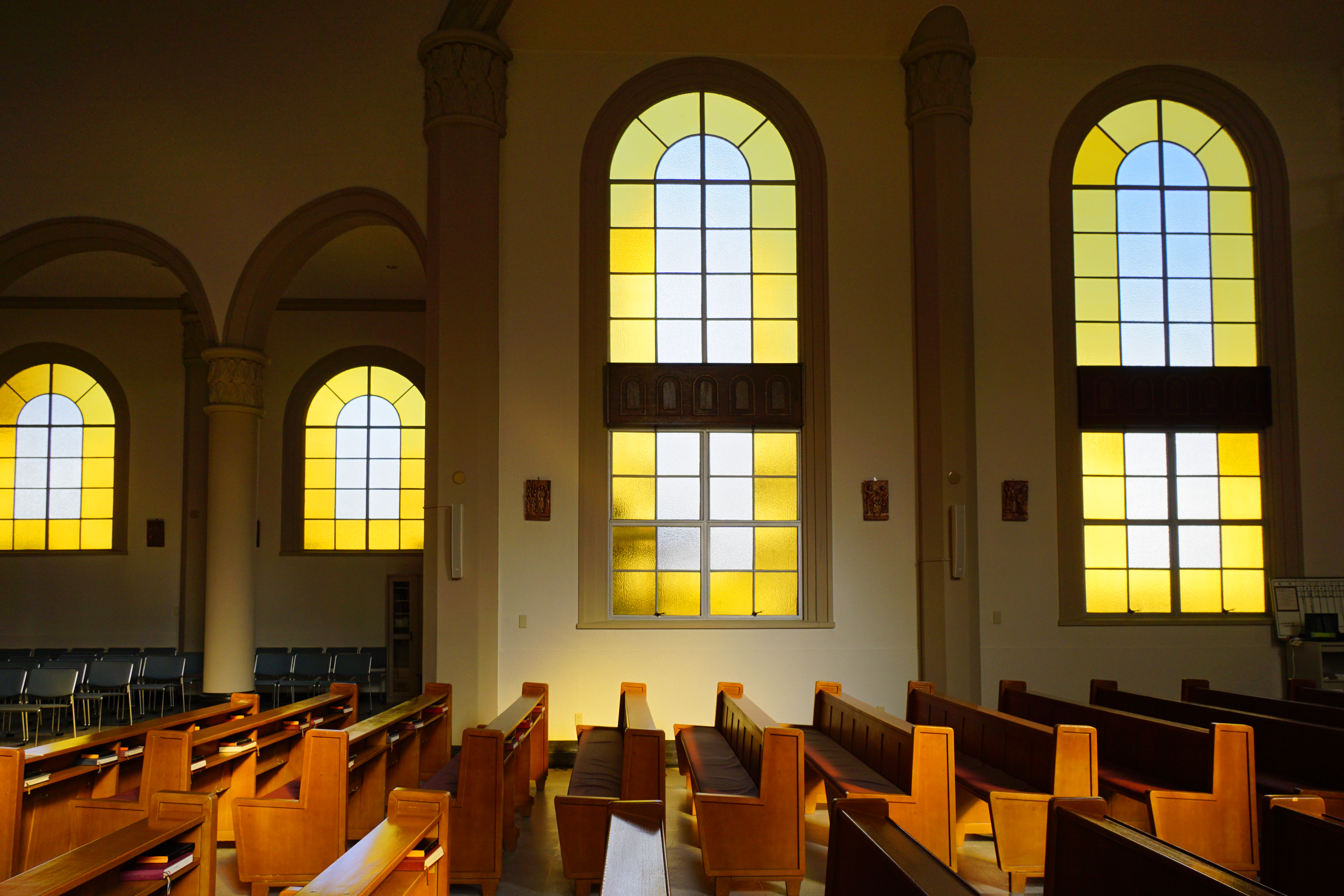

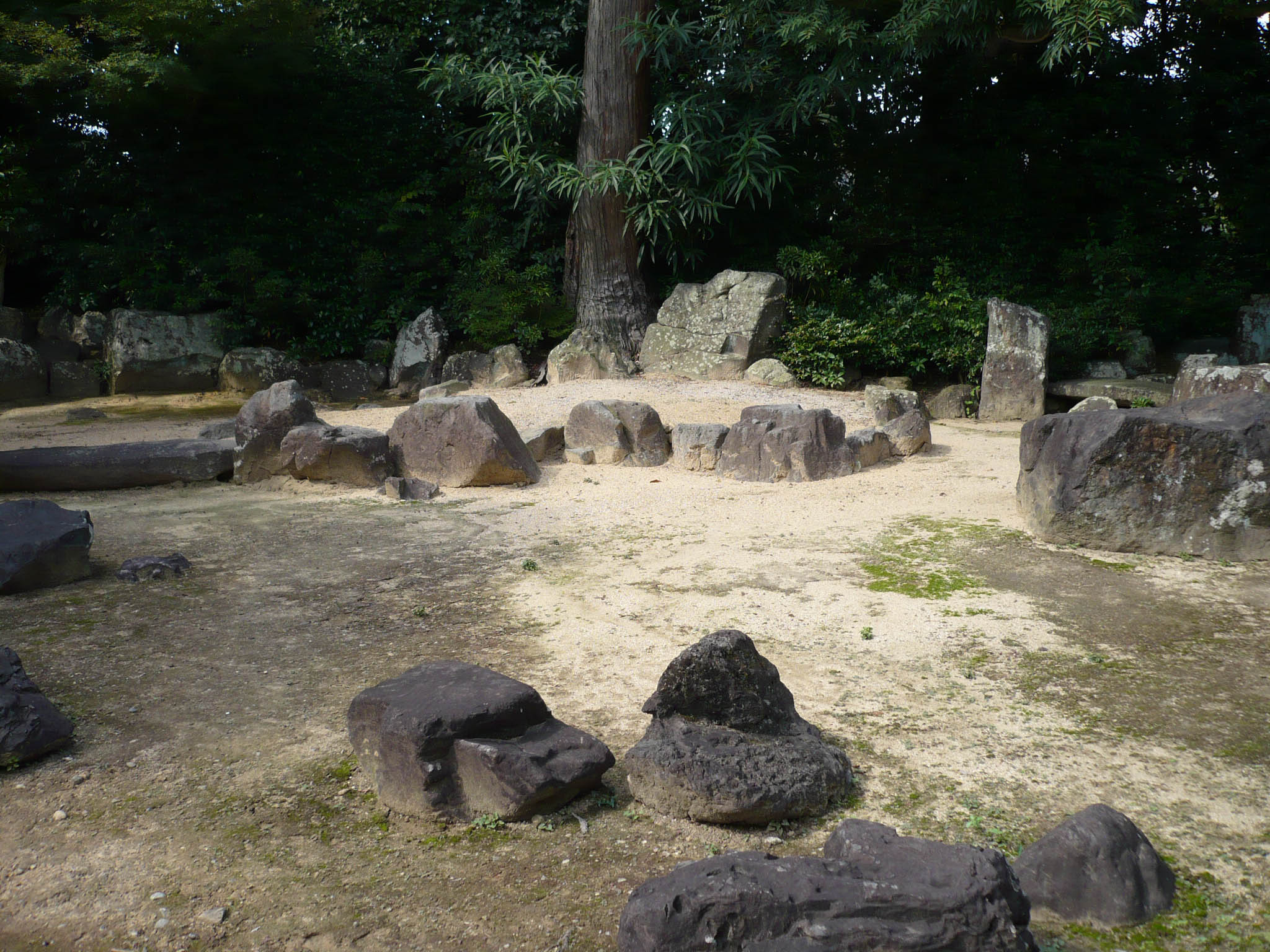

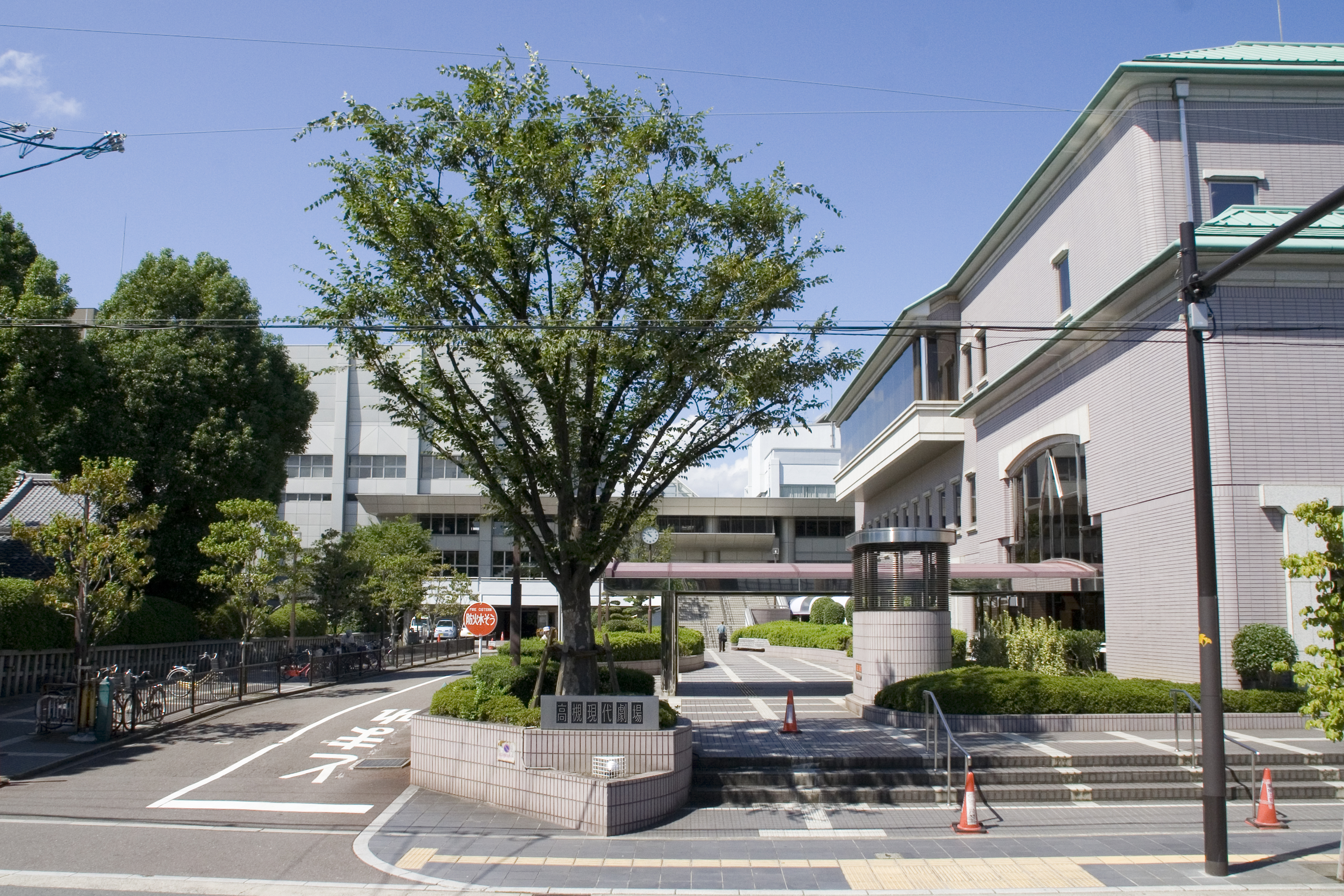
Settsu Gorge
Imashirozuka Kofun	Takatsuki Catholic Church; Takayama Ukon Memorial
Fumon-ji	Takatsuki Castle Park Arts and Culture Theater
- Flag Seal
- Location of Takatsuki in Osaka Prefecture

- Location in Japan
- Coordinates: 34°50′46″N 135°37′03″E
- Country: Japan
- Region: Kansai
- Prefecture: Osaka

Government
  - Mayor: Takeshi Hamada

Area
  - Total: 105.29 km^{2} (40.65 sq mi)

Population (March 31, 2023)
  - Total: 348,020
  - Density: 3,305.3/km^{2} (8,560.8/sq mi)
- Time zone: UTC+09:00 (JST)
- City hall address: 2-1 Tōen-chō, Takatsuki-shi, Ōsaka-fu 569-0067
- Website: Official website
- Symbols
- Flower: Deutzia
- Tree: Zelkova serrata

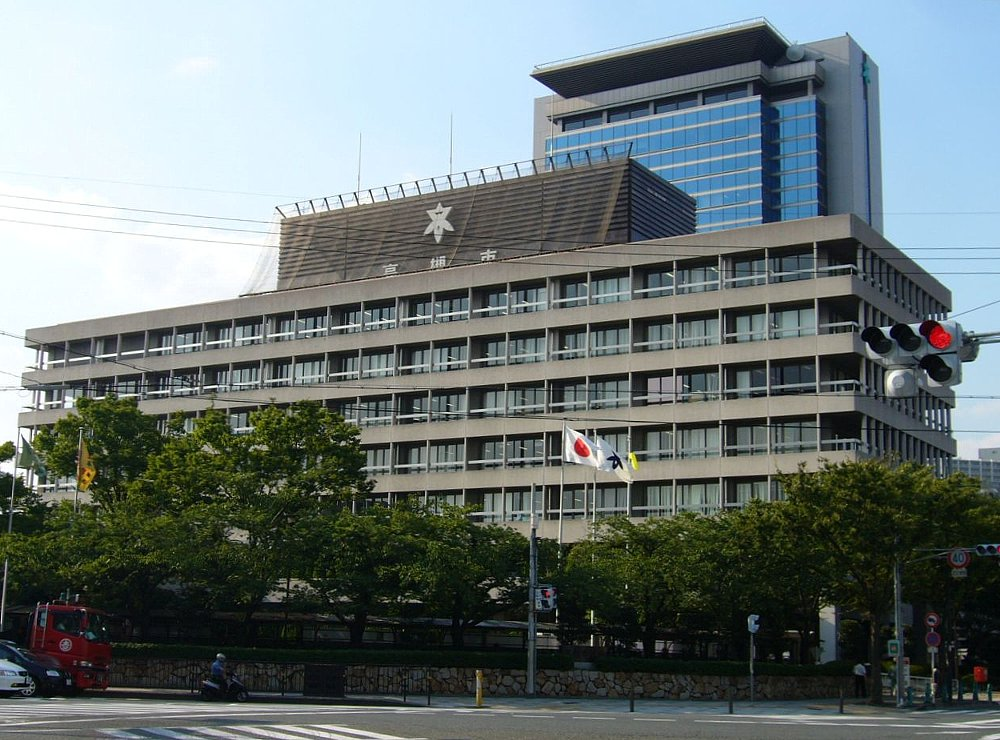
Takatsuki City Hall

Takatsuki (高槻市, Takatsuki-shi) is a city in Osaka Prefecture, Japan. As of 31 March 2023, the city had an estimated population of 348,020 in 164,494 households and a population density of 3.300 persons per km^{2}. The total area of the city is 105.29 square kilometres (40.65 sq mi).

== Geography ==
Takatsuki is located in the northeastern part of Osaka Prefecture. The city is approximately 10.4 kilometers east-to-west and 22.7 kilometers north-to-south. The north is bounded by the Hokusetsu mountain range and the south by the Yodo River, and the topography is high in the north and low in the south. The highest elevation in the city is 678.7 meters at Mt. Ponpon, and the lowest elevation is 3.3 meters at the Yodogawa riverbed in Hashiramoto. Takatsuki is 21.2 kilometers from central Osaka and 21.6 kilometers from central Kyoto. Two-thirds of the city area is zoned as urbanization control areas where development is restricted, and much of the forest and farmland remains.

== Neighboring municipalities ==
- Kyoto Prefecture
  - Kameoka
  - Nishikyō-ku, Kyoto
- Osaka Prefecture
  - Hirakata
  - Ibaraki
  - Neyagawa
  - Settsu
  - Shimamoto

=== Climate ===
Takatsuki has a humid subtropical climate (Köppen climate classification Cfa) with very warm summers and cool winters. The average annual temperature in Takatsuki is 14.2 °C. The average annual rainfall is 1690 mm with September as the wettest month. The temperatures are highest on average in July, at around 26.2 °C, and lowest in January, at around 2.8 °C.

== Demographics ==
Per Japanese census data, the population of Takatsuki is as follows.

Historical population
Year	Pop.	±%
1930	5,980	—
1940	31,011	+418.6%
1950	43,321	+39.7%
1960	79,043	+82.5%
1970	231,129	+192.4%
1980	340,720	+47.4%
1990	359,867	+5.6%
2000	357,438	−0.7%
2010	358,669	+0.3%
2020	352,876	−1.6%

== History ==
The area of Takatsuki was part of northern Settsu Province and has been continuously settled since the Japanese Paleolithic period. Remains from the Yayoi period and Kofun period are plentiful, including the Imashirozuka Kofun and the Mishima Kofun cluster. The place name 'Takatsuki' first appeared in historical materials around the 14th century, during the Kamakura period, in a list of manors belonging to Kasuga Shrine in Nara. During the Muromachi period, the area was a stronghold of the Ikkō-ikki movement, and in the Sengoku period was under the control of the warlords Miyoshi Nagayoshi and Takayama Ukon. During the Edo Period, Takatsuki Domain changed hands between several fudai daimyō clans and a jōkamachi developed around Takatsuki Castle. Takatsuki Village was established within Shimakami District, Osaka with the creation of the modern municipalities system on April 1, 1889, and elevated to town status on October 14, 1898. Takatsuki grew by annexing neighboring villages in the 1930s, and was elevated to city status on January 1, 1943. Takatsuki annexed the village of Abuno in 1448, Goryo in 1950, Sankamaki in 1955, Tomita in 1956 and the village of Kashida from Minamikuwata District, Kyoto in 1958. On April 1, 2003, Takatsuki was designated a Core city with increased local autonomy.

== Government ==
Takatsuki has a mayor-council form of government with a directly elected mayor and a unicameral city council of 34 members. Takatsuki contributes four members to the Osaka Prefectural Assembly. In terms of national politics, the city is part of the Osaka 10th district of the lower house of the Diet of Japan.

== Economy ==
Takatsuki is a regional commercial center situated almost directly between Kyoto and Osaka. Owing to the convenience of being 13 and 15 minutes by train from these two cities respectively, the city prospered and has developed with increasing rapidity to become one of the biggest commuter towns in the area, serving both Kyoto and Osaka.

== Education ==
Takatsuki has 40 public elementary schools and 18 public junior high schools and four public high schools operated by the Osaka Prefectural Board of Education. There are also three private combined middle/high schools. The prefecture also operates one special education school for the handicapped. The Osaka Medical and Pharmaceutical University and the Heian Jogakuin University are based in Takatsuki.

== Transportation ==
=== Railway ===
JR West - Kyoto Line

- Settsu-Tonda - Takatsuki

Hankyu Railway - Hankyu Kyoto Main Line

- Tonda - Takatsuki-shi - Kammaki

=== Bus ===
- Takatsuki City Bus

=== Highways ===
- National Route 170
- National Route 171

== Sister cities ==
- Masuda, Shimane, Japan, sister city agreement since 1971 (with former Hikimi town)
- Wakasa, Mikatakaminaka District, Fukui, Japan, sister city agreement since 1993 (with former Mikata town)
- Manila, Philippines, sister city agreement since 1979
- Changzhou, Jiangsu, China, sister city agreement since 1987
- Toowoomba, Queensland, Australia, sister city agreement since 1991

== Local attractions ==
Culturally, Takatsuki is renowned for its Imashirozuka Kofun (burial mound). Earthenware funerary objects (haniwa) discovered around this mound include figurines of warriors almost certainly placed with a protective purpose (The form of such a warrior was used as the design basis for the city's official mascot character, Hanitan).

Takatsuki is also known for its Takatsuki Jazz Festival, held every year in Golden Week . This is a two-day extravaganza of live jazz featuring over 300 acts, involving over 3,000 artists, who perform in 72 different locations in and around the central business district.

=== Points of interest ===
- Akutagawayama Castle ruins
- Ama ruins
- Imashirozuka Kofun
- Kosobe Conservatory (Kyoto University)
- Kosobebosai Park
- Settsu-kyo Valley Natural Park
- Takatsuki Catholic Church
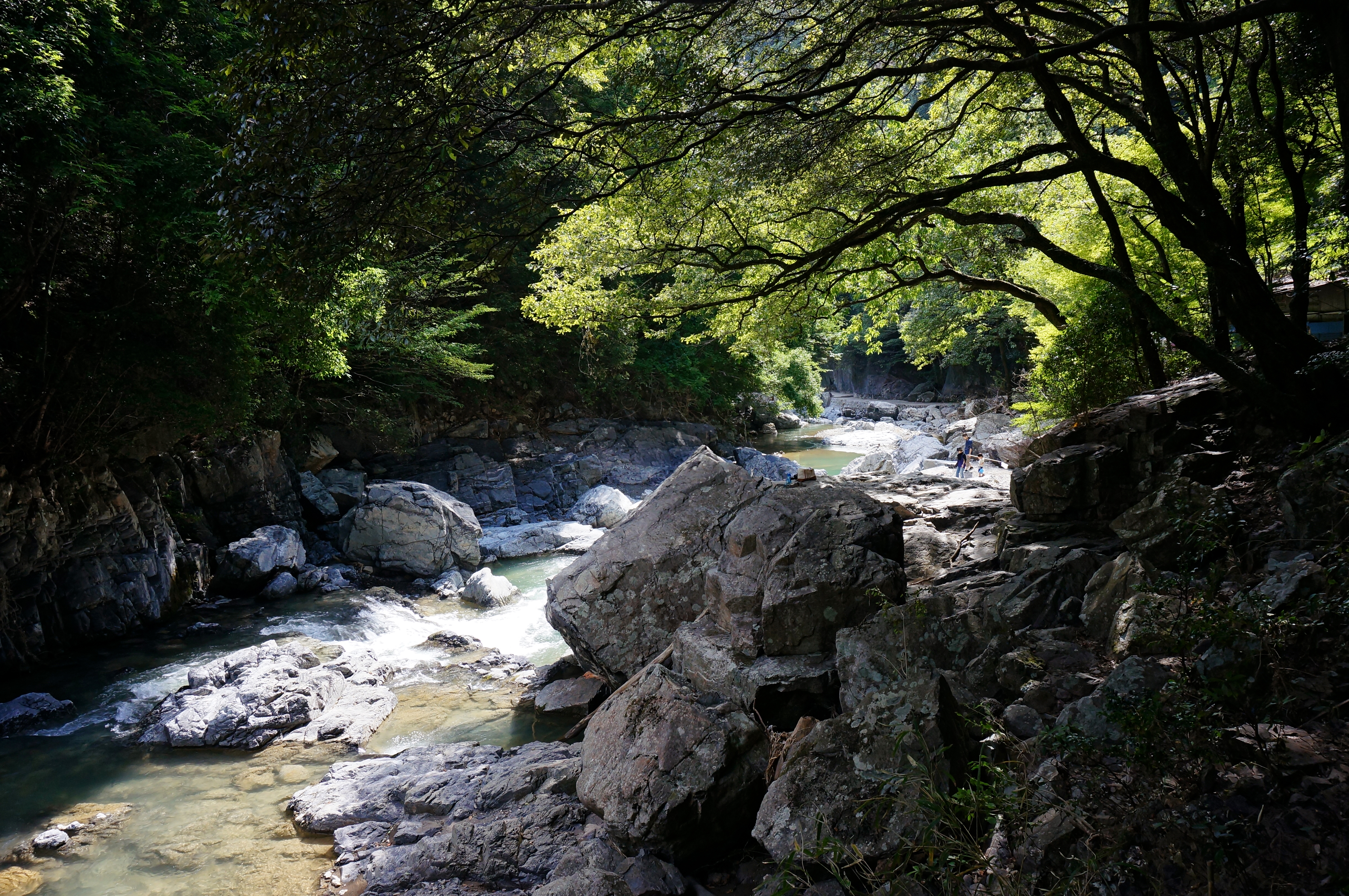
Settsu-kyo valley Natural park

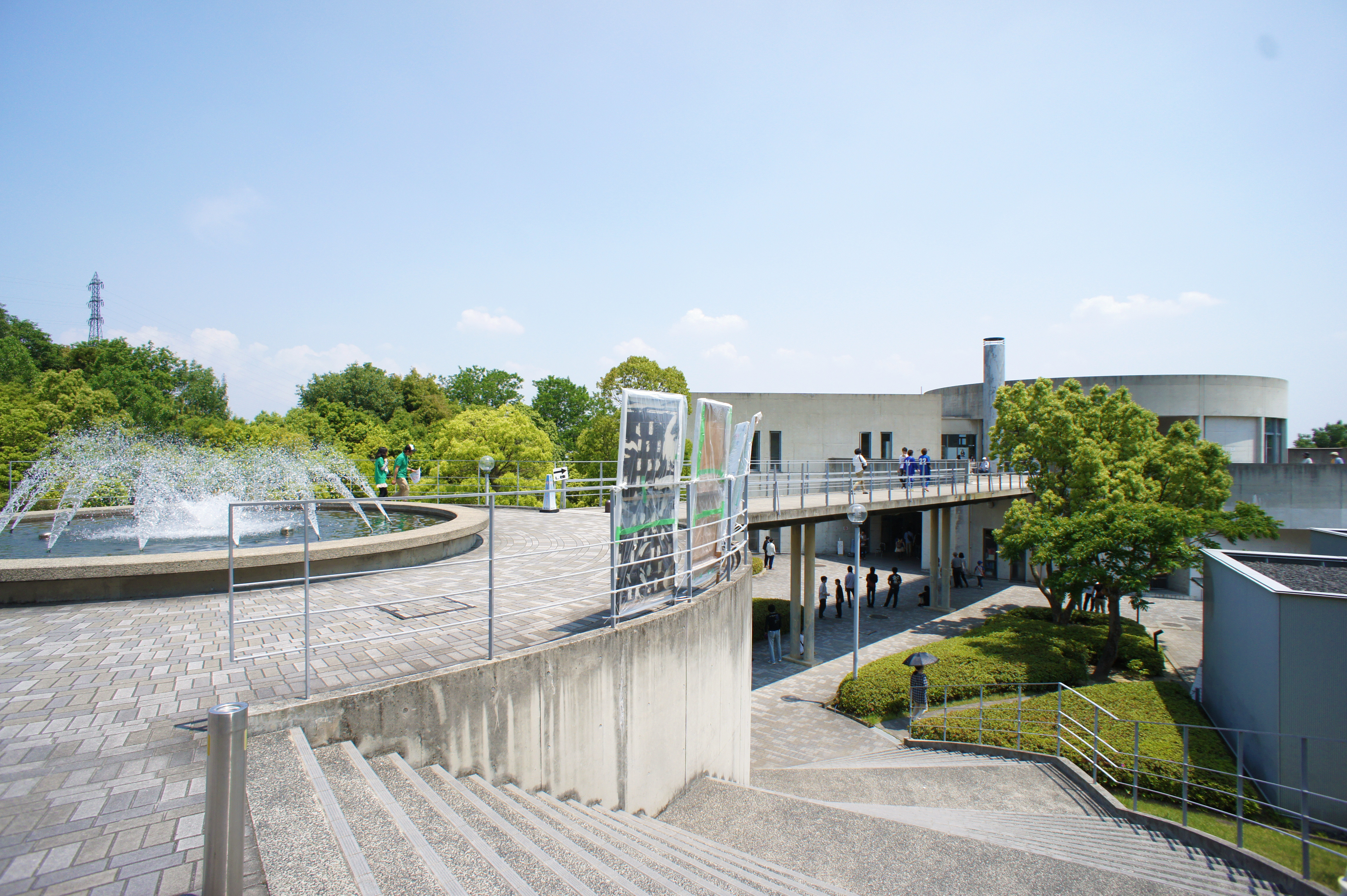
Kansai University Takatsuki Campus

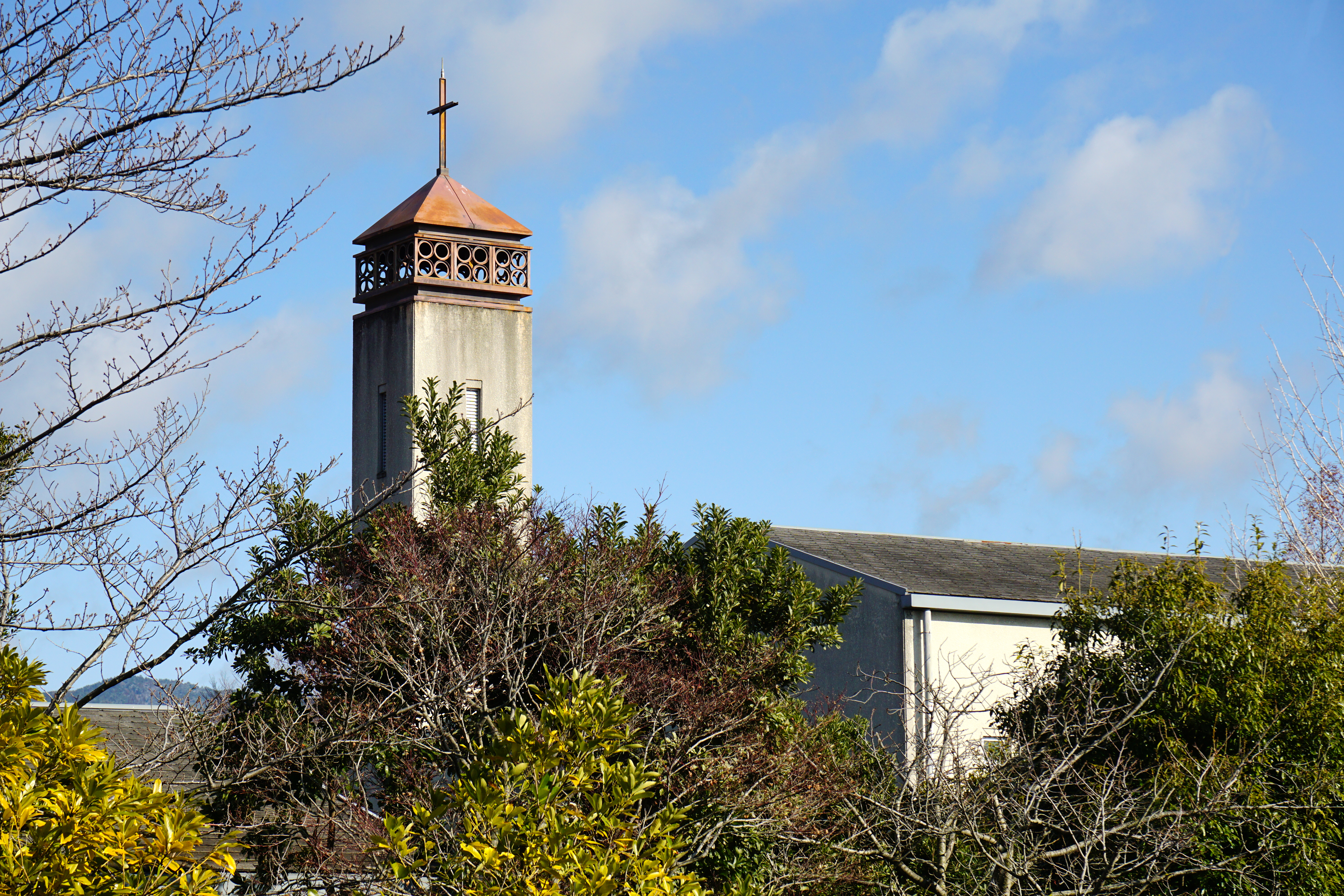
Heian Jogakuin University Takatsuki campus

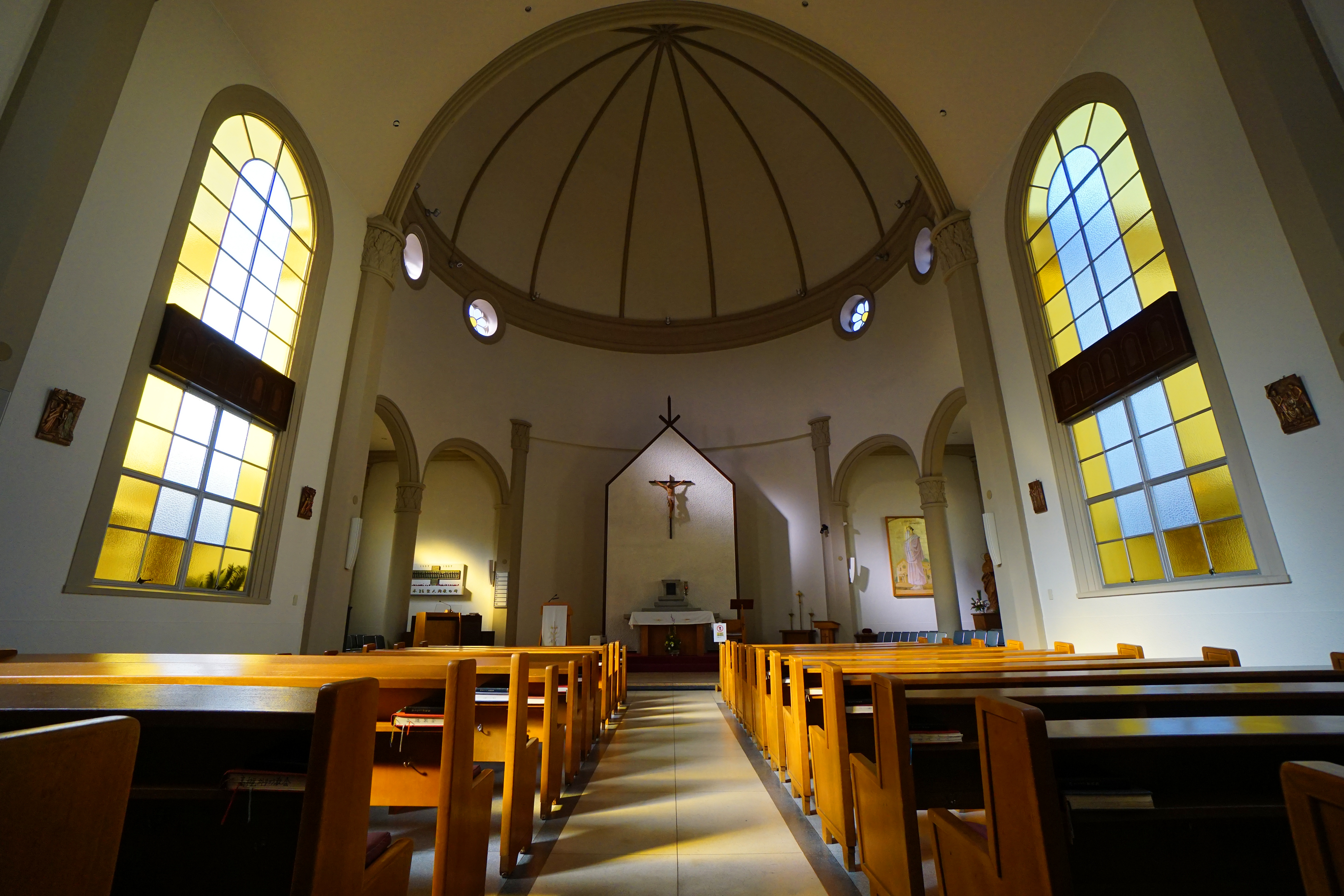
Takatsuki Catholic Church

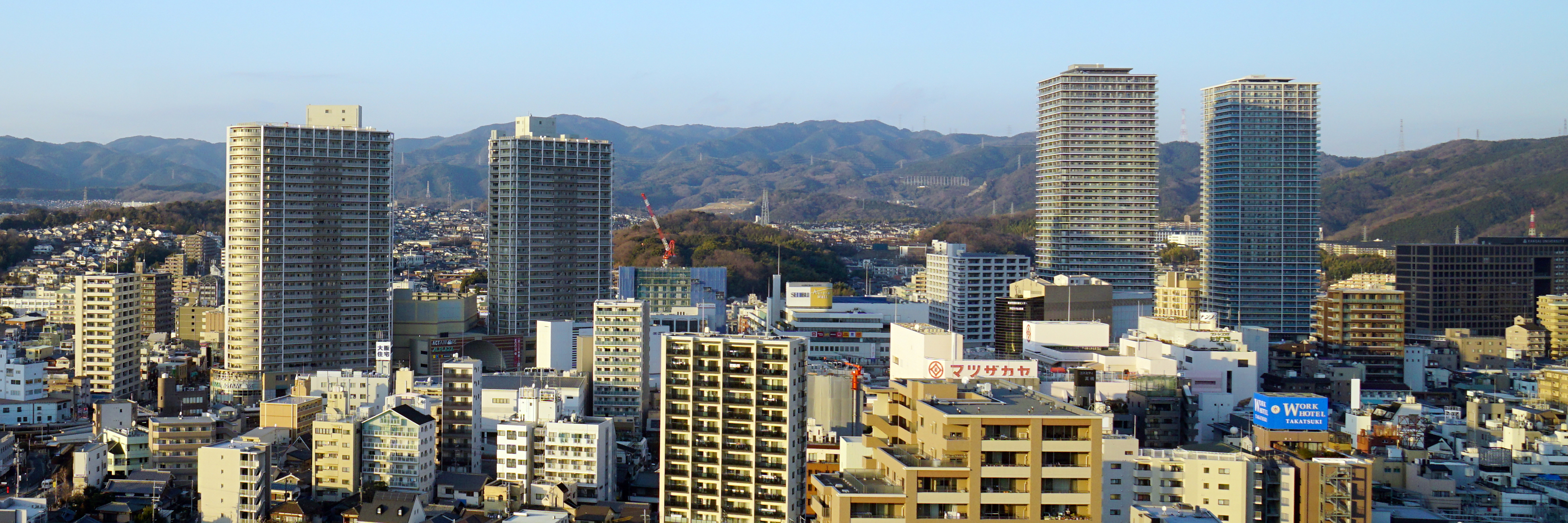
Takatsuki Downtown and Hokusetsu Mountains view

== Notable people from Takatsuki ==
- Masaaki Higashiguchi, Japanese footballer
- Toshio Irie, Japanese swimmer
- Shu Kurata, Japanese footballer
- Haru Kuroki, Japanese actress
- Noriyuki Makihara, Japanese singer
- Hidemasa Morita, Japanese footballer
- Shingo Murakami, Japanese singer, presenter, popular variety performer and actor (Kanjani Eight)
- Shinji Nakano, Japanese professional racing driver
- Nobunari Oda, Japanese competitive figure skater
- Yūko Sano, Japanese volleyball player
- Tatsunosuke Takasaki, Japanese businessman-politician
- Motoaki Tanigo, Japanese businessperson and entrepreneur. Founder, President and CEO of Cover Corporation
