= Rowing at the 1924 Summer Olympics =

Rowing at the Games of the VIII Olympiad
- Dates: 13–17 July 1924
- Competitors: 181 from 14 nations

The rowing competition at the 1924 Summer Olympics in Paris featured seven events, all for men only. The competitions were held from Sunday to Thursday, 13 to 17 July.

== Medal summary ==
Event	Gold	Silver	Bronze
Single Sculls	Jack Beresford; Great Britain	William Gilmore; United States	Josef Schneider; Switzerland
Double Sculls	Paul Costello and John B. Kelly Sr. United States	Marc Detton and Jean-Pierre Stock; France	Rudolf Bosshard and Heini Thoma; Switzerland
Coxless Pairs	Teun Beijnen and Willy Rösingh; Netherlands	Maurice Monney-Bouton and Georges Piot; France	none awarded
Coxed Pairs	Switzerland; Édouard Candeveau; Alfred Felber; Émile Lachapelle	Italy; Ercole Olgeni; Giovanni Scatturin; Gino Sopracordevole	United States; Leon Butler; Harold Wilson; Edward Jennings
Coxless Fours	Great Britain; Maxwell Eley; James MacNabb; Robert Morrison; Terence Sanders	Canada; Archibald Black; George MacKay; Colin Finlayson; William Wood	Switzerland; Émile Albrecht; Alfred Probst; Eugen Sigg; Hans Walter
Coxed four	Switzerland; Émile Albrecht; Alfred Probst; Eugen Sigg; Hans Walter; Walter Lossli	France; Eugène Constant; Louis Gressier; Georges Lecointe; Raymond Talleux; Marcel Lepan	United States; Bob Gerhardt; Sid Jelinek; Ed Mitchell; Henry Welsford; John Kennedy
Eights	United States; Leonard Carpenter; Howard Kingsbury; Alfred Lindley; John Miller; James Rockefeller; Frederick Sheffield; Benjamin Spock; Alfred Wilson; Laurence Stoddard	Canada; Arthur Bell; Robert Hunter; William Langford; Harold Little; John Smith; Warren Snyder; Norman Taylor; William Wallace; Ivor Campbell	Italy; Antonio Cattalinich; Francesco Cattalinich; Simeone Cattalinich; Giuseppe Crivelli; Latino Galasso; Pietro Ivanov; Bruno Sorich; Carlo Toniatti; Vittorio Gliubich

== Participating nations ==
A total of 181 rowers from 14 nations competed at the Paris Games:

- Argentina (9)
- Australia (10)
- Belgium (15)
- Brazil (2)
- Canada (14)
- France (22)
- Great Britain (21)
- Hungary (7)
- Italy (17)
- Netherlands (17)
- Poland (6)
- Spain (10)
- Switzerland (11)
- United States (20)

== Medal table ==
Rank	Nation	Gold	Silver	Bronze	Total
1	United States	2	1	2	5
2	Switzerland	2	0	3	5
3	Great Britain	2	0	0	2
4	Netherlands	1	0	0	1
5	France	0	3	0	3
6	Canada	0	2	0	2
7	Italy	0	1	1	2
Totals (7 entries)		7	7	6	20

== Sources ==
- "Paris 1924 Rowing - Results & Videos". www.olympic.org.
