= Italy national rowing team =

National rowing team

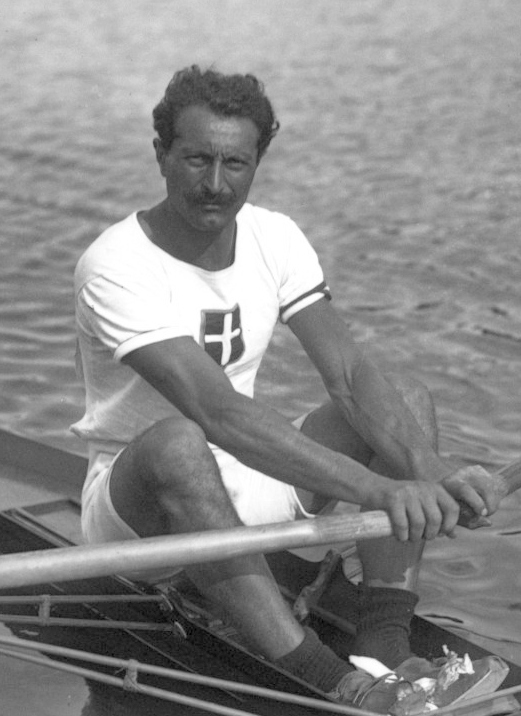
Giuseppe Sinigaglia, who won eight medals at the European Rowing Championships in the 1910s.

The Italy national rowing team represents Italy in International rowing competitions such as Olympic Games, World Rowing Championships or European Rowing Championships.

== History ==
The Italian national rowing team has participated in all of the Summer Olympics since Paris 1900.

== Olympic Games ==
Lightweight

| Olympics | Medal | Event | Rowers |
|---|---|---|---|
| 1920 Antwerp | 1st place, gold medalist(s) | Men's coxed pair | Ercole Olgeni, Giovanni Scatturin, Guido De Felip (cox) |
| 1920 Antwerp | 2nd place, silver medalist(s) | Men's double scull | Erminio Dones, Pietro Annoni |
| 1924 Paris | 2nd place, silver medalist(s) | Men's coxed pair | Ercole Olgeni, Giovanni Scatturin, Gino Sopracordevole (cox) |
| 1924 Paris | 3rd place, bronze medalist(s) | Men's eight | Ante Katalinić, Frane Katalinić, Šimun Katalinić, Giuseppe Crivelli, Latino Galasso, Petar Ivanov, Bruno Sorić, Carlo Toniatti, Vittorio Gliubich (cox) |
| 1928 Amsterdam | 1st place, gold medalist(s) | Men's coxed four | Valerio Perentin, Giliante D'Este, Nicolò Vittori, Giovanni Delise, Renato Petronio (cox) |
| 1928 Amsterdam | 3rd place, bronze medalist(s) | Men's coxless four | Cesare Rossi, Pietro Freschi, Umberto Bonadè, Paolo Gennari |
| 1932 Los Angeles | 2nd place, silver medalist(s) | Men's coxed four | Riccardo Divora, Bruno Parovel, Giovanni Plazzer, Bruno Vattovaz, Guerrino Scher (cox) |
| 1932 Los Angeles | 2nd place, silver medalist(s) | Men's eight | Mario Balleri, Renato Barbieri, Dino Barsotti, Renato Bracci, Vittorio Cioni, Guglielmo Del Bimbo, Enrico Garzelli, Roberto Vestrini, Cesare Milani (cox) |
| 1932 Los Angeles | 3rd place, bronze medalist(s) | Men's coxless four | Francesco Cossu, Giliante D'Este, Antonio Garzoni Provenzani, Antonio Ghiardello |
| 1936 Berlin | 2nd place, silver medalist(s) | Men's eight | Guglielmo Del Bimbo, Dino Barsotti, Oreste Grossi, Enzo Bartolini, Mario Checcacci, Dante Secchi, Ottorino Quaglierini, Enrico Garzelli, Cesare Milani (cox) |
| 1936 Berlin | 2nd place, silver medalist(s) | Men's coxed pair | Almiro Bergamo, Guido Santin, Luciano Negrini (cox) |
| 1948 London | 1st place, gold medalist(s) | Men's coxless four | Giuseppe Moioli, Elio Morille, Giovanni Invernizzi, Franco Faggi |
| 1948 London | 2nd place, silver medalist(s) | Men's coxed pair | Giovanni Steffè, Aldo Tarlao, Alberto Radi (cox) |
| 1948 London | 3rd place, bronze medalist(s) | Men's coxless pair | Felice Fanetti, Bruno Boni |
| 1948 London | 3rd place, bronze medalist(s) | Men's single sculls | Romolo Catasta |
| 1956 Melbourne | 1st place, gold medalist(s) | Men's coxed four | Alberto Winkler, Romano Sgheiz, Angelo Vanzin, Franco Trincavelli, Ivo Stefanoni (cox) |
| 1960 Rome | 2nd place, silver medalist(s) | Men's coxless four | Tullio Baraglia, Renato Bosatta, Giancarlo Crosta, Giuseppe Galante |
| 1960 Rome | 3rd place, bronze medalist(s) | Men's coxed four | Fulvio Balatti, Romano Sgheiz, Franco Trincavelli, Giovanni Zucchi, Ivo Stefanoni (cox) |
| 1964 Tokyo | 2nd place, silver medalist(s) | Men's coxed four | Renato Bosatta, Emilio Trivini, Giuseppe Galante, Franco De Pedrina, Giovanni Spinola (cox) |
| 1968 Mexico City | 1st place, gold medalist(s) | Men's coxed pair | Primo Baran, Renzo Sambo, Bruno Cipolla (cox) |
| 1968 Mexico City | 3rd place, bronze medalist(s) | Men's coxless four | Renato Bosatta, Pier Conti-Manzini, Tullio Baraglia, Abramo Albini |
| 1984 Los Angeles | 1st place, gold medalist(s) | Men's coxed pair | Carmine Abbagnale, Giuseppe Abbagnale, Peppiniello Di Capua |
| 1988 Seoul | 1st place, gold medalist(s) | Men's coxed pair | Carmine Abbagnale, Giuseppe Abbagnale, Peppiniello Di Capua |
| 1988 Seoul | 1st place, gold medalist(s) | Men's quadruple sculls | Agostino Abbagnale, Davide Tizzano, Gianluca Farina, Piero Poli |
| 1992 Barcelona | 2nd place, silver medalist(s) | Men's coxed pair | Carmine Abbagnale, Giuseppe Abbagnale, Peppiniello Di Capua |
| 1992 Barcelona | 3rd place, bronze medalist(s) | Men's quadruple sculls | Alessandro Corona, Gianluca Farina, Rossano Galtarossa, Filippo Soffici |
| 1996 Atlanta | 1st place, gold medalist(s) | Men's double sculls | Agostino Abbagnale, Davide Tizzano |
| 2000 Sidney | 1st place, gold medalist(s) | Men's quadruple sculls | Agostino Abbagnale, Alessio Sartori, Rossano Galtarossa, Simone Raineri |
| 2000 Sidney | 2nd place, silver medalist(s) | Men's coxless four | Valter Molea, Riccardo Dei Rossi, Lorenzo Carboncini, Carlo Mornati |
| 2000 Sidney | 2nd place, silver medalist(s) | Men's lightweight double sculls | Elia Luini, Leonardo Pettinari |
| 2000 Sidney | 3rd place, bronze medalist(s) | Men's double sculls | Giovanni Calabrese, Nicola Sartori |
| 2004 Athens | 3rd place, bronze medalist(s) | Men's double sculls | Rossano Galtarossa, Alessio Sartori |
| 2004 Athens | 3rd place, bronze medalist(s) | Men's coxless four | Lorenzo Porzio, Dario Dentale, Luca Agamennoni, Raffaello Leonardo |
| 2004 Athens | 3rd place, bronze medalist(s) | Men's lightweight coxless four | Lorenzo Bertini, Catello Amarante, Salvatore Amitrano, Bruno Mascarenhas |
| 2008 Beijing | 2nd place, silver medalist(s) | Men's quadruple sculls | Luca Agamennoni, Simone Venier, Rossano Galtarossa, Simone Raineri |
| 2012 London | 2nd place, silver medalist(s) | Men's double sculls | Alessio Sartori, Romano Battisti |
| 2016 Rio de Janeiro | 3rd place, bronze medalist(s) | Men's coxless four | Marco Di Costanzo, Giovanni Abagnale |
| 2016 Rio de Janeiro | 3rd place, bronze medalist(s) | Men's coxless four | Domenico Montrone, Matteo Castaldo, Matteo Lodo, Giuseppe Vicino |

== World Rowing Championships ==
The first women's medal at the world championships was won by Elisabetta Sancassani and Gabriella Bascelli at the 2002 World Rowing Championships.

== European Rowing Championships ==
Italy ranks 2nd in the all-time medal table of the European championships behind East Germany.

== All medals ==
| Event | Editions | 1st edition | Men | | | | | | | | Women | | | | Total | | | | Ranking | Refer |
|---|---|---|---|---|---|---|---|---|---|---|---|---|---|---|---|---|---|---|---|---|
| Event | Editions | 1st edition | Senior | | | | Lightweight | | | | Women | | | | Total | | | | Ranking | Refer |
| Event | Editions | 1st edition | Gold medal | Silver medal | Bronze medal | Tot. | Gold medal | Silver medal | Bronze medal | Tot. | Gold medal | Silver medal | Bronze medal | Tot. | Gold medal | Silver medal | Bronze medal | Tot. | Ranking | Refer |
| Olympic Games | 26 | 1896 | 10 | 13 | 13 | 36 | 0 | 1 | 1 | 2 | 0 | 0 | 0 | 0 | 10 | 14 | 14 | 28 | 9th | |
| World Championships | 49 | 1962 | 22 | 26 | 23 | 71 | 59 | 38 | 23 | 120 | 4 | 3 | 5 | 12 | 85 | 67 | 51 | 203 | 2nd | |
| European Championships | 76 | 1893 | 64 | 89 | 53 | 206 | 10 | 6 | 4 | 20 | 1 | 4 | 8 | 13 | 75 | 99 | 65 | 239 | | |

== Multiple medalists ==
=== Olympic Games ===
| # | Rower | | | |
| # | Rower | Gold medal | Silver medal | Bronze medal |
|---|---|---|---|---|
| 1 | Agostino Abbagnale | 3 | 0 | 0 |
| 2 | Giuseppe Abbagnale | 2 | 1 | 0 |
| 2 | Carmine Abbagnale | 2 | 1 | 0 |
| 2 | Peppiniello Di Capua | 2 | 1 | 0 |

=== World Championships ===
| # | Rower | | | |
| # | Rower | Gold medal | Silver medal | Bronze medal |
|---|---|---|---|---|
| 1 | Daniele Gilardoni | 11 | 1 | 1 |
| 2 | Franco Sancassani | 9 | 2 | 1 |
| 3 | Francesco Esposito | 9 | 1 | 1 |
| 4 | Peppiniello Di Capua | 8 | 2 | 1 |
| 5 | Andrea Re | 8 | 1 | 2 |
| 6 | Carmine Abbagnale | 7 | 3 | 1 |
| 7 | Giuseppe Abbagnale | 7 | 2 | 1 |

== See also ==
- Italian Rowing Federation (Italian: Federazione Italiana Canottaggio, FIC)
- Italy at the Olympics
- Rowing Olympics All-time medal table
- World Championships All-time medal table
- European Championships medal table (2007-2019)
