= Canada at the 1924 Summer Olympics =

- IOC code: CAN
- NOC: Canadian Olympic Committee

in Paris
- Competitors: 65 in 8 sports
- Flag bearer: Hector Phillips
- Medals Ranked 20th: Gold 0 Silver 3 Bronze 1 Total 4

Summer Olympics appearances (overview)
- 1900; 1904; 1908; 1912; 1920; 1924; 1928; 1932; 1936; 1948; 1952; 1956; 1960; 1964; 1968; 1972; 1976; 1980; 1984; 1988; 1992; 1996; 2000; 2004; 2008; 2012; 2016; 2020; 2024; 2028

Other related appearances
- 1906 Intercalated Games

Canada competed at the 1924 Summer Olympics in Paris, France. 65 competitors, all men, took part in 39 events in 8 sports.

In January 1924, Canadian Olympic Committee secretary-treasurer Fred Marples announced that sending the Canadian team to the Summer Olympics would cost C$40,000. He stated that unless the Canadian Olympic Committee could raise $20,000 to $25,000 within a couple months, the national team would be small and not representative of Canadian athletics. He felt that it was the duty of all Canadian citizens to help, and urged contributions from individuals, organizations, and provincial governments.

J. Howard Crocker was appointed chairman of the track and field sub-committee to select athletes, and named committee members to represent each province. He visited track and field championships across Canada to scout Canada's next Olympic athletes. When Crocker declined to be Chef de Mission for Canada at the Olympics, Patrick J. Mulqueen replaced him as manager of the Canadian delegation.

After the games, Marples reported that it cost $460 to send each athlete to France, but the Canadian Olympic Committee still had financial reserves despite being approximately $1100 over budget. The Amateur Athletic Union of Canada praised Marples and Canadian Olympic Committee executives for their efforts and assembling the largest Canadian Olympic team to date.

== Medallists ==
Medal	Name	Sport	Event	Date
Silver	Archibald Black, Colin Finlayson, George MacKay, William Wood	Rowing	Men's coxless four	July 17
Silver	Arthur Bell, Ivor Campbell, Robert Hunter, William Langford, Harold Little, John Smith, Warren Snyder, Norman Taylor, William Wallace	Rowing	Men's eight	July 17
Silver	William Barnes, George Beattie, John Black, Robert Montgomery, Samuel Newton, Samuel Vance	Shooting	Men's team clay pigeons	July 7
Bronze	Douglas Lewis	Boxing	Men's welterweight	July 20

== Aquatics ==
=== Swimming ===
Ranks given are within the heat.

Swimmer	Event	Heats		Semifinals		Final	
Swimmer	Event	Result	Rank	Result	Rank	Result	Rank
Clayton Bourne	100 m freestyle	1:06.2	1 Q	1:06.0	5	did not advance	
George Vernot	400 m freestyle	5:32.2	3 q	5:38.0	4	did not advance	
George Vernot	1500 m freestyle	23:11.4	2 Q	23:02.4	5	did not advance	

== Athletics ==
Twenty-seven athletes represented Canada in 1924. It was the nation's sixth appearance in the sport.

Ranks given are within the heat.

Athlete	Event	Heats		Quarterfinals		Semifinals		Final	
Athlete	Event	Result	Rank	Result	Rank	Result	Rank	Result	Rank
Laurie Armstrong	100 m	unknown	3	did not advance					
Laurie Armstrong	200 m	unknown	2 Q	unknown	5	did not advance			
Horace Aylwin	400 m	54.0	1 Q	unknown	6	did not advance			
Rolph Barnes	1500 m	N/A				4:13.1	3	did not advance	
Alan Christie	400 m	50.5	2 Q	50.8	3	did not advance			
Cyril Coaffee	100 m	11.0	1 Q	10.8	1 Q	10.8	5	did not advance	
Cyril Coaffee	200 m	unknown	2 Q	unknown	2 Q	22.4	6	did not advance	
John Cuthbert	Marathon	N/A						3:00:44.6	13
Irvine Francis	Pole vault	N/A				3.55	5	did not advance	
Edward Freeman	10 km walk	N/A				Disqualified		did not advance	
William Fuller	400 m	51.5	3	did not advance					
Philip Grandville	10 km walk	N/A				Disqualified		did not advance	
Jack Harris	800 m	N/A		2:01.6	3 Q	unknown	6	did not advance	
Gordon Hester	100 m	11.2	1 Q	10.7	2 Q	11.5	6	did not advance	
Gordon Hester	200 m	unknown	2 Q	unknown	4	did not advance			
David Johnson	400 m	51.8	1 Q	49.3	2 Q	48.0	3 Q	48.8	4
Victor MacAuley	Marathon	N/A						3:02:05.4	14
Philip MacDonald	Triple jump	N/A				13.33	7	did not advance	
David McGill	5000 m	N/A				unknown	7	did not advance	
John MacKechenneay	200 m	23.2	1 Q	unknown	5	did not advance			
Tom McKay	800 m	N/A		2:00.1	3 Q	1:58.5	8	did not advance	
Jack Miller	High jump	N/A				1.65	8	did not advance	
Warren Montabone	110 m hurdles	N/A		unknown	4	did not advance			
Warren Montabone	400 m hurdles	N/A		unknown	4	did not advance			
John Murdoch	Hammer throw	N/A				42.48	8	did not advance	
Hec Phillips	800 m	N/A		unknown	5	did not advance			
Victor Pickard	Pole vault	N/A				3.66	1 Q	3.80	5
Victor Pickard	Javelin throw	N/A				44.69	14	did not advance	
Sydney Pierce	110 m hurdles	N/A		16.2	3	did not advance			
Russ Sheppard	Triple jump	N/A				12.72	8	did not advance	
Anthony Vince	100 m	11.4	2 Q	unknown	6	did not advance			
Larry Armstrong; Cyril Coaffee; George Hester; Anthony Vince	4 × 100 m relay	N/A		43.0	2 Q	unknown	3	did not advance	
Horace Aylwin; Alan Christie; David Johnson; William Maynes	4 × 400 m relay	N/A				3:34.5	2 Q	3:22.8	4

== Boxing ==
Nine boxers represented Canada at the 1924 Games. It was the nation's second appearance in the sport. Facing tougher competition, Canada's team was unable to achieve results comparable to the five medals earned in 1920. Lewis was the only Canadian boxer in 1924 to win a medal, taking the bronze in the welterweight.

Boxer	Weight class	Round of 32	Round of 16	Quarterfinals	Semifinals	Final / bronze match	
Boxer	Weight class	Opposition Score	Opposition Score	Opposition Score	Opposition Score	Opposition Score	Rank
Charley Belanger	Light heavyweight	bye	Mulholland (USA); L	did not advance			9
Leslie Black	Middleweight	Feidt (LUX); W	Lefkowitch (USA); W	Murphy (IRL); W	Elliott (GBR); L	Beecken (BEL); L	4
Agnew Burlie	Featherweight	Salas (USA); L	did not advance				17
Chris Graham	Lightweight	Corney (URU); W	Rothwell (USA); L	did not advance			9
Harry Henning	Middleweight	Leopardi (ITA); W	Jensen (NOR); W	Elliott (GBR); L	did not advance		5
Douglas Lewis	Welterweight	Hultgren (SWE); W	Oldani (ITA); W	Haggerty (USA); W	Delarge (BEL); L	Dwyer (IRL); W	3rd place, bronze medalist(s)
Mickey MacGowan	Featherweight	Francecchini (ITA); L	did not advance				17
John "Jock" MacGregor	Flyweight	bye	Vitria (ESP); W	McKenzie (GBR); L	did not advance		5
Stephen Rennie	Flyweight	bye	Nyffeler (SUI); W	LaBarba (USA); L	did not advance		5

Opponent nation	Wins	Losses	Percent
Belgium	0	2	.000
Great Britain	0	3	.000
Ireland	2	0	1.000
Italy	2	1	.667
Luxembourg	1	0	1.000
Norway	1	0	1.000
Spain	1	0	1.000
Sweden	1	0	1.000
Switzerland	1	0	1.000
United States	2	4	.333
Uruguay	1	0	1.000
Total	12	10	.545

Round	Wins	Losses	Percent
Round of 32	4	2	.667
Round of 16	5	2	.714
Quarterfinals	2	3	.400
Semifinals	0	2	.000
Final	0	0	–
Bronze match	1	1	.500
Total	12	10	.545

== Cycling ==
A single cyclist represented Canada in 1924. It was the nation's fourth appearance in the sport.

=== Road cycling ===
Ranks given are within the heat.

Cyclist	Event	Final	
Cyclist	Event	Result	Rank
Joe Laporte	Time trial	8:11:22.0	54

=== Track cycling ===
Ranks given are within the heat.

Cyclist	Event	First round		First repechage		Quarterfinals		Second repechage		Semifinals		Final	
Cyclist	Event	Result	Rank	Result	Rank	Result	Rank	Result	Rank	Result	Rank	Result	Rank
Joe Laporte	50 km	N/A										unknown	8–36

== Rowing ==
14 rowers represented Canada in 1924. It was the nation's fifth appearance in the sport, tying Belgium and Great Britain for most appearances. Canada won a pair of silver medals, its first rowing medals since 1912 and tying its best rowing result (a silver medal in 1904).

Ranks given are within the heat.

Rower	Event	Semifinals		Repechage		Final	
Rower	Event	Result	Rank	Result	Rank	Result	Rank
Hilton Belyea	Single sculls	unknown	3	did not advance			
Archibald Black; George MacKay; Colin Finlayson; William Wood	Coxless four	6:31.0	1 Q	N/A		7:18.0	2nd place, silver medalist(s)
Arthur Bell; Ivor Campbell; Robert Hunter; William Langford; Harold Little; John Smith; Warren Snyder; Norman Taylor; William Wallace	Eight	unknown	2 r	6:37.0	1 Q	6:49.0	2nd place, silver medalist(s)

== Sailing ==
A single sailor represented Canada in 1924. It was the nation's debut in the sport.

Sailor	Event	Qualifying				Final			
Sailor	Event	Race 1	Race 2	Race 3	Total	Race 1	Race 2	Total	Rank
Norm Robertson	Olympic monotype	7	7	N/A		did not advance			

== Shooting ==
Six sport shooters represented Canada in 1924. It was the nation's fourth appearance in the sport. The six-man clay pigeon teams finished second to earn Canada's first medal in shooting since 1908. The three members of the team who competed in the individual trap all finished in the top six, with Montgomery finishing outside the medals only because of a tie-breaker.

Shooter	Event	Final	
Shooter	Event	Score	Rank
George Beattie	Trap	96	6
Robert Montgomery	Trap	97	4
Samuel Vance	Trap	96	6
William Barnes; George Beattie; John Black; Robert Montgomery; Samuel Newton; Samuel Vance	Team clay pigeons	360	2nd place, silver medalist(s)

== Wrestling ==
=== Freestyle wrestling ===
Men's

Athlete	Event	Round of 32	Round of 16	Quarterfinal	Semifinal	Final	
Athlete	Event	Opposition Result	Opposition Result	Opposition Result	Opposition Result	Opposition Result	Rank
Clifford Chilcott	Featherweight	bye	Cavallini (ITA); W	Angelo (AUS); W	Reed (USA); L Silver medal semifinal Naito (JPN); L	did not advance	
Walter Montgomery	Lightweight	—N/a	Vis (USA); L	did not advance	Silver medal semifinal Wikström (FIN); L	did not advance	
George Rumple	Light heavyweight	—N/a	Baillot (FRA); W	Spellman (USA); L	Silver medal semifinal Wilson (GBR); L	did not advance	
Donald Stockton	Welterweight	—N/a	bye	Bacon (GBR); W	Lookabough (USA); L Bronze medal semifinal Müller (SUI); L	did not advance	
James Trifunov	Bantamweight	—N/a	Sansum (GBR); L	did not advance			
