= Rowing at the 1924 Summer Olympics – Men's eight =

Men's eight at the Games of the VIII Olympiad
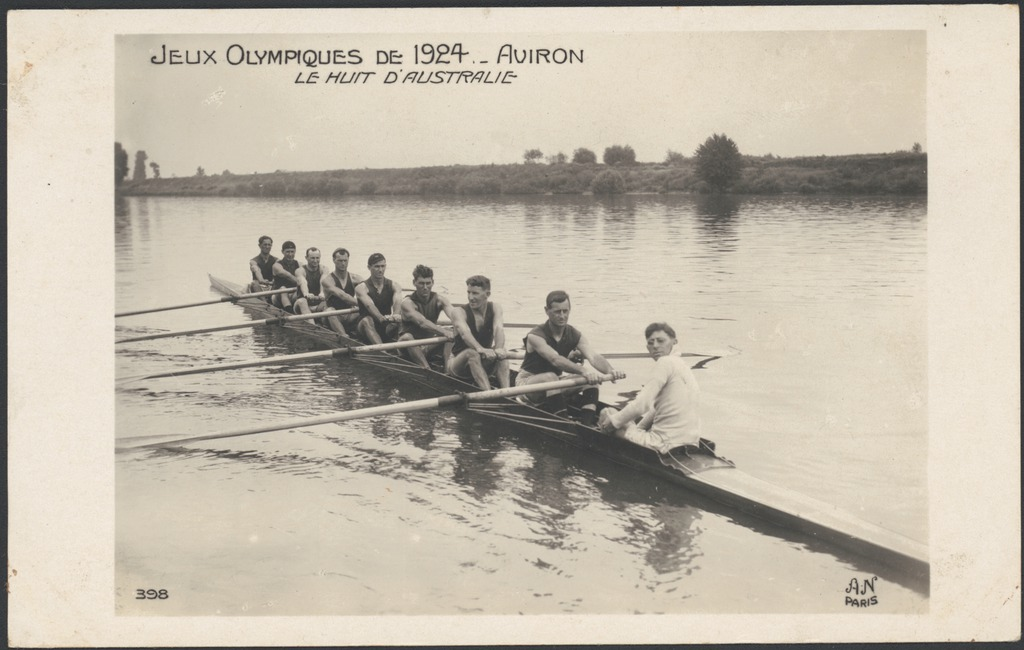
- Postcard of the Australian team
- Venue: Seine
- Dates: 15–17 July 1924
- Competitors: 90 from 10 nations
- Winning time: 6:33.4

Medalists
1st place, gold medalist(s)		United States: Leonard Carpenter; Howard Kingsbury; Alfred Lindley; John Miller; James Stillman Rockefeller; Frederick Sheffield; Benjamin Spock; Alfred Wilson; Laurence Stoddard (cox)
2nd place, silver medalist(s)		Canada: Arthur Bell; Robert Hunter; William Langford; Harold Little; John Smith; Warren Snyder; Norman Taylor; William Wallace; Ivor Campbell (cox)
3rd place, bronze medalist(s)		Italy: Ante Katalinić; Frane Katalinić; Šimun Katalinić; Giuseppe Crivelli; Latino Galasso; Petar Ivanov; Bruno Sorić; Carlo Toniatti; Vittorio Gliubich (cox)

The men's eight event was part of the rowing programme at the 1924 Summer Olympics. The competition, the sixth appearance of the event, was held from 13 to 17 July 1924 on the river Seine. Ten teams (90 competitors), each from a different nation, competed. The event was won by the United States, the nation's second consecutive and fourth overall victory in the event. Canada took silver, its first medal in the men's eight since 1908. Italy, making its debut in the event, took bronze.

Among the American rowers was Benjamin Spock, who later became more known for his work in pediatrics and politics.

== Background ==
This was the sixth appearance of the event. Rowing had been on the programme in 1896 but was cancelled due to bad weather. The men's eight has been held every time that rowing has been contested, beginning in 1900.

Great Britain and the United States were the dominant nations in the event, with the nations winning all five prior Olympic men's eight competitions between them. The United States held a 3–2 edge and the reigning crown. For the first time, Great Britain's top entry was not the Leander Club; instead, the Thames Rowing Club (winners of the Grand Challenge Cup at Henley in 1923) was the British boat in 1924. The Americans were represented by a crew from Yale University. Other contenders included the 1923 European Rowing Championships winners from Italy.

Czechoslovakia, Hungary, and Switzerland entered but withdrew before the competition.

Argentina, Australia, Italy, and Spain each made their debut in the event (though Australian rowers had appeared as part of the Australasia team in 1912). Belgium, Canada, France, Great Britain, and the United States each made their fourth appearance, tied for most among nations to that point.

== Competition format ==
The "eight" event featured nine-person boats, with eight rowers and a coxswain. It was a sweep rowing event, with the rowers each having one oar (and thus each rowing on one side). The course used the 2000 metres distance that became the Olympic standard in 1912.

For the first time since 1900, there were more than 2 boats per heat. The tournament also introduced the repechage, allowing boats that did not win a race to have another opportunity to advance. The 1924 competition featured two main rounds (semifinals and a final) and one repechage.

- Semifinals: Three heats of 3 or 4 boats each. The top boat in each heat (3 boats total) advanced directly to the final; the last place boat (3 boats) was eliminated; the middle boats (2nd place in the heats of 3, 2nd and 3rd places in the heat of 4) went to the repechage.
- Repechage: One heat of 4 boats. The winner advanced to the final; the other 3 boats were eliminated.
- Final: One heat of 4 boats. Determined the medals and 4th place.

== Schedule ==
Date	Time	Round
Tuesday, 15 July 1924		Semifinals; Repechage
Thursday, 17 July 1924		Final

== Results ==
=== Semifinals ===
The top boat in each semifinal advanced to the final, with the second-placed boat (and the third-placed boat, in the semifinal with four boats) going to the repechage. The last placed boat in each semifinal was eliminated.

==== Semifinal 1 ====
Rank	Rowers	Coxswain	Nation	Time	Notes
1	Reginald Bare; Cecil Chandler; Horace Debenham; Peter Dulley; Ian Fairbairn; Alexander Long; Harold Morphy; Charles Rew	Jack Godwin	Great Britain	6:04.0	Q
2	Arthur D'Anvers; Gérard De Gezelle; R. De Landtsheere; August Geinger; Léon Lippens; Hippolyte Schouppe; Robert Swartelé; Jean Van Silfhout	Marcel Wauters	Belgium	Unknown	R
3	Julio Alles; Alberto Anderson; Francisco Borgonovo; Tomas Cerrutti; Federico Lecot; David Nolting; Carlos Serantes; Armando Trabucco	Miguel Madero	Argentina	Unknown	R
4	Maurice Baudechon; Louis Carlier; Michel Fourny; Henri Gatineau; André Lancelot; Henri Menard; André Oriol; Fernand Oriol	J. Bétout	France	Unknown	

==== Semifinal 2 ====
Rank	Rowers	Coxswain	Nation	Time	Notes
1	Leonard Carpenter; Howard Kingsbury; Alfred Lindley; John Miller; James Stillman Rockefeller; Frederick Sheffield; Benjamin Spock; Alfred Wilson	Laurence Stoddard	United States	5:51.0	Q
2	Arthur Bell; Robert Hunter; William Langford; Harold Little; John Smith; Warren Snyder; Norman Taylor; William Wallace	Ivor Campbell	Canada	Unknown	R
3	Simon Bon; Cornelis Eecen; Antony Fennema; Roelof Hommema; Paul Maasland; Henk Rijnders; Gerrit Tromp; Egbertus Waller	Jacob Cremer	Netherlands	Unknown	

==== Semifinal 3 ====
Rank	Rowers	Coxswain	Nation	Time	Notes
1	Ante Katalinić; Frane Katalinić; Šimun Katalinić; Giuseppe Crivelli; Latino Galasso; Petar Ivanov; Bruno Sorić; Carlo Toniatti	Vittorio Gliubich	Italy	6:06.0	Q
2	Frank Cummings; Herbert Graetz; Walter Jarvis; Walter Pfeiffer; Arthur Scott; William Sladden; Alf Taeuber; Ted Thomas	Robert Cummings	Australia	Unknown	R
3	Leandro Coll; Jaime Giralt; José Lasplazas; Ricardo Massana; Eliseo Morales; Enrique Pérez; Juan Riba; Luis Omedes	José Martínez	Spain	Unknown	

=== Repechage ===
The top boat advanced to the final, with the other three eliminated.

Rank	Rowers	Coxswain	Nation	Time	Notes
1	Arthur Bell; Robert Hunter; William Langford; Harold Little; John Smith; Warren Snyder; Norman Taylor; William Wallace	Ivor Campbell	Canada	6:37.0	Q
2	Julio Alles; Alberto Anderson; Francisco Borgonovo; Tomas Cerrutti; Federico Lecot; David Nolting; Carlos Serantes; Armando Trabucco	Miguel Madero	Argentina	6:42.0	
3	Frank Cummings; Herbert Graetz; Walter Jarvis; Walter Pfeiffer; Arthur Scott; William Sladden; Alf Taeuber; Ted Thomas	Robert Cummings	Australia	6:47.0	
4	Arthur D'Anvers; Gérard De Gezelle; R. De Landtsheere; August Geinger; Léon Lippens; Hippolyte Schouppe; Robert Swartelé; Jean Van Silfhout	Marcel Wauters	Belgium	6:52.0	

=== Final ===
Rank	Rowers	Coxswain	Nation	Time
1st place, gold medalist(s)	Leonard Carpenter; Howard Kingsbury; Alfred Lindley; John Miller; James Stillman Rockefeller; Frederick Sheffield; Benjamin Spock; Alfred Wilson	Laurence Stoddard	United States	6:33.4
2nd place, silver medalist(s)	Arthur Bell; Robert Hunter; William Langford; Harold Little; John Smith; Warren Snyder; Norman Taylor; William Wallace	Ivor Campbell	Canada	6:49.0
3rd place, bronze medalist(s)	Ante Katalinić; Frane Katalinić; Šimun Katalinić; Giuseppe Crivelli; Latino Galasso; Petar Ivanov; Bruno Sorić; Carlo Toniatti	Vittorio Gliubich	Italy	Unknown
4	Reginald Bare; Cecil Chandler; Horace Debenham; Peter Dulley; Ian Fairbairn; Alexander Long; Harold Morphy; Charles Rew	Jack Godwin	Great Britain	Unknown

== Sources ==
- Evans, Hilary; Gjerde, Arild; Heijmans, Jeroen; Mallon, Bill; et al. "Rowing at the 1924 Paris Summer Games: Men's coxed eight". Olympics at Sports-Reference.com. Sports Reference LLC. Archived from the original on 18 April 2020.
- Wudarski, Pawel (1999). "Wyniki Igrzysk Olimpijskich" (in Polish).
