= Croats of Italy =

Community of Croatian immigrants in Italy

Hrvati u Italiji Croati in Italia

Total population
- c. 23,000

Languages
- Croatian, Italian, Slavomolisano

Religion
- Mostly Roman Catholicism

Related ethnic groups
- Croats

Croats form a part of the permanent population of Italy (Croatian: Hrvati u Italiji, Italian: Croati in Italia). Traditionally, there is an autochthonous community in the Molise region known as the Molise Croats, but there are many other Croats living in or associated with Italy through other means, with the most numerous communities in Trieste, Rome, Padua and Milan. In 2010, persons with Croatian citizenship in Italy numbered 21,079.

Croats of Italy could mean any of the following:

- Molise Croats - a long-established Croatian population in the Molise region.
- Ethnic Croats to have relocated to Italy from any region to which Croats may be autochthonous (e.g. Republic of Croatia, Bosnia and Herzegovina and other countries).

== Molise Croats ==
Molise Croats, who were the first Croats to settle in Italy, at the time of the Ottoman expansion in the Balkans, are one of the linguistic minority officially recognised by the Italian Republic. They achieved protection as a minority on 5 November 1996 by an agreement signed between Croatia and Italy. According to 2001 census, there were 2,801 Molise Croats, of which 813 lived in San Felice del Molise (Croatian: Štifilić; Filić), 800 in Acquaviva Collecroce (Croatian: Kruč) and 468 in Montemitro (Croatian: Mundimitar). The number of Molise Croats is in decline.

== Other communities ==
Croats were also recorded in southern Italy, but they assimilated over time, in the provinces of Marche, Campania, Basilicata, Apulia, and elsewhere.

== Assimilation and Italianization ==
During the 19th century, the Italianization of Slavic surnames began in Italy. After 1918, this intensified, even before the fascists came to power. In September 1922, Italy signed an international convention on the protection of ethnic, linguistic and religious freedoms of national minorities, which it did not adhere to. With the fascists coming to power, Croatian surnames and toponyms were Italianized, including those in the southern Italy. In 1863, San Vito degli Schiavoni became and remains until today San Vito dei Normanni, although Croats founded it as early as 963.

== Associations, publications and media ==
In the region of Molise, there is the Federation of Croatian-Molise Cultural Associations which unifies the Association "Luigi Zara", the Foundation "Agostina Piccoli", the Association "Naš život" (English: Our Life) and the Association "Naš grad" (English: Our Town). The main association of all Croats of Italy is the Alliance of Croatian Associations as founded in 2001; this association consists of: the Croatian-Italian Association of Rome, the Croatian Union of Milano, the Croatian Union of Trieste, the Croatian Union of Venetia, the Croatian-Italian Association of Udine and the Association "Luigi Zara". Also, the Club of Friends of Croatia is active in Milano. A Croatian organization that has a longer history in Italy is the Pontifical Croatian College of St. Jerome, a Catholic college. Known as the Collegium Hieronymianum Illyricorum (Illyrian Hieronymian College; San Girolamo degli Illirici in Italian) since 1902, the college served Croatian Catholics, before being renamed Pontificium Collegium Chroaticum Sancti Hieronymi (Pontifical Croatian College of St. Jerome) in 1971. College publishes Croatian Roman directory. Another Croatian Catholic organization in Italy is the Domus Croatia "Dr. Ivan Merz", an organization of Croatian pilgrims. The Croatian Roman Community (Hrvatska rimska zajednica) also operates of Rome. Organisation "Croatian-Italian mosaic" in Rome hosts international folklore festival "CRoETnO festival".

The Foundation "Agostina Piccoli" and the Association "Naš život" are issuing the bilingual magazine "Riča živa/Parola viva" (English: Living Word), while the Alliance of Croatian Associations prints also the bilingual magazine "Insieme" (Croatian: Zajedno, English: Together).

== Famous Croats of Italy and Italians with Croatian ancestry ==
=== Academia ===
- Benedetto Cotrugli (Croatian: Benedikt "Beno" Kotruljević) - merchant, economist, scientist, diplomat and humanist
- Matthew Ferchi (Matija Ferkić or Matija Frkić) - philosopher
- William Klinger - historian
- Serafino Raffaele Minich (or Serafin Rafael Minić) - mathematician
- Franciscus Patricius (Croatian: Franjo Petriš or Frane Petrić, Italian: Francesco Patrizi) - philosopher and scientist
- Fausto Veranzio (Latin: Faustus Verantius; Croatian: Faust Vrančić; Hungarian and Vernacular Latin: Verancsics Faustus) - polymath and bishop

=== Arts ===
- Federico Bencovich - painter from Dalmatia working in Italy.
- Giulio Clovio (Juraj Julije Klović) - illuminator, miniaturist, and painter
- Giovanni Dalmata (Croatian: Ivan Duknović, born Ioannes Stephani Duknovich de Tragurio, also known as Giovanni Duknovich di Traù in Italy and Ivan Stjepanov Duknović in Croatia) - sculptor
- Giorgio da Sebenico (lit. 'George of Sebenico' or Giorgio Orsini or Juraj Dalmatinac (lit. 'George the Dalmatian)) - sculptor and architect
- Lovro Dobričević (or Lorenzo Bon, Lorenzo di Marino da Cattaro[) - painter
- Niccolò di Giovanni Fiorentino (Croatian: Nikola Firentinac) called Nicolas of Florence - Renaissance sculptor and architect
- Francesco Laurana (also known as Francesco de la Vrana and Frane Vranjanin) - sculptor
- Martino Rota (also known as Martin Rota and Martin Rota Kolunić) - painter and engraver
- Giorgio Schiavone, (or Juraj Ćulinović, Giorgio di Tomaso Schiavone) - Renaissance painter, active in North Italy and Dalmatia.

=== Business ===
- Sergio Marchionne - Italian-Canadian businessman (widely known for his association with automakers Fiat and Chrysler)

=== Film ===
- Callisto Cosulich - Italian film critic, author, journalist and screenwriter.
- Gianni Garko (born Giovanni Garcovich) - actor, often billed as John Garko and occasionally Gary Hudson
- Sylva Koscina - actress. Born in Zagreb to a Greek father and Polish mother
- Rita Rusić (also known as Rita Cecchi Gori) - producer, actress and singer.
- Xenia Valderi (Xenia Valdameri) - actress. The daughter of a Dalmatian father and German mother

=== Literature ===
- Vincenzo Bettiza - novelist, journalist and politician
- Alberto Moravia - novelist and journalist. (His mother Teresa Iginia de Marsanich, was of Dalmatian origin)
- Gian Francesco Biondi (Ivan Franc Biundovic) - writer

=== Music ===
- Andrea Antico (also Andrea Antico da Montona, Anticho, Antiquo) - music printer, editor, publisher and composer
- Ivan Mane Jarnović (Italian: Giovanni Mane Giornovichi) - violinist and composer
- Rancore (born Tarek Iurcic) - rapper. His father is from Croatia and his mother from Egypt.
- Antonio Smareglia - opera composer.

=== Politics ===
- Otokar Keršovani - journalist, literary critic, publicist and communist politician.

=== Science ===
- Roger Joseph Boscovich - physicist, astronomer, mathematician, philosopher, diplomat, poet, theologian, Jesuit priest, and a polymath
- Giovanni Luppis (Giovanni (Ivan) Biagio Luppis Freiherr von Rammer sometimes also known by the Croatian name of Vukić) - inventor

=== Sports ===
- Aldo Andretti - race car driver
- Mario Andretti - race car driver
- Saša Bjelanović - footballer
- Antonio Blasevich - footballer and coach
- Tarcisio Burgnich - football
- Gino Gardassanich - football
- Andrea de Adamich - racing car driver
- Gabre Gabric (Ljubica Gabrić-Calvesi) - track and field athlete
- Latino Galasso - rower
- Viktor Galović - tennis player.
- Vittorio Gliubich (born Viktor Ljubić) - Italian rowing coxswain
- Petar Ivanov (rower) - rower
- Ante Katalinić (Italian: Antonio Cattalinich) - rower
- Frane Katalinić (Italian: Francesco Cattalinich) - rower
- Šimun Katalinić (Italian: Simeone Cattalinich) - rower
- Giovanni Martinolich - chess master
- Marcello Mihalich - football player and coach
- Emir Murati - football
- Abdon Pamich - race walker
- Nikola Radulović - basketball
- Max Romih (Massimiliano "Massimo" Romi) - chess master.
- Stefano Serchinic - race walker
- Roko Šimić - footballer
- Bruno Sorić (Italian: Bruno Sorich) - rower
- Carlo Toniatti - rower
- Andrea Trinchieri - basketball coach
- Uros Vico - tennis
- Antonio Vojak - football
- Oliviero Vojak - football

=== Other ===
- Lidia Bastianich - celebrity chef, television host, author, and restaurateur.
- Ottavio Missoni - fashion designer
- Nina Morić - model
- Marco Polo - explorer (unconfirmed though some reputable sources suggest Polo was born Marko Pilich in Korcula)
- Pier Paolo Vergerio - Italian papal nuncio and later Protestant reformer.
- Oltremarini - Dalmatian infantry corps organized within the Venetian navy as the elite infantry.
- Umberto Zadnich - serial killer and sex offender

== See also ==
- Croatia–Italy relations
- Croats
- List of Croats
- Immigration to Italy
- Italians of Croatia
