= Spain at the 1924 Summer Olympics =

- IOC code: ESP
- NOC: Spanish Olympic Committee

in Paris
- Competitors: 95 (93 men, 2 women) in 15 sports
- Flag bearer: Félix Mendizábal
- Medals: Gold 0 Silver 0 Bronze 0 Total 0

Summer Olympics appearances (overview)
- 1900; 1904–1912; 1920; 1924; 1928; 1932; 1936; 1948; 1952; 1956; 1960; 1964; 1968; 1972; 1976; 1980; 1984; 1988; 1992; 1996; 2000; 2004; 2008; 2012; 2016; 2020; 2024

Spain competed at the 1924 Summer Olympics in Paris, France. 95 competitors, 93 men and 2 women, took part in 44 events in 15 sports.

== Athletics ==
Thirteen athletes represented Spain in 1924. It was the nation's second appearance in the sport.

Ranks given are within the heat.

Athlete	Event	Heats		Quarterfinals		Semifinals		Final	
Athlete	Event	Result	Rank	Result	Rank	Result	Rank	Result	Rank
José Andía	Cross country	N/A						Did not finish	
Dionisio Carreras	Marathon	N/A						2:57:18.4	9
Jesús Diéguez	Cross country	N/A						Did not finish	
Juan Junqueras	100 m	11.3	4	Did not advance					
Juan Junqueras	200 m	Unknown	2 Q	Unknown	6	Did not advance			
José-María Larrabeiti	100 m	Unknown	5	Did not advance					
José-María Larrabeiti	200 m	Unknown	5	Did not advance					
Gabino Lizarza	Discus throw	N/A				34.20	9	Did not advance	
Félix Mendizábal	100 m	11.4	1 Q	Unknown	6	Did not advance			
Félix Mendizábal	200 m	Unknown	4	Did not advance					
Joaquín Miquel	5000 m	N/A				Unknown	11	Did not advance	
Diego Ordóñez	100 m	Unknown	3	Did not advance					
Diego Ordóñez	200 m	Unknown	5	Did not advance					
Miguel Palau	5000 m	N/A				Unknown	11	Did not advance	
Miguel Palau	Cross country	N/A						Did not finish	
Amador Palma	Cross country	N/A						Did not finish	
Miguel Peña	Cross country	N/A						41:34.0	14
Fabián Velasco	Cross country	N/A						39:07.6	13
José-María Larrabeiti; Juan Junqueras; Félix Mendizábal; Diego Ordóñez	4 × 100 m relay	N/A		44.2	3	Did not advance			
José Andía; Jesús Diéguez; Joaquín Miquel; Miguel Palau; Fabián Velasco	3000 m team	N/A				30	4	Did not advance	
José Andía; Jesús Diéguez; Amador Palma; Miguel Peña; Miguel Palau; Fabián Velasco	Team cross country	N/A						Did not finish	

== Boxing ==
Seven boxers represented Spain at the 1924 Games. It was the nation's debut in the sport. Biete and Sánchez were the most successful Spanish boxers, each reaching the quarterfinals.

Boxer	Weight class	Round of 32	Round of 16	Quarterfinals	Semifinals	Final / Bronze match	
Boxer	Weight class	Opposition Score	Opposition Score	Opposition Score	Opposition Score	Opposition Score	Rank
Emilio Bautista	Featherweight	Bye	Abarca (CHI); L	Did not advance			9
Ruperto Biete	Flyweight	Bye	McDonagh (IRL); W	Castellenghi (ITA); L	Did not advance		5
Luis Bru	Featherweight	Devergnies (BEL); L	Did not advance				17
José Pastor	Bantamweight	Bye	Lemouton (FRA); L	Did not advance			9
Antonio Sánchez	Bantamweight	Bye	Weidel (SUI); W	Andrén (SWE); L	Did not advance		5
Vicente Valdero	Lightweight	Reilly (ARG); W	Beland (RSA); L	Did not advance			9
Lorenzo Vitria	Flyweight	Bye	MacGregor (CAN); L	Did not advance			9

Opponent nation	Wins	Losses	Percent
Argentina	1	0	1.000
Belgium	0	1	.000
Canada	0	1	.000
Chile	0	1	.000
France	0	1	.000
Ireland	1	0	1.000
Italy	0	1	.000
South Africa	0	1	.000
Sweden	0	1	.000
Switzerland	1	0	1.000
Total	3	7	.300

Round	Wins	Losses	Percent
Round of 32	1	1	.500
Round of 16	2	4	.333
Quarterfinals	0	2	.000
Semifinals	0	0	–
Final	0	0	–
Bronze match	0	0	–
Total	3	7	.300

== Diving ==
Three divers, all men, represented Spain in 1924. It was the nation's debut in the sport. Ranks given are within the heat.

Men

Diver	Event	Semifinals			Final		
Diver	Event	Points	Score	Rank	Points	Score	Rank
Francisco Ortiz	Plain high diving	41.5	117	9	Did not advance		
Antonio Tort	10 m platform	35	229.4	7	Did not advance		
Antonio Tort	Plain high diving	40	90	8	Did not advance		
Santiago Ulio	10 m platform	35	204.8	7	Did not advance		
Santiago Ulio	Plain high diving	36	102	7	Did not advance		

== Equestrian ==
Four equestrians represented Spain in 1924. It was the nation's debut in the sport.

Equestrian	Event	Final		
Equestrian	Event	Score	Time	Rank
José Álvarez	Jumping	18.00	2:31.0	9
Emilio López	Jumping	Did not finish		
Nemesio Martínez	Jumping	22.00	2:17.2	16
José Navarro	Jumping	33.75	3:02.4	30
José Álvarez; Emilio López; Nemesio Martínez; José Navarro	Team jumping	73.75	N/A	8

== Fencing ==
13 fencers, all men, represented Spain in 1924. It was the nation's second appearance in the sport, and first since 1900.

Men

Ranks given are within the pool.

Fencer	Event	Round 1		Round 2		Quarterfinals		Semifinals		Final	
Fencer	Event	Result	Rank	Result	Rank	Result	Rank	Result	Rank	Result	Rank
Julián de Olivares	Sabre	N/A				0–5	6	Did not advance			
Félix de Pomés	Épée	3–6	8	N/A		Did not advance					
Félix de Pomés	Foil	0–4	5	Did not advance							
Juan Delgado	Foil	2–1	2 Q	4–1	2 Q	4–1	1 Q	1–4	5	Did not advance	
Diego Díez	Foil	2–2	3 Q	2–3	5	Did not advance					
Domingo García	Épée	8–1	1 Q	N/A		7–3	1 Q	4–7	7	Did not advance	
Santiago García	Foil	0–2	3 Q	0–5	6	Did not advance					
Julio González	Sabre	N/A				0–5	6	Did not advance			
Fernando Guillén	Sabre	N/A				1–6	7	Did not advance			
Carlos Miguel	Épée	1–8	10	N/A		Did not advance					
Manuel Toledo	Sabre	N/A				0–6	7	Did not advance			
Miguel Zabalza	Épée	2–7	9	N/A		Did not advance					
Julián de Olivares; Julio González; Fernando Guillén; Jesús López de Lara; Jaime Mela	Team sabre	Bye		N/A		0–2	3	Did not advance			
Félix de Pomés; Juan Delgado; Diego Díez; Domingo García; Santiago García	Team foil	0–2	3	N/A		Did not advance					
Félix de Pomés; Juan Delgado; Diego Díez; Domingo García; Jesús López de Lara; Miguel Zabalza	Team épée	1.5–0.5	1 Q	N/A		2–0	2 Q	0–2	3	Did not advance	

== Football ==
Spain competed in the Olympic football tournament for the second time in 1924. In an unfortunate draw for them (and Italy), they faced Italy in the first round. The Italians came out the better, though it was a Spanish own goal that was the difference in the otherwise scoreless match.

Round 1

May 25, 1924
15:30

Italy	1–0	Spain
Vallana 84' (o.g.)	Report

Stade Olympique, Colombes
Attendance: 20,000
Referee: Marcel Slawik (FRA)

Final rank
17th place

== Polo ==
Spain sent a polo team to the Olympics for the second time in 1924. The Spanish team finished fourth in the five-team round-robin.

Ranks given are within the pool.

Players	Event	Round robin				
Players	Event	Wins	Losses	Points for	Points against	Rank
Álvaro de Figueroa; Luis de Figueroa; Rafael Fernández; Hernando Fitz-James; Leopoldo Sáinz; Justo San Miguel	Men's polo	1	3	22	42	4

July 1

United States	15–2	Spain

July 4

Argentina	16–2	Spain

July 7

Great Britain	10–3	Spain

July 10

Spain	15–1	France

== Rowing ==
Ten rowers represented Spain in 1924. It was the nation's second appearance in the sport, and first since 1900.

Ranks given are within the heat.

Rower	Event	Semifinals		Repechage		Final	
Rower	Event	Result	Rank	Result	Rank	Result	Rank
Josep Balsells; Leandro Coll; Jaime Geralt; Ricardo Massana; Luis Omedes	Coxed four	Unknown	3	Did not advance			
Leandro Coll; Jaime Giralt; José Lasplazas; José Martínez; Ricardo Massana; Eliseo Morales; Enrique Pérez Soler; Juan Riba; Luis Omedes	Eight	Unknown	3	Did not advance			

== Sailing ==
Three sailors represented Spain in 1924. It was the nation's debut in the sport.

Sailor	Event	Qualifying				Final			
Sailor	Event	Race 1	Race 2	Race 3	Total	Race 1	Race 2	Total	Rank
Santiago Amat	Olympic monotype	2 Q	4	N/A		4	4	8	4
Santiago Amat; Arturo Masbové; Pedro Pi	6 metre class	7	6	8 (DNF)	21	Did not advance			8

== Shooting ==
Shooter	Event	Final	
Shooter	Event	Score	Rank
José María de Palleja	Trap	AC	NQ

== Swimming ==
Ranks given are within the heat.

Men

Swimmer	Event	Heats		Semifinals		Final	
Swimmer	Event	Result	Rank	Result	Rank	Result	Rank
Pedro Méndez	400 m freestyle	6:26.6	5	Did not advance			
Pedro Méndez	1500 m freestyle	26:23.5	5	Did not advance			
José Manuel Pinillo	100 m freestyle	1:14.2	5	Did not advance			
Ramón Berdemans; Pedro Méndez; Julio Perejordi; José Manuel Pinillo	4 × 200 m freestyle relay	12:02.4	4	Did not advance			

== Tennis ==
Men

Athlete	Event	Round of 128	Round of 64	Round of 32	Round of 16	Quarterfinals	Semifinals	Final	
Athlete	Event	Opposition Score	Opposition Score	Opposition Score	Opposition Score	Opposition Score	Opposition Score	Opposition Score	Rank
Manuel Alonso	Singles	Bye	Bye	Robson (ARG); W 7–9, 6–4, 6–0, 6–4	Richards (USA); L 5–7, 8–10, 6–2, 3–6	Did not advance			
Eduardo Flaquer	Singles	Torralva (CHI); W 6–4, 3–6, 6–0, 6–0	Washer (BEL); L 1–6, 4–6, 5–7	Did not advance					
Raimundo Morales	Singles	Jacob (IND); L 2–6, 4–6, 4–6	Did not advance						
Francisco Sindreu	Singles	Bye	Richardson (RSA); L 4–6, 4–6, 3–6	Did not advance					
José María Alonso; Manuel Alonso	Doubles	—N/a	Kingscote / Wheatley (GBR); W 6–4, 6–3, 6–1	Harada / Okamoto (JPN); W 6–4, 4–6, 6–4, 6–4	Zerlentis / Papadopoulos (GBR); W 6–2, 9–7, 6–4	Richards / Hunter (USA); L 4–6, 4–6, 3–6	Did not advance		
Eduardo Flaquer; Ricardo Saprissa	Doubles	—N/a	Bye	Honda / Fukuda (JPN); W 6–2, 6–3, 6–3	Condon / Richardson (RSA); L 2–6, 3–6, 1–6	Did not advance			

Women

Athlete	Event	Round of 64	Round of 32	Round of 16	Quarterfinals	Semifinals	Final	
Athlete	Event	Opposition Score	Opposition Score	Opposition Score	Opposition Score	Opposition Score	Opposition Score	Rank
Lilí Álvarez	Singles	Bye	Scharman (USA); W 6–2, 6–2	Polley (IND); W 6–0, 6–3	Golding (FRA); L 5–7, 3–6	Did not advance		
Rosa Torras	Singles	Bye	Perelli (ITA); W 6–4, 4–6, 8–6	Jessup (USA); L 2–6, 0–6	Did not advance			
Lilí Álvarez; Rosa Torras	Doubles	—N/a	Bye	Billout / Bourgeois (FRA); L 6–2, 3–6, 4–6	Did not advance			

Mixed

Athlete	Event	Round of 32	Round of 16	Quarterfinals	Semifinals	Final	
Athlete	Event	Opposition Score	Opposition Score	Opposition Score	Opposition Score	Opposition Score	Rank
Eduardo Flaquer; Lilí Álvarez	Doubles	Bye	Bye	Jessup / Richards (USA); L 3–6, 0–6	Did not advance		
Ricardo Saprissa; Rosa Torras	Doubles	Perelli / de Morpurgo (ITA); L 3–6, 8–10	Did not advance				

== Water polo ==
Spain made its second Olympic water polo appearance.

Roster

- Manuel Basté
- Antonio Bretos Muzas
- Jaime Cruells Folguera
- Jaime Fontanet
- Francesc Gibert
- Lluís Gibert
- Enrique Granados Gal
- José María Puig
- J. Trigo
- Mariano Trigo
- Alfonso Tusell Alonso

First round
- Bye
Quarterfinals

Sweden	9–0	Spain	Piscine des Tourelles

== Wrestling ==
=== Greco-Roman ===
Men's

Athlete	Event	First round	Second round	Third round	Fourth round	Fifth round	Sixth round	Seventh round	Eighth round	Rank
Athlete	Event	Opposition Result	Opposition Result	Opposition Result	Opposition Result	Opposition Result	Opposition Result	Opposition Result	Opposition Result	Rank
Domingo Sánchez	Featherweight	Penczik (AUT); L	Naito (JPN); L	Did not advance						=18
Francisco Solé	Lightweight	Coerse (NED); L	Michelsen (NOR); W	Frisenfeldt (DEN); L	Did not advance			—N/a		=13
Jordán Vallmajo	Featherweight	Naito (JPN); L	Väli (EST); L	Did not advance						=18
Emilio Vidal	Middleweight	Yalaz (TUR); L	Dumont (LUX); W	Okulicz-Kozaryn (POL); L	Did not advance				—N/a	=15
