= Murraylands =

Geographic region in the eastern part of South Australia

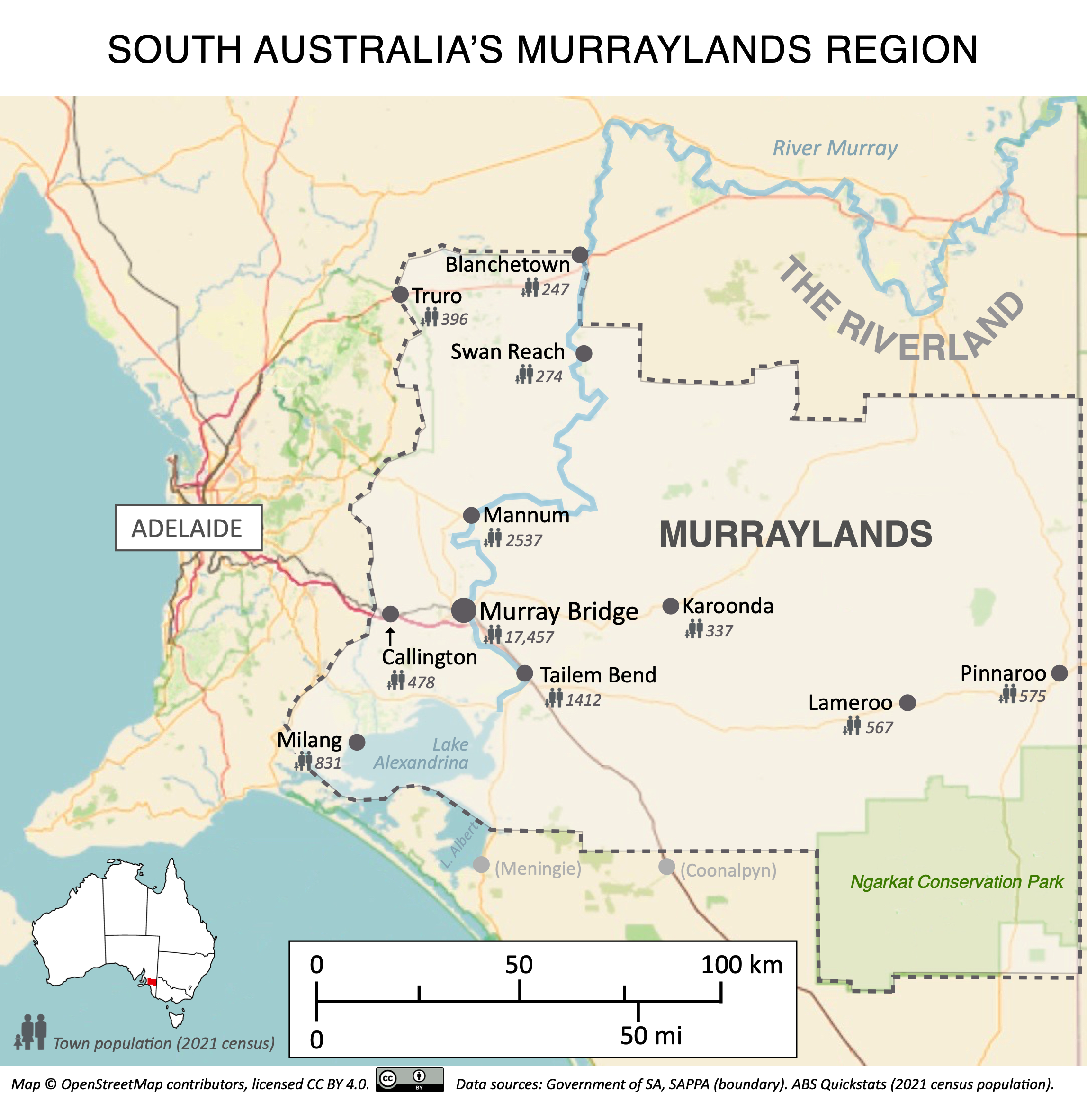
The Murraylands region takes its name from the River Murray, which runs through it and the Riverland, to its north, for 200 kilometres (120 miles)

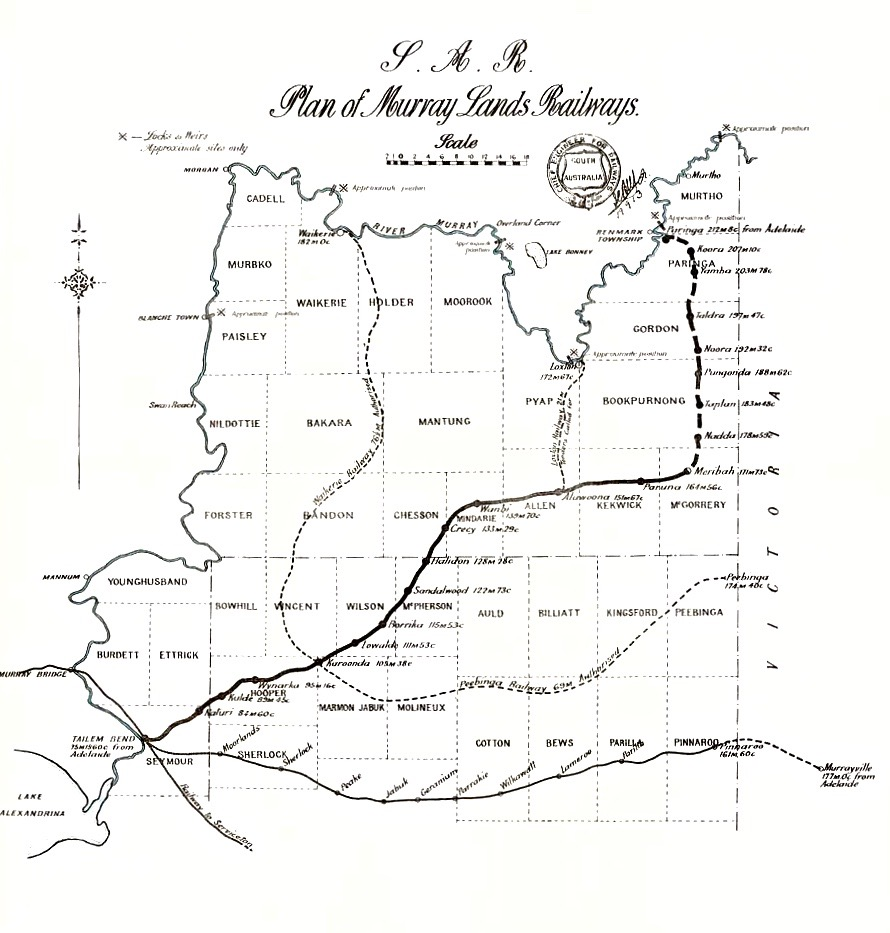
The South Australian Railways constructed 707 kilometres (439 miles) of lightly built railway lines, mainly in the 1910s, to encourage agricultural development throughout the Murraylands and what is now designated as the Riverland

The Murraylands is a geographical region of the Australian state of South Australia (SA); its name reflects that of the river running through it. Lying due east of South Australia's capital city, Adelaide, it extends from the eastern slopes of the Mount Lofty Ranges to the border with the state of Victoria, a distance of about 180 kilometres (110 miles). The north-to-south distance is about 130 kilometres (81 miles). The region's economy is centred on agriculture (especially vegetables, grains and livestock), and tourism, especially along its 200-kilometre (120-mile) frontage of the River Murray. (Note: The Government of South Australia stipulates "River" to be placed first when referring to the two major rivers of the state, the River Murray and River Torrens. Usage outside of South Australia is usually to place "River" last.)

The main towns in the region, in order of population at the 2016 census, are: (Note: A few kilometres outside the boundaries are Coonalpyn in the south and Meningie in the south-west, with populations of 1118 and 313 respectively; they are not included in this article.)

- Murray Bridge (16,560)
- Mannum (2640)
- Tailem Bend (1660)
- Milang (880)
- Lameroo (850)
- Pinnaroo (710)
- Callington (610)
- Truro (550)
- Karoonda (510)
- Blanchetown (310)
- Swan Reach (280).

These towns' populations totalled 24,600. People living outside the towns approximated 8,000. (Note: Difference between 32,600 population of council districts (adjusted for variations in settlements) and the total town populations.)

The region has a Mediterranean climate, with warm to hot, dry summers and mild winters. Mean maximum temperatures range from 22.3 °C (72 °F) in the south to 23.6 °C (74 °F) in the north; minimums are from 8.8 °C (48 °F) to 8.8 °C (48 °F) respectively.

== Regional context ==
The Murraylands region is long established in South Australia and the name is widely used by residents of the region and elsewhere in the state, but there is a multiplicity of names that refer to the geography in that part of the state. Local Government Areas and South Australian Government Regions continually change, and in the case of the Murraylands, its boundaries no longer correspond exactly with other types of divisions. The 2018 state electorate of Hammond had the nearest-equivalent borders. The South Australian Government region of which it was part was Murray and Mallee, extending about 170 kilometres (110 miles) north of the Murraylands to include the Riverland region; and extending to the south of the Murraylands to The Coorong. Of similar size to the Murray and Mallee region is Regional Development Australia's Murraylands and Riverland Region. A generic term, applied to a larger area than the Murraylands, is Murray Mallee. Tourism regions are different again: the South Australian Tourism Commission includes the Murraylands with the lakes at the mouth of the Murray, and The Coorong, in an area that earned $148 million in 2018. The area extends well into the state of Victoria, where it is known simply as The Mallee. (Note: The term mallee applies to various species of trees or woody plants, mainly of the genus Eucalyptus, which grow with multiple stems springing from an underground bulbous woody structure (a lignotuber, or mallee root), usually to a height of no more than 2‑9 metres (6‑30 feet). The term is also applied to land where mallee eucalypts grow – generally flat without hills or tall trees and where the climate is semi-arid.)

== Economy ==
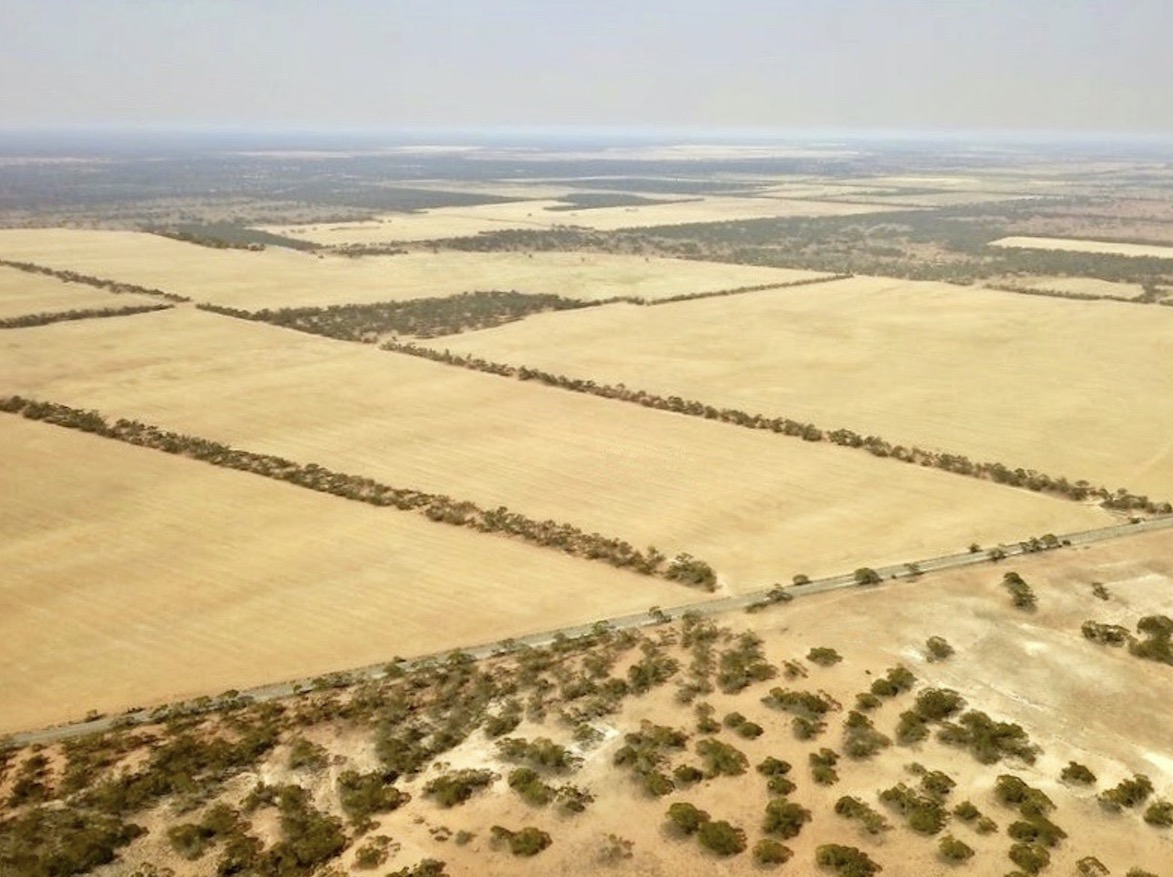
Wheat farming dominates much of the Murraylands landscape

The Murraylands economy is strongly reliant on primary industry. In 2014–15, primary production accounted for 41.6 per cent of the gross regional product in the SA Government's Murray and Mallee region. Within the Murraylands, the top three commodities were vegetables, grains and livestock. From 2001 to 2009 and 2017 to 2019, the Murraylands region was one of many regions in south-east Australia afflicted by severe drought, which significantly degraded the economy.

== Governance ==
As of 2021, local government councils within the Murraylands were:

- Mid Murray Council
- District Council of Loxton Waikerie (Note: Only the lightly populated south-eastern part of the council district is within the Murraylands.)
- District Council of Karoonda East Murray
- Rural City of Murray Bridge
- Southern Mallee District Council
- District Council of The Coorong (Note: Only the northern half of the council district is within the Murraylands.)

== Recreation and tourism ==
Recreational opportunities are abundant in the region. There are many sport facilities, reserves, parks, and trails for walking, cycling and horse riding. Many are connected to the River Murray. A major government program has funded a Murray Coorong Trail initiative, which will eventually connect a range of loop trails and experiences beside or near the river for 250 kilometres (160 miles) from Cadell in the Riverland to Salt Creek in the Coorong National Park; as of 2021 a 5 kilometres (3.1 miles) walking trail had been completed at Parnka Point in Coorong National Park and others were being constructed.

Recreational fishing and watersports are especially popular. The Murray Bridge Rowing Club, founded in 1909, is one of South Australia's oldest rowing clubs and has fostered many champions, including recent world champion and Olympic medal winner, James McRae; and Walter Pfeiffer, Walter Jarvis, Frank Cummings, Ted Thomas (rower), Herbert Graetz, William Sladden, Robert Cummings, Arthur Scott, and Alf Taeuber.

== Festivals and events ==
As of 2021:

- January: Asian Le Mans Series car races and other motorsport events, The Bend Motorsport Park, Tailem Bend
- January: Murray River Splash program (family fun activities)
- February: Murray Bridge Fringe, a three-day event
- March: Revolve24, "fast, safe, fun-on-a-bike weekend festival of cycling, The Bend Motorpsort Park, Tailem Bend
- September–April: Murray Bridge Speedway events
- September: Australian International Pedal Prix, Murray Bridge
- October: Callington Show
- October, March: Country by the River, a two-day music festival, Murray Bridge
- October, December: Motorsport Australia Championships, The Bend Motorsport Park, Tailem Bend
- November: All Steamed Up – engine, blacksmith and classic boat festival, Mannum
- Every month: Mannum Cars and Coffee, in Arnold Park, Mannum
- Various days: Murray Bridge Racing Club events and races.

== River Murray International Dark Sky Reserve ==
At the north-west corner of the Murraylands is the River Murray International Dark Sky Reserve, an area of 3200 square kilometres (1200 square miles) centred on the Swan Reach Conservation Park – one of the darkest locations in the world. The darkness is enhanced by the dry climate and low humidity with long periods of clear skies all year round. Low population, freedom from major development, and supportive policies of the Mid Murray Council regarding artificial light and future development were also crucial in the reserve being established.

== Conservation ==
Respect for the natural environment on which they depend is a strong characteristic of people in the area. The region has a number of national parks and conservation areas where bush walking, sightseeing, bird watching, camping, caravanning, 4-wheel driving and orienteering activities are welcome. They include:

- Ngarkat Conservation Park: a very large area at the south-east corner of the Murraylands. Bush tracks are available to 4-wheel vehicles.
- Ngaut Ngaut Conservation Park: near the town of Nildottie. Culturally significant traditional lands of the Nganguraku people; only accessible with a guided tour.
- Coorong National Park: 130 kilometres (81 miles) of coastal saltwater lagoons and wetlands scenery, home to many species of birds including native ducks and swans, pelicans, and migratory birds.

== Education ==
As of 2021, the Murraylands region had 47 educational establishments within and immediately outside its boundaries, as shown in the table.

Educational establishments
Pre-school	Primary	Secondary and TAFE*
Morgan Preschool**	Morgan Primary School**	Swan Reach Area School
Swan Reach and Area Kindergarten	Truro Primary School	Mannum Community College
Mannum Kindergarten	Blanchetown Primary School	Murray Bridge High School
Murray Bridge Preschool Kindergarten	Cambrai Area School**	Unity College, Murray Bridge
Callington Kindergarten	Swan Reach Primary School	Tyndale Christian School, Murray Bridge
Tailem Bend Kindergarten	Swan Reach Area School	St Joseph's School, Murray Bridge
Meningie Kindergarten**	Palmer Primary School	Meningie Area School**
Coonalpyn Kindergarten**	Mypolonga Primary School	Lameroo Regional Community School
Tintinara Preschool**	Murray Bridge South Primary School	Murray Bridge TAFE
Lameroo and District Kindergarten	Murray Bridge North Primary School	
Pinnaroo Kindergarten	Fraser Park Primary School, Murray Bridge	
Concordia Kindergarten	Murray Bridge State School	
	Callington Primary School	
	Tailem Bend Primary School	
	Meningie Area School**	
	Salt Creek Primary School	
	Coonalpyn Primary School	
	Coomandook Area School	
	Tintinara Area School**	
	Lameroo Regional Community School	
	Pinnaroo Primary School	
	Karoonda Area School	
	Mannum Community College Junior School	
	Tyndale Christian School, Murray Bridge	
	St Joseph's School, Murray Bridge	
	Unity College Junior School, Murray Bridge	
* TAFE: Technical and further education college. ** Located just outside the formal Murraylands boundary.

== Media ==
- WIN TV
- Power FM – 98.7 FM
- 5MU Radio Murray Bridge – 96.3 FM
- Flow FM – 97.7FM
- ABC Classic - 103.9 FM
- ABC Local Radio - 891 AM
- ABC News Radio - 972 AM
- ABC Radio National – 729 AM
- ABC Triple J - 105.5 FM
