= Šimun Katalinić =

Croatian rower

Simeone Cattalinich
Personal information
- Born: Šimun Katalinić; 17 September 1889 Zada, Kingdom of Dalmatia, Austria-Hungary (Now Zadar, Zadar County, Croatia)
- Died: 4 March 1977 (aged 87)
- Relatives: Ante Katalinić (brother); Frane Katalinić (brother)

Sport
- Sport: Rowing
- Club: Diadora, Zadar
Medal record
Men's rowing
Representing Italy
Olympic Games
Bronze medal – third place	1924 Paris	Eight
European Rowing Championships
Silver medal – second place	1922 Barcelona	Eight
Gold medal – first place	1923 Como	Eight

Šimun Katalinić (Italian: Simeone Cattalinich; 17 September 1889 – 4 March 1977) was a Croatian rower who competed for Italy at the 1924 Summer Olympics.

In 1924, he won the bronze medal as crew member of the Italian boat in the men's eight competition with two brothers: Frane and Ante, and Latino Galasso, Vittorio Gliubich, Giuseppe Crivelli, Petar Ivanov, Bruno Sorić, Carlo Toniatti.
