= Ante Katalinić =

Croatian rower

Personal information
- Born: 11 February 1895 Zadar, Kingdom of Dalmatia, Austria-Hungary
- Died: 31 October 1981 (aged 86)
- Relatives: Šimun Katalinić (brother); Frane Katalinić (brother)

Sport
- Sport: Rowing
- Club: Diadora, Zadar
Medal record
Men's rowing
Representing Italy
Olympic Games
Bronze medal – third place	1924 Paris	Eight
European Rowing Championships
Silver medal – second place	1922 Barcelona	Eight

Ante Katalinić (Italian: Antonio Cattalinich; 11 February 1895 – 31 October 1981) was a Croatian rower who competed for Italy in the 1924 Summer Olympics.

In 1924, he won the bronze medal as crew member of the Italian boat in the eights competition with two brothers: Frane and Šimun, and Latino Galasso, Vittorio Gliubich, Giuseppe Crivelli, Petar Ivanov, Bruno Sorić, Carlo Toniatti.
