= Frane Katalinić =

Croatian rower

Personal information
- Born: 4 October 1891 Zadar, Kingdom of Dalmatia, Austria-Hungary
- Died: 3 April 1976 (aged 84)
- Relatives: Šimun Katalinić (brother); Ante Katalinić (brother)

Sport
- Sport: Rowing
- Club: Diadora, Zadar
Medal record
Men's rowing
Representing Italy
Olympic Games
| Bronze medal – third place | 1924 Paris | Eight |
European Rowing Championships
| Silver medal – second place | 1922 Barcelona | Eight |
| Gold medal – first place | 1923 Como | Eight |

Frane Katalinić (Italian: Francesco Cattalinich; 4 October 1891 – 3 April 1976) was a Croatian rower who competed for Italy in the 1924 Summer Olympics.

In 1924, he won the bronze medal as crew member of the Italian boat in the men's eight competition with two brothers Ante and Šimun, and Latino Galasso, Vittorio Gliubich, Giuseppe Crivelli, Petar Ivanov, Bruno Sorić, Carlo Toniatti.
