= Jack Godwin =

British coxswain and magician

John Stuart Godwin (18 March 1904 – 22 June 1973), known as Jack Goodwin and later as Jack Stuart, was a British rowing coxswain and magician.

Godwin was born in 1904 in Bromley, Kent. He rowed for Great Britain in the 1924 Summer Olympics in Paris. He was affiliated with the Thames Rowing Club in Putney. He was coxswain for the men's eight. The Thames club won the Grand Challenge Cup at the Henley Royal Regatta in 1923, but only four members of that victorious crew, Ian Fairbairn, Godwin himself, Arthur Long, and Charles Rew, were present at the Paris Olympics. His team came in fourth in the Olympic competition. Godwin was again part of the Thames club team when they won the Grand Challenge Cup in 1927.

Godwin became a professional magician in the 1930s under the stage name "Jack Stuart". He and his sister Phyllis created a stage show that included their "Live Marionettes". During their performance they used puppets that hung below their own chins and were controlled by sticks. The illusion made for the appearance of tiny people with puppet bodies but real heads and faces (played by Jack and Phyllis). Jack appeared on early British television broadcasts in the era of John Logie Baird as a conjurer. He adapted his magic tricks to accommodate the new medium of television.

During World War II he served building the India and Burma railway in India. He then emigrated to Southern Rhodesia. He was a cousin to both New Zealand aviator James Gowing Godwin and author Robert Godwin. His uncle was Lt Sidney Godwin of Marshall's Horse.
