= Léon Lippens =

Léon Lippens may refer to:

- Léon Lippens (rower) (1903–?), Belgian rower
- Count Léon Lippens (naturalist) (1911–1986), Belgian naturalist and nobleman
