= Trabucco (surname) =

Trabucco is a surname. Notable people with the surname include:

- Armando Trabucco (1902–1984), Argentine rower
- Francesco Trabucco (1944–2021), Italian architect and designer
- Marcelo Trabucco (1934–2006), Argentine swimmer
- Mario Trabucco (1951–2025), Italian violinist
- Mario Valery-Trabucco (born 1987), Canadian ice hockey player
- Sam Trabucco, American business executive
