= Jean van Silfhout =

Jean van Silfhout may refer to:

- Jean van Silfhout (sportsman) (1902–1956), Dutch rower and swimmer
- Jean van Silfhout (rower) (1899–1942), Belgian Olympic rower
