= Eliseo Morales =

Eliseo Morales may refer to:

- Eliseo Morales (rower) (1898–1993), Spanish Olympic rower
- Eliseo Morales (rugby union) (born 1998), Argentine rugby union player
