= Enrique Pérez =

Enrique Pérez may refer to:

- Enrique Pérez de Guzmán, 2nd Count of Niebla (1375–1436), Spanish military figure
- Enrique Pérez de Guzmán, 4th Duke of Medina Sidonia (died 1512), Spanish duke
- Enrique Pérez (rower) (1896-?), Spanish rower
- Enrique Pérez Colman (1896–1957), Argentine politician
- Enrique Pérez Santiago (1916–1999), Puerto Rican hematologist
- Enrique Pérez Díaz (born 1938), known as Pachin, Spanish footballer
- Enrique Pérez (footballer) (born 1988), Mexican footballer
- Kike Pérez (born 1997), Spanish footballer

== See also ==
- Enrique López Pérez (born 1991), Spanish tennis player
