= Antony Fennema =

Dutch olympic rower (1902 - 1984)

- Fennema (1957)

Personal information
- Full name: Antony Gerardus Fennema
- Nationality: Dutch
- Born: 2 April 1902 Sneek, Netherlands
- Died: 30 July 1984 (aged 82) Amsterdam, Netherlands

Sport
- Sport: Rowing

Antony Gerardus Fennema (2 April 1902 – 30 July 1984) was a Dutch rower. He competed in the men's eight event at the 1924 Summer Olympics.
