= Ota Votík =

Czechoslovak rower

Personal information
- Born: 18 March 1895 Vysoký Chlumec
- Died: 14 December 1972 (aged 77) Teplice

Sport
- Sport: Rowing
- Club: Roudnice nad Labem
Medal record
Men's rowing
Representing Czechoslovakia
European Rowing Championships
| Bronze medal – third place | 1923 Como | Eight |

Otakar Votík (18 March 1895 – 14 December 1972) was a Czech rower. He competed at the 1920 Summer Olympics in Antwerp with the men's eight where they were eliminated in round one.
