= Gérard De Gezelle =

Belgian rower (1903–1978)

Personal information
- Full name: Gerardus Polydorus De Gezelle
- Nationality: Belgian
- Born: 29 January 1903; Ghent, Belgium
- Died: 5 September 1978 (aged 75); Ghent, Belgium

Sport
- Sport: Rowing

Gérard De Gezelle (29 January 1903 – 5 September 1978) was a Belgian rower. He competed in the men's eight event at the 1924 Summer Olympics.
