= Cecil Chandler =

British rower

Personal information
- Full name: Cecil George Chandler
- Nationality: British
- Born: 13 January 1902
- Died: 29 July 1958 (aged 56)

Sport
- Sport: Rowing

Cecil George Chandler (5 March 1902 – 29 July 1958) was a British rower. He competed in the men's eight event at the 1924 Summer Olympics.
