= 1922 European Rowing Championships =

- Venue: Port of Barcelona
- Location: Barcelona, Catalonia, Spain

The 1922 European Rowing Championships were rowing championships held in the Port of Barcelona in the Spanish city Barcelona. The competition was for men only and they competed in five boat classes (M1x, M2x, M2+, M4+, M8+), the same ones as had been used at the 1920 Summer Olympics in Antwerp.

== Medal summary ==
Event	Gold		Silver		Bronze	
Event	Country & rowers	Time	Country & rowers	Time	Country & rowers	Time
M1x	Switzerland; Rudolf Bosshard		Belgium; Félix Taymans		France; Marc Detton	
M2x	Switzerland; Hans Schöchlin; Karl Schöchlin		Italy; Erminio Dones; Lorenzo Salvini		Belgium; Lucien Brouha; Jules George	
M2+	Switzerland; Édouard Candeveau; Alfred Felber; Émile Lachapelle (cox)		Italy; Vincenzo Fabiano; Francesco Fabiano; Gino Bettini (cox)		France	
M4+	France; Charles Schlewer; Metzelaire; Lehmann; Kirmann		Switzerland; Franz Siegenthaler; Charles Barrelet; Alois Reinhard; Otto Bühlmann; Werner Strebel (cox)		Belgium; Emile Guillaume; Paul Fremineur; Fernand van den Heule; Désiré Strohl	
M8+	France; Dodille; Lumpp; Marchal; Masson; Rochet; Poulier; Bertheaux; Giraud		Italy; Luigi Miller; Carlo Toniatti; Frane Katalinić; Simeone Sofonia; Šimun Katalinić; Alfredo Toniatti; Ante Katalinić; Bruno Sorić; Latino Galasso (cox)		Hungary; H. Istvan Keresztes; László Józsa; Lajos Wick; Ferenc Kirchknopf; István Szendeffy; Zoltán Török; Kálmán Jesze; Sándor Hautzinger; Károly Koch (cox)	
