= Marcel Wauters =

Belgian coxswain

Personal information
- Nationality: Belgian
- Born: 26 June 1894

Sport
- Sport: Rowing

Marcel Wauters (born 26 June 1894, date of death unknown) was a Belgian rowing coxswain. He competed in two events at the 1924 Summer Olympics.
