= Federico Lecot =

Argentine rower

Personal information
- Nationality: Argentine
- Born: 1891
- Died: Unknown

Sport
- Sport: Rowing

Federico Lecot (born 1891, date of death unknown) was an Argentine rower. He competed in the men's eight event at the 1924 Summer Olympics.
