= Henri Menard =

French rower

Personal information
- Nationality: French
- Born: 4 May 1902
- Died: 3 December 1977 (aged 75)

Sport
- Sport: Rowing

Henri Menard (4 May 1902 – 3 December 1977) was a French rower. He competed in the men's eight event at the 1924 Summer Olympics.
