= David Nolting =

Argentine rower

Personal information
- Full name: David Eduardo Nölting
- Born: 21 June 1904; Buenos Aires, Argentina
- Died: 3 March 1990; Buenos Aires, Argentina

Sport
- Sport: Rowing

David Eduardo Nolting (born 21 June 1904 - 3 March 1990) was an Argentine rower. He competed in the men's eight event at the 1924 Summer Olympics.
