= Robert Swartelé =

Belgian rower

Personal information
- Born: Robert Charles Swartelé; 22 June 1900 Ghent, Belgium
- Died: 7 November 1967 (aged 67) Zelzate, Belgium

Sport
- Sport: Rowing
- Club: KRSG, Gent
Medal record
Men's rowing
Representing Belgium
European Rowing Championships
Bronze medal – third place	1926 Lucerne	Eight
Bronze medal – third place	1927 Como	Coxed four

Robert Charles Swartelé (22 June 1900 – 7 November 1967) was a Belgian rower. He competed at the 1924 Summer Olympics in Paris with the men's eight where they were eliminated in the round one repechage.
