= Arthur D'Anvers =

Belgian rower

Personal information
- Full name: Arthur Ernest D'Anvers
- Nationality: Belgian
- Born: 11 June 1898; Ghent, Belgium
- Died: 10 June 1966 (aged 67); Ghent, Belgium

Sport
- Sport: Rowing
- Club: Royal Club Nautique de Gand

Arthur Ernest D'Anvers (11 June 1898 – 10 June 1966) was a Belgian rower. He competed in the men's eight event at the 1924 Summer Olympics.
