= Gerrit Tromp =

Dutch rower

Personal information
- Nationality: Dutch
- Born: 24 October 1901; Leeuwarden, Netherlands
- Died: 2 December 1938 (aged 37); The Hague, Netherlands

Sport
- Sport: Rowing

Gerrit Tromp (24 October 1901 – 2 December 1938) was a Dutch rower. He competed in the men's eight event at the 1924 Summer Olympics.
