= Miguel Madero =

Argentine coxswain

Personal information
- Full name: Miguel Alejandro Madero Irigoyen
- Born: 3 April 1896; Buenos Aires, Argentina

Sport
- Sport: Rowing

Miguel Alejandro Madero Irigoyen (born 3 April 1896, date of death unknown) was an Argentine rowing coxswain. He competed in the men's eight event at the 1924 Summer Olympics.
