= Ferdinand Brožek =

Czech rower

Personal information
- Born: 10 December 1896 Bílina, Bohemia, Austria-Hungary
- Died: 22 March 1943 (aged 46) Auschwitz, Nazi Germany

Sport
- Sport: Rowing
- Club: ČAC Roudnice
Medal record
Men's rowing
Representing Czechoslovakia
European Rowing Championships
Bronze medal – third place	1923 Como	Eight

Ferdinand Brožek (10 December 1896 – 22 March 1943) was a Czech rower. He competed for Czechoslovakia at the 1920 Summer Olympics in Antwerp with the men's eight where they were eliminated in round one.

During the World War II Brožek became a prisoner of Theresienstadt Ghetto. On 27 January 1943 he was transferred to Auschwitz concentration camp, where he was murdered by the Nazis on 22 March 1943.
