= Horace Debenham =

British rower (1903–1993)

Personal information
- Full name: Horace Corner Debenham
- Nationality: British
- Born: 24 September 1903; Presteigne, Wales
- Died: 16 October 1993 (aged 90); Lewes, England

Sport
- Sport: Rowing

Horace Corner Debenham (24 September 1903 – 16 October 1993) was a British rower. He competed in the men's eight event at the 1924 Summer Olympics.
