= Hippolyte Schouppe =

Belgian rower

Personal information
- Born: 9 May 1894
- Died: 31 August 1948 (aged 54)

Sport
- Sport: Rowing
- Club: KRSG, Gent
Medal record
Men's rowing
Representing Belgium
European Rowing Championships
Bronze medal – third place	1926 Lucerne	Eight

Hippolyte Schouppe (9 May 1894 – 31 August 1948) was a Belgian rower. He competed at the 1924 Summer Olympics in Paris with the men's eight where they were eliminated in the round one repechage.
