= René De Landtsheer =

Belgian rower

Personal information
- Full name: Renatus Ludovicus De Landtsheer
- Nationality: Belgian
- Born: 8 March 1901; Ghent
- Died: 27 February 1977 (aged 75)

Sport
- Sport: Rowing

René De Landtsheer (8 March 1901 – 27 February 1977) was a Belgian rower. He competed in the men's eight event at the 1924 Summer Olympics.
