= Cornelis Eecen =

Dutch rower

Personal information
- Full name: Cornelis Pieter Eecen
- Nationality: Dutch
- Born: 17 June 1898; Oudkarspel, Netherlands
- Died: 25 December 1988 (aged 90); Bergen, Netherlands

Sport
- Sport: Rowing

Cornelis Pieter Eecen (17 June 1898 – 25 December 1988) was a Dutch rower. He competed in the men's eight event at the 1924 Summer Olympics.
