= Louis Carlier =

French rower

Personal information
- Nationality: French
- Born: 1902

Sport
- Sport: Rowing

Louis Carlier (born 1902, date of death unknown) was a French rower. He competed in the men's eight event at the 1924 Summer Olympics.
