= André Lancelot =

French rower

Personal information
- Nationality: French
- Born: 21 July 1900 Vaucresson, France
- Died: 7 February 1992 (aged 91)

Sport
- Sport: Rowing

André Lancelot (French: [ɑ̃dʁe lɑ̃slo]; 21 July 1900 – 7 February 1992) was a French rower. He competed in the men's eight event at the 1924 Summer Olympics.
