= Carlos Serantes =

Argentine sailor and rower

Personal information
- Full name: Carlos Serantes Saavedra
- Nationality: Argentine
- Born: 21 December 1905
- Died: 31 March 1950 (aged 44) Buenos Aires

Sport

Sailing career
- Class: 8 Metre
Competition record
Sailing
Representing Argentina
Olympic Games
| 8th | 1928 Amsterdam | 8 Metre |
- Updated on 13 March 2015

Carlos Serantes Saavedra (21 December 1905 – 31 March 1950) was a sailor from Argentina, who represented his country at the 1928 Summer Olympics in Amsterdam, Netherlands. He also competed in the men's eight event at the 1924 Summer Olympics.
