= Harold Morphy =

British rower

Personal information
- Birth name: Harold Lewis Morphy
- Nationality: British
- Born: 6 March 1902; Patras, Greece
- Died: 1 August 1987 (aged 85); Corfu, Greece

Sport
- Country: Great Britain
- Sport: Rowing
- Event: Men's eight
- Club: Thames Rowing Club

Achievements and titles
- Olympic finals: 1924 Summer Olympics in Paris

Harold Lewis Morphy (6 March 1902 – 1 August 1987) was a British rower who competed for Great Britain at the 1924 Summer Olympics.

== Biography ==
Born in Patras, Greece, on 6 March 1902, Morphy was educated at Bedford School. He was placed fourth in the men's eight at the 1924 Paris Olympics. He served in the British Army during the Second World War and died in Patras, Greece in 1987.
