= August Geinger =

Belgian rower

Personal information
- Nationality: Belgian
- Born: 5 July 1899; Ghent, Belgium

Sport
- Sport: Rowing

August Geinger (born 5 July 1899, date of death unknown) was a Belgian rower. He competed in the men's eight event at the 1924 Summer Olympics.
