= Félix Taymans =

Belgian rower

Personal information
- Born: Félix François Taymans; 31 October 1889
- Died: 9 May 1962 (aged 72)

Sport
- Sport: Rowing
- Club: CRB, Bruxelles
Medal record
Men's rowing
Representing Belgium
European Rowing Championships
Silver medal – second place	1920 Mâcon	Eight
Silver medal – second place	1922 Barcelona	Single sculls
Bronze medal – third place	1924 Zürich	Double sculls

Félix François Taymans (31 October 1889 – 9 May 1962) was a Belgian rower. He competed at the 1920 Summer Olympics in Antwerp with the men's eight where they were eliminated in the first round.
