= Alberto Anderson =

Argentine rower

Personal information
- Nationality: Argentine
- Born: 1900

Sport
- Sport: Rowing

Alberto Anderson (born 1900, date of death unknown) was an Argentine rower. He competed in the men's eight event at the 1924 Summer Olympics.
