= Henk Rijnders =

Dutch rower

Hendrik Rijnders
Personal information
- Nationality: Dutch
- Born: 6 May 1904; Ambarawa, Dutch East Indies
- Died: 8 February 1979 (aged 74); San Diego, California, United States

Sport
- Sport: Rowing

Hendrik Rijnders (6 May 1904 – 8 February 1979), best known as Henk but also Henry, was a Dutch rower. He competed in the men's eight event at the 1924 Summer Olympics.
