= Maurice Baudechon =

French rower

Personal information
- Full name: Maurice Jacques Baudechon
- Nationality: French
- Born: 9 July 1890; Châtillon, Hauts-de-Seine
- Died: 25 April 1963 (aged 72)

Sport
- Sport: Rowing

Maurice Jacques Baudechon (9 July 1890 – 25 April 1963) was a French rower. He competed in the men's eight event at the 1924 Summer Olympics.
