= Emil Ordnung =

Czechoslovak rower

Personal information
- Born: Emanuel Ordnung; 2 March 1896 Vysoký Chlumec, Austria-Hungary
- Died: 4 April 1956 (aged 60) Prague, Czechoslovakia

Sport
- Sport: Rowing
- Club: ČAC Roudnice
Medal record
Men's rowing
Representing Czechoslovakia
European Rowing Championships
Bronze medal – third place	1923 Como	Eight
Bronze medal – third place	1924 Zürich	Eight

Emanuel Ordnung (2 March 1896 – 4 April 1956) was a Czechoslovak rower. He competed at the 1920 Summer Olympics in Antwerp with the men's eight where they were eliminated in round one.
