= Francisco Borgonovo =

Argentine rower

Personal information
- Full name: Francisco Alberto Borgonovo
- Born: 11 May 1902; Buenos Aires, Argentina

Sport
- Sport: Rowing

Francisco Alberto Borgonovo (born 11 May 1902, date of death unknown) was an Argentine rower. He competed in the men's eight event at the 1924 Summer Olympics.
