= Michel Fourny =

French rower

Personal information
- Full name: Michel Alexandre Fourny
- Nationality: French
- Born: 1 September 1900; Levallois-Perret, France
- Died: 20 September 1970 (aged 70); Los Angeles, US

Sport
- Sport: Rowing

Michel Fourny (1 September 1900 – 20 September 1970) was a French rower. He competed in the men's eight event at the 1924 Summer Olympics.
