= Peter Dulley =

British rower

Lieutenant Commander Peter Dulley
Personal information
- Full name: Hugh William Macpherson Dulley
- Nationality: British
- Born: 11 July 1903 Wellingborough, England
- Died: 19 December 1941 (aged 38) Hong Kong

Sport
- Sport: Rowing

Hugh William Macpherson Dulley (11 July 1903 – 19 December 1941), known as Peter Dulley, was a British rower. He competed in the men's eight event at the 1924 Summer Olympics. He was killed in World War II.

== Personal life ==
Dulley was the son of Herbert Dulley and was a member of at the Thames Rowing Club and attended Westminster School. He started at Westminster as a King's Scholar in 1917 He moved to Hong Kong where he joined the Royal Hong Kong Yacht Club and became their rowing captain for three years. After leaving school he went into business, living in Valparaiso and then working at Jardine, Mathieson and Co.

== Military service ==
Dulley served as a lieutenant commander in the Hong Kong Royal Naval Volunteer Reserve before the Second World War. In 1941 he was ordered to sail a tugboat from Hong Kong to Aden. He was killed by Japanese mortar fire on 19 December 1941 during the Battle of Hong Kong. Dulley is commemorated at Plymouth Naval Memorial.
