= Lajos Wick =

Hungarian rower

Personal information
- Born: 7 August 1892
- Died: 21 January 1959 (aged 66)

Sport
- Sport: Rowing
- Club: Pannónia Evezős Egylet
Medal record
Men's rowing
Representing Hungary
European Rowing Championships
Silver medal – second place	1921 Amsterdam	Eight
Bronze medal – third place	1922 Barcelona	Eight
Bronze medal – third place	1923 Como	Coxed four
Silver medal – second place	1925 Prague	Coxed four

Lajos Wick (7 August 1892 – 21 January 1959) was a Hungarian rower. He competed at the 1924 Summer Olympics in Paris with the men's coxed four where they were eliminated in the round one repechage. During the 1910s and 1920s, Wick won twelve national titles.
