= Julio Alles =

Argentine rower

Personal information
- Full name: Julio Antolin Alles
- Born: 9 October 1900 Buenos Aires, Argentina
- Died: 1971

Sport
- Sport: Rowing

Julio Antolin Alles (9 October 1900 – 1971) was an Argentine. He used to row at Rowing Club, Tigre, Buenos Aires province, Argentina rower. He competed in the men's eight event at the 1924 Summer Olympics.
