= Howard Kingsbury =

American rower (1904–1991)

Medal record

Men's rowing

Representing the United States

Olympic Games
Gold medal – first place	1924 Paris	Men's eight

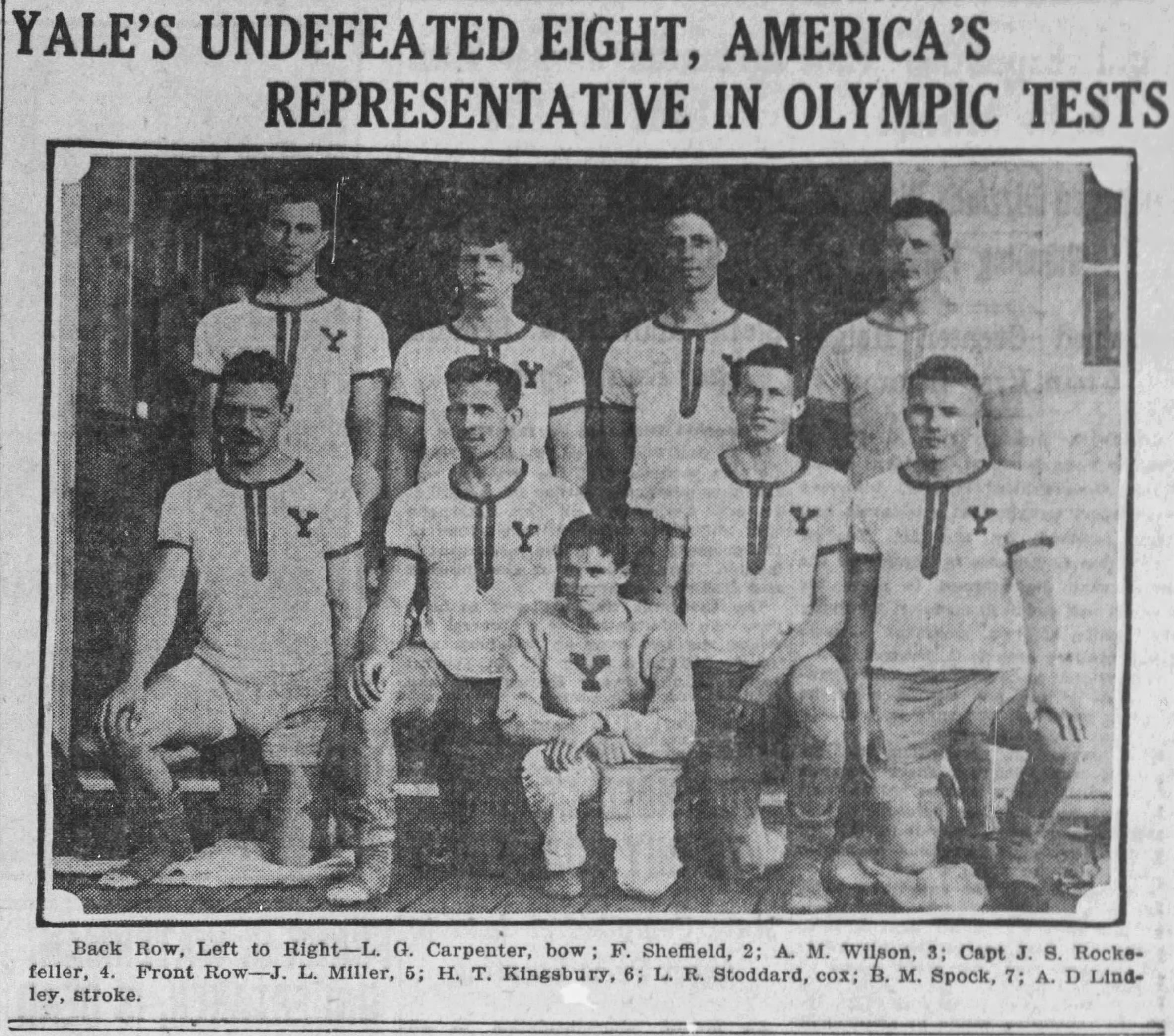
Kingsbury with the Yale Eight

Howard Thayer Kingsbury Jr. (September 11, 1904 – October 27, 1991) was an American rower who competed in the 1924 Summer Olympics in Argenteuil/Paris, France. Known as "Ox", Kingsbury was born in New York City, lived in Manhattan in the Kingsbury house, and prepared at Groton School graduating in 1922. Kingsbury attended Yale University, where he captained the Yale eight rowing team as the six-oar and played football graduating in 1926. He pursued further studies at The Queen's College, Oxford where he rowed with the Oxford crew as the six-oar in the 79th Boat Race against Cambridge in 1927.

In 1924, he was part of the American Eights boat, which won the gold medal. Kingsbury died in Yarmouthport, Massachusetts. He was the father of Nathaniel Wales Kingsbury (October 19, 1940 – November 9, 1998).
