= Leandro Coll =

Spanish rower (1895–1975)

Personal information
- Full name: Leandro Coll Riera
- Nationality: Spanish
- Born: 17 May 1895 Barcelona, Spain
- Died: 2 April 1975 (aged 79) Cosne-Cours-sur-Loire, France

Sport
- Sport: Rowing

Leandro Coll Riera (17 May 1895 – 2 April 1975) was a Spanish rower. He competed in two events at the 1924 Summer Olympics.
