= John Miller (rower) =

American rower (1903–1965)

Medal record

Men's rowing

Representing the United States

Olympic Games
Gold medal – first place	1924 Paris	Men's eight

John Lester Miller (June 5, 1903 in Brooklyn – August 1, 1965) was an American rower who competed in the 1924 Summer Olympics. In 1924, he was part of the American boat, which won the gold medal in the eights.
