= Alf Taeuber =

Australian rower

Alfred Taeuber
Personal information
- Full name: Alfred Charles Taeuber
- Nationality: Australian
- Born: 26 November 1887 Adelaide, South Australia
- Died: 24 February 1961 (aged 73) Murray Bridge, South Australia

Sport
- Sport: Rowing
- Club: Murray Bridge Rowing Club

Alfred Charles Taeuber (26 November 1887 – 24 February 1961) was a South Australian rower. He was a dual Australian champion who represented Australia at the 1924 Summer Olympics in the men's eight rowing crew.

== Club and state rowing ==
Taeuber was employed as a fireman on the South Australian Railways and his senior rowing was from the Murray Bridge Rowing Club. The Murray Bridge Rowing Club men's eight was the dominant Australian club eight of the 1920s. They had won the South Australian state championship from 1920 to 1923 and for the four years from 1920 to 1923 they were selected in-toto as the South Australian men's eight to contest the King's Cup at the Australian Interstate Regatta. Taeuber secured the five seat in the Murray Bridge eight of 1922 and rowed in those South Australian King's Cup victories of 1922 and 1923.

== International representative rowing ==
In 1924 with South Australia continuing to dominate Australian eights rowing, their claim for national Olympic selection could not be denied and after winning a test event raced on Port Adelaide in March 1924, Taeuber and the South Australian crew were selected in-toto to represent Australia as an eight at the 1924 Summer Olympics.

Funding was raised from the Murray Bridge Rowing Club, the South Australian Rowing Association and the general public of South Australia. The crew were nicknamed "the Murray Cods". Unlike the 1912 Olympic eight, the Murray Cods were not invited to race in lead-up at the Henley Royal Regatta and in 2000 Ted Thomas jnr a crew member's son, asserted that this was because the eight was crewed by working class men other than the stroke Bill Sladden It's undisputed that tour funds were scarce and on arrival in France, the crew had to row their shell 60 km to their training base; that on tour some of the crew busked as musicians to raise pocket money; and that on race day they first rowed their shell 26 miles from their boatshed to the Olympic course. Their equipment was also sub-par as they rowed with their oars turning in out-rigged poppets rather than in swivelling gates as had become the norm by 1924.

In the Olympic regatta, with Taeuber in the five seat, the Australian eight finished second behind Italy in their heat, then finished third in the repechage and didn't advance to the final. Taeuber did not row on after the Olympics.
