= José Martínez (rowing) =

Spanish coxswain

Personal information
- Full name: José Martínez Llobet
- Nationality: Spanish
- Born: 1 May 1895; Barcelona, Spain
- Died: 20 March 1971 (aged 75); Barcelona, Spain

Sport
- Sport: Rowing

José Martínez Llobet (1 May 1895 – 20 March 1971) was a Spanish rowing coxswain. He competed in the men's eight event at the 1924 Summer Olympics.
