= Laurence Stoddard =

American coxswain

Medal record

Men's rowing

Representing the United States

Olympic Games
Gold medal – first place	1924 Paris	Eight

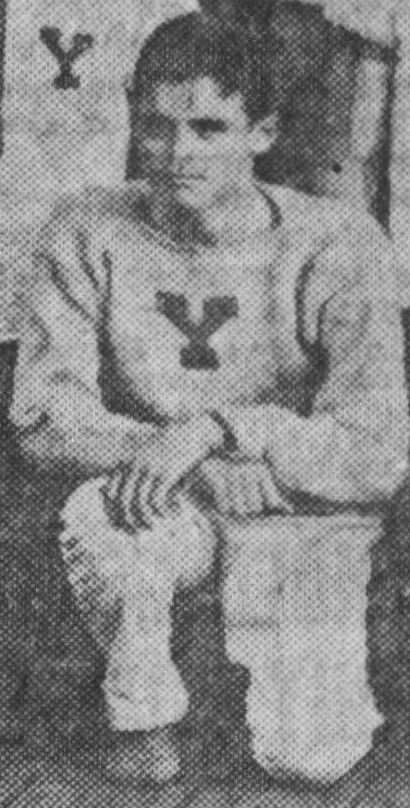
Stoddard in 1924

Laurence Ralph Stoddard (December 22, 1903 – January 26, 1997), also known as Chick Stoddard, was an American rowing coxswain who competed in the 1924 Summer Olympics. In 1924, he coxed the American boat, which won the gold medal in the men's eight.
