= José Lasplazas =

Spanish rower and football manager

Personal information
- Native name: Josep Lluís Lasplazas Pujolar
- Full name: José Luis Lasplazas Pujolar
- Nationality: Spanish
- Born: 18 June 1897 Llers, Spain
- Died: 20 August 1975 (aged 78) Barcelona, Spain
Association football career
- Position: Goalkeeper
Senior career*
Years	Team	Apps	(Gls)
- Universitari SC
Managerial career
- 1959–1960: Spain
- 1959–1960: Spain B
- * Club domestic league appearances and goals

Sport
- Sport: Rowing, football

José Luis Lasplazas Pujolar (18 June 1897 – 20 August 1975) was a Spanish rower, footballer and football manager. He competed in the men's eight event at the 1924 Summer Olympics.
