= Enrique Pérez (rower) =

Spanish rower

Personal information
- Full name: Enrique Pérez Soler
- Nationality: Spanish
- Born: 26 December 1896; Barcelona, Spain
- Died: 1 November 1994 (aged 97); Barcelona, Spain

Sport
- Sport: Rowing

Enrique Pérez Soler (26 December 1896 – 1 November 1994) was a Spanish rower. He competed in the men's eight event at the 1924 Summer Olympics.
