= Alfred Lindley =

American rower

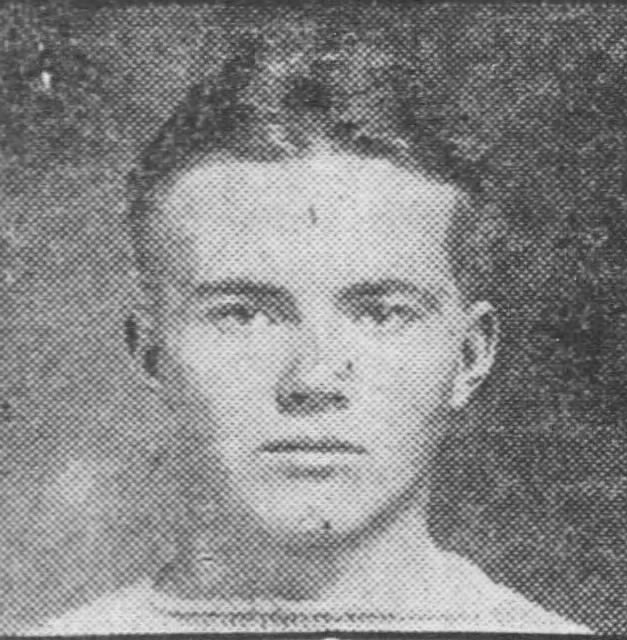
- Lindley in 1924

Medal record

Men's rowing

Representing the United States

Olympic Games
Gold medal – first place	1924 Paris	Men's eight

Alfred Damon Lindley (January 20, 1904 – February 22, 1951) was an American lawyer and sportsman. He participated in a wide variety of sports, including rowing (where he won the gold medal in the eights in the 1924 Summer Olympics), skiing and mountaineering (in which his achievements included the second ascent of Denali). He was also politically active as a supporter of Harold Stassen and a candidate for several offices himself. He died in an airplane crash in 1951.
