= 1923 European Rowing Championships =

- Venue: Lake Como
- Location: Lombardy region, Italy

The 1923 European Rowing Championships were rowing championships held on Lake Como in the Italian Lombardy region. The competition was for men only and they competed in five boat classes (M1x, M2x, M2+, M4+, M8+), the same ones as had been used at the 1920 Summer Olympics in Antwerp.

== Medal summary ==
Event	Gold		Silver		Bronze	
Event	Country & rowers	Time	Country & rowers	Time	Country & rowers	Time
M1x	Switzerland; Rudolf Bosshard		Netherlands; Bert Gunther		Czechoslovakia; Gustav Zinke	
M2x	Switzerland; Rudolf Bosshard; Heini Thoma		Netherlands; Bert Gunther; E. van Toorenburg		Italy; Erminio Dones; Lorenzo Salvini	
M2+	Switzerland; Édouard Candeveau; Alfred Felber; Émile Lachapelle (cox)		Italy; Giovanni Scatturin; Giuseppe Tasson; Gino Sopracordevole (cox)		France; Eugène Constant; Raymond Talleux; Ernest Barberolle (cox)	
M4+	Switzerland; Émile Albrecht; Richard Frey; Alfred Probst; Eugen Sigg; Hans Steiger (cox)		Netherlands; Willy Rösingh; Teun Beijnen; P.M. Duyvis; M.M.C. Posno; M.O. Davis (cox)		Hungary; Lajos Wick; Sándor Hautzinger; Zoltán Török; Károly Muhr; Károly Koch (cox)	
M8+	Italy; Luigi Miller; Carlo Toniatti; Šimun Katalinić; Petar Ivanov; Giuseppe Crivelli; Frane Katalinić; Vittorio Gliubich (cox); Bruno Sorić; Latino Galasso		Switzerland; Hans Schöchlin; Arnold Reymond; Moritz Müller; Karl Schöchlin; Heinrich Hauser; Hans Wendling; Paul Käser; Hans Rüfenacht; Walter Tenger		Czechoslovakia; Emil Ordnung; Viktor Langer; Václav Kautsky; Ferdinand Brožek; Otakar Votík; Karel Knop; Stanislav Bouška; Ivan Schweizer; Josef Jabor (cox)	
