= Alfred Wilson (rower) =

American rower

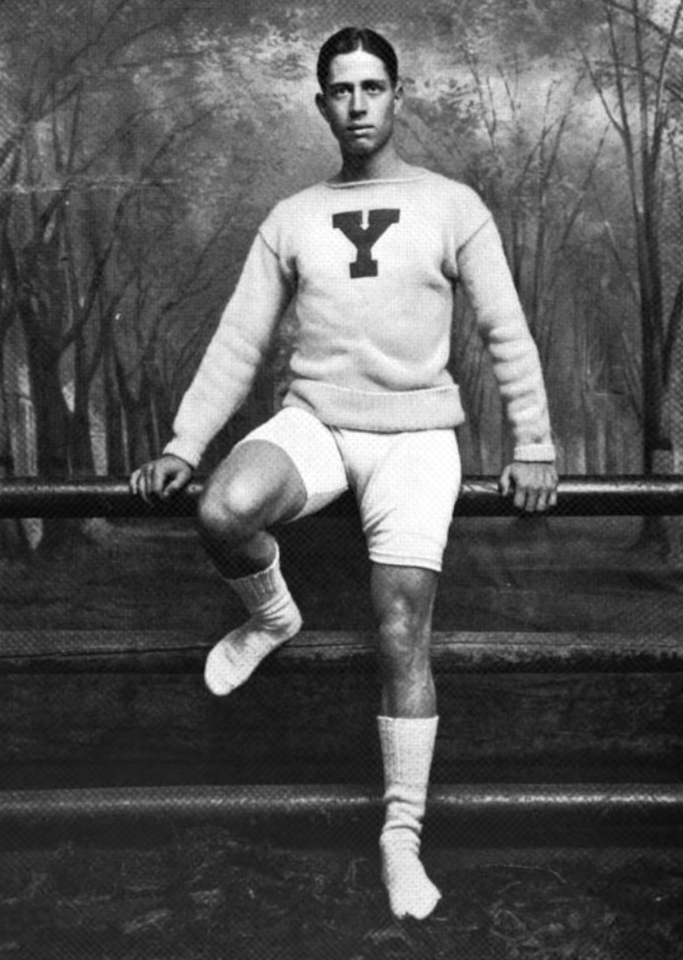
- At Yale in 1925

Medal record

Men's rowing

Representing the United States

Olympic Games
Gold medal – first place	1924 Paris	Men's eight

Alfred Mayo Wilson (December 31, 1903 – October 27, 1989) was an American rower who competed in the 1924 Summer Olympics. In 1924, he was part of the American boat, which won the gold medal in the eights.

He died at Martha's Vineyard Hospital in Massachusetts on October 27, 1989.
