= Enrique Granados (water polo) =

Spanish water polo player (1898–1953)

Personal information
- Nationality: Spanish
- Born: 12 July 1898; Barcelona, Spain
- Died: 29 July 1953 (aged 55); Madrid, Spain

Sport
- Sport: Water polo

Enrique Granados (12 July 1898 – 29 July 1953) was a Spanish water polo player. He competed at the 1920 Summer Olympics and the 1924 Summer Olympics.
