= Leonard Carpenter (rower) =

American rower (1902–1994)

Olympic medal record

Men's rowing

Representing the United States
Gold medal – first place	1924 Paris	Eight

Leonard Griswold Carpenter (July 28, 1902 – May 15, 1994) was an American rower who competed in the 1924 Summer Olympics. In 1924, he was part of the American boat, which won the gold medal in the eights.
