= Walter Jarvis =

Australian rower

Personal information
- Nationality: Australian
- Born: 3 July 1895 Evandale, South Australia
- Died: 18 February 1985 (aged 89) Murray Bridge, South Australia

Sport
- Sport: Rowing
- Club: Murray Bridge Rowing Club

Achievements and titles
- National finals: King's Cup 1920-1923

Walter Edward Howard Jarvis (3 July 1895 – 18 February 1985) was a South Australian rower. He was a three-time national champion who represented Australia at the 1924 Summer Olympics in the men's eight.

== Club and state rowing ==
Jarvis was employed as a foreman and his senior rowing was from the Murray Bridge Rowing Club. The Murray Bridge Rowing Club men's eight was the dominant Australian club eight of the 1920s. They won the South Australian state championship from 1920 to 1923 and in 1921 by a margin of ten lengths. For the four years from 1920 to 1923 they were selected in toto as the South Australian men's eight to contest the King's Cup at the Australian Interstate Regatta. Jarvis rowed in the three seat of each of those crews and rowed in those South Australian King's Cup victories of 1920, 1922 and 1923.

== International representative rowing ==
The South Australian media pushed for Jarvis' victorious 1920 King's Cup eight to be sent to the 1920 Antwerp Olympics but with the Victorian and New South Wales Rowing Association in control of selections and funding, there wasn't sufficient support for their campaign. By 1924 with South Australia continuing to dominate Australian eights rowing, their claim could not be denied and after winning a test event raced on Port Adelaide in March 1924, Jarvis and the South Australian crew were selected in toto to represent Australia as an eight at the 1924 Summer Olympics.

Funding was raised from the Murray Bridge Rowing Club, the South Australian Rowing Association and the general public of South Australia. The crew were nicknamed "the Murray Cods". Unlike the 1912 Olympic eight, the Murray Cods were not invited to race in lead-up at the Henley Royal Regatta and in 2000 Ted Thomas jnr a crew member's son, asserted that this was because the eight was crewed by working-class men other than the stroke Bill Sladden It's undisputed that tour funds were scarce and on arrival in France, the crew had to row their shell 60 km to their training base; that on tour some of the crew busked as musicians to raise pocket money; and that on race day they first rowed their shell 26 miles from their boatshed to the Olympic course. Their equipment was also sub-par as they rowed with their oars turning in out-rigged poppets rather than in swivelling gates as had become the norm by 1924.

In the Olympic regatta, with Jarvis solid in the three seat, the Australian eight finished second behind Italy in their heat, then finished third in the repechage and didn't advance to the final. Jarvis did not row on after the Olympics.
