= Frederick Sheffield =

American rower (1902–1971)

Medal record

Men's rowing

Representing the United States

Olympic Games
Gold medal – first place	1924 Paris	Eight

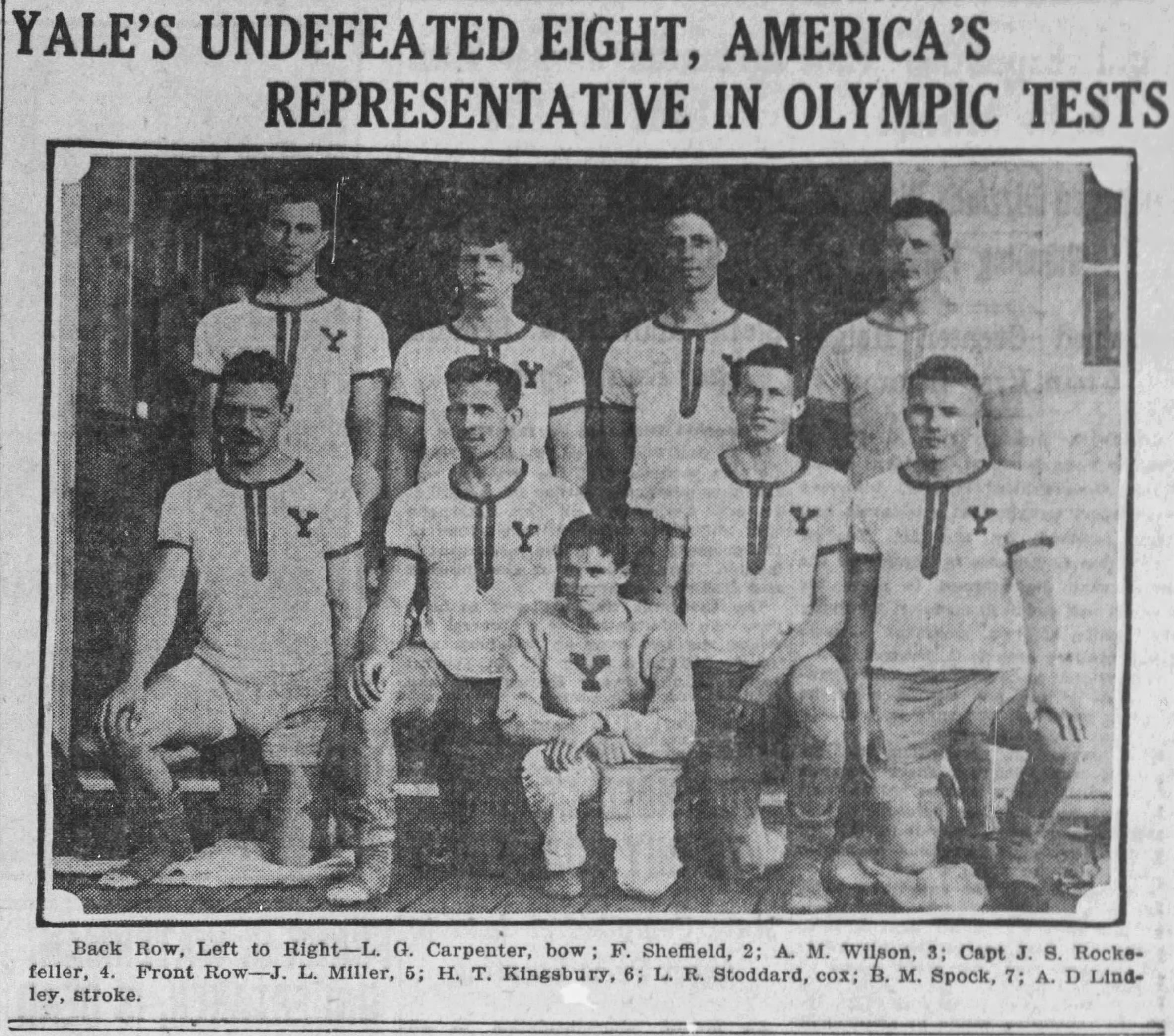
Sheffield with the Yale Eight

Frederick Sheffield (February 26, 1902 – May 8, 1971) was an American rower who competed in the 1924 Summer Olympics in Argenteuil/Paris, France. Sheffield was born in New York City to James Rockwell Sheffield, US Ambassador to Mexico 1924-1927 and Edith Tod. Sheffield prepared at Groton School, graduating in 1920. He attended Yale University where he played freshman football and rowed varsity crew, graduating in 1924.

In 1924, he was part of the American Eights boat, which won the Olympic gold medal. Sheffield graduated from Yale Law School in 1927 and practiced corporate law in New York City. He served as assistant U.S. Commissioner to the 1939-1940 New York World's Fair and as board chairman of the Carnegie Corporation of New York from 1966 until his death. Sheffield died of a heart attack in Wilton, Connecticut (USA).
