= Charles Rew =

British rower

Personal information
- Nationality: British
- Born: 30 September 1898; Brentford, England
- Died: 3 October 1972 (aged 74); L'Ancresse, Guernsey

Sport
- Sport: Rowing

Charles Rew (30 September 1898 – 3 October 1972) was a British rower. He competed in the men's eight event at the 1924 Summer Olympics.
