= Juan Riba =

Spanish rower

Personal information
- Full name: Juan Riba Guixà
- Nationality: Spanish
- Born: 19 January 1900; Barcelona, Spain
- Died: 20 April 1973 (aged 73); Barcelona, Spain

Sport
- Sport: Rowing

Juan Riba Guixà (19 January 1900 – 20 April 1973) was a Spanish rower. He competed in the men's eight event at the 1924 Summer Olympics.
