= Umberto Zadnich =

Italian serial killer (1930-)

- Born: 1930 (age 95–96); Trieste, Italy
- Conviction: Murder x3
- Penalty: Involuntary commitment

Details
- Victims: 3
- Span of crimes: 1974–1987
- Country: Italy
- States: Friuli-Venezia Giulia, Lombardy
- Date apprehended: April 4, 1987

Umberto Zadnich (born 1930) is an Italian serial killer and sex offender who, between 1974 and 1987, killed his common law wife and biological daughter in Trieste, as well as a cellmate at the psychiatric hospital he was housed in. His case led to a successful lawsuit concerning some of the laws in the Basaglia Law, which aimed to close psychiatric hospitals and renew the country's mental treatment facilities.

== Early life and first murders ==
Little is known of Umberto Zadnich's childhood. Born into an ethnic Croat family in Trieste in 1930, he is said to have had a normal upbringing and found a job working at a munitions factory during his early teens. However, in June 1944, the 14-year-old Zadnich's right leg was injured during a grenade attack and he was let off with a pension due to his physical ailment. He soon found a job as a janitor in his home town, and in 1952, he married Benita Maraspin, with whom he would have a daughter, Berta.

In the following years, Zadnich's mental health began to steeply decline, as he also began to regularly sexually abuse his daughter. He was finally caught for this crime in 1966 and sentenced to four years imprisonment, but served only two years before being released. He returned to his wife, who had been too afraid to divorce him, and over the next few years, proceeded to mistreat and isolate her from the outside world. In 1973, during an inspection by some carabinieri, it was discovered that Maraspin was severely malnourished and struggled to make contact. Due to the horrifying circumstances, local authorities pondered charging Zadnich with kidnapping and assault, but no charges were ever brought forward. The following year, he moved in with a common law wife, Lidia Brzan, whom he proceeded to bludgeon to death with a hammer. He fled to Yugoslavia, but was arrested shortly afterwards. Deemed unfit to stand trial, Zadnich was moved to a psychiatric hospital in Castiglione delle Stiviere, where he was ordered to undergo treatment for five years.

On December 13, 1976, under unclear circumstances, Zadnich obtained a brick which he brought to his infirmary room, shared with 31-year-old Gabriele Dobizzi, who had been interned for killing his father. While Dobizzi was asleep, Zadnich grabbed the brick and started violently beating him with it. By the time the nurses arrived and transported him to a hospital in Brescia, Dobizzi had already succumbed to his injuries. For this crime, Zadnich was put under stricter control and his internment extended by a few years.

== Release, relapse and recapture ==
Over the next few years, Zadnich's mental health seemingly improved, leading to his supervising psychiatrist to submit a recommendation that he be allowed to leave the hospital under supervision, but not be deemed "cured" until he had had a full psychiatric evaluation. However, the magistrate went against the decision, and after consulting with other experts, they allowed Zadnich to go free in January 1984, under the conditions that he occasionally return to his local clinic for his prescribed medicine and Valium. He returned to live with his wife in a small apartment in Trieste, and would seemingly live a normal life, buying a sports car and gambling at his local casino. Unbeknownst to outsiders, he continued to rape his now 36-year-old daughter Berta, who worked as a saleswoman, had a son and was living with her second husband, dock worker Dario Braz.

On March 15, 1987, Berta went to visit her parents, with all three of them going at a bar that same evening. When they returned home, Benita went to the bathroom, but in the meantime, Zadnich began to demand sex from his daughter again. Berta resisted his advances, causing him to go berserk and grab a nearby kitchen knife and an axe, threatening her. She continued to resist, prompting him to forcefully undress her until she was almost completely nude, before he proceeded to repeatedly stab her. By the time Zadnich had finished, Berta's body had been stabbed more than 90 times and suffered severe mutilation from the inflicted injuries. He then calmly left the room and disappeared into the night, while Benita eventually left the bathroom and went into shock upon seeing her daughter's body, kneeling and weeping all night. The grizzly crime scene went undiscovered until the next day, when Braz's husband and 9-year-old son Alan drove to the apartment in an attempt to locate her. The carabinieri were called in to interrogate Benita, who was unable to provide much detail, as the combined shock and her own mental illness prevented her from doing so. Nevertheless, Zadnich was quickly declared the prime suspect, and authorities were mobilized across Italy and the neighboring countries in an attempt to catch him.

Twenty days after an arrest warrant was issued for his arrest, Zadnich voluntarily surrendered himself to the authorities in Venice on April 4. He was again deemed mentally unfit to stand trial and removed to a psychiatric hospital in Reggio Emilia, with the recommendation that he be committed until the end of his natural life. Since then, no credible source has been found regarding his status, or whether he is still alive.

== Lawsuit ==
The year after Zadnich's last murder, Franco Bruno, a lawyer representing Berta's son Alan, brought a lawsuit against the Italian health services, demanding that his client be paid 200 million lire in compensation over the state's failure to conduct proper examination procedures on Zadnich, resulting in his mother's death. After a year-long trial, the Supreme Court of Cassation did not rule in favor of the plaintiff. The amount due has not been assigned.

== See also ==
- List of serial killers by country
