= Léon Lippens (rower) =

Belgian rower

Personal information
- Nationality: Belgian
- Born: 3 April 1903
- Died: 7 August 1967 (aged 64)

Sport
- Sport: Rowing

Léon Lippens (3 April 1903 – 7 August 1967) was a Belgian rower. He competed in the men's eight event at the 1924 Summer Olympics.
