= Alexander Long (rower) =

British rower

Personal information
- Full name: Alexander Frederick Long
- Nationality: British
- Born: 18 March 1900
- Died: 31 December 1975 (aged 75)

Sport
- Sport: Rowing

Alexander Long (18 March 1900 – 31 December 1975) was a British rower. He competed in the men's eight event at the 1924 Summer Olympics.
