= Armando Trabucco =

Argentine rower

Personal information
- Nationality: Argentine
- Born: 3 May 1902
- Died: 7 April 1984 (aged 81)

Sport
- Sport: Rowing

Armando Trabucco (3 May 1902 – 7 April 1984) was an Argentine rower. He competed in the men's eight event at the 1924 Summer Olympics.
