= Luis Omedes =

Spanish rower

Personal information
- Full name: Luis Omedes Sistachs
- Nationality: Spanish
- Born: 24 August 1897; Barcelona, Spain
- Died: 8 January 1970 (aged 72); Barcelona, Spain

Sport
- Sport: Rowing

Luis Omedes Sistachs (24 August 1897 – 8 January 1970) was a Spanish rower. He competed in two events at the 1924 Summer Olympics.
