= Ricardo Massana =

Spanish rower

Personal information
- Full name: Ricardo Massana Cullell
- Nationality: Spanish
- Born: 31 July 1898; Barcelona, Spain
- Died: 28 August 1988 (aged 90); Barcelona, Spain

Sport
- Sport: Rowing

Ricardo Massana Cullell (31 July 1898 – 28 August 1988) was a Spanish rower. He competed in two events at the 1924 Summer Olympics.
