= Jean van Silfhout (rower) =

Belgian coxswain

Personal information
- Born: 2 May 1899 Sint-Amandsberg
- Died: 29 January 1942 (aged 42) Ghent

Sport
- Sport: Rowing
- Club: Royal Club Nautique de Gand
Medal record
Men's rowing
Representing Belgium
European Rowing Championships
Silver medal – second place	1920 Mâcon	Coxed four
Bronze medal – third place	1921 Amsterdam	Eight

Jean van Silfhout (2 May 1899 – 29 January 1942) was a Belgian rower. He competed at the 1920 Summer Olympics in Antwerp with the men's coxed four, where they were eliminated in round one. At the 1924 Olympics, he competed in the eight event; in this regatta, the team was eliminated in the round one repêchage.
