= Ivor Campbell =

Canadian rower (1898–1971)

Olympic medal record

Men's rowing
Silver medal – second place	1924 Paris	Eight

Ivor Campbell (January 11, 1898, Kirkintilloch, Scotland – September 1, 1971, Portland, Oregon) was a Canadian rowing coxswain who competed in the 1924 Summer Olympics where he won the silver medal as part of the Canadian boat in the men's eight event.

His family, native of Scotland, had moved him from his birthplace to Toronto, Canada, at the age of 12. In Toronto, he was educated, obtaining his doctorate in medicine in 1926. In college, he won applaud for his skills in rowing, being on the Canadian Olympic Team in 1924.

In the Second World War, he served first as a psychiatrist with the Royal Canadian Air Force and, when the United States entered the war, he transferred to the United States Army Air Force, finishing as a flight surgeon with a rank of colonel. In his years in service during the Second World War, he was awarded the Croix de Guerre by the French government for his superior help in establishing medical facilities and services to poverty-ridden people in liberated French territory.
