= Robert Hunter (rower) =

Canadian rower

Olympic medal record

Men's rowing
| Silver medal – second place | 1924 Paris | Eight |

Robert Sinclair Hunter (27 March 1904 – 25 March 1950) was a Canadian rower who competed in the 1924 Summer Olympics. In 1924 he won the silver medal as crew member of the Canadian boat in the eights event.
