= John Smith (Canadian rower) =

Canadian rower

Olympic medal record

Men's rowing
Silver medal – second place	1924 Paris	Eight

John David Smith (March 3, 1899 – September 29, 1973) was a Canadian rower who competed in the 1924 Summer Olympics. In 1924, he won the silver medal as a crew member of the Canadian boat in the eights event. He died in the Toronto suburb of Scarborough, Ontario in 1973.
