= Archibald Black =

Canadian rower

Personal information
- Born: May 17, 1883 Winnipeg, Manitoba, Canada
- Died: May 14, 1956 (aged 72) Vancouver, British Columbia, Canada
Medal record
Men's rowing
Representing Canada
Silver medal – second place	1924 Paris	Coxless four

Archibald "Archie" C. Black (May 17, 1883 in – May 14, 1956) was a Canadian rower who competed in the 1924 Summer Olympics. He was born in Winnipeg and died in Vancouver. In 1924 he won the silver medal as crew member of the Canadian boat in the coxless fours event.
