= Norman Taylor (rower) =

Canadian rower

Olympic medal record

Men's rowing
Silver medal – second place	1924 Paris	Eight

Norman William Taylor (April 15, 1899 – December 14, 1980) was a Canadian rower who competed in the 1924 Summer Olympics. He won a silver medal at the Paris Games as crew member of the Canadian boat in the eights event.
