= Warren Snyder =

Canadian rower

Olympic medal record

Men's rowing
Silver medal – second place	1924 Paris	Eight

Dr. Warren Bertram Snyder (2 March 1903 in Toronto, Ontario – 27 March 1957) was a Canadian athlete and doctor. Snyder competed for Canada in Rowing in the 1924 Summer Olympics. Snyder won the silver medal as crew member of the Canadian boat in the eights event.
