= Harold Little =

Canadian rower

Olympic medal record

Men's rowing
Silver medal – second place	1924 Paris	Eight

Harold Boyd Little (27 July 1893 – 1958) was a Canadian rower who competed in the 1924 Summer Olympics. In 1924 he won the silver medal as crew member of the Canadian boat in the eights event.
