= Arthur Bell (rower) =

Canadian rower

Olympic medal record

Men's rowing

Representing Canada
Silver medal – second place	1924 Paris	Eight

Arthur Armstrong Bell (20 February 1899 in Toronto, Ontario – 23 February 1963) was a Canadian rower who competed in the 1924 Summer Olympics. In 1924 he won the silver medal as crew member of the Canadian boat in the eights event.
