= William Wallace (rower) =

Canadian rower

Olympic medal record

Men's rowing
Silver medal – second place	1924 Paris	Eight

William Lawrence "Laurie" Wallace (12 April 1901 in Toronto, Ontario – 20 July 1967) was a Canadian rower who competed in the 1924 Summer Olympics. In 1924 he won the silver medal as crew member of the Canadian boat in the eights event.
