= Eliseo Morales (rower) =

Spanisch rower

Personal information
- Full name: Eliseo Morales Walter
- Nationality: Spanish
- Born: 23 April 1898; Yecla, Spain
- Died: 5 January 1993 (aged 94); Barcelona, Spain

Sport
- Sport: Rowing

Eliseo Morales Walter (23 April 1898 – 5 January 1993) was a Spanish rower. He competed in the men's eight event at the 1924 Summer Olympics.
