= William Langford (rower) =

Canadian rower

Olympic medal record

Men's rowing
Silver medal – second place	1924 Paris	Eight

William Frederick Langford (7 August 1896 in Gravenhurst, Ontario – 21 January 1973) was a Canadian rower who competed in the 1924 Summer Olympics. In 1924 he won the silver medal as crew member of the Canadian boat in the eights event.
