= Bruno Sorić =

Croatian rower

Personal information
- Full name: Bruno Ivo Lovre Sorich (Šorić-)
- Born: 16 May 1904 Zadar, Kingdom of Dalmatia, Austria-Hungary
- Died: 7 June 1942 (aged 38) Kistanje, Independent State of Croatia

Sport
- Sport: Rowing
- Club: Diadora, Zadar
Medal record
Men's rowing
Representing Italy
Olympic Games
Bronze medal – third place	1924 Paris	Eight
European Rowing Championships
Silver medal – second place	1922 Barcelona	Eight
Gold medal – first place	1923 Como	Eight

Bruno Sorić (Italian: Bruno Sorich; 16 May 1904 – 7 June 1942), was a Croatian rower who competed for Italy in the 1924 Summer Olympics. In 1924 he won the bronze medal as crew member of the Italian boat in the men's eight competition. He was killed in action during World War II.
