= Petar Ivanov (rower) =

Croatian-Italian rower (1894–1961)

Personal information
- Nationality: Croatian
- Born: 30 August 1894 Zadar, Kingdom of Dalmatia, Austria-Hungary
- Died: 22 March 1961 (aged 66)

Sport
- Sport: Rowing
- Club: Diadora, Zadar
Medal record
Men's rowing
Representing Italy
Olympic Games
| Bronze medal – third place | 1924 Paris | Eight |
European Rowing Championships
| Gold medal – first place | 1923 Como | Eight |

Petar Ivanov (Italianized: Pietro Ivanov); 30 August 1894 – 22 March 1961) was a Croatian rower who competed for Italy in the 1924 Summer Olympics. In 1924, he won the bronze medal as crew member of the Italian boat in the men's eight competition. After his competitive career, he was the head rowing coach for VK Krka Šibenik. He died in 1961.
