= Vittorio Gliubich =

Italian rower (1902–1984)

Personal information
- Born: 18 April 1902 Zadar, Kingdom of Dalmatia, Austria-Hungary
- Died: 20 May 1984 (aged 82)

Sport
- Sport: Rowing
- Club: Circolo Canottieri Diadora, Zadar
Medal record
Men's rowing
Representing Italy
Olympic Games
Bronze medal – third place	1924 Paris	Eight
European Rowing Championships
Gold medal – first place	1923 Como	Eight

Vittorio Gliubich (18 April 1902 – 20 May 1984) was an Italian rowing coxswain who competed for Italy at the 1924 Summer Olympics. He was born in Zadar, then in Austria-Hungary. In 1924, he won the bronze medal as cox of the Italian boat in the men's eight competition.
