= Giuseppe Crivelli =

Italian rower

Personal information
- Born: 18 October 1900 Milan, Italy
- Died: 2 June 1950 (aged 49)
- Height: 172 cm (5 ft 8 in)
- Weight: 71 kg (157 lb)

Sport
- Sport: Rowing
- Club: Diadora, Zadar
Medal record
Men's rowing
Representing Italy
Olympic Games
Bronze medal – third place	1924 Paris	Eight
European Rowing Championships
Gold medal – first place	1923 Como	Eight

Giuseppe Crivelli (18 October 1900 – 2 June 1950) was an Italian rower who competed in the 1924 Summer Olympics. Crivelli was born in Milan. In 1924 he won the bronze medal as crew member of the Italian boat in the men's eight competition.
