= Latino Galasso =

Dalmatian Italian rower

Personal information
- Born: 25 August 1898 Zadar, Kingdom of Dalmatia, Austria-Hungary
- Died: 29 July 1949 (aged 50) Rovereto, Italy

Sport
- Sport: Rowing
- Club: Diadora, Zadar
Medal record
Men's rowing
Representing Italy
Olympic Games
Bronze medal – third place	1924 Paris	Eight
European Rowing Championships
Silver medal – second place	1922 Barcelona	Eight
Gold medal – first place	1923 Como	Eight

Latino Galasso (25 August 1898 – 29 July 1949) was a Dalmatian Italian rower who competed in the 1924 Summer Olympics. In 1924 he won the bronze medal as crew member of the Italian boat in the men's eight competition.
