= Carlo Toniatti =

Dalmatian Italian rower

Personal information
- Born: 11 January 1892 Zadar, Austria-Hungary
- Died: 1968

Sport
- Sport: Rowing
- Club: Diadora, Zadar
Medal record
Men's rowing
Representing Italy
Olympic Games
Bronze medal – third place	1924 Paris	Eight
European Rowing Championships
Silver medal – second place	1922 Barcelona	Eight
Gold medal – first place	1923 Como	Eight

Carlo Toniatti (11 January 1892 – 1968) was a Dalmatian Italian rower who competed in the 1924 Summer Olympics. He was born in Zadar, then in Austria-Hungary. In 1924 he won the bronze medal as crew member of the Italian boat in the men's eight competition.
