= William Sladden =

Australian rower

Personal information
- Full name: William Melville Sladden
- Nationality: Australian
- Born: 13 November 1882 Nairne, South Australia
- Died: 12 November 1961 (aged 78) Murray Bridge, South Australia
- Height: 170 cm (5 ft 7 in)
- Weight: 63 kg (139 lb)

Sport
- Sport: Rowing
- Club: Murray Bridge Rowing Club

Achievements and titles
- National finals: King's Cup 1920-23

William Melville Sladden (13 November 1882 – 12 November 1961) was a South Australian rower. He was a four-time national champion who represented Australia at the 1924 Summer Olympics in the stroke seat of the men's eight.

== Pre war rowing ==
Sladden's senior rowing was from the Murray Bridge Rowing Club. He (and the rest of the champion Murray Bridge senior men's eight) was selected in South Australian state eights to contest the Australian men's interstate eights title at the Interstate Regattas of 1913 and 1914. They won the national title in 1913 and placed second in 1914.

== Post war rowing ==
Sladden's occupation post war was listed as "Master Mariner" and he returned to competition at the Murray Bridge Rowing Club. The Murray Bridge Rowing Club men's eight continued as the dominant Australian club eight of the 1920s. They won the South Australian state championship from 1920 to 1923 and in 1921 by a margin of ten lengths. For the four years from 1920 to 1923 they were selected in-toto as the South Australian men's eight to contest the King's Cup at the Australian Interstate Regatta. Sladden was the in each of those crews (at stroke in 1920) and rowed in those South Australian King's Cup victories of 1920, 1922 and 1923.

The South Australian media pushed for Sladden's victorious 1920 King's Cup eight to be sent to the 1920 Antwerp Olympics but with the Victorian and New South Wales Rowing Association in control of selections and funding, there wasn't sufficient support for their campaign. By 1924 with South Australia continuing to dominate Australian eights rowing, their claim could not be denied and after winning a test event raced on Port Adelaide in March 1924, Sladden and the South Australian crew were selected in-toto to represent Australia as an eight at the 1924 Summer Olympics.

Funding was raised from the Murray Bridge Rowing Club, the South Australian Rowing Association and the general public of South Australia. The crew were nicknamed "the Murray Cods". Unlike the 1912 Olympic eight, the Murray Cods were not invited to race in lead-up at the Henley Royal Regatta and in 2000 Ted Thomas jnr a crew member's son, asserted that this was because the eight was crewed by working-class men other than Sladden It's undisputed that tour funds were scarce and on arrival in France, the crew had to row their shell 60 km to their training base; that on tour a number of the crew (including Sladden) busked as musicians to raise pocket money; and that on race day they first rowed their shell 26 miles from their boatshed to the Olympic course. Their equipment was also sub-par as they rowed with their oars turning in out-rigged poppets rather than in swivelling gates as had become the norm by 1924.

In the Olympic regatta, with Sladden at stroke, the Australian eight finished second behind Italy in their heat, then finished third in the repechage and didn't advance to the final. Sladden did not row on after the Olympics.
