= Great Britain at the 1924 Summer Olympics =

- Flag of the United Kingdom
- IOC code: GBR
- NOC: British Olympic Association

in Paris
- Competitors: 267 (239 men and 28 women) in 18 sports
- Flag bearer: Arthur Hunt
- Medals Ranked 4th: Gold 9 Silver 13 Bronze 12 Total 34

Summer Olympics appearances (overview)
- 1896; 1900; 1904; 1908; 1912; 1920; 1924; 1928; 1932; 1936; 1948; 1952; 1956; 1960; 1964; 1968; 1972; 1976; 1980; 1984; 1988; 1992; 1996; 2000; 2004; 2008; 2012; 2016; 2020; 2024; 2028

Other related appearances
- 1906 Intercalated Games

Great Britain, represented by the British Olympic Association (BOA), competed at the 1924 Summer Olympics in Paris, France. This was the first Summer Olympics in which athletes from the newly independent Irish Free State competed separately. Following the Royal and Parliamentary Titles Act 1927, the name changed (officially) to 'United Kingdom of Great Britain and Northern Ireland' but the Olympic team competed as Great Britain from the 1928 games onwards. 267 competitors, 239 men and 28 women, took part in 115 events in 18 sports.

== Medallists ==
Medal	Name	Sport	Event	Date
Gold	Harold Abrahams	Athletics	Men's 100 m	July 7
Gold	Eric Liddell	Athletics	Men's 400 m	July 11
Gold	Douglas Lowe	Athletics	Men's 800 m	July 7
Gold	Harry Mallin	Boxing	Men's middleweight	July 20
Gold	Harry Mitchell	Boxing	Men's light heavyweight	July 20
Gold	Jack Beresford	Rowing	Men's single sculls	July 17
Gold	Charles Eley, James MacNabb, Robert Morrison, Terence Sanders	Rowing	Men's coxless four	July 17
Gold	Cyril Mackworth-Praed, Philip Neame, Herbert Perry, Allen Whitty	Shooting	Men's 100 m team running deer, double shots	July 3
Gold	Lucy Morton	Swimming	Women's 200 m breaststroke	July 18
Silver	Harold Abrahams, Wilfred Nichol, Walter Rangeley, Lancelot Royle	Athletics	Men's 4 × 100 m relay	July 13
Silver	Herbert Johnston, Bertram Macdonald, George Webber	Athletics	Men's 3000 m team race	July 13
Silver	Gordon Goodwin	Athletics	Men's 10 km walk	July 13
Silver	James McKenzie	Boxing	Men's flyweight	July 20
Silver	John Elliott	Boxing	Men's middleweight	July 20
Silver	Cyril Alden	Cycling	Men's 50 km	July 27
Silver	Gladys Davis	Fencing	Women's foil	July 4
Silver	Harold Fowler, Edwin Jacob, Thomas Riggs, Walter Riggs, Ernest Roney	Sailing	8 m Class	July 26
Silver	Cyril Mackworth-Praed	Shooting	Men's 100 m running deer, single shots	June 30
Silver	Cyril Mackworth-Praed	Shooting	Men's 100 m running deer, double shots	July 1
Silver	Phyllis Harding	Swimming	Women's 100 m backstroke	July 20
Silver	Florence Barker, Constance Jeans, Grace McKenzie, Iris Tanner	Swimming	Women's 4 × 100 m freestyle relay	July 18
Silver	Phyllis Covell, Kathleen McKane Godfree	Tennis	Women's doubles	July 19
Bronze	Eric Liddell	Athletics	Men's 200 m	July 9
Bronze	Guy Butler	Athletics	Men's 400 m	July 11
Bronze	H. B. Stallard	Athletics	Men's 1500 m	July 10
Bronze	Guy Butler, George Renwick, Richard Ripley, Edward Toms	Athletics	Men's 4 × 400 m relay	July 13
Bronze	Malcolm Nokes	Athletics	Men's hammer throw	July 10
Bronze	Harry Wyld	Cycling	Men's 50 km	July 27
Bronze	Harold Clarke	Diving	Men's plain high diving	July 15
Bronze	Great Britain national polo team: Frederick W. Barrett; Dennis Bingham; Frederick Guest; Percival Kinnear Wise	Polo		July 12
Bronze	Gladys Carson	Swimming	Women's 200 m breaststroke	July 18
Bronze	Kathleen McKane Godfree	Tennis	Women's singles	July 20
Bronze	Evelyn Colyer, Dorothy Shepherd-Barron	Tennis	Women's doubles	July 19
Bronze	Archie MacDonald	Wrestling	Men's freestyle heavyweight	July 14

== Athletics ==
Sixty-five athletes represented Great Britain in 1924. It was the nation's seventh appearance in the sport; Great Britain was one of three nations, along with Greece and the United States, to have competed in each edition of the Olympic athletics competitions. With three gold medals and eleven total medals, the British athletes finished third in both counts behind the Americans and the Finns. Harold Abrahams and Eric Liddell, two of the British Olympic champions in the sport, would later be the subjects of the film Chariots of Fire for their competition in Paris.

Liddell won the 400 metres, breaking the world record in the final. Abrahams took the gold medal in the 100 metres, matching the Olympic record in three of the four rounds. Lowe took the third championship for Great Britain, in the 800 metres. The 4 × 100 metre relay team, including Abrahams, briefly took the world record, though relinquished it to the American team which beat the British squad in the final.

Ranks given are within the heat.

Athlete	Event	Heats		Quarterfinals		Semifinals		Final	
Athlete	Event	Result	Rank	Result	Rank	Result	Rank	Result	Rank
Harold Abrahams	100 m	11.0	1 Q	10.6 =OR	1 Q	10.6 =OR	1 Q	10.6 =OR	1st place, gold medalist(s)
Harold Abrahams	200 m	22.2	1 Q	22.0	1 Q	21.9	3 Q	22.3	6
Charles Beckwith	Shot put	N/A				12.48	7	did not advance	
John Benham	Cross country	N/A						did not finish	
Frederick Blackett	400 m hurdles	N/A		56.9	2 Q	58.4	3 Q	Disqualified	
Halland Britton	10000 m	N/A						32:06.0	6
David Burghley	110 m hurdles	N/A		Unknown	3	did not advance			
Guy Butler	400 m	50.2	1 Q	49.8	1 Q	47.9	2 Q	48.6	3rd place, bronze medalist(s)
James Campbell	Pole vault	N/A				3.20	7	did not advance	
Ernest Clark	10 km walk	N/A				Unknown	5 Q	49:59.2	6
Charles Clibbon	5000 m	N/A				15:35.6	4 Q	15:29.0	6
Charles Clibbon	10000 m	N/A						Unknown	14
David Cummings	3000 m steeplechase	N/A				Unknown	5	did not advance	
Jock Dalrymple	Javelin throw	N/A				46.92	12	did not advance	
Henri Dauban de Silhouette	Javelin throw	N/A				44.70	13	did not advance	
Robert Dickinson	High jump	N/A				1.75	5	did not advance	
Cyril Ellis	1500 m	N/A				4:08.1	3	did not advance	
Arthur Farrimond	Marathon	N/A						3:05:15.0	17
Samuel Ferris	Marathon	N/A						2:52:26.0	5
Fred Gaby	110 m hurdles	N/A		15.6	1 Q	15.7	3	did not advance	
Gordon Goodwin	10 km walk	N/A				49:04.0	1 Q	48:37.9	2nd place, silver medalist(s)
Ernie Harper	10000 m	N/A						31:58.0	5
Ernie Harper	Cross country	N/A						35:45.4	4
Eric Harrison	110 m hurdles	N/A		Unknown	2 Q	15.7	4	did not advance	
Jack Higginson	Triple jump	N/A				13.34	7	did not advance	
Harry Houghton	800 m	N/A		1:58.4	2 Q	1:57.3	2 Q	1:58.0	9
Charles Johnstone	5000 m	N/A				15:27.4	5	did not advance	
Crawford Kerr	High jump	N/A				No mark	5	did not advance	
Harold Langley	Triple jump	N/A				12.74	8	did not advance	
Ernest Letherland	Marathon	N/A						did not finish	
Eric Liddell	200 m	22.2	1 Q	Unknown	2 Q	21.8	2 Q	21.9	3rd place, bronze medalist(s)
Eric Liddell	400 m	50.2	1 Q	49.3	2 Q	48.2	1 Q	47.6 WR	1st place, gold medalist(s)
Douglas Lowe	800 m	N/A		1:58.0	1 Q	1:56.8	1 Q	1:52.4	1st place, gold medalist(s)
Douglas Lowe	1500 m	N/A				4:07.2	2 Q	3:57.0	4
Christopher MacKintosh	Long jump	N/A				6.88	3 Q	6.92	6
Thomas Matthewman	200 m	Unknown	2 Q	Unknown	4	did not advance			
Jack McKenna	Marathon	N/A						3:30:40.0	27
Albert Mills	Marathon	N/A						did not finish	
Evelyn Montague	3000 m steeplechase	N/A				9:48.0	3 Q	9:58.0	6
Edgar Mountain	800 m	N/A		Unknown	3 Q	Unknown	7	did not advance	
Sidney Newey	3000 m steeplechase	N/A				Unknown	3 Q	Unknown	9
Wilfred Nichol	100 m	11.0	1 Q	11.0	2 Q	11.3	4	did not advance	
Wilfred Nichol	200 m	22.6	1 Q	22.6	2 Q	22.4	5	did not advance	
Malcolm Nokes	Hammer throw	N/A				48.875	2 Q	48.875	3rd place, bronze medalist(s)
John Odde	Triple jump	N/A				13.40	6	did not advance	
Leopold Partridge	110 m hurdles	N/A		Unknown	3	did not advance			
Walter Rangeley	100 m	11.0	1 Q	11.0	3	did not advance			
George Renwick	400 m	50.3	2 Q	Unknown	6	did not advance			
Lancelot Royle	100 m	11.0	1 Q	Unknown	3	did not advance			
Frank Saunders	5000 m	N/A				15:37.0	4 Q	15:54.0	10
Arthur Sewell	Cross country	N/A						did not finish	
Donald Slack	Pentathlon	N/A						Elim-3	
Donald Slack	Decathlon	N/A						5148.105	25
Percy Spark	Pentathlon	N/A						Elim-3	
Percy Spark	Decathlon	N/A						did not finish	
Sonny Spencer	1500 m	N/A				4:09.0	2 Q	4:03.7	11
H. B. Stallard	800 m	N/A		1:57.6	1 Q	1:54.2	1 Q	1:53.0	4
H. B. Stallard	1500 m	N/A				4:11.8	1 Q	3:55.6	3rd place, bronze medalist(s)
Ralph Starr	5000 m	N/A				Unknown	6	did not advance	
Wilfrid Tatham	400 m hurdles	N/A		58.5	3	did not advance			
Edward Toms	400 m	49.9	2 Q	Unknown	4	did not advance			
Gordon Watts	10 km walk	N/A				Disqualified		did not advance	
Eddie Webster	10000 m	N/A						did not finish	
Eddie Webster	Cross country	N/A						did not finish	
Joseph Williams	Cross country	N/A						did not finish	
Arthur Willis	High jump	N/A				No mark	3	did not advance	
Rex Woods	Shot put	N/A				11.77	7	did not advance	
Dunky Wright	Marathon	N/A						did not finish	
Harold Abrahams; Wilfred Nichol; Walter Rangeley; Lancelot Royle	4 × 100 m relay	N/A		42.0 WR	1 Q	41.8	1 Q	42.5	2nd place, silver medalist(s)
Guy Butler; George Renwick; Richard Ripley; Edward Toms	4 × 400 m relay	N/A				3:22.0	1 Q	3:17.4	3rd place, bronze medalist(s)
John Benham; Ernie Harper; Arthur Sewell; Eddie Webster; Joseph Williams	Team cross country	N/A						did not finish	
Arthur Clark; Herbert Johnston; Bertram Macdonald; Walter Porter; William Seagrove; George Webber	3000 m team	N/A				15	2 Q	14	2nd place, silver medalist(s)

== Boxing ==
Sixteen boxers represented Great Britain at the 1924 Games; Great Britain was one of four nations to have two wrestlers in each weight class (along with France, Italy, and the United States). It was the nation's third appearance in the sport. Great Britain matched the United States for most gold medals, at two, and most silver medals, also at two; those were all the medals won by the British team, however, while the United States also took a pair of bronzes to take the top medal spot with six to Great Britain's four. Mallin's middleweight championship came after a quarterfinal win by disqualification (Brousse bit Mallin) and a bout against countryman Elliott in the final. Mitchell took the light heavyweight crown without being bitten.

Boxer	Weight class	Round of 32	Round of 16	Quarterfinals	Semifinals	Final / Bronze match	
Boxer	Weight class	Opposition Score	Opposition Score	Opposition Score	Opposition Score	Opposition Score	Rank
Alf Barber	Bantamweight	Bye	Smit (NED); W	Ces (FRA); L	did not advance		5
James Basham	Welterweight	Dwyer (IRL); L	did not advance				17
Arthur Beavis	Featherweight	Flammang (LUX); W	Quartucci (ARG); L	did not advance			9
Arthur Clifton	Heavyweight	N/A	Eagan (USA); W	Petersen (DEN); L	did not advance		5
John Courtis	Light heavyweight	Bye	Maurer (LUX); W	Saraudi (ITA); L	did not advance		5
Harry Dingley	Featherweight	Bye	Tuns (BEL); W	Devergnies (BEL); L	did not advance		5
John Elliott	Middleweight	Bye	Givel (SUI); W	Henning (CAN); W	Black (CAN); W	Mallin (GBR); L	2nd place, silver medalist(s)
Harry Mallin	Middleweight	Stokstad (NOR); W	Siebert (SUI); W	Brousse (FRA); W	Beecken (BEL); W	Elliott (GBR); W	1st place, gold medalist(s)
James McKenzie	Flyweight	Bye	Turksma (NED); W	MacGregor (CAN); W	Fee (USA); W	LaBarba (USA); L	2nd place, silver medalist(s)
Harry Mitchell	Light heavyweight	Miljon (NED); W	Fouquet (FRA); W	Rossignon (FRA); W	Saraudi (ITA); W	Petersen (DEN); W	1st place, gold medalist(s)
Patrick O'Hanrahan	Welterweight	Dubois (FRA); W	Delarge (BEL); L	did not advance			9
Cornelis O'Kelly	Heavyweight	N/A	Bertazzolo (ITA); L	did not advance			9
George Shorter	Lightweight	Bye	Boylstein (USA); L	did not advance			9
Les Tarrant	Bantamweight	Bye	Tripoli (USA); L	did not advance			9
Ernest Warwick	Flyweight	LaBarba (USA); L	did not advance				17
William White	Lightweight	Copello (ARG); L	did not advance				17

Opponent nation	Wins	Losses	Percent
Argentina	0	2	.000
Belgium	2	2	.500
Canada	3	0	1.000
Denmark	1	1	.500
France	4	1	.800
Ireland	0	1	.000
Italy	1	2	.333
Luxembourg	2	0	1.000
Netherlands	3	0	1.000
Norway	1	0	1.000
Switzerland	2	0	1.000
United States	2	4	.333
Total international	21	13	.618
Great Britain	1	1	.500
Total	22	14	.611

Round	Wins	Losses	Percent
Round of 32	4	3	.571
Round of 16	8	5	.615
Quarterfinals	4	4	.500
Semifinals	4	0	1.000
Final	2	2	.500
Bronze match	0	0	–
Total	22	14	.611

== Cycling ==
Twelve cyclists represented Great Britain in 1924, the most of any nation. It was the nation's fifth appearance in the sport. The British cyclists took two medals—the silver and bronze in the 50 kilometres.

=== Road cycling ===
Ranks given are within the heat.

Cyclist	Event	Final	
Cyclist	Event	Result	Rank
Samuel Hunter	Time trial	7:16:35.0	34
Dave Marsh	Time trial	6:56:52.4	24
Ernie Pilcher	Time trial	6:54:02.0	23
Andy Wilson	Time trial	6:53:52.4	22
Samuel Hunter; Dave Marsh; Ernie Pilcher; Andy Wilson	Team time trial	20:44:46.8	7

=== Track cycling ===
Ranks given are within the heat.

Cyclist	Event	First round		First repechage		Quarterfinals		Second repechage		Semifinals		Final	
Cyclist	Event	Result	Rank	Result	Rank	Result	Rank	Result	Rank	Result	Rank	Result	Rank
Cyril Alden	50 km	N/A										Unknown	2nd place, silver medalist(s)
Herbert Fuller	Sprint	13.8	1 Q	Advanced directly		13.0	1 Q	Advanced directly		Unknown	2	did not advance	
George Owen	Sprint	Unknown	2 r	Unknown	1 Q	Unknown	3 r	Unknown	4	did not advance			
Harry Wyld	50 km	N/A										Unknown	3rd place, bronze medalist(s)
Frederick Habberfield; Thomas Harvey	Tandem	N/A								Unknown	2	did not advance	
Frederick Habberfield; Thomas Harvey; Henry Lee; William Stewart	Team pursuit	Unknown	2	N/A		did not advance		N/A		did not advance			

== Diving ==
Eleven divers, five men and six women, represented Great Britain in 1924. It was the nation's fourth appearance in the sport. Clarke's bronze in the plain high diving competition resulted in Great Britain winning a single medal for the third consecutive Games.

Ranks given are within the heat.

Men

Diver	Event	Semifinals			Final		
Diver	Event	Points	Score	Rank	Points	Score	Rank
Harold Clarke	Plain high diving	9	162	1 Q	15.5	158	3rd place, bronze medalist(s)
Albert Dickin	Plain high diving	25.5	141	6	did not advance		
Albert Knight	10 m platform	19	394.5	4	did not advance		
Albert Knight	Plain high diving	12	156	3 Q	31	137	7
Eric MacDonald	3 m board	29	433.2	6	did not advance		
Eric MacDonald	10 m platform	25	345.5	5	did not advance		
Gregory Matveieff	3 m board	21	414.1	4	did not advance		

Women

Diver	Event	Semifinals			Final		
Diver	Event	Points	Score	Rank	Points	Score	Rank
Beatrice Armstrong	10 m platform	27.5	141	6	did not advance		
Amelia Hudson	3 m board	23	345.2	5	did not advance		
Gladys Luscombe	3 m board	40.5	244.0	8	did not advance		
Verrall Newman	10 m platform	18	154	4	did not advance		
Cecily O'Bryen	3 m board	35	258.8	7	did not advance		
Isabelle White	10 m platform	9.5	150	2 Q	28.5	140	6

== Equestrian ==
Six equestrians represented Great Britain in 1924. It was the nation's second appearance in the sport, and first since 1912. Bowden-Smith matched the country's best result to date with a fourth-place finish in the jumping event.

Equestrian	Event	Final		
Equestrian	Event	Score	Time	Rank
Philip Bowden-Smith	Eventing	878.0	N/A	29
Philip Bowden-Smith	Jumping	10.50	2:41.4	4
Geoffrey Brooke	Jumping	29.75	3:02.6	27
Capel Brunker	Jumping	25.50	2:45.0	24
Edward de Fonblanque	Eventing	1728.5	N/A	6
Keith Hervey	Eventing	1354.0	N/A	19
Keith Hervey	Jumping	did not finish		
Alec Tod	Eventing	982.0	N/A	22
Philip Bowden-Smith; Geoffrey Brooke; Capel Brunker; Keith Hervey	Team jumping	65.75	N/A	7
Philip Bowden-Smith; Edward de Fonblanque; Keith Hervey; Alec Tod	Team eventing	4064.5	N/A	6

== Fencing ==
20 fencers, 16 men and 4 women, represented Great Britain in 1924. It was the nation's fifth appearance in the sport. Great Britain was one of nine nations to enter women in the first Olympic women's fencing competition; Davis took second in the event to give Great Britain its first individual fencing medal, and first fencing medal since the épée team took silver in 1912.

Men

Ranks given are within the pool.

Fencer	Event	Round 1		Round 2		Quarterfinals		Semifinals		Final	
Fencer	Event	Result	Rank	Result	Rank	Result	Rank	Result	Rank	Result	Rank
Charles Biscoe	Épée	6–3	2 Q	N/A		4–5	6 Q	4–7	7	did not advance	
Archibald Corble	Sabre	N/A				3–4	5	did not advance			
Robin Dalglish	Sabre	N/A				3–3	3 Q	3–5	7	did not advance	
Philip Doyne	Foil	3–1	2 Q	2–3	4	did not advance					
Robert Frater	Épée	6–2	1 Q	N/A		2–8	10	did not advance			
Martin Holt	Épée	4–4	5 Q	N/A		2–8	11	did not advance			
Cecil Kershaw	Sabre	N/A				3–3	5	did not advance			
Robert Montgomerie	Épée	2–6	8	N/A		did not advance					
Robert Montgomerie	Foil	2–1	2 Q	4–1	2 Q	2–3	5	did not advance			
Edgar Seligman	Foil	4–0	1 Q	5–0	1 Q	4–1	1 Q	4–1	2 Q	did not start	
Edgar Seligman	Sabre	N/A				3–2	3 Q	did not finish		did not advance	
Frederick Sherriff	Foil	2–2	3 Q	0–5	6	did not advance					
Philip Doyne; Robert Montgomerie; Edgar Seligman; Frederick Sherriff; Roland Willoughby	Team foil	Bye		N/A		0–2	3	did not advance			
Charles Biscoe; Archibald Craig; Robert Frater; Martin Holt; Robert Montgomerie; Charles Notley	Team épée	1–0	2 Q	N/A		0–2	4	did not advance			
Edward Brookfield; Archibald Corble; Robin Dalglish; William Hammond; Cecil Kershaw; William Marsh	Team sabre	0–2	3	N/A		did not advance					

Women

Ranks given are within the pool.

Fencer	Event	Quarterfinals		Semifinals		Final	
Fencer	Event	Result	Rank	Result	Rank	Result	Rank
Gladys Daniell	Foil	5–0	1 Q	1–4	5	did not advance	
Gladys Davis	Foil	4–2	2 Q	5–0	1 Q	4–1	2nd place, silver medalist(s)
Muriel Freeman	Foil	4–1	2 Q	4–1	2 Q	2–3	4
Alice Walker	Foil	1–4	6	did not advance			

== Gymnastics ==
Eight gymnasts represented Great Britain in 1924. It was the nation's sixth appearance in the sport, matching France for most appearances to that point.

=== Artistic ===
Gymnast	Event	Final	
Gymnast	Event	Score	Rank
Harold Brown	All-around	87.059	40
Harold Brown	Horizontal bar	14.206	43
Harold Brown	Parallel bars	18.20	49
Harold Brown	Pommel horse	14.370	45
Harold Brown	Rings	15.533	47
Harold Brown	Rope climbing	8 (9.4 s)	24
Harold Brown	Sidehorse vault	7.83	59
Harold Brown	Vault	8.92	19
Henry Finchett	All-around	81.710	43
Henry Finchett	Horizontal bar	12.290	54
Henry Finchett	Parallel bars	16.83	58
Henry Finchett	Pommel horse	15.300	41
Henry Finchett	Rings	17.760	33
Henry Finchett	Rope climbing	2 (11.4 s)	51
Henry Finchett	Sidehorse vault	9.08	33
Henry Finchett	Vault	8.45	22
Frank Hawkins	All-around	73.796	49
Frank Hawkins	Horizontal bar	9.733	68
Frank Hawkins	Parallel bars	18.20	49
Frank Hawkins	Pommel horse	13.263	47
Frank Hawkins	Rings	14.500	56
Frank Hawkins	Rope climbing	7 (9.6 s)	31
Frank Hawkins	Sidehorse vault	7.83	59
Frank Hawkins	Vault	3.27	63
Thomas Hopkins	All-around	72.350	54
Thomas Hopkins	Horizontal bar	10.840	64
Thomas Hopkins	Parallel bars	16.20	61
Thomas Hopkins	Pommel horse	11.210	53
Thomas Hopkins	Rings	13.750	57
Thomas Hopkins	Rope climbing	2 (11.4 s)	51
Thomas Hopkins	Sidehorse vault	9.13	31
Thomas Hopkins	Vault	9.22	16
Samuel Humphreys	All-around	64.656	64
Samuel Humphreys	Horizontal bar	10.933	63
Samuel Humphreys	Parallel bars	12.36	70
Samuel Humphreys	Pommel horse	11.100	54
Samuel Humphreys	Rings	15.493	48
Samuel Humphreys	Rope climbing	2 (11.2 s)	50
Samuel Humphreys	Sidehorse vault	8.17	54
Samuel Humphreys	Vault	4.60	59
Edward Leigh	All-around	69.200	55
Edward Leigh	Horizontal bar	12.120	57
Edward Leigh	Parallel bars	17.21	53
Edward Leigh	Pommel horse	13.200	48
Edward Leigh	Rings	18.500	26
Edward Leigh	Rope climbing	0 (12.2 s)	62
Edward Leigh	Sidehorse vault	8.17	54
Edward Leigh	Vault	0.00	67
Stanley Leigh	All-around	91.266	35
Stanley Leigh	Horizontal bar	18.350	13
Stanley Leigh	Parallel bars	20.28	23
Stanley Leigh	Pommel horse	17.490	25
Stanley Leigh	Rings	18.666	25
Stanley Leigh	Rope climbing	2 (11.6 s)	55
Stanley Leigh	Sidehorse vault	9.41	25
Stanley Leigh	Vault	5.07	56
Alfred Spencer	All-around	64.253	65
Alfred Spencer	Horizontal bar	12.893	51
Alfred Spencer	Parallel bars	11.90	71
Alfred Spencer	Pommel horse	14.060	46
Alfred Spencer	Rings	11.750	64
Alfred Spencer	Rope climbing	1 (11.8 s)	58
Alfred Spencer	Sidehorse vault	7.50	65
Alfred Spencer	Vault	5.15	55
Harold Brown; Henry Finchett; Frank Hawkins; Thomas Hopkins; Samuel Humphreys; Edward Leigh; Stanley Leigh; Alfred Spencer	Team	637.790	6

== Modern pentathlon ==
Four pentathletes represented Great Britain in 1924. It was the nation's third appearance in the sport. Great Britain was one of six nations to have competed in each edition of the Olympic modern pentathlon to that time.

Pentathlete	Event	Final	
Pentathlete	Event	Score	Rank
Frederick Barton	Individual	122.5	28
Brian Horrocks	Individual	98.5	19
David Turquand-Young	Individual	84.5	13
George Vokins	Individual	64.5	7

== Polo ==
Great Britain sent a polo team to the Olympics for the fourth time in 1924. Great Britain was the only nation to send poloists to each Olympic polo tournament. The team beat both of the other European teams, France and Spain, but lost to each of the American teams, Argentina and the United States, in the round-robin tournament to finish with the bronze medal.

Ranks given are within the pool.

Players	Event	Round robin				
Players	Event	Wins	Losses	Points for	Points against	Rank
Frederick Barrett; Dennis Bingham; Fred Guest; Kinnear Wise	Men's polo	2	2	33	24	3rd place, bronze medalist(s)

July 3

United States	10–2	Great Britain

July 5

Great Britain	16–2	France

July 7

Great Britain	10–3	Spain

July 9

Argentina	9–5	Great Britain

== Rowing ==
21 rowers represented Great Britain in 1924. It was the nation's fifth appearance in the sport, tying Belgium and Canada for most appearances. For the first time, some of the British rowers competed without winning medals; prior to 1924, Great Britain won 15 medals with its 15 entries. In 1924, the rowers took only two gold medals in their five entries.

Ranks given are within the heat.

Rower	Event	Semifinals		Repechage		Final	
Rower	Event	Result	Rank	Result	Rank	Result	Rank
Jack Beresford	Single sculls	Unknown	2 r	8:00.4	1 Q	7:49.2	1st place, gold medalist(s)
Gordon Killick; Cyril Southgate	Coxless pair	Unknown	2 r	Walkover		Did not start	3
Maxwell Eley; James MacNabb; Robert Morrison; Terence Sanders	Coxless four	6:43.0	1 Q	N/A		7:08.6	1st place, gold medalist(s)
Harry Barnsley; Vince Bovington; Bernard Croucher; Thomas Monk; John Townend	Coxed four	Unknown	2 r	Unknown	2	did not advance	
Reginald Bare; Edward Chandler; Horace Debenham; Peter Dulley; Ian Fairbairn; Jack Godwin; Arthur Long; Harold Morphy; Charles Rew	Eight	6:04.0	1 Q	Advanced directly		Unknown	4

== Sailing ==
Five sailors represented Great Britain in 1924. It was the nation's fourth appearance in the sport. The British team finished with a silver medal; it was the first time Great Britain competed in sailing but did not win any gold medals in the sport.

Sailor	Event	Qualifying				Final			
Sailor	Event	Race 1	Race 2	Race 3	Total	Race 1	Race 2	Total	Rank
Harold Fowler	Olympic monotype	4	2 Q	N/A		6	6	12	7
Harold Fowler; Edwin Jacob; Thomas Riggs; Walter Riggs; Ernest Roney	8 metre class	3	1 Q	3	8	2	3	5	2nd place, silver medalist(s)

== Shooting ==
Twenty-two sport shooters represented Great Britain in 1924. It was the nation's sixth appearance in the sport; Great Britain was one of three countries (along with Denmark and France) to have competed in each Olympic shooting contest. Mackworth-Praed took a pair of silver medals in the individual running deer competitions and led the British team to the gold medal in the double shots running deer event.

Shooter	Event	Final	
Shooter	Event	Score	Rank
William Artis	50 m rifle, prone	369	52
Charles Bounton	25 m rapid fire pistol	17	9
Frederick Bracegirdle	50 m rifle, prone	367	55
John Clift	50 m rifle, prone	365	57
Henry Douglas	600 m free rifle	80	34
John Faunthorpe	100 m deer, single shots	31	21
Peter Griffiths	25 m rapid fire pistol	13	40
Enoch Jenkins	Trap	94	11
David Lewis	50 m rifle, prone	371	49
Charles Mackie	25 m rapid fire pistol	16	21
Cyril Mackworth-Praed	100 m deer, single shots	39	2nd place, silver medalist(s)
Cyril Mackworth-Praed	100 m deer, double shots	72	2nd place, silver medalist(s)
Cyril Mackworth-Praed	Trap	Unknown	31–44
Alexander Martin	600 m free rifle	87	9
Thomas Northcote	600 m free rifle	82	24
John O'Leary	Trap	89	24
Herbert Perry	100 m deer, double shots	59	13
Ted Ranken	100 m deer, single shots	30	22
Ted Ranken	100 m deer, double shots	51	22
Alexander Rogers	100 m deer, single shots	26	26
Allen Whitty	100 m deer, double shots	56	18
John Faunthorpe; Cyril Mackworth-Praed; John O'Leary; Alexander Rogers	Team deer, single shots	136	4
Cyril Mackworth-Praed; Philip Neame; Herbert Perry; Allen Whitty	Team deer, double shots	263	1st place, gold medalist(s)
William Grosvenor; Enoch Jenkins; Hans Larsen; Cyril Mackworth-Praed; George Neal; John O'Leary	Team clay pigeons	328	8

== Swimming ==
Ranks given are within the heat.

Men

Swimmer	Event	Heats		Semifinals		Final	
Swimmer	Event	Result	Rank	Result	Rank	Result	Rank
Harold Annison	400 m freestyle	5:32.6	2 Q	5:39.4	4	did not advance	
Harold Annison	1500 m freestyle	22:38.4	1 Q	23:11.8	4	did not advance	
Charles Baillie	100 m freestyle	1:08.2	4	did not advance			
Albert Dickin	100 m freestyle	1:06.0	5	did not advance			
Reginald Flint	200 m breaststroke	3:05.2	1 Q	3:06.8	5	did not advance	
Jack Hatfield	400 m freestyle	5:32.6	2 Q	5:30.4	3 q	5:32.0	5
Jack Hatfield	1500 m freestyle	22:26.8	2 Q	21:53.4	3 q	21:55.6	4
Edward Maw	200 m breaststroke	3:07.2	2 Q	3:07.0	4	did not advance	
John McDowall	100 m backstroke	1:21.8	2 Q	1:22.0	5	did not advance	
Edward Peter	400 m freestyle	5:38.6	3	did not advance			
Alfred Pycock	100 m freestyle	1:05.2	2 Q	1:05.0	4	did not advance	
Austin Rawlinson	100 m backstroke	1:18.8	1 Q	1:19.2	2 Q	1:20.0	5
William Stoney	200 m breaststroke	3:10.3	5	did not advance			
John Taylor	1500 m freestyle	23:16.6	2 Q	23:13.8	6	did not advance	
James Worthington	100 m backstroke	1:23.2	3 q	1:24.2	4	did not advance	
Harold Annison; Albert Dickin; Edward Peter; Leslie Savage^{*} John Thomson	4 × 200 m freestyle relay	10:52.6	2 Q	10:31.2	2 Q	10:29.4	5

^{*} – Indicates athlete swam in the preliminaries but not in the final race.

Women

Swimmer	Event	Heats		Semifinals		Final	
Swimmer	Event	Result	Rank	Result	Rank	Result	Rank
Florence Barker	100 m freestyle	1:20.8	2 Q	1:21.4	5	did not advance	
Helen Boyle	100 m backstroke	—N/a		1:43.0	3	did not advance	
Gladys Carson	200 m breaststroke	—N/a		3:30.0	1 Q	3:35.4	3rd place, bronze medalist(s)
Irene Gilbert	200 m breaststroke	—N/a		3:32.8	2 Q	3:38.0	5
Phyllis Harding	100 m backstroke	—N/a		1:29.4	2 Q	1:27.4	2nd place, silver medalist(s)
Constance Jeans	100 m freestyle	1:16.0	1 Q	1:16.6	2 Q	1:15.4	4
Constance Jeans	400 m freestyle	6:34.6	2 Q	6:37.8	4	did not advance	
Ellen King	100 m backstroke	—N/a		1:38.2	4	did not advance	
Doris Molesworth	400 m freestyle	6:28.6	2 Q	6:19.8	2 Q	6:25.4	4
Lucy Morton	200 m breaststroke	—N/a		3:29.4	1 Q	3:33.2	1st place, gold medalist(s)
Iris Tanner	100 m freestyle	1:22.4	2 Q	1:18.6	3 q	1:20.8	5
Iris Tanner	400 m freestyle	6:35.4	2 Q	6:34.0	3	did not advance	
Florence Barker; Constance Jeans; Grace McKenzie; Iris Tanner	4 × 100 m freestyle relay	—N/a				5:17.0	2nd place, silver medalist(s)

== Tennis ==
Men

Athlete	Event	Round of 128	Round of 64	Round of 32	Round of 16	Quarterfinals	Semifinals	Final	
Athlete	Event	Opposition Score	Opposition Score	Opposition Score	Opposition Score	Opposition Score	Opposition Score	Opposition Score	Rank
John Gilbert	Singles	Đurđenski (YUG); W 8–6, 6–1, 2–6, 6–2	Leembruggen (NED); W 6–1, 12–10, 6–1	Bayley (AUS); W 7–5, 9–7, 6–1	Harada (JPN); L 8–10, 6–2, 9–11, 2–6	did not advance			
Algernon Kingscote	Singles	Rohrer (TCH); W 6–3, 6–4, 4–6, 3–6, 6–3	Müller (SWE); W 6–2, 7–5, 6–2	Granholm (FIN); W 6–2, 6–0, 6–2	Borotra (FRA); L 1–6, 3–6, 1–6	did not advance			
John Wheatley	Singles	Fukuda (JPN); L 2–6, 4–6, 3–6	did not advance						
Max Woosnam	Singles	Bye	Thalbitzer (DEN); W 6–1, 6–1, 6–2	Spence (RSA); L 6–4, 8–10, 3–6, 6–3, 3–6	did not advance				
Leslie Godfree; Max Woosnam	Doubles	—N/a	Rohrer / Gottlieb (TCH); L 3–6, 4–6, 2–6	did not advance					
Algernon Kingscote; John Wheatley	Doubles	—N/a	J. Alonso / M. Alonso (ESP); L 4–6, 3–6, 1–6	did not advance					

Women

Athlete	Event	Round of 64	Round of 32	Round of 16	Quarterfinals	Semifinals	Final	
Athlete	Event	Opposition Score	Opposition Score	Opposition Score	Opposition Score	Opposition Score	Opposition Score	Rank
Phyllis Covell	Singles	Wallis (IRL); W 3–6, 6–0, 6–2	Várady-Péter (HUN); W 6–1, 6–3	Golding (FRA); L 3–6, 6–3, 2–6	did not advance			
Kathleen McKane	Singles	Bye	de Borman (BEL); W 6–0, 6–2	Fick (SWE); W 6–1, 6–1	Jessup (USA); W 6–2, 6–0	Vlasto (FRA); L 6–0, 5–7, 1–6	Bronze medal final Golding (FRA); W 5–7, 6–3, 6–0	3rd place, bronze medalist(s)
Phyllis Satterthwaite	Singles	Bye	Bye	Wills Moody (USA); L 1–6, 1–6	did not advance			
Dorothy Shepherd-Barron	Singles	Bye	Storms (BEL); W 6–1, 6–1	Gagliardi (ITA); W 6–1, 6–0	Vlasto (FRA); L 4–6, 2–6	did not advance		
Evelyn Colyer; Dorothy Shepherd-Barron	Doubles	—N/a	Bye	Bye	Golding / Vaussard (FRA); W 6–2, 6–2	Wills Moody / Wightman (USA); L 3–6, 6–1, 5–7	Bronze medal final Billout / Bourgeois (FRA); W 6–1, 6–2	3rd place, bronze medalist(s)
Phyllis Covell; Kathleen McKane	Doubles	—N/a	Jessup / Goss (USA); W 6–1, 6–2	de Borman / Storms (BEL); W 6–1, 6–2	Fick / von Essen (USA); W 6–2, 6–3	Billout / Bourgeois (FRA); W 6–2, 6–2	Wills Moody / Wightman (USA); L 5–7, 6–8	2nd place, silver medalist(s)

Mixed

Athlete	Event	Round of 32	Round of 16	Quarterfinals	Semifinals	Final	
Athlete	Event	Opposition Score	Opposition Score	Opposition Score	Opposition Score	Opposition Score	Rank
Phyllis Covell; Leslie Godfree	Doubles	Blair-White / Ireland (IRL); W 6–2, 6–4	Bye	Bouman / Timmer (NED); L 1–6, 5–7	did not advance		
John Gilbert; Kathleen McKane	Doubles	Bye	Perelli / de Morpurgo (ITA); W 9–7, 1–6, 7–6	Wallis / McCrea (IRL); W 6–1, 7–5	Wightman / Williams (USA); L 6–2, 6–8, 1–6	Bronze medal final Bouman / Timmer (NED); L Retired	4

== Water polo ==
Great Britain made its fifth Olympic water polo appearance (having missed only the 1904 tournament). The team, which had won the gold medal in all four of its prior appearances, lost a one-goal game to Hungary in the first round, eliminating it from medal contention early.

Roster

- Harold Annison
- John Budd
- Charles Bugbee
- Smith D. Edward
- R. Haston
- Richard Hodgson
- Arthur Hunt
- William Peacock
- Paul Radmilovic
- Charles Sydney

First round

Hungary	7–6	Great Britain	Piscine des Tourelles

== Weightlifting ==
Athlete	Event	1H Snatch	1H Clean & Jerk	Press	Snatch	Clean & Jerk	Total	Rank
Charles Attenborough	Men's -75 kg	65	65	80	75	102.5	387.5	17
Jack Austin	Men's -75 kg	55	70	60	75	100	360	22
Alfred Baxter	Men's -60 kg	55	65	70	75	105	370	7
Augustus Cummins	Men's -60 kg	55	65	62.5	67.5	87.5	337.5	16
Robert Lowes	Men's -75 kg	50	65	70	70	95	350	23
William Randall	Men's -67.5 kg	50	60	67.5	65	90	332.5	20
Thomas Taylor	Men's -60 kg	50	55	57.5	65	90	317.5	17
John Tooley	Men's -67.5 kg	50	65	65	70	95	345	19
Harold Wood	Men's +82.5 kg						417.5	17
William Wyatt	Men's -67.5 kg	55	65	65	72.5	95	352.5	17

== Wrestling ==
=== Freestyle wrestling ===
Men's

Athlete	Event	Round of 32	Round of 16	Quarterfinal	Semifinal	Final	
Athlete	Event	Opposition Result	Opposition Result	Opposition Result	Opposition Result	Opposition Result	Rank
Edgar Bacon	Welterweight	—N/a	Bye	Stockton (CAN); L	did not advance		
Ernest Bacon	Lightweight	—N/a	Belet (SUI); L	did not advance			
Harry Darby	Bantamweight	—N/a	Tordera (ITA); W	Pihlajamäki (FIN); L	Silver medal semifinal Mäkinen (FIN); L	did not advance	
John Davis	Welterweight	—N/a	Lundsten (FIN); W	Lookabough (USA); L	Bronze medal semifinal Johnson (USA); L	did not advance	
George Gardiner	Lightweight	—N/a	Käpp (EST); W	Belet (SUI); W	Wikström (FIN); L Bronze medal semifinal Jourdain (FRA); W	Bronze medal final Haavisto (FIN); L	4
Victor Lay	Light heavyweight	—N/a	Mylläri (FIN); L	did not advance			
Archie MacDonald	Heavyweight	—N/a	Bye	Steele (USA); L	Silver medal semifinal Bye Bronze medal semifinal Bye	Silver medal final Wernli (SUI); L Bronze medal final Bye	3rd place, bronze medalist(s)
George MacKenzie	Featherweight	Bye	Torgensen (DEN); L	did not advance			
Noel Rhys	Middleweight	—N/a	Bye	Nilsson (SWE); W	Hagemann (SUI); L	Silver medal semifinal Ollivier (BEL); L	did not advance
Bernard Rowe	Middleweight	—N/a	Tognetti (SUI); L	did not advance			
Alex Sangwine	Heavyweight	—N/a	Richthoff (SWE); L	did not advance			
Harold Sansum	Bantamweight	—N/a	Trifunov (CAN); W	Mäkinen (FIN); L	Bronze medal semifinal Ducayla (FRA); L	did not advance	
George Stott	Featherweight	Bye	Angelo (AUS); L	did not advance			
William Wilson	Light heavyweight	—N/a	Spellman (USA); L	Did not advance	Silver medal semifinal Rumple (CAN); W Bronze medal semifinal Retired	Silver medal final Svensson (SWE); L	Did not advance
