= Lucien Brouha =

Belgian rower and exercise physiologist

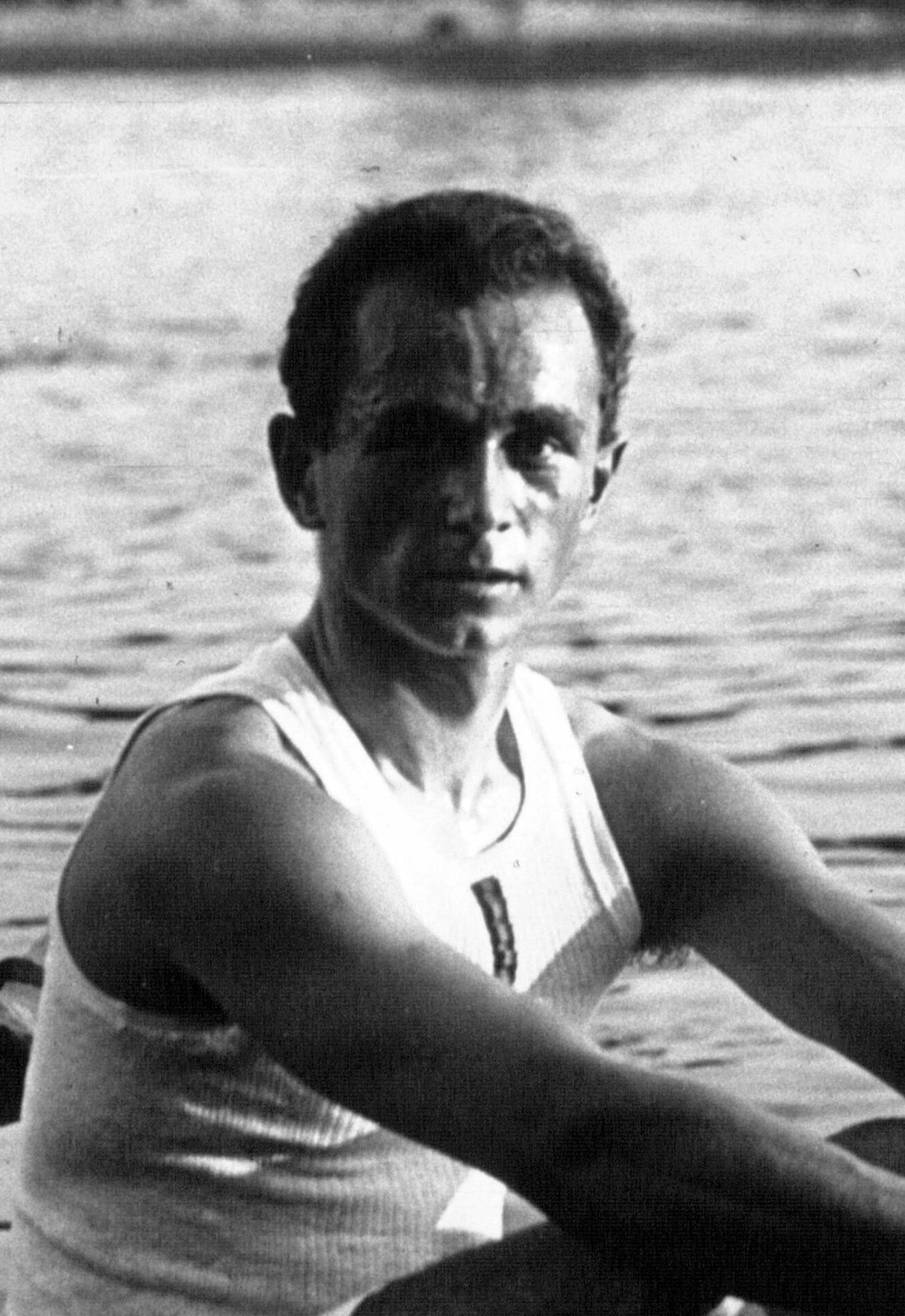
- Brouha in 1921
- Born: Lucien Antoine Maurice Brouha; 26 October 1899; Liège, Belgium
- Died: 6 October 1968 (aged 68); Liège, Belgium
- Resting place: Robermont Cemetery
- Education: University of Liège
- Known for: Rabbit test Harvard step test
- Father: Maurice Brouha
- Relatives: Marcel Dubuisson (brother-in-law)
- Awards: Gilbreth Medal
- Scientific career
- Fields: Exercise physiologist Occupational ergonomics
- Patrons: Belgian American Educational Foundation (BAEF)
- Sports career
- Sport: Rowing
Medal record
Men's rowing
Representing Belgium
European Rowing Championships
Silver medal – second place	1921 Amsterdam	Double sculls
Bronze medal – third place	1922 Barcelona	Double sculls
Bronze medal – third place	1924 Zürich	Coxed four

Lucien Antoine Maurice Brouha (26 October 1899 – 6 October 1968) was a Belgian rower who later became a notable exercise physiologist in the United States. He won three medals (one silver and two bronze) at European Rowing Championships between 1921 and 1924. He attended the 1924 Paris Olympics but his team was eliminated in the repechage. In his early medical career, he helped develop an early pregnancy test at the University of Liège. From the 1930s, his academic interest shifted towards exercise physiology. Between 1934 and the outbreak of World War II, Brouha travelled on scholarships on several occasions to conduct research at universities in the United States. Having been imprisoned during World War I, he left Belgium for Paris due to increasing tension with Nazi Germany in early 1940.

Later in 1940, Brouha relocated to Harvard University, Massachusetts. At Harvard, he focused on military research for the United States Army. He is best known for developing the Harvard step test, a simple fitness test first used by the army but later also used for civilian purposes. He moved to the private sector in Canada in 1944, where he helped shape the field of ergonomics, but retained connections to various universities.

== Early life ==
Brouha was born on 26 October 1899 in Liège, Belgium. His father, Maurice Brouha (1875–1948), was a gynaecologist and obstetrician. As a high school student during World War I, Brouha Jr couriered dispatches and was imprisoned by the Germans when they discovered these activities in 1917. When he was released in 1918 and returned home, his mother could not recognise him as he was so thin and unclean; he had also lost most of his hearing. After the war, he was awarded the Political Prisoner's Medal 1914–1918; this was awarded by Belgium to those who had been imprisoned for at least one month by the enemy.

== Rowing ==
Brouha's physical fitness recovered after his release, and he took up the sports of field hockey and sprinting, as well as rowing, which became his main interest. He was a member of UNL, the Union Nautique de Liège, a water sports club based in Liège. He rowed with fellow club member Jules George in the double scull and competed at the 1921 European Rowing Championships in Amsterdam, where they won a silver medal. At the 1922 European Rowing Championships in Barcelona, they won bronze in this boat class. They were Belgian national champions in 1922 and 1923 in double scull.

For the 1924 rowing season, Brouha and George were part of a men's coxed four. Alongside Victor Denis and Marcel Roman as rowers and coxswain Georges Anthony, they went to the 1924 Paris Olympics where they were eliminated in the round one repechage. The four rowers went afterwards to the 1924 European Rowing Championships in Zürich, where they won bronze.

== Scientific career ==
=== Belgium ===
Brouha graduated with a Doctor of Medicine in Surgery and Obstetrics from the University of Liège in 1924; his father worked at this university and would become a professor the following year. He subsequently joined the university's Institute Léon Fredericq, where he researched endocrinology. His sister, Adèle Brouha, also worked in endocrinology at the University of Liège at that time. In 1931, he worked with two French researchers (Hermann Hinglais and Henri Simmonet, with input by Hinglais' spouse Marguerite), and developed what became known as the Brouha-Hinglais-Simonnet reaction, an early pregnancy test using rabbits. This test built on research undertaken by Selmar Aschheim and Bernhard Zondek, and their test (known as the AZ test) involving injections into female mice. His sister also built on the work of Aschheim and Zondek; sources do not specify whether Lucien Brouha or his sister made improvements to the Aschheim and Zondek research first. Lucien Brouha and his researchers found a 40-percent error rate with the AZ test, which they modified by switching from female to male mice. Later, they used male and female rabbits. By the end of the 1930s, scientists had developed 48 different pregnancy tests, with one of the two most common tests known as the Friedman-Brouha test carried out using rabbits, also known as a rabbit test.

In October 1932, Brouha was appointed as lecturer at the Higher Institute of Physical Education (HIPE) in the Faculty of Medicine at the University of Liège. HIPE facilitated doctorates in physical education; Brouha got the position in part because of his own athletic career. The Ministry of Public Instruction arranged for Brouha to undertake a study tour of other European institutes that offered research in physical education so that HIPE could learn from these institutes. Brouha was particularly impressed by the work undertaken by August Krogh in zoophysiology at the University of Copenhagen, and by Edgar Atzler's work at the Kaiser Wilhelm Society for Occupational Physiology in Dortmund (now the Max Planck Society; the building where Atzler was based is now the Max Planck Institute of Molecular Physiology). Brouha's major conclusion from this study tour was the need for various laboratories that could assist in the research work.

Brouha received scholarships from the Belgian American Educational Foundation (BAEF); this was a subsidiary of the American Commission for Relief in Belgium (CRB) that had supplied food to Belgium during WWI under the leadership of Herbert Hoover. About a quarter of Belgian academic staff could travel during the interwar years to the United States with BAEF funding, which equated to about 20 academics per year, and Brouha received more funding than anybody else from Belgium. His first stay in the US was in 1934, when he spent three months at various universities. In 1935, he stayed four months in the US. He spent most of this time at the Harvard Fatigue Laboratory (HFL) at the Boston campus of Harvard University, where George Wells Fitz had established a programme in Anatomy, Physiology, and Physical Training; one of the earliest university programmes of this kind. He also visited Yale University, the University of Chicago, and Springfield College. Major connections were with Peter Karpovich at Springfield College and with Walter Bradford Cannon at HFL. Brouha and Cannon facilitated a close connection between HFL and Belgium; many Belgian physiology academics went to Harvard for research, and a number of papers were co-authored by American and Belgian academics. Brouha's early research at HFL expanded on experiments on dogs that he had previously carried out with Corneille Heymans from Ghent University. From 1936, Brouha increasingly specialised in exercise physiology. After a stay at HFL over the 1937/38 winter, Brouha was appointed as full professor at Liège backdated to 1 January 1938.

=== North America ===
The tension in Europe preceding World War II weighed heavily on Brouha's mind and in February 1940, he and his wife left Belgium to join the French National Research Council in Paris; shortly after, in May 1940, his laboratory in Liège was destroyed through bombardment during the German invasion of Belgium. Guy La Chambre assigned him to the French Air Force, where he worked in the Laboratory of the Medico-Physiological Services with physiologist André Mayer. Brouha's role was to test pilots for physical fitness and fatigue. He had, however, been asked by Cannon and Lawrence Joseph Henderson to move to Harvard on several occasions following his 1930s research visits, and in August 1940 he answered their calls and arrived in Boston. He was to be at Harvard until 1944 as a physiologist and had been a research fellow at the Harvard Fatigue Laboratory from 1934 to 1940.

At Harvard, Brouha worked under Henderson and David Bruce Dill on military research at the HFL. Brouha was appointed as research associate and tutor, covering biomedical sciences. The focus on military research was necessary for the research team as their funding from the Rockefeller Foundation was about to run out and funding from the military was readily available. The United States Army requested that a simple endurance test be developed with which they could assess the fitness of soldiers. The idea was to utilise treadmills that had been in use at HFL since 1928; at the time, these were large and immobile, and of no practical use for the army beyond fitness tests. William H. Forbes, William L. Woods, Brouha and Carl Seltzer developed requirements that needed to be met by a simple fitness test. These requirements were that the test must:

- take no more than 10 minutes
- be hard work, so that one-fourth to one-third of participants cannot finish 5 minutes
- use large muscle groups
- not require a high skill level
- be of similar difficulty for participants with different body types
- be in proportion to the size of the participants
- be standardised and repeatable

Brouha took on the task of developing such a test. In the first instance, he wrote a report for the Office of Scientific Research and Development comparing the existing tests against the above criteria. Brouha and his colleagues found that the Harvard Pack Test came closest to meeting the requirements. This test required subjects to carry a pack weighing a third of their body weight, and to step up and down a 16-inch-high (41 cm) step every two seconds. The subject's pulse was taken over three 30-second intervals after the exercise stopped, and the sum of heartbeats plus the duration of the exercise in seconds were entered into an equation that gave a fitness index. The disadvantage of this test was the requirement for different-sized "weight packs".

Brouha adapted the Harvard Pack Test in 1942 by using a higher step (20 inches or 51 centimetres) and by omitting the pack. Initially called the "Step Test", the researchers added a prefix to differentiate it from earlier step tests and the method became known as the Harvard step test (HST), with scientific literature first published in 1943. The HST was initially used by the army and the navy for grading their personnel but was subsequently used for recruitment purposes. During 1943, the HST was promoted to schools and colleges, with the idea being that fitness would not improve if exercise was either too strenuous or too easy, hence it was better to grade students prior to physical training. Also during 1943, the HST was adopted by the Association of Boy Scouts of America for boys who had reached high school age. When Hans Vangrunderbeek and Pascal Delheye wrote a scientific paper about the history of the HST in 2013, they found that many researchers still used the HST as a reference test when developing fitness tests.

Brouha left Harvard in 1944. He had received offers from several universities but he moved into the private sector and was employed by the Aluminum Company of Canada. From late 1945, Brouha was in parallel professor at the Université Laval, where he was jointly leading the Institute of Hygiene and Human Biology with the biologist Louis-Paul Dugal.

Brouha left the aluminium manufacturer in 1950 and moved to E. I. du Pont de Nemours and Company. Brouha was hired by Du Pont's Haskell Laboratory of Toxicology and Industrial Medicine at their Maryland office when that research office extended its scope from toxicology to also include physiology. In the late 1950s, the role of the Haskell Laboratory was assessed by its director. The recommendation was to cut back on fundamental research, which was accepted by Du Pont's executive committee. Brouha's team formed that part of the laboratory that undertook most of the fundamental research and it is unclear what became of Brouha. He led the Fitness Research Unit of the Université de Montréal up until he died in 1968. But in a diamond anniversary edition of a journal published by the Society for Advancement of Management (SAM) in 1988, Brouha is listed as a representative of E. I. du Pont de Nemours and Company in relation to the 1968 SAM conference.

For private industry, Brouha studied the physiological problems that workers experience and through this work helped shape the field of occupational ergonomics. In 1968, Brouha won the Gilbreth Medal. The Lucien Brouha Work Physiology Symposium, also known as the Brouha Symposium, has been held since 1961 as a conference for work physiology.

== Family ==
Brouha's younger brother Paul (1910–1943) was a resistance fighter who was caught by the Germans in early 1943 and executed at the Citadel of Liège on 31 May 1943. Paul's widow, Suzanne Brouha (née Ledent), married Jean Rey in 1950. His sister Adèle married Marcel Dubuisson, who was rector of the University of Liège from 1953 to 1971.

Brouha was married to Elizabeth Shaler. Her father was the American mining engineer Millard Shaler who was in Belgium at the beginning of WWI. Appointed by Herbert Hoover, Mr. Shaler held high positions with the Commission for Relief in Belgium. Brouha and Shaler had two sons.

== Death ==
Brouha died on 6 October 1968 "after a long and painful illness" in Liège, Belgium; he was survived by his wife and their two children. His funeral at the Robermont Cemetery was attended by close family only.
