= Bob Gerhardt =

American rower

Personal information
- Full name: Robert Buchanan Gerhardt
- Born: October 3, 1903 Baltimore, Maryland
- Died: January 23, 1989 (aged 85) Erdenheim, Pennsylvania
- Height: 190 cm (6 ft 3 in)
- Spouse: Elizabeth Arnott
- Children: 1 son

Sport
- Club: Arundale Barge Club; Bachelor's Barge Club
Medal record
Men's rowing
Bronze medal – third place	1924 Paris	Coxed four

Robert Buchanan Gerhardt (October 3, 1903 – January 23, 1989) was an American insurance businessman and broker. As a young rower, he won a bronze medal in coxed four crew in the 1924 Summer Olympics in Paris.

== Early life ==
Robert Buchanan Gerhardt was born to Mary Buchanon Gerhardt and Robert on October 3, 1903, in Baltimore, Maryland.

Gerhardt had a very short rowing career, lasting only two years. He started out rowing in a four-oared gig for the Arundel BC in Baltimore, where he was born on October 3, 1903. His family moved to Philadelphia, and he joined the Bachelor's Barge Club, moving into their four-oared shell (coxed four) when one of their sweepers decided to take up sculling (rowing with two oars) exclusively. Using their coxed four, he qualified for the Olympics in a qualifying heat with the Bachelor's Barge Rowing Club, and four other members of the Club on Philadelphia's Schuylkill River on June 13, 1924. Gerhardt rowed third from the front in the qualifying heat, in front of Sydney Jellinek at fourth or stroke.

In his professional career, Gerhardt made his living in the insurance and brokerage business, largely for Prudential Life.

== Olympics ==
After their arrival in Paris, the American coxed four team won their heat in the preliminary round with a time of 7 minutes 19 seconds for the 1.24 mile course. In the final round, the Americans won the bronze medal in the coxed four event. The coxed four rowing competition, the fourth appearance of the event, was held from July 13–17, 1924 on the river Seine. There were 10 boats (51 competitors, with Switzerland making one substitution) from 10 nations, with each nation limited to a single boat in the event. The competition was won by Switzerland, the nation's second consecutive victory in the event, with France taking the silver medal.

Coxed Four shell configuration, w/coxswain in yellow

As shown at left, the coxed four event featured five-person boats, with four rowers and a coxswain shown as a yellow dot. It was a sweep rowing event, with the rowers each having one oar and each rowing on one side. The competition used the 2000 metres (1.24 miles) distance that became standard at the 1912 Olympics and which has been used ever since. The Americans finished with a time of 7:23, only two and a half seconds behind France who took the bronze. Switzerland, the pre-race favorite, finished with a sizable three-minute lead over second place France. Bob Gerhardt took the position of bowsmen in the front, Sid Jelinek rowed in seat two, Edward Mitchell Jr. rowed third, Henry Welsford rowed fourth (last) or Sweep, and John Kennedy functioned as coxswain.

Gerhardt died on January 23, 1989, at Harston Hall Nursing Home in Erdenheim, ten miles North of Philadelphia. He worked for many years as an insurance agent for Prudential Life in the Philadelphia area. He was married to Elizabeth Arnott Gerhardt who pre-deceased him in April 1974. He was survived by a son, a granddaughter and two sisters. His funeral services were held in St. Paul's Episcopal Church.
