= Eugène Constant =

French rower (1901–1970)

Personal information
- Born: Eugène Louis Constant; 8 January 1901 Boulogne-sur-Mer, France
- Died: 22 October 1970 (aged 69) Boulogne-sur-Mer, France

Sport
- Sport: Rowing
- Club: Émulation Nautique Boulonnaise, Boulogne-sur-Mer
Medal record
Men's rowing
Representing France
Olympic Games
Silver medal – second place	1924 Paris	Coxed four
European Rowing Championships
Bronze medal – third place	1924 Zürich	Coxed pair

Eugène Louis Constant (French: [øʒɛn kɔ̃stɑ̃]; 8 January 1901 – 22 October 1970) was a French rower who competed in the 1924 Summer Olympics.

In 1924 he won the silver medal as member of the French boat in the coxed four event. He also finished fourth as part of the French boat in the coxed pair competition.
