= Victor Denis =

Victor Denis may refer to:

- Victor Denis (footballer) (1889–1972), French international footballer
- Victor Denis (rower) (1890–?), Belgian rower
