= Rouet =

Rouet may refer to:

== People ==
- Alain Rouet (born 1942), French physicist
- Albert Rouet (born 1936), French bishop
- Guillaume Rouet (born 1988), Spanish rugby union player
- Lucienne Rouet (born 1901), French swimmer

== Places ==
- Rouet, Hérault, Occitanie, France
