= Fronczak =

Fronczak is a Polish surname. It may refer to:

- Henryk Fronczak (1898–1981), Polish rower
- Paul Fronczak (born Jack Rosenthal), abandoned as a toddler
