= Wrestling at the 1924 Summer Olympics – Men's freestyle heavyweight =

Men's heavyweight freestyle wrestling at the Games of the VIII Olympiad
- Venue: Vélodrome d'Hiver
- Dates: July 11–14, 1924
- Competitors: 11 from 6 nations

Medalists
1st place, gold medalist(s)		Harry Steel	United States
2nd place, silver medalist(s)		Henri Wernli	Switzerland
3rd place, bronze medalist(s)		Archie MacDonald	Great Britain

The men's freestyle heavyweight was a freestyle wrestling event held as part of the Wrestling at the 1924 Summer Olympics programme. It was the fourth appearance of the event. Heavyweight was the heaviest category, including wrestlers weighing over 87 kilograms.

== Results ==
Source: Official results; Wudarski

=== Gold medal round ===
Round of 16
Henri Wernli (SUI)	W
Edmond Dame (FRA)	L
Johan Richthoff (SWE)	W
Albert Sangwine (GBR)	L
Hans Roth (SUI)	W
Hjalmar Nyström (FIN)	L

Quarterfinals
Henri Wernli (SUI)	W
Johan Richthoff (SWE)	L
Harry Steel (USA)	W
Archie MacDonald (GBR)	L
Ernst Nilsson (SWE)	W
Roger Flanders (USA)	L
Hans Roth (SUI)	L
Toivo Pohjala (FIN)	W

Semifinals
Henri Wernli (SUI)	L
Harry Steel (USA)	W
Ernst Nilsson (SWE)	W
Toivo Pohjala (FIN)	L

Final
Harry Steel (USA)	W
Ernst Nilsson (SWE)	L

=== Silver medal round ===
Semifinals		Final
Henri Wernli (SUI)	W
Ernst Nilsson (SWE)	L	Henri Wernli (SUI)	W
		Archie MacDonald (GBR)	L

=== Bronze medal round ===
As Nilsson, Richthoff, and Dame declined to compete, Archie MacDonald was awarded the bronze medal.
