= Robert George (rower) =

Belgian rower (1932–2006)

Personal information
- Nationality: Belgian
- Born: 4 October 1932 Liège, Belgium
- Died: 23 June 2006 (aged 73) Liège, Belgium
- Relatives: Jules Georges (father)

Sport
- Sport: Rowing

Robert George (4 October 1932 – 23 June 2006) was a Belgian rower.

== Biography ==
George was born in Liège, Belgium on 4 October 1932. His father was Jules Georges who competed at the 1924 Summer Olympics in the men's coxed four. George won the Double Sculls Challenge Cup at the 1952 Henley Royal Regatta. He competed in the men's double sculls event at the 1952 Summer Olympics where they were eliminated in the semi-final repechage. George died in Liège on 23 June 2006, at the age of 73.
