= Raymond Talleux =

French rower (1901–1982)

Personal information
- Born: Raymond Émile Julien Talleux; 2 March 1901 Boulogne-sur-Mer, France
- Died: 21 March 1982 (aged 81) Saint-Martin-Boulogne, Pas-de-Calais, France

Sport
- Sport: Rowing
- Club: Émulation Nautique Boulonnaise, Boulogne-sur-Mer
Medal record
Men's rowing
Representing France
Olympic Games
Silver medal – second place	1924 Paris	Coxed four
European Rowing Championships
Bronze medal – third place	1924 Zürich	Coxed pair

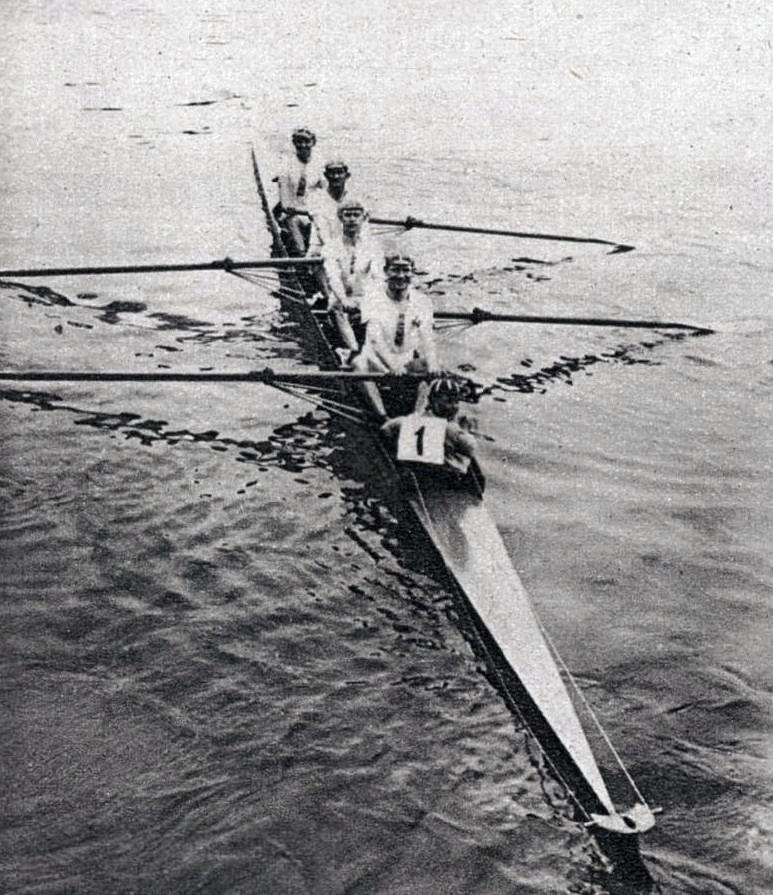
The 'Quatre' seniors of the Emulation of Boulogne (Raymond Talleux, Eugène Constant, Louis Gressier and Georges Lecointe, coxswain Marcel Lepan), in June 1924, winner of the Pre-Olympic Regattas.

Raymond Émile Julien Talleux (2 March 1901 – 21 March 1982) was a French rower who competed in the 1924 Summer Olympics.

In 1924, he won the silver medal as member of the French boat in the coxed four event. He also finished fourth as part of the French boat in the coxed pair competition.
