= Émile Lachapelle =

Swiss coxswain and sailor (1905–1988)

Personal information
- Born: Émile Henri Lachapelle; 12 September 1905
- Died: 20 February 1988 (aged 82)

Sport
- Sport: Rowing
Medal record
Men's rowing
Representing Switzerland
Olympic Games
Gold medal – first place	1924 Paris	Coxed pair
Gold medal – first place	1924 Paris	Coxed four
European Rowing Championships
Gold medal – first place	1922 Barcelona	Coxed pair
Gold medal – first place	1923 Como	Coxed pair

Émile Henri Lachapelle (12 September 1905 – 20 February 1988) was a Swiss rowing coxswain and sailor who competed in the 1924 Summer Olympics and in the 1948 Summer Olympics.

In 1924 he won the gold medal as coxswain with the Swiss boat in the coxed pair event. At the same Olympic Games, he replaced Walter Loosli as coxswain for the final in the coxed four and won a second gold medal.

In 1948 he was a member of the Swiss boat Ylliam VII which finished seventh in the 6 metre class competition.
