= Dirk Fortuin =

Dutch rower (1901–1986)

Personal information
- Born: Dirk Marten Fortuin; 14 July 1901 Amsterdam, Netherlands
- Died: 24 November 1986 (aged 85) Bussum, Netherlands

Sport
- Sport: Rowing
Medal record
Men's rowing
Representing the Netherlands
European Rowing Championships
Gold medal – first place	1924 Zürich	Coxed four
Bronze medal – third place	1927 Como	Coxed pair

Dirk Marten Fortuin (14 July 1901 – 24 November 1986) was a Dutch rower. He competed at the 1924 Summer Olympics in Paris with the men's coxed four where they did not start in the final round.
