= Josep Balsells =

Spanish rower

Personal information
- Full name: Josep Balsells Auter
- Nationality: Spanish
- Born: 26 July 1905 Barcelona, Spain
- Died: 26 August 1987 (aged 82) Barcelona, Spain

Sport
- Sport: Rowing

Achievements and titles
- Olympic finals: 1924 Summer Olympics

Josep Balsells Auter (26 July 1905 – 26 August 1987) was a Spanish rowing coxswain. He competed in the men's coxed four event at the 1924 Summer Olympics.
