= Sybil Bauer =

American swimmer (1903–1927)

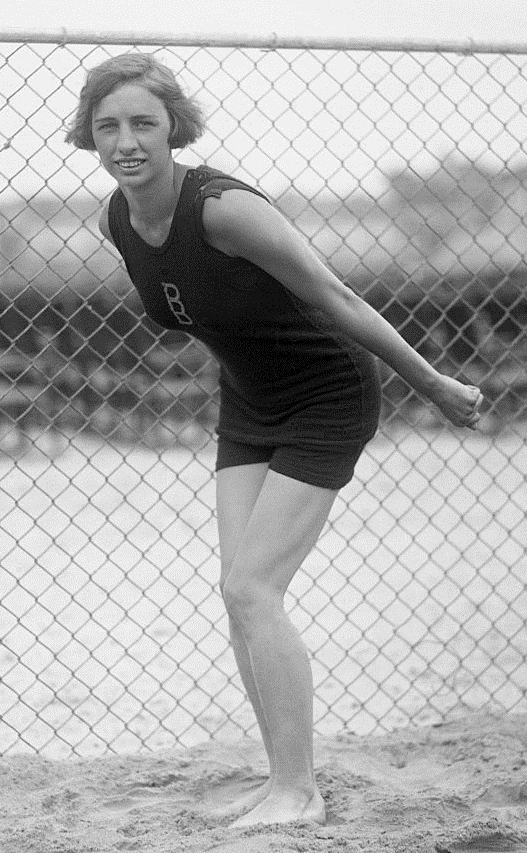
- Bauer in 1922

Personal information
- Full name: Sybil Lorina Bauer
- National team: United States
- Born: September 18, 1903 Chicago, Illinois, U.S.
- Died: January 31, 1927 (aged 23) Chicago, Illinois, U.S.

Sport
- Sport: Swimming
- Strokes: Backstroke
- Club: Illinois Athletic Club(IAC)
- College team: Northwestern University; Intramural Competition
- Coach: Bill Bachrach (IAC); Louis Handley Olympics
Medal record
Representing the United States
Olympic Games
Gold medal – first place	1924 Paris	100 m backstroke

Sybil Lorina Bauer (September 18, 1903 – January 31, 1927) was an American competition swimmer, Olympic champion, and former world record-holder. She represented the United States at the 1924 Summer Olympics, where she won the gold medal in the 100-meter backstroke in world record time.

Bauer was born one of four siblings on September 18, 1903, in Chicago, Illinois, to Carl and Johanna Torgerson Bauer, the daughter of Norwegian immigrant parents. She learned to swim at Loon Lake where her parents had a summer home. She later graduated from Chicago's Schurz High School in 1922.

== Career ==
=== Illinois Athletic Club ===
Beginning in her mid to late teens, Bauer competed and trained with the outstanding program at the Illinois Athletic Club (IAC) under Hall of Fame Coach William Bachrach. Among the outstanding swimmers with whom she trained at the IAC were Olympic champion Johnny Weissmuller and two-time 1924 Olympic freestyle gold medalist Ethel Lackie with whom she competed frequently. With complimentary skills in freestyle and backstroke, Lackie and Bauer dominated many national meets in the 1920s. At AAU competition in Chicago in 1922, while swimming for the (IAC), Bauer set backstroke records in the 100-yard open water event of 1:16 on August 27, and swam the 100-meter backstroke in 1:16.4 in indoor competition in a 25-meter pool on April 7. In the 150-yard event she swam another 1922 record of 2:06.2 on November 21.

During a 1922 meet in Bermuda, she became the first woman to break a men's record, finishing the 440-yard backstroke in a time of 6:24.4 (about four seconds ahead of the old mark). However, that record was unofficial, since it took place at an unsanctioned contest.

In 1924, one of her most outstanding years, prior to the Olympics on January 19, she eclipsed her own 75-yard backstroke record by five seconds and then broke her 100-yard backstroke record. On January 20, she outpaced her new 100-yard backstroke mark again, by more than two seconds. At a meet in Miami in February, Bauer broke backstroke records in seven different distances over a five-day period. She broke the 100-yard backstroke record once again at the AAU Central championships in March, and six days later subsequently shattered two more records in Chicago. In late March, Bauer claimed her fourth-straight National AAU championship in the 100-yard backstroke.

=== 1924 Paris Olympic gold ===
At the June, 1924 Olympic trials in Briarcliff Manor, New York, Bauer outswam nine competitors breaking the record in the 100-meter backstroke with a time of 1:22.6, which bettered her own record by over three seconds. She sailed to Europe on the America bound for Paris.

Bauer represented the United States at the 1924 Summer Olympics in Paris in mid-July, the first Olympics to include a women's backstroke event. As a heavy favorite, Bauer won the gold medal in the women's 100-meter backstroke. In the finals, she finished with a time of 1:23.2, another world record, and four seconds ahead of silver medalist Phyllis Harding. The Head Women's Coach for the 1924 Olympics was Louis Handley, former Olympian and coach for the Women's Swimming Association of New York, and the Head Men's Coach was her IAC Coach Bill Bachrach.

At the end of Olympic competition, she attended competitions in Brussels, Belgium and England and took a family visit to Norway, her ancestral home.

=== Northwestern University ===
She attended Northwestern University in nearby Evanston, Illinois from 1924 to 1926, swimming intramurals, though she died in her Senior year. Bauer was a sister of the Gamma Phi Beta Sorority. When she attended Northwestern, intercollegiate varsity women's sports teams did not yet exist for women. The Women's Athletic Association offered only intramural competition.

In an intramural meet at Northwestern, she helped the sophomore women's swimming team defeat the junior and senior team in the WAA interclass swimming competition. Not surprisingly, she won each of the races she swam, and broke Northwestern's Patten Gym record in a relay. While at Northwestern, she served on the student council, was president and active in the Women's Athletic Association, and in addition to swimming, participated in basketball and field hockey. She also participated with teams in baseball and golf. Prior to and during her time at Northwestern from 1921 to 1926, she set 23 world records in women's swimming, mostly in backstroke events.

=== Career highlights ===
In her career, from 1921 to 1926, Bauer won six consecutive National AAU 100-yard backstroke championships, and won the National Championships in the 100 meter, 150 yard, and 220 yard backstroke events. She also swam as part of a world record and national champion freestyle relay. Most notably, at one time she held all the records for the existing women's backstroke events.

== Post career ==
She retired from swimming competition in February 1926 after feeling poorly at a meet in St. Augustine, Florida. Her early death may have partly been precipitated by a fall from a touring car in the parade following her last championship in St. Augustine.

Bauer was engaged to future television host Ed Sullivan, a sports reporter at the time, and the couple were planning a June 1926 wedding, but she died of cancer during her senior year of college at the age of 23. Prior to her death, she spent three months at the Chicago area's Michael Reese hospital suffering from what was diagnosed as an intestinal infection. Services were held at Chicago's First Lutheran Church, and her funeral was well attended by members of her sorority Gamma Phi Beta. Pall Bearers included several local swimmers including Johnny Weissmuller and Bob Skelton (swimmer). She is buried at Mount Olive Cemetery in Chicago.

== Honors ==
She was inducted into the International Swimming Hall of Fame as an "Honor Swimmer" in 1967, and the Northwestern University Athletic Hall of Fame in 1984. Northwestern authorized a memorial tablet to honor her in February, 1927. The memorial was a bronze plaque on a wood background with an image of her in her Northwestern swimming suit, with an "N" emblazoned on the front, with the words "Daughters of Neptune", an organization of which she was a member, beneath.

== See also ==
- List of members of the International Swimming Hall of Fame
