= Renée Brasseur =

Luxembourgish swimmer

Personal information
- Born: 27 August 1902 Luxembourg City, Luxembourg
- Died: 26 June 1929 (aged 26) Luxembourg City, Luxembourg

Sport
- Sport: Swimming

Renée Brasseur (27 August 1902 – 26 June 1929) was a Luxembourgish swimmer. She competed in the women's 100 metre backstroke event at the 1924 Summer Olympics.
