= Marcel Dubuisson =

Belgian zoologist and academic

Marcel Georges Valère Céline Dubuisson (5 April 1903 – 25 October 1974) was a Belgian zoologist and professor at the University of Liège.

Dubuisson was born in Olsene, which is part of Zulte, in 1903. He married Adèle Brouha, the sister of medical researcher and University of Liège alumni Lucien Brouha. He was rector of the University of Liège from 1953 to 1971. He died in Liège in 1974 and was buried at the Cimetière de Robermont.
