= Marcel Lepan =

French coxswain

Personal information
- Nationality: French
- Born: 14 December 1909; Boulogne-sur-Mer, France
- Died: 10 March 1953 (aged 43); Boulogne-sur-Mer, France

Sport
- Sport: Rowing

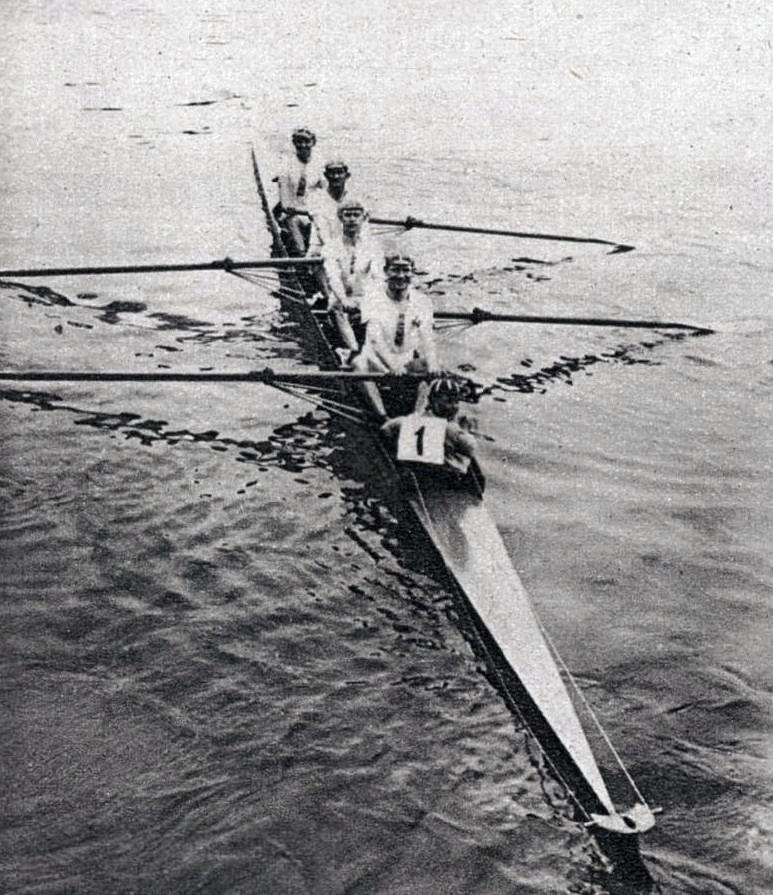
The 'Four' seniors of the Boulogne Emulation (Raymond Talleux, Eugène Constant, Louis Gressier and Georges Lecointe, helmsman Marcel Lepan), in June 1924, winner of the Pre-Olympic Regattas.

Marcel Lepan (14 December 1909 – 10 March 1953) was a French coxswain. He competed in two events at the 1924 Summer Olympics, winning a silver medal in the men's coxed four.
