= Swimming at the 1924 Summer Olympics – Women's 100 metre backstroke =

Women's 100 metre backstroke at the Games of the VIII Olympiad
- Venue: Piscine des Tourelles
- Date: 19 July 1924 (semifinals); 20 July 1924 (final)
- Competitors: 10 from 5 nations
- Winning time: 1:23.2 OR

Medalists
1st place, gold medalist(s)		Sybil Bauer	United States
2nd place, silver medalist(s)		Phyllis Harding	Great Britain
3rd place, bronze medalist(s)		Aileen Riggin	United States

The women's 100 metre backstroke was a swimming event held as part of the swimming at the 1924 Summer Olympics programme. It was the first appearance of the event, as women only swam freestyle events before this Games. The competition was held on Saturday 19 July 1924, and on Sunday 20 July 1924.

== Records ==
These were the standing world and Olympic records (in minutes) prior to the 1924 Summer Olympics.

World record	1:22.4	(United States) Sybil Bauer	Miami (USA)	6 January 1924
Olympic record	-	none	-	-

In the first heat Sybil Bauer set the first Olympic record with 1:24.0 minutes. In the final she bettered her own record to 1:23.2 minutes.

== Results ==
=== Semifinals ===
Saturday 19 July 1924: The fastest two in each semi-final and the faster of the two third-placed swimmer advanced to the final.

Semifinal 1

Place	Swimmer	Time	Qual.
1	Sybil Bauer (USA)	1:24.0	QQ OR
2	Phyllis Harding (GBR)	1:29.4	QQ
3	Florence Chambers (USA)	1:32.0	qq
4	Ellen King (GBR)	1:38.2	
5	Lucienne Rouet (FRA)	1:43.8	

Semifinal 2

Place	Swimmer	Time	Qual.
1	Aileen Riggin (USA)	1:29.6	QQ
2	Jarmila Müllerová (TCH)	1:37.0	QQ
3	Helen Boyle (GBR)	1:43.0	
4	Alice Stoffel (FRA)	1:44.0	
5	Renée Brasseur (LUX)	1:51.4	

=== Final ===
Sunday 20 July 1924:

Place	Swimmer	Time
1	Sybil Bauer (USA)	1:23.2 OR
2	Phyllis Harding (GBR)	1:27.4
3	Aileen Riggin (USA)	1:28.2
4	Florence Chambers (USA)	1:30.8
5	Jarmila Müllerová (TCH)	1:31.2
