= Sid Jelinek =

American rower (1899–1979)

Personal information
- Full name: Sydney Carter Jelinek
- Born: March 18, 1899 Wilmington, Delaware
- Died: March 9, 1979 (aged 79) Philadelphia, Pennsylvania
- Education: University of Pennsylvania, BS Architecture
- Occupation: Architect
- Spouse: Irma

Sport
- Club: Pennsylvania Barge Club
Medal record
Men's rowing
Bronze medal – third place	1924 Paris	Coxed four

Sidney Carter Jelinek (March 18, 1899 – March 9, 1979) was an American architect who worked primarily in Philadelphia. As a competitive rower in his youth, he rowed eight man shells for the University of Pennsylvania, and won a bronze medal in the coxed fours crew at the 1924 Summer Olympics in Paris.

== Early life ==
Jelinek was born in Wilmington, Delaware, the son of Emmanuel and Mary (Klein) Jelinek. He graduated from Central High School in Philadelphia in 1917. He got his start rowing on the lightweight crew for the University of Pennsylvania in 1920, but moving to varsity in the following year, he competed for the Penn eight-man crew in the seventh seat for his remaining three years of collegiate competition. Showing versatility in his athleticism, he was also a member of the Penn water polo team. Jelinek rowed for Philadelphia's fabled Pennsylvania Barge Club, which was founded in 1861 and had produced 22 Olympians by 1932. He graduated from the University of Pennsylvania in 1923 with a Bachelors of Architecture degree and worked as an architect in his hometown of Philadelphia.

Demonstrating academic achievement in architecture, in June 1924 he received the Historic Ornament Medal for his first semester of that year from the University of Pennsylvania School of Fine Arts.

== Olympics ==
At the 1924 Olympic Trials, his Penn eight rowing crew failed to defeat Yale for the Olympic berth, but Jelinek made the team in the fours while rowing for the Bachelor's Barge Club. In that qualifying round, four other members of the Bachelor's Barge Club rowed with Jelenek on Philadelphia's Schuykill River on June 13, 1924. Rowing on a cool, rainy day, with the river calm, the Bachelor's made a spurt from third place near the end of the race to finish first near Peter's Island. Jelinek rowed in the important 4th position in the back of the boat, with coxswain Tom Kennedy behind him.

After their arrival in Paris, the American coxed four team from the Philadelphia area won their heat in the preliminary round with a time of 7 minutes 19 seconds for the 1.24 mile course. In the final round, the Americans won the bronze medal in the coxed four event in Paris France. The competition, the fourth appearance of the event, was held from July 13–17, 1924 on the river Seine. There were 10 boats (51 competitors, with Switzerland making one substitution) from 10 nations, with each nation limited to a single boat in the event. The competition was won by Switzerland, the nation's second consecutive victory in the event, with France taking the Silver medal.

Coxed Four shell configuration, w/coxswain in yellow

As shown at left, the coxed four event featured five-person boats, with four rowers and a coxswain shown as a yellow dot. It was a sweep rowing event, with the rowers each having one oar and each rowing on one side. The competition used the 2000 metres (1.24 miles) distance that became standard at the 1912 Olympics and which has been used ever since. The Americans finished with a time of 7:23, only two and a half seconds behind France who took the bronze. Switzerland, the pre-race favorite, finished with a sizable three-minute lead over second place France. Bob Gerhardt took the important position of bowsmen rowing in the front, Jelinek rowed in seat two, Edward Mitchell Jr. rowed third, Henry Welsford rowed fourth (last) or Sweep, and John Kennedy functioned as coxswain.

== Architecture ==
After completing his architectural degree at Penn, Jelinek designed factories, office buildings, several recreation centers, theatres and apartments in Philadelphia, establishing his own office in 1945. He served as an assistant in architecture at the University of Pennsylvania from 1920 to 1922. As a noted urban architect, he later served on the Philadelphia City Planning Commission from 1933 to 1934.

From 1924 to 1932 he was employed by William H. Lee; from 1934 to 1937 he was in the office of Simon & Simon; and from 1944 to 1946 he worked for Thalheimer & Weitz. While he did not formally establish his own office in Philadelphia until 1942, Jelinek is listed as the architect on building permits for several properties in the Philadelphia area as early as 1926. After a long career, he retired from practice in 1976.

His work included drafting the plans for the Montgomery Court Apartments late in 1938 with co-designer William H. Lee, as well as drafting alterations to the Bell Theatre on South 31st Street in 1940. In a larger project, he created plans for a 3 million dollar Aquarama at 34 South Broad Street, a South Philadelphia landmark, which replaced the old city-operated aquarium, and had grounds spanning 10 acres. A 1,200 seat "Theatre of the Sea" was included in its modernistic layout, which featured trained porpoise shows. At the time, the broad scope of the project was paralleled only by Seaquarium in Miami, Florida, and Marineland in San Diego. In 1960, he was also a primary architect for the 300 room Franklin Motor Inn on the Parkway at 22nd Street with his associate Edward B. Todd, and in 1967, he completed plans for "Theatre 1812" on Chestnut Street.

In a late life marriage at 63, in September 1962, Jelinek married Irma Sporkin, 57. Jelinek was living at St. James Place in Philadelphia.

He died March 9, 1979, in Philadelphia, having most recently resided at the Wellington Apartments at 19th and Walnut, and was survived by his wife Irma, and one son. Memorial services were held on March 11 at Philadelphia's Congregation Rodeph Shalom.
