= Gastone Cerato =

Italian rower (1900–1999)

Personal information
- Nationality: Italian
- Born: 30 September 1900; Venice, Kingdom of Italy
- Died: 29 April 1999; Venice, Italy

Sport
- Sport: Rowing

Gastone Cerato (30 September 1900 – 29 April 1999) was an Italian rower. He competed in the men's coxed four event at the 1924 Summer Olympics giving Italy 4th place.
