= Józef Szawara =

Polish rower

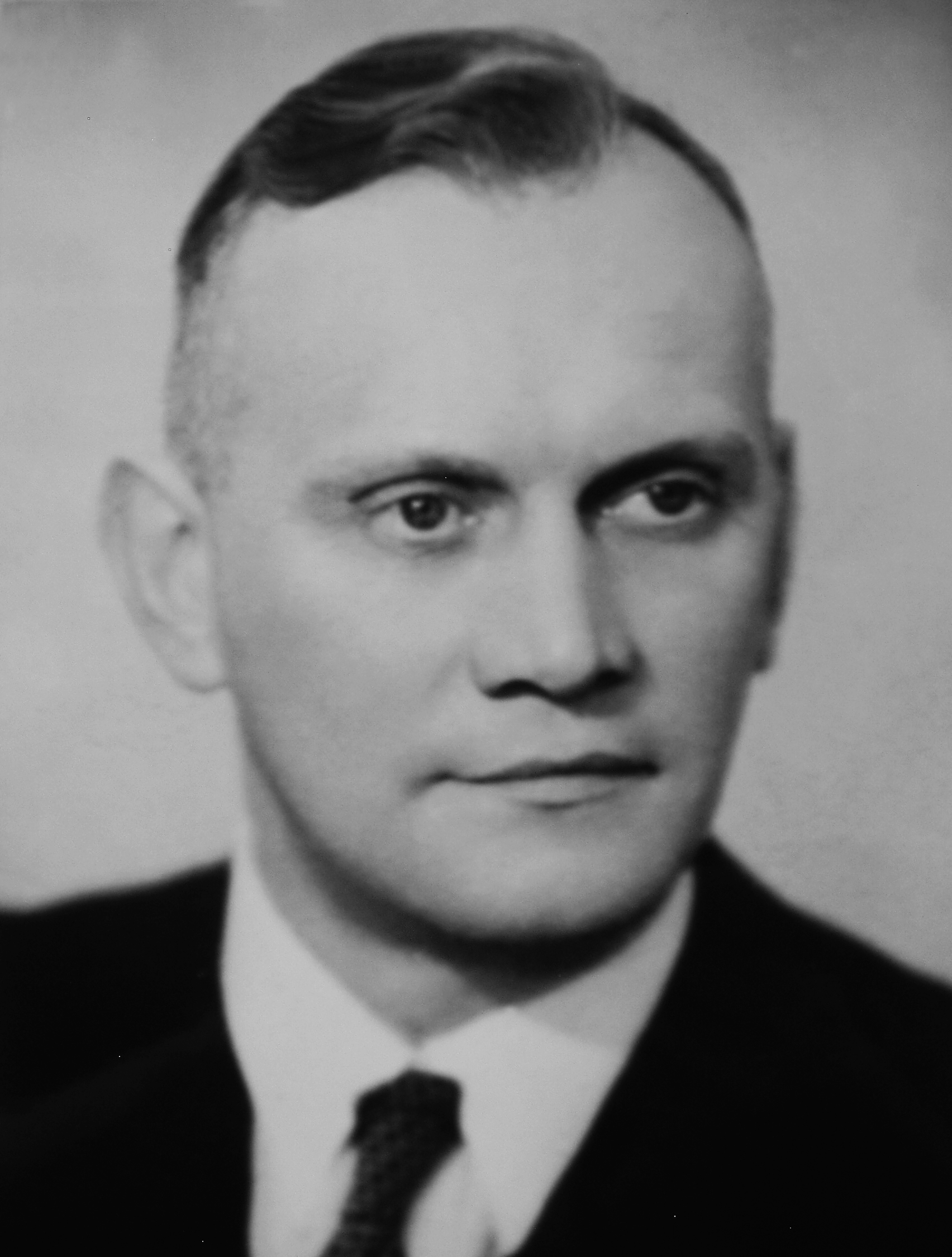

Personal information
- Full name: Józef Franciszek Szawara
- Nationality: Polish
- Born: 1902 Mińsk Mazowiecki, Poland
- Died: 5 August 1944 (aged 41–42) Warsaw, Poland

Sport
- Sport: Rowing

Józef Franciszek Szawara (1902 – 5 August 1944) was a Polish rower. He competed in the men's coxed four event at the 1924 Summer Olympics. He was killed during the Warsaw Uprising (Ochota massacre).
