= Massimo Ballestrero =

Italian coxswain

Personal information
- Full name: Erasmo Massimo Ballestrero
- Nationality: Italian
- Born: 4 May 1901 Genoa, Kingdom of Italy

Sport
- Sport: Rowing

Massimo Ballestrero (born 4 May 1901, date of death unknown) was an Italian rowing coxswain. He competed in the men's coxed four event at the 1924 Summer Olympics.
