= István Szendeffy =

Hungarian rower

Personal information
- Nationality: Hungarian
- Born: 29 November 1899; Budapest, Austria-Hungary
- Died: 21 August 1985 (aged 85)

Sport
- Sport: Rowing

István Szendeffy (29 November 1899 – 21 August 1985) was a Hungarian rower. He competed in the men's coxed four event at the 1924 Summer Olympics.
