= Louis Gressier =

French rower

Olympic medal record

Men's rowing
Silver medal – second place	1924 Paris	Coxed four

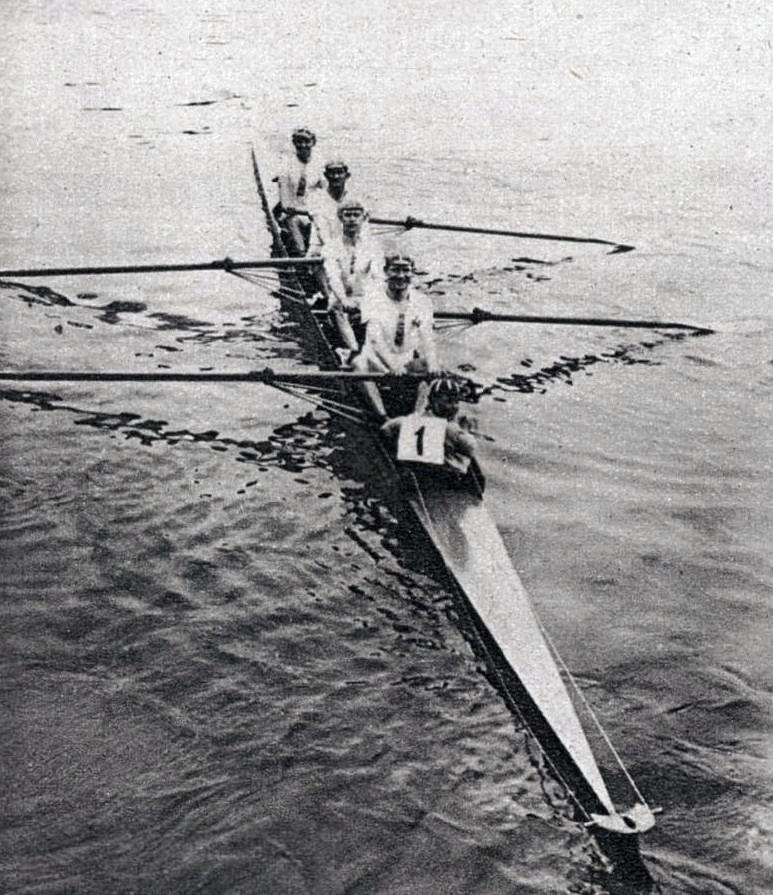
The 'Four' seniors of the Émulation de Boulogne (Raymond Talleux, Eugène Constant, Louis Gressier and Georges Lecointe, helmsman Marcel Lepan), in June 1924, winner of the Pre-Olympic Regatta.jpg

Louis Auguste Gressier (12 May 1897 – 14 January 1959) was a French rower who competed in the 1924 Summer Olympics. He won the silver medal in the men's coxed four event.
