= Edmund Kowalec =

Polish rower (1900 - 1944)

Personal information
- Nationality: Polish
- Born: 1900
- Died: 12 April 1944 (aged 43–44)

Sport
- Sport: Rowing

Edmund Kowalec (1900 – 12 April 1944) was a Polish rower. He competed in the men's coxed four event at the 1924 Summer Olympics.
