= Rowing at the 1924 Summer Olympics – Men's coxed four =

Men's coxed four at the Games of the VIII Olympiad
- Rowing pictogram
- Venue: Argenteuil Basin, Seine
- Dates: 13–17 July 1924
- Competitors: 51 from 10 nations
- Winning time: 7:18.4

Medalists
1st place, gold medalist(s)		Switzerland: Émile Albrecht; Alfred Probst; Eugen Sigg; Hans Walter; Émile Lachapelle (cox); Walter Loosli (cox)
2nd place, silver medalist(s)		France: Eugène Constant; Louis Gressier; Georges Lecointe; Raymond Talleux; Marcel Lepan (cox)
3rd place, bronze medalist(s)		United States: Bob Gerhardt; Sid Jelinek; Ed Mitchell; Henry Welsford; John Kennedy (cox)

The men's coxed four event was part of the rowing programme at the 1924 Summer Olympics. The competition, the fourth appearance of the event, was held from 13 to 17 July 1924 on the river Seine. There were 10 boats (51 competitors, with Switzerland making one substitution) from 10 nations, with each nation limited to a single boat in the event. The event was won by Switzerland, the nation's second consecutive victory in the event; the two Swiss victories matched Germany for most among nations to that point. France earned its first medal in the event since 1900 with silver. The United States reached the podium for the second straight Games with a bronze medal. Hans Walter, a member of the Swiss crew in 1920 as well as this year, was the first man to win two medals in the event, and the only one to win two golds.

== Background ==
This was the fourth appearance of the event. Rowing had been on the programme in 1896 but was cancelled due to bad weather. The coxed four was one of the four initial events introduced in 1900. It was not held in 1904 or 1908, but was held at every Games from 1912 to 1992 when it (along with the men's coxed pair) was replaced with the men's lightweight double sculls and men's lightweight coxless four.

Ten teams, each from a different nation, competed. Norway and Czechoslovakia were also nominated but they did not start. Switzerland was the favourite, having won every edition of the European Championships since 1911 except for 1922 when the French team had the upper hand; Switzerland came second that year. The Swiss were the reigning Olympic champions as well. Also returning from the 1920 Games were the silver-medal Americans and the seventh-place Belgians. Hans Walter, of Switzerland, was the only returning individual.

Hungary, Italy, and Poland each made their debut in the event. Belgium and France each made their third appearance, tied for most among nations to that point.

== Competition format ==
The coxed four event featured five-person boats, with four rowers and a coxswain. It was a sweep rowing event, with the rowers each having one oar (and thus each rowing on one side). The competition used the 2000 metres distance that became standard at the 1912 Olympics and which has been used ever since except at the 1948 Games.

The tournament featured three rounds of competition: semifinals, a repechage, and a final.

- The semifinals had four heats, with 2 or 3 boats in each heat. The winner of each semifinal advanced to the final, the second-place boat went to the repechage, and the third-place boats (where applicable) were eliminated.
- The repechage had a single heat with 4 boats. The winner joined the semifinal winners in the final.
- There was a single final, with five boats, to determine the medals.

== Schedule ==
Date	Time	Round
Sunday, 13 July 1924		Semifinals; Repechage
Thursday, 17 July 1924		Final

== Results ==
There are contradictory sources regarding the Swiss coxswain. The official Olympic record lists Walter Loosli as having coxed the team in all their three races. Other Olympic results lists show Émile Lachapelle as the Swiss cox. This page reflects how the results are displayed by the Sports Reference database, where Loosli is shown to have competed on the day of the heats and repechage, and replaced by Lachapelle in the final.

=== Semifinals ===
Four heats were rowed on 13 July. The top team from each heat would qualify for the final, with the second placed boat going into the repechage. The third placed boats, in the two heats with three boats, were eliminated.

==== Semifinal 1 ====
Rank	Rowers	Coxswain	Nation	Time	Notes
1	Bob Gerhardt; Sid Jelinek; Ed Mitchell; Henry Welsford	John Kennedy	United States	7:19.0	Q
2	Lucien Brouha; Victor Denis; Jules George; Marcel Roman		Belgium	7:29.0	R
3	Leandro Coll; Jaime Giralt; Ricardo Massana; Luis Omedes	Josep Balsells	Spain	7:34.0	

==== Semifinal 2 ====
Rank	Rowers	Coxswain	Nation	Time	Notes
1	Eugène Constant; Louis Gressier; Georges Lecointe; Raymond Talleux	Marcel Lepan	France	7:10.0	Q
2	Vincent Boveington; Bernard Croucher; Thomas Monk; John Townend	Harry Barnsley	Great Britain	7:21.6	R
3	Henryk Fronczak; Edmund Kowalec; Józef Szawara; Władysław Nadratowski	Antoni Brzozowski	Poland	Unknown	

==== Semifinal 3 ====
Rank	Rowers	Coxswain	Nation	Time	Notes
1	Renato Berninzone; Marcello Casanova; Gastone Cerato; Jean Cipollina	Massimo Ballestrero	Italy	7:13.0	Q
2	Sándor Hautzinger; István Szendeffy; Zoltán Török; Lajos Wick	Károly Koch	Hungary	7:13.8	R

==== Semifinal 4 ====
In heat 4, the Dutch team beat the favourites from Switzerland in the two-boat-race. Switzerland, with Loosli as their coxswain, went to the repechage.

Rank	Rowers	Coxswain	Nation	Time	Notes
1	Jacob Brandsma; Jo Brandsma; Dirk Fortuin; Jean Van Silfhout	Louis Dekker	Netherlands	7:08.0	Q
2	Émile Albrecht; Alfred Probst; Eugen Sigg; Hans Walter	Walter Loosli	Switzerland	7:12.2	R

=== Repechage ===
The repechage was held on the same day as the heats. The top boat advanced to the final, with the other three eliminated. Hungary finished a metre behind, while Belgium was a length behind.

Rank	Rowers	Coxswain	Nation	Time	Notes
1	Émile Albrecht; Alfred Probst; Eugen Sigg; Hans Walter	Walter Loosli	Switzerland	7:27.2	Q
2	Vincent Boveington; Bernard Croucher; Thomas Monk; John Townend	Harry Barnsley	Great Britain	7:33.0	
3	Sándor Hautzinger; István Szendeffy; Zoltán Török; Lajos Wick	Károly Koch	Hungary	Unknown	
4	Lucien Brouha; Victor Denis; Jules George; Marcel Roman		Belgium	Unknown	

=== Final ===
The final was rowed on 17 July. The Dutch team led the race for the first half but then dropped out of the race through exhaustion and did not finish the race. The Swiss team took the gold, followed by France and the United States. The American time is not recorded, but they finished two metres behind.

Rank	Rowers	Coxswain	Nation	Time
1st place, gold medalist(s)	Émile Albrecht; Alfred Probst; Eugen Sigg; Hans Walter	Émile Lachapelle	Switzerland	7:18.4
2nd place, silver medalist(s)	Eugène Constant; Louis Gressier; Georges Lecointe; Raymond Talleux	Marcel Lepan	France	7:21.6
3rd place, bronze medalist(s)	Bob Gerhardt; Sid Jelinek; Ed Mitchell; Henry Welsford	John Kennedy	United States	Unknown
4	Renato Berninzone; Marcello Casanova; Gastone Cerato; Jean Cipollina	Massimo Ballestrero	Italy	Unknown
—	Jacob Brandsma; Jo Brandsma; Dirk Fortuin; Jean Van Silfhout	Louis Dekker	Netherlands	DNF
