= Władysław Nadratowski =

Polish rower

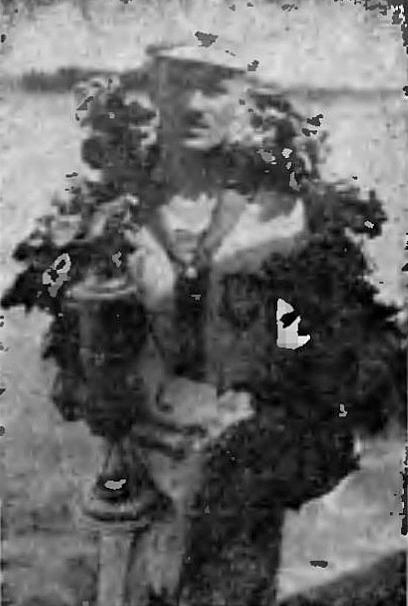
- Władysław Nadratowski in 1924

Personal information
- Full name: Władysław Kajetan Nadratowski
- Nationality: Polish
- Born: 27 July 1892 Czermin, Austria-Hungary
- Died: 21 April 1985 (aged 92) London, England

Sport
- Sport: Rowing

Władysław Kajetan Nadratowski (27 June 1892 – 21 April 1985) was a Polish rower. He competed in the men's coxed four event at the 1924 Summer Olympics.
