= Maurice Brouha =

Belgian gynecologist (1875–1948)

- Born: Maurice Nicolas Désiré Brouha; 8 May 1875; Liège, Belgium
- Died: 29 January 1948 (aged 72)
- Occupations: gynaecologist, obstetrician, academic
- Employer: University of Liège
- Known for: research in obstetrics and gynaecology; founding of Liège médical
- Children: Lucien Brouha; Adèle Brouha; Paul Brouha

Maurice Nicolas Désiré Brouha (8 May 1875 – 29 January 1948) was a Belgian gynaecologist.

== Biography ==
Brouha was born in Liège on 8 May 1875. Aged 22, he graduated as a physician. He received his education and training from the zoologist Pierre-Joseph van Beneden and the anatomist and embryologist Auguste Swaen. For his studies of the embryological development of the liver and pancreas, he received scholarships that saw him travel to Germany, Switzerland, and France. He then focused on obstetrics and gynaecology and became an assistant to the paleontologist Julien Fraipont in 1899. He was appointed as deputy director of the School of Midwifery, which in 1908 was incorporated into the University of Liège. In 1925, he was appointed as professor. He became one of the leading gynaecologists in Europe. He was president of the Belgian Society of Obstetrics and Gynecology on three occasions; no-one else had held the presidency three times before him. He founded the journal Liège médical. In 1945, he reached retirement age and became professor emeritus, and the reduced level of responsibility created a void in his life.

In 1928, he became a corresponding member of the Royal Academy of Medicine of Belgium and was made a full member in 1941. Shortly afterwards, he became a corresponding member of the Académie Nationale de Médecine, the equivalent institution in France. He was conferred honorary doctorates from the University of Toulouse and the University of Bordeaux.

Two of the Brouha children worked in endocrinology after their medical studies; both his son Lucien Brouha and his daughter Adèle successfully developed biological pregnancy tests before their careers turned to different scientific areas. His son Paul, a lawyer, was executed during the German occupation of Liège in 1943. Maurice Brouha met accidental death on 29 January 1948.
