= Roger Flanders =

American wrestler

Personal information
- Born: February 3, 1901 Lancaster, New Hampshire, U.S.
- Died: July 8, 1965 (aged 64) Oklahoma City, Oklahoma, U.S.

Sport
- Country: United States
- Sport: Wrestling
- Event: Freestyle
- College team: Norwich
- Team: USA

Roger Flanders (February 3, 1901 – July 8, 1965) was an American wrestler. He competed in the freestyle heavyweight event at the 1924 Summer Olympics.
