= Jo Brandsma =

Dutch rower (1900–1973)

Personal information
- Born: Johannes Adrianus Brandsma; 15 November 1900 Amsterdam, Netherlands
- Died: 23 January 1973 (aged 72)
- Relatives: Jacob Brandsma (brother)

Sport
- Sport: Rowing
- Club: De Amstel, Amsterdam
Medal record
Men's rowing
Representing the Netherlands
European Rowing Championships
Gold medal – first place	1924 Zürich	Coxed four
Bronze medal – third place	1927 Como	Coxed pair

Johannes Adrianus Brandsma (15 November 1900 – 23 January 1973) was a Dutch rower. He competed at the 1924 Summer Olympics in Paris with the men's coxed four where they did not start in the final round.
