= John Kennedy (rowing) =

American coxswain (1900–1971)

Personal information
- Full name: John Gendell Kennedy
- Born: May 19, 1900 Philadelphia, Pennsylvania
- Died: January 9, 1971 (aged 70) Lakewood, Colorado
- Education: University of Pennsylvania

Sport
- Club: Pennsylvania Barge Club
Medal record
Men's rowing
Bronze medal – third place	1924 Paris	Coxed four

John Gendell Kennedy (May 19, 1900 – September 1971) was an American radio technician who as a coxswain of a rowing shell competed in the 1924 Summer Olympics in Paris. The American coxed four team coxed by Kennedy won the bronze medal in the coxed four event.

== Biography ==
Taking his position at the rear of the boat, John Kennedy coxed the four members of the Bachelor’s Barge rowing club which won the qualifier for the 1924 Olympics in Paris with four other members of the Bachelor's Barge Club on Philadelphia's Schuykill River on June 13, 1924 Before joining Bachelor’s, he attended the University of Pennsylvania and coxed their lightweight and junior varsity crews. Kennedy enlisted in the US Army right at the end of World War I, just after turning 18-years-old, but was discharged two months later when the war ended. He later worked as a radio technician in a department store.

== Olympics ==
After their arrival in Paris, the American coxed four team won their heat in the preliminary round with a time of 7 minutes 19 seconds for the 1.24 mile course. In the final round, the Americans won the bronze medal in the coxed four event. The competition, the fourth appearance of the event, was held from July 13–17, 1924 on the river Seine. There were 10 boats (51 competitors, with Switzerland making one substitution) from 10 nations, with each nation limited to a single boat in the event. The competition was won by Switzerland, the nation's second consecutive victory in the event, with France taking the Silver medal.

Coxed Four shell configuration, w/coxswain in yellow

As shown at left, the coxed four event featured five-person boats, with four rowers and a coxswain shown as a yellow dot. It was a sweep rowing event, with the rowers each having one oar and each rowing on one side. The competition used the 2000 metres (1.24 miles) distance that became standard at the 1912 Olympics and which has been used ever since. The Americans finished with a time of 7:23, only two and a half seconds behind France who took the bronze. Switzerland, the pre-race favorite, finished with a sizable three-minute lead over second place France. Bob Gerhardt took the position of bowsmen in the front, Sid Jelinek rowed in seat two, Edward Mitchell Jr. rowed third, Henry Welsford rowed fourth (last) or Sweep, and John Kennedy functioned as coxswain.

Kennedy died on January 9, 1971, in Lakewood, Colorado.
