= Hans Roth (wrestler) =

Swiss wrestler

- Born: 6 August 1903
- Died: 7 November 1964 (aged 61); Bern, Switzerland

Hans Roth (6 August 1903 – 7 November 1964) was a Swiss wrestler. He competed in the freestyle heavyweight event at the 1924 Summer Olympics.
