= Jean Cipollina =

Italian rower

Personal information
- Born: 20 June 1903 Genoa, Italy
- Died: 3 May 1981 (aged 77) Genoa, Italy

Sport
- Sport: Rowing
Medal record
Men's rowing
Representing Italy
European Rowing Championships
Silver medal – second place	1926 Lucerne	Coxless pair

Jean Cipollina (20 June 1903 – 3 May 1981) was an Italian rower. He competed at the 1924 Summer Olympics in Paris with the men's coxed four where they came fourth.
