= Walter Loosli (rowing) =

Swiss rowing cox

Personal information
- Born: 1901
- Died: unknown

Sport
- Sport: Rowing
- Club: RC Lausanne
Medal record
Men's rowing
Representing Switzerland
Olympic Games
Gold medal – first place	1924 Paris	Coxed four

Walter Loosli (1901–?) was a Swiss coxswain. He competed at the 1924 Summer Olympics in Paris with the men's coxed four. In the official Olympic record and the FISA database, he coxed all three races. According to the Sports Reference database, Loosli coxed the first heat and the repechage only and was replaced in the final by Émile Lachapelle. The Swiss team won the final.
