= Louis Dekker =

Dutch coxswain

Personal information
- Born: Louis Florian Dekker; 4 July 1894 Amsterdam, Netherlands
- Died: 13 May 1973 (aged 78) Amsterdam, Netherlands

Sport
- Sport: Rowing
- Club: De Amstel, Amsterdam
Medal record
Men's rowing
Representing the Netherlands
European Rowing Championships
Gold medal – first place	1924 Zürich	Coxed four

Louis Florian Dekker (4 July 1894 – 13 May 1973) was a Dutch coxswain. He competed at the 1924 Summer Olympics in Paris with the men's coxed four where they did not finish in the final round.
