= Marcello Casanova =

Italian rower (1901–1981)

Personal information
- Full name: Marcello Giuseppe Lauro Angelo Michele Casanova
- Nationality: Italian
- Born: 30 September 1901; Genoa, Kingdom of Italy
- Died: 3 August 1981 (aged 79); Genoa, Italy

Sport
- Sport: Rowing

Marcello Casanova (30 September 1901 – 3 August 1981) was an Italian rower. He competed in the men's coxed four event at the 1924 Summer Olympics.
