= Renato Berninzone =

Italian rower (1903–1975)

Personal information
- Full name: Renato Enrico Mario Raffaele Berninzone
- Nationality: Italian
- Born: 31 May 1903; Genoa, Kingdom of Italy
- Died: 13 January 1975 (aged 71); Genoa, Italy

Sport
- Sport: Rowing

Renato Berninzone (31 May 1903 – 13 January 1975) was an Italian rower. He competed in the men's coxed four event at the 1924 Summer Olympics.
