= Jacob Brandsma =

Dutch rower (1898–1976)

Personal information
- Born: 16 August 1898 Amsterdam, Netherlands
- Died: 16 May 1976 (aged 77) Amsterdam, Netherlands
- Relatives: Jo Brandsma (brother)

Sport
- Sport: Rowing
Medal record
Men's rowing
Representing the Netherlands
European Rowing Championships
Gold medal – first place	1924 Zürich	Coxed four
Silver medal – second place	1925 Prague	Coxless four

Jacob Brandsma (16 August 1898 – 16 May 1976) was a Dutch rower. He competed at the 1924 Summer Olympics in Paris with the men's coxed four where they did not start in the final round.
