= Jean van Silfhout (sportsman) =

Dutch sportsman (1902–1956)

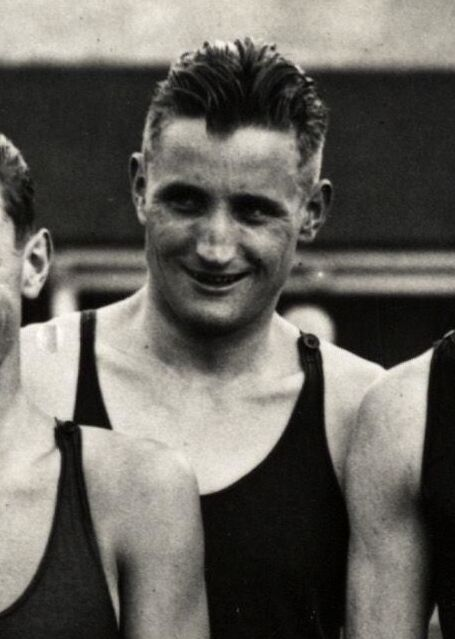
- Van Silfhout in 1927

Personal information
- Born: 4 February 1902 Sloten, Netherlands
- Died: 1956 (aged 53–54) Jakarta, Indonesia

Sport
- Sport: Rowing, swimming
Medal record
Men's rowing
Representing the Netherlands
European Rowing Championships
Gold medal – first place	1924 Zürich	Coxed four
Silver medal – second place	1925 Prague	Coxless pair
Silver medal – second place	1925 Prague	Coxless four

Jean-Baptiste van Silfhout (4 February 1902 – 1956) was a Dutch sportsman. He competed in swimming (100 metre freestyle) and water polo at the 1920 Summer Olympics, rowing (coxed four) at the 1924 Summer Olympics, and water polo at the 1928 Summer Olympics. He finished fifth in the water polo event at both the 1920 and 1928 Olympics.
