= Jarmila Müllerová =

Czech swimmer

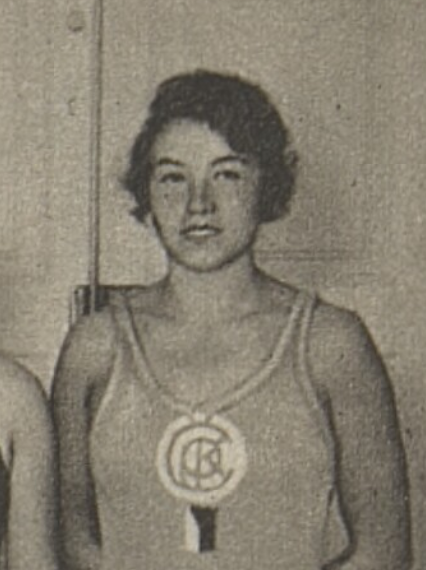

Personal information
- Born: February 24, 1901 České Budějovice, Austria-Hungary
- Died: April 24, 1944 (aged 43) Prague, Protectorate of Bohemia and Moravia

Sport
- Sport: Swimming

Jarmila Müllerová (later Suková, 24 February 1901 – 24 April 1944) was a Czech backstroke swimmer who competed for Czechoslovakia in the 1924 Summer Olympics. She was born in České Budějovice and died in Prague. In 1924 she finished fifth in the 100 metre backstroke event.
