= Henry Welsford =

American rower

Personal information
- Full name: Henry Reed Welsford
- Born: June 14, 1900 Pittston, Pennsylvania
- Died: April 9, 1974 (aged 73) Pittsburgh, Pennsylvania
- Height: 179 cm (5 ft 10 in)
- Spouse: Marion Garson
- Children: 2 daughters

Sport
- Club: Pennsylvania Barge Club, Philadelphia
Medal record
Men's rowing
| Bronze medal – third place | 1924 Paris | Coxed four |

Henry Reed Welsford (June 14, 1900 – April 9, 1974) was an American Sanitary Engineer who as a young rower competed in the 1924 Summer Olympics in Paris. In 1924 he won the bronze medal as a member of the American boat in the coxed four event.

Henry Welsford started rowing on the plebe crew at the U.S. Naval Academy in 1920, although he left school before graduating. He then joined the Malta Boat Club in 1921 and rowed for them until 1924 when he was recruited by the Bachelor’s Barge Club to make up a four-oared shell for the 1924 Olympic Trials.

== Olympics ==
In the Olympic qualifying round, Welsford rowed with four other members of the Bachelor's Barge Club using coxed fours with John Kennedy as coxswain, and Ed Mitchel at the bow, on Philadelphia's Schuylkill River on June 13, 1924. The 1.24 mile qualifying race finished near Peter's Island on the Schuylkill, in a time that qualified Welsford's group of five for the 1924 Olympics.

After their arrival in Paris, the American coxed fours team including Welsford won their heat in the preliminary round with a time of 7 minutes 19 seconds for the 1.24 mile course on the Seine. In the final round, the American coxed four team won the bronze medal in the coxed four event. The competition, the fourth appearance of the event, was held from July 13–17, 1924 on the river Seine. There were 10 boats (51 competitors, with Switzerland making one substitution) from 10 nations, with each nation limited to a single boat in the event. The competition was won by Switzerland, the nation's second consecutive victory in the event, with France taking the Silver medal.

Coxed Four shell configuration, w/coxswain in yellow

As shown at left, the coxed four event featured five-person boats, with four rowers and a coxswain shown as a yellow dot. It was a sweep rowing event, with the rowers each having one oar and each rowing on one side. The competition used the 2000 metres (1.24 miles) distance that became standard at the 1912 Olympics and which has been used ever since. The Americans finished with a time of 7:23, only two and a half seconds behind France who took the bronze. Switzerland, the pre-race favorite, finished with a sizable three-minute lead over second place France. Bob Gerhardt took the position of bowsmen in the front, Sid Jelinek rowed in seat two, Ed Mitchell Jr. rowed third, Henry Welsford rowed fourth (last) or Sweep, and John Kennedy functioned as coxswain.

=== Sanitary engineer ===
Welsford retired from the Philadelphia Water department in 1962 after 27 years of service. He had also worked as a Sanitary Engineer with the U. S. Public Health Service and the Pennsylvania Department of Public Health.

=== Olympic committee ===
In 1963, he served as a rowing coach at Drexel University. From 1954 to 1962, he was a member of the Philadelphia Olympic Executive Committee.

He died on Tuesday, April 9, at his home on Herbert Street in Philadelphia. He served as a Lieutenant Commander in the Navy during WWII. He was a member of the Schuylkill Navy, the Naval Academy Alumni Association, and St. John's Corinthian Commandery. He was survived by a wife, Marion Garson, two daughters, three grandchildren and a brother. He was buried in Westminster Cemetery in Philadelphia.
