= Georges Lecointe (rower) =

French rower (1897–1932)

Olympic medal record

Men's rowing
Silver medal – second place	1924 Paris	Coxed four

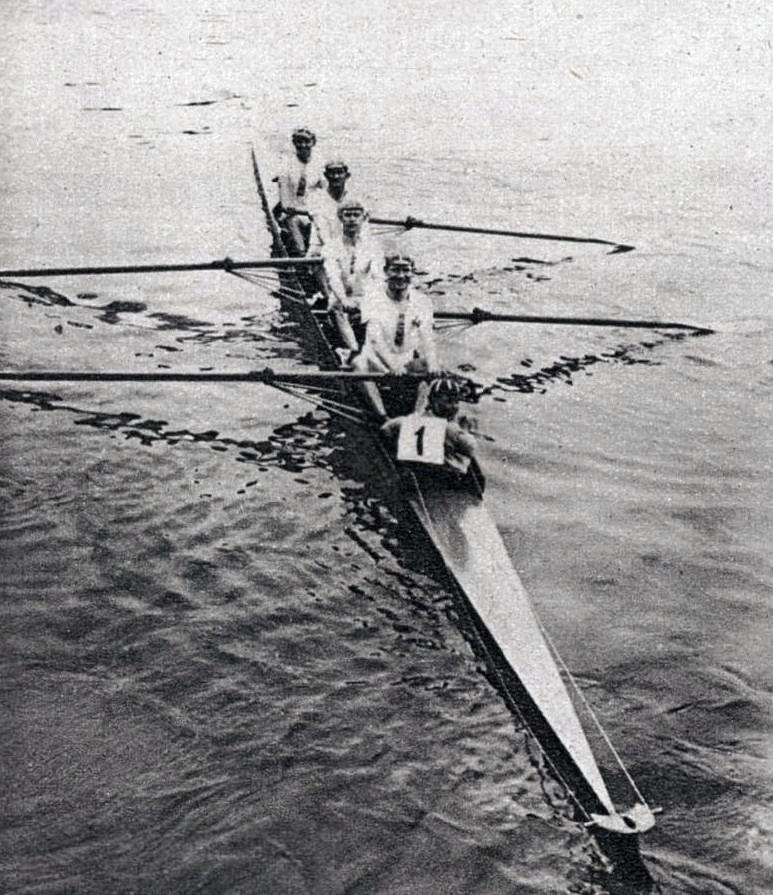
The 'Four' seniors of the Boulogne Emulation (Raymond Talleux, Eugène Constant, Louis Gressier and Georges Lecointe, helmsman Marcel Lepan), in June 1924, winner of the Pre-Olympic Regattas.

Georges Marcel Lecointe (6 August 1897 – 4 January 1932) was a French rower who competed in the 1924 Summer Olympics. In 1924 he won the silver medal as member of the French boat in the coxed four event.
