= Ted Cremer (rowing) =

Dutch rower

Personal information
- Born: Jacob Thedoor Cremer; 1 April 1902 Haarlem, Netherlands
- Died: 26 August 1979 (aged 77) New York, United States

Sport
- Sport: Rowing
- Club: Nereus Rowing Club
Medal record
Men's rowing
Representing the Netherlands
European Rowing Championships
Gold medal – first place	1924 Zürich	Eight

Jacob Thedoor Cremer (1 April 1902 – 26 August 1979) was a Dutch coxswain. He competed at the 1924 Summer Olympics in Paris with the men's eight where they were eliminated in round one.
