= Antoni Brzozowski =

Polish coxswain

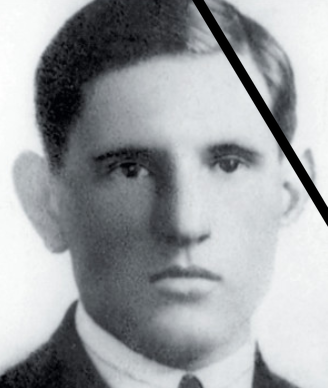

Personal information
- Nationality: Polish
- Born: 11 December 1900 Warsaw, Russian Empire
- Died: 19 August 1957 (aged 56) Warsaw, Poland

Sport
- Sport: Rowing

Antoni Brzozowski (11 December 1900 – 19 August 1957) was a Polish rowing coxswain. He competed in the men's coxed four event at the 1924 Summer Olympics.
