= John Townend (rower) =

British rower (1903–1926)

Personal information
- Full name: John Herman Townend
- Nationality: British
- Born: 6 September 1903
- Died: 2 August 1926 (aged 22) Chertsey, Surrey, England

Sport
- Sport: Rowing

John Herman Townend (6 September 1903 – 2 August 1926) was a British rower. He competed in the men's coxed four event at the 1924 Summer Olympics. He was killed when he fell from the top of an omnibus.
