= Lucienne Rouet =

French swimmer

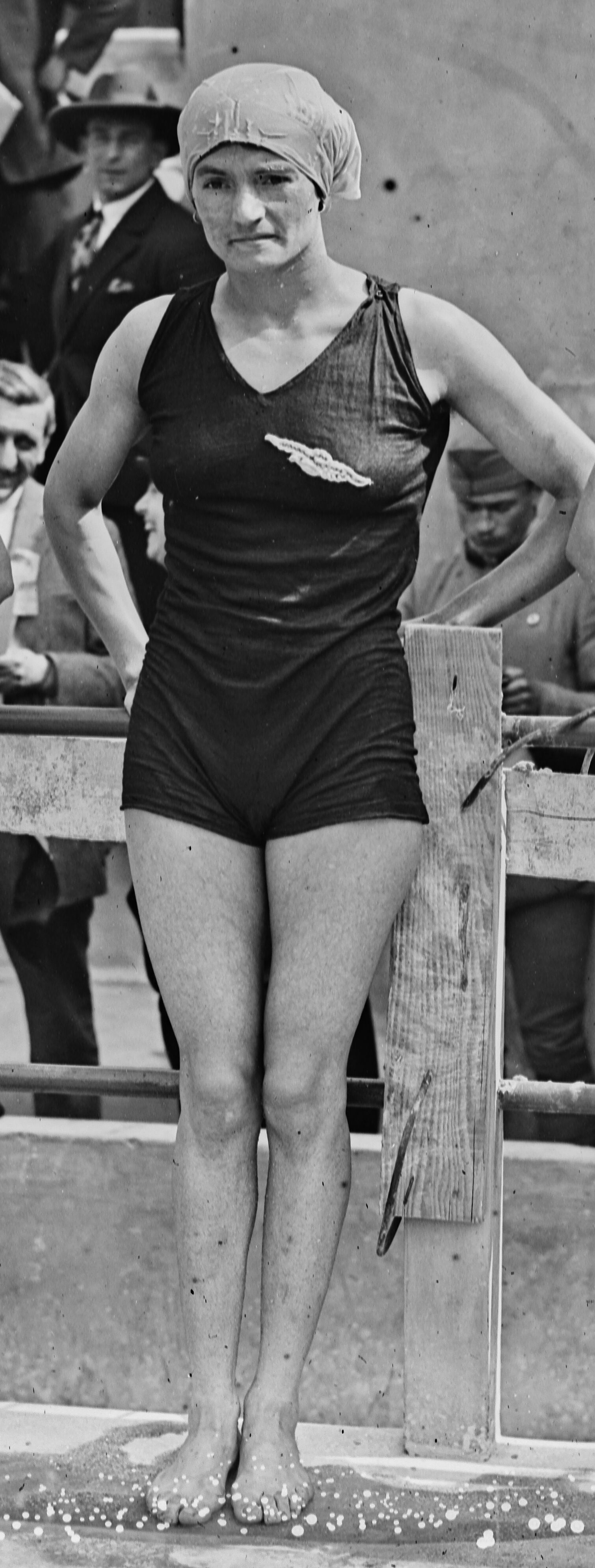

Personal information
- Born: 15 December 1901
- Died: 3 July 1943 (aged 41)

Sport
- Sport: Swimming

Lucienne Rouet (15 December 1901 – 3 July 1943) was a French swimmer. She competed in the women's 100 metre backstroke event at the 1924 Summer Olympics.
