= Richard Hodgson (water polo) =

British water polo player

Personal information
- Nationality: British
- Born: 24 December 1892
- Died: 13 September 1968 (aged 75)

Sport
- Sport: Water polo

Richard Hodgson (24 December 1892 – 13 September 1968) was a British water polo player. He competed at the 1924 Summer Olympics and the 1928 Summer Olympics.
