= Bernard Croucher =

British rower

Personal information
- Nationality: British
- Born: 21 May 1901; Staines, England
- Died: 13 April 1972 (aged 70); Sunbury-on-Thames, England

Sport
- Sport: Rowing

Bernard Croucher (21 May 1901 – 13 April 1972) was a British rower. He competed in the men's coxed four event at the 1924 Summer Olympics.
