= Marcel Roman (rower) =

Belgian rower

Personal information
- Born: 29 June 1900
- Died: 21 June 1969 (aged 68) Liège

Sport
- Sport: Rowing
- Club: Royal Sport Nautique de la Meuse (RSNM), Liège
Medal record
Men's rowing
Representing Belgium
European Rowing Championships
Gold medal – first place	1921 Amsterdam	Coxed pair
Bronze medal – third place	1924 Zürich	Coxed four

Marcel Roman (29 June 1900 – 21 June 1969) was a Belgian rower. He competed at the 1924 Summer Olympics in Paris with the men's coxed four where they were eliminated in the round one repechage. At the 1928 Summer Olympics in Amsterdam he was eliminated in the round one repechage with the men's eight.
