= Jules George =

Belgian rower

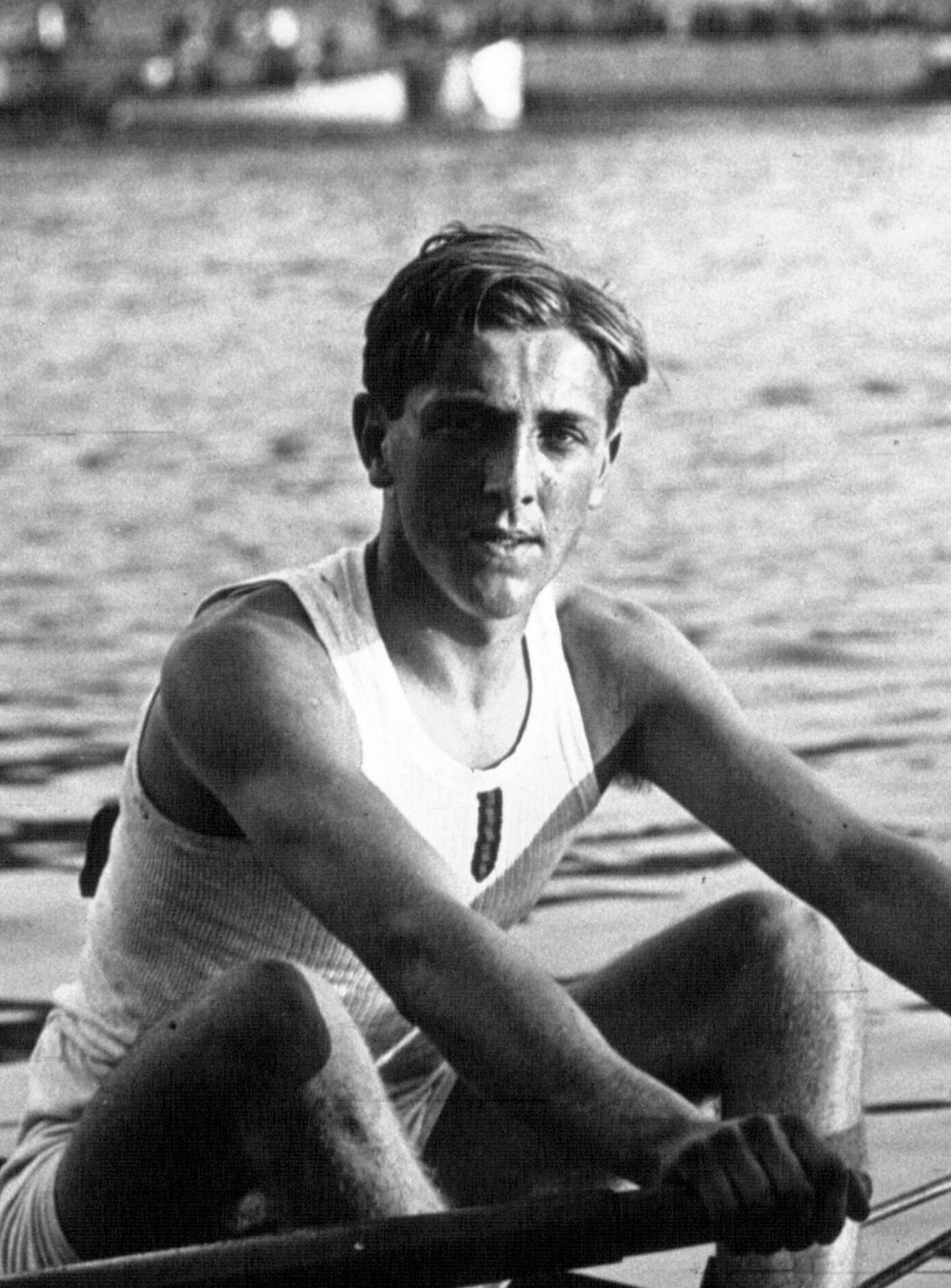
- George in 1921

Personal information
- Born: 14 May 1903
- Died: April 1983 (aged 79)
- Relatives: Robert George (son)

Sport
- Sport: Rowing
- Club: UNL, Liège
Medal record
Men's rowing
Representing Belgium
European Rowing Championships
Silver medal – second place	1921 Amsterdam	Double sculls
Bronze medal – third place	1922 Barcelona	Double sculls
Bronze medal – third place	1924 Zürich	Coxed four

Jules George (14 May 1903 – April 1983) was a Belgian rower and sports official.

George joined the soccer club RFC Liège in 1915 but it was in rowing that he had better success. He competed at the 1924 Summer Olympics in Paris with the men's coxed four where they were eliminated in the round one repechage. His son, Robert George, won the Double Sculls Challenge Cup at the 1952 Henley Royal Regatta and competed in the 1952 Summer Olympics.

George became the largest scrap metal dealer in Europe after WWII. In 1971, he became the president of RFC Liège and held that role until his death in April 1983. He is buried in the Robermont Cemetery in Liège.
