= Percival Kinnear Wise =

British polo player

Olympic medal record

Men's Polo
| Bronze medal – third place | 1924 Paris | polo |

Wing Commander Percival Kinnear Wise CMG DSO (17 April 1885 – 7 June 1968) was a British Olympic polo player and Royal Air Force officer.

== Biography ==
Wise was born on 17 April 1885 in Hong Kong to Alfred Gascoyne Wise and Augusta Frances Nugent. His father was a judge for the Supreme Court of Hong Kong, and his brother was Alfred Roy Wise.

He was a Group Captain in the military and served with the British Indian Army and then the Royal Flying Corps. For his services in the First World War, he was made a Companion of the Distinguished Service Order and the Order of St. Michael and St. George.

He won the bronze medal in the 1924 Paris Summer Olympic Games alongside teammates Frederick W. Barrett, Frederick Guest, and Dennis Bingham.

He died on 7 June 1968 in Aldeburgh.
