= Henryk Fronczak =

Polish rower

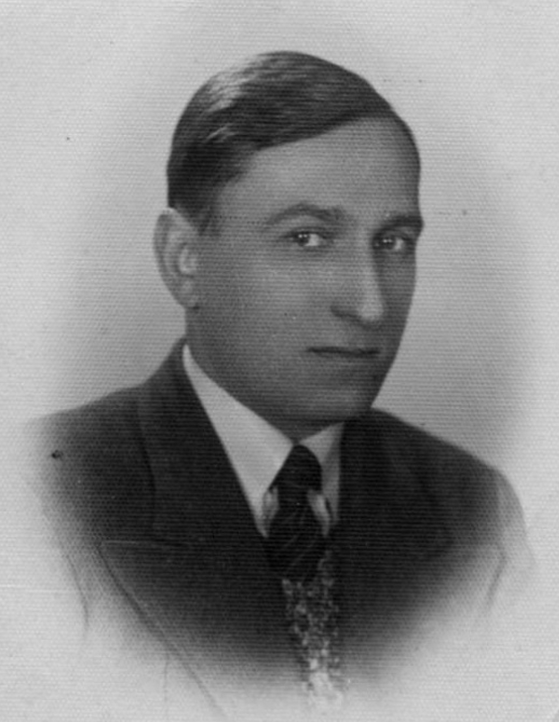

Personal information
- Nationality: Polish
- Born: 16 August 1898 Warsaw, Russian Empire
- Died: 4 April 1981 (aged 82) Warsaw, Poland

Sport
- Sport: Rowing

Henryk Fronczak (16 August 1898 – 4 April 1981) was a Polish rower. He competed in the men's coxed four event at the 1924 Summer Olympics.
