= Thomas Monk (rower) =

British rower

Personal information
- Full name: Thomas Stanley Monk
- Nationality: British
- Born: 20 August 1904; Chertsey, England
- Died: April 1979 (aged 74–75); Yeovil, England

Sport
- Sport: Rowing

Thomas Stanley Monk (20 August 1904 – April 1979) was a British rower. He competed in the men's coxed four event at the 1924 Summer Olympics.
