= Ed Mitchell (rower) =

American rower (1901–1970)

Personal information
- Full name: Edward Paul Mitchell
- Born: July 23, 1901 Philadelphia, Pennsylvania
- Died: June 25, 1970 (aged 68) Philadelphia, Pennsylvania
- Education: University of Pennsylvania
Medal record
Men's rowing
Bronze medal – third place	1924 Paris	Coxed four

Edward Paul Mitchell, Jr. (July 23, 1901 – June 25, 1970) was an American construction engineer, and a rower who at 22 competed in the 1924 Summer Olympics in Paris. In 1924 he won the bronze medal as member of the American boat in the coxed four event.

Ed Mitchell rowed for the University of Pennsylvania, graduating in 1923, and then joined the Bachelor’s Barge Club. Mitchell won a bronze medal with the Barge Club four at the 1924 Paris Olympics. He was a construction engineer. He served for a period as Captain of Penn's Varsity eight, particularly in 1922.

== Olympics ==
In the Olympic qualifying round, Mitchell rowed in front in the bow position in a coxed four with four other members of the Bachelor's Barge Club on Philadelphia's Schuykill River on June 13, 1924.

=== Paris competition ===
After their arrival in Paris, the American coxed fours team from Philadelphia won their heat in the preliminary round with a time of 7 minutes 19 seconds for the 1.24 mile course. In the final round, the Americans won the bronze medal in the coxed four event. The competition, the fourth appearance of the event, was held from July 13–17, 1924 on the river Seine. There were 10 boats (51 competitors, with Switzerland making one substitution) from 10 nations, with each nation limited to a single boat in the event. The competition was won by Switzerland, the nation's second consecutive victory in the event, with France taking the Silver medal.

Coxed Four shell configuration, w/coxswain in yellow

As shown at left, the coxed four event featured five-person boats, with four rowers and a coxswain shown as a yellow dot. It was a sweep rowing event, with the rowers each having one oar and each rowing on one side. The competition used the 2000 metres (1.24 miles) distance that became standard at the 1912 Olympics and which has been used ever since. The Americans finished with a time of 7:23, only two and a half seconds behind France who took the bronze. Switzerland, the pre-race favorite, finished with a sizable three-minute lead over second place France. Bob Gerhardt took the position of bowsmen in the front, Sid Jelinek rowed in seat two, Mitchell rowed third, Henry Welsford rowed fourth (last) or Sweep, and John Kennedy functioned as coxswain.

Mitchell died in Philadelphia on June 25, 1970.
