= Károly Koch =

Hungarian coxswain

Personal information
- Born: 3 September 1885
- Died: 24 March 1932 (aged 46)

Sport
- Sport: Rowing
- Club: Pannónia Evezős Egylet
Medal record
Men's rowing
Representing Hungary
European Rowing Championships
Bronze medal – third place	1910 Ostend	Eight
Silver medal – second place	1921 Amsterdam	Eight
Bronze medal – third place	1922 Barcelona	Eight
Bronze medal – third place	1923 Como	Coxed four
Silver medal – second place	1925 Prague	Coxed four

Károly Koch (3 September 1885 – 24 March 1932) was a Hungarian coxswain. He competed at the 1924 Summer Olympics in Paris with the men's eight where they were eliminated in the round one repechage.
