= Henri Wernli =

Swiss wrestler (1898–1961)

- Born: 3 June 1898; Bern, Switzerland
- Died: 3 June 1961 (aged 63)
Medal record
Men's freestyle wrestling
Representing Switzerland
Olympic Games
Silver medal – second place	1924 Paris	Heavyweight

Henri Wernli (3 June 1898 – 3 June 1961) was a Swiss freestyle wrestler and Olympic medalist. Wernli won a gold medal at the 1924 Summer Olympics in Paris, France. Wernli also competed at the 1928 Summer Olympics in Amsterdam, Netherlands.
