= Harry Barnsley =

British coxswain (1905–1969)

Personal information
- Nationality: British
- Born: 17 March 1905 Chertsey, England
- Died: 25 April 1969 (aged 64)

Sport
- Sport: Rowing

Harry Leonard Barnsley (17 March 1905 – 25 April 1969) was a British rowing coxswain. He competed in the men's coxed four event at the 1924 Summer Olympics.
