= Harry Steel (wrestler) =

American wrestler (1899–1971)

Personal information
- Born: April 18, 1899 East Sparta, Ohio, U.S.
- Died: October 8, 1971 (aged 72) London, Ohio, U.S.

Sport
- Country: United States
- Sport: Wrestling
- Events: Freestyle and Folkstyle
- College team: Ohio State
- Team: USA
Medal record
Men's freestyle wrestling
Representing the United States
Olympic Games
Gold medal – first place	1924 Paris	Heavyweight

Harry Steel (April 18, 1899 – October 8, 1971) was an American wrestler and Olympic champion. He competed at the 1924 Olympic Games in Paris, where he won a gold medal in the freestyle heavyweight division. Steel initially did not make the U.S. Olympic team, but the wrestler who was supposed to go ended up not being able to compete. He was called up to the team and went on to win the Olympic gold medal.

Steel wrestled and played football at Ohio State University, where he lettered in both sports. In his senior year, he was the undefeated Western Conference (now the Big Ten) heavyweight wrestling champion. He was inducted into the Ohio State Varsity O Hall of Fame in 1980.
