= Vincent Boveington =

British rower and author

Personal information
- Full name: Vincent Joseph Boveington
- Nationality: British
- Born: 3 March 1903; Weybridge, Surrey, England
- Died: 1980 (aged 77); Hendon, London, England

Sport
- Sport: Rowing

Vincent Joseph Boveington (3 March 1903 – 1980) was a British rower and author. His name was misrecorded as Victor Bovington. He competed in the men's coxed four event at the 1924 Summer Olympics.
