= Helen Boyle (swimmer) =

British swimmer

Personal information
- Born: 28 August 1908
- Died: 17 September 1970 (aged 62)

Sport
- Sport: Swimming

Helen Boyle (28 August 1908 – 17 September 1970) was a British swimmer. She competed in the women's 100 metre backstroke event at the 1924 Summer Olympics.
