= Dennis Bingham =

British polo player (1880–1940)

Olympic medal record

Men's Polo
Bronze medal – third place	1924 Paris	polo

John Dennis Yelverton Bingham (11 August 1880 – 28 December 1940) was a British Olympic polo player.

== Biography ==
He was born on 11 August 1880 in Bangor, County Down in Northern Ireland to John George Barry Bingham and Matilda Catherine Ward. He competed in the 1924 Paris Summer Olympic Games and won the bronze medal alongside teammates Frederick Guest, Frederick W. Barrett, and Kinnear Wise. He died on 28 December 1940 in Cirencester.
