= 1924 European Rowing Championships =

- Venue: Lake Zürich
- Location: Zurich, Switzerland

The 1924 European Rowing Championships were rowing championships held on Lake Zürich in the Swiss city of Zurich. The competition was for men only and they competed in six of the seven Olympic boat classes (M1x, M2x, M2-, M2+, M4+, M8+) as they had been rowed earlier in the summer at the 1924 Summer Olympics in Paris; the new Olympic boat class of coxless four (M4-) was also part of the European Rowing Championships, but the only competitor would be Switzerland and they didn't want to win the European championship by row-over. It was the first time that the coxless pair boat class was part of the regatta.

== Medal summary ==
Event	Gold		Silver		Bronze	
Event	Country & rowers	Time	Country & rowers	Time	Country & rowers	Time
M1x	Switzerland; Josef Schneider	8:20,2	France; Marc Detton	8:29,2	Czechoslovakia; Gustav Zinke	8:33,4
M2x	Switzerland; Rudolf Bosshard; Heini Thoma	8:17,0	France{ Paul Robineau; Alfred Plé	8:40,8	Belgium; Félix Taymans; Elsocht	9:14,4
M2-	Switzerland; Alois Reinhard; Willy Siegenthaler	7:41,4	Netherlands; Willy Rösingh; Teun Beijnen	8:00,2	(Note: There were only three teams but France did not finish)	
M2+	Netherlands; Willy Rösingh; Teun Beijnen; C.J.A. van Lummel (cox)	9:09,2	Switzerland; Edouard Schädeli; Willy Müller; Gottfried Steiner (cox)	9:14,4	Italy; Ercole Olgeni; Giovanni Scatturin; Gino Sopracordevole (cox)	9:20,0
M4+	Netherlands; Jo Brandsma; Jacob Brandsma; Dirk Fortuin; Jean van Silfhout; Louis Dekker (cox)	7:20,2	Switzerland; Walter Bleuler; Max Pfeiffer; Kurt Pfeiffer; Arthur Schweizer; Werner Ottiger (cox)	7:21,0	Belgium; Marcel Roman; Jules George; Victor Denis; Lucien Brouha ? (cox)	7:38,0
M8+	Netherlands; Simon Bon; Roelof Hommema; G.J. Keller; B.G.M. van Ogtrop; C.P. Elsen; M.C. Fennema; Paul Maasland; Ted Cremer (cox)	7:07,4	Switzerland; Karl Schöchlin; Hans Schöchlin; Arnold Reymond; Hans Wendling; Heinrich Hauser; Hans Hauser; Julien Comtesse; Moritz Müller; Werner Studer (cox)	7:10,8	Czechoslovakia; Emil Ordnung; František Brozek; Vladimir Knop; Viktor Langer; Oldrich Votik; Karel Knop; Stanislav Bouska; Ivo Schweizer; Josef Jabor (cox)	7:21,4
