= Victor Denis (rower) =

Belgian rower (born 1900)

Personal information
- Born: 23 October 1900

Sport
- Sport: Rowing
- Club: RSNM, Liège
Medal record
Men's rowing
Representing Belgium
European Rowing Championships
Bronze medal – third place	1920 Mâcon	Double sculls
Bronze medal – third place	1924 Zürich	Coxed four

Victor Denis (born 23 October 1900, date of death unknown) was a Belgian rower. He competed at the 1924 Summer Olympics in Paris with the men's coxed four where they were eliminated in the round one repechage. At the 1928 Summer Olympics in Amsterdam, he was eliminated in the round one repechage with the men's eight.
