= Archie MacDonald (wrestler) =

British Olympic wrestler

- Born: 23 February 1895; Saasaig, Scotland
- Died: 5 May 1965 (aged 70); Inverness, Scotland

Archie MacDonald
Medal record

Men's freestyle wrestling

Representing Great Britain

Olympic Games
Bronze medal – third place	1924 Paris	Heavyweight

Donald Archibald MacDonald (23 February 1895 – 5 May 1965) was a British wrestler who competed in the 1920 Summer Olympics and the 1924 Summer Olympics. In 1924, at the 1924 Summer Olympics, he won the bronze medal in the freestyle wrestling heavyweight class.
