= Belgium at the 1924 Summer Olympics =

- IOC code: BEL
- NOC: Belgian Olympic Committee

in Paris
- Competitors: 172 (166 men and 6 women) in 17 sports
- Medals Ranked 10th: Gold 3 Silver 7 Bronze 3 Total 13

Summer Olympics appearances (overview)
- 1900; 1904; 1908; 1912; 1920; 1924; 1928; 1932; 1936; 1948; 1952; 1956; 1960; 1964; 1968; 1972; 1976; 1980; 1984; 1988; 1992; 1996; 2000; 2004; 2008; 2012; 2016; 2020; 2024; 2028

Other related appearances
- 1906 Intercalated Games

Belgium, the previous host of the 1920 Summer Olympics in Antwerp, competed at the 1924 Summer Olympics in Paris, France. 172 competitors, 166 men and 6 women, took part in 82 events in 17 sports.

== Medalists ==
| Medal | Name | Sport | Event | Date |
|---|---|---|---|---|
| Gold | Jean Delarge | Boxing | Men's welterweight | July 20 |
| Gold | Charles Delporte | Fencing | Men's épée | July 11 |
| Gold | Léon Huybrechts | Sailing | Monotype Class | July 13 |
| Silver | Henri Hoevenaers | Cycling | Men's individual time trial | July 23 |
| Silver | Henri Hoevenaers Auguste Parfondry Jean Van Den Bosch | Cycling | Men's team time trial | July 23 |
| Silver | Paul Anspach Joseph De Craecker Charles Delporte; Fernand de Montigny Ernest Gevers Léon Tom | Fencing | Men's team épée | July 9 |
| Silver | Désiré Beaurain Charles Crahay Fernand de Montigny; Maurice Van Damme Marcel Berré Albert De Roocker | Fencing | Men's team foil | July 9 |
| Silver | Joseph De Combe | Swimming | Men's 200 m breaststroke | July 17 |
| Silver | Belgium men's national water polo team: Gérard Blitz; Maurice Blitz; Joseph Cludts; Joseph De Combe; Pierre Dewin; Albert Durant; Georges Fleurix; Paul Gailly; Joseph Pletinckx; Jules Thiry; Jean-Pierre Vermetten | Water polo | | July 20 |
| Silver | Pierre Ollivier | Wrestling | Men's freestyle middleweight | July 14 |
| Bronze | Joseph Jules Beecken | Boxing | Men's middleweight | July 20 |
| Bronze | Léonard Daghelinckx Henri Hoevenaers; Fernand Saive Jean Van Den Bosch | Cycling | Men's team pursuit | July 27 |
| Bronze | Maurice Van Damme | Fencing | Men's foil | July 4 |

== Athletics ==
Seventeen athletes represented Belgium in 1924. It was the nation's fourth appearance in the sport.

Ranks given are within the heat.

| Athlete | Event | Heats | | Quarterfinals | | Semifinals | | Final | |
| Athlete | Event | Result | Rank | Result | Rank | Result | Rank | Result | Rank |
|---|---|---|---|---|---|---|---|---|---|
| Marcel Alavoine | Marathon | N/A | | | | | | 3:03:20.0 | 15 |
| Paul Brochart | 100 m | Unknown | 2 Q | Unknown | 4 | did not advance | | | |
| Paul Brochart | 200 m | 23.0 | 1 Q | Unknown | 3 | did not advance | | | |
| Auguste Broos | Marathon | N/A | | | | | | 3:14:03.0 | 20 |
| Henricus Cockuyt | 100 m | Unknown | 3 | did not advance | | | | | |
| Léon Fourneau | 1500 m | N/A | | | | Unknown | 4 | did not advance | |
| Jean Hénault | High jump | N/A | | | | 1.80 | 2 | did not advance | |
| Maurice Henrijean | Pole vault | N/A | | | | 3.66 | 1 Q | No mark | 7 |
| Gaston LeClercq | Marathon | N/A | | | | | | 3:27:54.0 | 26 |
| Jules Migeot | 400 m | 51.6 | 3 | did not advance | | | | | |
| Jules Migeot | 400 m hurdles | N/A | | 56.7 | 3 | did not advance | | | |
| Eugène Moedbeck | 100 m | Unknown | 6 | did not advance | | | | | |
| François Morren | 800 m | N/A | | Unknown | 2 Q | 1:58.5 | 6 | did not advance | |
| Josse Ruth | Pentathlon | N/A | | | | | | Eliminated-3 | |
| Josse Ruth | Decathlon | N/A | | | | | | 5866.670 | 17 |
| Gerard Steurs | Marathon | N/A | | | | | | did not finish | |
| Felicien Van de Putte | Marathon | N/A | | | | | | did not finish | |
| Camille Van de Velde | 5000 m | N/A | | | | Unknown | 8 | did not advance | |
| Camille Van de Velde | 10000 m | N/A | | | | | | did not finish | |
| Joseph Van Der Wee | 1500 m | N/A | | | | Unknown | 6 | did not advance | |
| Fred Zinner | Pentathlon | N/A | | | | | | Eliminated-3 | |

== Boxing ==
Ten boxers represented Belgium at the 1924 Games. It was the nation's second appearance in the sport. Belgium won Olympic medals for the first time with two medals, including Jean Delarge's gold in the welterweight.

| Boxer | Weight class | Round of 32 | Round of 16 | Quarterfinals | Semifinals | Final / Bronze match | |
| Boxer | Weight class | Opposition Score | Opposition Score | Opposition Score | Opposition Score | Opposition Score | Rank |
|---|---|---|---|---|---|---|---|
| Joseph Beecken | Middleweight | Bye | Funk (USA); W | Daney (FRA); W | Mallin (GBR); L | Black (CAN); W | 3rd place, bronze medalist(s) |
| Lucien Debleyser | Flyweight | Trève (FRA); L | did not advance | | | | 17 |
| Fernand Delarge | Light heavyweight | Sørsdal (NOR); L | did not advance | | | | 17 |
| Jean Delarge | Welterweight | Sauthier (SUI); W | O'Hanrahan (GBR); W | Ingram (RSA); W | Lewis (CAN); W | Méndez (ARG); W | 1st place, gold medalist(s) |
| Raymond Devergnies | Featherweight | Bru (ESP); W | Francecchini (ITA); W | Dingley (GBR); W | Salas (USA); L | Quartucci (ARG); L | 4 |
| Alfred Genon | Lightweight | Lőwig (HUN); W | Sinclair (AUS); W | Boylstein (USA); L | did not advance | | 5 |
| Joseph Rémy | Welterweight | Dam (NED); L | did not advance | | | | 17 |
| François Sybille | Bantamweight | Barta (AUT); W | Ces (FRA); L | did not advance | | | 9 |
| Karel Tuns | Featherweight | Bye | Dingley (GBR); L | did not advance | | | 9 |
| Germain Van Haelen | Middleweight | Bye | Daney (FRA); L | did not advance | | | 9 |

| Opponent nation | Wins | Losses | Percent |
|---|---|---|---|
| Argentina | 1 | 1 | .500 |
| Australia | 1 | 0 | 1.000 |
| Austria | 1 | 0 | 1.000 |
| Canada | 2 | 0 | 1.000 |
| Spain | 1 | 0 | 1.000 |
| France | 1 | 3 | .250 |
| Great Britain | 2 | 2 | .500 |
| Hungary | 1 | 0 | 1.000 |
| Italy | 1 | 0 | 1.000 |
| Netherlands | 0 | 1 | .000 |
| Norway | 0 | 1 | .000 |
| South Africa | 1 | 0 | 1.000 |
| Switzerland | 1 | 0 | 1.000 |
| United States | 1 | 2 | .333 |
| Total | 14 | 10 | .583 |

| Round | Wins | Losses | Percent |
|---|---|---|---|
| Round of 32 | 4 | 3 | .571 |
| Round of 16 | 4 | 3 | .571 |
| Quarterfinals | 3 | 1 | .750 |
| Semifinals | 1 | 2 | .333 |
| Final | 1 | 0 | 1.000 |
| Bronze match | 1 | 1 | .500 |
| Total | 14 | 10 | .583 |

== Cycling ==
Nine cyclists represented Belgium in 1924. It was the nation's fifth appearance in the sport as well as the Games.

The Belgians won both of the road cycling silver medals, with Hoevenaers leading the team and taking the individual medal. Three of the four road cyclists also competed in the team pursuit event on the track, winning bronze.

=== Road cycling ===
Ranks given are within the heat.

| Cyclist | Event | Final | |
| Cyclist | Event | Result | Rank |
|---|---|---|---|
| Henri Hoevenaers | Time trial | 6:30:27.0 | 2nd place, silver medalist(s) |
| Auguste Parfondry | Time trial | 6:35:57.0 | 6 |
| Fernand Saivé | Time trial | 6:48:46.4 | 16 |
| Jean Van Den Bosch | Time trial | 6:40:31.4 | 10 |
| Henri Hoevenaers; Auguste Parfondry; Fernand Saivé; Jean Vandenbosch | Team time trial | 19:46:55.4 | 2nd place, silver medalist(s) |

=== Track cycling ===
Ranks given are within the heat.

| Cyclist | Event | First round | | First repechage | | Quarterfinals | | Second repechage | | Semifinals | | Final | |
| Cyclist | Event | Result | Rank | Result | Rank | Result | Rank | Result | Rank | Result | Rank | Result | Rank |
|---|---|---|---|---|---|---|---|---|---|---|---|---|---|
| Josef Boons | 50 km | N/A | | | | | | | | | | Unknown | 8–36 |
| Charles Cadron | 50 km | N/A | | | | | | | | | | Unknown | 8–36 |
| Léonard Daghelinckx | 50 km | N/A | | | | | | | | | | Unknown | 8–36 |
| Prudent De Bruyne | Sprint | 13.8 | 1 Q | Advanced directly | | Unknown | 3 r | Unknown | 2 | did not advance | | | |
| Jean Verheyen | 50 km | N/A | | | | | | | | | | Unknown | 8–36 |
| Jean Verheyen | Sprint | Unknown | 2 r | Unknown | 3 | did not advance | | | | | | | |
| Léonard Daghelinckx; Henri Hoevenaers; Fernand Saivé; Jean Van Den Bosch | Team pursuit | 5:12.0 | 1 Q | N/A | | 5:12.2 | 1 Q | N/A | | Unknown | 2 r | Unknown | 3rd place, bronze medalist(s) |

== Diving ==
Two divers represented Belgium in 1924. It was the nation's third appearance in the sport, and the first time Belgium sent a woman in diving.

Ranks given are within the heat.

Men

| Diver | Event | Semifinals | | | Final | | |
| Diver | Event | Points | Score | Rank | Points | Score | Rank |
|---|---|---|---|---|---|---|---|
| Gustave Van Heymbeeck | 10 m platform | 27 | 354.3 | 5 | did not advance | | |
| Gustave Van Heymbeeck | Plain high dive | 41 | 118 | 8 | did not advance | | |

Women

| Diver | Event | Semifinals | | | Final | | |
| Diver | Event | Points | Score | Rank | Points | Score | Rank |
|---|---|---|---|---|---|---|---|
| Sophie Hennebert | 10 m platform | 22 | 118 | 5 | did not advance | | |

== Equestrian ==
Eleven equestrians represented Belgium in 1924. It was the nation's fourth appearance in the sport; Belgium was one of three nations (along with France and the United States) to have competed in each Olympic equestrian competition to that point. Belgium finished without a medal for the first time; the best result was the jumping team (at fourth), while the top individual place was de Brabandère's sixth in the eventing.

| Equestrian | Event | Final | | |
| Equestrian | Event | Score | Time | Rank |
|---|---|---|---|---|
| Jules Bonvalet | Eventing | 1428.0 | N/A | 16 |
| Jean Breuls | Jumping | 24.00 | 2:44.4 | 22 |
| Baudouin de Brabandère | Eventing | 1728.5 | N/A | 6 |
| Roger Delrue | Dressage | 170.8 | N/A | 23 |
| Joseph Fallon | Eventing | 1077.0 | N/A | 21 |
| Nicolas LeRoy | Jumping | 14.75 | 2:42.2 | 8 |
| Gaston Mesmaekers | Jumping | 22.75 | 2:50.0 | 18 |
| Jacques Misonne | Jumping | 19.50 | 3:05.4 | 13 |
| Léon Nossent | Eventing | 924.0 | N/A | 27 |
| Georges Serlez | Dressage | 242.0 | N/A | 9 |
| Joseph Stevenart | Dressage | 233.2 | N/A | 13 |
| Jules Bonvalet; Baudouin de Brabandère; Joseph Fallon; Léon Nossent | Team eventing | 4233.5 | N/A | 5 |
| Jean Breuls; Nicolas LeRoy; Gaston Mesmaekers; Jacques Misonne | Team eventing | 57.00 | N/A | 4 |

== Fencing ==
Nineteen fencers, all men, represented Belgium in 1924. It was the nation's fifth appearance in the sport as well as the Games. The four medals, including one gold, won by Belgian fencers put the country second on the sport's medal leaderboard for the year.

All four épéeists reached the twelve-man final, with Delporte winning the gold medal. The épée won silver, giving four-time Olympian Paul Anspach his fifth Olympic fencing medal 16 years after he won his first. Van Damme took bronze in the foil, as the team took silver, to give Belgium its first medals in foil fencing.

Men

Ranks given are within the pool.

| Fencer | Event | Round 1 | | Round 2 | | Quarterfinals | | Semifinals | | Final | |
| Fencer | Event | Result | Rank | Result | Rank | Result | Rank | Result | Rank | Result | Rank |
|---|---|---|---|---|---|---|---|---|---|---|---|
| Charles Acke | Sabre | N/A | | | | 2–4 | 6 | did not advance | | | |
| Paul Anspach | Épée | 4–4 | 5 Q | N/A | | 6–4 | 3 Q | 6–5 | 4 Q | 4–7 | 9 |
| Omer Berck | Sabre | N/A | | | | 4–1 | 1 Q | 3–5 | 6 | did not advance | |
| Charles Crahay | Foil | 2–1 | 2 Q | 4–1 | 1 Q | 2–3 | 5 | did not advance | | | |
| Balthazar De Beukelaer | Foil | 0–1 | 3 Q | 3–2 | 3 Q | 2–3 | 3 Q | 2–3 | 4 Q | 0–6 | 7 |
| Charles Delporte | Épée | 7–2 | 1 Q | N/A | | 7–3 | 1 Q | 6–5 | 2 Q | 8–3 | 1st place, gold medalist(s) |
| Eugène Dufrane | Foil | 3–0 | 1 Q | 1–3 | 4 | did not advance | | | | | |
| Robert Feyerick | Sabre | N/A | | | | 4–1 | 2 Q | 4–4 | 6 | did not advance | |
| Ernest Gevers | Épée | 6–3 | 1 Q | N/A | | 6–3 | 1 Q | 4–7 | 6 Q | 1–10 | 12 |
| Jules Maes | Sabre | N/A | | | | 4–2 | 2 Q | 2–6 | 7 | did not advance | |
| Léon Tom | Épée | 5–4 | 3 Q | N/A | | 6–3 | 3 Q | 7–4 | 1 Q | 5–6 | 7 |
| Maurice Van Damme | Foil | 3–0 | 1 Q | 5–0 | 1 Q | 2–3 | 4 Q | 3–2 | 3 Q | 4–2 | 3rd place, bronze medalist(s) |
| Charles Delporte; Robert Feyerick; Félix Goblet; Léon Tom; Jean-Pierre Willems | Team sabre | 1–0 | 2 Q | N/A | | 0–2 | 3 | did not advance | | | |
| Paul Anspach; Joseph De Craecker; Fernand de Montigny; Charles Delporte; Ernest Gevers; Léon Tom | Team épée | 1–0 | 1 Q | N/A | | 1–0 | 1 Q | 1–0 | 2 Q | 2–1 | 2nd place, silver medalist(s) |
| Marcel Berré; Désiré Beaurain; Charles Crahay; Albert De Roocker; Orphile De Montigny; Maurice Van Damme | Team foil | Bye | | N/A | | 2–0 | 1 Q | 1–0 | 2 Q | 1–1 | 2nd place, silver medalist(s) |

== Football ==
Belgium competed in the Olympic football tournament for the third time, attempting to defend its 1920 gold medal. They were stunned in their first match, however, losing the second-round game to Sweden 8–1.

Round 1
Bye

Round 2

May 29, 1924

| Sweden | 8–1 | Belgium |
|---|---|---|
| Kock 8' 24' 77'; Rydell 20' 61' 83'; Brommesson 30'; Keller 46' | Report | Larnoe 67' |

Stade Olympique, Colombes
Attendance: 8,532
Referee: Heinrich Retschury (AUT)

Final rank
9th place

== Modern pentathlon ==
Four pentathletes represented Belgium in 1924. It was the nation's debut in the sport.

| Pentathlete | Event | Final | |
| Pentathlete | Event | Score | Rank |
|---|---|---|---|
| Léopold Buffin de Chosal | Individual | 89.5 | 17 |
| Jacques De Wykerslooth De Rooyesteyn | Individual | 123 | 29 |
| Jules Hulsmans | Individual | 140.5 | 35 |
| J. L. M. Van Loocke | Individual | 92 | 18 |

== Rowing ==
15 rowers represented Belgium in 1924. It was the nation's fifth appearance in the sport as well as the Games, tying Canada and Great Britain for most rowing appearances.

Ranks given are within the heat.

| Rower | Event | Semifinals | | Repechage | | Final | |
| Rower | Event | Result | Rank | Result | Rank | Result | Rank |
|---|---|---|---|---|---|---|---|
| Alphonse Dewette; Eugène Gabriels; Marcel Wauters | Coxed pair | Unknown | 3 | N/A | | did not advance | |
| Lucien Brouha; Victor Denis; Jules George; Marcel Roman | Coxed four | Unknown | 2 r | Unknown | 4 | did not advance | |
| Arthur D'Anvers; Gérard de Gezelle; René De Landtsheer; August Geinger; Léon Lippens; Hippolyte Schouppe; Robert Swartelé; Jean Van Silfhout; Marcel Wauters | Eight | Unknown | 2 r | Unknown | 4 | did not advance | |

== Sailing ==
Eight sailors represented Belgium in 1924. It was the nation's third appearance in the sport. Huybrechts took the gold in the monotype dinghy.

| Sailor | Event | Qualifying | | | | Final | | | |
| Sailor | Event | Race 1 | Race 2 | Race 3 | Total | Race 1 | Race 2 | Total | Rank |
|---|---|---|---|---|---|---|---|---|---|
| Léon Huybrechts | Olympic monotype | 2 Q | DNF | N/A | | 1 | 1 | 2 | 1st place, gold medalist(s) |
| Léon Huybrechts; John Klotz; Léopold Standaert | 6 metre class | 6 | 7 | 3 | 16 | did not advance | | | 5 |
| Fernand Carlier; Maurice Passelecq; Emmanuel Pauwels; Paul Van Halteren; Victor Vanderslyen | 8 metre class | 5 | 2 Q | 5 | 12 | DNF (4) | 4 | 8 | 4 |

== Shooting ==
Fourteen sport shooters represented Belgium in 1924. It was the nation's fourth appearance in the sport.

| Shooter | Event | Final | |
| Shooter | Event | Score | Rank |
|---|---|---|---|
| Conrad Adriaenssens | 50 m rifle, prone | 384 | 30 |
| Conrad Adriaenssens | 600 m free rifle | 78 | 41 |
| Arthur Balbaert | 50 m rifle, prone | 385 | 26 |
| Arthur Balbaert | 600 m free rifle | 84 | 14 |
| Albert Bosquet | Trap | Unknown | 31–44 |
| Charles Delbarre | 50 m rifle, prone | 383 | 31 |
| Louis D'Heur | Trap | 96 | 5 |
| Émile Dupont | Trap | Unknown | 31–44 |
| François Lafortune | 25 m rapid fire pistol | 13 | 40 |
| François Lafortune | 600 m free rifle | 83 | 19 |
| Victor Robert | 25 m rapid fire pistol | 13 | 40 |
| Jacques Thuriaux | 25 m rapid fire pistol | 11 | 50 |
| Paul Van Asbroeck | 25 m rapid fire pistol | 8 | 51 |
| Paul Van Asbroeck | 50 m rifle, prone | 391 | 9 |
| Paul Van Asbroeck | 600 m free rifle | 82 | 24 |
| Louis Van Tilt | Trap | Unknown | 31–44 |
| Conrad Adriaenssens; Arthur Balbaert; François Lafortune; Charles Scheirlinck; Paul Van Asbroeck | Team free rifle | 550 | 11 |
| Albert Bosquet; Louis D'Heur; Émile Dupont; Jacques Mouton; Henri Quersin; Louis Van Tilt | Team clay pigeons | 550 | 11 |

== Swimming ==
Ranks given are within the heat.

| Swimmer | Event | Heats | | Semifinals | | Final | |
| Swimmer | Event | Result | Rank | Result | Rank | Result | Rank |
|---|---|---|---|---|---|---|---|
| Gérard Blitz | 100 m backstroke | 1:19.0 | 2 Q | 1:19.0 | 1 Q | 1:19.6 | 4 |
| Joseph de Combe | 200 m breaststroke | 3:02.0 | 1 Q | 3:00.2 | 1 Q | 2:59.2 | 2nd place, silver medalist(s) |
| Albert Buydens; Joseph Callens; Martial van Schelle; Emiel Thienpont | 4 × 200 m freestyle relay | 11:14.8 | 3 | did not advance | | | |

== Tennis ==
Men

| Athlete | Event | Round of 128 | Round of 64 | Round of 32 | Round of 16 | Quarterfinals | Semifinals | Final | |
| Athlete | Event | Opposition Score | Opposition Score | Opposition Score | Opposition Score | Opposition Score | Opposition Score | Opposition Score | Rank |
|---|---|---|---|---|---|---|---|---|---|
| Stéphane Halot | Singles | Ireland (IRL); W 6–1, 6–4, 6–4 | Willard (AUS); L 6–8, 2–6, 2–6 | did not advance | | | | | |
| Albert Lammens | Singles | Bye | Macenauer (TCH); L 0–6, 1–6, 0–6 | did not advance | | | | | |
| Victor de Laveleye | Singles | Bye | Richards (USA); L 2–6, 4–6, 0–6 | did not advance | | | | | |
| Jean Washer | Singles | Mişu (ROU); W 6–3, 6–4, 6–2 | Flaquer (ESP); W 6–1, 6–4, 7–5 | Hunter (USA); W 2–6, 1–6, 6–2, 6–1, 6–4 | de Morpurgo (ITA); L 6–2, 4–6, 6–1, 4–6, 6–8 | did not advance | | | |
| Stéphane Halot; Albert Lammens | Doubles | —N/a | Bye | Lacoste / Borotra (FRA); L 3–6, 0–6, 2–6 | did not advance | | | | |
| Victor de Laveleye; Jean Washer | Doubles | —N/a | Bye | de Morpurgo / Serventi (ITA); L 4–6, 4–6, 5–7 | did not advance | | | | |

Women

| Athlete | Event | Round of 64 | Round of 32 | Round of 16 | Quarterfinals | Semifinals | Final | |
| Athlete | Event | Opposition Score | Opposition Score | Opposition Score | Opposition Score | Opposition Score | Opposition Score | Rank |
|---|---|---|---|---|---|---|---|---|
| Christine de Borman | Singles | Bye | McKane (GBR); L 0–6, 2–6 | did not advance | | | | |
| Marthe Dupont | Singles | Bye | Bouman (NED); L 6–8, 4–6 | did not advance | | | | |
| Marie Janssen | Singles | Várady-Péter (HUN); L 4–6, 1–6 | did not advance | | | | | |
| Marie Storms | Singles | Bye | Shepherd-Barron (GBR); L 1–6, 1–6 | did not advance | | | | |
| Christine de Borman; Marie Storms | Doubles | —N/a | Bye | Covell / McKane (GBR); L 1–6, 2–6 | did not advance | | | |

Mixed

| Athlete | Event | Round of 32 | Round of 16 | Quarterfinals | Semifinals | Final | |
| Athlete | Event | Opposition Score | Opposition Score | Opposition Score | Opposition Score | Opposition Score | Rank |
|---|---|---|---|---|---|---|---|
| Marthe Dupont; Jean Washer | Doubles | Bye | Mallory / Nielsen (NOR); L 6–1, 3–6, 3–6 | did not advance | | | |
| Christine de Borman; Stéphane Halot | Doubles | Brehm / Tegner (DEN); W 6–2, 6–4 | Fick / Müller (SWE); L 0–6, 3–6 | did not advance | | | |

== Water polo ==
In its fifth Olympic water polo appearance, Belgium continued its streak of medal wins by claiming its fourth silver (and fifth overall) medal.

Roster

- Gérard Blitz
- Maurice Blitz
- Albert Durant
- Joseph de Combe
- Joseph Pletincx
- Joseph Cludts
- Georges Fleurix
- Paul Gailly
- Pierre Dewin
- Jules Thiry
- Pierre Vermetten

First round
- Bye
Quarterfinals

| Belgium | 3–2 | Hungary | Piscine des Tourelles |

Semifinals

| Belgium | 5–1 | Czechoslovakia | Piscine des Tourelles |

Final

| France | 3–0 | Belgium | Piscine des Tourelles |

Silver medal semifinals

| Belgium | 4–3 | Sweden | Piscine des Tourelles |

Silver medal final

| United States | 1–2 | Belgium | Piscine des Tourelles |

== Weightlifting ==
| Athlete | Event | 1H Snatch | 1H Clean & Jerk | Press | Snatch | Clean & Jerk | Total | Rank |
|---|---|---|---|---|---|---|---|---|
| Georges Bernaert | Men's +82.5 kg | | | | | | 465 | 9 |
| G. Butter | Men's −67.5 kg | 65 | 75 | 72.5 | 82.5 | 110 | 405 | 10 |
| M. Van der Goten | Men's −75 kg | 60 | 75 | 72.5 | 85 | 110 | 402.5 | 13 |
| V. Van Hamme | Men's −75 kg | 60 | 75 | 70 | 75 | 110 | 390 | 16 |
| Nicolas Horsch | Men's −75 kg | 55 | 67.5 | 77.5 | 80 | 100 | 380 | 20 |
| Albert Maes | Men's −60 kg | 55 | 70 | 65 | 67.5 | 95 | 352.5 | 13 |
| Nicolaas Moerloos | Men's −60 kg | 55 | 75 | 65 | 67.5 | 92.5 | 355 | 12 |
| F. Verdonck | Men's −82.5 kg | 60 | 70 | 70 | 80 | 100 | 380 | 17 |

== Wrestling ==
=== Freestyle wrestling ===
Men's

| Athlete | Event | Round of 32 | Round of 16 | Quarterfinal | Semifinal | Final | |
| Athlete | Event | Opposition Result | Opposition Result | Opposition Result | Opposition Result | Opposition Result | Rank |
|---|---|---|---|---|---|---|---|
| Joseph Dillen | Bantamweight | —N/a | Bye | Hines (USA); L | did not advance | | |
| Herman Van Duyzen | Lightweight | —N/a | Pouvroux (FRA); L | did not advance | | | |
| Arthur Foubert | Featherweight | Bye | Naito (JPN); L | did not advance | | | |
| Jean Hutmacher | Light heavyweight | —N/a | Svensson (SWE); L | did not advance | | | |
| Frits Janssens | Welterweight | —N/a | Leino (FIN); L | did not advance | | | |
| Pierre Ollivier | Middleweight | —N/a | Bonassin (ITA); W | Tognetti (SUI); W | Pekkala (FIN); W Silver medal semifinal Rhys (GBR); W | Hagemann (SUI); L Silver medal final Penttilä (FIN); W | 2nd place, silver medalist(s) |
| Hyacinthe Roosen | Welterweight | —N/a | Dupraz (USA); W | Leino (FIN); L | did not advance | | |
| August Thys | Featherweight | Bye | Huupponen (FIN); L | did not advance | | | |

=== Greco-Roman ===
Men's

| Athlete | Event | First round | Second round | Third round | Fourth round | Fifth round | Sixth round | Seventh round | Eighth round | Rank |
| Athlete | Event | Opposition Result | Opposition Result | Opposition Result | Opposition Result | Opposition Result | Opposition Result | Opposition Result | Opposition Result | Rank |
|---|---|---|---|---|---|---|---|---|---|---|
| Lucien Bottin | Featherweight | Capron (FRA); L | Malmberg (SWE); L | did not advance | | | | | | =18 |
| Louis Christoffel | Lightweight | Ronis (LAT); L | Westerlund (FIN); L | did not advance | | | | —N/a | | =20 |
| Henri Dierickx | Bantamweight | Andersen (DEN); W | Çakin (TUR); W | Martinsen (NOR); W | Olsen (NOR); L | Retired; L | Did not advance | —N/a | | =9 |
| Jean Dumont | Middleweight | Christoffersen (DEN); L | Westerlund (FIN); L | did not advance | | | | | —N/a | =20 |
| Englebert Mollin | Lightweight | Parisel (FRA); L | Sesta (AUT); L | did not advance | | | | —N/a | | =20 |
| Lucien Pothier | Heavyweight | Sjouwerman (NED); W | Salila (FIN); W | Polis (LAT); L | Larsen (DEN); L | did not advance | | —N/a | | =5 |
| Édouard Rottiers | Featherweight | Väli (EST); L | Fettes (LUX); L | Radvány (HUN); W | did not advance | | | | | =13 |
| Pierre Slock | Bantamweight | Pütsep (EST); L | Kueny (FRA); L | did not advance | | | | —N/a | | =17 |
| Émile Walhelm | Light heavyweight | Svensson (SWE); L | Retired; L | did not advance | | | | | —N/a | =21 |
