= Greece at the 1924 Summer Olympics =

- IOC code: GRE
- NOC: Committee of the Olympic Games

in Paris, France
- Competitors: 39
- Flag bearer: Christos Vrettos
- Medals: Gold 0 Silver 0 Bronze 0 Total 0

Summer Olympics appearances (overview)
- 1896; 1900; 1904; 1908; 1912; 1920; 1924; 1928; 1932; 1936; 1948; 1952; 1956; 1960; 1964; 1968; 1972; 1976; 1980; 1984; 1988; 1992; 1996; 2000; 2004; 2008; 2012; 2016; 2020; 2024; 2028

Other related appearances
- 1906 Intercalated Games

Greece competed at the 1924 Summer Olympics in Paris, France. 39 competitors, 38 men and 1 woman, took part in 37 events in 9 sports. Greek athletes did not win any medals, but the gold medal was awarded to sculptor Konstantinos Dimitriadis for his work Discobole Finlandais. Art competitions were part of the Olympic program from 1912 to 1948. A copy of Dimitriadis's sculpture is situated opposite the Panathenaic Stadium in Athens.

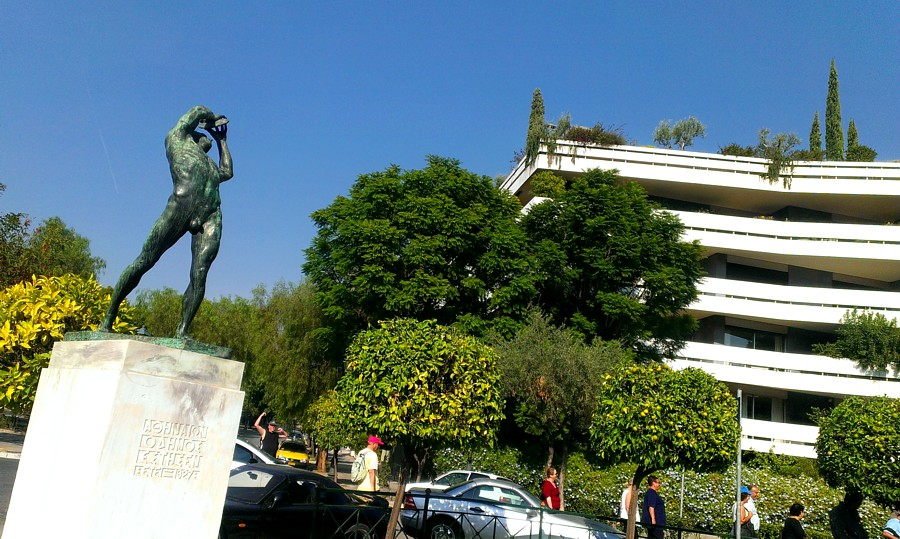
Discobole Finlandais by Konstantinos Dimitriadis, Athens, Greece. The original sculpture is in Randall's Island Park, New York City

== Athletics ==
Twelve athletes represented Greece in 1924. It was the nation's seventh appearance in the sport.
Ranks given are within the heat.

Athlete	Event	Heats		Quarterfinals		Semifinals		Final	
Athlete	Event	Result	Rank	Result	Rank	Result	Rank	Result	Rank
Vyron Athanasiadis	10000 m	N/A						did not finish	
Vyron Athanasiadis	Marathon	N/A						did not finish	
Stelios Benardis	Pentathlon	N/A						Elim-3	
Stelios Benardis	Decathlon	N/A						5189.160	24
Dimitrios Karabatis	Shot put	N/A				10.955	10	did not advance	
Dimitrios Karabatis	Discus throw	N/A				No mark	13	did not advance	
Argyris Karagiannis	Pole vault	N/A				3.20	7	did not advance	
Antonios Karyofyllis	High jump	N/A				1.70	7	did not advance	
Alexandros Kranis	5000 m	N/A				Unknown	7	did not advance	
Alexandros Kranis	10000 m	N/A						did not finish	
Alexandros Kranis	Marathon	N/A						did not finish	
Konstantinos Pantelidis	100 m	Unknown	4	did not advance					
Konstantinos Pantelidis	200 m	Unknown	2 Q	Unknown	6	did not advance			
Konstantinos Pantelidis	Long jump	N/A				5.94	10	did not advance	
Alexandros Papafingos	100 m	Unknown	5	did not advance					
Alexandros Papafingos	200 m	Unknown	3	did not advance					
Iraklis Sakellaropoulos	Marathon	N/A						did not finish	
Ioannis Talianos	110 m hurdles	N/A		16.3	4	did not advance			
Ioannis Talianos	400 m hurdles	N/A		58.0	3	did not advance			
Christos Vrettos	Shot put	N/A				13.125	3	did not advance	
Georgios Zacharopoulos	Discus throw	N/A				34.02	11	did not advance	
Georgios Zacharopoulos	Javelin throw	N/A				51.17	8	did not advance	
Georgios Zacharopoulos	Pentathlon	N/A						did not finish	
Argyris Karagiannis; Konstantinos Pantelidis; Alexandros Papafingos; Ioannis Talianos	4 × 100 m relay	N/A		46.1	2 Q	45.2	4	did not advance	

== Aquatics ==
=== Swimming ===
Ranks given are within the heat.

Men

Swimmer	Event	Heats		Semifinals		Final	
Swimmer	Event	Result	Rank	Result	Rank	Result	Rank
Dionysios Vasilopoulos	100 m freestyle	1:12.0	4	did not advance			
Dionysios Vasilopoulos	400 m freestyle	6:21.4	3	did not advance			
Dionysios Vasilopoulos	1500 m freestyle	26:17.4	4	did not advance			

=== Water polo ===
Greece made its second Olympic water polo appearance.

Roster

- Theodorakis Anastassios
- Andreas Asimakopoulos
- Nikolaos Mavrokordatos Baltatzis
- Georgios Chalkiopoulos
- Nikolaos Kaloudis
- Christos Peppas
- Pantelis Psychas
- Dionysios Vassilopoulos
- E. Vlassis
- C. Vourvoulis

First round

Czechoslovakia	6–1	Greece	Piscine des Tourelles

== Boxing ==
A single boxer represented Greece at the 1924 Games. It was the nation's debut in the sport. Gneftos lost his only bout.

Boxer	Weight class	Round of 32	Round of 16	Quarterfinals	Semifinals	Final / Bronze match	
Boxer	Weight class	Opposition Score	Opposition Score	Opposition Score	Opposition Score	Opposition Score	Rank
Emmanouil Gneftos	Welterweight	Petersen (DEN); L	did not advance				17

Opponent nation	Wins	Losses	Percent
Denmark	0	1	.000
Total	0	1	.000

Round	Wins	Losses	Percent
Round of 32	0	1	.000
Round of 16	0	0	–
Quarterfinals	0	0	–
Semifinals	0	0	–
Final	0	0	–
Bronze match	0	0	–
Total	0	1	.000

== Fencing ==
Six fencers, all men, represented Greece in 1924. It was the nation's fourth appearance in the sport.

Men

Ranks given are within the pool.

Fencer	Event	Round 1		Round 2		Quarterfinals		Semifinals		Final	
Fencer	Event	Result	Rank	Result	Rank	Result	Rank	Result	Rank	Result	Rank
Theodoros Foustanos	Épée	2–6	7	N/A		did not advance					
Theodoros Foustanos	Foil	0–3	4	did not advance							
Ioannis Georgiadis	Sabre	N/A				1–6	8	did not advance			
Konstantinos Kotzias	Sabre	N/A				3–2	2 Q	1–7	9	did not advance	
Konstantinos Nikolopoulos	Épée	4–5	7	N/A		did not advance					
Tryfon Triantafyllakos	Épée	5–4	3 Q	N/A		3–7	9	did not advance			
Ioannis Georgiadis; Konstantinos Kotzias; Konstantinos Nikolopoulos; Tryfon Triantafyllakos	Team sabre	0–2	3	N/A		did not advance					
Konstantinos Kotzias; Konstantinos Nikolopoulos; Evangelos Skotidas (Note: born 1895, date of death unknown; also competed in the 1920 Summer Olympics; father of the 1948 Olympic fencer Andreas Skotidas); Tryfon Triantafyllakos	Team épée	0–2	3	N/A		did not advance					

== Shooting ==
Seven sport shooters represented Greece in 1924. It was the nation's fifth appearance in the sport.

Shooter	Event	Final	
Shooter	Event	Score	Rank
Gerasimos Anagnostou	600 m free rifle	82	24
Georgios Moraitinis	25 m rapid fire pistol	14	37
Georgios Moraitinis	50 m rifle, prone	364	58
Alexandros Theofilakis	25 m rapid fire pistol	16	21
Alexandros Theofilakis	50 m rifle, prone	358	60
Alexandros Theofilakis	600 m free rifle	74	48
Ioannis Theofilakis	25 m rapid fire pistol	13	40
Ioannis Theofilakis	50 m rifle, prone	376	41
Ioannis Theofilakis	600 m free rifle	78	41
Georgios Vafeiadis	25 m rapid fire pistol	7	53
Andreas Vikhos	600 m free rifle	81	31
Georgios Anitsas; Georgios Moraitinis; Alexandros Theofilakis; Ioannis Theofilakis; Andreas Vikhos	Team free rifle	526	12

== Tennis ==
Men

Athlete	Event	Round of 128	Round of 64	Round of 32	Round of 16	Quarterfinals	Semifinals	Final	
Athlete	Event	Opposition Score	Opposition Score	Opposition Score	Opposition Score	Opposition Score	Opposition Score	Opposition Score	Rank
Pantelis Papadopoulos	Singles	Cattaruzza (ARG); L 5–7, 5–7, 1–6	did not advance						
Avgoustos Zerlentis	Singles	Bye	Fyzee (IND); W 6–3, 1–6, 3–6, 6–3, 6–4	de Morpurgo (ITA); L 0–6, 2–6, 4–6	did not advance				
Pantelis Papadopoulos; Avgoustos Zerlentis	Doubles	—N/a	Bye	del Canto / Lozano (MEX); W 6–2, 6–3, 4–6, 6–2	J. Alonso / M. Alonso (ESP); L 2–6, 7–9, 4–6	did not advance			

Women

Athlete	Event	Round of 64	Round of 32	Round of 16	Quarterfinals	Semifinals	Final	
Athlete	Event	Opposition Score	Opposition Score	Opposition Score	Opposition Score	Opposition Score	Opposition Score	Rank
Lena Valaoritou-Skaramaga	Singles	Bye	Polley (IND); L 6–1, 3–6, 2–6	did not advance				

Mixed

Athlete	Event	Round of 32	Round of 16	Quarterfinals	Semifinals	Final	
Athlete	Event	Opposition Score	Opposition Score	Opposition Score	Opposition Score	Opposition Score	Rank
Lena Valaoritou-Skaramaga; Avgoustos Zerlentis	Doubles	Dahl / Langaard (NOR); W 4–6, 6–2, 6–2	Wightman / Williams (USA); L 2–6, 1–6	did not advance			

== Wrestling ==
=== Greco-Roman ===
Men's

Athlete	Event	First round	Second round	Third round	Fourth round	Fifth round	Sixth round	Seventh round	Eighth round	Rank
Athlete	Event	Opposition Result	Opposition Result	Opposition Result	Opposition Result	Opposition Result	Opposition Result	Opposition Result	Opposition Result	Rank
Vasilios Pavlidis	Lightweight	Rękawek (POL); L	Askehave (DEN); L	did not advance				—N/a		=20
Georgios Zervinis	Bantamweight	Martinsen (NOR); L	van Maaren (NED); L	did not advance				—N/a		=17
