= Water polo at the 1924 Summer Olympics =

Men's water polo at the Games of the VIII Olympiad
- Venue: Paris
- Dates: 13–20 July
- Competitors: 101 from 13 nations

Medalists
1st place, gold medalist(s)		France; France
2nd place, silver medalist(s)		Belgium; Belgium
3rd place, bronze medalist(s)		United States; United States

Final results for the water polo tournament at the 1924 Summer Olympics. All medals were decided by using the Bergvall system.

== Medal summary ==
Gold	Silver	Bronze
France; Albert Deborgies; Noël Delberghe; Robert Desmettre; Paul Dujardin; Albert Mayaud; Henri Padou; Georges Rigal R. Bertrand; A. Fasani; Jean Lasquin; L. Perol	Belgium; Gérard Blitz; Maurice Blitz; Joseph Cludts; Joseph de Combe; Pierre Dewin; Albert Durant; Georges Fleurix; Paul Gailly; Joseph Pletinckx; Jules Thiry; Jean-Pierre Vermetten	United States; Arthur Austin; Oliver Horn; Fred Lauer; George Mitchell; John Norton; Wally O'Connor; George Schroth; Herb Vollmer; Johnny Weissmuller Elmer Collett; Jam Handy

Note: The players above the line played at least one game in this tournament, the players below the line were reserve players and did not compete in this tournament. Nevertheless the International Olympic Committee medal database exclusively credits them all as medalists. However the official report did not even count them as competitors.

== Results ==
First Round
France	3
United States	1
Netherlands	7
Switzerland	0
Sweden	7
Italy	0
Spain
bye
bye
Belgium
Hungary	7
Great Britain	6
Czechoslovakia	6
Greece	1
(Republic of Ireland) Ireland
Austria

Quarterfinals
France	6
Netherlands	3
Sweden	9
Spain	0
Belgium	7
Hungary	2
Czechoslovakia	4
(Republic of Ireland) Ireland	2

Semifinals
France	4
Sweden	2
Belgium	5
Czechoslovakia	1

Final
France (gold)	3
Belgium	0

=== Silver medal tournament ===
Semifinals
United States	4
Netherlands	2
Sweden	3
Belgium	4

Silver Medal Final
United States	1
Belgium (silver)	2

=== Bronze medal tournament ===
Quarterfinals		Semifinals		Bronze Medal Final
Hungary	7
Czechoslovakia	0	Hungary	1
		Sweden	4
				Sweden	2
				United States (bronze)	3
		United States

== Participating nations ==
Each country was allowed to enter a team of 11 players and they all were eligible for participation. Austria withdrew without playing a match. A total of 101 water polo players from 13 nations competed at the Paris Games:

- Belgium (11)
- Czechoslovakia (9)
- France (7)
- Great Britain (7)
- Greece (7)
- Hungary (8)
- Ireland (7)
- Italy (7)
- Netherlands (7)
- Spain (7)
- Sweden (8)
- Switzerland (7)
- United States (9)

== Summary ==
Place	Nation
1	France Albert Delborgies; Noël Delberghe; Robert Desmettre; Paul Dujardin; Albert Mayaud; Henri Padou; Georges Rigal R. Bertrand; A. Fasani; Jean Lasquin; L. Perol
2	Belgium Gérard Blitz; Maurice Blitz; Joseph Cludts; Joseph de Combe; Pierre Dewin; Albert Durant; Georges Fleurix; Paul Gailly; Joseph Pletinckx; Jules Thiry; Jean-Pierre Vermetten
3	United States Arthur Austin; Oliver Horn; Fred Lauer; George Mitchell; John Norton; Wally O'Connor; George Schroth; Herb Vollmer; Johnny Weissmuller Elmer Collett; Jam Handy Coach: Otto Wahle
4	Sweden Cletus Andersson (SK Neptun); Erik Andersson (Stockholms KK); Vilhelm Andersson (SK Neptun); Nils Backlund (SK Neptun); Theodor Nauman (Stockholms KK); Martin Norberg (Stockholms KK); Gösta Persson (Stockholms KK); Hilmar Wictorin (SK Neptun) S. Friberg; Erik Skoglund; Nils Skoglund
5	Hungary István Barta (III. ker TVE); Tibor Fazekas (FTC); Lajos Homonnai (III. ker TVE); Márton Homonnai (III. ker TVE); Alajos Keserű (FTC); Ferenc Keserű (III. ker TVE); József Vértesy (FTC); János Wenk (FTC) A. Ivády; F. Kann; B. Nagy
6	Czechoslovakia Ladislav Ankert; Frantšek Franěk; Jan Hora; Hugo Klempfner; František Kůrka; Vojtech Neményi; Jiří Reitman; Josef Tomášek; František Vacín František Černík; J. Humelhans
7	Netherlands Gé Bohlander; Willy Bohlander; Willem Bokhoven; Jan den Boer; Sjaak Köhler; Karel Struijs; Han van Senus A. Goedings; Abraham van Olst; Pieter van Senus; R. van Senus
8	Great Britain Harold Annison; John Budd; Charles Bugbee; Richard Hodgson; Arthur Hunt; Paul Radmilovic; Charles Sydney Smith D. Edward; R. Haston; William Peacock
9	Ireland Stewart Barrett; James Beckett; James S. Brady; Pat Convery; Charles Fagan; Michael A. O'Connor; Noel M.J. Purcell William J. Fagan; Norman N. Judd; Joseph O'Connor
10	Spain Manuel Basté; Jaime Cruells; José Fontanet; Francisco Gibert; Luis Gibert; Enrique Granados Gal; José María Puig A. Bretos; J. Trigo; Mariano Trigo; Alfonso Tusell Alonso
11	Italy Tito Ambrosini (Doria); Mario Balla (Doria); Arnoldo Berruti (Sturla); Mario Cazzaniga (R.N. Milano); Eugenio Della Casa (Doria); Achille Gavoglio (Doria); Giuseppe Valle (Sturla) Ottone Andreancich (R.N. Milano); Gian Battista Benvenuto; Emilio Gavoglio; Carmine De Luca (138ª Legione)
12	Switzerland Charles Biefer; Henri Demiéville; Robert Girod; Charles Kopp; Albert Mondet; Fernand Moret; Robert Wyss Armand Boppart; P. Renevier; H. Rich; René Ricolfi-Doria
13	Greece Anastasios Theodorakis; Andreas Asimakopoulos; Nikolaos Baltatzis-Mavrokordatos; Georgios Khalkiopoulos; Nikolaos Kaloudis; Pantelis Psychas; Dionysios Vasilopoulos Christos Peppas; E. Vlassis; C. Vourvoulis

== Sources ==
- PDF documents in the LA84 Foundation Digital Library:
  - Official Report of the 1924 Olympic Games (download, archive) (pp. 439–440, 486–494)
- Water polo on the Olympedia website
  - Water polo at the 1924 Summer Olympics (men's tournament)
- Water polo on the Sports Reference website
  - Water polo at the 1924 Summer Games (men's tournament) (archived)
