= Arnoldo Berruti =

Italian water polo player (1902–1967)

Aroldo Berruti
Personal information
- Full name: Aroldo Giovanni Battista Berruti
- Nationality: Italian
- Born: 23 December 1902 Genoa, Kingdom of Italy
- Died: 25 May 1967 (aged 64) Genoa, Italy

Sport
- Sport: Water polo

Aroldo Berruti (23 December 1902 – 25 May 1967) was an Italian water polo player. He competed in the men's tournament with the national Italian team alongside his team-mates Tito Ambrosini, Mario Balla, Mario Cazzaniga, Eugenio Della Casa, Achille Gavoglio and Giuseppe Valle at the 1924 Summer Olympics.

Berruti was a member of the water polo section of the Gymnastic Society of Andrea Doria, and helped his team win eight national titles in 1921, 1922, 1925, 1926, 1927, 1928, 1930, and 1931.
