= John Norton (water polo) =

American water polo player (1899–1987)

Personal information
- Born: November 27, 1899 New York City, United States
- Died: November 24, 1987 (aged 88) Lebanon, Pennsylvania, United States

Sport
- Sport: Water polo
- Club: Chicago Athletic Association
Medal record
Representing United States
Olympic Games
Bronze medal – third place	1924 Paris	Team competition

John Bayes Norton (November 27, 1899 – November 24, 1987), listed as John Dominic Norton by Olympedia, was an American water polo player who competed in the 1924 Summer Olympics, where he won the bronze medal with the American water polo team, participating in three matches and scoring a total of three goals.

Norton was born November 24, 1899 in New York City to John and Winifred Goodwilly Norton, according to one obituary source, although his cited name was John Dominic Norton, as listed in wikipedia.

During WWI, Norton served in the Coast Guard, from around May 1918 through June 1919 according to the source Olympedia.

== 1924 Olympics ==
Serving as a 1924 Olympic try-out, Norton was chosen for the U.S. Olympic team after playing around late March-April, 1924, at the National Water Polo Championships in Chicago, Illinois. The U.S. Olympic committee selections included San Francisco Olympic club members Arthur Austin, George Mitchell, George Schroth and Charles Elmer Collett. Though funds were lacking initially for their trip to Paris, by early June most of the Olympic team members were told to report to New York where they would gather with other U.S. Water Polo team members before sailing for Paris.

In mid-July 1924, Norton was part of the U.S. water polo team which won the bronze medal. Norton played in three matches, scoring a total of three goals. In an unexpected turn of events, including to the French audience, France defeated Belgium in the final round, 3-0, to capture the gold medal. Belgium, after defeating Sweden by a score of 4-3, then faced the United States for the silver-medal in a semi-final round. Belgium beat the US by a score of 2-1. The American team filed a protest, but the Belgium team still captured the silver medal in the replay by the same score, 2-1.

In 1926, Norton, listed as John D. Norton, was on the Chicago Athletic Association team that defeated the Illinois Athletic Club, winning the AAU National Water Polo Championship in a double overtime match by a score of 7-6 on April 9, 1926, held at the Illinois Athletic Club. Norton's water position was listed as LF, or Left Forward, an offensive position usually corresponding to a Left Wing or Left Driver. Ralph Breyer, 1924 Olympic medalist in the 4x200 meter freestyle relay, was listed as playing for the winning Chicago Athletic Association team. Olympian Harry C. Daniels was also listed as playing for the winning Chicago Athletic Association team. According to Olympedia, Norton was also on the Chicago Athletic Association water polo team that won the AAU National Championship in 1928.

He died in Lebanon, Pennsylvania on November 24, 1987, and according to one obituary was survived by his son John D. Norton III. He may have worked for a period as a clothing salesman for Capper and Capper in Chicago.

== See also ==
- List of Olympic medalists in water polo (men)
