= Berruti =

Berruti is an Italian surname. Prominent individuals with this surname include:

- Alejandro Berruti (1888–1964), Argentine playwright
- Arnoldo Berruti (1902–1967), Italian water polo player
- Giulio Berruti (born 1984), Italian actor
- Livio Berruti (born 1939), Italian sprint runner
- Rómulo Berruti (1937–2026), Argentine journalist
- Valerio Berruti (born 1977), Italian artist
