= Gérard Blitz =

Gérard Blitz may refer to:

- Gérard Blitz (swimmer) (1901–1979), Belgian swimming and water polo Olympic medalist
- Gérard Blitz (entrepreneur) (1912–1990), Belgian entrepreneur, founder of Club Med
