= Ankert =

Ankert is a German surname. Notable people with the surname include:

- Ladislav Ankert (1902–1940), Czech water polo player
- Torsten Ankert (born 1988), German ice hockey player
