= Pat Convery =

Pat Convery may refer to:

- Pat Convery (water polo) (1896–1968), Irish water polo player
- Pat Convery (politician), Lord Mayor of Belfast 2010–2011
