= Vasilopoulos =

Vasilopoulos or Vassilopoulos (Greek: Βασιλόπουλος) is a Greek surname. The feminine form is Vasilopoulou (Βασιλοπούλου). It may refer to:

- Balanos Vasilopoulos (1694–1760), Greek scholar, cleric and writer
- Christos Vasilopoulos (born 1978), Greek actor
- Christos Vasilopoulos (footballer) (born 1962), Greek professional footballer
- Dionysios Vasilopoulos (1902–1964), Greek swimmer
- Fotios Vasilopoulos (born 1986), Greek professional basketball player
- Panagiotis Vasilopoulos (born 1984), Greek basketball player

== See also ==
- Alfa-Beta Vassilopoulos, Greek supermarket chain
