= Márton Homonnai =

Hungarian water polo player

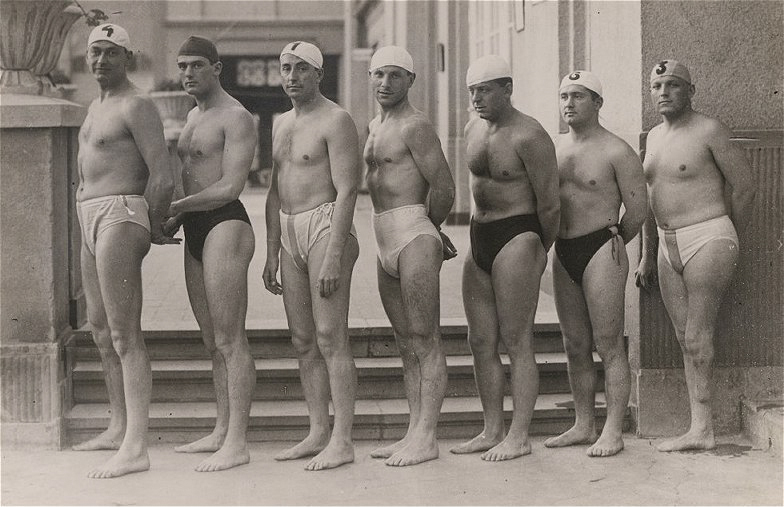

Personal information
- Born: 5 February 1906 Budapest, Hungary
- Died: 15 October 1969 (aged 63) Buenos Aires, Argentina

Sport
- Sport: Water polo
- Club: III. kerületi TVE, Budapest; MTK, Budapest
Medal record
Olympic Games
Gold medal – first place	1932 Los Angeles	Team competition
Gold medal – first place	1936 Berlin	Team competition
Silver medal – second place	1928 Amsterdam	Team competition

Márton Homonnai (5 February 1906 – 15 October 1969), also known as Márton Hlavacsek, was a Hungarian water polo player who won two gold and one silver medals at the 1928, 1932 and the 1936 Summer Olympics; his team finished fifth in 1924. During his career Homonnai played 115 international matches, often alongside his brother Lajos. His daughter Katalin Szőke became an Olympic swimmer.

During World War II Homonnai was a policeman and a member of the Arrow Cross Party, which supported the Nazis. After the war, fearing prosecution (he was sentenced to death in absentia), he flew via Germany and Brazil to Argentina, where he died in 1969.

== See also ==
- Hungary men's Olympic water polo team records and statistics
- List of Olympic champions in men's water polo
- List of Olympic medalists in water polo (men)
- List of players who have appeared in multiple men's Olympic water polo tournaments
- List of members of the International Swimming Hall of Fame
