= Willy Bohlander =

Dutch water polo player (1891–1939)

Personal information
- Full name: Frederik Wilhelm Bohlander
- Nationality: Netherlands
- Born: 8 August 1891 Amsterdam, the Netherlands
- Died: 26 August 1939 (aged 48) Amsterdam, the Netherlands

Sport
- Sport: Water polo

Senior clubs
- Years: Team
- –: Het Y, Amsterdam
National team
- Years: Team
- ?-?: Netherlands

Frederik Wilhelm "Willy" Bohlander (8 August 1891 – 26 August 1939) was a Dutch male water polo player. He was a member of the Netherlands men's national water polo team. He competed with the team at the 1924 Summer Olympics.

His brother, Gé Bohlander, was also a water polo player and competed for the national team at the 1920 and 1924 Summer Olympics.
