= Jan den Boer =

Dutch water polo player (1889–1944)

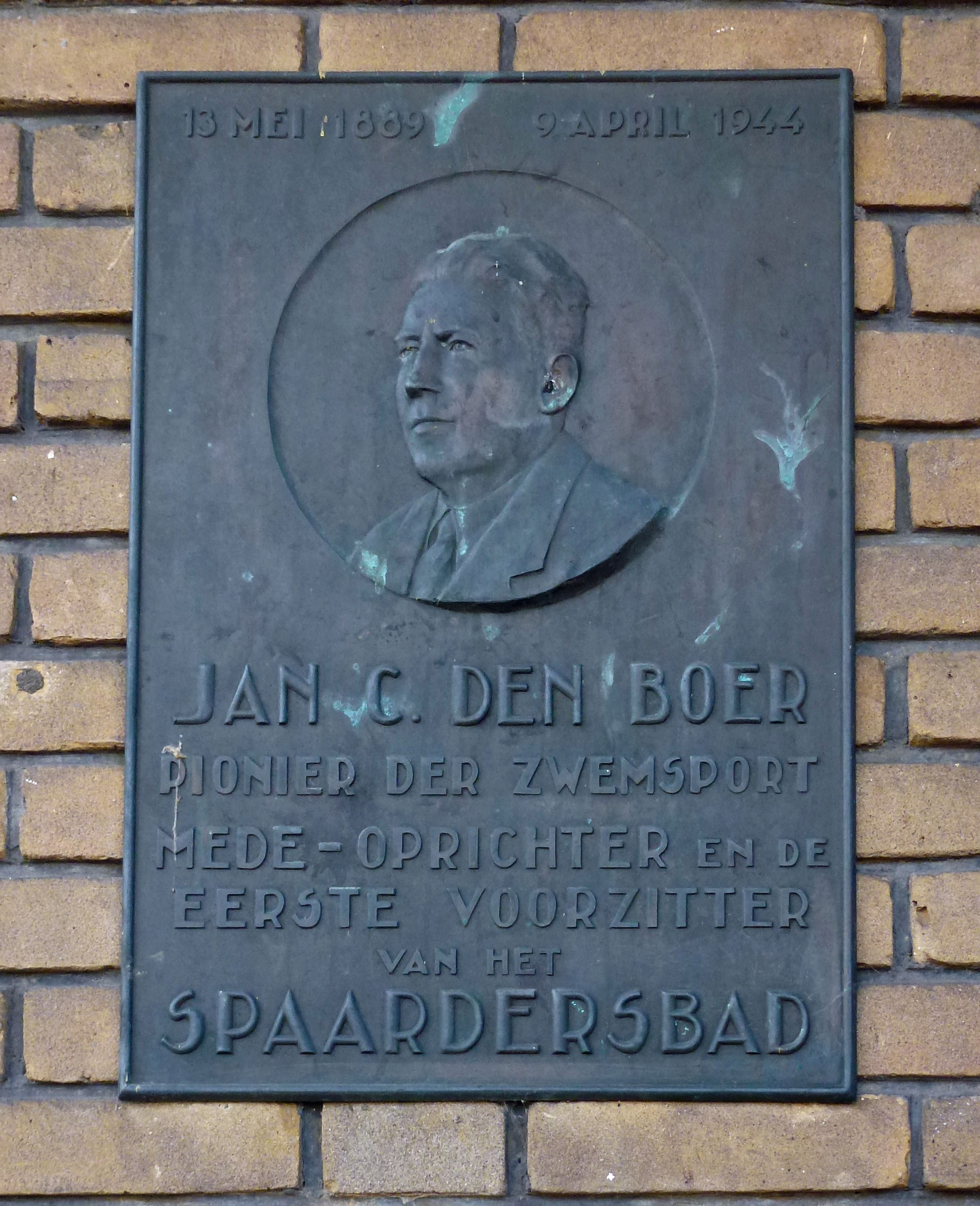

Personal information
- Full name: Jan Cornelis den Boer
- Nationality: Netherlands
- Born: 13 May 1889 Gouda, the Netherlands
- Died: 9 April 1944 (aged 54) Gouda, the Netherlands

Sport
- Sport: Water polo

Senior clubs
- Years: Team
- –: GZC
- –: Gouda
National team
- Years: Team
- ?-?: Netherlands

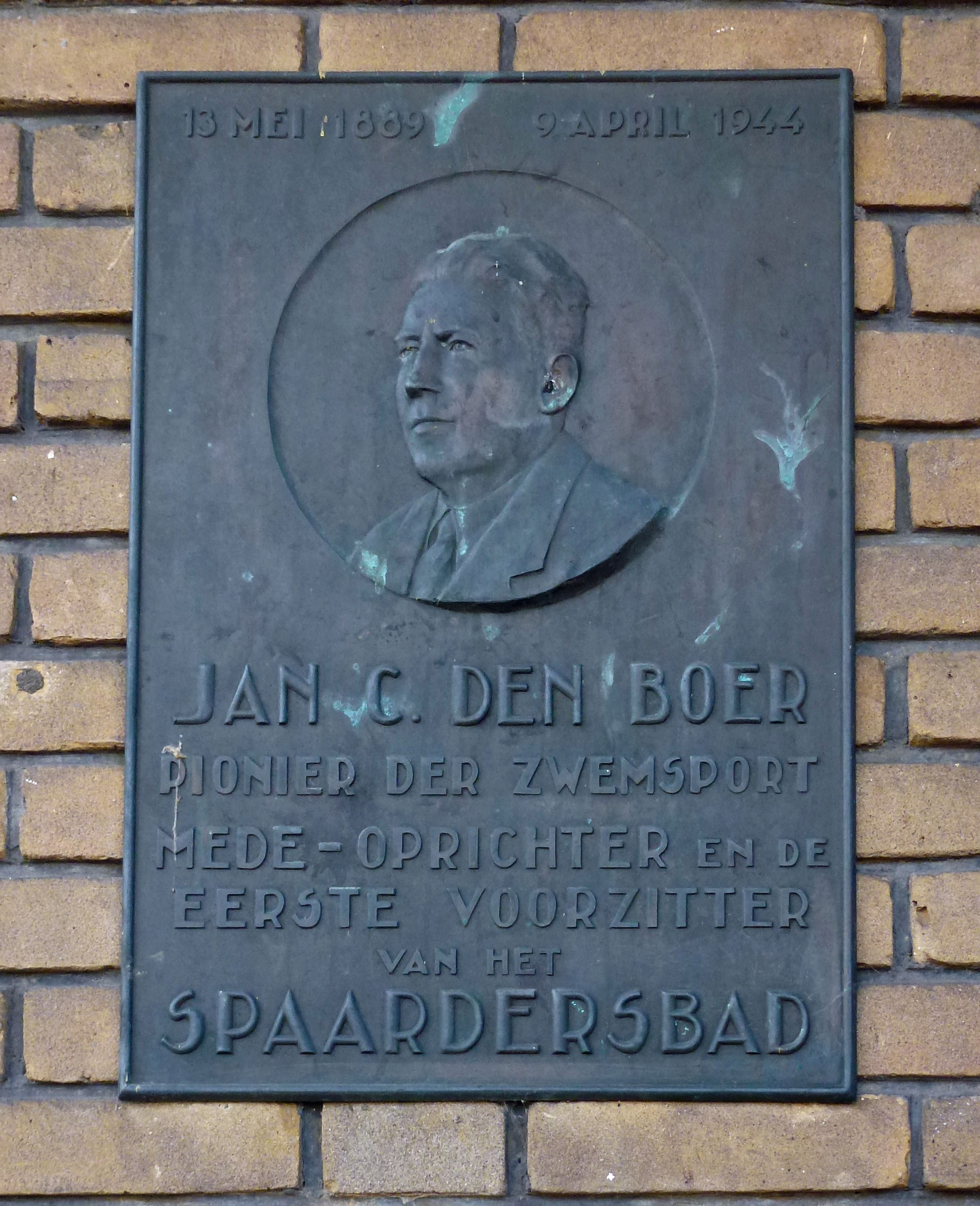

Jan Cornelis den Boer (13 May 1889 – 9 April 1944) was a Dutch male water polo player. He was a member of the Netherlands men's national water polo team. He competed with the team at the 1924 Summer Olympics.
