= Manuel Basté =

Spanish water polo player (1899–1977)

Personal information
- Nationality: Spanish
- Born: 18 June 1899; Barcelona, Spain
- Died: 4 December 1977 (aged 78); Barcelona, Spain

Sport
- Sport: Water polo

Manuel Basté (18 June 1899 – 4 December 1977) was a Spanish water polo player. He competed in the men's tournament at the 1924 Summer Olympics.
