= Hugo Klempfner =

Czech water polo player (1902–1969)

Personal information
- Nationality: Czech
- Born: 6 January 1902; Prague, Austria-Hungary
- Died: 1 February 1969 (aged 67); Melbourne, Australia

Sport
- Sport: Water polo

Hugo Klempfner (6 January 1902 – 1 February 1969) was a Czech water polo player. He competed in the men's tournament at the 1924 Summer Olympics.
