= Oliver Horn =

American water polo player (1901–1960)

- Horn in the 1920's wearing his Illinois Athletic Club Jersey

Personal information
- National team: USA
- Born: June 22, 1901 St. Louis, Missouri, United States
- Died: October 10, 1960 (aged 59) Gross Ile Township, Michigan
- Occupations: VP, Jam Handy Organization. Instructional Video Presentations
- Height: 178 cm (5 ft 10 in)
- Spouse: Frances Gibson Horn
- Children: Daughter

Sport
- Sport: Water polo
- Club: Missouri Athletic Club (MAC); Illinois Athletic Club (IAC)
- Coached by: Carl Bauer (MAC); Bill Bachrach (IAC, '24 Olympics)
Medal record
Representing United States
Olympic Games
Bronze medal – third place	1924 Paris	Team competition

Oliver A. Horn (June 22, 1901 – October 10, 1960) was an American water polo player who competed for the Illinois Athletic Club and participated in the 1924 Summer Olympics in Paris, where he won a team bronze medal in the 1924 Men's Olympic water polo team competition, playing all five matches. In his career, he was an Executive Vice-President for the Jam Handy Organization, a Detroit-based producer of instructional visual presentations.

Oliver Horn was born June 22, 1901 in St. Louis, Missouri. At age 12, he began competing for St. Louis's Missouri Athletic Club (MAC) under Head Coach Carl Bauer, where in May, 1919, he placed second in the 220-yard handicap swim at the M.A.C.'s invitational meet. In January 1920, Horn was invited to represent the strong Illinois Athletic Club after taking third place in his signature event, the 220 yard swim, and second place in his strongest event, the 100-yard backstroke, at an Illinois Athletic Club Invitational meet.

== Illinois Athletic Club ==
In April, 1923, representing the Illinois Athletic Club in the 150-yard backstroke, Horn placed second to Johnny Weismuller, who swam an AAU record of 1:42 for the event. At the Illinois Athletic Club, in greater Chicago, Horn was coached in both water polo and swimming by Hall of Fame Coach Bill Bachrach. Representing the Chicago Athletic Club at the April, 1924 AAU Championships, Horn won the 150-yard backstroke in a time of 1:47.8. Horn was a member of the Illinois Athletic Club team that won the National AAU Water Polo Championships in 1924, 1927, and 1930.

== 1924 Paris Olympic bronze ==
At the 1924 Summer Olympics in Paris, Horn was part of the U.S. team that won the bronze medal in the Olympic Men's Water Polo team competition. He participated in all of the five matches played by the U.S. team. In the tournament to determine second place, Belgium beat Sweden 4-3, and then played the U.S. team in a match to determine the silver medal. Belgium beat the U.S. team with a 2-1 score initially, but the Americans filed a protest. In a replay of the game, Belgium again won the silver medal by the same score. Hungary, Czechoslovakia, and Sweden met in the third-place tournament. Sweden defeated both Hungary and Czechoslovakia, and played the U.S. team for the bronze, but in an unexpected victory, America won against the Swedish team by a score of 3-2. France took the gold medal before the home crowd, Belgium took the silver medal, and the U.S. won the bronze in their upset against the team from Sweden.

Not long after the Olympics, Horn married Frances Gibson of Webster Grove, Missouri, around June 1926. The couple planned to live in Chicago.

=== Careers ===
In his early career, Horn worked for the Chicago Daily Journal for a two year period. In his primary career, he served with the Detroit-based Jam Handy Organization, ascending to the role of Executive Vice President. Jam Handy is a film studio that produces visual instructional presentations for the military, education and industry. Jam Handy was founded by Horn's fellow Olympic swimmer and water polo player Henry Jamison "Jam" Handy. In his spare time, Horn later belonged to the Detroit Boat Club and the Detroit Athletic Club.

He died on the evening of October 10, 1960 at his home on Lakewood, in Grosse Ile, Michigan. Services were held at Jefferson Avenue Presbyterian Church, and he was buried at Woodlawn Cemetery. He was survived by his wife Francis Gibson Horn and daughter Thomas Elizabeth Horn.

== See also ==
- List of Olympic medalists in water polo (men)
