= Vojtech Neményi =

Slovak water polo player (1899–1945)

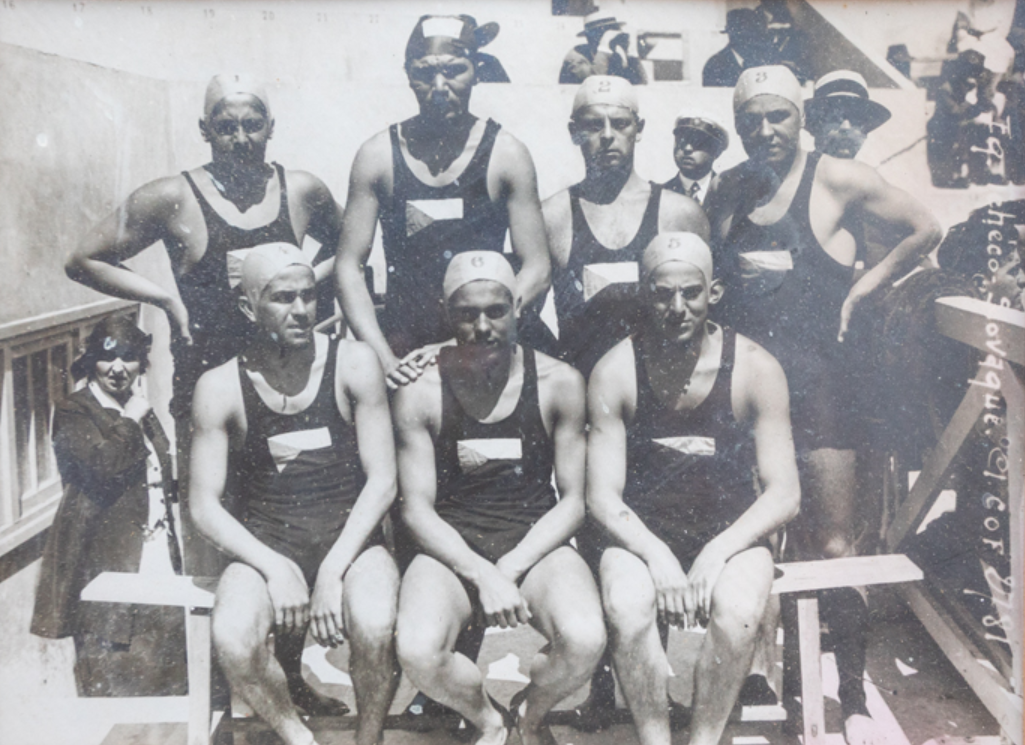
- Czechoslovak water polo team at the 1924 Olympics. Vojtech Neményi standing 3rd from left.

Personal information
- Nickname: Béla
- Nationality: Slovak
- Born: 1 August 1899 Kassa, Kingdom of Hungary, Austria-Hungary (today Košice, Slovakia)
- Died: 7 April 1945 (aged 45) Bratislava, Czechoslovakia
- Occupation: Civil engineer

Sport
- Country: Czechoslovakia
- Sport: Water polo, swimming
- Club: KAC Košice (until 1923, 1925-1930); APK Praha (1923-25)
- Coached by: Ľudovít Stahl

Vojtech Neményi (1 August 1899 – 7 April 1945) was an Olympic water polo player and swimmer. He represented Czechoslovakia and competed in the men's tournament at the 1924 Summer Olympics.

== Biography ==
Vojtech Neményi was born in 1899 in Košice, into the family of an East Slovak lawyer and sports official of Jewish origin, Dr. Vilmos Neményi. He started playing sports with his younger brother Gejza in the Košice club Kassai Atléticai Club (KAC). The KAC club was a member of Hungarian sports associations until 1923, when the Slovak county Czechoslovak amateur swimming association was established.

After the First World War, he studied technology in Prague and in 1923 transferred to the Prague swimming club APK Praha. As a member of APK, he competed in 1924 with the water polo players representative team at the Olympic Games in Paris. After finishing his studies in 1925, he returned to Košice, where he did business in the automobile industry.

He died under unclear circumstances in the spring of 1945. According to one account, he was killed while escaping from a transport to concentration camp Engerau. He is buried in a cemetery in Petržalka.

== Honours ==
=== Olympic Games ===
- 1924 — 6th place

=== Slovak Championship ===
- 1920 — 1st place
