= Gé Bohlander =

Dutch water polo player (1895–1940)

Personal information
- Full name: Gérard Bohlander
- Nationality: Netherlands
- Born: 5 November 1895 Amsterdam, the Netherlands
- Died: 18 December 1940 (aged 45) Kelpen, the Netherlands

Sport
- Sport: Water polo

Senior clubs
- Years: Team
- –: Het Y, Amsterdam
National team
- Years: Team
- ?-?: Netherlands

Gérard "Gé" Bohlander (5 November 1895 – 18 December 1940) was a Dutch male water polo player. He was a member of the Netherlands men's national water polo team. He competed with the team at the 1920 Summer Olympics and 1924 Summer Olympics.

His brother, Willy Bohlander, was also a water polo player and competed for the national team also at the 1924 Summer Olympics.

Bohlander died in December 1940 due to the complications after a car accident.
