= Jimmy Brady =

Irish water polo player

Personal information
- Full name: James Stewart Brady
- Nationality: Irish
- Born: 1901
- Died: 21 February 1976 (aged 74–75)

Sport
- Sport: Water polo

Jimmy Brady (1901 – 21 February 1976) was an Irish water polo player. He competed in the men's tournament at the 1924 Summer Olympics.
