= Josef Tomášek =

Czech water polo player (1904–1979)

Personal information
- Nationality: Czech
- Born: 10 March 1904; Prague, Austria-Hungary
- Died: 15 April 1979 (aged 75); Prague, Czechoslovakia

Sport
- Sport: Water polo

Josef Tomášek (10 March 1904 – 15 April 1979) was a Czech water polo player. He competed in the men's tournament at the 1924 Summer Olympics.
