= Herb Vollmer =

American water polo player (1895–1961)

Herbert Vollmer
- Vollmer in his youth

Personal information
- Nickname: "Herb"
- National team: USA
- Born: Herbert Eberhard Jordan Vollmer; February 15, 1895 New York City, United States
- Died: November 8, 1961 (aged 66) New York City, United States
- Occupation: Real Estate broker

Sport
- Sport: Swimming, Water polo
- College team: Columbia University
- Club: New York Athletic Club (NYAC)
- Coached by: Edward T. Kennedy (Columbia); Otto Wahle (NYAC, '20 Olympics)
Medal record
Representing United States
Olympic Games
Bronze medal – third place	1924 Paris	Team competition

Herbert "Herb" Eberhard Jordan Vollmer (February 15, 1895 – November 8, 1961) was an American swimmer and water polo player who competed for Columbia University and represented the United States in water polo at the 1920 Summer Olympics in Antwerp, Belgium, later winning a team bronze medal at the 1924 Summer Olympics in Paris. Competing in water polo at a high level through 1939 with the New York Athletic Club, Vollmer had a successful career as a real estate broker in New York.

Herbert Vollmer was born February 15, 1885 in New York City to parents Charles F. and Gertrude Eberhard Vollmer, and graduated from Stuyvesant High School in Manhattan.

== Columbia University ==
Graduating in 1918, Volmer swam and played water polo while attending Columbia University, where he was trained and managed by Hall of Fame Coach Edward T. Kennedy, who coached both water polo and swimming at Columbia from 1910-1955. Highly accomplished in the swimming community, Kennedy managed the U.S. men's Olympic swim teams in both 1936 and 1952, was an NCAA rules committee chairperson, and helped found the International Swimming Hall of Fame.

While swimming for Columbia, Vollmer was an Intercollegiate 4A champion in both 1915 and 1916. A highly accomplished swimmer during his era, Vollmer captured six consecutive titles in intercollegiate competition in both the 100 and 200 yard freestyle events. As a freshman, Vollmer captured every freestyle record spanning the distance from 440 to 100 yards. In 1916, he helped establish outdoor freestyle world records in the 150 and 220 yard distances, as well as the longer 500. A multi-sport athlete, Volmer played football, often as a right tackle, and ran track at Columbia.

== Early records ==
In January, 1916, during a meet at the New York Athletic Club, Vollmer broke the greater New York metropolitan record for the 100-yard swim with a time of 55.2 seconds.

In an important achievement in his swimming career on February 17, 1916, he established what were then recorded as three world indoor swimming records on his way to winning the New York Metropolitan 220-yard swimming championship held at the New York Athletic Club. He set a new record for the 220-yard swim of 2:24.8, and a new record for the 200 meters, an established Olympic event, of 2:23.8.

In WWI, Vollmer served as a U.S. Naval Lieutenant, first entering the service around May, 1917. For a period through 1918, while commissioned as an Ensign, he served as an instructor at the Pelham Bay School, a WWI error training center for seaman and officers, where he was able to continue his own training at facilities in Long Island Sound, and compete for his naval station, before returning to competitive swimming in civilian life.

Vollmer had a long career competing in swimming and water polo at the New York Athletic Club where he captained the team in the 1924-5 seasons, and was managed and trained by Hall of Fame Coach Otto Wahle, a former Olympic medalist. A 1904 gold medalist in both swimming and water polo, Joe Ruddy also served as a coach at the NYAC in both sports, while also competing in water polo in his earlier coaching years. In a summary of his accomplishments with water polo teams, he was part of the AAU Sr. National Championship Team for indoor competition in the years 1922, 1929, 1931, 1935-36, and in 1920 for the AAU indoor Jr. National Championship Team. In the New York area, in 1924, and 1927, he was part of the AAU Sr. Metropolitan Championship Team.

== 1920-1924 Olympics ==
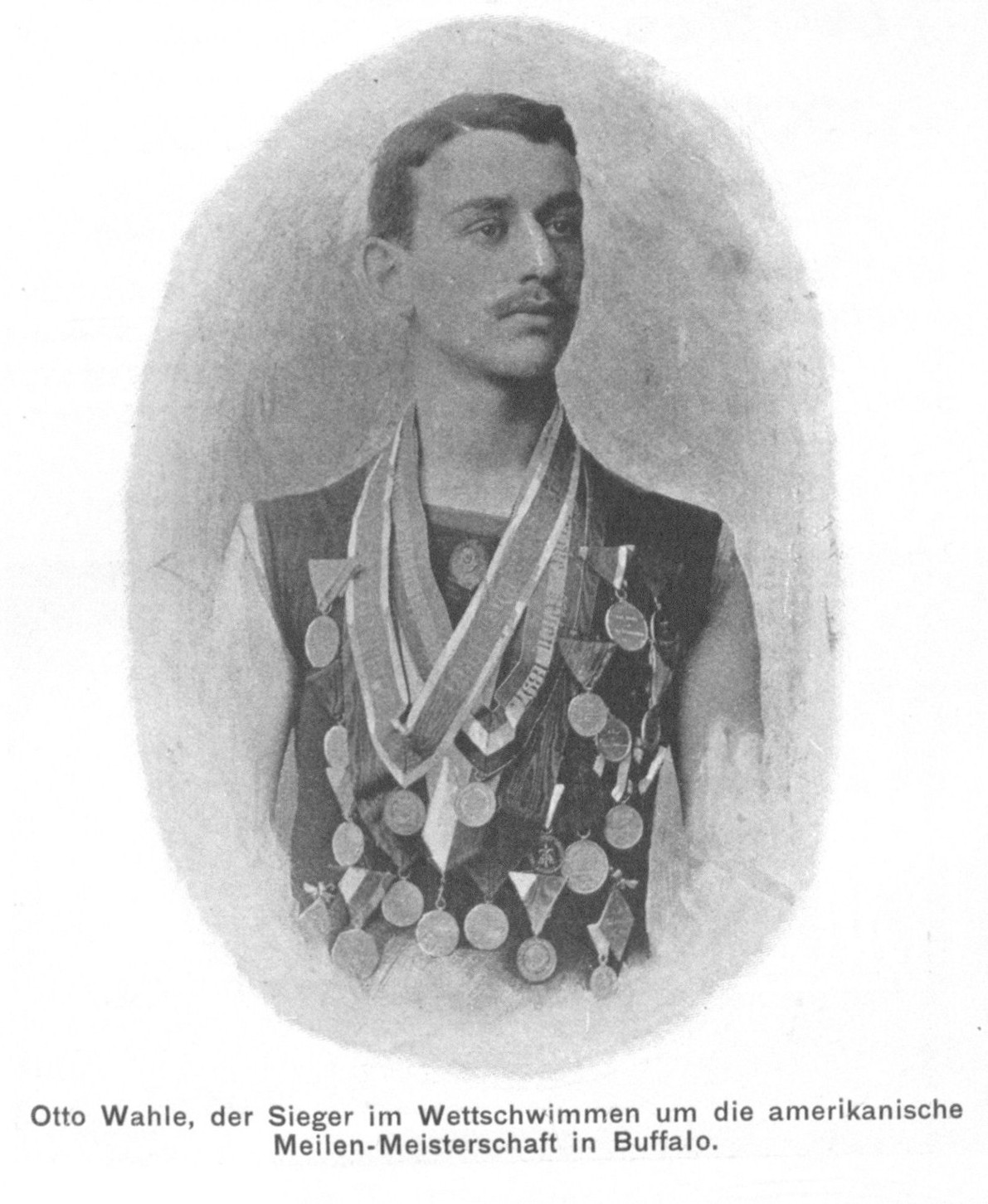
Otto Wahle, 1901

In 1920 he was a member of the American team in the water polo competition at the Olympics in Antwerp, Belgium where the American team was trained and managed by Vollmer's former coach at the New York Athletic Club, Otto Wahle. The U.S. team placed fourth, with the British team taking the gold, the home team Belgium taking the silver, and Sweden taking the bronze medal. Vollmer played in three matches.

=== Olympic bronze medal ===
Four years later, in the 1924 Paris Olympic Water Polo Team competition, Vollmer won the bronze medal with the American water polo team, with the hometown team France taking the gold, and Belgium taking the silver. Vollmer participated in all five matches played by the U.S. team and scored three goals. Other members of the 1924 water polo team included film star and Olympic medalist Johnny Weissmuller, and Water Polo Hall of famer Wally O'Connor, an olympic medalist in both swimming and water polo.

Vollmer continued to compete with the New York Athletic Club water polo team that in 1929 captured the American Athletic Union title. Still active with the New York Athletic Club through the age of 41, from 1931-1936 he played on five NYAA Club teams that won AAU indoor championships.

In 1976, he was inducted into the USA Water Polo Hall of Fame, and held the more distinctive honor of being admitted to the International Swimming Hall of Fame as a Pioneer swimmer in 1990.

In his professional career, Vollmer became a successful broker of real estate, and grew prosperous.

Vollmer died on November 8, 1961 in New York at the age of 66, and was buried in All Faiths Cemetery in Middle Village, Queens, New York.

== See also ==
- List of Olympic medalists in water polo (men)
- List of members of the International Swimming Hall of Fame
