= Jiří Reitman =

Czech water polo player (1905–1945)

Personal information
- Nationality: Czech
- Born: 21 June 1905 Prague, Czechoslovakia
- Died: 4 January 1945 (aged 39) Auschwitz, German-occupied Poland

Sport
- Sport: Water polo

Jiří Reitman (21 June 1905 – 4 January 1945) was a Czech water polo player. He competed in the men's tournament at the 1924 Summer Olympics.
