= Stewart Barrett =

Irish water polo player (1901–1982)

Personal information
- Nationality: Irish
- Born: 5 October 1901
- Died: 15 January 1982 (aged 80); Dublin, Ireland

Sport
- Sport: Water polo

Charles Stewart Barrett (5 October 1901 – 15 January 1982) was an Irish water polo player. He competed in the men's tournament at the 1924 Summer Olympics.

Barrett played for the Clontarf Waterpolo Club.
