= Robert Girod =

Swiss water polo player

Personal information
- Nationality: Swiss
- Born: 1901

Sport
- Sport: Water polo

Robert Girod (born 1901, date of death unknown) was a Swiss water polo player. He competed in the men's tournament at the 1924 Summer Olympics.
