= František Kůrka =

Czech water polo player (1903–1952)

Personal information
- Nationality: Czech
- Born: 26 September 1903; Prague, Austria-Hungary
- Died: 19 June 1952 (aged 48); Prague, Czechoslovakia

Sport
- Sport: Water polo

František Kůrka (26 September 1903 – 19 June 1952) was a Czech water polo player. He competed in the men's tournament at the 1924 Summer Olympics.
