= James Beckett (water polo) =

Irish water polo player

Personal information
- Nationality: Irish
- Born: 20 October 1884
- Died: 19 March 1971 (aged 86) Dublin, Ireland

Sport
- Sport: Water polo

James Beckett (20 October 1884 – 19 March 1971) was an Irish water polo player. He competed in the men's tournament at the 1924 Summer Olympics. He was the uncle of Samuel Beckett.
