= Joseph De Combe =

Belgian water polo player

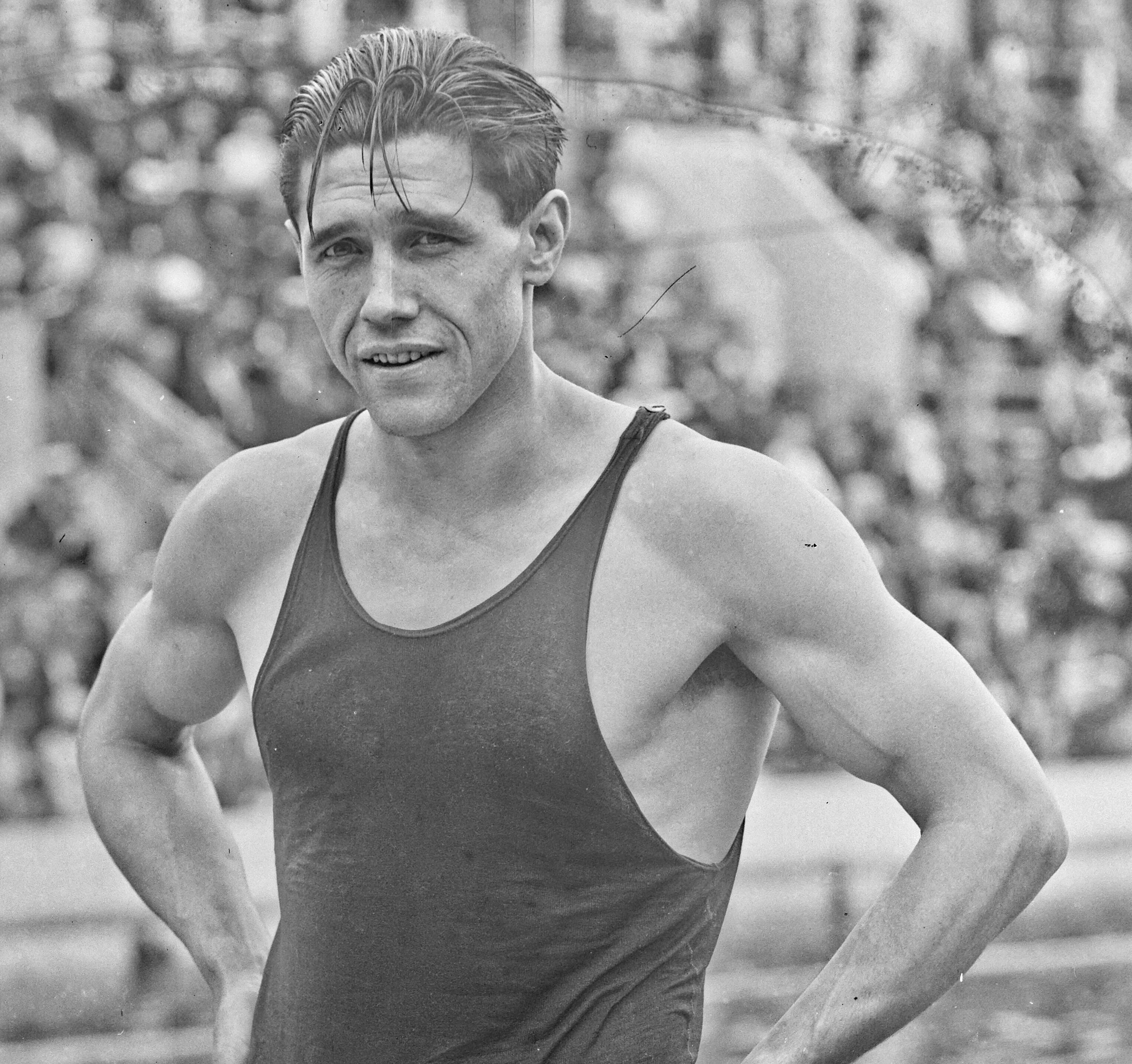
- Photo of Joseph De Combe

Personal information
- Born: 19 June 1901 Antwerp, Belgium
- Died: 28 December 1965 (aged 64) Antwerp, Belgium

Sport
- Sport: Swimming
Medal record
Representing Belgium
Olympic Games
Men's Swimming
Silver medal – second place	1924 Paris	200 m breaststroke
Men's Water polo
Silver medal – second place	1924 Paris	Team competition
Bronze medal – third place	1936 Berlin	Team competition

Joseph De Combe (19 June 1901 – 28 December 1965) was a Belgian swimmer and water polo player who competed in the 1924, 1928 and 1936 Summer Olympics.

In the 1924 Olympics he won a silver medal in the 200 m breaststroke event. He also was a member of the Belgian water polo team, which won a silver medal. He played one match. Four years later he did not finish in his first round heat of the 200 m breaststroke event and did not advance. In the 1936 Olympics he was a member of Belgian water polo team, which won a bronze medal. He played all seven matches.

== See also ==
- List of Olympic medalists in swimming (men)
- List of Olympic medalists in water polo (men)
