= Mario Balla =

Italian water polo player (1903–1964)

Personal information
- Born: 21 February 1903; Genoa, Italy
- Died: 28 March 1964 (aged 61); Genoa, Italy

Sport
- Sport: Water polo

Mario Balla (21 February 1903 – 28 March 1964) was an Italian water polo player. He competed in the men's tournament at the 1924 Summer Olympics.

== See also ==
- Italy men's Olympic water polo team records and statistics
- List of men's Olympic water polo tournament goalkeepers
