= Pat Convery (water polo) =

Irish water polo player

Personal information
- Nationality: Irish
- Born: 1896
- Died: 17 May 1968 (aged 71–72)

Sport
- Sport: Water polo

Pat Convery (1896 – 17 May 1968) was an Irish water polo player. He competed in the men's tournament at the 1924 Summer Olympics.
