= Albert De Roocker =

Belgian fencer

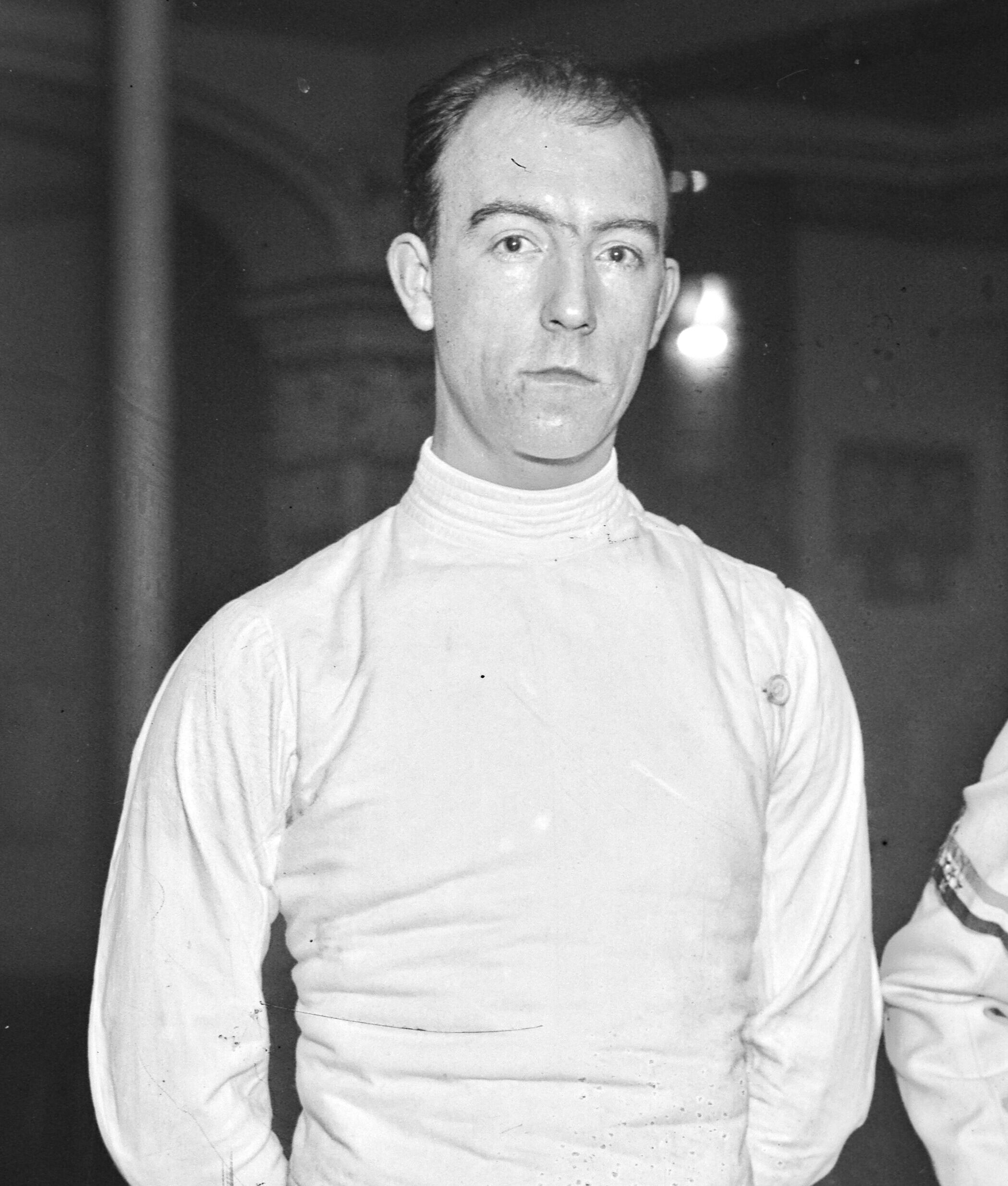
- Albert De Roocker in 1933

Personal information
- Born: 25 January 1904
- Died: 8 March 1989 (aged 85)

Sport
- Sport: Fencing
Medal record
Men's fencing
Representing Belgium
Olympic Games
Silver medal – second place	1924 Paris	Foil, team

Albert De Roocker (25 January 1904 – 8 March 1989) was a Belgian fencer. He won a silver medal in the team foil competition at the 1924 Summer Olympics.
