= Arthur Austin (water polo) =

American water polo player (1902–1962)

Arthur Austin Jr.
Personal information
- Nickname: Ginger
- National team: USA
- Born: July 8, 1902 Oakland, California, United States
- Died: February 4, 1962 (aged 59) Pasadena, California, United States
- Occupations: Import Broker; Sales Manager
- Spouse: Winifred Hill (1928)
- Children: 2 daughters

Sport
- Sport: Water polo swimming
- College team: Stanford University
- Club: Hollywood A.C. San Francisco Olympic Club; Los Angeles A.C.
- Coached by: Carl Dietz (Freemont High School); Ernst Brandsten (Stanford)
Medal record
Representing United States
Olympic Games
Bronze medal – third place	1924 Paris	Team competition

Arthur Austin Jr. (July 8, 1902 – February 4, 1962) was an American swimmer and water polo player who won a bronze medal in water polo at the 1924 Summer Olympics in Paris and competed in water polo and swimming with Stanford University from around 1919-1923. After marrying in 1928, he worked as a water polo official and referee from 1932-1947, for the Illinois Pacific Coast Company as an import broker, as a sales manager for Anchor Hocking Glass. He remained active in the water polo and sports community, serving for a time as a chair for both the National AAU Water Polo Committee, and the U.S. Olympic Games Committee.

Austin was born July 8, 1902 in Oakland, California to Arthur Austin Senior. He had an older brother Harry, and a sister. Growing up in Oakland, he began swimming with the Oakland YMCA, but later competed for Freemont High School under swim coach Carl Dietz and Freemont High general Coach Walter Le Baker. On April 20, 1918, representing Freemont High, he competed in the Alameda County High School League Swimming meet. During his High School years, he was considered by many to be one of the fastest swimmers for his size among the competitors in the Pacific Coast Schools.

== Stanford University ==
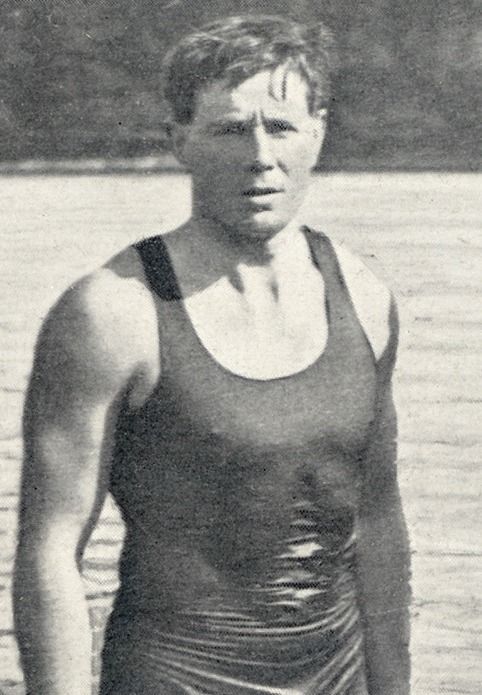
Stanford Coach Ernst Brandsten, 1912

Austin attended and graduated Stanford University, where he was a member of Delta Tau Fraternity, and competed with Stanford's Varsity swimming and water polo teams from 1920-1923. At Stanford, Austin was coached in swimming and water polo by Hall of Fame Coach, and 1912 Olympic diver for Sweden, Ernst Brandsten. Wally O'Connor was an outstanding member of Stanford's Water Polo and swim team at the time, and attended the 1924 Olympics with Austin where he both competed in swimming and shared the bronze medal with Austin in water polo. O'Connor, a Stanford water polo Captain, may have also helped coach the Stanford team occasionally. Film Star Johnny Weismuller also competed with the U.S. Water Polo team in 1924, and shared in the bronze medal, but did not attend Stanford.

A recognized regional power in the sport, Stanford's Water Polo Team, during Austin's tenure, was a Collegiate Pac-8 Conference Champion in 1921, 1922, and 1923. Recognized as a strong swimmer, in his Freshman year at Stanford in April, 1920 he was elected team Captain. As a Sophomore at Stanford on October 22, 1920, Austin won both the 50-yard freestyle with a time of :28 and the 100-yard freestyle event in 1:06.8 at the interclass meet held at Stanford, becoming the star of the meet, and leading his sophomore class to win against the other Stanford swimmers.

During his collegiate years, he was a member of both the National indoor Championship Team of the American Athletic Union in 1920, and the National outdoor Championship Team of the American Athletic Union in 1921.

== 1924 Olympic try-outs ==
Serving as a 1924 Olympic try-out, Austin was chosen for the U.S. Olympic team after playing water polo for the San Francisco Olympic Club around late March-April, 1924, at the National Water Polo Championships in Chicago, Illinois, though the Stanford team had also played against the Olympic Club prior to the National Water Polo Championships, which may have also influenced the selection committee. The U.S. Olympic committee selections included Austin, and his San Francisco Olympic club team mates George Mitchell, and George Schroth. Charles Elmer Collett, who played water polo for both the San Francisco Olympic Club, and Stanford was another San Francisco area resident chosen to be a U.S. water polo team member. Though funds were lacking initially for their trip to Paris, by June 10 the San Francisco selections were told to report to New York where they would gather with other U.S. Water Polo team members before sailing for Paris.

== 1924 Paris Olympics ==
In mid-July 1924, Austin was part of the U.S. water polo team which won the bronze medal. Austin, an important addition to the team, played all five matches. In an unexpected turn of events, including to the French audience, France defeated Belgium, 3-0, to capture the gold medal. Belgium, after defeating Sweden by a score of 4-3, then faced the United States for the silver-medal. Belgium beat the US by a score of 2-1. The American team filed a protest, but the Belgium team still captured the silver medal in the replay by the same score, 2-1.

At the October, 1924 Pacific Association Swimming Championships, Austin, representing San Francisco's Olympic Club, placed second in the 50-yard freestyle behind fellow Olympic Club member Jack Robertson, helping lead the Olympic Club to the team title for the meet.

=== Club participation ===
After leaving Stanford, he swam and played water polo for the Hollywood Athletic Club, the San Francisco Olympic Club, and later the Los Angeles Athletic Club. At the Los Angeles Athletic Club, he may have received coaching from Clyde Swenson who coached the L.A. Athletic Club in diving, swimming, and water polo, during the years Austin was active with their teams. He competed in the 400-yard relay and Water Polo with the Olympic Club with fellow Olympian George Schroth in April, 1924. From 1932-1948, Schroth officially coached water polo at the San Francisco Olympic club, and may have served as an informal coach in 1924.

== Life outside athletics ==
=== Marriage ===
On the evening of Saturday, September 1, 1928 at the home of the bride's mother, Austin was married to Winifred Hill by Father Gee, Pastor of Claremont California's St. Peter's Episcopal Church. The couple initially planned to live in Modesto, California, eighty miles East and inland of San Francisco.

In professional pursuits, Austin worked for the Illinois Pacific Coast Company as an import broker. He had worked as a manager in sales for the company Anchor Hocking Glass. Remaining active in Water Polo, he had a long history as a water polo referee, serving from 1932-47.

Austin died at his home in Pasadena, California on February 4, 1962, after a long illness. Highly active in the water polo community, Austin had served as Chair of both the National AAU Water Polo Committee, and the U.S. Olympic Games Committee. He had also formerly served as a Chair and Vice-President of the AAU's Southern Pacific Association. In San Francisco, where he lived much of his life after swimming, he was a member of the city's Bohemian Club, a theatrical group that included a few of his former friends from the San Francisco Olympic club. Austin was survived by his widow of thirty-five years, Winifred, as well as two daughters, his brother Harry, a sister and two grandchildren. Services were held at Pasadena's St. Philips Church and he was buried at Resurrection Cemetery.

=== Honors ===
In 1979, he was inducted into the USA Water Polo Hall of Fame.

== See also ==
- List of Olympic medalists in water polo (men)
