= Christos Vrettos =

Greek shot putter

Personal information
- Nationality: Greek
- Born: 25 March 1894
- Died: October 1973

Sport
- Sport: Athletics
- Event: Shot put

Christos Vrettos (25 March 1894 – October 1973) was a Greek athlete. He competed in the men's shot put at the 1924 Summer Olympics.
