= Gérard Blitz (entrepreneur) =

Belgian entrepreneur

- Blitz, 1985
- Born: 28 February 1912; Antwerp, Belgium
- Died: 3 March 1990 (aged 78); Paris, France
- Occupation: Entrepreneur
- Known for: Founder of Club Med

Gérard Blitz (28 February 1912 – 3 March 1990) was a Belgian entrepreneur and Yogi.

Born in Antwerp, he was the son of Maurice Blitz and nephew of Gérard Blitz, both members of the Belgian water polo national team who won Olympic medals. Taking a Bronze in Water Polo, his Uncle Gerard, was one of only around eight Jewish athletes to win a medal in the 1936 Berlin Summer Games hosted by Nazi Germany.

He was apolitical during the 1930s, but joined the French Resistance in World War II and showing a rebellious streak and strong anti-Fascist sentiments was briefly a member of the Communist Party, ending the association when he felt the organization's structure became more important than the individual. After the war, he founded Club Med.

Majorca Island off Southeastern Spain, see inset

On 27 April 1950, Gérard Blitz officially founded the Club Méditerranée association, having submitted its statute to the Paris Police Prefecture earlier in February. In the same year, he created Club Med as a non-profit, bringing the first group of vacationers to Alcudia on the Northern Coast of Majorca in the Baleric Islands South of Spain.

Ironically, Blitz's first idea for what would become a luxurious resort for vacationers may have come in 1945, when he opened a village to rehabilitate Belgian survivors of Nazi concentration camps.

Following in his father's footsteps, the Belgian-born Mr. Blitz initially found work as a diamond cutter.

In the beginning, vacationers led a somewhat Spartan lifestyle in tents, but the concept evolved as resort members later occupied straw huts, eventually enjoying a degree of luxury in modern hotels. Club Med found success with prepaid vacations that eliminated tipping, using beads for souvenirs or bar drinks, which relaxed guests by eliminating the need to carry much cash. Other resorts copied the concept.

Featuring relaxing adventures in the sand and sun, the resort became one of the world's largest tourism groups, with a collection of hotels and ski lodges that featured over 87,000 beds. A great deal of credit for the resorts's success belongs to Gilbert Trigano who took over as president in 1963, and supplied the tents for the company in its early years. Blitz remained Honorary President throughout his life.

Blitz was married twice and had four children.

Gérard Blitz was also a promoter of Hatha yoga, which he discovered through Éva Ruchpaul. He was secretary and then president of the European Union of Yoga from 1974 to his death in 1990 at the Cochin Hospital in Paris.

== Bibliography ==
- Gérard Blitz, Bruno Solt : La Vacance, Dervy, Paris, 1990, ISBN 2-85076-329-2, ISBN 978-2-85076-329-8.

== See also ==
- Jews in Sports
