= Georges Fleurix =

Belgian water polo player

Personal information
- Born: August 31, 1892 Brussels, Belgium

Sport
- Sport: Water polo
Medal record
Representing Belgium
Olympic Games
Silver medal – second place	1924 Paris	Team competition

Georges Fleurix (born 31 August 1892, date of death unknown) was a Belgian water polo player who competed in the 1924 Summer Olympics. In 1924 he won the silver medal with the Belgian water polo team. He played five matches and scored one goal.

== See also ==
- List of Olympic medalists in water polo (men)
