= Mario Cazzaniga =

Italian water polo player

Personal information
- Nationality: Italian
- Born: 1900 Milan, Italy

Sport
- Sport: Water polo

Mario Cazzaniga (born 1900, date of death unknown) was an Italian water polo player. He competed in the men's tournament at the 1924 Summer Olympics.
