= Rómulo Berruti =

Argentine journalist (1937–2026)

- Born: October 23, 1937; Buenos Aires, Argentina
- Died: March 22, 2026 (aged 88); Buenos Aires, Argentina
- Occupation: Journalist
- Relatives: Alejandro Berruti (uncle)

Rómulo Berruti (October 23, 1937 – March 22, 2026) was an Argentine journalist. He wrote for Clarín for 26 years, and received the Konex Award in 1987. Berruti died in Buenos Aires on March 22, 2026, at the age of 88.
