= Jean-Pierre Willems =

Belgian fencer

Personal information
- Born: 30 October 1886
- Died: Unknown

Sport
- Sport: Fencing

Jean-Pierre Willems (born 30 October 1886, date of death unknown) was a Belgian fencer. He competed in the team sabre competition at the 1924 Summer Olympics.
