= Lajos Homonnai =

Hungarian water polo player

Personal information
- Born: May 2, 1904; Budapest, Austria-Hungary

Sport
- Sport: Water polo

Lajos Homonnai (born 2 May 1904, date of death unknown) was a Hungarian water polo player who competed at the 1924 Summer Olympics. Born in Budapest, he was part of the Hungarian team in the 1924 tournament, in which he played three matches.
