= Buydens =

Buydens is a surname. Notable people with the surname include:

- Albert Buydens (1905–?), Belgian swimmer, competitor at the 1924 Summer Olympics
- Anne Buydens (1919–2021), German-born Belgian-American philanthropist, producer, and actress
- Hubert Buydens (born 1982), Canadian rugby union player
