= Joseph Cludts =

Belgian swimmer

Personal information
- Born: 1896 Brussels, Belgium

Sport
- Sport: Swimming
Medal record
Representing Belgium
Men's Water Polo
Olympic Games
Silver medal – second place	1924 Paris	Team competition

Joseph Cludts (born 1896, date of death unknown) was a Belgian freestyle swimmer and water polo player who competed in the 1920 Summer Olympics and in the 1924 Summer Olympics.

In 1920 he was a member of the Belgian freestyle relay team, which was eliminated in the first round of the 4 x 200 metre freestyle relay event. Four years later, he won the silver medal with the Belgian water polo team. He played five matches and scored two goals.

== See also ==
- List of Olympic medalists in water polo (men)
