= Georgios Khalkiopoulos =

Greek water polo player

Personal information
- Nationality: Greek
- Born: 1901

Sport
- Sport: Water polo

Georgios Khalkiopoulos (born 1901, date of death unknown) was a Greek water polo player. He competed in the men's tournament at the 1924 Summer Olympics.
