= George Schroth =

American water polo player (1899–1989)

Personal information
- Full name: George Edward Schroth
- National team: USA
- Born: December 31, 1899 Sacramento, California, United States
- Died: January 26, 1989 (aged 89) Los Molinos, California, United States
- Occupations: Coach, Swimming, Water Polo; *SF Olympic Club; *UC Berkeley
- Height: 194 cm (6 ft 4 in)
- Spouses: Frances Cowells Schroth; Mary "Kay" Schroth

Sport
- Sport: Swimming; Water polo
- College team: St. Mary's College; Moraga, California
- Club: San Francisco Olympic Club
Medal record
Representing United States
Olympic Games
Bronze medal – third place	1924 Paris	Team competition

George Edward Schroth (December 31, 1899 – January 26, 1989) was an American swimmer and water polo player who won a bronze medal in Water Polo in the 1924 Summer Olympics in Paris and placed fifth in Water Polo at the 1928 Summer Olympics in Amsterdam.

Schroth was born December 31, 1899 in Sacramento, California. He attended Sacramento High School, California's second oldest public High School, and played Water Polo from 1918-1921 during his High School years. He later attended St. Mary's College, in Moraga, California, where he competed from 1922-1925.

== 1924 Olympic try-outs ==
Serving as a 1924 Olympic try-out, Schroth was chosen for the U.S. Olympic team after playing water polo for the San Francisco Olympic Club around late March-April, 1924, at the National Water Polo Championships in Chicago, Illinois. The U.S. Olympic committee selections from San Francisco included San Francisco Olympic Club teammates Arthur Austin, and George Mitchell. Charles Elmer Collett, who played water polo for both the San Francisco Olympic Club, and Stanford was another San Francisco area resident chosen to be a U.S. water polo team member. Though funds were lacking initially for their trip to Paris, by June 10 the San Francisco selections were told to report to New York where they would gather with other U.S. Water Polo team members before sailing for Paris.

== Olympics ==
At the 1924 Paris Olympics, Schroth won the bronze medal with the American water polo team. He played all five matches and scored one goal. Four years later he was a member of the American team which tied for fifth in the 1928 Olympic water polo tournament in Amsterdam. He played both matches.

Schroth competed in swimming and water polo for the San Francisco Olympic Club from 1926-1932.

=== Coaching ===
Widely recognized as an accomplished swimming and Water Polo Coach during his lifetime, he coached the San Francisco Olympic Club as an Assistant Coach from 1932-1936, and as a head Coach from 1936-1948. From 1948-1961, he served as Head Swimming and Water Polo coach for the University of California Berkeley.

=== Marriages ===
His first wife, Frances Cowells Schroth, was on the U.S. Women's Olympic Swimming team in both the 1920 and 1924 Olympics. He later married Mary "Kay" Schroth, who preceded him in death.

He died at 89 on January 26, 1989 at Red Bluff Convalescent Home, in Red Bluff, California, 10 miles North of Los Molinos where he had been living.

=== Honors ===
In 1976, recognized for service as an accomplished athlete, coach, and administrator for swimming and water polo, he was inducted into the USA Water Polo Hall of Fame.

== See also ==
- List of Olympic medalists in water polo (men)
