= Tito Ambrosini =

Italian water polo player

Personal information
- Full name: Tito Camillo Giovanni Battista Santo Ambrosini
- Nationality: Italian
- Born: 24 June 1903 Genoa, Italy
- Died: 14 April 1965 (aged 61) Genoa, Italy

Sport
- Sport: Water polo

Tito Ambrosini (24 June 1903 – 14 April 1965) was an Italian water polo player. He competed in the men's tournament at the 1924 Summer Olympics.
