= Jean-Pierre Vermetten =

Belgian swimmer

Personal information
- Born: 6 February 1895 Antwerp, Belgium
- Died: December 1977 (aged 82)

Sport
- Sport: Swimming
Medal record
Representing Belgium
Olympic Games
Men's Water Polo
Silver medal – second place	1924 Paris	Team competition

Jean-Pierre Vermetten (6 February 1895 – December 1977) was a Belgian freestyle swimmer and water polo player who competed in the 1920 Summer Olympics and in the 1924 Summer Olympics.

In 1920 he was a member of the Belgian freestyle relay team, which was eliminated in the first round of the 4 x 200 metre freestyle relay event. Four years later, he won the silver medal with the Belgian water polo team. He played four matches and scored one goal.

== See also ==
- List of Olympic medalists in water polo (men)
