= Achille Gavoglio =

Italian water polo player (born 1892)

Personal information
- Nationality: Italian
- Born: 1892 Genoa, Italy
- Died: Unknown

Sport
- Sport: Water polo

Achille Gavoglio (born 1892, date of death unknown) was an Italian water polo player. He competed in the men's tournament at the 1924 Summer Olympics.
