= Charles Acke =

Belgian fencer

Robert Acke
Personal information
- Full name: Robert Alphonse Acke
- Born: 21 March 1890 Kortrijk, Belgium
- Died: August 1976 (aged 86) Sint-Andries, Belgium

Sport
- Sport: Fencing

Robert Acke (21 March 1890 – August 1976) was a Belgian fencer. He competed in the individual sabre competition at the 1924 Summer Olympics.
