= Maurice Blitz =

Belgian water polo player (1891–1975)

Personal information
- Born: 28 July 1891 Paris, France
- Died: 2 February 1975 (aged 83)

Sport
- Sport: Water polo
Medal record
Representing Belgium
Olympic Games
Silver medal – second place	1920 Antwerp	Team competition
Silver medal – second place	1924 Paris	Team competition

Maurice Blitz (28 July 1891 – 2 February 1975) was a Belgian Olympic water polo player during the 1920s. He was born in Île-de-France, Paris. He was the older brother of sporting champion Gérard Blitz, and father of Gérard Blitz who founded Club Med in 1950.

Maurice Blitz and his brother Gérard were both member of the Belgian water polo national team who won silver in two consecutive olympic events, in 1920 and 1924.

Maurice Blitz, who was Jewish, did not leave the water polo scene once he retired from competitions. He became an international referee (he conducted the Olympic final in 1928), and was a member of the Belgian Olympic Committee and swimming federation. He was a referee for water polo in the 1928 Olympics.

In 1948, he founded the swimming and waterpolo club Zwemclub Scaldis in Antwerp.

He was one of the early financial supporters of Club Med, founded by his son Gérard in 1950.

== See also ==
- List of Olympic medalists in water polo (men)
- List of select Jewish water polo players
