= Joseph Pletincx =

Belgian water polo player

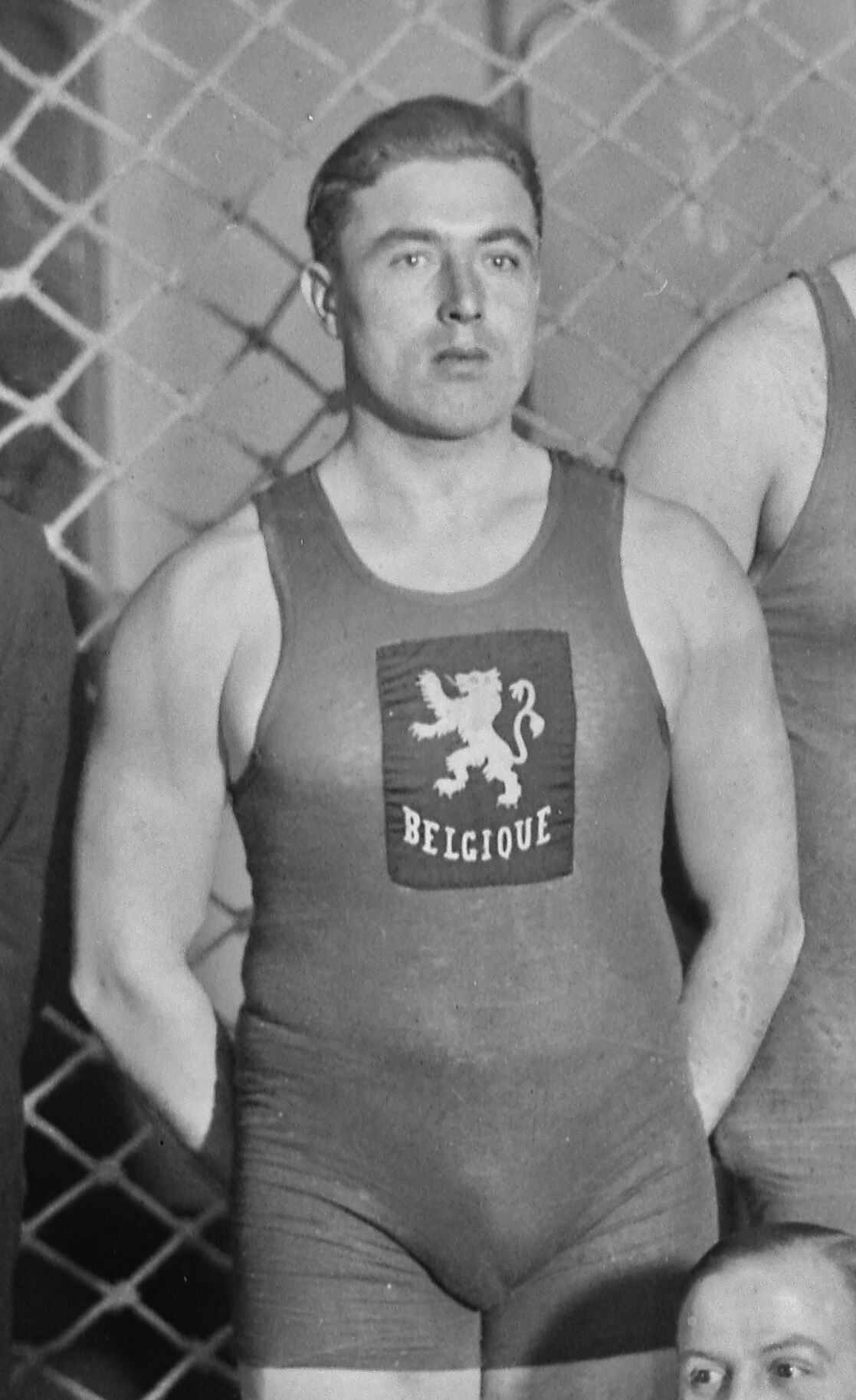
- Joseph Pletincx in 1922

Personal information
- Born: 13 June 1888 Saint-Gilles
- Died: 4 January 1971 (aged 82)

Sport
- Sport: Water polo
Medal record
Representing Belgium
Olympic Games
Silver medal – second place	1908 London	Team competition
Silver medal – second place	1920 Antwerp	Team competition
Silver medal – second place	1924 Paris	Team competition
Bronze medal – third place	1912 Stockholm	Team competition

Joseph Pletincx (13 June 1888 – 4 January 1971) was a Belgian water polo player. He competed at the 1908, 1912, 1920, and 1924 Summer Olympics and won three silver and one bronze medals, becoming one of eight male athletes who won four or more Olympic medals in water polo.

== See also ==
- Belgium men's Olympic water polo team records and statistics
- List of multiple Olympic medalists in one event
- List of Olympic medalists in water polo (men)
- List of players who have appeared in multiple men's Olympic water polo tournaments
- List of members of the International Swimming Hall of Fame
