= George Mitchell (water polo) =

American water polo player (1901–1988)

- Mitchell as a young athlete

Personal information
- Full name: George Frederick Mitchell
- National team: USA
- Born: April 23, 1901 San Francisco, California, United States
- Died: November 3, 1988 (aged 87) Alameda, California, United States

Sport
- Sport: Swimming; Water polo
- College team: University of California Berkeley
- Club: Olympic Club, San Francisco; Neptune Club of America
Medal record
Representing United States
Olympic Games
Bronze medal – third place	1924 Paris	Team competition

George Frederick Mitchell (April 23, 1901 – November 3, 1988) was an American swimmer and water polo player who competed for the University of California at Berkeley and was a member of the U.S. Water Polo team at the 1924 Summer Olympics in Paris and the 1928 Summer Olympics in Amsterdam. In 1924 he won the bronze medal with the American water polo team, playing all five matches. Four years later he was a member of the American Water Polo team which finished fifth in the 1928 Olympic water polo tournament. He played both matches.

== Early life ==
Mitchel was born April 23, 1901 in San Francisco, and attended Lick-Wilmerding High School, a private college prep school, where he played water polo from 1915-1918. An able swimmer, at 20 he won the Pacific Association Pentathlon swimming championship held at Neptune Beach on July 4, 1921. A multi-stroke athlete, Mitchell won the 50-yard freestyle in 34.2 and the 220-yard freestyle in 2:53. In stroke competition, he won the 50-yard backstroke in :27.2, and finished second in 100 breaststroke and the diving competition.

== UC Berkeley Golden Bears ==
In college, he attended the University of California Berkeley where he was a member of the Water Polo team from 1921-1923 and served as Captain in 1923. He graduated Berkeley in 1924, after completing a degree in mechanical engineering.

== 1924 Olympic try-outs ==
Serving as a 1924 Olympic try-out, Mitchell was selected for the U.S. Olympic team after playing water polo for the San Francisco Olympic Club around late March-April, 1924, at the National Water Polo Championships in Chicago, Illinois. The U.S. Olympic committee selections included Mitchell, and his San Francisco Olympic club team mates Arthur Austin, and George Schroth. Charles Elmer Collett, who played water polo for both the San Francisco Olympic Club, and Stanford was another San Francisco area resident chosen to be a U.S. water polo team member. Though funds were lacking initially for their trip to Paris, by June 10 the San Francisco selections were told to report to New York where they would gather with other U.S. Water Polo team members before sailing for Paris.

== 1924 Paris Olympics ==
In mid-July 1924, Mitchell was part of the U.S. water polo team which won the bronze medal. Mitchell, an important addition to the team, played all five matches. In an unexpected turn of events, including to the French audience, France defeated Belgium, 3-0, to capture the gold medal. Belgium, after defeating Sweden by a score of 4-3, then faced the United States for the silver-medal. Belgium beat the US by a score of 2-1. The American team filed a protest, but the Belgium team still captured the silver medal in the replay by the same score, 2-1.

As a club player, Mitchell swam and played Water Polo for the San Francisco Olympic Club from 1921-1928, which partially overlapped his time playing for U. Cal Berkeley. During his career, his teams were Northern California AAU Champions in 1921, 23, 24, 26, 27, and 28, and were Far West AAU Champions 1928.

=== Honors ===
In 1980, he was inducted into the USA Water Polo Hall of Fame.

He died in Alameda, California on November 3, 1988.

== See also ==
- List of Olympic medalists in water polo (men)
