= Nikolaos Kaloudis (water polo) =

Greek water polo player

Personal information
- Nationality: Greek
- Born: 1899

Sport
- Sport: Water polo

Nikolaos Kaloudis (Greek: Νικόλαος Καλούδης, born 1899, date of death unknown) was a Greek water polo player. He competed in the men's tournament at the 1924 Summer Olympics.
