= Alejandro Berruti =

Argentine playwright (1888–1964)

Alejandro Eugenio Berruti
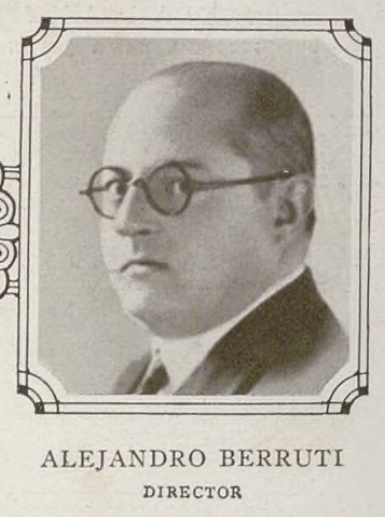
- Berruti in 1930
- Born: July 6, 1888; Córdoba, Argentina
- Died: August 31, 1964 (aged 76); Buenos Aires, Argentina
- Occupation: Playwright
- Relatives: Rómulo Berruti (nephew)

Alejandro Berruti (July 6, 1888 – August 31, 1964) was an Argentine playwright.
