= Eugenio Della Casa =

Italian water polo player (1901–1985)

Eugenio Dellacasa
Personal information
- Full name: Eugenio Emanuele Dellacasa
- Nationality: Italian
- Born: 21 April 1901; Genoa, Kingdom of Italy
- Died: 25 August 1985 (aged 84); Genoa, Italy

Sport
- Sport: Water polo

Eugenio Dellacasa (21 April 1901 – 25 August 1985) was an Italian water polo player. He competed in the men's tournament at the 1924 Summer Olympics.
