= Pierre Dewin =

Belgian water polo player

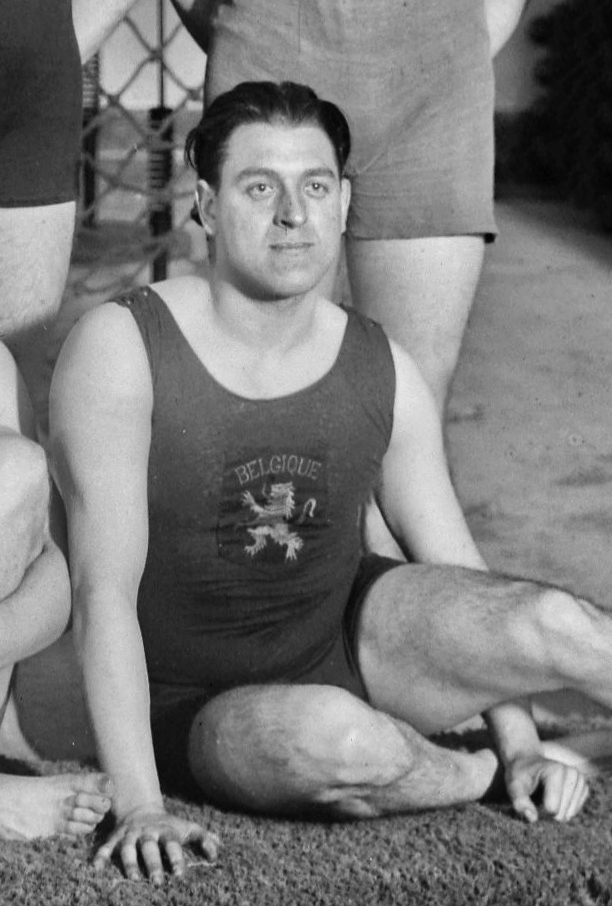
- Pierre Dewin in 1922

Personal information
- Born: 6 September 1894
- Died: Unknown

Sport
- Sport: Water polo
Medal record
Representing Belgium
Olympic Games
Silver medal – second place	1920 Antwerp	Team competition
Silver medal – second place	1924 Paris	Team competition

Pierre Dewin (born 6 September 1894, date of death unknown) was a Belgian water polo player who won silver medals at the 1920 and 1924 Summer Olympics.

== See also ==
- List of Olympic medalists in water polo (men)
