= Albert Durant =

Belgian water polo player (1892–1958)

Personal information
- Full name: Albert Paul Durant
- Born: 1 July 1892
- Died: June 1958 (aged 65)
Medal record
Men's Water Polo
Olympic Games
| Silver medal – second place | 1920 Antwerp | Team competition |
| Silver medal – second place | 1924 Paris | Team competition |
| Bronze medal – third place | 1912 Stockholm | Team competition |

Albert Paul Durant (1 July 1892 – June 1958) was a Belgian water polo player who competed in the 1912 Summer Olympics, 1920 Summer Olympics, and in the 1924 Summer Olympics. He was part of the Belgian team, which was able to win three consecutive medals.

== See also ==
- Belgium men's Olympic water polo team records and statistics
- List of Olympic medalists in water polo (men)
- List of men's Olympic water polo tournament goalkeepers
