= Paul Gailly =

Belgian water polo player

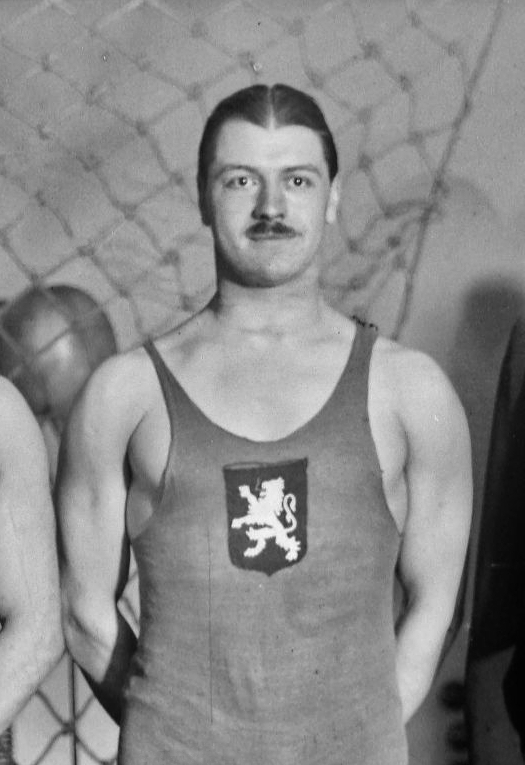
- Gailly in 1922

Personal information
- Born: 2 August 1894 Brussels, Belgium
- Died: 5 May 1969 (aged 74) Saint-Josse-ten-Noode, Belgium

Sport
- Sport: Water polo
Medal record
Representing Belgium
Olympic Games
Silver medal – second place	1920 Antwerp	Team competition
Silver medal – second place	1924 Paris	Team competition

Paul Gailly (French pronunciation: [pɔl ɡaji]; 2 August 1894 – 5 May 1969) was a Belgian water polo player who won silver medals at the 1920 and 1924 Summer Olympics.

== See also ==
- List of Olympic medalists in water polo (men)
