= Ladislav Ankert =

Czech water polo player (1902–1940)

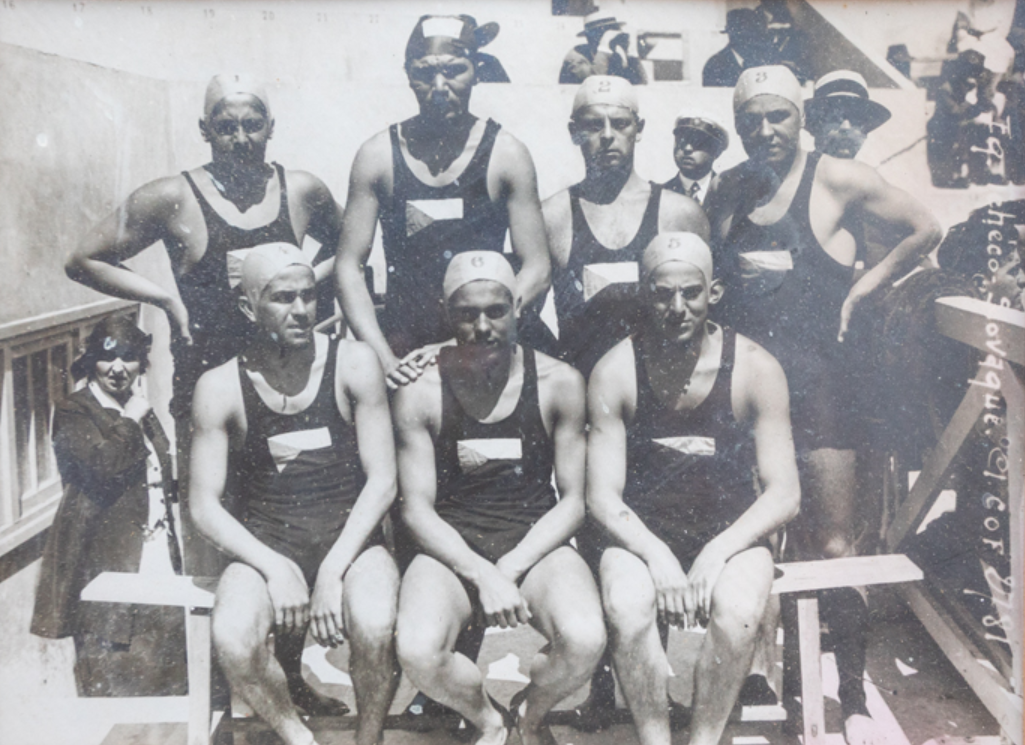
- Czechoslovak Olympic water polo team in 1924

Personal information
- Native name: Vladimír Ankrt
- Nationality: Czech
- Born: 30 November 1902 Prague, Austria-Hungary
- Died: 1940 (aged 37–38) Brazil

Sport
- Sport: Water polo

Ladislav Ankert (also called Vladimír Ankert; 7 February 1902 – 1940) was a Czech water polo player. He competed in the men's tournament at the 1924 Summer Olympics.
