= Jules Thiry =

Belgian water polo player (1898–1931)

Personal information
- Born: 21 June 1898 Wellin, Belgium
- Died: 7 February 1931 (aged 32) Brussels, Belgium

Sport
- Sport: Water polo
Medal record
Representing Belgium
Olympic Games
Silver medal – second place	1924 Paris	Team competition

Jules Thiry (21 June 1898 – 7 February 1931) was a Belgian water polo player who competed in the 1924 Summer Olympics. In 1924 he won the silver medal with the Belgian water polo team. He played two matches.

== See also ==
- List of Olympic medalists in water polo (men)
