= Pantelis Psychas =

Greek water polo player

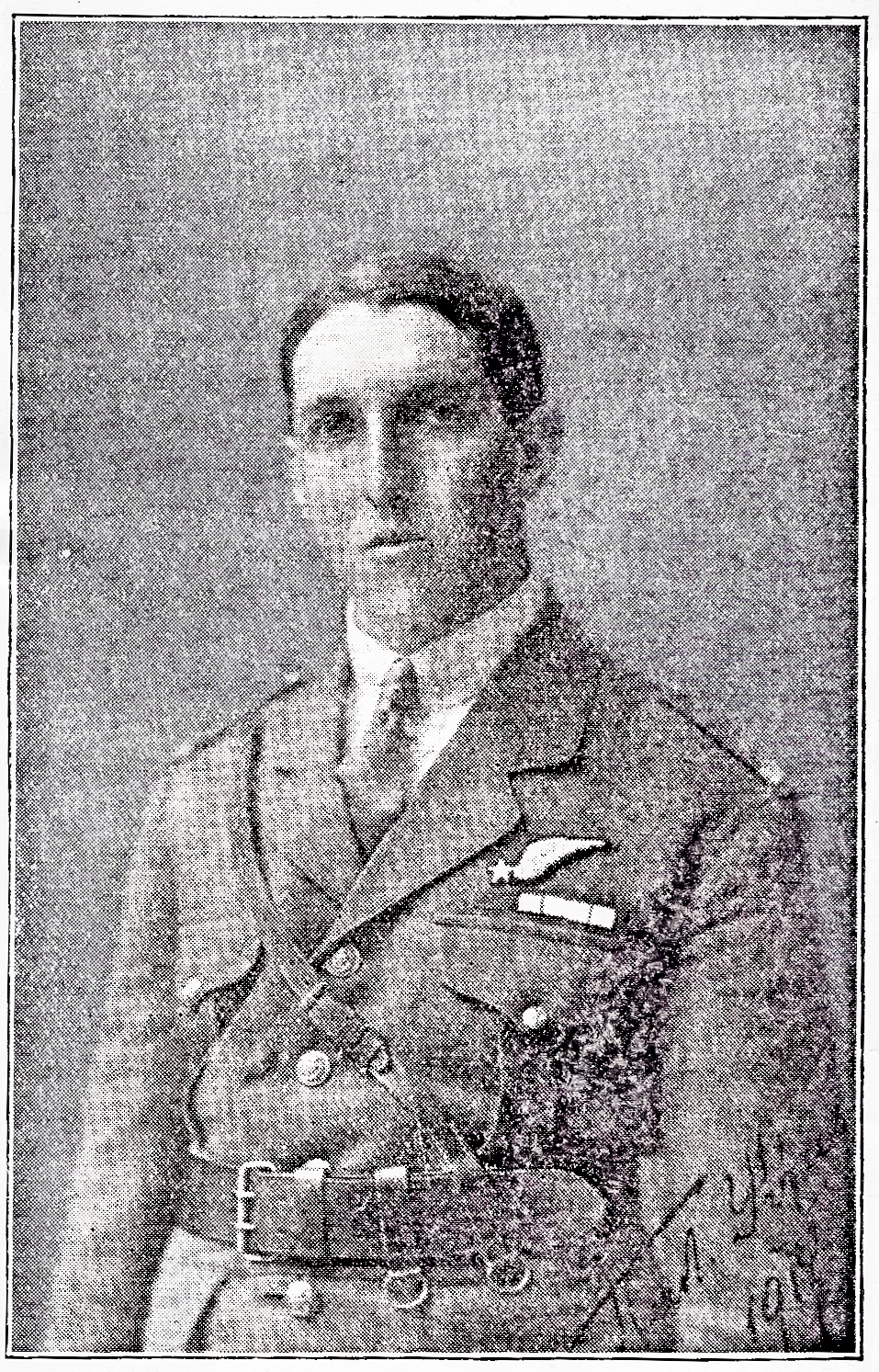
- Psychas during World War I

Personal information
- Nationality: Greek
- Born: 1887
- Died: Unknown

Sport
- Sport: Water polo

Pantelis Psychas (Greek: Παντελής Ψύχας; born 1887, date of death unknown) was a Greek navy officer and aviator, as well as a water polo player. He competed at the 1920 Summer Olympics and the 1924 Summer Olympics.
