= Gérard Blitz (swimmer) =

Belgian swimmer (1901–1979)

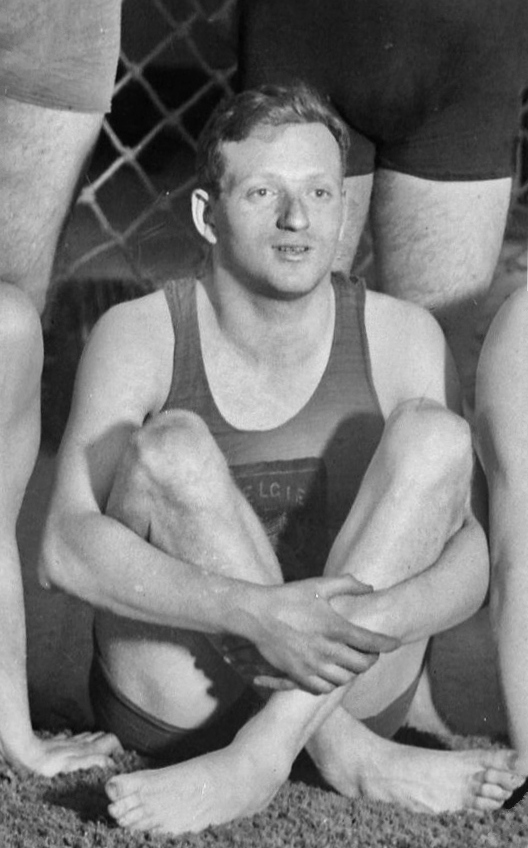
- Gérard Blitz in 1922

Personal information
- Born: 1 August 1901 Amsterdam, the Netherlands
- Died: 8 March 1979 (aged 77) Ganshoren, Belgium

Sport
- Sport: Water polo, swimming
Medal record
Representing Belgium
Olympic Games
Water polo
Silver medal – second place	1920 Antwerp	Team competition
Silver medal – second place	1924 Paris	Team competition
Bronze medal – third place	1936 Berlin	Team competition
Swimming
Bronze medal – third place	1920 Antwerp	100 m backstroke

Gérard Blitz (1 August 1901 – 8 March 1979) was a Belgian Olympic swimmer and water polo player who competed at the 1920, 1924, 1928 and 1936 Olympics. He was the younger brother of Maurice Blitz, also a water polo player, and uncle of Gérard Blitz who founded Club Med in 1950.

== Biography ==
=== 1920 Olympic Bronze and Silver ===
At the 1920 Summer Olympics, Blitz won a bronze medal in the 100 m backstroke and a silver medal with the Belgian water polo team, which also included his brother Maurice. He failed to reach the finals of the 100 m and 4 × 200 m freestyle events.

On 16 September 1921, he set a world record in the 400 m backstroke at 5:59.2, which lasted until 1927, and held the ASA (English) record for the 150 meter backstroke briefly from 1920 to 1921.

=== 1924 Olympic Silver ===
At the 1924 Summer Olympics, the Blitz brothers were still part of the Belgian water polo squad, which won another silver medal. Blitz also finished fourth in the 100 m backstroke swimming event. However, he had little luck at the 1928 Games, as his water polo team finished fifth, and he was eliminated in the heats of his swimming events.

=== 1936 Olympic Bronze ===
Eight years later, at the 1936 Summer Berlin Games, he won his last Olympic medal, a bronze in water polo. He played all seven matches. Blitz was one of several Jewish athletes who won medals at the 1936 Nazi Olympics. The Nazi regime had passed the anti-Semitic Nuremberg laws the prior Fall which stripped German Jews of citizenship, opportunities to receive a public education, and access to many professions and public facilities. Jewish businesses had been boycotted, and Jews could not serve in the legal profession, the civil service, teach in secondary schools or universities or vote or hold public office.

Blitz died in 1979. In 1990 he was inducted in the International Swimming Hall of Fame as an Honor Pioneer Swimmer.

== See also ==
- Belgium men's Olympic water polo team records and statistics
- List of Olympic medalists in swimming (men)
- List of Olympic medalists in water polo (men)
- List of players who have appeared in multiple men's Olympic water polo tournaments
- List of members of the International Swimming Hall of Fame
- List of select Jewish swimmers
- List of select Jewish water polo players
- List of multi-sport athletes
