= Christos Peppas =

Greek footballer

Personal information
- Nationality: Greek
- Born: 1899; Piraeus

Sport
- Sport: Football

Christos Peppas (Greek: Χρήστος Πέππας; born 1899, date of death unknown) was a Greek football player. He was born in Piraeus. He played for the club Piraikos Podosfairikos Omilos. He was one of the founding members of Ethnikos Piraeus. He was member of the Greek team for the 1920 Olympic Games in Antwerp.
