= Dionysios Vasilopoulos =

Greek swimmer

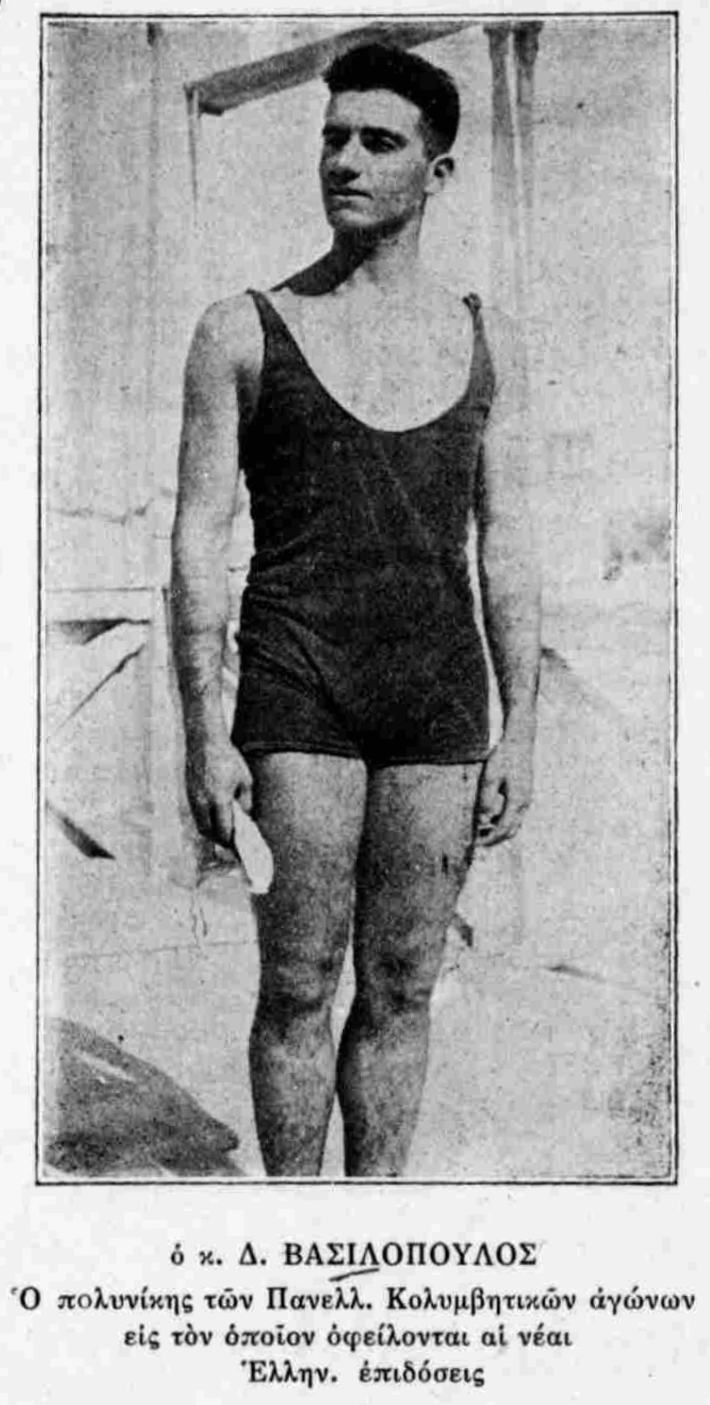

Personal information
- Born: 1902 Alexandria, Egypt
- Died: 1964 (aged 61–62)

Sport
- Sport: Swimming

Dionysios Vasilopoulos (1902–1964) was a Greek swimmer. He competed in the water polo at the 1920 Summer Olympics and the 1924 Summer Olympics and in three swimming events at the 1924 Summer Olympics. He competed for Al-Iskanderiya in Egypt and AOPF of Palaio Faliro in Greece.
