= Italy at the 1924 Summer Olympics =

- IOC code: ITA
- NOC: Italian National Olympic Committee

in Paris
- Competitors: 200 (196 men, 4 women) in 18 sports
- Flag bearer: Ugo Frigerio
- Medals Ranked 5th: Gold 8 Silver 3 Bronze 5 Total 16

Summer Olympics appearances (overview)
- 1896; 1900; 1904; 1908; 1912; 1920; 1924; 1928; 1932; 1936; 1948; 1952; 1956; 1960; 1964; 1968; 1972; 1976; 1980; 1984; 1988; 1992; 1996; 2000; 2004; 2008; 2012; 2016; 2020; 2024

Other related appearances
- 1906 Intercalated Games

Italy competed at the 1924 Summer Olympics in Paris, France. 200 competitors, 196 men and 4 women, took part in 93 events in 18 sports.

== Medalists ==
Medal	Name	Sport	Event	Date
Gold	Ugo Frigerio	Athletics	Men's 10 km walk	July 13
Gold	Angelo De Martini, Alfredo Dinale, Aurelio Menegazzi, Francesco Zucchetti	Cycling	Men's team pursuit	July 27
Gold	Renato Anselmi, Guido Balzarini, Marcello Bertinetti, Bino Bini, Vincenzo Cuccia, Oreste Moricca, Oreste Puliti, Giulio Sarrocchi	Fencing	Men's team sabre	July 15
Gold	Luigi Cambiaso, Mario Lertora, Vittorio Lucchetti, Luigi Maiocco, Ferdinando Mandrini, Francesco Martino, Giuseppe Paris, Giorgio Zampori	Gymnastics	Men's team	July 23
Gold	Francesco Martino	Gymnastics	Men's rings	July 19
Gold	Pierino Gabetti	Weightlifting	Men's 60 kg	July 21
Gold	Carlo Galimberti	Weightlifting	Men's 75 kg	July 23
Gold	Giuseppe Tonani	Weightlifting	Men's +82.5 kg	July 23
Silver	Romeo Bertini	Athletics	Men's marathon	July 13
Silver	Tommaso Lequio di Assaba	Equestrian	Individual jumping	July 27
Silver	Ercole Olgeni, Giovanni Scatturin, Gino Sopracordevole	Rowing	Men's coxed pair	July 17
Bronze	Alessandro Alvisi, Emanuele Beraudo di Pralormo, Tommaso Lequio di Assaba, Alberto Lombardi	Equestrian	Team eventing	July 26
Bronze	Giulio Basletta, Marcello Bertinetti, Giovanni Canova, Vincenzo Cuccia, Virgilio Mantegazza, Oreste Moricca	Fencing	Men's team épée	July 9
Bronze	Giorgio Zampori	Gymnastics	Men's parallel bars	July 18
Bronze	Ante Katalinić, Frane Katalinić, Šimun Katalinić, Giuseppe Crivelli, Latino Galasso, Petar Ivanov, Vittorio Gliubich, Bruno Sorić, Carlo Toniatti	Rowing	Men's eight	July 17
Bronze	Umberto De Morpurgo	Tennis	Men's singles	July 20

== Athletics ==
Thirty-six athletes represented Italy in 1924. It was the nation's fifth appearance in the sport. Frigerio successfully defended his title in the 10 kilometre walk. Bertini took Italy's only other athletics medal in 1924, finishing second in the marathon.

Ranks given are within the heat.

Athlete	Event	Heats		Quarterfinals		Semifinals		Final	
Athlete	Event	Result	Rank	Result	Rank	Result	Rank	Result	Rank
Ernesto Alciati	Marathon	N/A						did not finish	
Ernesto Ambrosini	3000 m steeplechase	N/A				Unknown	4	did not advance	
Romeo Bertini	Marathon	N/A						2:47:19.6	2nd place, silver medalist(s)
Tullio Biscuola	Marathon	N/A						3:19:05.0	22
Ettore Blasi	Marathon	N/A						did not finish	
Ernesto Bonacina	100 m	11.2	2 Q	Unknown	5	did not advance			
Mario-Giuseppe Bonini	800 m	N/A		Unknown	5	did not advance			
Luigi Bosatra	10 km walk	N/A				Unknown	4 Q	50:09.0	8
Ferruccio Bruni	800 m	N/A		Unknown	4	did not advance			
Ferruccio Bruni	1500 m	N/A				Unknown	6	did not advance	
Alberto Cavallero	Marathon	N/A						did not finish	
Carlo Clemente	Javelin throw	N/A				52.75	7	did not advance	
Adolfo Contoli	Pentathlon	N/A						Elim-3	
Adolfo Contoli	Decathlon	N/A						6406.8825	11
Angelo Davoli	1500 m	N/A				Unknown	6	did not advance	
Luigi Facelli	400 m	51.0	1 Q	50.5	4	did not advance			
Luigi Facelli	400 m hurdles	N/A		56.4	2 Q	55.6	4	did not advance	
Disma Ferrario	1500 m	N/A				4:18.5	3	did not advance	
Giovanni Frangipane	100 m	11.1	2 Q	11.0	2 Q	11.2	6	did not advance	
Ugo Frigerio	10 km walk	N/A				49:15.6	1 Q	47:49.0	1st place, gold medalist(s)
Giovanni Garaventa	1500 m	N/A				Unknown	6	did not advance	
Alfredo Gargiullo	400 m	50.4	2 Q	Unknown	5	did not advance			
Ennio Maffiolini	400 m	Unknown	4	did not advance					
Angelo Malvicini	Marathon	N/A						did not finish	
Carlo Martinenghi	Cross country	N/A						37:01.0	7
Antenore Negri	3000 m steeplechase	N/A				Unknown	7	did not advance	
Giuseppe Palmieri	High jump	N/A				1.70	7	did not advance	
Pietro Pastorino	200 m	22.1	3	did not advance					
Donato Pavesi	10 km walk	N/A				49:09.0	2 Q	49:17.0	4
Albino Pighi	Discus throw	N/A				34.985	8	did not advance	
Albino Pighi	Pentathlon	N/A						Elim-3	
Armando Poggioli	Discus throw	N/A				35.29	8	did not advance	
Puccio Pucci	800 m	N/A		Unknown	4	did not advance			
Carlo Speroni	10000 m	N/A						did not finish	
Carlo Speroni	Cross country	N/A						did not finish	
Virgilio Tommasi	Long jump	N/A				6.88	2 Q	6.89	7
Enrico Torre	100 m	11.2	2 Q	Unknown	6	did not advance			
Armando Valente	10 km walk	N/A				Unknown	4	50:07.0	7
Camillo Zemi	Discus throw	N/A				37.465	7	did not advance	
Camillo Zemi	Hammer throw	N/A				35.00	13	did not advance	
Vittorio Zucca	100 m	11.5	3	did not advance					
Ernesto Ambrosini; Ferruccio Bruni; Angelo Davoli; Giovanni Garaventa	3000 m team	N/A				31	4	did not advance	
Ernesto Bonacina; Giovanni Frangipane; Pietro Pastorino; Enrico Torre	4 × 100 m relay	N/A		42.8	2 Q	42.9	3	did not advance	
Guido Cominotto; Luigi Facelli; Alfredo Gargiullo; Ennio Maffiolini	4 × 400 m relay	N/A				3:30.0	2 Q	3:28.0	6

== Boxing ==
Sixteen boxers represented Italy at the 1924 Games. It was the nation's second appearance in the sport. Italy was one of four nations (along with France, Great Britain, and the United States) to have two boxers in each of the eight weight classes; Italy was the only one of those four to not win any boxing medals. Castellenghi and Saraudi advanced to the semifinals in their weight classes, but both were beaten there and neither contested the bronze medal match.

Boxer	Weight class	Round of 32	Round of 16	Quarterfinals	Semifinals	Final / Bronze match	
Boxer	Weight class	Opposition Score	Opposition Score	Opposition Score	Opposition Score	Opposition Score	Rank
Domenico Bernasconi	Bantamweight	Ces (FRA); L	did not advance				17
Riccardo Bertazzolo	Heavyweight	N/A	O'Kelly (GBR); W	von Porat (NOR); L	did not advance		5
Emilio Bonfigli	Middleweight	Daney (FRA); L	did not advance				17
Rinaldo Castellenghi	Flyweight	Bye	Gourdy (FRA); W	Biete (ESP); W	LaBarba (USA); L	Fee (USA); L	4
Giuseppe Colacicco	Welterweight	Christensen (NOR); L	did not advance				17
Ferdinando De Petrillo	Lightweight	Savignac (FRA); L	did not advance				17
Livio Francecchini	Featherweight	MacGowan (CAN); W	Devergnies (BEL); L	did not advance			9
Amedeo Grillo	Light heavyweight	Bye	Rossignon (FRA); L	did not advance			9
Gaetano Lanzi	Flyweight	Recalde (URU); W	LaBarba (USA); L	did not advance			9
Orlando Leopardi	Middleweight	Henning (CAN); L	did not advance				17
Luigi Marfut	Lightweight	Haddad (EGY); W	Copello (ARG); L	did not advance			9
Giuseppe Oldani	Welterweight	Nielsen (DEN); W	Lewis (CAN); L	did not advance			9
Bruno Petrarca	Featherweight	Bye	Sauthier (SUI); W	Salas (USA); L	did not advance		5
Armando Ricciardi	Bantamweight	Pertuzzo (ARG); L	did not advance				17
Carlo Saraudi	Light heavyweight	Bye	Lindberg (DEN); W	Courtis (GBR); W	Mitchell (GBR); L	Sørsdal (NOR); L	4
Carlo Scotti	Heavyweight	N/A	Petersen (DEN); L	did not advance			9

Opponent nation	Wins	Losses	Percent
Argentina	0	2	.000
Belgium	0	1	.000
Canada	1	2	.333
Denmark	2	1	.667
Egypt	1	0	1.000
France	1	4	.200
Great Britain	2	1	.667
Norway	0	3	.000
Spain	1	0	1.000
Switzerland	1	0	1.000
United States	0	4	.000
Uruguay	1	0	1.000
Total	10	18	.357

Round	Wins	Losses	Percent
Round of 32	4	6	.400
Round of 16	4	6	.400
Quarterfinals	2	2	.500
Semifinals	0	2	.000
Final	0	0	–
Bronze match	0	2	.000
Total	10	18	.357

== Cycling ==
Ten cyclists represented Italy in 1924. It was the nation's fourth appearance in the sport. Italy took a single cycling medal in 1924, successfully defending the nation's championship in the team pursuit competition (though none of the winning 1920 cyclists were on the 1924 team).

=== Road cycling ===
Ranks given are within the heat.

Cyclist	Event	Final	
Cyclist	Event	Result	Rank
Ardito Bresciani	Time trial	6:41:39.4	12
Nello Ciaccheri	Time trial	6:50:10.0	18
Luigi Magnotti	Time trial	6:53:25.0	20
Antonio Negrini	Time trial	6:48:09.8	15
Ardito Bresciani; Nello Ciaccheri; Luigi Magnotti; Antonio Negrini	Team time trial	20:19:59.2	5

=== Track cycling ===
Ranks given are within the heat.

Cyclist	Event	First round		First repechage		Quarterfinals		Second repechage		Semifinals		Final	
Cyclist	Event	Result	Rank	Result	Rank	Result	Rank	Result	Rank	Result	Rank	Result	Rank
Guglielmo Bossi	Sprint	13.6	1 Q	Advanced directly		Unknown	2 r	Unknown	1 Q	Unknown	3	did not advance	
Angelo de Martino	50 km	N/A										Unknown	4
Francesco del Grosso	50 km	N/A										Unknown	8–36
Francesco del Grosso	Sprint	12.8	1 Q	Advanced directly		13.6	1 Q	Advanced directly		Unknown	3	did not advance	
Alfredo Dinale	50 km	N/A										Unknown	6
Angelo de Martini; Alfredo Dinale; Aleardo Menegazzi; Francesco Zucchetti	Team pursuit	5:23.2	1 Q	N/A		5:13.8	1 Q	N/A		5:12.0	1 Q	5:15.0	1st place, gold medalist(s)

== Diving ==
A single diver represented Italy in 1924. It was the nation's fourth appearance in the sport. 1924 was the fourth consecutive Games in which Italy had sent a single man in diving; Cangiullo continued the nation's lack of finals advancement.

Ranks given are within the heat.

Men

Diver	Event	Semifinals			Final		
Diver	Event	Points	Score	Rank	Points	Score	Rank
Luigi Cangiullo	10 m platform	20	398.8	4	did not advance		

== Equestrian ==
Five equestrians represented Italy in 1924. It was the nation's third appearance in the sport. Tommaso Lequio di Assaba, the defending gold medalist in the individual jumping, took silver this time. The eventing team also took bronze. It was the first time Italy finished without an equestrian gold medal.

Equestrian	Event	Final		
Equestrian	Event	Score	Time	Rank
Alessandro Alvisi	Eventing	1536.0	N/A	12
Alessandro Alvisi	Jumping	28.75	2:42.4	26
Emanuele Beraudo Di Pralormo	Eventing	1404.5	N/A	17
Emanuele Beraudo Di Pralormo	Jumping	did not finish		
Tommaso Lequio di Assaba	Eventing	did not finish		
Tommaso Lequio di Assaba	Jumping	8.75	2:42.0	2nd place, silver medalist(s)
Alberto Lombardi	Eventing	1572.0	N/A	11
Leone Valle	Jumping	20.00	2:36.6	15
Alessandro Alvisi; Emanuele Beraudo Di Pralormo; Tommaso Lequio di Assaba; Alberto Lombardi	Team eventing	4512.5	N/A	3rd place, bronze medalist(s)
Alessandro Alvisi; Emanuele Beraudo Di Pralormo; Tommaso Lequio di Assaba; Leone Valle	Team jumping	57.50	N/A	5

== Fencing ==
19 fencers, all men, represented Italy in 1924. It was the nation's fifth appearance in the sport. The absence of Nedo Nadi (by then a professional) and the heightened performance of France's Roger Ducret resulted in a relative down year for the Italian team, which defended only one of its five titles from 1920.

All six of the country's individual event competitors reached the finals; none won a medal. All three of the country's team event squads reached the finals; they won a gold medal in the sabre and a bronze in the épée. The team sabre competition pitted the defending champion Italian squad against a powerhouse Hungary team which had been excluded from competition in 1920. The four-team final pool was dominated by the two teams, and the match between them decided gold. That match was one of the closest of the 1924 Games, with the teams splitting the bouts 8 to 8 and Italy winning via tie-breaker: 50 touches to 46.

Men

Ranks given are within the pool.

Fencer	Event	Round 1		Round 2		Quarterfinals		Semifinals		Final	
Fencer	Event	Result	Rank	Result	Rank	Result	Rank	Result	Rank	Result	Rank
Marcello Bertinetti	Sabre	N/A				4–1	2 Q	6–2	2 Q	did not start	
Bino Bini	Sabre	N/A				3–3	4 Q	7–1	1 Q	did not start	
Renzo Compagna	Épée	7–2	2 Q	N/A		7–3	2 Q	6–5	2 Q	2–9	11
Virgilio Mantegazza	Épée	6–3	2 Q	N/A		6–3	1 Q	9–2	1 Q	6–5	6
Oreste Puliti	Sabre	N/A				5–0	1 Q	7–1	1 Q	Disqualified	
Giulio Sarrocchi	Sabre	N/A				6–1	1 Q	5–3	4 Q	did not start	
Giulio Basletta; Marcello Bertinetti; Giovanni Canova; Vincenzo Cuccia; Virgilio Mantegazza; Oreste Moricca	Team épée	1–1	2 Q	N/A		1–0	2 Q	1–0	1 Q	1–2	3rd place, bronze medalist(s)
Renato Anselmi; Guido Balzarini; Marcello Bertinetti; Bino Bini; Vincenzo Cuccia; Oreste Moricca; Oreste Puliti; Giulio Sarrocchi	Team sabre	2–0	1 Q	N/A		2–0	2 Q	1–0	1 Q	3–0	1st place, gold medalist(s)
Valentino Argento; Aldo Boni; Dante Carniel; Giorgio Chiavacci; Luigi Cuomo; Giulio Guadini; Giorgio Pessina; Oreste Puliti	Team foil	Bye		N/A		3–0	1 Q	1–0	1 Q	did not finish	

== Football ==
Italy competed in the Olympic football tournament for the third time in 1924.

Round 1

May 25, 1924

Italy	1–0	Spain
Vallana 84' (o.g.)	Report

Stade Olympique, Colombes
Attendance: 20,000
Referee: Marcel Slawik (FRA)

Round 2

May 29, 1924
14:15

Italy	2–0	Luxembourg
Baloncieri 20'; Della Valle 38'	Report

Stade Pershing
Attendance: 2,000
Referee: Jean Richard (FRA)

Quarterfinals

June 2, 1924
17:00

Switzerland	2–1	Italy
Sturzenegger 47'; Abegglen 60'	Report	Della Valle 52'

Stade Bergeyre
Attendance: 12,000
Referee: Johannes Mutters (NED)

Final rank
5th place

Roster

- Giovanni De Prà
- Giampiero Combi
- Gastone Baldi
- Giuseppe Aliberti
- Adolfo Baloncieri
- Ottavio Barbieri
- Luigi Burlando
- Umberto Caligaris
- Leopoldo Conti
- Giuseppe Della Valle
- Virgilio Levratto
- Mario Magnozzi
- Virginio Rosetta
- Renzo De Vecchi
- Severino Rosso
- Antonio Fayenz
- Antonio Janni
- Antonio Bruna
- Mario Ardissone
- Feliciano Monti
- Giuseppe Calvi
- Cesare Martin

== Gymnastics ==
Eight gymnasts represented Italy in 1924. It was the nation's fifth appearance in the sport. The Italian team won its third consecutive gold medal in the team event (in part at least due to Czechoslovakia's failure to finish), though were kept out of the individual all-around medals after having had an individual all-around gold medalist the previous two Games.

Mandrini had the best all-around result of the Italians, placing fourth despite earning no better than seventh in any single apparatus. Francesco Martino took the gold medal in the rings, while Zampori earned bronze in the parallel bars.

=== Artistic ===
Gymnast	Event	Final	
Gymnast	Event	Score	Rank
Luigi Cambiaso	All-around	101.320	17
Luigi Cambiaso	Horizontal bar	17.180	21
Luigi Cambiaso	Parallel bars	20.90	14
Luigi Cambiaso	Pommel horse	14.740	44
Luigi Cambiaso	Rings	19.980	17
Luigi Cambiaso	Rope climbing	10 (9.0 s)	18
Luigi Cambiaso	Sidehorse vault	9.15	30
Luigi Cambiaso	Vault	9.37	14
Mario Lertora	All-around	103.619	10
Mario Lertora	Horizontal bar	18.366	12
Mario Lertora	Parallel bars	21.33	5
Mario Lertora	Pommel horse	17.160	29
Mario Lertora	Rings	20.333	15
Mario Lertora	Rope climbing	10 (8.6 s)	10
Mario Lertora	Sidehorse vault	9.11	32
Mario Lertora	Vault	7.32	34
Vittorio Lucchetti	All-around	102.803	12
Vittorio Lucchetti	Horizontal bar	17.270	20
Vittorio Lucchetti	Parallel bars	20.33	22
Vittorio Lucchetti	Pommel horse	18.190	19
Vittorio Lucchetti	Rings	20.913	9
Vittorio Lucchetti	Rope climbing	10 (9.0 s)	18
Vittorio Lucchetti	Sidehorse vault	9.20	28
Vittorio Lucchetti	Vault	6.90	45
Luigi Maiocco	All-around	92.486	33
Luigi Maiocco	Horizontal bar	14.663	40
Luigi Maiocco	Parallel bars	18.28	47
Luigi Maiocco	Pommel horse	18.130	20
Luigi Maiocco	Rings	19.333	22
Luigi Maiocco	Rope climbing	5 (10.0 s)	39
Luigi Maiocco	Sidehorse vault	8.33	50
Luigi Maiocco	Vault	8.75	21
Ferdinando Mandrini	All-around	105.583	4
Ferdinando Mandrini	Horizontal bar	18.120	14
Ferdinando Mandrini	Parallel bars	20.21	24
Ferdinando Mandrini	Pommel horse	17.060	30
Ferdinando Mandrini	Rings	20.943	8
Ferdinando Mandrini	Rope climbing	10 (9.0 s)	18
Ferdinando Mandrini	Sidehorse vault	9.50	21
Ferdinando Mandrini	Vault	9.75	7
Francesco Martino	All-around	101.529	16
Francesco Martino	Horizontal bar	18.386	11
Francesco Martino	Parallel bars	20.89	15
Francesco Martino	Pommel horse	17.290	28
Francesco Martino	Rings	21.553	1st place, gold medalist(s)
Francesco Martino	Rope climbing	10 (8.8 s)	13
Francesco Martino	Sidehorse vault	8.58	44
Francesco Martino	Vault	4.83	57
Giuseppe Paris	All-around	101.169	18
Giuseppe Paris	Horizontal bar	16.356	27
Giuseppe Paris	Parallel bars	20.86	16
Giuseppe Paris	Pommel horse	20.100	5
Giuseppe Paris	Rings	19.743	18
Giuseppe Paris	Rope climbing	8 (9.4 s)	24
Giuseppe Paris	Sidehorse vault	9.03	36
Giuseppe Paris	Vault	7.08	41
Giorgio Zampori	All-around	96.549	26
Giorgio Zampori	Horizontal bar	16.203	30
Giorgio Zampori	Parallel bars	21.45	3rd place, bronze medalist(s)
Giorgio Zampori	Pommel horse	17.730	23
Giorgio Zampori	Rings	20.246	16
Giorgio Zampori	Rope climbing	6 (9.8 s)	35
Giorgio Zampori	Sidehorse vault	9.42	24
Giorgio Zampori	Vault	5.50	53
Luigi Cambiaso; Mario Lertora; Vittorio Lucchetti; Luigi Maiocco; Ferdinando Mandrini; Francesco Martino; Giuseppe Paris; Giorgio Zampori	Team	839.058	1st place, gold medalist(s)

== Modern pentathlon ==
Four pentathletes represented Italy in 1924. It was the nation's second appearance in the sport.

Pentathlete	Event	Final	
Pentathlete	Event	Score	Rank
Omero Chiesa	Individual	109	24
Ernesto Corradi	Individual	127.5	30
Giuseppe Micheli	Individual	137	33
Gaspare Pasta	Individual	142	36

== Rowing ==
17 rowers represented Italy in 1924. It was the nation's fourth appearance in the sport. Italy took two medals.

Ranks given are within the heat.

Rower	Event	Semifinals		Repechage		Final	
Rower	Event	Result	Rank	Result	Rank	Result	Rank
Ercole Olgeni; Giovanni Scatturin; Gino Sopracordevole	Coxed pair	Unknown	2 Q	N/A		8:39.1	2nd place, silver medalist(s)
Massimo Ballestrero; Renato Berninzone; Marcello Casanova; Ludovico Cerato; Jean Cipollina	Coxed four	7:13.0	1 Q	Advanced directly		Unknown	4
Ante Katalinić; Frane Katalinić; Šimun Katalinić; Giuseppe Crivelli; Latino Galasso; Vittorio Gliubich; Petar Ivanov; Bruno Sorić; Carlo Toniatti	Eight	6:06.0	1 Q	Advanced directly		Unknown	3rd place, bronze medalist(s)

== Sailing ==
Three sailors represented Italy in 1924. It was the nation's debut in the sport.

Sailor	Event	Qualifying				Final			
Sailor	Event	Race 1	Race 2	Race 3	Total	Race 1	Race 2	Total	Rank
Carlo Masi; Cencio Massola; Roberto Moscatelli	6 metre class	5	5	8 (DNF)	18	did not advance			7

== Shooting ==
Fourteen sport shooters represented Italy in 1924. It was the nation's third appearance in the sport.

Shooter	Event	Final	
Shooter	Event	Score	Rank
Alberto Coletti Conti	600 m free rifle	84	14
Sem De Ranieri	600 m free rifle	62	65
Camillo Isnardi	50 m rifle, prone	377	40
Giuseppe Laveni	50 m rifle, prone	357	61
Giuseppe Laveni	600 m free rifle	86	10
Ernesto Panza	50 m rifle, prone	376	41
Emilio Piersantelli	25 m rapid fire pistol	14	37
Nicola Rebisso	Trap	Unknown	31–44
Giacomo Rossi	Trap	Unknown	31–44
Giovanni Scarella	25 m rapid fire pistol	8	51
Giacomo Serra	Trap	90	19
Ricardo Ticchi	50 m rifle, prone	370	51
Ricardo Ticchi	600 m free rifle	73	51
Alberto Coletti Conti; Sem De Ranieri; Camillo Isnardi; Giuseppe Laveni; Ricardo Ticchi	Team free rifle	578	10
Giuseppe Bellotto; Federico Cesarano; Salvatore Lucchesi; Nicola Rebisso; Giacomo Rossi; Giacomo Serra	Team clay pigeons	Unknown	31–44

== Swimming ==
Ranks given are within the heat.

Men

Swimmer	Event	Heats		Semifinals		Final	
Swimmer	Event	Result	Rank	Result	Rank	Result	Rank
Luigi Bacigalupo	1500 m freestyle	25:04.4	3	did not advance			
Emerico Biach	200 m breaststroke	3:26.8	5	did not advance			
Luciano Trolli	200 m breaststroke	3:23.0	5	did not advance			
Luigi Bacigalupo; Agostino Frassinetti; Gianni Patrignani; Emilio Polli	4 × 200 m freestyle relay	11:05.2	2 Q	11:00.4	4	did not advance	

== Tennis ==
Men

Athlete	Event	Round of 128	Round of 64	Round of 32	Round of 16	Quarterfinals	Semifinals	Final	
Athlete	Event	Opposition Score	Opposition Score	Opposition Score	Opposition Score	Opposition Score	Opposition Score	Opposition Score	Rank
Umberto de Morpurgo	Singles	Wolff (LUX); W 6–1, 6–0, 6–0	Debran (SUI); W 6–2, 6–3, 6–3	Zerlentis (GRE); W 6–0, 6–2, 6–4	Washer (BEL); W 2–6, 6–4, 1–6, 6–4, 8–6	Harada (JPN); W 6–4, 6–1, 6–1	Richards (USA); L 3–6, 6–3, 1–6, 4–6	Bronze medal final Borotra (FRA); W 1–6, 6–1, 8–6, 4–6, 7–5	3rd place, bronze medalist(s)
Clemente Serventi	Singles	Washburn (USA); L 4–7, 3–6, 4–6	did not advance						
Umberto de Morpurgo; Clemente Serventi	Doubles	—N/a	Bye	Washer / de Laveleye (BEL); W 6–4, 6–4, 7–5	Brugnon / Cochet (FRA); L 2–6, 4–6, 2–6	did not advance			

Women

Athlete	Event	Round of 64	Round of 32	Round of 16	Quarterfinals	Semifinals	Final	
Athlete	Event	Opposition Score	Opposition Score	Opposition Score	Opposition Score	Opposition Score	Opposition Score	Rank
Paola Bologna	Singles	Bye	Golding (FRA); L 0–6, 3–6	did not advance				
Rosetta Gagliardi	Singles	Brehm (DEN); W 6–0, 6–2	Blair-White (IRL); W 4–6, 7–5, 6–2	Shepherd-Barron (GBR); L 1–6, 0–6	did not advance			
Giulia Perelli	Singles	Bye	Torras (ESP); L 4–6, 6–4, 6–8	did not advance				
Rosetta Gagliardi; Giulia Perelli	Doubles	—N/a	Bye	Bye	Billout / Bourgeois (FRA); L 5–7, 1–6	did not advance		

Mixed

Athlete	Event	Round of 32	Round of 16	Quarterfinals	Semifinals	Final	
Athlete	Event	Opposition Score	Opposition Score	Opposition Score	Opposition Score	Opposition Score	Rank
Umberto de Morpurgo; Giulia Perelli	Doubles	Torras / Saprisa (ESP); W 6–3, 8–6	McKane / Gilbert (GBR); L 7–9, 6–1, 5–7	did not advance			

== Water polo ==
Italy made its second Olympic water polo appearance.

Roster

- Tito Ambrosini
- Ottone Andreancich
- Mario Balla
- Gian Battista Benvenuto
- Arnoldo Berruti
- Mario Cazzaniga
- Eugenio Della Casa
- Achille Francesco Gavoglio
- Emilio Gavoglio
- Carmine De Luca
- Giuseppe M. Valle

First round

Sweden	7–0	Italy	Piscine des Tourelles

== Weightlifting ==
Athlete	Event	1H Snatch	1H Clean & Jerk	Press	Snatch	Clean & Jerk	Total	Rank
Cesare Bonetti	Men's -67.5 kg	60	70	80	77.5	105	392.5	13
Filippo Bottino	Men's +82.5 kg						495	6
Giuseppe Conca	Men's -60 kg	X	50	75	65	85	275	18
Salvatore Epicoco	Men's +82.5 kg						455	=11
Dante Figoli	Men's -75 kg	65	77.5	82.5	77.5	105	407.5	10
Pierino Gabetti	Men's -60 kg	65	77.5	72.5	82.5	105	402.5	1st place, gold medalist(s)
Carlo Galimberti	Men's -75 kg	77.5	95	97.5	95	127.5	492.5	1st place, gold medalist(s)
Mario Giambielli	Men's -82.5 kg	77.5	97.5	82.5	95	130	480	6
Giuseppe Merlin	Men's -82.5 kg	62.5	65	85	82.5	110	405	16
Gastone Pierini	Men's -67.5 kg	55	72.5	80	80	105	392.5	12
Enrico Pucci	Men's -75 kg	65	77.5	75	75	105	397.5	14
Silvio Quadrelli	Men's -67.5 kg	62.5	70	72.5	80	105	390	16
Sante Scarcia	Men's -60 kg	55	65	70	62.5	90	342.5	15
Giuseppe Tonani	Men's +82.5 kg						517.5 OR	1st place, gold medalist(s)
Armando Tugnoli	Men's -82.5 kg	55	70	75	75	100	375	18

== Wrestling ==
=== Freestyle wrestling ===
Men's

Athlete	Event	Round of 32	Round of 16	Quarterfinal	Semifinal	Final	
Athlete	Event	Opposition Result	Opposition Result	Opposition Result	Opposition Result	Opposition Result	Rank
Enrico Bonassin	Middleweight	—N/a	Ollivier (BEL); L	Did not advance	Bronze medal semifinal Pekkala (FIN); L	did not advance	
Fernando Cavallini	Featherweight	Bye	Chilcott (CAN); L	did not advance			
Fabio del Genovese	Light heavyweight	—N/a	Kappeler (FRA); W	Westergren (SWE); L	did not advance		
Riccardo Pizzocaro	Lightweight	—N/a	Jourdain (FRA); L	did not advance			
Piero Tordera	Bantamweight	—N/a	Darby (GBR); L	did not advance			

=== Greco-Roman ===
Men's

Athlete	Event	First round	Second round	Third round	Fourth round	Fifth round	Sixth round	Seventh round	Eighth round	Rank
Athlete	Event	Opposition Result	Opposition Result	Opposition Result	Opposition Result	Opposition Result	Opposition Result	Opposition Result	Opposition Result	Rank
Dante Ceccatelli	Light heavyweight	Varga (HUN); L	Wecksten (FIN); L	did not advance					—N/a	=12
Aleardo Donati	Heavyweight	Sint (NED); L	Nilsson (SWE); L	did not advance				—N/a		=13
Marcello Giuria	Heavyweight	Salila (FIN); L	Polis (LAT); L	did not advance				—N/a		=13
Amadeo Gorgano	Middleweight	Jahren (NOR); L	Fischer (AUT); L	did not advance					—N/a	=20
Giuseppe Gorletti	Middleweight	Fischer (AUT); L	Pražský (TCH); W	Jahren (NOR); W	Kónyi (HUN); W	Steinberg (EST); W	Lindfors (FIN); L	Did not advance	—N/a	4
Giovanni Gozzi	Bantamweight	Ikonen (FIN); L	Koolmann (EST); W	Ahlfors (FIN); L	did not advance			—N/a		=13
Roberto de Marchi	Lightweight	Kratochvíl (TCH); L	Keresztes (HUN); L	did not advance				—N/a		=20
Carlo Ponte	Bantamweight	Olsen (NOR); L	Bozděch (TCH); L	did not advance				—N/a		=17
Enrico Porro	Featherweight	Malmberg (SWE); L	Capron (FRA); L	did not advance						=18
Gerolamo Quaglia	Featherweight	Dyršmid (TCH); L	Torgensen (DEN); L	did not advance						=18
Walter Ranghieri	Lightweight	Borgström (SWE); L	Metayer (FRA); W	Kusnets (EST); L	did not advance			—N/a		=13
Bruto Testonni	Light heavyweight	Moustafa (EGY); L	Retired; L	did not advance					—N/a	=21
