= 1924 United States Olympic trials (track and field) =

American athletics championship event

1924 United States Olympic trials for track and field
- Dates: 13–14 June
- Host city: Cambridge, Massachusetts
- Venue: Harvard Stadium
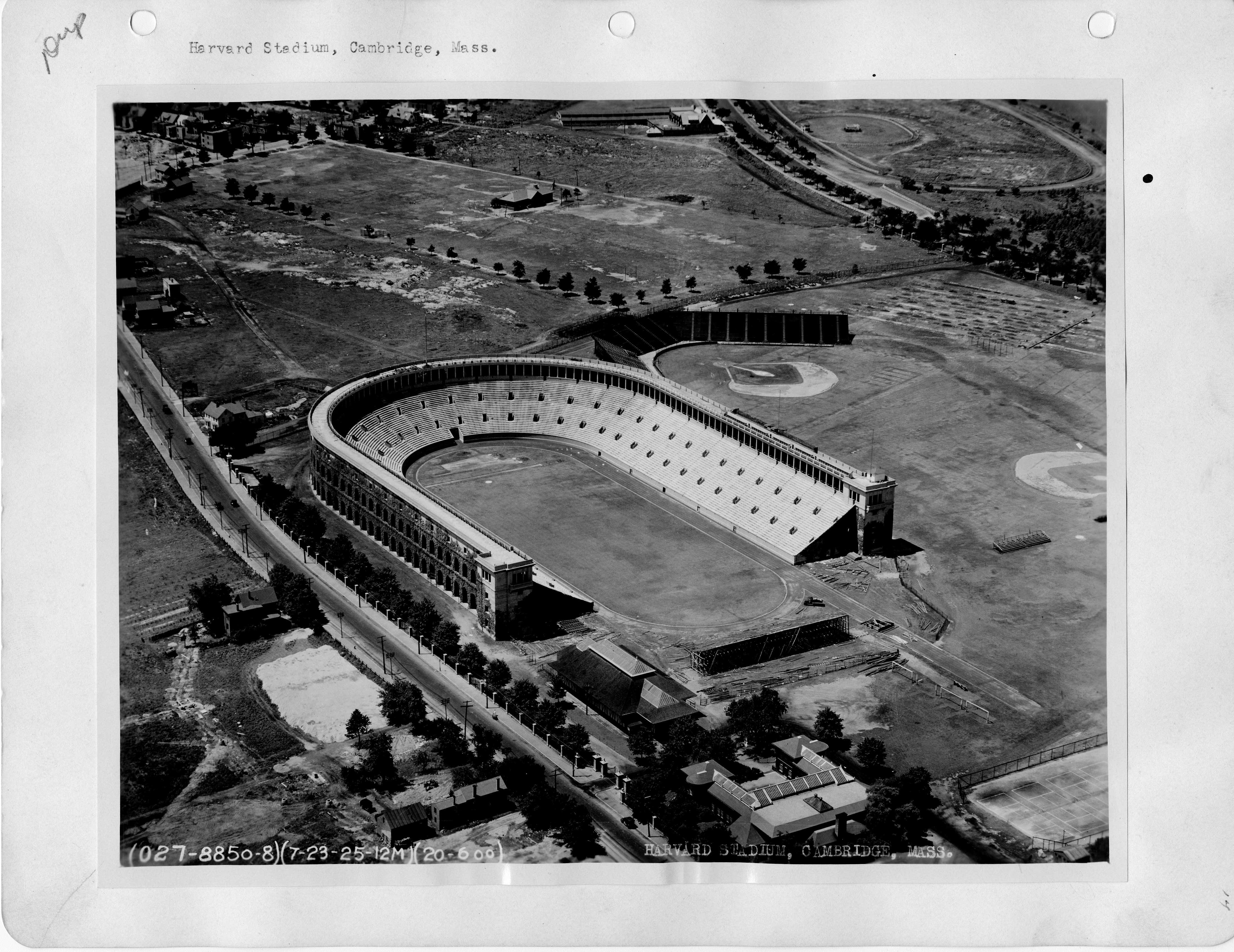

The 1924 United States Olympic trials for track and field were held from 13–14 June 1924 and decided the United States team for the 1924 Summer Olympics in Paris. As women's athletics was not added to the Olympic programme until 1928, only a men's trials was held. The competitions took place in Cambridge, Massachusetts at Harvard Stadium.

The meeting was separate from the 1924 USA Outdoor Track and Field Championships, which were held later in September in New Jersey and Pennsylvania.

A maximum of four athletes could be named to the team per event, unlike the three-athlete-limit of future Olympics. Also unlike future Olympic trials, the 1924 trials results were not completely determinative of the team; in several cases athletes who finished outside of the top 4 were selected based on consistency of previous results.

Unlike other events, six Americans were allowed to compete in the 1924 Olympic marathon. Five of those spots were decided from the 1924 Boston Marathon, including Clarence DeMar (1st), Charles Mellor (2nd), Frank Wendling (3rd), William Churchill (4th), and Ralph Williams (7th). The final runner, Frank Zuna, was selected based on his results from a marathon in Baltimore instead.

== Results ==
=== Men ===
Key:

Indicates athlete was selected to event's Olympic team

Event	First		Second		Third		Fourth	
100 m	Chester Bowman	10.6	Charles Paddock	10.6 e	none awarded		Frank Hussey (Note: Loren Murchison, who finished 7th in 10.8 estimated, was chosen for the 100 m team instead of Hussey.)	10.7 e
100 m	Chester Bowman	10.6	Jackson Scholz	10.6 e	none awarded		Frank Hussey	10.7 e
200 m	Jackson Scholz	21.0	Bayes Norton	21.2 e	George Hill	21.3 e	Louis Clarke (Note: Charles Paddock, who finished 6th in 21.6 estimated, was chosen for the 200 m team instead of Clarke.)	21.4 e
400 m	J. Coard Taylor	48.1	Horatio Fitch	48.4 e	Ray Robertson	48.4 e	Eric Wilson	48.5 e
800 m	William Richardson	1:53.6	Schuyler Enck	1:53.7 e	Ray Dodge	1:53.9 e	Ray Watson (Note: John Watters was chosen for the 800 m team instead of Watson. Watters' exact trials placing is unknown, but he finished either 6th or 7th according to Track and Field News.)	1:55 e
1500 m	Ray Buker	3:55.8	Lloyd Hahn	3:56.8 e	William Spencer	3:57.1 e	James Connolly (Note: Ray Watson was chosen for the 1500 m team instead of Connolly. Watson didn't contest the 1500 m at the trials, but he finished 4th in the 800 m.)	
5000 m	John Romig	15:15.7	Harold Phelps	15:18.5 e	Rilus Doolittle	15:19.2 e	William Cox (Note: George Lermond, who finished 5th, was chosen for the 5000 m team instead of Cox.)	
10,000 m	Verne Booth	32:14.6	John Gray (Note: Only three Americans competed on the 10,000 m team. Earl Johnson, who did not compete at the trials, was selected instead of Gray and Fager.)	32:16.5 e	August Fager		Wayne Johnson	
110 m hurdles	George Guthrie	15.0	Daniel Kinsey		Franklin Johnson		Karl Anderson	
400 m hurdles	F. Morgan Taylor	52.6	Charles Brookins	52.8 e	Chan Coulter (Note: Only three Americans were named to the 400 m hurdles team, and Coulter was excluded over Riley.)		Ivan Riley	
3000 m steeplechase	Russell Payne	9:47.1	Marvin Rick	9:48.0 e	Michael Devaney	10:00.0 e	Jens Jensen (Note: Only the top three were named to the American steeplechase team.)	
High jump	Tom Poor	1.92 m	none awarded		Sam Campbell (Note: Only three Americans were named to the high jump team. Leroy Brown was injured but was excused from jumping in the final by the U.S. team coach, and he was selected instead of Campbell, Russell, and Juday.)	1.89 m	none awarded	
High jump	Harold Osborn	1.92 m	none awarded		Robert Juday	1.89 m	none awarded	
High jump	Harold Osborn	1.92 m	none awarded		Justin Russell	1.89 m	none awarded	
Pole vault	Glenn Graham	3.96 m	none awarded		none awarded		none awarded	
Pole vault	James Brooker	3.96 m	none awarded		none awarded		none awarded	
Pole vault	Ralph Spearow	3.96 m	none awarded		none awarded		none awarded	
Pole vault	Lee Barnes	3.96 m	none awarded		none awarded		none awarded	
Long jump	William DeHart Hubbard	7.63 m	Edward Gourdin	7.28 m	Albert Rose	7.19 m	William Dowding (Note: William Comins, who finished 5th with 7.10 m, was selected instead of Dowding for the high jump team.)	7.12 m
Triple jump	Merwin Graham	14.32 m	MacCullough Keeble (Note: Only two athletes were selected for the American triple jump team, and Wilson was chosen ahead of Keeble despite finishing behind Keeble.)	14.21 m	Earl Wilson	14.13 m	Homer Martin	14.12 m
Shot put	Clarence Houser	15.22 m	Glenn Hartranft	14.94 m	Ralph Hills	14.93 m	Norman Anderson	14.83 m
Discus throw	Thomas Lieb	46.78 m	Augustus Pope	45.97 m	Charles Ashton (Note: The trials 5th-placer Glenn Hartranft, who threw 43.20 m, was selected instead of Ashton.)	44.07 m	Clarence Houser	43.84 m
Hammer throw	Fredrick Tootell	50.80 m	Matthew McGrath	50.54 m	Jack Merchant	49.58 m	James McEachern	46.81 m
Javelin throw	William Neufeld	58.25 m	Lee Priester	56.58 m	Homer Whelchel	55.65 m	William Healy (Note: Trials 5th-placer Eugene Oberst, who threw 54.94 m, was selected instead of Healy.)	55.34 m
Decathlon	Harold Osborn	7377.38 pts	Emerson Norton	7023.94 pts	Harry Frieda	6842.58 pts	Otto Anderson	6636.02

== See also ==
- 1924 USA Outdoor Track and Field Championships
- 1924 USA Indoor Track and Field Championships
- List of USA Outdoor Track and Field Championships winners (men)
- List of USA Outdoor Track and Field Championships winners (women)
