= Wrestling at the 1924 Summer Olympics – Men's Greco-Roman lightweight =

Wrestling at the Olympics

Men's lightweight Greco-Roman wrestling at the Games of the VIII Olympiad
- Venue: Vélodrome d'Hiver
- Dates: July 6–10, 1924
- Competitors: 28 from 18 nations

Medalists
| 1st place, gold medalist(s) | | Oskari Friman | Finland |
| 2nd place, silver medalist(s) | | Lajos Keresztes | Hungary |
| 3rd place, bronze medalist(s) | | Kalle Westerlund | Finland |

The men's Greco-Roman lightweight was a Greco-Roman wrestling event held as part of the Wrestling at the 1924 Summer Olympics programme. It was the fourth appearance of the event. Lightweight was the third-lightest category, including wrestlers weighing 62 to 67 kilograms.

== Results ==
Source: Official results; Wudarski

The tournament was double-elimination.

=== First round ===
| Losses | Winner | Loser | Losses |
|---|---|---|---|
| 0 | Oskari Friman (FIN) | Arne Gaupset (NOR) | 1 |
| 0 | Josef Beránek (TCH) | Sidney Bergmann (AUT) | 1 |
| 0 | Alfred Praks (EST) | Holger Askehave (DEN) | 1 |
| 0 | Leon Rękawek (POL) | Vasilios Pavlidis (GRE) | 1 |
| 0 | Rūdolfs Ronis (LAT) | Louis Christoffel (BEL) | 1 |
| 0 | Karl Westerlund (FIN) | Fuat Akbaş (TUR) | 1 |
| 0 | Lajos Keresztes (HUN) | Ahmed Rahmy (EGY) | 1 |
| 0 | František Kratochvíl (TCH) | Roberto De Marchi (ITA) | 1 |
| 0 | Carl Coerse (NED) | Francisco Solé (ESP) | 1 |
| 0 | Frants Frisenfeldt (DEN) | Erling Michelsen (NOR) | 1 |
| 0 | Albert Kusnets (EST) | Georges Metayer (FRA) | 1 |
| 0 | Otto Borgström (SWE) | Walter Ranghieri (ITA) | 1 |
| 0 | Mihály Matura (HUN) | Ludwig Sesta (AUT) | 1 |
| 0 | Paul Parisel (FRA) | Englebert Mollin (BEL) | 1 |

=== Second round ===
| Losses | Winner | Loser | Losses |
|---|---|---|---|
| 0 | Oskari Friman (FIN) | Josef Beránek (TCH) | 1 |
| 1 | Arne Gaupset (NOR) | Johann Bergmann (AUT) | 2 |
| 0 | Alfred Praks (EST) | Leon Rękawek (POL) | 1 |
| 1 | Holger Askehave (DEN) | Vasilios Pavlidis (GRE) | 2 |
| 0 | Rūdolfs Ronis (LAT) | Fuat Akbaş (TUR) | 2 |
| 0 | Karl Westerlund (FIN) | Louis Christoffel (BEL) | 2 |
| 0 | Lajos Keresztes (HUN) | Roberto de Marchi (ITA) | 2 |
| 0 | František Kratochvíl (TCH) | Ahmed Rahmy (EGY) | 2 |
| 0 | Frants Frisenfeldt (DEN) | Carl Coerse (NED) | 1 |
| 1 | Francisco Solé (ESP) | Erling Michelsen (NOR) | 2 |
| 0 | Albert Kusnets (EST) | Otto Borgström (SWE) | 1 |
| 1 | Walter Ranghieri (ITA) | Georges Metayer (FRA) | 2 |
| 0 | Mihály Matura (HUN) | Paul Parisel (FRA) | 1 |
| 1 | Ludwig Sesta (AUT) | Englebert Mollin (BEL) | 2 |

=== Third round ===
| Losses | Winner | Loser | Losses |
|---|---|---|---|
| 1 | Arne Gaupset (NOR) | Josef Beránek (TCH) | 2 |
| 0 | Rūdolfs Ronis (LAT) | Alfred Praks (EST) | 1 |
| 1 | Holger Askehave (DEN) | Leon Rękawek (POL) | 2 |
| 0 | Lajos Keresztes (HUN) | Karl Westerlund (FIN) | 1 |
| 0 | František Kratochvíl (TCH) | Carl Coerse (NED) | 2 |
| 0 | Frants Frisenfeldt (DEN) | Francisco Solé (ESP) | 2 |
| 0 | Albert Kusnets (EST) | Walter Ranghieri (ITA) | 2 |
| 0 | Mihály Matura (HUN) | Otto Borgström (SWE) | 2 |
| 1 | Ludwig Sesta (AUT) | Paul Parisel (FRA) | 2 |
| 0 | Oskari Friman (FIN) | Bye | – |

=== Fourth round ===
| Losses | Winner | Loser | Losses |
|---|---|---|---|
| 1 | Arne Gaupset (NOR) | Ludwig Sesta (AUT) | 2 |
| 0 | Lajos Keresztes (HUN) | Rūdolfs Ronis (LAT) | 1 |
| 1 | Karl Westerlund (FIN) | Alfred Praks (EST) | 2 |
| 0 | Oskari Friman (FIN) | Holger Askehave (DEN) | 2 |
| 0 | František Kratochvíl (TCH) | Frants Frisenfeldt (DEN) | 1 |
| 0 | Albert Kusnets (EST) | Mihály Matura (HUN) | 1 |

=== Fifth round ===
| Losses | Winner | Loser | Losses |
|---|---|---|---|
| 0 | Albert Kusnets (EST) | Arne Gaupset (NOR) | 2 |
| 0 | Lajos Keresztes (HUN) | Frants Frisenfeldt (DEN) | 2 |
| 1 | Karl Westerlund (FIN) | František Kratochvíl (TCH) | 1 |
| 0 | Oskari Friman (FIN) | Mihály Matura (HUN) | 2 |
| – | Abandoned | Rūdolfs Ronis (LAT) | – |

=== Sixth round ===
This was the final round. Friman won gold, undefeated. Keresztes took silver and Westerlund bronze, as Kusnets finished fourth.

| Losses | Winner | Loser | Losses |
|---|---|---|---|
| 0 | Oskari Friman (FIN) | Lajos Keresztes (HUN) | 1 |
| 1 | Karl Westerlund (FIN) | Albert Kusnets (EST) | 1 |
| – | Abandoned | František Kratochvíl (TCH) | – |
