= Ernest Clark (disambiguation) =

Ernest Clark (1912–1994) was a British actor of stage, television and film.

Ernest Clark may also refer to:

- Ernest Clark (civil servant) (1864–1951), British civil servant and governor of Tasmania, 1933–1945
- Ernie Clark (American football) (1937–2024), American football player
- Ernest Clark (athlete) (1898–1993), British track and field athlete
- Ernie Clark (cinematographer), Australian cinematographer
- Ernest Ellis Clark (1869–1932), Derby born artist for Crown Derby porcelain
