= Verger (disambiguation) =

A verger is a person who assists in the ordering of religious services.

Verger or The Verger may also refer to:

- Verger (surname)
- El Verger, a town in Marina Alta, Alicante, Valencian Community, Spain
- Le Verger, a commune in Ille-et-Vilaine, Bretagne, France
- Saint-Quentin-le-Verger, a commune in the Marne department in north-eastern France
- "The Verger", a 1929 short story by Somerset Maugham
  - "The Verger", a segment of the 1950 anthology film Trio, based on the short story

== See also ==
- Vergere
