= Athletics at the 1924 Summer Olympics – Men's marathon =

Men's marathon at the Games of the VIII Olympiad
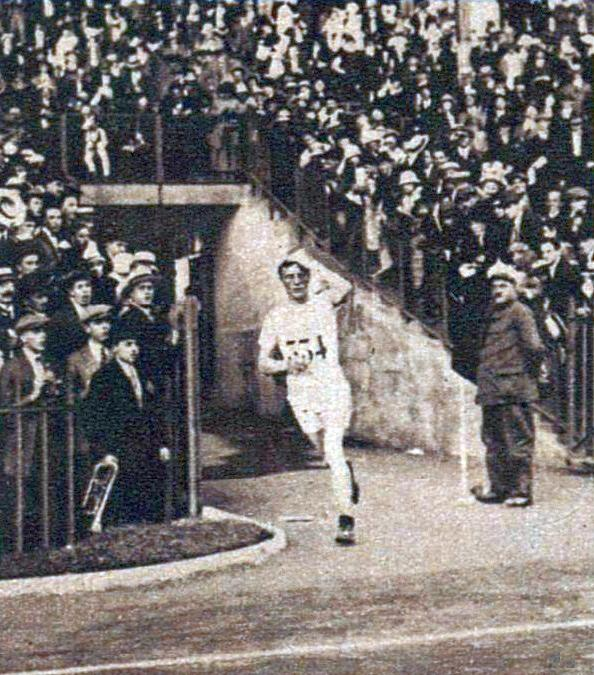
- Albin Stenroos entering the stadium
- Venue: Stade Olympique Yves-du-Manoir and nearby roads
- Date: July 13, 1924
- Competitors: 58 from 20 nations
- Winning time: 2:41:22.6

Medalists
1st place, gold medalist(s)		Albin Stenroos; Finland
2nd place, silver medalist(s)		Romeo Bertini; Italy
3rd place, bronze medalist(s)		Clarence DeMar; United States

The men's marathon event was part of the track and field athletics programme at the 1924 Summer Olympics, in Paris, France. The marathon was held on Sunday, July 13, 1924. It was only the second Olympic marathon to use the distance of 42.195 km (26 miles, 385 yards) which was first used in 1908 and is now the standard marathon distance. Fifty-eight runners from 20 nations competed, with no more than 6 runners per nation. The event was won by Albin Stenroos of Finland, the nation's second consecutive Olympic marathon victory.

== Background ==
This was the seventh appearance of the event, which is one of 12 athletics events to have been held at every Summer Olympics. The Finnish team included defending champion Hannes Kolehmainen as well as Albin Stenroos, who had won two medals in other events in 1912; Ville Kyrönen had been the winner in the Finnish Olympic trials, however. 1920 silver medalist Jüri Lossmann of Estonia also returned. Boughera El Ouafi of France, who would win gold in 1928, competed for the first time. The American team had Clarence DeMar, the Boston Marathon winner in 1911, 1922, 1923, and 1924, Charles Mellor, who had run the Olympic marathon in 1920 and would win the Boston marathon in 1925, and Frank Zuna, the 1921 Boston winner. Great Britain had Dunky Wright. Shizo Kanakuri of Japan, still considered a missing person in Sweden after disappearing during the 1912 Olympic marathon, competed (as he had in 1920 as well).

Czechoslovakia, Ecuador, and Spain each made their first appearance in Olympic marathons. The United States made its seventh appearance, the only nation to have competed in each Olympic marathon to that point.

== Records ==
Prior to this competition, the existing world and Olympic records were as follows:

World record	Hannes Kolehmainen (FIN)	2:32:35.8	Antwerp, Belgium	22 August 1920
Olympic record	Hannes Kolehmainen (FIN)	2:32:35.8	Antwerp, Belgium	22 August 1920

== Schedule ==
The race was delayed due to concerns about heat.

Date	Time	Round
Sunday, 13 July 1924	17:00	Final

== Results ==
The race was held on Sunday, July 13, 1924.

Rank	Athlete	Nation	Time
1st place, gold medalist(s)	Albin Stenroos	Finland	2:41:22.6
2nd place, silver medalist(s)	Romeo Bertini	Italy	2:47:19.6
3rd place, bronze medalist(s)	Clarence DeMar	United States	2:48:14.0
4	Lauri Halonen	Finland	2:49:47.4
5	Sam Ferris	Great Britain	2:52:26.0
6	Manuel Plaza	Chile	2:52:54.0
7	Boughéra El-Ouafi	France	2:54:19.6
8	Gustav Kinn	Sweden	2:54:33.4
9	Dionisio Carreras	Spain	2:57:18.4
10	Jüri Lossman	Estonia	2:57:54.6
11	Axel Jensen	Denmark	2:58:44.8
12	Jean-Baptiste Manhès	France	3:00:34.0
13	John Cuthbert	Canada	3:00:44.6
14	Victor McAuley	Canada	3:02:05.4
15	Marcel Alavoine	Belgium	3:03:20.0
16	Frank Wendling	United States	3:05:09.8
17	Arthur Farrimond	Great Britain	3:05:15.0
18	Frank Zuna	United States	3:05:52.2
19	Harry Phillips	South Africa	3:07:13.0
20	Augustinus Broos	Belgium	3:14:03.0
21	Waldemar Karlsson	Sweden	3:14:21.4
22	Tullio Biscuola	Italy	3:19:05.0
23	William Churchill	United States	3:19:18.0
24	Mohammed Ghermati	France	3:20:27.0
25	Charles Mellor	United States	3:24:07.0
26	Gaston LeClercq	Belgium	3:27:54.0
27	Jack McKenna	Great Britain	3:30:40.0
28	Antal Lovas	Hungary	3:35:24.0
29	Mahadeo Singh	India	3:37:36.0
30	Elmar Reimann	Estonia	3:40:52.0
—	Ernesto Alciati	Italy	DNF
—	Vyron Athanasiadis	Greece	DNF
—	Belisario Villacís	Ecuador	DNF
—	Ettore Blasi	Italy	DNF
—	Cornelis Brouwer	Netherlands	DNF
—	Alberto Cavallero	Italy	DNF
—	Josef Eberle	Czechoslovakia	DNF
—	Henrik Hietakari	Finland	DNF
—	Bohumil Honzátko	Czechoslovakia	DNF
—	Ján Kalous	Czechoslovakia	DNF
—	Shizo Kanakuri	Japan	DNF
—	Pál Király	Hungary	DNF
—	Hannes Kolehmainen	Finland	DNF
—	Alexandros Kranis	Greece	DNF
—	Ville Kyrönen	Finland	DNF
—	Ernest Letherland	Great Britain	DNF
—	Angelo Malvicini	Italy	DNF
—	Bobby Mills	Great Britain	DNF
—	Yahei Miura	Japan	DNF
—	Gabriel Ruotsalainen	Finland	DNF
—	Iraklis Sakellaropoulos	Greece	DNF
—	Teunis Sprong	Netherlands	DNF
—	Gerard Steurs	Belgium	DNF
—	Kikunosuke Tashiro	Japan	DNF
—	Félicien Van De Putte	Belgium	DNF
—	Gabriel Verger	France	DNF
—	Ralph Williams	United States	DNF
—	Dunky Wright	Great Britain	DNF
—	José Andía	Spain	DNS
—	József Bese	Hungary	DNS
—	Helge Breckwoldt	Denmark	DNS
—	Josef Franz	Austria	DNS
—	János Hrenvoyszky	Hungary	DNS
—	A. Kadar	Hungary	DNS
—	Rudolf Kühnel	Austria	DNS
—	J. Polspoel dit Standaert	Belgium	DNS
—	Sofus Rose	Denmark	DNS
—	Trygve Tangen	Norway	DNS
—	R. Uri	Austria	DNS
—	B. Zapletal	Czechoslovakia	DNS
—	František Zyka	Czechoslovakia	DNS
