= Silas McLellan =

Canadian marathon runner

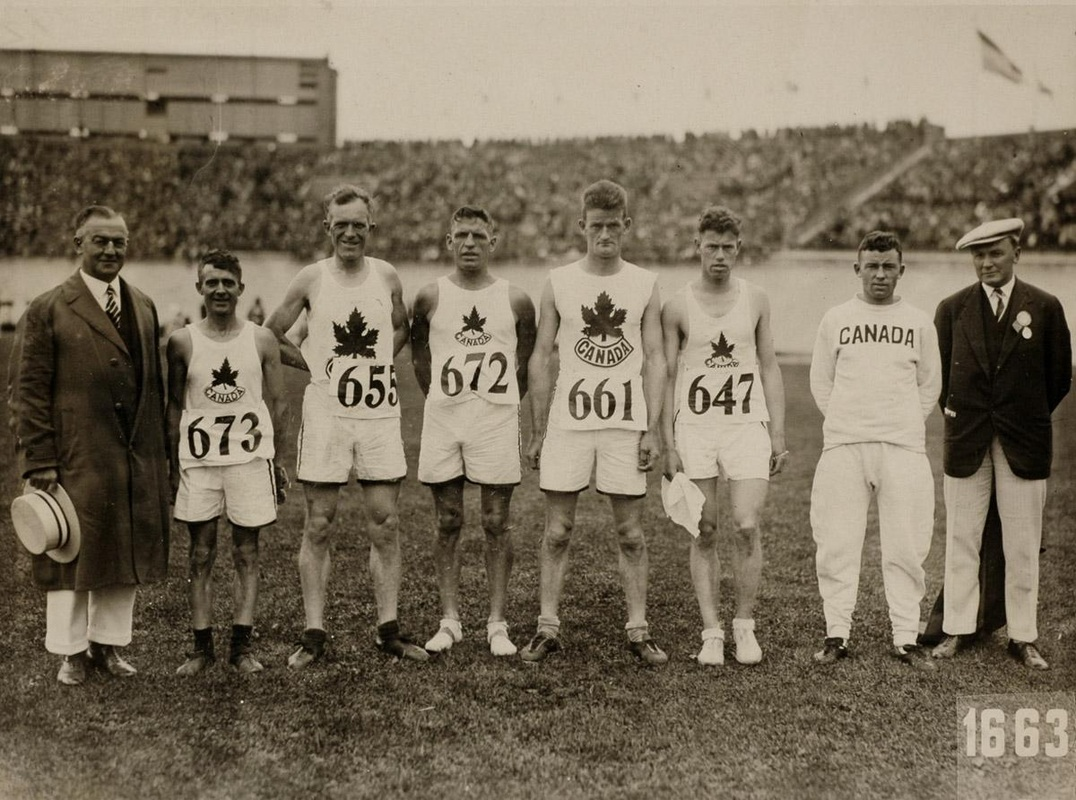
- Silas McLellan (#661) Olympics 1928, NS Sport Hall Of Fame

Personal information
- Born: March 17, 1897: March 17, 1897 Noel, Nova Scotia
- Died: February 10, 1974 (aged 76) Noel, Nova Scotia

Achievements and titles
- Olympic finals: 1928 Summer Olympics; 1932 Summer Olympics

Silas Dennison McLellan, CM (17 March 1897 – 10 February 1974) was a Canadian marathon runner. He won the Halifax Marathon five times as well as competing in the Boston marathon, the 1928 Summer Olympics and the British Empire Games.

Military Service

Silas was drafted on the 11th of June 1918 at Camp Aldershot. He joined the 1st Depot Battalion Nova Scotia Regiment. He arrived in Liverpool on the 16th of August 1918 with the 17th reserve battalion. He remained in the United Kingdom until June 1919 when he returned to Canada and was discharged on the 5th of July 1919 in Halifax, Nova Scotia.

Silas trained under Victor MacAuley. Silas competed in the 1928 Olympics and beat Clarence DeMar, five-time winner of the Boston Marathon. Two years later Silas won the 1930 Halifax Marathon. In the same year, Silas McLellan finished sixth in the 1930 British Empire Games marathon. McLellan also finished 9th in the Boston Marathon 19 Apr 1930. He was inducted into the Nova Scotia Sport Hall of Fame. McLellan died at age 76 in Noel, Nova Scotia.
