= Verger (surname) =

People with the surname Verger:

- Charles Paumier du Verger (fl. 1900–1908), Belgian sports shooter
- François Verger (1911–2001), French field hockey player
- Frédéric Verger (born 1959), French writer
- Georges Verger (fl. 1896–1924), French long-distance runner who competed in the 1924 Olympics
- Giovanni Battista Verger (1796 – after 1844), Italian operatic tenor and impresario
- Joanne Verger (21st century), American politician
- Jean-Louis Verger (1826–1857), French priest, assassin of Archbishop Marie-Dominique-Auguste Sibour
- Maria Verger (1892–1983), Spanish archivist, librarian, and poet
- Pierre Edouard Leopold Verger (1902–1996), French photographer
- Virginie Morel du Verger (Christiane) (1779–1870), French pianist, music teacher, and composer.

== Fictional characters ==
- Mason Verger, main antagonist of the novel Hannibal

== See also ==
- Esther Vergeer (born 1981), Dutch wheelchair tennis player
- Vergier
