= Francisco Solé =

Francisco Solé may refer to:

- Francisco Solé (footballer) (born 1997), Argentine footballer
- Francisco Solé (wrestler) (1900–?), Spanish wrestler
