= Keemink =

Keemink is a Dutch surname. Notable people with the surname include:

- Henk Keemink (1902–1985), Dutch racewalker
- Wessel Keemink (born 1993), Dutch volleyball player
