= Matura (surname) =

Matura is a surname. Notable people with the surname include:

- Jan Matura (born 1980), Czech Nordic skier
- Mihály Matura (1900–1975), Hungarian wrestler
- Mustapha Matura (1939–2019), Trinidadian playwright
