= 1924 USA Outdoor Track and Field Championships =

American athletics championship event

- Dates: 5–7 September (men); 20 September (women)
- Host city: West Orange, New Jersey (men); Pittsburgh, Pennsylvania (women)
- Venue: Colgate Field (men); Forbes Field (women)
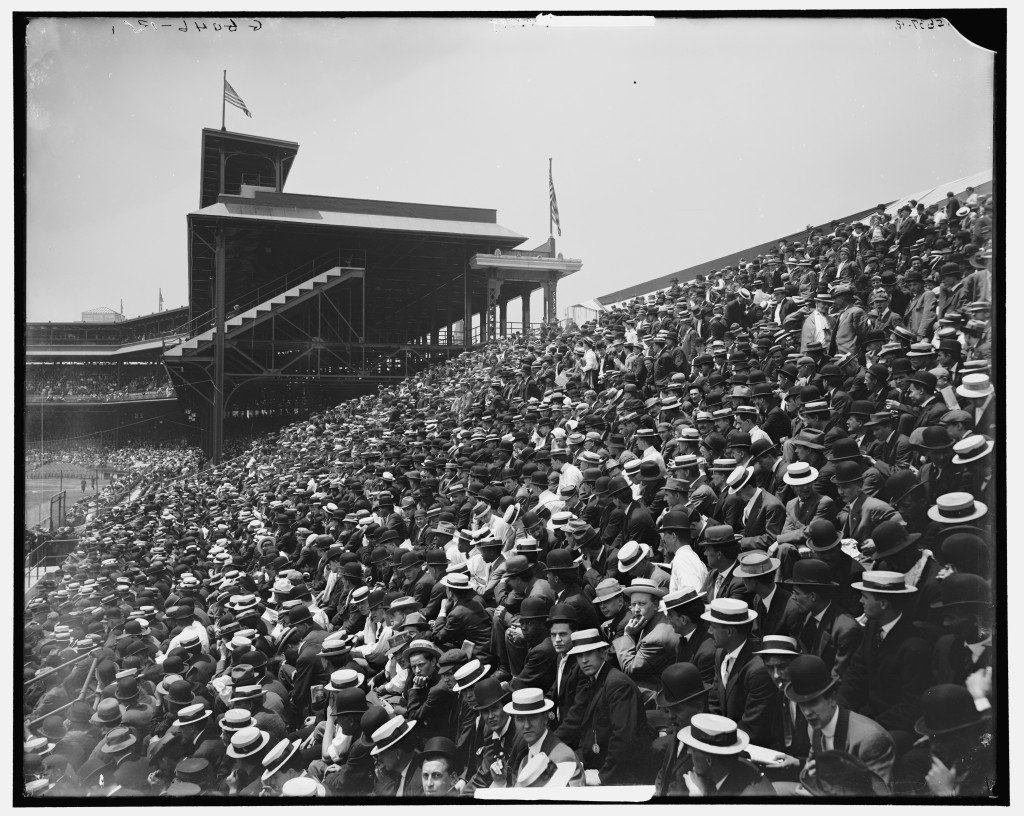

The 1924 USA Outdoor Track and Field Championships were organized by the Amateur Athletic Union (AAU) and served as the national championships in outdoor track and field for the United States.

The men's edition was held at Colgate Field, Newark Athletic Country Club in West Orange, New Jersey, and it took place 5–7 September. The women's meet was held separately at Forbes Field in Pittsburgh, Pennsylvania, on 20 September.

The meeting was separate from the 1924 United States Olympic trials, which were held earlier on 13–14 June in Massachusetts. At the men's championships, meet records were broken in the high jump, pole vault, discus and javelin. In the women's competition, Frances Ruppert repeated as 100 yards champion.

== Results ==
=== Men ===
Event	Gold		Silver		Bronze	
100 yards	Charles Paddock	9.6	Loren Murchison	inches behind	Alfred Leconey	poor 3rd
220 yards straight	Charles Paddock	20.8S	Loren Murchison	4 yards behind	Cyril Coaffee (CAN)	3 yards behind3
440 yards	James Burgess	49.8	George Stevenson		Clifford Stowers	
880 yards	Edward Kirby	1:58.9	Ray Dodge		Ray Watson	
1 mile	Ray Buker	4:24.8	Edward Kirby	2 yards behind	William Goodwin	7 yards behind 2nd
5 miles	Ilmar Prem (FIN)	26:20.4	George Lermond		Verne Booth	
120 yards hurdles	Ivan Riley	15.4	Harrison Thompson		Herbert Meyer	
440 yards hurdles	F. Morgan Taylor	54.5	Richard Oram		John Gibson	
2 miles steeplechase	Marvin Rick	10:43.2	Russell Payne	1 yard behind	Fred Yater	
High jump	Robert Juday	1.93 m	LeRoy Brown	1.90 m	Richmond Landon	1.88 m
Pole vault	Edwin Myers	3.96 m	Benjamin Owen	3.81* m	Sylvan Schlopp	3.81* m
Long jump	William DeHart Hubbard	7.31 m	Edward Gourdin	7.19 m	William Dowding	6.84 m
Triple jump	Homer Martin	13.94 m	Albert Rogan	13.35 m	Paul Courtois	13.34 m
Shot put	Ralph Hills	14.17 m	Augustus Pope	13.59 m	Orville Wanzer	13.47 m
Discus throw	Thomas Lieb	44.07 m	Augustus Pope	42.43 m	Charles Ashton	41.72 m
Hammer throw	Fredrick Tootell	53.02 m	Matthew McGrath	49.13 m	George Lansing Taylor	42.52 m
Javelin throw	John Leyden	55.17 m	Frederick Schildhauer	51.66 m	Ralph Greenidge	50.95 m
Decathlon	Anthony Plansky	5901.45 pts	Charles Rogers	5666.48 pts	Donald Foote	5653.07 pts
220 yards hurdles	Herbert Meyer	24.3				
Pentathlon	Anthony Woostroff	7 pts				
Weight throw for distance	Matt McGrath	10.84 m				

=== Women ===
Event	Gold		Silver	Bronze
50 yards	Christine Pylick	6.2	Grace Rittler	Christine Joseph
100 yards	Frances Ruppert	12.0	Christine Pylick	Marietta Ceres
80 yards hurdles	Hazel Kirk	9.0	Clara Farley	Esther Behring
Long jump	Dorothy Walsh	4.65 m	Marietta Ceres	Nanette Dowling
Shot put (8 lb)	Esther Behring	9.18 m	Gladys Booth	Bertha Christophel
Discus throw	Roberta Ranck	21.33 m	Minnie Wolbert	Catherine Donovan
Javelin throw	Ester Spargo	22.09 m	Roberta Ranck	Catherine Donovan
Baseball throw	Mabel Holmes	199 ft 10 in (60.9 m)		

== See also ==
- 1924 USA Indoor Track and Field Championships
- List of USA Outdoor Track and Field Championships winners (men)
- List of USA Outdoor Track and Field Championships winners (women)
