= Kikunosuke Tashiro =

Japanese athlete

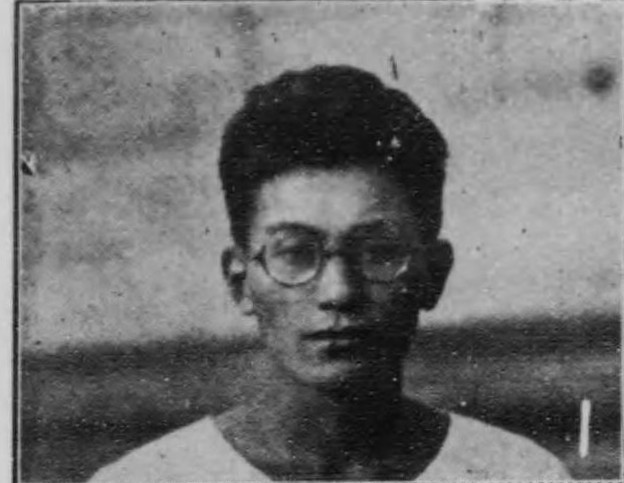

Personal information
- Nationality: Japanese
- Born: 11 October 1896
- Died: 4 December 1953 (aged 57)

Sport
- Sport: Long-distance running
- Event: Marathon

Kikunosuke Tashiro (田代菊之助, Tashiro Kikunosuke; 11 October 1896 – 4 December 1953) was a Japanese long-distance runner. He competed in the marathon at the 1924 Summer Olympics.
