= Mihály Fekete (athlete) =

Hungarian racewalker

Personal information
- Nationality: Hungarian
- Born: 1 November 1894
- Died: 15 July 1991 (aged 96)

Sport
- Sport: Athletics
- Event: Racewalking

Mihály Fekete (1 November 1894 – 15 July 1991) was a Hungarian racewalker. He competed in the men's 10 kilometres walk at the 1924 Summer Olympics.
