= François Decrombecque =

French racewalker

Personal information
- Nationality: French
- Born: 4 December 1884
- Died: 7 August 1960 (aged 75)

Sport
- Sport: Athletics
- Event: Racewalking

François Decrombecque (4 December 1884 – 7 August 1960) was a French racewalker. He competed in the men's 10 kilometres walk at the 1924 Summer Olympics.
