= Victor MacAuley =

Canadian long-distance runner

Personal information
- Born: November 3, 1889 Windsor, Nova Scotia, Canada
- Died: July 24, 1968 (aged 78) Windsor, Nova Scotia, Canada

Sport
- Sport: Long-distance running
- Event: Marathon

Victor MacAuley (November 3, 1889 – July 24, 1968) was a Canadian long-distance runner. He competed in the marathon at the 1924 Summer Olympics. McAuley was a five-time winner of the Halifax Marathon. McAuley ran in the 1924 Paris Olympics and finished in 14th place. He later coached Silas McLellan.
