= Englebert Mollin =

Belgian wrestler

- Born: 5 July 1904; Antwerp, Belgium
- Died: May 1945 (aged 40); Theresienstadt Ghetto, Czechoslovakia

Englebert Mollin (5 July 1904 – May 1945) was a Belgian wrestler. He competed in the Greco-Roman lightweight event at the 1924 Summer Olympics. He also won a silver medal at the 1930 European Wrestling Championships, and died in the Theresienstadt Ghetto during World War II.
