= Lauri Halonen =

Finnish long-distance runner

Personal information
- Nationality: Finnish
- Born: 24 March 1894 Vaasa, Grand Duchy of Finland
- Died: 27 May 1961 (aged 67) Helsinki, Finland

Sport
- Sport: Long-distance running
- Event: Marathon

Lauri Halonen (24 March 1894 – 27 May 1961) was a Finnish long-distance runner. He competed in the marathon at the 1924 Summer Olympics.
