= Dionisio Carreras =

Spanish long-distance runner

Personal information
- Nationality: Spanish
- Born: 9 October 1890 Codo, Spain
- Died: 16 July 1949 (aged 58) Codo, Spain

Sport
- Sport: Long-distance running
- Event: Marathon
- Club: Zaragoza Foot-Ball Club, Zaragoza Club Deportivo

Dionisio Carreras (9 October 1890 – 16 July 1949) was a Spanish long-distance runner. He competed in the marathon at the 1924 Summer Olympics.
