= Cecil McMaster =

South African racewalker

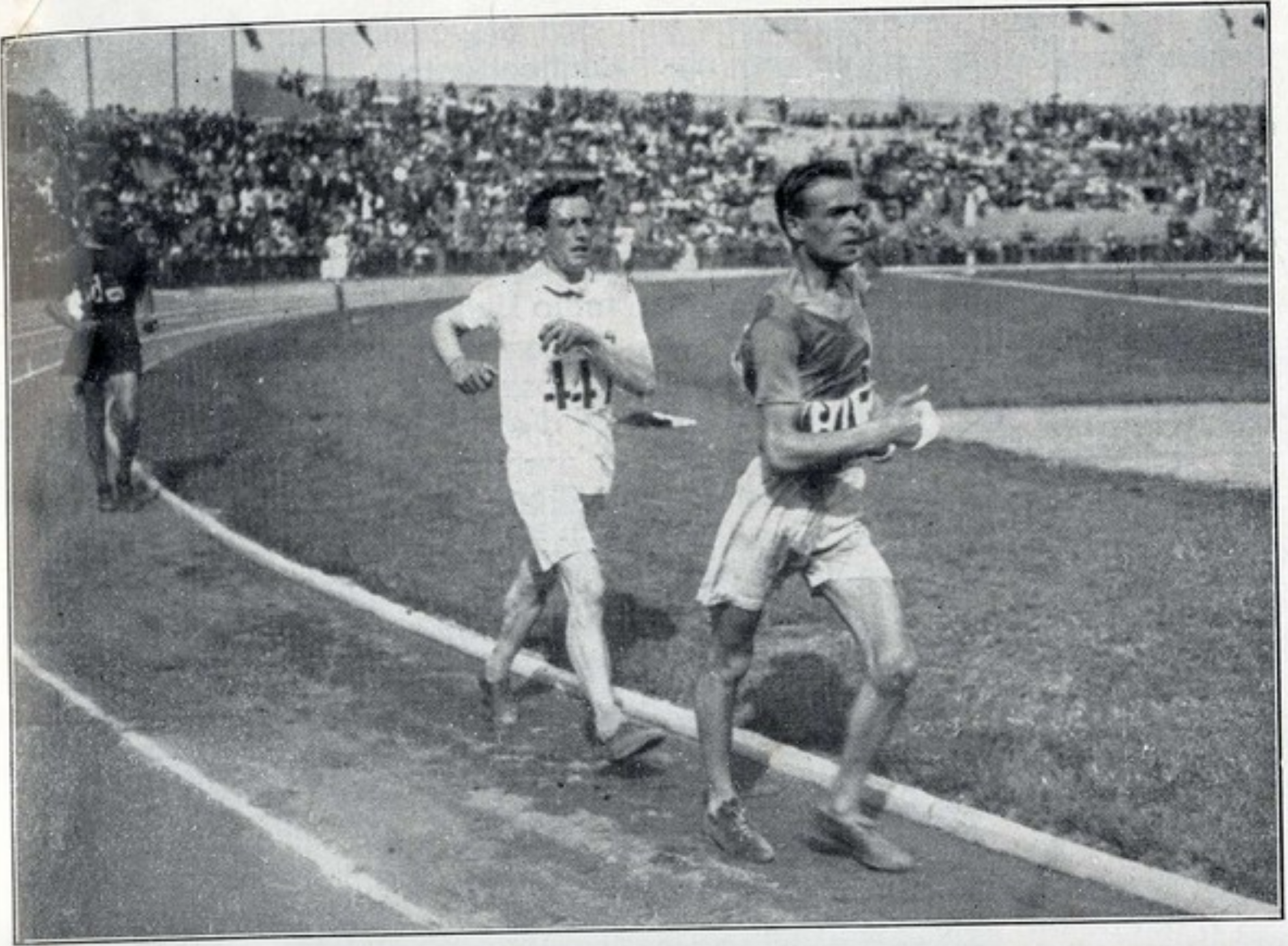
- Ugo Frigerio precedes Gordon Goodwin and Cecil McMaster in the 10 km walk at the 1924 Paris Olympic Games

Personal information
- Full name: Cecil Charles McMaster
- Born: 5 June 1895 Port Elizabeth, South Africa
- Died: 11 September 1981 (aged 86) Germiston, South Africa

Achievements and titles
- Personal best: 10 km walk – 45:04.6 (1924)
Medal record
Men's athletics
Representing South Africa
Olympic Games
Bronze medal – third place	1924 Paris	10 kilometre walk

Cecil Charles McMaster (5 June 1895 – 11 September 1981) was a South African athlete, who competed in two consecutive Summer Olympics for his native country, starting in 1920. He won the bronze medal at the 1924 Summer Olympics held in Paris, France in the 10 kilometre walk. He was born in Port Elizabeth.
