= Armando Valente =

Italian racewalker (1903–1997)

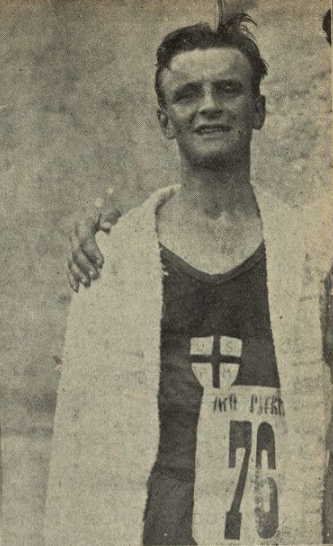
- Armando Valente

Personal information
- Nationality: Italian
- Born: January 12, 1903 Sampierdarena, Italy
- Died: 7 December 1997 (aged 94) Genoa, Italy
- Height: 1.70 m (5 ft 7 in)
- Weight: 68 kg (150 lb)

Sport
- Country: Italy
- Sport: Athletics
- Event: Race walk
- Club: G. S. Nafta, Genova

Achievements and titles
- Personal best: 10 km walk. 45:57.0 (1926)

Armando Valente (January 12, 1903 – December 7, 1997) was an Italian track and field athlete.

== Biography ==
Valente was born in Sampierdarena and died in Genoa. He competed in racewalking at the 1924 Summer Olympics. In 1924 he finished seventh in the 10 km competition at the Paris Games.

== Achievements ==
Year	Competition	Venue	Position	Event	Performance	Note
1924	Olympic Games	(France) Paris	7th	10 km walk	50:07.0	

== National championships ==
He has won 5 times the individual national championship.

- 5 wins in the 10000 m walk (1922, 1926, 1927, 1928, 1929)

== See also ==
- Italy at the 1924 Summer Olympics
