= Sidney Bergmann =

Austrian wrestler (born 1905)

- Born: 1905

Sidney Bergmann (born 1905, date of death unknown) was an Austrian wrestler. He competed in the Greco-Roman lightweight event at the 1924 Summer Olympics.
