= Angelo Malvicini =

Italian long-distance runner

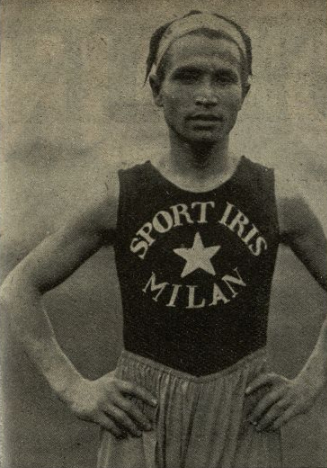
- Malvicini in 1920

Personal information
- Nationality: Italian
- Born: 1 May 1895 Castelleone, Italy
- Died: 29 December 1949 (aged 54)

Sport
- Sport: Long-distance running
- Event: Marathon

Angelo Malvicini (1 May 1895 – 29 December 1949) was an Italian long-distance runner. He competed in the marathon at the 1924 Summer Olympics.

Malvicini also won two individual national championships, with two wins in the marathon (1913, 1922).

== See also ==
- Italy at the 1924 Summer Olympics
