= Gabriel Ruotsalainen =

Finnish long-distance runner (1893–1966)

Personal information
- Nationality: Finnish
- Born: 13 March 1893 Helsinki, Finland
- Died: 27 June 1966 (aged 73)

Sport
- Sport: Long-distance running
- Event: Marathon

Gabriel Ruotsalainen (13 March 1893 – 27 June 1966) was a Finnish long-distance runner. He competed in the marathon at the 1924 Summer Olympics.
