= Josef Eberle =

Czech long-distance runner

Personal information
- Nationality: Czechoslovak
- Born: 1901

Sport
- Sport: Long-distance running
- Event: Marathon

Josef Eberle (born 1901, date of death unknown) was a Czechoslovak long-distance runner. He competed in the marathon at the 1924 Summer Olympics.
