= Félicien Van De Putte =

Belgian long-distance runner

Personal information
- Nationality: Belgian
- Born: 1898

Sport
- Sport: Long-distance running
- Event: Marathon

Félicien Van De Putte (born 1898, date of death unknown) was a Belgian long-distance runner. He competed in the marathon at the 1924 Summer Olympics.
