= Gaston LeClercq =

Belgian long-distance runner

Personal information
- Nationality: Belgian
- Born: c. 1904
- Died: June 1944

Sport
- Sport: Long-distance running
- Event: Marathon

Gaston LeClercq (c. 1904 – June 1944) was a Belgian long-distance runner. He competed in the marathon at the 1924 Summer Olympics.
