= Jack McKenna (runner) =

British athlete

Personal information
- Nationality: British
- Born: 14 April 1889 Birmingham, England
- Died: 4 December 1973 (aged 84) Birmingham, England

Sport
- Sport: Long-distance running
- Event: Marathon

Jack McKenna (14 April 1889 – 4 December 1973) was a British long-distance runner. He competed in the marathon at the 1924 Summer Olympics.
