= Alberto Cavallero =

Italian long-distance runner

Personal information
- Nationality: Italian
- Born: 14 September 1900 Spigno Monferrato, Italy
- Died: 7 October 1968 (aged 68) Spigno Monferrato, Italy

Sport
- Country: Italy
- Sport: Athletics
- Event: Marathon
- Club: Libero Sport Savona

Achievements and titles
- Personal best: Marathon: 2:58:22 (1923)

Alberto Cavallero (14 September 1900 – 7 October 1968) was an Italian long-distance runner.

== Biography ==
He competed in the marathon at the 1924 Summer Olympics, but he did not finish the race. He had one cap for the national team in 1924. In his native city, Genoa, is sailed a race named after him.

== See also ==
- Italy at the 1924 Summer Olympics
