= Luigi Bosatra =

Italian racewalker

Personal information
- Nationality: Italian
- Born: 8 August 1905 Milan, Italy
- Died: 16 February 1981 (aged 75) Abbiategrasso, Italy

Sport
- Country: Italy
- Sport: Athletics
- Event: Race walk

Achievements and titles
- Personal best: 10 km walk. 48:05.6 (1926)

Luigi Bosatra (8 August 1905 – 16 February 1981) was an Italian athlete who competed in racewalking in the 1924 Summer Olympics.

== Biography ==
In 1924 he finished eighth in the 10 km competition at the Paris Games.

== Achievements ==
Year	Competition	Venue	Position	Event	Performance	Note
1924	Olympic Games	(France) Paris	8th	10 km walk	50:09.0	

== See also ==
- Italy at the 1924 Summer Olympics
