= Jan Plichta =

Czech racewalker

Personal information
- Full name: Jan Evangelista Plichta
- Nationality: Czech
- Born: 13 September 1891 Prague, Austria-Hungary
- Died: 31 January 1975 (aged 83) Prague, Czechoslovakia

Sport
- Sport: Athletics
- Event: Racewalking

Jan Evangelista Plichta (13 September 1891 – 31 January 1975) was a Czechoslovak racewalker. He competed in the men's 10 kilometres walk at the 1924 Summer Olympics.
