= Henri Clermont =

French racewalker

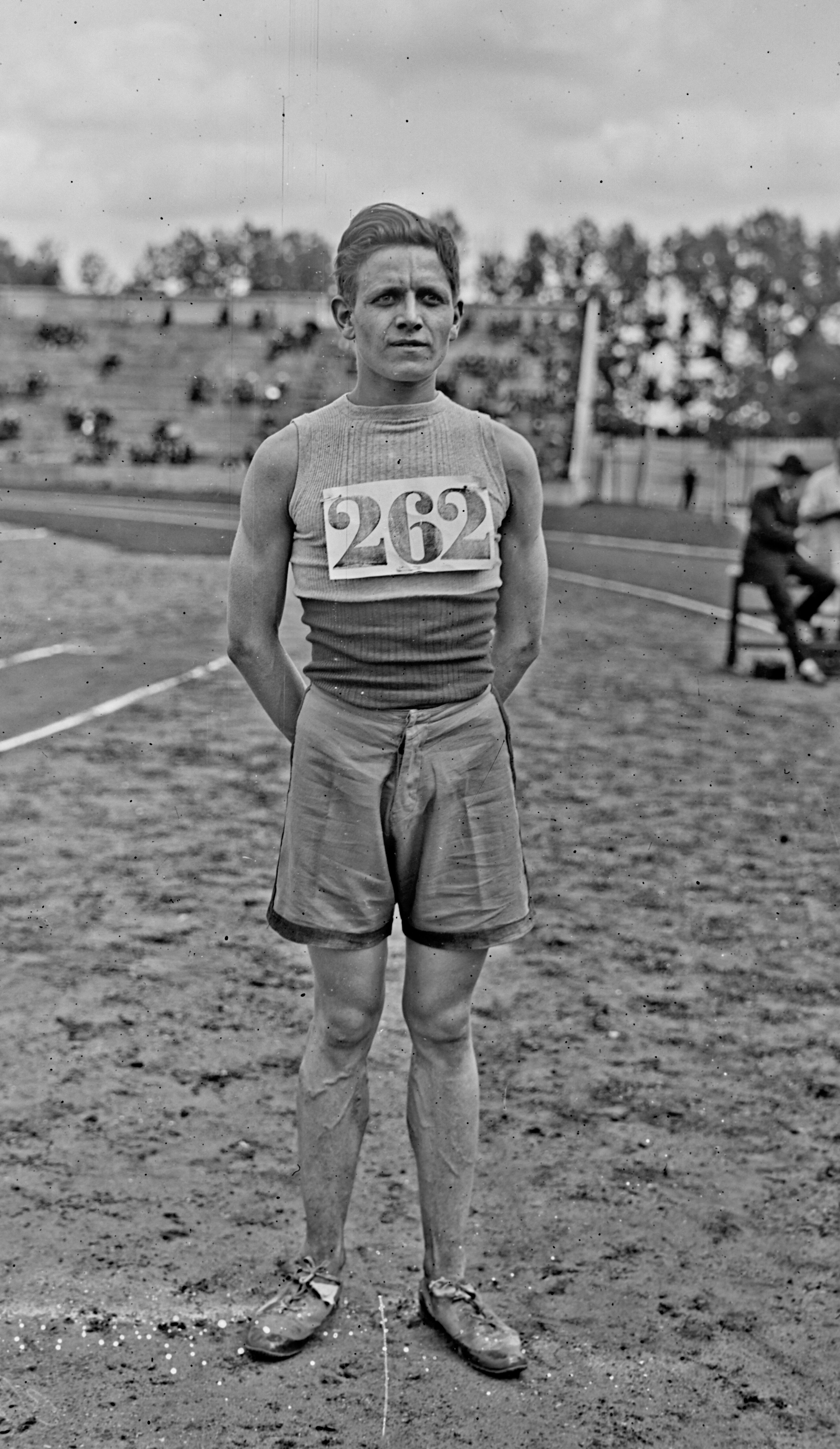
- Clermont in 1924

Personal information
- Nationality: French
- Born: 15 December 1901
- Died: 25 September 1969 (aged 67)

Sport
- Sport: Athletics
- Event: Racewalking
- Club: Marcheurs Français

Achievements and titles
- Personal best: 10 km walk: 49:58.2 (1924)

Henri Clermont (15 December 1901 – 25 September 1969) was a French racewalker. He competed in the 10 km walk at the 1924 Summer Olympics.
