= Louis Christoffel =

Belgian wrestler

Pierre Christoffel
- Full name: Pierre François Catherine Christoffel
- Born: 28 May 1886; Brussels, Belgium
- Died: Unknown

Pierre Christoffel (born 28 May 1886, date of death unknown) was a Belgian wrestler. He competed in the Greco-Roman lightweight event at the 1924 Summer Olympics.
