= Waldemar Karlsson =

Swedish long-distance runner

Personal information
- Nationality: Swedish
- Born: Henning Waldemar Karlsson; 20 May 1897 Stockholm, Sweden
- Died: 21 May 1978 (aged 81) Hallstavik, Sweden

Sport
- Sport: Long-distance running
- Event: Marathon

Henning Waldemar Karlsson (20 May 1897 – 21 May 1978) was a Swedish long-distance runner. He competed in the marathon at the 1924 Summer Olympics.
