= Rūdolfs Ronis =

Latvian wrestler (1897–1970)

- Born: 7 March 1897; Puka, Kreis Dorpat, Governorate of Livonia, Russian Empire
- Died: 30 March 1970 (aged 73); Riga, Latvian SSR, Soviet Union

Rūdolfs Ronis (7 March 1897 – 30 March 1970) was a Latvian wrestler. He competed in the Greco-Roman lightweight event at the 1924 Summer Olympics.
