= Ernest Letherland =

British long-distance runner

Personal information
- Nationality: British
- Born: 23 June 1894 Bulwell, Nottingham, England
- Died: 12 April 1947 (aged 52) Mansfield, England

Sport
- Sport: Long-distance running
- Event: Marathon

Ernest Letherland (23 June 1894 – 12 April 1947) was a British long-distance runner. He competed in the marathon at the 1924 Summer Olympics.
