= Alfrēds Ruks =

Latvian athlete

Personal information
- Nationality: Russian, Latvian
- Born: 27 October 1890
- Died: 30 November 1941 (aged 51)

Sport
- Sport: Middle-distance running
- Event: 1500 metres

Alfrēds Ruks (27 October 1890 – 30 November 1941) was a Latvian middle-distance runner. He competed in the men's 1500 metres at the 1912 Summer Olympics, representing the Russian Empire and the men's 10 kilometres walk at the 1924 Summer Olympics, representing Latvia.

He was executed in a Soviet prison camp during World War II.
