= Leon Rękawek =

Polish wrestler

- Born: 3 April 1905

Leon Rękawek (born 3 April 1905, date of death unknown) was a Polish wrestler. He competed in the Greco-Roman lightweight event at the 1924 Summer Olympics.
