= Gastone Baldi =

Italian footballer

Personal information
- Date of birth: 14 May 1901
- Place of birth: Bologna, Kingdom of Italy
- Date of death: 18 June 1971 (aged 70)
- Place of death: Bologna, Italy
- Position: Midfielder

Senior career*
Years	Team	Apps	(Gls)
1919–1920	Bolognese		
1920–1933	Bologna	272	(14)

International career
1922–1925	Italy	3	(0)
- * Club domestic league appearances and goals

Gastone Baldi (Italian pronunciation: [ɡaˈstoːne ˈbaldi]; born 14 May 1901 – 18 June 1971) was an Italian footballer who played as a midfielder.

== Career ==
Baldi played for 4 seasons (82 games, 3 goals) in the Italian Serie A with Bologna F.C. 1909. Baldi made his debut for the Italy national football team on 3 December 1922 in a game against Switzerland. He represented Italy at the 1924 Summer Olympics.
