= Athletics at the 1924 Summer Olympics – Men's 10 kilometres walk =

Men's 10 kilometres walk at the Games of the VIII Olympiad
- Venue: Stade Olympique Yves-du-Manoir
- Dates: July 9 & 11, 1924 (semifinals); July 13, 1924 (final)
- Competitors: 25 from 13 nations

Medalists
1st place, gold medalist(s)		Ugo Frigerio; Italy
2nd place, silver medalist(s)		Gordon Goodwin; Great Britain
3rd place, bronze medalist(s)		Cecil McMaster; South Africa

The men's 10 kilometres walk event was part of the track and field athletics programme at the 1924 Summer Olympics. It was the only racewalking event at this Games. After 1924, the 10 kilometre walk would not be held again until 1948. The competition was held from Wednesday, July 9, 1924, to Sunday, July 13, 1924. The races were held on the track which was as for all other events of 500 metres in circumference. Twenty-five race walkers from 13 nations competed.

== Records ==
These were the standing world and Olympic records (in minutes) prior to the 1924 Summer Olympics.

World record	45:26.4	(Denmark) Aage Rasmussen	?	1918
Olympic record	46:28.4	(Canada) George Goulding	Stockholm (SWE)	August 11, 1912

== Results ==
=== Semifinals ===
The first semi-final was held on Wednesday, July 9, 1924. The best five finishers qualified for the final.

Semifinal 1

Place	Athlete	Time	Qual.
1	Gordon Goodwin (GBR)	49:04.0	Q
2	Donato Pavesi (ITA)	49:09.0	Q
3	Harry Hinkel (USA)		Q
4	Luigi Bosatra (ITA)		Q
5	Henri Clermont (FRA)		Q
—	Edward Freeman (CAN)	DSQ	
—	Ernie Austen (AUS)	DSQ	
—	Henk Keemink (NED)	DSQ	
—	Arvīds Ķibilds (LAT)	DSQ	
—	Alfrēds Ruks (LAT)	DSQ	
—	Daniel Eslava (MEX)	DSQ	
—	Rudolf Kühnel (AUT)	DSQ	

Semifinal 2

The second semi-final was held on Friday, July 11, 1924. After a protest against his disqualification Rudolf Kühnel was allowed to start also in this race - he was disqualified again. The best five finishers qualified for the final.

Place	Athlete	Time	Qual.
1	Ugo Frigerio (ITA)	49:15.6	Q
2	Cecil McMaster (RSA)		Q
3	Arthur Tell Schwab (SUI)		Q
4	Armando Valente (ITA)		Q
5	Ernest Clark (GBR)		Q
—	François Decrombecque (FRA)	DSQ	
—	Alfrēds Kalniņš (LAT)	DSQ	
—	Philip Granville (CAN)	DSQ	
—	Charles Foster (USA)	DSQ	
—	Gordon Watts (GBR)	DSQ	
—	Mihály Fekete (HUN)	DSQ	
—	Rudolf Kühnel (AUT)	DSQ	
—	Jan Plichta (TCH)	DSQ	

=== Final ===
The final was held on Sunday, July 13, 1924.

Place	Athlete	Time
1	Ugo Frigerio (ITA)	47:49.0
2	Gordon Goodwin (GBR)	48:37.9
3	Cecil McMaster (RSA)	49:08.0
4	Donato Pavesi (ITA)	49:17.0
5	Arthur Tell Schwab (SUI)	49:50.0
6	Ernest Clark (GBR)	49:59.2
7	Armando Valente (ITA)	50:07.0
8	Luigi Bosatra (ITA)	50:09.0
9	Harry Hinkel (USA)	50:16.8
10	Henri Clermont (FRA)	51:41.6
