= Gordon Goodwin (athlete) =

British racewalker (1895–1984)

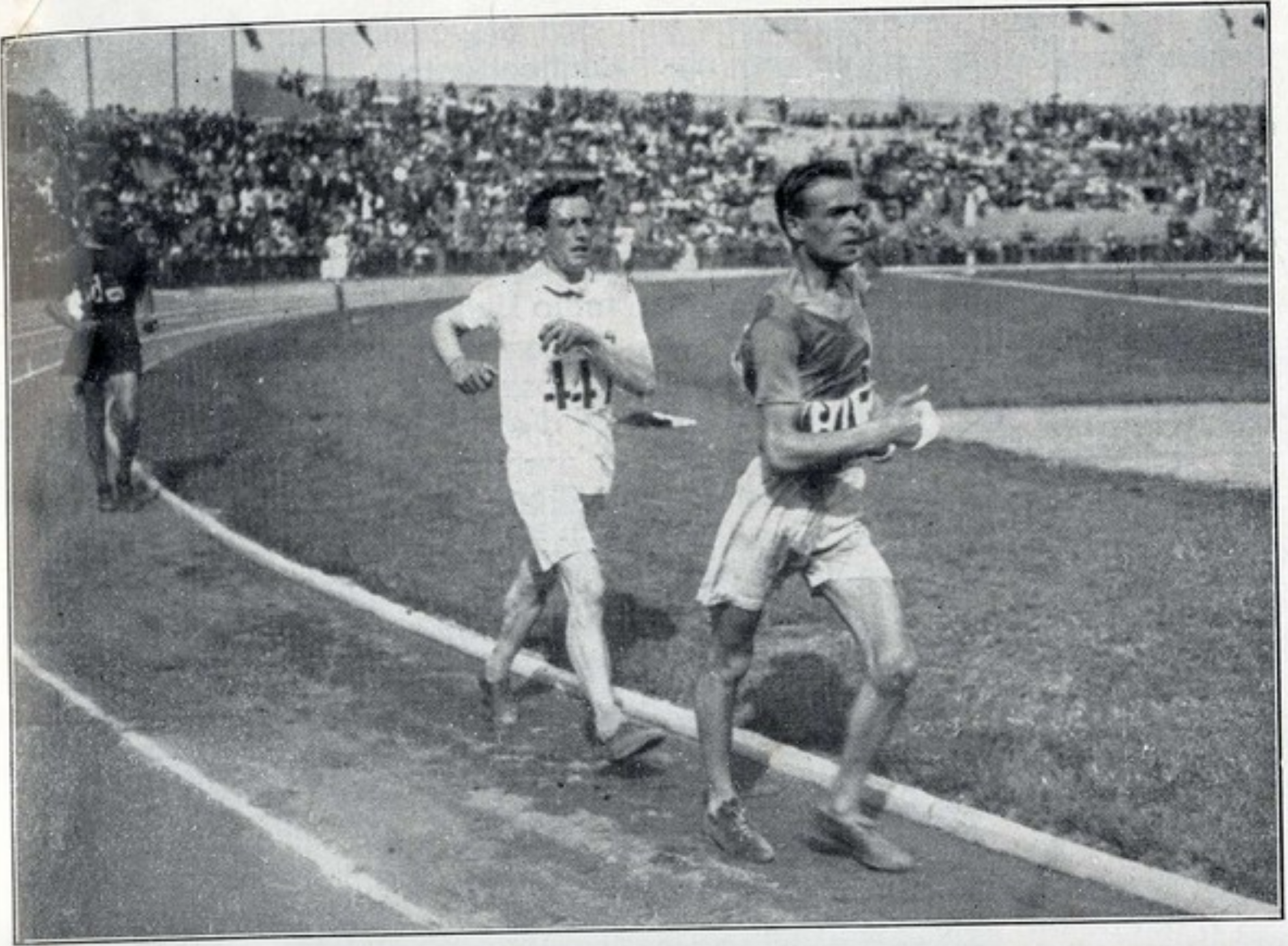
- Ugo Frigerio leading Gordon Goodwin, 1924

Personal information
- Born: 17 December 1895 Lambeth, London, England
- Died: 14 February 1984 (aged 88) Leigh, Greater Manchester, England

Sport
- Sport: Racewalker
Medal record
Olympic Games
Men's athletics
Representing United Kingdom
Silver medal – second place	1924 Paris	10 kilometre walk

Gordon Reginald Goodwin (17 December 1895 – February 1984) was a British athlete who competed mainly in the 10 kilometre walk. He competed for Great Britain in the 1924 Summer Olympics held in Paris, France, in the 10 kilometre walk where he won the silver medal. He was born in Lambeth in London and died in Leigh, Greater Manchester.
