= Henrik Hietakari =

Finnish long-distance runner (1894–1946)

Personal information
- Nationality: Finnish
- Born: 6 April 1894 Lappeenranta, Viipuri Province, Grand Duchy of Finland
- Died: 31 August 1946 (aged 52) Joensuu, Finland

Sport
- Sport: Long-distance running
- Event: Marathon

Henrik Hietakari (6 April 1894 – 31 August 1946) was a Finnish long-distance runner. He competed in the marathon at the 1924 Summer Olympics.
