= Charles Foster (race walker) =

American racewalker

Personal information
- Full name: Charles Hines Foster
- Nationality: American
- Born: 23 December 1893 Port Colborne, Ontario, Canada
- Died: 17 December 1943 (aged 49)

Sport
- Sport: Athletics
- Event: Racewalking
- Club: Detroit YMCA

Charles Hines Foster (December 23, 1893 – December 17, 1943) was an American racewalker. He competed in the men's 10 kilometres walk at the 1924 Summer Olympics.
