= Mohammed Ghermati =

French long-distance runner

Personal information
- Nationality: French
- Born: 23 January 1897 Oran, French Algeria

Sport
- Sport: Long-distance running
- Event: Marathon

Mohammed Ghermati (born 23 January 1897, date of death unknown) was a French long-distance runner. He competed in the marathon at the 1924 Summer Olympics.
