= Alfrēds Kalniņš (athlete) =

Latvian racewalker

Personal information
- Nationality: Latvian
- Born: 30 August 1894
- Died: 4 May 1960 (aged 65)

Sport
- Sport: Athletics
- Event: Racewalking

Alfrēds Kalniņš (30 August 1894 – 4 May 1960) was a Latvian racewalker. He competed in the men's 10 kilometres walk at the 1924 Summer Olympics.
