= Holger Askehave =

Danish wrestler and Olympian (1900–1978)

- Born: 4 September 1900; Aarhus, Denmark
- Died: 16 December 1978 (aged 78); Nordjylland, Denmark

Holger Askehave (4 September 1900 – 16 December 1978) was a Danish wrestler. He competed in the Greco-Roman lightweight event at the 1924 Summer Olympics.
