= Cornelis Brouwer (athlete) =

Dutch long-distance runner

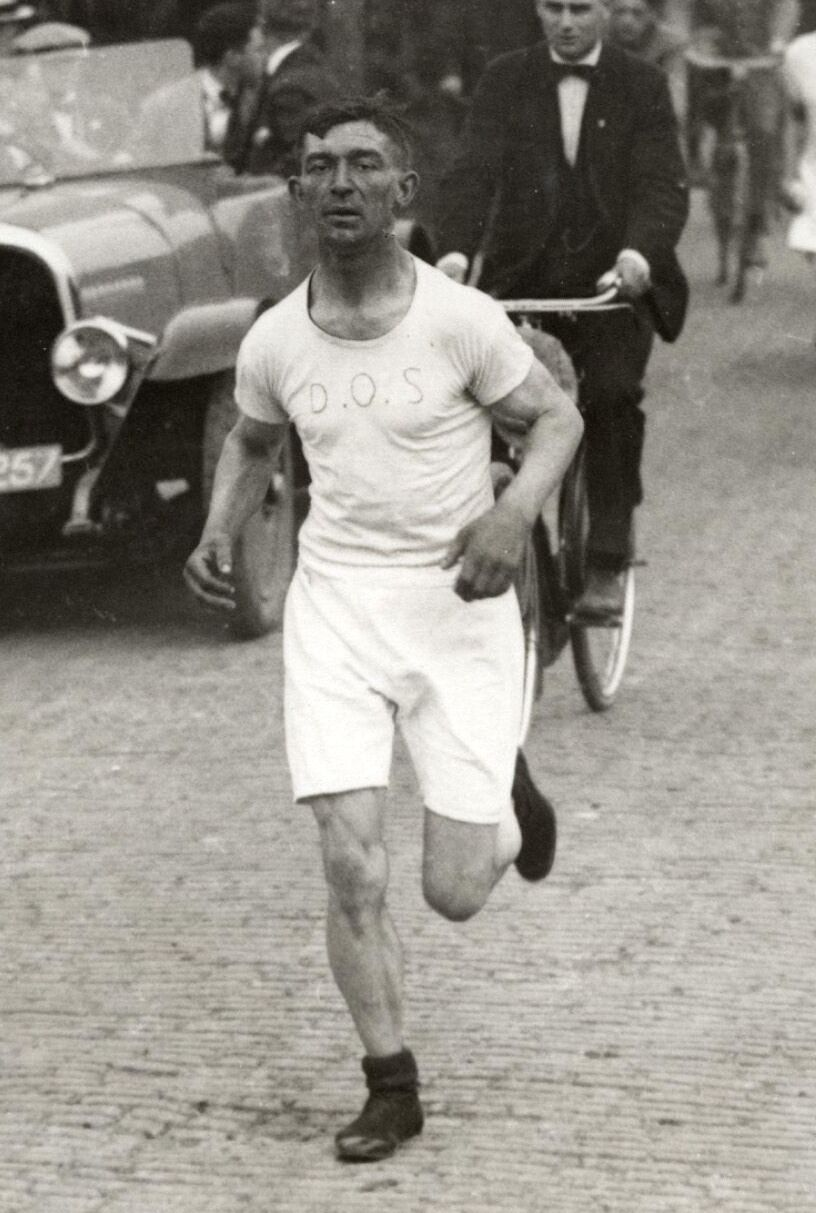
- Bertus Brouwer in 1924

Personal information
- Nationality: Dutch
- Born: 27 November 1900 Rotterdam, Netherlands
- Died: 7 May 1952 (aged 51) Rotterdam, Netherlands

Sport
- Sport: Long-distance running
- Event: Marathon

Cornelis Brouwer (27 November 1900 – 7 May 1952) was a Dutch long-distance runner. He competed in the marathon at the 1924 Summer Olympics.
