= Ettore Blasi =

Italian long-distance runner

Personal information
- Nationality: Italian
- Born: 16 March 1895 Rome, Italy
- Died: Brazil

Sport
- Sport: Athletics
- Event: Marathon
- Club: Fortitudo Roma

Achievements and titles
- Personal best: Marathon: 2:53:21 (1923)

Ettore Blasi (born 16 March 1895, date of death unknown) was an Italian long-distance runner, mainly specialized in marathon.

== Biography ==
Blasi participated at two editions of the Summer Olympics (1920, 1924), which were his only two caps with national team.

== Olympic participation ==
Year	Competition	Venue	Position	Event	Performance	Note
1924	Olympic Games	(France) Paris	DNF	Marathon	-	
1928	Olympic Games	(Netherlands) Amsterdam	DNF	Marathon	-	

== National titles ==
Blasi won five individual national championship titles.

- 4 wins in the half marathon (1919, 1920, 1921, 1922)
- 1 win in the marathon (1923)

== See also ==
- Italy at the 1920 Summer Olympics
- Italy at the 1924 Summer Olympics
