= Ernesto Alciati =

Italian long-distance runner

Personal information
- Nationality: Italian
- Born: 3 December 1902 Asti, Italy
- Died: 27 September 1984 (aged 81)

Sport
- Sport: Athletics
- Event: Marathon
- Club: A. Pod. Liberi Astigiani

Achievements and titles
- Personal best: Marathon: 2:50:43 (1924)

Ernesto Alciati (3 December 1902 – 27 September 1984) was an Italian long-distance runner. He participated in the 1924 Summer Olympics marathon but did not finish.

== Biography ==
He competed in the marathon at the 1924 Summer Olympics but did not finish the race Alciati's personal best in the marathon was 2:50:43 established in 1924. His athletic club was Associazione Podistica Liberi Astigiani (Running Association Free Astigians).

Alciati is one of five athletes born in the town of Asti who have participated in the Olympic Games. The others are pole-vaulter Silvio Fraquelli, basketball player Luca Garri, racewalker Rossella Giordano and bobsledder Matteo Torchio.

== Achievements ==
Year	Competition	Venue	Position	Event	Performance	Note
1924	Olympic Games	(France) Paris	DNF	Marathon	-	

== See also ==
- Italy at the 1924 Summer Olympics
