= Giuseppe Aliberti =

Italian footballer (1901–1956)

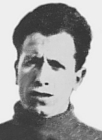

Personal information
- Date of birth: 5 March 1901
- Place of birth: Turin, Italy
- Date of death: 8 January 1956 (aged 54)
- Position: Midfielder

Youth career
- 1917–1920: Torino

Senior career*
Years	Team	Apps	(Gls)
1920–1937	Biellese	2	(0)
1937–1938	Torino	126	(8)
1920–1937	Biellese	19	(2)

International career
1923–1925	Italy	11	(0)

Managerial career
- 1931–1932: Torino
- 1933–1934: Biellese
- * Club domestic league appearances and goals

Giuseppe Aliberti (Italian pronunciation: [dʒuˈzɛppe aliˈbɛrti]; 5 March 1901 – 8 January 1956) was an Italian football manager and former player who played as a midfielder.

== Career ==
Aliberti played 3 seasons (31 games) in the Italian Serie A with A.C. Torino. Aliberti made his debut for the Italy national football team on 1 January 1923 in a game against Germany. He represented Italy at the 1924 Summer Olympics.

== Honours ==
=== Player ===
==== Club ====
Torino

- Italian Football Championship/Serie A: 1927–28
