= Belisario Villacís =

Ecuadorian long-distance runner

Personal information
- Nationality: Ecuadorian
- Born: 1899

Sport
- Sport: Long-distance running
- Event: Marathon

Belisario Villacís (born 1899, date of death unknown) was an Ecuadorian long-distance runner. He competed in the marathon at the 1924 Summer Olympics.
