= Gabriel Verger =

French long-distance runner

Personal information
- Nationality: French
- Born: 30 August 1896

Sport
- Sport: Long-distance running
- Event: Marathon

Gabriel Verger (born 30 August 1896, date of death unknown) was a French long-distance runner. He competed in the marathon at the 1924 Summer Olympics.
