= Tullio Biscuola =

Italian marathon runner

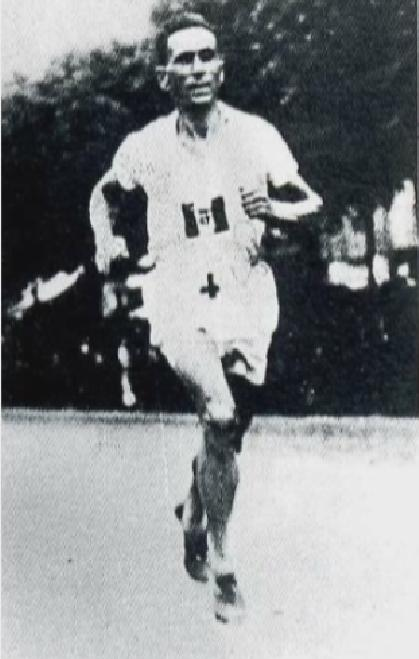

Personal information
- Nationality: Italian
- Born: 12 July 1894 Rovigo, Italy
- Died: 13 February 1963 (aged 68)

Sport
- Country: Italy
- Sport: Athletics
- Event: Marathon
- Club: Rhodigium Roma

Tullio Biscuola (12 July 1894 – 13 February 1963) was an Italian marathon runner.

== Biography ==
Biscuola competed in the marathon at the 1924 Summer Olympics, which was his only cap for the national team. In the town of Rovigo a sport venue is dedicated to his memory.

== Achievements ==
Year	Competition	Venue	Position	Event	Performance	Note
1924	Olympic Games	(France) Paris	22nd	Marathon	3:19:05	
