= Ralph Williams (athlete) =

American long-distance runner

Personal information
- Nationality: American
- Born: August 7, 1900 Quincy, Massachusetts, United States
- Died: July 6, 1941 (aged 40)

Sport
- Sport: Long-distance running
- Event: Marathon

Ralph Williams (August 7, 1900 – July 6, 1941) was an American long-distance runner. He competed in the marathon at the 1924 Summer Olympics. He made it on the US Olympic Team after finishing 7th in the Boston Marathon on April 19, 1924, with a time of 2:41:58.6. The Boston Marathon was later measured and found to be 152 meters short.

== 1924 Summer Olympics ==
Prior to the marathon, the American team ran a 15-mile time trial. It was a particularly warm day in Paris, where the Olympics were being held, and Williams quit after 3 miles. Coach Michael Ryan, who didn't finish either of the two Olympic marathons he ran, suggested that Williams be pulled from the event. The "head coach and the chairman of the Selection Committee" overruled Ryan and chose to run Williams rather than Carl Linder. Williams did not finish the race.
