= Ernest Clark (athlete) =

British racewalker

Frederick Ernest "Ernie" Clark (25 March 1898 – September 1993) was a British track and field athlete. He was born in Morden and known for competing in racewalking of the 1924 Summer Olympics. In 1924, he finished sixth in the 10 km competition at the Paris Olympics.

== Sources ==
- Ernie Clark. Sports Reference. Retrieved on 2015-01-21.
