= Arne Gaupset =

Norwegian wrestler

- Born: 16 April 1894; Møre og Romsdal, Norway
- Died: 18 February 1976 (aged 81); Møre og Romsdal, Norway

Arne Gaupset (16 April 1894 – 18 February 1976) was a Norwegian sport wrestler. He was born in Kristiansund and represented the club IL Braatt. He competed at the 1924 Summer Olympics, when he placed tied fifth in Greco-Roman wrestling, the lightweight class.
