= Erling Michelsen =

Norwegian wrestler

- Born: 24 May 1899; Lilleaker, Norway
- Died: 19 September 1976 (aged 77); Lilleaker, Norway

Erling Svend Konrad Michelsen (24 May 1899 – 19 September 1976) was a Norwegian sport wrestler. He was born in Lilleaker and represented the club Lilleaker IF. He competed at the 1924 Summer Olympics, in Greco-Roman wrestling, the lightweight class.
