= Francisco Solé (wrestler) =

Spanish wrestler

- Born: 1900

Francisco Solé (born 1900, date of death unknown) was a Spanish wrestler. He competed in the Greco-Roman lightweight event at the 1924 Summer Olympics.
