= Roberto De Marchi =

Italian wrestler

- Born: 20 August 1896; Genoa, Italy

Roberto De Marchi (born 20 August 1896, date of death unknown) was an Italian wrestler. He competed in the Greco-Roman lightweight event at the 1924 Summer Olympics.
