= Romeo Bertini =

Italian athlete

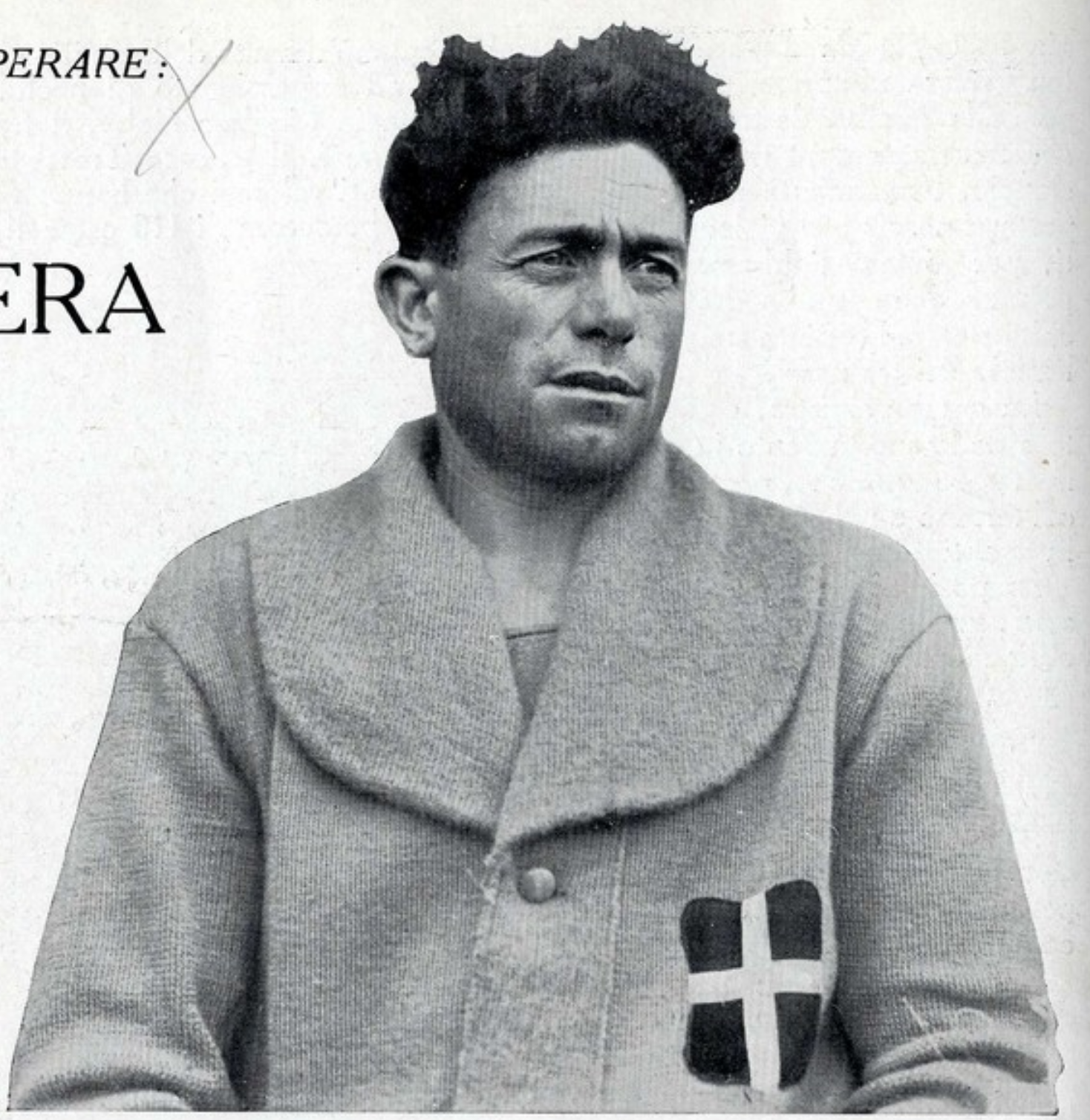
- Romeo Bertini in 1920.

Personal information
- Nationality: Italian
- Born: 21 April 1893 Gessate, Italy
- Died: 29 August 1973 (aged 80) Milan, Italy

Sport
- Country: Italy
- Sport: Athletics
- Event: Marathon
- Club: SC Agamennone Milano

Achievements and titles
- Personal best: Marathon: 2:47:20 (1924)
Medal record
| Silver medal – second place | 1924 Paris | Marathon |

Romeo Bertini (21 April 1893 – 29 August 1973) was an Italian athlete who competed mainly in the marathon.

== Biography ==
He competed for Italy in the 1924 Summer Olympics held in Paris, France in the marathon where he won the silver medal. He also competed in the marathon at the 1928 Summer Olympics, but didn't finish.

== Achievements ==
| Year | Competition | Venue | Position | Event | Performance | Note |
|---|---|---|---|---|---|---|
| 1924 | Olympic Games | (France) Paris | 2nd | Marathon | 2:47:20 | |
| 1928 | Olympic Games | (Netherlands) Amsterdam | DNF | Marathon | - | |
