= Frank Zuna =

American long-distance runner

Personal information
- Nationality: American
- Born: January 2, 1893 Newark, New Jersey, United States
- Died: January 1983 Nevada, United States

Sport
- Sport: Long-distance running
- Event: Marathon
- Club: I-AAC, Queens, New York

Frank Thomas Zuna (January 2, 1893 – January 1983) was an American long-distance runner who competed at the 1924 Summer Olympics.

== Career ==
In 1921, he won the Boston Marathon. Three years later, he competed in the marathon at the 1924 Olympic Games.

The following year Zuna finished second behind Sam Ferris in the marathon event at the British 1925 AAA Championships.
