= Alfred Praks =

Estonian wrestler

- Born: 31 March 1902; Tallinn, Governorate of Estonia, Russian Empire
- Died: 18 October 1998 (aged 96); Borås, Sweden

Alfred Praks (31 March 1902 – 18 October 1998) was an Estonian wrestler. He competed at the 1924 and the 1928 Summer Olympics.

In 1944, Praks fled the Soviet occupation of Estonia and settled in Sweden.
