= Frank Wendling =

American long-distance runner

Personal information
- Born: August 25, 1897 Buffalo, New York, United States
- Died: August 30, 1966 (aged 69) Buffalo, New York, United States

Sport
- Sport: Long-distance running
- Event: Marathon

Frank Wendling (August 25, 1897 – August 30, 1966) was an American long-distance runner. He competed in the marathon at the 1924 Summer Olympics.
