= Giuseppe Laveni =

Italian sports shooter

Personal information
- Born: 1877 Milan, Italy
- Died: Unknown

Sport
- Sport: Sports shooting

Giuseppe Laveni (born 1877, date of death unknown) was an Italian sports shooter. He competed in three events at the 1924 Summer Olympics.
