= Vergier =

Vergier is a surname. Notable people with the surname include:

- Charles Paumier du Vergier (1874–?), Belgian sport shooter
- Henri-Auguste-Georges du Vergier (1805–1867), French politician
- Jean du Vergier de Hauranne (1581–1643), French Catholic priest
- Loris Vergier (born 1996), French downhill mountain bike rider
