= Henk Keemink =

Dutch racewalker

Personal information
- Full name: Hendrik Keemink
- Nationality: Dutch
- Born: 16 December 1902
- Died: 7 June 1985 (aged 82)

Sport
- Sport: Athletics
- Event: Racewalking

Hendrik Keemink (16 December 1902 – 7 June 1985) was a Dutch racewalker. He competed in the men's 10 kilometres walk at the 1924 Summer Olympics.
