= Georges Metayer =

French wrestler

- Born: 1904

Georges Metayer (13 October 1904 – 23 February 1995) was a French wrestler. He competed in the Greco-Roman lightweight event at the 1924 Summer Olympics.
