= Paul Parisel =

French wrestler

- Born: 15 December 1904
- Died: 2 January 1987 (aged 82)

Paul Parisel (15 December 1904 – 2 January 1987) was a French wrestler. He competed at the 1924 and the 1928 Summer Olympics.
