= William Churchill (athlete) =

American long-distance runner

Personal information
- Nationality: American
- Born: August 27, 1885 Kimmeridge, Dorset, England
- Died: October 15, 1941 (aged 56) Effingham, Kansas, United States

Sport
- Sport: Long-distance running
- Event: Marathon

William Churchill (August 27, 1885 – October 15, 1941) was an American long-distance runner. He competed in the marathon at the 1924 Summer Olympics.
