= Mihály Matura =

Hungarian wrestler

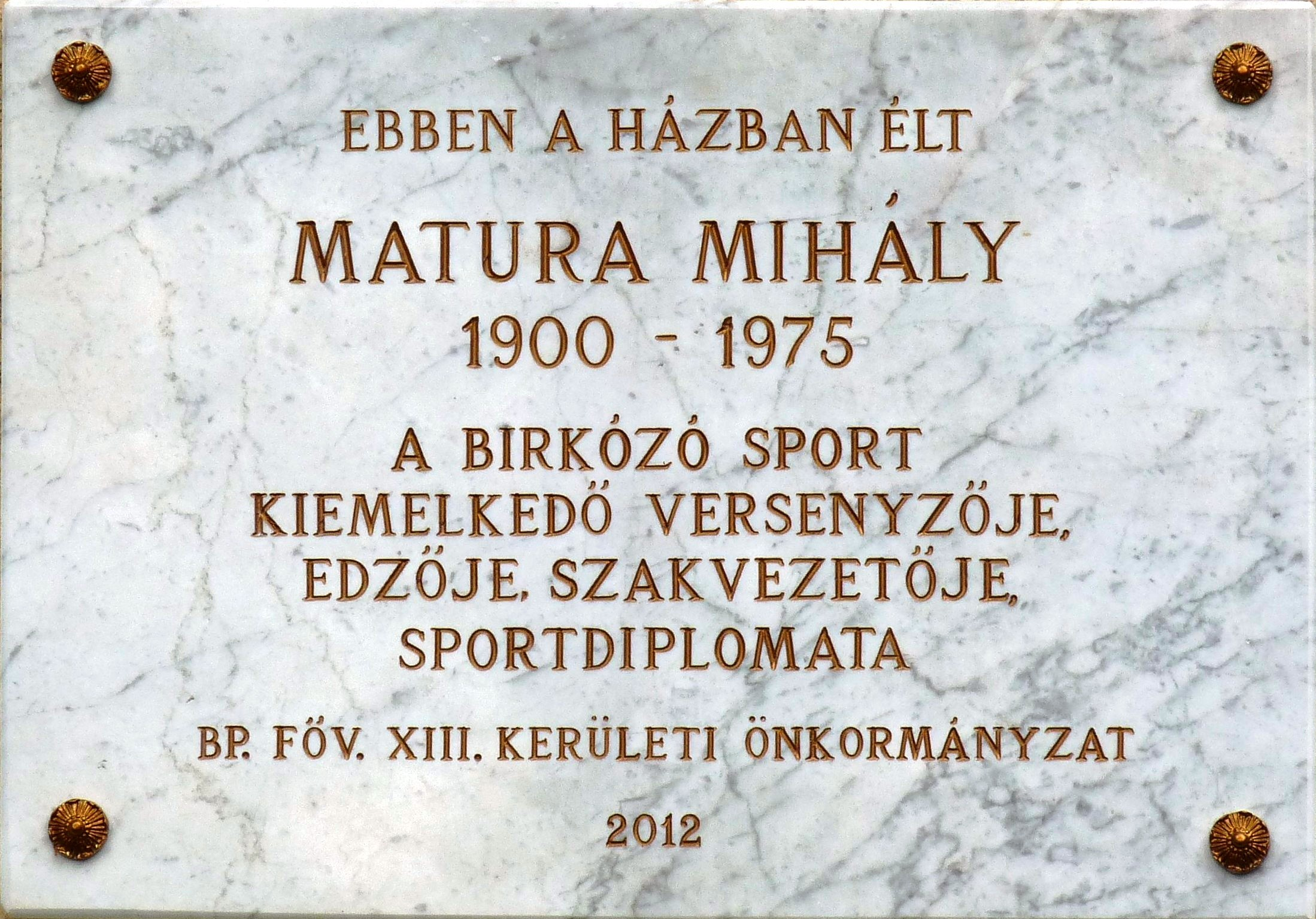
- Plaque affixed to his former house
- Born: 9 April 1900; Budapest, Hungary
- Died: 7 August 1975 (aged 75); Budapest, Hungary

Mihály Matura (9 April 1900 – 7 August 1975) was a Hungarian wrestler. He competed in the Greco-Roman lightweight event at the 1924 Summer Olympics.
