= Rudolf Kühnel =

Austrian racewalker

Personal information
- Nationality: Austrian
- Born: 25 February 1896
- Died: 28 January 1950 (aged 53)

Sport
- Sport: Athletics
- Event: Racewalking

Rudolf Kühnel (25 February 1896 – 28 January 1950) was an Austrian racewalker. He competed in the men's 10 kilometres walk at the 1924 Summer Olympics.
