= Otto Borgström =

Swedish wrestler

- Born: 4 April 1895; Malmö, Sweden
- Died: 20 September 1962 (aged 67); Malmö, Sweden

Otto Rikard Borgström (4 April 1895 – 20 September 1962) was a Swedish wrestler. He competed at the 1920 and 1924 Summer Olympics.
