= Walter Ranghieri =

Italian wrestler

- Born: 19 January 1895; Milan, Italy
- Died: 6 March 1949 (aged 54)

Walter Ranghieri (19 January 1895 – 6 March 1949) was an Italian wrestler. He competed at the 1920 and 1924 Summer Olympics.
