= Ray Watson (runner) =

American athlete

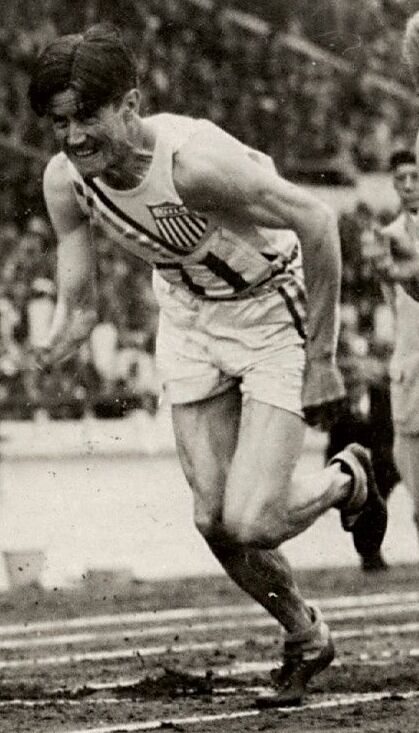
Ray Watson in 1928

Raymond Bates Watson (December 10, 1898 – September 7, 1974) was an American track and field athlete who competed in the 1920 Summer Olympics, in the 1924 Summer Olympics, and in the 1928 Summer Olympics.

He was born in Garden City, Kansas. At the age of thirteen lost his right hand in a shooting accident. Watson was occasionally referred to (erroneously) as "the one-arm wonder". He attended Kansas State University where he is remembered as the first "Kansas Miler".

== Olympics career ==
In 1920 he finished eighth in the 3000 metre steeplechase competition. Four years later he finished seventh in the 1500 metres event. At the 1928 Olympics he finished ninth in the 800 metres competition.

== Later life ==
Watson died in Quincy, Illinois in 1974.
