= Clarence DeMar =

American marathon runner (1888–1958)

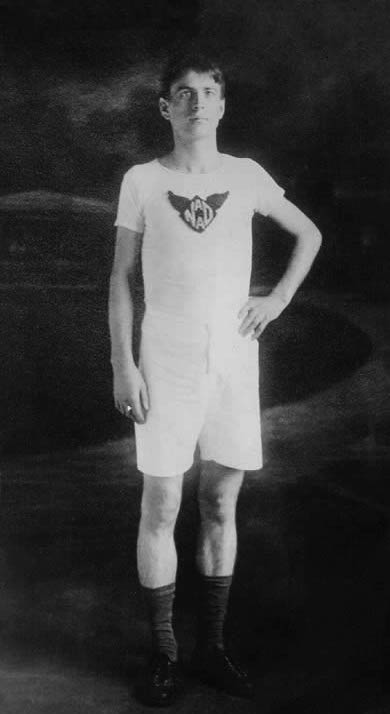

Personal information
- Born: June 7, 1888
- Died: June 11, 1958 (aged 70)
Medal record
Men's athletics
Representing the USA
Bronze medal – third place	1924 Paris	Marathon

Clarence Harrison DeMar (June 7, 1888 – June 11, 1958) was a U.S. marathoner, winner of seven Boston Marathons, and Bronze medalist at the 1924 Paris Olympics. He was known by the nickname "Mr. DeMarathon."

== Biography ==
DeMar was born in Madeira, Ohio. The 1910 Boston Marathon was DeMar's first; he finished 2nd. Later, in 1910, he was advised by a doctor that he had a heart murmur and should stop running within a year or two. The next year at the Boston Marathon, the doctors on the starting line advised him of his heart murmur and told him that he should drop out if he were fatigued and that he should not run any more races. Nevertheless, he won in 2:21:39, a course record. DeMar was one of the twelve members of the U.S. marathon team in the 1912 Summer Olympics, where he ran poorly, finishing 12th, complaining that the coaching staff's dictatorial control over the athletes' training had harmed the team's performance.

Although DeMar ran a few races after the Olympics, he soon took a break from serious competition. In his autobiography, he gave his reasons as (1) continuing warnings from doctors that he was endangering his health, (2) concern that striving for individual athletic glory was incompatible with the spirit of his religion, and (3) demands on his time from the University extension courses that he was taking at Harvard and Boston University. In June 1915, DeMar received an Associate of Arts degree from Harvard while working as a printer in the Boston area.

DeMar resumed marathoning in 1917, finishing third in the Boston Marathon despite little training. He then set a course record in the Brockton Fair marathon. Sometime later, he was drafted into the army.

Although he ran some races while in the army, DeMar did not return to serious competition until 1922, when he again won the Boston Marathon in a course record 2:18:10. He repeated the victory in 1923 and 1924. In the latter year, the full Olympic distance – 26 miles, 385 yards – was run. He was selected as one of the six U.S. Olympic marathon team runners for the 1924 Summer Olympics, where he finished third.

DeMar continued his success with a second-place finish at the 1925 Boston Marathon and a third-place finish the next year. He followed that with five consecutive marathon victories: at the Baltimore Marathon in mid-May 1926; the Sesqui-Centennial Marathon (in Philadelphia) in June; the Port Chester Marathon in October; the Baltimore Marathon again in March 1927; and, on April 19, 1927, the Boston Marathon. He won at Boston again the next year to secure a spot in the 1928 Summer Olympics but ran poorly there in cool weather, finishing 27th. He would win one more Boston Marathon in 1930 at the age of 41.

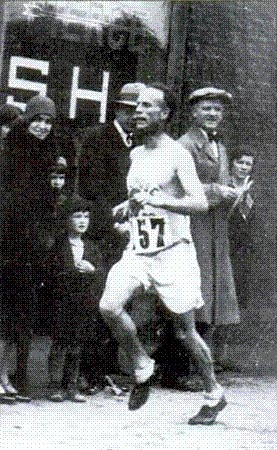
DeMar in 1930

In 1929, DeMar married and took a job teaching printing and industrial history at Keene Normal School to secure a more stable income. He spent time at Camp Zakelo (on Long Lake, in Maine), supervising the publication of the youth camp newspaper. In the fall of 1932, he began to work on a master's degree (which he earned in June 1934) at Boston University. He ran, walked, and hitchhiked to Boston from Keene, New Hampshire (by one route, 90 miles) and back each week. DeMar continued running until shortly before his death, running his last Boston marathon at age 65 and a 15 kilometer race at age 69. He died of cancer at the age of 70. In 2010, DeMar was posthumously inducted into the National Distance Running Hall of Fame. The Clarence DeMar marathon has been held in Keene annually since 1978 in his honor.

== See also ==
- List of winners of the Boston Marathon
