= Finland at the 1924 Summer Olympics =

- IOC code: FIN
- NOC: Finnish Olympic Committee

in Paris
- Competitors: 121 (all men) in 12 sports
- Flag bearer: Elmer Niklander
- Medals Ranked 2nd: Gold 14 Silver 13 Bronze 10 Total 37

Summer Olympics appearances (overview)
- 1908; 1912; 1920; 1924; 1928; 1932; 1936; 1948; 1952; 1956; 1960; 1964; 1968; 1972; 1976; 1980; 1984; 1988; 1992; 1996; 2000; 2004; 2008; 2012; 2016; 2020; 2024; 2028

Other related appearances
- 1906 Intercalated Games

Finland competed at the 1924 Summer Olympics in Paris, France. 121 competitors, all men, took part in 69 events in 12 sports.

== Medalists ==
Medal	Name	Sport	Event	Date
Gold	Paavo Nurmi	Athletics	Men's 1500 m	July 10
Gold	Paavo Nurmi	Athletics	Men's 5000 m	July 10
Gold	Paavo Nurmi	Athletics	Men's individual cross country	July 12
Gold	Ville Ritola	Athletics	Men's 10,000 m	July 6
Gold	Ville Ritola	Athletics	Men's 3000 m steeplechase	July 9
Gold	Elias Katz, Paavo Nurmi, Ville Ritola	Athletics	Men's 3000 m team race	July 13
Gold	Albin Stenroos	Athletics	Men's marathon	July 13
Gold	Heikki Liimatainen, Paavo Nurmi, Ville Ritola	Athletics	Men's team cross country	July 12
Gold	Jonni Myyrä	Athletics	Men's javelin throw	July 6
Gold	Eero Lehtonen	Athletics	Men's pentathlon	July 7
Gold	Kustaa Pihlajamäki	Wrestling	Men's freestyle bantamweight	July 14
Gold	Kalle Anttila	Wrestling	Men's Greco-Roman featherweight	July 10
Gold	Oskari Friman	Wrestling	Men's Greco-Roman lightweight	July 10
Gold	Edvard Westerlund	Wrestling	Men's Greco-Roman middleweight	July 10
Silver	Ville Ritola	Athletics	Men's 5000 m	July 10
Silver	Ville Ritola	Athletics	Men's individual cross country	July 12
Silver	Erik Wilén	Athletics	Men's 400 m hurdles	July 7
Silver	Elias Katz	Athletics	Men's 3000 m steeplechase	July 9
Silver	Vilho Niittymaa	Athletics	Men's discus throw	July 13
Silver	Konrad Huber	Shooting	Men's trap	July 9
Silver	Kaarlo Mäkinen	Wrestling	Men's freestyle bantamweight	July 14
Silver	Volmar Wikström	Wrestling	Men's freestyle lightweight	July 14
Silver	Eino Leino	Wrestling	Men's freestyle welterweight	July 14
Silver	Anselm Ahlfors	Wrestling	Men's Greco-Roman bantamweight	July 10
Silver	Aleksanteri Toivola	Wrestling	Men's Greco-Roman featherweight	July 10
Silver	Arthur Lindfors	Wrestling	Men's Greco-Roman middleweight	July 10
Silver	Edil Rosenqvist	Wrestling	Men's Greco-Roman heavyweight	July 10
Bronze	Eero Berg	Athletics	Men's 10,000 m	July 6
Bronze	Vilho Tuulos	Athletics	Men's triple jump	July 12
Bronze	Hans Dittmar	Sailing	Monotype class	July 13
Bronze	Lennart Hannelius	Shooting	Men's 25 m rapid fire pistol	June 28
Bronze	Werner Ekman, Konrad Huber, Robert Huber, Georg Nordblad, Toivo Tikkanen, Magnus Wegelius	Shooting	Men's team clay pigeons	July 7
Bronze	Arvo Haavisto	Wrestling	Men's freestyle lightweight	July 14
Bronze	Vilho Pekkala	Wrestling	Men's freestyle middleweight	July 14
Bronze	Väinö Ikonen	Wrestling	Men's Greco-Roman bantamweight	July 10
Bronze	Kalle Westerlund	Wrestling	Men's Greco-Roman lightweight	July 10
Bronze	Onni Pellinen	Wrestling	Men's Greco-Roman light heavyweight	July 10

== Athletics ==
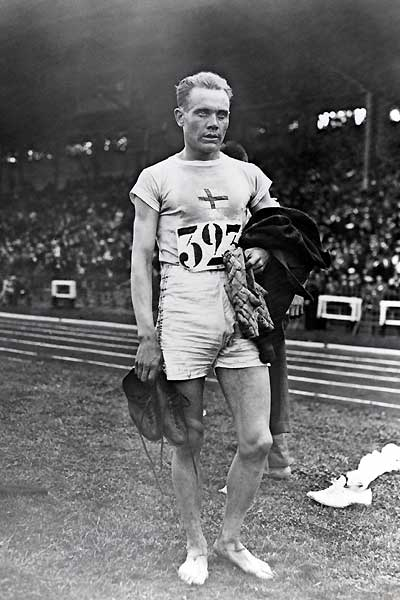
Paavo Nurmi

Fifty-two athletes represented Finland in 1924. It was the nation's fourth appearance in the sport as well as the Games. Nurmi won gold medals and set Olympic records in both the 1500 and 5000 metre races, with Ritola very close on his heels in the 5000 for silver. The pair finished first and second in the same order in the cross country race, as well. Nurmi did not defend his 1920 title in the 10000 metres, but Ritola earned the victory and the world record in that race. Ritola took another individual gold medal in the 3000 metre steeplechase. Nurmi and Ritola were each members of both the 3000 meter team race and team cross country teams which won gold; this gave Nurmi a total of five gold medals while Ritola took four golds and two silvers.

Stenroos won the marathon, while Myyrä took the javelin championship and Lehtonen finished first in the pentathlon. In all, the Finnish athletes took 17 medals, 10 of which were gold. They were second place behind the United States in both the total and gold medal counts in athletics.

Wilén earned an odd distinction: he set an Olympic record in a race which he did not win. He finished third in the 400 metre hurdles final after a pair of American hurdlers. The race winner, however, had knocked over a hurdle and his time was therefore ineligible to be considered a record. The second place runner had strayed outside his lane and was therefore disqualified. The result of all this was that Wilén received a silver medal and an Olympic record.

Ranks given are within the heat.

Athlete	Event	Heats		Quarterfinals		Semifinals		Final	
Athlete	Event	Result	Rank	Result	Rank	Result	Rank	Result	Rank
Erik Åström	400 m	52.1	2 Q	did not start		did not advance			
Eero Berg	10000 m	N/A						31:43.0	3rd place, bronze medalist(s)
Eero Berg	Cross country	N/A						did not finish	
Kalle Ebb	3000 m steeplechase	N/A				Unknown	3 Q	9:57.5	5
Yrjö Ekqvist	Javelin throw	N/A				56.15m	4 Q	57.56m	4
Erik Eriksson	Hammer throw	N/A				47.975m	3 Q	48.74m	4
Väinö Eskola	100 m	11.1	3	did not advance					
Reijo Halme	100 m	Unknown	2 Q	11.5	5	did not advance			
Lauri Halonen	Marathon	N/A						2:49:47.4	4
Lauri Härö	100 m	11.3	3	did not advance					
Lauri Härö	200 m	Unknown	4	did not advance					
Yrjö Helander	Pole vault	N/A				3.20	9	did not advance	
Henrik Hietakari	Marathon	N/A						did not finish	
Anton Husgafvel	100 m	Unknown	4	did not advance					
Antti Huusari	Decathlon	N/A						7005.175	4
Gösta Jansson	800 m	N/A		1:59.9	3 Q	1:59.4	5	did not advance	
Nestori Järvelä	3000 m steeplechase	N/A				Unknown	4	did not advance	
Pekka Johansson	Javelin throw	N/A				55.10	4	did not advance	
Martti Jukola	400 m hurdles	N/A		57.7	2 Q	58.6	5	did not advance	
Elias Katz	3000 m steeplechase	N/A				9:43.8 OR	1 Q	9:44.0	2nd place, silver medalist(s)
Hannes Kolehmainen	Marathon	N/A						did not finish	
Bror Kraemer	High jump	N/A				1.70	2	did not advance	
Ville Kyrönen	Marathon	N/A						did not finish	
Hugo Lahtinen	Pentathlon	N/A						27	6
Eero Lehtonen	Pentathlon	N/A						14	1st place, gold medalist(s)
Leo Leino	Pentathlon	N/A						23	4
Frej Liewendahl	1500 m	N/A				4:07.4	2 Q	4:00.3	8
Heikki Liimatainen	Cross country	N/A						38:18.0	12
Jaakko Luoma	1500 m	N/A				4:14.8	2 Q	4:03.9	12
Heikki Malmivirta	Discus throw	N/A				41.16	2	did not advance	
Jonni Myyrä	Javelin throw	N/A				59.30	2 Q	62.96	1st place, gold medalist(s)
Elmer Niklander	Shot put	N/A				14.265	3 Q	14.265	6
Elmer Niklander	Discus throw	N/A				42.09	3	did not advance	
Vilho Niittymaa	Discus throw	N/A				44.95	2 Q	44.95	2nd place, silver medalist(s)
Paavo Nurmi	1500 m	N/A				4:07.6	1 Q	3:53.6 OR	1st place, gold medalist(s)
Paavo Nurmi	5000 m	N/A				15:28.6	1 Q	14:31.2 OR	1st place, gold medalist(s)
Paavo Nurmi	Cross country	N/A						32:54.8	1st place, gold medalist(s)
Urho Peltonen	Javelin throw	N/A				55.67	3	did not advance	
Arvo Peussa	1500 m	N/A				4:17.4	1 Q	4:00.6	9
Ville Pörhölä	Shot put	N/A				14.10	3	did not advance	
Väinö Rainio	Long jump	N/A				6.54	6	did not advance	
Väinö Rainio	Triple jump	N/A				14.94	2 Q	15.01	4
Eino Rastas	5000 m	N/A				15:22.2	1 Q	Unknown	11
Eino Rastas	Cross country	N/A						did not finish	
Ville Ritola	5000 m	N/A				15:32.1	3 Q	14:31.4	2nd place, silver medalist(s)
Ville Ritola	10000 m	N/A						30:23.2 WR	1st place, gold medalist(s)
Ville Ritola	3000 m steeplechase	N/A				9:59.0	1 Q	9:33.6 OR	1st place, gold medalist(s)
Ville Ritola	Cross country	N/A						34:19.4	2nd place, silver medalist(s)
Julius Ruotsalainen	Marathon	N/A						did not finish	
Pauli Sandström	Long jump	N/A				6.83	2	did not advance	
Eino Seppälä	5000 m	N/A				15:34.6	3 Q	15:18.4	5
Väinö Sipilä	10000 m	N/A						31:50.2	4
Väinö Sipilä	Cross country	N/A						did not finish	
Albin Stenroos	Marathon	N/A						2:41:22.6	1st place, gold medalist(s)
Armas Taipale	Discus throw	N/A				40.215	4	did not advance	
Akseli Takala	Shot put	N/A				13.315	2	did not advance	
Hannes Torpo	Shot put	N/A				14.45	1 Q	14.45	4
Vilho Tuulos	Long jump	N/A				7.07	2 Q	7.07	4
Vilho Tuulos	Triple jump	N/A				14.84	5 Q	15.37	3rd place, bronze medalist(s)
Erik Wilén	400 m	54.8	2 Q	49.6	3	did not advance			
Erik Wilén	400 m hurdles	N/A		55.3	2 Q	55.4	3 Q	53.8 OR	2nd place, silver medalist(s)
Iivari Yrjölä	Pentathlon	N/A						did not finish	
Iivari Yrjölä	Decathlon	N/A						did not finish	
Paavo Yrjölä	Decathlon	N/A						6548.525	9
Väinö Eskola; Reijo Halme; Lauri Härö; Anton Husgafval	4 × 100 m relay	N/A		42.6	3	did not advance			
Erik Åström; Hirsch Drisin; Eero Lehtonen; Erik Wilén	4 × 400 m relay	N/A				3:32.2	3	did not advance	
Elias Katz; Frej Liewendahl; Paavo Nurmi; Ville Ritola; Eino Seppälä; Sameli Tala	4 × 400 m relay	N/A				6	1 Q	8	1st place, gold medalist(s)
Eero Berg; Heikki Liimatainen; Paavo Nurmi; Eino Rastas; Ville Ritola; Väinö Sipilä	Team cross country	N/A						11	1st place, gold medalist(s)

== Cycling ==
Four cyclists represented Finland in 1924. It was the nation's second appearance in the sport.

=== Road cycling ===
Ranks given are within the heat.

Cyclist	Event	Final	
Cyclist	Event	Result	Rank
Anton Collin	Time trial	did not finish	
Erik Frank	Time trial	8:04:53.0	52
Toivo Hörkkö	Time trial	8:18:00.0	56
Ilmari Voudelin	Time trial	7:41:03.4	47
Anton Collin; Erik Frank; Toivo Hörkkö; Ilmari Voudelin	Team time trial	24:03:56.4	13

== Diving ==
Six divers, all men, represented Finland in 1924. It was the nation's fourth appearance in the sport as well as the Games. Kärkkäinen was the only Finnish diver to advance to a final, finishing ninth in the platform event.

Ranks given are within the heat.

Men

Diver	Event	Semifinals			Final		
Diver	Event	Points	Score	Rank	Points	Score	Rank
Jussi Elo	Plain high diving	21.5	141	6	did not advance		
Hannes Kärkkäinen	10 m platform	16	408.2	3 Q	40.5	380.9	9
Hugo Koivuniemi	Plain high diving	28	123	6	did not advance		
Lauri Kyöstilä	10 m platform	23	363.4	5	did not advance		
Atte Lindqvist	3 m board	25	398.8	5	did not advance		
Yrjö Valkama	Plain high diving	19.5	150	5	did not advance		

== Equestrian ==
A single equestrian represented Finland in 1924. It was the nation's second appearance in the sport.

Equestrian	Event	Final		
Equestrian	Event	Score	Time	Rank
Lars Ehrnrooth	Eventing	did not advance		

== Gymnastics ==
Eight gymnasts represented Finland in 1924. It was the nation's third appearance in the sport.

=== Artistic ===
Gymnast	Event	Final	
Gymnast	Event	Score	Rank
Mikko Hämäläinen	All-around	65.233	61
Mikko Hämäläinen	Horizontal bar	11.873	59
Mikko Hämäläinen	Parallel bars	17.01	56
Mikko Hämäläinen	Pommel horse	9.960	56
Mikko Hämäläinen	Rings	11.160	65
Mikko Hämäläinen	Rope climbing	0 (12.6 s)	63
Mikko Hämäläinen	Sidehorse vault	8.00	57
Mikko Hämäläinen	Vault	7.23	35
Väinö Karonen	All-around	65.180	63
Väinö Karonen	Horizontal bar	15.420	37
Väinö Karonen	Parallel bars	13.57	69
Väinö Karonen	Pommel horse	9.700	58
Väinö Karonen	Rings	9.160	69
Väinö Karonen	Rope climbing	3 (10.8 s)	47
Väinö Karonen	Sidehorse vault	7.83	59
Väinö Karonen	Vault	6.50	47
Eevert Kerttula	All-around	62.863	66
Eevert Kerttula	Horizontal bar	12.273	55
Eevert Kerttula	Parallel bars	18.63	43
Eevert Kerttula	Pommel horse	8.790	60
Eevert Kerttula	Rings	12.500	61
Eevert Kerttula	Rope climbing	1 (11.8 s)	58
Eevert Kerttula	Sidehorse vault	8.50	46
Eevert Kerttula	Vault	1.17	66
Eetu Kostamo	All-around	50.443	70
Eetu Kostamo	Horizontal bar	11.253	61
Eetu Kostamo	Parallel bars	10.13	72
Eetu Kostamo	Pommel horse	8.630	62
Eetu Kostamo	Rings	9.660	68
Eetu Kostamo	Rope climbing	0 (12.0 s)	60
Eetu Kostamo	Sidehorse vault	7.60	64
Eetu Kostamo	Vault	3.17	64
Jaakko Kunnas	All-around	73.473	51
Jaakko Kunnas	Horizontal bar	13.583	46
Jaakko Kunnas	Parallel bars	18.98	38
Jaakko Kunnas	Pommel horse	8.660	61
Jaakko Kunnas	Rings	12.750	60
Jaakko Kunnas	Rope climbing	5 (10.2 s)	41
Jaakko Kunnas	Sidehorse vault	7.27	68
Jaakko Kunnas	Vault	7.23	35
Aarne Roine	All-around	65.460	59
Aarne Roine	Horizontal bar	13.280	49
Aarne Roine	Parallel bars	15.62	63
Aarne Roine	Pommel horse	9.130	59
Aarne Roine	Rings	10.080	66
Aarne Roine	Rope climbing	0 (12.6 s)	63
Aarne Roine	Sidehorse vault	7.43	66
Aarne Roine	Vault	7.17	38
Akseli Roine	All-around	66.503	56
Akseli Roine	Horizontal bar	12.233	56
Akseli Roine	Parallel bars	17.03	54
Akseli Roine	Pommel horse	8.070	64
Akseli Roine	Rings	12.830	59
Akseli Roine	Rope climbing	5 (10.2 s)	41
Akseli Roine	Sidehorse vault	6.87	69
Akseli Roine	Vault	7.22	37
Otto Suhonen	All-around	72.843	52
Otto Suhonen	Horizontal bar	15.853	34
Otto Suhonen	Parallel bars	16.63	60
Otto Suhonen	Pommel horse	9.870	57
Otto Suhonen	Rings	9.160	69
Otto Suhonen	Rope climbing	6 (9.8 s)	35
Otto Suhonen	Sidehorse vault	8.33	50
Otto Suhonen	Vault	7.00	43
Mikko Hämäläinen; Väinö Karonen; Eevert Kerttula; Eetu Kostamo; Jaakko Kunnas; Aarne Roine; Akseli Roine; Otto Suhonen	Team	554.948	7

== Modern pentathlon ==
Three pentathletes represented Finland in 1924. It was the nation's second appearance in the sport.

Pentathlete	Event	Final	
Pentathlete	Event	Score	Rank
Henrik Avellan	Individual	55.5	5
Väinö Bremer	Individual	66.5	9
Emil Hagelberg	Individual	110.5	25

== Sailing ==
A single sailor represented Finland in 1924. It was the nation's second appearance in the sport.

Sailor	Event	Qualifying				Final			
Sailor	Event	Race 1	Race 2	Race 3	Total	Race 1	Race 2	Total	Rank
Hans Dittmar	Olympic monotype	1 Q	2 Q	N/A		5	3	8	3rd place, bronze medalist(s)

== Shooting ==
Fifteen sport shooters represented Finland in 1924. It was the nation's fourth appearance in the sport as well as the Games. Seeking unsuccessfully to win its first gold medal in the sport, Finland matched its medal totals from 1920, taking a silver and two bronzes.

Shooter	Event	Final	
Shooter	Event	Score	Rank
Jalo Autonen	25 m rapid fire pistol	16	21
Jalo Autonen	100 m deer, single shots	34	12
Jalo Autonen	100 m deer, double shots	62	9
Werner Ekman	Trap	94	11
Lennart Hannelius	25 m rapid fire pistol	18	3rd place, bronze medalist(s)
Konrad Huber	Trap	98	2nd place, silver medalist(s)
Heikki Huttunen	50 m rifle, prone	387	20
Heikki Huttunen	600 m free rifle	77	44
Voitto Kolho	50 m rifle, prone	388	18
Martti Liuttula	100 m deer, single shots	37	5
Martti Liuttula	100 m deer, double shots	57	15
Veli Nieminen	600 m free rifle	81	31
Georg Nordblad	Trap	89	24
Unio Sarlin	25 m rapid fire pistol	18	7
Jean Theslöf	25 m rapid fire pistol	17	9
Jean Theslöf	50 m rifle, prone	393	4
Jean Theslöf	600 m free rifle	79	35
Toivo Tikkanen	100 m deer, single shots	33	15
Toivo Tikkanen	100 m deer, double shots	69	6
Toivo Tikkanen	Trap	Unknown	31–44
Antti Valkama	50 m rifle, prone	380	38
Antti Valkama	600 m free rifle	83	19
Magnus Wegelius	100 m deer, single shots	34	12
Magnus Wegelius	100 m deer, double shots	64	7
Jalo Autonen; Martti Liuttula; Toivo Tikkanen; Magnus Wegelius	Team deer, single shots	130	5
Jalo Autonen; Martti Liuttula; Toivo Tikkanen; Magnus Wegelius	Team deer, double shots	239	4
Heikki Huttunen; Voitto Kolho; Veli Nieminen; Jean Theslöf; Antti Valkama	Team free rifle	628	5
Werner Ekman; Konrad Huber; Robert Huber; Georg Nordblad; Toivo Tikkanen; Magnus Wegelius	Team clay pigeons	360	3rd place, bronze medalist(s)

== Swimming ==
Ranks given are within the heat.

Men

Swimmer	Event	Heats		Semifinals		Final	
Swimmer	Event	Result	Rank	Result	Rank	Result	Rank
Arvo Aaltonen	200 m breaststroke	3:11.0	4	did not advance			
Viljo Viklund	200 m breaststroke	3:12.4	4	did not advance			

== Tennis ==
Men

Athlete	Event	Round of 128	Round of 64	Round of 32	Round of 16	Quarterfinals	Semifinals	Final	
Athlete	Event	Opposition Score	Opposition Score	Opposition Score	Opposition Score	Opposition Score	Opposition Score	Opposition Score	Rank
Arne Grahn	Singles	Hunter (USA); L 3–6, 0–6, 2–6	did not advance						
Runar Granholm	Singles	Bye	Bye	Kingscote (GBR); L 2–6, 0–6, 2–6	did not advance				
Ernst Schildt	Singles	Bayley (AUS); L 1–6, 3–6, 4–6	did not advance						
Ernst Schybergson	Singles	Ferrier (SUI); L 4–6, 3–6, 3–6	did not advance						
Arne Grahn; Ernst Schybergson	Doubles	—N/a	Bye	Dumas / Robson (ITA); L 1–6, 3–6, 0–6	did not advance				
Runar Granholm; Ernst Schildt	Doubles	—N/a	Bye	Bye	Wennergren / Müller (FRA); L 3–6, 1–6, 4–6	did not advance			

== Wrestling ==
=== Freestyle wrestling ===
Men's

Athlete	Event	Round of 32	Round of 16	Quarterfinal	Semifinal	Final	
Athlete	Event	Opposition Result	Opposition Result	Opposition Result	Opposition Result	Opposition Result	Rank
Arvo Haavisto	Lightweight	—N/a	Corti (SUI); W	Praks (EST); W	Vis (USA); L Silver medal semifinal Pouvroux (FRA); W Bronze medal semifinal Eriksen (DEN); W	Silver medal final Wikström (FIN); L Bronze medal final Gardiner (GBR); W	3rd place, bronze medalist(s)
Edvard Huupponen	Featherweight	Guinard (FRA); W	Thys (BEL); W	Delmas (FRA); W	Newton (USA); L Bronze medal semifinal Naito (JPN); L	did not advance	
Eino Leino	Welterweight	—N/a	Janssens (BEL); W	Roosen (BEL); W	Gehri (SUI); L Silver medal semifinal Lookabough (USA); W	Silver medal final Johnson (USA); W	2nd place, silver medalist(s)
Fridolf Lundsten	Welterweight	—N/a	Davis (GBR); L	did not advance			
Kaarlo Mäkinen	Bantamweight	—N/a	Ducayla (FRA); W	Sansum (GBR); W	Larsson (SWE); W Silver medal semifinal Darby (GBR); W	Pihlajamäki (FIN); L Silver medal final Hines (USA); W	2nd place, silver medalist(s)
Iisak Mylläri	Light heavyweight	—N/a	Lay (GBR); W	Svensson (SWE); L	did not advance		
Hjalmar Nyström	Heavyweight	—N/a	Roth (SUI); L	did not advance			
Vilho Pekkala	Middleweight	—N/a	Wright (GBR); W	Smith (USA); W	Ollivier (BEL); L Bronze medal semifinal Bonassin (ITA); W	Bronze medal final Penttilä (FIN); W	3rd place, bronze medalist(s)
Johan Penttilä	Middleweight	—N/a	Durr (FRA); W	Hagemann (SUI); L	Silver medal semifinal Christoffersen (DEN); W Bronze medal semifinal Tognetti (SUI); W	Silver medal final Ollivier (BEL); L Bronze medal final Pekkala (FIN); L	4
Kustaa Pihlajamäki	Bantamweight	—N/a	Bye	Darby (GBR); W	Hines (USA); W	Mäkinen (FIN); W	1st place, gold medalist(s)
Toivo Pohjala	Heavyweight	—N/a	Bye	Roth (SUI); W	Nilsson (SWE); L	did not advance	
Volmar Wikström	Lightweight	—N/a	Eriksen (DEN); W	Jourdain (FRA); W	Gardiner (GBR); W Silver medal semifinal Montgomery (CAN); W	Vis (USA); L Silver medal final Wikström (FIN); W	2nd place, silver medalist(s)

=== Greco-Roman ===
Men's

Athlete	Event	First round	Second round	Third round	Fourth round	Fifth round	Sixth round	Seventh round	Eighth round	Rank
Athlete	Event	Opposition Result	Opposition Result	Opposition Result	Opposition Result	Opposition Result	Opposition Result	Opposition Result	Opposition Result	Rank
Anselm Ahlfors	Bantamweight	Hansson (SWE); W	Appruzèze (FRA); W	Gozzi (ITA); W	Pütsep (EST); L	Tasnádi (HUN); W	Ikonen (FIN); W	—N/a		2nd place, silver medalist(s)
Kalle Anttila	Featherweight	Torgensen (DEN); W	Dyršmid (TCH); W	Eriksen (DEN); W	Käpp (EST); W	Bye	Svensson (SWE); W	Nord (NOR); W	Toivola (FIN); W	1st place, gold medalist(s)
Oskari Friman	Lightweight	Gaupset (NOR); W	Beránek (TCH); W	Bye	Askehave (DEN); W	Matura (HUN); W	Keresztes (HUN); W	—N/a		1st place, gold medalist(s)
Väinö Ikonen	Bantamweight	Gozzi (ITA); W	Pütsep (EST); L	Koolmann (EST); W	Martinsen (NOR); W	Olsen (NOR); W	Ahlfors (FIN); L	—N/a		3rd place, bronze medalist(s)
Arthur Lindfors	Middleweight	Dumont (LUX); W	Okulicz-Kozaryn (POL); W	Yalaz (TUR); W	Grbić (YUG); W	Fischer (AUT); W	Gorletti (ITA); W	Westerlund (FIN); L	—N/a	2nd place, silver medalist(s)
Onni Pellinen	Light heavyweight	Nađ (YUG); W	Dömény (HUN); W	Misset (NED); W	Loo (EST); W	Bye	Svensson (SWE); L	Did not advance	—N/a	3rd place, bronze medalist(s)
Edil Rosenqvist	Heavyweight	Nilsson (SWE); W	Mileder (AUT); W	Sint (NED); W	Dame (FRA); W	Larsen (DEN); W	Deglane (FRA); L	—N/a		2nd place, silver medalist(s)
Johan Salila	Heavyweight	Giuria (ITA); W	Pothier (BEL); L	Larsen (DEN); L	did not advance			—N/a		9
Aleksander Toivola	Featherweight	Eriksen (DEN); W	Mezulian (AUT); W	Dyršmid (TCH); W	Torgensen (DEN); W	Svensson (SWE); W	Bye	Malmberg (SWE); W	Anttila (FIN); L	2nd place, silver medalist(s)
Emil Wecksten	Light heavyweight	Loo (EST); W	Ceccatelli (ITA); W	Varga (HUN); W	Svensson (SWE); L	Westergren (SWE); L	did not advance		—N/a	5
Edvard Westerlund	Middleweight	Sade (TUR); W	Dumont (BEL); W	Reinderman (NED); W	Nilsson (SWE); W	Christoffersen (DEN); W	Grbić (YUG); W	Lindfors (FIN); W	—N/a	1st place, gold medalist(s)
Karl Westerlund	Lightweight	Akbaş (TUR); W	Christoffel (BEL); W	Keresztes (HUN); L	Praks (EST); W	Kratochvíl (TCH); W	Kusnets (EST); W	—N/a		3rd place, bronze medalist(s)
