= Sweden at the 1924 Summer Olympics =

- IOC code: SWE
- NOC: Swedish Olympic Committee

in Paris
- Competitors: 159 (146 men and 13 women) in 15 sports
- Flag bearer: Einar Råberg
- Medals Ranked 8th: Gold 4 Silver 13 Bronze 12 Total 29

Summer Olympics appearances (overview)
- 1896; 1900; 1904; 1908; 1912; 1920; 1924; 1928; 1932; 1936; 1948; 1952; 1956; 1960; 1964; 1968; 1972; 1976; 1980; 1984; 1988; 1992; 1996; 2000; 2004; 2008; 2012; 2016; 2020; 2024

Other related appearances
- 1906 Intercalated Games

Sweden competed at the 1924 Summer Olympics in Paris, France. 159 competitors, 146 men and 13 women, took part in 84 events in 15 sports.

== Medalists ==
Medal	Name	Sport	Event	Date
Gold	Ernst Linder	Equestrian	Individual dressage	July 25
Gold	Åge Lundström, Axel Ståhle, Åke Thelning	Equestrian	Team jumping	July 27
Gold	Bo Lindman	Modern pentathlon		July 17
Gold	Carl Westergren	Wrestling	Men's Greco-Roman light heavyweight	July 10
Silver	Edvin Wide	Athletics	Men's 5000 m	July 10
Silver	Erik Byléhn, Nils Engdahl, Artur Svensson, Gustaf Wejnarth	Athletics	Men's 4 × 400 m relay	July 13
Silver	Gunnar Lindström	Athletics	Men's javelin throw	July 6
Silver	John Jansson	Diving	Men's plain high diving	July 15
Silver	Bertil Sandström	Equestrian	Individual dressage	July 25
Silver	Gustaf Hagelin, Claës König, Carl Gustaf Lewenhaupt, Torsten Sylvan	Equestrian	Team eventing	July 26
Silver	Gustaf Dyrssen	Modern pentathlon		July 17
Silver	Vilhelm Carlberg	Shooting	Men's 25 m rapid fire pistol	June 28
Silver	Otto Hultberg, Mauritz Johansson, Fredric Landelius, Alfred Swahn	Shooting	Men's 100 m team running deer, single shots	July 2
Silver	Arne Borg	Swimming	Men's 400 m freestyle	July 18
Silver	Arne Borg	Swimming	Men's 1500 m freestyle	July 15
Silver	Rudolf Svensson	Wrestling	Men's freestyle light heavyweight	July 14
Silver	Rudolf Svensson	Wrestling	Men's Greco-Roman light heavyweight	July 10
Bronze	Edvin Wide	Athletics	Men's 10,000 m	July 6
Bronze	Sten Pettersson	Athletics	Men's 110 m hurdles	July 9
Bronze	Erik Bohlin, Ragnar Malm, Gunnar Sköld	Cycling	Men's team time trial	July 23
Bronze	Hjördis Töpel	Diving	Women's 10 m platform	July 20
Bronze	Nils Hellsten	Fencing	Men's épée	July 11
Bronze	Sweden men's national football team: Axel Alfredsson; Charles Brommesson; Gustaf Carlsson; Albin Dahl; Sven Friberg; Karl Gustafsson; Fritjof Hillén; Konrad Hirsch; Gunnar Holmberg; Per Kaufeldt; Tore Keller; Putte Kock; Sigfrid Lindberg; Vigor Lindberg; Sven Lindqvist; Evert Lundqvist; Sten Mellgren; Gunnar Olsson; Sven Rydell; Harry Sundberg; Thorsten Svensson; Robert Zander	Football		June 13
Bronze	Bertil Uggla	Modern pentathlon		July 17
Bronze	Alfred Swahn	Shooting	Men's 100 m running deer, double shots	July 1
Bronze	Axel Ekblom, Mauritz Johansson, Fredric Landelius, Alfred Swahn	Shooting	Men's 100 m team running deer, double shots	July 3
Bronze	Åke Borg, Arne Borg, Thor Henning; Gösta Persson, Orvar Trolle, Georg Werner	Swimming	Men's 4 × 200 m freestyle relay	July 20
Bronze	Aina Berg, Gurli Ewerlund; Wivan Pettersson, Hjördis Töpel	Swimming	Women's 4 × 100 m freestyle relay	July 18
Bronze	Erik Malmberg	Wrestling	Men's Greco-Roman featherweight	July 10

== Athletics ==
Thirty-three athletes represented Sweden in 1924. It was the nation's sixth appearance in the sport as well as the Games. The Swedes took five medals, but none were gold.

Ranks given are within the heat.

Athlete	Event	Heats		Quarterfinals		Semifinals		Final	
Athlete	Event	Result	Rank	Result	Rank	Result	Rank	Result	Rank
Gösta Bergström	10000 m	N/A						Did not finish	
Gösta Bergström	Cross country	N/A						Did not finish	
Erik Blomqvist	Javelin throw	N/A				56.15	2 Q	56.15	6
Erik Byléhn	400 m	50.6	3	Did not advance					
Erik Byléhn	800 m	N/A		Unknown	5	Did not advance			
Carl-Axel Christiernsson	110 m hurdles	N/A		15.6	1 Q	15.4	1 Q	15.5	4
Sidon Ebeling	10000 m	N/A						Unknown	16
Sidon Ebeling	Cross country	N/A						Did not finish	
Nils Engdahl	400 m	49.2	1 Q	48.4	2 Q	48.6	6	Did not advance	
Axel Eriksson	5000 m	N/A				15:23.6	3 Q	15:38.0	8
Bertil Fastén	Pentathlon	N/A						Elim-3	
Bertil Fastén	Decathlon	N/A						Did not finish	
Bertil Jansson	Shot put	N/A				13.76	4	Did not advance	
Folke Jansson	Triple jump	N/A				14.97	2 Q	14.97	5
Helge Jansson	High jump	N/A				1.83	1 Q	1.85	6
Helge Jansson	Decathlon	N/A						6656.160	7
Rudolf Johansson	800 m	N/A		1:57.6	1 Q	1:55.7	4	Did not advance	
Henning Karlsson	Marathon	N/A						3:14:21.4	21
Gustav Kinn	Marathon	N/A						2:54:33.4	8
Hugo Lilliér	Javelin throw	N/A				52.95	7	Did not advance	
Carl Johan Lind	Hammer throw	N/A				44.785	7	Did not advance	
Gunnar Lindström	Javelin throw	N/A				60.81	1 Q	60.92	2nd place, silver medalist(s)
Sven Emil Lundgren	800 m	N/A		2:01.4	2 Q	1:57.6	4	Did not advance	
Evert Nilsson	Pentathlon	N/A						Elim-4	
Evert Nilsson	Decathlon	N/A						Did not finish	
Bror Österdahl	100 m	11.3	4	Did not advance					
Sten Pettersson	110 m hurdles	N/A		15.6	1 Q	15.6	2 Q	15.4	3rd place, bronze medalist(s)
Knut Russell	100 m	11.3	4	Did not advance					
Ivar Sahlin	Triple jump	N/A				14.16	5	Did not advance	
Ivar Sahlin	High jump	N/A				1.80	2	Did not advance	
Ossian Skiöld	Hammer throw	N/A				45.075	5 Q	45.285	5
Sixten Sundström	Shot put	N/A				13.53	5	Did not advance	
Artur Svensson	400 m	50.0	1 Q	50.0	2 Q	49.1	6	Did not advance	
Sven Thuresson	10000 m	N/A						Unknown	13
Sven Thuresson	Cross country	N/A						Did not finish	
Göran Unger	Pentathlon	N/A						Elim-4	
Gustaf Wejnarth	400 m	50.2	1 Q	50.2	3	Did not advance			
Curt Wiberg	100 m	11.4	4	Did not advance					
Edvin Wide	5000 m	N/A				15:24.0	2 Q	15:01.8	3rd place, bronze medalist(s)
Edvin Wide	10000 m	N/A						30:55.2	2nd place, silver medalist(s)
Edvin Wide	Cross country	N/A						Did not finish	
Gösta Bergström; Sidon Ebeling; Sven Thuresson; Edvin Wide	Team cross country	N/A						Did not finish	
Curt Branting; Nils Engdahl; Thor Österdahl; Curt Wiberg	4 × 100 m relay	N/A		43.8	1 Q	43.0	3	Did not advance	
Erik Byléhn; Nils Engdahl; Artur Svensson; Gustaf Wejnarth	4 × 400 m relay	N/A				3:37.5	2 Q	3:17.0	2nd place, silver medalist(s)
Axel Eriksson; Sven Emil Lundgren; Stig Reuterswärd; Edvin Wide	3000 m team	N/A				21	3	Did not advance	

== Boxing ==
Five boxers represented Sweden at the 1924 Games. It was the nation's debut in the sport. Andrén was the most successful, reaching the semifinals and finishing fourth place in the bantamweight division.

Boxer	Weight class	Round of 32	Round of 16	Quarterfinals	Semifinals	Final / Bronze match	
Boxer	Weight class	Opposition Score	Opposition Score	Opposition Score	Opposition Score	Opposition Score	Rank
Oscar Andrén	Bantamweight	González (URU); W	Lazarus (USA); W	Sánchez (ESP); W	Tripoli (USA); L	Ces (FRA); L	4
Gustaf Bergman	Featherweight	Abarca (CHI); L	Did not advance				17
Oscar Bergström	Flyweight	Bye	Trève (FRA); W	Fee (USA); L	Did not advance		5
Edvard Hultgren	Welterweight	Lewis (CAN); L	Did not advance				17
Harry Wolff	Bantamweight	Bye	Smith (RSA); L	Did not advance			9

Opponent nation	Wins	Losses	Percent
Canada	0	1	.000
Chile	0	1	.000
France	1	1	.500
South Africa	0	1	.000
Spain	1	0	1.000
United States	1	2	.333
Uruguay	1	0	1.000
Total	4	6	.400

Round	Wins	Losses	Percent
Round of 32	1	2	.333
Round of 16	2	1	.667
Quarterfinals	1	1	.500
Semifinals	0	1	.000
Final	0	0	–
Bronze match	0	1	.000
Total	4	6	.400

== Cycling ==
Four cyclists represented Sweden in 1924. It was the nation's fourth appearance in the sport. The Swedes competed only in the road cycling time trials. Two of the four placed in the top ten, but neither were able to secure a medal. The times of the top three Swedes were good enough to win the team bronze, however, making 1924 the third consecutive Games in which the Swedish road cyclists had won a team medal.

=== Road cycling ===
Cyclist	Event	Final	
Cyclist	Event	Result	Rank
Erik Bjurberg	Time trial	Did not finish	
Erik Bohlin	Time trial	6:36:12.4	7
Ragnar Malm	Time trial	6:49:53.0	17
Gunnar Sköld	Time trial	6:33:36.2	4
Erik Bjurberg; Erik Bohlin; Ragnar Malm; Gunnar Sköld	Team time trial	19:59:41.6	3rd place, bronze medalist(s)

== Diving ==
Eleven divers, seven men and four women, represented Sweden in 1924. It was the nation's fourth appearance in the sport. Despite having 11 of the nation's 14 entries reach the finals (3 divers competed in two events apiece), Sweden finished without a gold medal for the first time in its Olympic diving history. Jansson's silver in the men's plain high diving was the best result of the year, with Töpel adding a bronze medal in the women's platform.

Ranks given are within the heat.

Men

Diver	Event	Semifinals			Final		
Diver	Event	Points	Score	Rank	Points	Score	Rank
Erik Adlerz	10 m platform	11	475.2	2 Q	19	468.9	4
Erik Adlerz	Plain high diving	17.5	151	4	Did not advance		
Adolf Hellquist	3 m board	13	494.5	2 Q	30	544.9	6
Adolf Hellquist	10 m platform	9	442.8	2 Q	37.5	403.2	8
John Jansson	Plain high diving	17	144	3 Q	14.5	157	2nd place, silver medalist(s)
Edmund Lindmark	3 m board	10	557	2 Q	22	599.1	4
Helge Öberg	10 m platform	10	435.4	2 Q	31	429	6
Curt Sjöberg	3 m board	15	523	3 Q	34	538.4	7
Arvid Wallman	Plain high diving	8.5	165	1 Q	31.5	136	8

Women

Diver	Event	Semifinals			Final		
Diver	Event	Points	Score	Rank	Points	Score	Rank
Märta Johansson	3 m board	19	377.8	4	Did not advance		
Signe Johansson	3 m board	10	421.7	2 Q	21	412.6	5
Eva Olliwier	3 m board	14	408.8	3 Q	20	425.8	4
Eva Olliwier	10 m platform	20.5	148	5	Did not advance		
Hjördis Töpel	10 m platform	11.5	159	2 Q	15.5	164	3rd place, bronze medalist(s)

== Equestrian ==
Twelve equestrians represented Sweden in 1924; Sweden was one of two nations (along with France) to send the maximum number of riders. It was the nation's third appearance in the sport. Sweden's four medals was twice the number won by any other nation, and Sweden matched the Netherlands for most gold medals at two (a historical low for Sweden, which had taken four gold medals in both 1912 and 1920).

All four of Sweden's dressage competitors finished in the top five, with France's Lesage taking the bronze to break up the Swedish dominance—Sweden had swept the medals in each of the two previous Games. In contrast, König at fifth was the only Swede in the top five of the eventing and no Swedes finished in the top five in jumping (though two came in the top seven). Nevertheless, Sweden took silver in the combined team score for eventing and gold in the jumping team competition.

Equestrian	Event	Final		
Equestrian	Event	Score	Time	Rank
Victor Ankarcrona	Dressage	256.5	N/A	5
Gustaf Hagelin	Eventing	1335.0	N/A	20
Claës König	Eventing	1730.0	N/A	5
Carl Gustaf Lewenhaupt	Eventing	Did not finish		
Ernst Linder	Dressage	276.4	N/A	1st place, gold medalist(s)
Åge Lundström	Jumping	18.00	2:38.4	11
Bertil Sandström	Dressage	275.8	N/A	2nd place, silver medalist(s)
Axel Ståhle	Jumping	12.25	2:40.0	7
Torsten Sylvan	Eventing	1678.0	N/A	9
Åke Thelning	Jumping	12.00	2:30.4	6
Georg von Braun	Jumping	23.50	2:45.6	19
Wilhelm von Essen	Dressage	260.0	N/A	4
Gustaf Hagelin; Claës König; Carl Gustaf Lewenhaupt; Torsten Sylvan	Team eventing	4743.5	N/A	2nd place, silver medalist(s)
Åge Lundström; Axel Ståhle; Åke Thelning; Georg von Braun	Team jumping	42.25	N/A	1st place, gold medalist(s)

== Fencing ==
Nine fencers, six men and three women, represented Sweden in 1924. It was the nation's fifth appearance in the sport; Sweden was one of nine nations to send women to the first Olympic women's fencing competition. Hellsten won Sweden's first Olympic fencing medal with the bronze in the épée.

Men

Ranks given are within the pool.

Fencer	Event	Round 1		Round 2		Quarterfinals		Semifinals		Final	
Fencer	Event	Result	Rank	Result	Rank	Result	Rank	Result	Rank	Result	Rank
Carl Gripenstedt	Épée	5–4	4 Q	N/A		7–2	1 Q	4–7	7	Did not advance	
Nils Hellsten	Épée	8–1	1 Q	N/A		6–3	1 Q	6–5	2 Q	7–4	3rd place, bronze medalist(s)
Bror Lagercrantz	Épée	4–5	6 Q	N/A		2–8	10	Did not advance			
Gustaf Lindblom	Épée	6–3	1 Q	N/A		4–6	7	Did not advance			
Gustaf Dyrssen; Carl Gripenstedt; Nils Hellsten; Gustaf Lindblom; Bertil Uggla	Team épée	0–2	3	N/A		Did not advance					

Women

Ranks given are within the pool.

Fencer	Event	Quarterfinals		Semifinals		Final	
Fencer	Event	Result	Rank	Result	Rank	Result	Rank
Ellen Hamilton	Foil	3–2	2 Q	0–5	6	Did not advance	
Elsa Hellquist	Foil	3–3	4	Did not advance			
Hanna Olsen	Foil	3–2	3 Q	2–3	4	Did not advance	

== Football ==
Summary

Key:

- W – Win D – Draw L – Loss
- A.E.T – After extra time.
- RP – Game replayed

Team	Event	First round	Second round	Quarterfinal	Semifinal	Final / BM	
Team	Event	Opposition Score	Opposition Score	Opposition Score	Opposition Score	Opposition Score	Rank
Sweden men's	Men's tournament	Bye	Belgium; W 8–1	Egypt; W 5–0	Switzerland; L 1–2	Netherlands; D 1–1; W 3–1 RP	3rd place, bronze medalist(s)

Sweden competed in the Olympic football tournament for the fourth time in 1924. The Swedish side won the nation's first Olympic football medal, with a bronze, by defeating the Netherlands in the bronze medal match (which required a replay after the first match was drawn). The Swedes had reached that point by winning lopsided victories over Belgium, the defending champions, and Egypt before losing a tight match to Switzerland.

Round 1
Bye

Round 2

May 29, 1924

Sweden	8–1	Belgium
Kock 8' 24' 77'; Rydell 20' 61' 83'; Brommesson 30'; Keller 46'	Report	Larnoe 67'

Stade Olympique, Colombes
Attendance: 8,532
Referee: Heinrich Retschury (AUT)

Quarterfinals

June 1, 1924

Sweden	5–0	Egypt
Kaufeldt 5' 71'; Brommesson 31' 34'; Rydell 49'	Report

Stade Pershing
Attendance: 6,484
Referee: Henri Christophe (BEL)

Semifinals

June 5, 1924

Switzerland	2–1	Sweden
Abegglen 15' 77'	Report	Kock 41'

Stade Olympique, Colombes
Attendance: 7,448
Referee: Mihaly Ivancsics (HUN)

Bronze medal match

June 8, 1924

Sweden	1–1	Netherlands
Kaufeldt 44'	Report	le Fèvre 77'

Stade Olympique, Colombes
Attendance: 9,915
Referee: Heinrich Retschury (AUT)
June 9, 1924

Sweden	3–1	Netherlands
Rydell 34' 77'; Lundqvist 42'	Report	Formenoy 43' (pen.)

Stade Olympique, Colombes
Attendance: 40,522
Referee: Youssuf Mohamed (EGY)

== Modern pentathlon ==
Four pentathletes represented Sweden in 1924. It was the nation's third appearance in the sport. Sweden was one of six nations to have competed in each edition of the Olympic modern pentathlon to that point. For the third time, Sweden swept the medals.

Pentathlete	Event	Final	
Pentathlete	Event	Score	Rank
Carl Årmann	Individual	74.5	10
Gustaf Dyrssen	Individual	39.5	2nd place, silver medalist(s)
Bo Lindman	Individual	18	1st place, gold medalist(s)
Bertil Uggla	Individual	45	3rd place, bronze medalist(s)

== Sailing ==
Four sailors represented Sweden in 1924. It was the nation's fourth appearance in the sport.

Sailor	Event	Qualifying				Final			
Sailor	Event	Race 1	Race 2	Race 3	Total	Race 1	Race 2	Total	Rank
Karl Hammar	Olympic monotype	3	1 Q	N/A		3	8 (DNF)	11	6
Magnus Hellström; Nils Rinman; Olle Rinman	6 metre class	4	4	4	12	Did not advance			4

== Shooting ==
Nineteen sport shooters represented Sweden in 1924, winning two bronze and two silver medals.

Shooter	Event	Final	
Shooter	Event	Score	Rank
Gustaf Andersson	600 m free rifle	74	48
Eric Carlberg	25 m rapid fire pistol	17	9
Vilhelm Carlberg	25 m rapid fire pistol	18	2nd place, silver medalist(s)
Axel Ekblom	Trap	92	16
Olle Ericsson	50 m rifle, prone	385	26
Olle Ericsson	600 m free rifle	84	14
Mauritz Eriksson	50 m rifle, prone	386	24
Mauritz Eriksson	600 m free rifle	83	19
Sten Forselius	25 m rapid fire pistol	15	30
Magnus Hallman	Trap	88	29
Otto Hultberg	100 m deer, single shots	39	4
Hugo Johansson	600 m free rifle	88	8
Mauritz Johansson	100 m deer, single shots	36	7
Mauritz Johansson	100 m deer, double shots	57	15
Viktor Knutsson	50 m rifle, prone	392	7
Leon Lagerlöf	50 m rifle, prone	389	12
Fredric Landelius	100 m deer, single shots	32	17
Fredric Landelius	100 m deer, double shots	70	4
Fredric Landelius	Trap	93	14
Erik Lundquist	Trap	89	24
Karl-Gustaf Svensson	100 m deer, double shots	25	30
Alfred Swahn	100 m deer, single shots	37	6
Alfred Swahn	100 m deer, double shots	72	3rd place, bronze medalist(s)
Axel Ekblom; Mauritz Johansson; Fredric Landelius; Alfred Swahn	Team deer, double shots	250	3rd place, bronze medalist(s)
Otto Hultberg; Mauritz Johansson; Fredric Landelius; Alfred Swahn	Team deer, single shots	154	2nd place, silver medalist(s)
Gustaf Andersson; Olle Ericsson; Mauritz Eriksson; Hugo Johansson; Ivar Wester	Team free rifle	623	7
Axel Ekblom; Magnus Hallman; Fredric Landelius; Erik Lundquist; Karl Richter; Alfred Swahn	Team clay pigeons	354	5

== Swimming ==
Ranks given are within the heat.

Men

Swimmer	Event	Heats		Semifinals		Final	
Swimmer	Event	Result	Rank	Result	Rank	Result	Rank
Åke Borg	400 m freestyle	5:28.2	1 Q	5:25.0	2 Q	5:26.0	4
Åke Borg	1500 m freestyle	22:55.2	1 Q	21:59.4	3	Did not advance	
Arne Borg	100 m freestyle	1:05.4	1 Q	1:02.6	2 Q	1:02.0	4
Arne Borg	400 m freestyle	5:31.8	1 Q	5:21.4	1 Q	5:05.6	2nd place, silver medalist(s)
Arne Borg	1500 m freestyle	21:11.4 WR	1 Q	21:50.8	2 Q	20:41.4	2nd place, silver medalist(s)
Thor Henning	200 m breaststroke	3:04.2	2 Q	3:05.0	3	Did not advance	
Bo Johnsson	200 m breaststroke	3:12.2	3	Did not advance			
Bengt Linders	200 m breaststroke	3:03.4	1 Q	3:01.4	2 Q	3:02.2	4
Erik Skoglund	100 m backstroke	1:27.4	2 Q	1:26.6	6	Did not advance	
Orvar Trolle	100 m freestyle	1:04.2	1 Q	1:02.6	4	Did not advance	
Georg Werner	100 m freestyle	1:07.0	3	Did not advance			
Arne Borg; Åke Borg; Thor Henning^{*} Gösta Persson^{*} Orvar Trolle; Georg Werner	4 × 200 m freestyle relay	11:15.4	1 Q	10:08.2	2 Q	10:06.8	3rd place, bronze medalist(s)

^{*} – Indicates athlete swam in the preliminaries but not in the final race.

Women

Swimmer	Event	Heats		Semifinals		Final	
Swimmer	Event	Result	Rank	Result	Rank	Result	Rank
Gurli Ewerlund	100 m freestyle	1:23.2	4	Did not advance			
Gurli Ewerlund	400 m freestyle	7:05.4	4	Did not advance			
Jane Gylling	400 m freestyle	7:55.0	4	Did not advance			
Wivan Pettersson	100 m freestyle	1:27.4	4	Did not advance			
Wivan Pettersson	200 m breaststroke	—N/a		3:37.0	3 Q	3:37.6	4
Hjördis Töpel	100 m freestyle	1:25.8	4	Did not advance			
Hjördis Töpel	400 m freestyle	6:59.8	3	Did not advance			
Hjördis Töpel	200 m breaststroke	—N/a		3:39.0	2 Q	3:47.6	7
Aina Berg; Gurli Ewerlund; Wivan Pettersson; Hjördis Töpel	4 × 100 m freestyle relay	—N/a				5:35.6	3rd place, bronze medalist(s)

== Tennis ==
Men

Athlete	Event	Round of 128	Round of 64	Round of 32	Round of 16	Quarterfinals	Semifinals	Final	
Athlete	Event	Opposition Score	Opposition Score	Opposition Score	Opposition Score	Opposition Score	Opposition Score	Opposition Score	Rank
Henning Müller	Singles	Bye	Kingscote (GBR); L 2–6, 5–7, 2–6	Did not advance					
Charles Wennergren	Singles	Kirchmayr (HUN); W 8–6, 6–2, 6–4	Cousin (FRA); L 4–6, 3–6, 2–6	Did not advance					
Henning Müller; Charles Wennergren	Doubles	—N/a	Bye	Cattaruzza / Williams (ARG); W 6–2, 6–0, 6–3	Granholm / Schildt (FIN); W 6–3, 6–1, 6–4	Brugnon / Cochet (FRA); L 4–6, 1–6, 4–6	Did not advance		

Women

Athlete	Event	Round of 64	Round of 32	Round of 16	Quarterfinals	Semifinals	Final	
Athlete	Event	Opposition Score	Opposition Score	Opposition Score	Opposition Score	Opposition Score	Opposition Score	Rank
Lily von Essen	Singles	Golding (FRA); L 4–6, 2–6	Did not advance					
Sigrid Fick	Singles	Bye	Bye	McKane (GBR); L 1–6, 1–6	Did not advance			
Lily von Essen; Sigrid Fick	Doubles	—N/a	Bye	Wallis / Blair-White (IRL); W 6–2, 5–7, 6–2	Covell / McKane (GBR); L 2–6, 3–6	Did not advance		

Mixed

Athlete	Event	Round of 32	Round of 16	Quarterfinals	Semifinals	Final	
Athlete	Event	Opposition Score	Opposition Score	Opposition Score	Opposition Score	Opposition Score	Rank
Lily von Essen; Charles Wennergren	Doubles	Bouman / Timmer (NED); L 4–6, 4–6	Did not advance				
Sigrid Fick; Henning Müller	Doubles	Bye	de Borman / Halot (BEL); W 6–0, 6–3	Wightman / Williams (USA); L 6–8, 2–6	Did not advance		

== Water polo ==
Summary

Team	Event	Gold medal round				Silver medal round		Bronze medal round			Rank
Team	Event	First round	Quarterfinal	Semifinal	Final	Semifinal	Final	Quarterfinal	Semifinal	Final	Rank
Team	Event	Opposition Score	Opposition Score	Opposition Score	Opposition Score	Opposition Score	Opposition Score	Opposition Score	Opposition Score	Opposition Score	Rank
Sweden men	Men's tournament	Italy; W 7–0	Spain; W 9–0	France; L 2–4	Did not advance	Belgium; L 3–4	Did not advance	Bye	Hungary; W 4–1	United States; L 2–3	4

In its fourth Olympic water polo appearance, Sweden missed the medal podium for the first time.

Roster

- Cletus Andersson
- Erik Andersson
- Vilhelm Andersson
- Nils Backlund
- Theodor Nauman
- Martin Norberg
- Gösta Persson
- E. Skoglund
- N. Skoglund
- Hilmar Wictorin

First round

Sweden	7–0	Italy	Piscine des Tourelles

Quarterfinals

Sweden	9–0	Spain	Piscine des Tourelles

Semifinals

France	4–2	Sweden	Piscine des Tourelles

Silver medal semifinals

Belgium	4–3	Sweden	Piscine des Tourelles

Bronze medal quarterfinals
- Bye
Bronze medal semifinals

Hungary	1–4	Sweden	Piscine des Tourelles

Bronze medal final

Sweden	2–3	United States	Piscine des Tourelles

== Weightlifting ==
Athlete	Event	1H Snatch	1H Clean & Jerk	Press	Snatch	Clean & Jerk	Total	Rank
Rikard Brunn	Men's +82.5 kg						452.5	13
Bertil R. Carlsson	Men's -82.5 kg	65	90	85	90	115	445	13
Sigfrid Hylander	Men's -60 kg	55	—	—	—	—	DNF	—
Nils Lidman	Men's -75 kg	62.5	75	65	75	105	382.5	18
Martin Olofsson	Men's -67.5 kg	62.5	75	67.5	80	105	390	14

== Wrestling ==
=== Freestyle wrestling ===
Men's

Athlete	Event	Round of 32	Round of 16	Quarterfinal	Semifinal	Final	
Athlete	Event	Opposition Result	Opposition Result	Opposition Result	Opposition Result	Opposition Result	Rank
Hans Hansson	Featherweight	Bye	Newton (USA); L	Did not advance	Bronze medal semifinal Torgensen (DEN); W	Bronze medal final Naito (JPN); L	4
Axel Larsson	Bantamweight	—N/a	MacWilliam (USA); W	Bouquet (FRA); W	Mäkinen (FIN); L Bronze medal semifinal Hines (USA); L	Did not advance	
Carl Nilsson	Middleweight	—N/a	Bye	Rhys (GBR); L	Did not advance		
Ernst Nilsson	Heavyweight	—N/a	Bye	Flanders (USA); W	Pohjala (FIN); W Silver medal semifinal Wernli (SUI); L Bronze medal semifinal Retired	Steele (USA); L	Did not advance
Nils Nilsson	Featherweight	Bye	Delmas (FRA); L	Did not advance			
Johan Richthoff	Heavyweight	—N/a	Sangwine (GBR); W	Did not advance	Wernli (SUI); L Bronze medal semifinal Retired	Did not advance	
Johan Svensson	Light heavyweight	—N/a	Hutmacher (BEL); W	Mylläri (FIN); W	Courant (SUI); W Silver medal semifinal Westergren (SWE); W	Spellman (USA); L Silver medal final Wilson (GBR); W	2nd place, silver medalist(s)
Calle Westergren	Light heavyweight	—N/a	Bye	del Genovese (ITA); W	Spellman (USA); L Silver medal semifinal Svensson (SWE); L Bronze medal semifinal Retired	Did not advance	

=== Greco-Roman ===
Men's

Athlete	Event	First round	Second round	Third round	Fourth round	Fifth round	Sixth round	Seventh round	Eighth round	Rank
Athlete	Event	Opposition Result	Opposition Result	Opposition Result	Opposition Result	Opposition Result	Opposition Result	Opposition Result	Opposition Result	Rank
Otto Borgström	Lightweight	Ranghieri (ITA); W	Kusnets (EST); L	Matura (HUN); L	Did not advance			—N/a		=13
Hans Hansson	Bantamweight	Ahlfors (FIN); L	Bye	Magyar (HUN); W	Tasnádi (HUN); W	Herschmann (AUT); W	Pütsep (EST); L	—N/a		4
Claes Johansson	Heavyweight	Szelky (HUN); W	Deglane (FRA); L	Retired; L	Did not advance			—N/a		=13
Erik Malmberg	Featherweight	Porro (ITA); W	Bottin (BEL); W	Mezulian (AUT); W	Capron (FRA); W	Radvány (HUN); W	Nord (NOR); W	Toivola (FIN); L	Did not advance	3rd place, bronze medalist(s)
Carl Nilsson	Middleweight	Grbić (YUG); L	Doll (NED); W	Christoffersen (DEN); W	Westerlund (FIN); L	Did not advance			—N/a	=9
Ernst Nilsson	Heavyweight	Rosenqvist (FIN); L	Donati (ITA); W	Hansen (DEN); W	Deglane (FRA); L	Did not advance		—N/a		=5
Arvid Östman	Bantamweight	Magyar (HUN); L	Tasnádi (HUN); L	Did not advance				—N/a		=17
Johan Svensson	Light heavyweight	Walhelm (BEL); W	Berksoy (TUR); W	Nielsen (DEN); W	Wecksten (FIN); W	Moustafa (EGY); W	Pellinen (FIN); W	Westergren (SWE); L	—N/a	2nd place, silver medalist(s)
Konrad Svensson	Featherweight	Németh (HUN); W	Rottenfluc (FRA); W	Bye	Egeberg (NOR); W	Toivola (FIN); L	Anttila (FIN); L	Did not advance		5
Carl Westergren	Light heavyweight	Berksoy (TUR); W	Tázler (TCH); W	Tetens (DEN); W	Varga (HUN); W	Wecksten (FIN); W	Moustafa (EGY); W	Svensson (SWE); W	—N/a	1st place, gold medalist(s)
