= List of Olympic medalists in Greco-Roman wrestling =

This is the complete list of Olympic medalists in Greco-Roman wrestling.

Mijaín López is the only athlete in modern Olympics history to win five consecutive gold medals in the same individual event.

== Current program ==
=== Bantamweight ===
- 58 kg: 1924–1928
- 56 kg: 1932–1936
- 57 kg: 1948–1996
- 58 kg: 2000
- 55 kg: 2004–2012
- 59 kg: 2016
- 60 kg: 2020–present

Games	Gold	Silver	Bronze
1924 Paris	Eduard Pütsep; Estonia	Anselm Ahlfors; Finland	Väinö Ikonen; Finland
1928 Amsterdam	Kurt Leucht; Germany	Jindřich Maudr; Czechoslovakia	Giovanni Gozzi; Italy
1932 Los Angeles	Jakob Brendel; Germany	Marcello Nizzola; Italy	Louis François; France
1936 Berlin	Márton Lőrincz; Hungary	Egon Svensson; Sweden	Jakob Brendel; Germany
1948 London	Kurt Pettersén; Sweden	Mahmoud Hassan; Egypt	Halil Kaya; Turkey
1952 Helsinki	Imre Hódos; Hungary	Zakaria Chibab; Lebanon	Artem Teryan; Soviet Union
1956 Melbourne	Konstantin Vyrupayev; Soviet Union	Edvin Vesterby; Sweden	Francisc Horvat; Romania
1960 Rome	Oleg Karavayev; Soviet Union	Ion Cernea; Romania	Dinko Petrov; Bulgaria
1964 Tokyo	Masamitsu Ichiguchi; Japan	Vladlen Trostyansky; Soviet Union	Ion Cernea; Romania
1968 Mexico City	János Varga; Hungary	Ion Baciu; Romania	Ivan Kochergin; Soviet Union
1972 Munich	Rustam Kazakov; Soviet Union	Hans-Jürgen Veil; West Germany	Risto Björlin; Finland
1976 Montreal	Pertti Ukkola; Finland	Ivan Frgić; Yugoslavia	Farhat Mustafin; Soviet Union
1980 Moscow	Shamil Serikov; Soviet Union	Józef Lipień; Poland	Benni Ljungbeck; Sweden
1984 Los Angeles	Pasquale Passarelli; West Germany	Masaki Eto; Japan	Haralambos Holidis; Greece
1988 Seoul	András Sike; Hungary	Stoyan Balov; Bulgaria	Haralambos Holidis; Greece
1992 Barcelona	An Han-bong; South Korea	Rıfat Yıldız; Germany	Sheng Zetian; China
1996 Atlanta	Yuriy Melnichenko; Kazakhstan	Dennis Hall; United States	Sheng Zetian; China
2000 Sydney	Armen Nazaryan; Bulgaria	Kim In-sub; South Korea	Sheng Zetian; China
2004 Athens	István Majoros; Hungary	Geidar Mamedaliyev; Russia	Artiom Kiouregkian; Greece
2008 Beijing	Nazyr Mankiev; Russia	Rovshan Bayramov; Azerbaijan	Roman Amoyan; Armenia
2008 Beijing	Nazyr Mankiev; Russia	Rovshan Bayramov; Azerbaijan	Park Eun-chul; South Korea
2012 London	Hamid Sourian; Iran	Rovshan Bayramov; Azerbaijan	Péter Módos; Hungary
2012 London	Hamid Sourian; Iran	Rovshan Bayramov; Azerbaijan	Mingiyan Semenov; Russia
2016 Rio de Janeiro	Ismael Borrero; Cuba	Shinobu Ota; Japan	Stig-André Berge; Norway
2016 Rio de Janeiro	Ismael Borrero; Cuba	Shinobu Ota; Japan	Elmurat Tasmuradov; Uzbekistan
2020 Tokyo	Luis Orta; Cuba	Kenichiro Fumita; Japan	Walihan Sailike; China
2020 Tokyo	Luis Orta; Cuba	Kenichiro Fumita; Japan	Sergey Emelin; ROC
2024 Paris	Kenichiro Fumita; Japan	Cao Liguo; China	Zholaman Sharshenbekov; Kyrgyzstan
2024 Paris	Kenichiro Fumita; Japan	Cao Liguo; China	Ri Se-ung; North Korea
2028 Los Angeles			

=== Lightweight ===
- 66.6 kg: 1908
- 67.5 kg: 1912–1928
- 66 kg: 1932–1936
- 67 kg: 1948–1960
- 70 kg: 1964–1968
- 68 kg: 1972–1996
- 69 kg: 2000
- 66 kg: 2004–2016
- 67 kg: 2020–present

Games	Gold	Silver	Bronze
1908 London	Enrico Porro; Italy	Nikolay Orlov; Russian Empire	Arvid Lindén; Finland
1912 Stockholm	Emil Väre; Finland	Gustaf Malmström; Sweden	Edvin Mattiasson; Sweden
1920 Antwerp	Emil Väre; Finland	Taavi Tamminen; Finland	Frithjof Andersen; Norway
1924 Paris	Oskari Friman; Finland	Lajos Keresztes; Hungary	Källe Westerlund; Finland
1928 Amsterdam	Lajos Keresztes; Hungary	Eduard Sperling; Germany	Edvard Westerlund; Finland
1932 Los Angeles	Erik Malmberg; Sweden	Abraham Kurland; Denmark	Eduard Sperling; Germany
1936 Berlin	Lauri Koskela; Finland	Josef Herda; Czechoslovakia	Voldemar Väli; Estonia
1948 London	Gustav Freij; Sweden	Aage Eriksen; Norway	Károly Ferencz; Hungary
1952 Helsinki	Shazam Safin; Soviet Union	Gustav Freij; Sweden	Mikuláš Athanasov; Czechoslovakia
1956 Melbourne	Kyösti Lehtonen; Finland	Rıza Doğan; Turkey	Gyula Tóth; Hungary
1960 Rome	Avtandil Koridze; Soviet Union	Branislav Martinović; Yugoslavia	Gustav Freij; Sweden
1964 Tokyo	Kazım Ayvaz; Turkey	Valeriu Bularca; Romania	David Gvantseladze; Soviet Union
1968 Mexico City	Muneji Munemura; Japan	Stevan Horvat; Yugoslavia	Petros Galaktopoulos; Greece
1972 Munich	Shamil Khisamutdinov; Soviet Union	Stoyan Apostolov; Bulgaria	Gian-Matteo Ranzi; Italy
1976 Montreal	Suren Nalbandyan; Soviet Union	Ștefan Rusu; Romania	Heinz-Helmut Wehling; East Germany
1980 Moscow	Ștefan Rusu; Romania	Andrzej Supron; Poland	Lars-Erik Skiöld; Sweden
1984 Los Angeles	Vlado Lisjak; Yugoslavia	Tapio Sipilä; Finland	James Martinez; United States
1988 Seoul	Levon Julfalakyan; Soviet Union	Kim Sung-Moon; South Korea	Tapio Sipilä; Finland
1992 Barcelona	Attila Repka; Hungary	Islam Dugushiev; Unified Team	Rodney Smith; United States
1996 Atlanta	Ryszard Wolny; Poland	Ghani Yalouz; France	Aleksandr Tretyakov; Russia
2000 Sydney	Filiberto Azcuy; Cuba	Katsuhiko Nagata; Japan	Aleksey Glushkov; Russia
2004 Athens	Farid Mansurov; Azerbaijan	Şeref Eroğlu; Turkey	Mkhitar Manukyan; Kazakhstan
2008 Beijing	Steeve Guénot; France	Kanatbek Begaliev; Kyrgyzstan	Mikhail Siamionau; Belarus
2008 Beijing	Steeve Guénot; France	Kanatbek Begaliev; Kyrgyzstan	Armen Vardanyan; Ukraine
2012 London	Kim Hyeon-woo; South Korea	Tamás Lőrincz; Hungary	Steeve Guénot; France
2012 London	Kim Hyeon-woo; South Korea	Tamás Lőrincz; Hungary	Manuchar Tskhadaia; Georgia
2016 Rio de Janeiro	Davor Štefanek; Serbia	Mihran Harutyunyan; Armenia	Rasul Chunayev; Azerbaijan
2016 Rio de Janeiro	Davor Štefanek; Serbia	Mihran Harutyunyan; Armenia	Shmagi Bolkvadze; Georgia
2020 Tokyo	Mohammad Reza Geraei; Iran	Parviz Nasibov; Ukraine	Mohamed Ibrahim El-Sayed; Egypt
2020 Tokyo	Mohammad Reza Geraei; Iran	Parviz Nasibov; Ukraine	Frank Stäbler; Germany
2024 Paris	Saeid Esmaeili; Iran	Parviz Nasibov; Ukraine	Hasrat Jafarov; Azerbaijan
2024 Paris	Saeid Esmaeili; Iran	Parviz Nasibov; Ukraine	Luis Orta; Cuba
2028 Los Angeles			

=== Welterweight ===
- 72 kg: 1932–1936
- 73 kg: 1948–1960
- 78 kg: 1964–1968
- 74 kg: 1972–1996
- 76 kg: 2000
- 74 kg: 2004–2012
- 75 kg: 2016
- 77 kg: 2020–present

Games	Gold	Silver	Bronze
1932 Los Angeles	Ivar Johansson; Sweden	Väinö Kajander; Finland	Ercole Gallegati; Italy
1936 Berlin	Rudolf Svedberg; Sweden	Fritz Schäfer; Germany	Eino Virtanen; Finland
1948 London	Gösta Andersson; Sweden	Miklós Szilvási; Hungary	Henrik Hansen; Denmark
1952 Helsinki	Miklós Szilvási; Hungary	Gösta Andersson; Sweden	Khalil Taha; Lebanon
1956 Melbourne	Mithat Bayrak; Turkey	Vladimir Maneev; Soviet Union	Per Berlin; Sweden
1960 Rome	Mithat Bayrak; Turkey	Günther Maritschnigg; United Team of Germany	René Schiermeyer; France
1964 Tokyo	Anatoly Kolesov; Soviet Union	Kiril Petkov; Bulgaria	Bertil Nyström; Sweden
1968 Mexico City	Rudolf Vesper; East Germany	Daniel Robin; France	Károly Bajkó; Hungary
1972 Munich	Vítězslav Mácha; Czechoslovakia	Petros Galaktopoulos; Greece	Jan Karlsson; Sweden
1976 Montreal	Anatoly Bykov; Soviet Union	Vítězslav Mácha; Czechoslovakia	Karl-Heinz Helbing; West Germany
1980 Moscow	Ferenc Kocsis; Hungary	Anatoly Bykov; Soviet Union	Mikko Huhtala; Finland
1984 Los Angeles	Jouko Salomäki; Finland	Roger Tallroth; Sweden	Ștefan Rusu; Romania
1988 Seoul	Kim Young-nam; South Korea	Daulet Turlykhanov; Soviet Union	Józef Tracz; Poland
1992 Barcelona	Mnatsakan Iskandaryan; Unified Team	Józef Tracz; Poland	Torbjörn Kornbakk; Sweden
1996 Atlanta	Filiberto Azcuy; Cuba	Marko Asell; Finland	Józef Tracz; Poland
2000 Sydney	Murat Kardanov; Russia	Matt Lindland; United States	Marko Yli-Hannuksela; Finland
2004 Athens	Aleksandr Dokturishvili; Uzbekistan	Marko Yli-Hannuksela; Finland	Varteres Samurgashev; Russia
2008 Beijing	Manuchar Kvirkvelia; Georgia	Chang Yongxiang; China	Yavor Yanakiev; Bulgaria
2008 Beijing	Manuchar Kvirkvelia; Georgia	Chang Yongxiang; China	Christophe Guénot; France
2012 London	Roman Vlasov; Russia	Arsen Julfalakyan; Armenia	Emin Ahmadov; Azerbaijan
2012 London	Roman Vlasov; Russia	Arsen Julfalakyan; Armenia	Aleksandr Kazakevič; Lithuania
2016 Rio de Janeiro	Roman Vlasov; Russia	Mark Madsen; Denmark	Saeid Abdevali; Iran
2016 Rio de Janeiro	Roman Vlasov; Russia	Mark Madsen; Denmark	Kim Hyeon-woo; South Korea
2020 Tokyo	Tamás Lőrincz; Hungary	Akzhol Makhmudov; Kyrgyzstan	Rafig Huseynov; Azerbaijan
2020 Tokyo	Tamás Lőrincz; Hungary	Akzhol Makhmudov; Kyrgyzstan	Shohei Yabiku; Japan
2024 Paris	Nao Kusaka; Japan	Demeu Zhadrayev; Kazakhstan	Malkhas Amoyan; Armenia
2024 Paris	Nao Kusaka; Japan	Demeu Zhadrayev; Kazakhstan	Akzhol Makhmudov; Kyrgyzstan
2028 Los Angeles			

=== Middleweight ===
- 73 kg: 1908
- 75 kg: 1912–1928
- 79 kg: 1932–1960
- 87 kg: 1964–1968
- 82 kg: 1972–1996
- 85 kg: 2000
- 84 kg: 2004–2012
- 85 kg: 2016
- 87 kg: 2020–present

Games	Gold	Silver	Bronze
1908 London	Frithiof Mårtensson; Sweden	Mauritz Andersson; Sweden	Anders Andersen; Denmark
1912 Stockholm	Claes Johanson; Sweden	Martin Klein; Russian Empire	Alfred Asikainen; Finland
1920 Antwerp	Carl Westergren; Sweden	Arthur Lindfors; Finland	Masa Perttilä; Finland
1924 Paris	Edvard Westerlund; Finland	Arthur Lindfors; Finland	Roman Steinberg; Estonia
1928 Amsterdam	Väinö Kokkinen; Finland	László Papp; Hungary	Albert Kusnets; Estonia
1932 Los Angeles	Väinö Kokkinen; Finland	Jean Földeák; Germany	Axel Cadier; Sweden
1936 Berlin	Ivar Johansson; Sweden	Ludwig Schweickert; Germany	József Palotás; Hungary
1948 London	Axel Grönberg; Sweden	Muhlis Tayfur; Turkey	Ercole Gallegati; Italy
1952 Helsinki	Axel Grönberg; Sweden	Kalervo Rauhala; Finland	Nikolay Belov; Soviet Union
1956 Melbourne	Givi Kartozia; Soviet Union	Dimitar Dobrev; Bulgaria	Rune Jansson; Sweden
1960 Rome	Dimitar Dobrev; Bulgaria	Lothar Metz; United Team of Germany	Ion Țăranu; Romania
1964 Tokyo	Branislav Simić; Yugoslavia	Jiří Kormaník; Czechoslovakia	Lothar Metz; United Team of Germany
1968 Mexico City	Lothar Metz; East Germany	Valentin Oleynik; Soviet Union	Branislav Simić; Yugoslavia
1972 Munich	Csaba Hegedűs; Hungary	Anatoly Nazarenko; Soviet Union	Milan Nenadić; Yugoslavia
1976 Montreal	Momir Petković; Yugoslavia	Vladimir Cheboksarov; Soviet Union	Ivan Kolev; Bulgaria
1980 Moscow	Gennady Korban; Soviet Union	Jan Dołgowicz; Poland	Pavel Pavlov; Bulgaria
1984 Los Angeles	Ion Draica; Romania	Dimitrios Thanopoulos; Greece	Sören Claeson; Sweden
1988 Seoul	Mikhail Mamiashvili; Soviet Union	Tibor Komáromi; Hungary	Kim Sang-Kyu; South Korea
1992 Barcelona	Péter Farkas; Hungary	Piotr Stępień; Poland	Daulet Turlykhanov; Unified Team
1996 Atlanta	Hamza Yerlikaya; Turkey	Thomas Zander; Germany	Valery Tsilent; Belarus
2000 Sydney	Hamza Yerlikaya; Turkey	Sándor Bárdosi; Hungary	Mukhran Vakhtangadze; Georgia
2004 Athens	Aleksey Mishin; Russia	Ara Abrahamian; Sweden	Viachaslau Makaranka; Belarus
2008 Beijing	Andrea Minguzzi; Italy	Zoltán Fodor; Hungary	Nazmi Avluca; Turkey
2008 Beijing	Andrea Minguzzi; Italy	Zoltán Fodor; Hungary	None awarded
2012 London	Alan Khugaev; Russia	Karam Gaber; Egypt	Daniyal Gadzhiyev; Kazakhstan
2012 London	Alan Khugaev; Russia	Karam Gaber; Egypt	Damian Janikowski; Poland
2016 Rio de Janeiro	Davit Chakvetadze; Russia	Zhan Beleniuk; Ukraine	Javid Hamzatau; Belarus
2016 Rio de Janeiro	Davit Chakvetadze; Russia	Zhan Beleniuk; Ukraine	Denis Kudla; Germany
2020 Tokyo	Zhan Beleniuk; Ukraine	Viktor Lőrincz; Hungary	Denis Kudla; Germany
2020 Tokyo	Zhan Beleniuk; Ukraine	Viktor Lőrincz; Hungary	Ivan Huklek; Croatia
2024 Paris	Semen Novikov; Bulgaria	Alireza Mohmadi; Iran	Turpal Bisultanov; Denmark
2024 Paris	Semen Novikov; Bulgaria	Alireza Mohmadi; Iran	Zhan Beleniuk; Ukraine
2028 Los Angeles			

=== Heavyweight ===
- +93 kg: 1908
- +82.5 kg: 1912–1928
- +87 kg: 1932–1960
- +97 kg: 1964–1968
- 100 kg: 1972–1996
- 97 kg: 2000
- 96 kg: 2004–2012
- 98 kg: 2016
- 97 kg: 2020–present

Games	Gold	Silver	Bronze
1908 London	Richárd Weisz; Hungary	Aleksandr Petrov; Russian Empire	Søren Marinus Jensen; Denmark
1912 Stockholm	Yrjö Saarela; Finland	Johan Olin; Finland	Søren Marinus Jensen; Denmark
1920 Antwerp	Adolf Lindfors; Finland	Poul Hansen; Denmark	Martti Nieminen; Finland
1924 Paris	Henri Deglane; France	Edil Rosenqvist; Finland	Rajmund Badó; Hungary
1928 Amsterdam	Rudolf Svensson; Sweden	Hjalmar Nyström; Finland	Georg Gehring; Germany
1932 Los Angeles	Carl Westergren; Sweden	Josef Urban; Czechoslovakia	Nikolaus Hirschl; Austria
1936 Berlin	Kristjan Palusalu; Estonia	John Nyman; Sweden	Kurt Hornfischer; Germany
1948 London	Ahmet Kireççi; Turkey	Tor Nilsson; Sweden	Guido Fantoni; Italy
1952 Helsinki	Johannes Kotkas; Soviet Union	Josef Růžička; Czechoslovakia	Tauno Kovanen; Finland
1956 Melbourne	Anatoly Parfyonov; Soviet Union	Wilfried Dietrich; United Team of Germany	Adelmo Bulgarelli; Italy
1960 Rome	Ivan Bogdan; Soviet Union	Wilfried Dietrich; United Team of Germany	Bohumil Kubát; Czechoslovakia
1964 Tokyo	István Kozma; Hungary	Anatoly Roshchin; Soviet Union	Wilfried Dietrich; United Team of Germany
1968 Mexico City	István Kozma; Hungary	Anatoly Roshchin; Soviet Union	Petr Kment; Czechoslovakia
1972 Munich	Nicolae Martinescu; Romania	Nikolai Yakovenko; Soviet Union	Ferenc Kiss; Hungary
1976 Montreal	Nikolay Balboshin; Soviet Union	Kamen Goranov; Bulgaria	Andrzej Skrzydlewski; Poland
1980 Moscow	Georgi Raykov; Bulgaria	Roman Bierła; Poland	Vasile Andrei; Romania
1984 Los Angeles	Vasile Andrei; Romania	Greg Gibson; United States	Jožef Tertei; Yugoslavia
1988 Seoul	Andrzej Wroński; Poland	Gerhard Himmel; West Germany	Dennis Koslowski; United States
1992 Barcelona	Héctor Milián; Cuba	Dennis Koslowski; United States	Sergey Demyashkevich; Unified Team
1996 Atlanta	Andrzej Wroński; Poland	Sergey Lishtvan; Belarus	Mikael Ljungberg; Sweden
2000 Sydney	Mikael Ljungberg; Sweden	Davyd Saldadze; Ukraine	Garrett Lowney; United States
2004 Athens	Karam Gaber; Egypt	Ramaz Nozadze; Georgia	Mehmet Özal; Turkey
2008 Beijing	Aslanbek Khushtov; Russia	Mirko Englich; Germany	Marek Švec; Czech Republic
2008 Beijing	Aslanbek Khushtov; Russia	Mirko Englich; Germany	Adam Wheeler; United States
2012 London	Ghasem Rezaei; Iran	Rustam Totrov; Russia	Artur Aleksanyan; Armenia
2012 London	Ghasem Rezaei; Iran	Rustam Totrov; Russia	Jimmy Lidberg; Sweden
2016 Rio de Janeiro	Artur Aleksanyan; Armenia	Yasmany Lugo; Cuba	Ghasem Rezaei; Iran
2016 Rio de Janeiro	Artur Aleksanyan; Armenia	Yasmany Lugo; Cuba	Cenk İldem; Turkey
2020 Tokyo	Musa Evloev; ROC	Artur Aleksanyan; Armenia	Mohammad Hadi Saravi; Iran
2020 Tokyo	Musa Evloev; ROC	Artur Aleksanyan; Armenia	Tadeusz Michalik; Poland
2024 Paris	Mohammad Hadi Saravi; Iran	Artur Aleksanyan; Armenia	Gabriel Rosillo; Cuba
2024 Paris	Mohammad Hadi Saravi; Iran	Artur Aleksanyan; Armenia	Uzur Dzhuzupbekov; Kyrgyzstan
2028 Los Angeles			

=== Super heavyweight ===
- +100 kg: 1972–1984
- 130 kg: 1988–2000
- 120 kg: 2004–2012
- 130 kg: 2016–present

Games	Gold	Silver	Bronze
1972 Munich	Anatoly Roshchin; Soviet Union	Aleksandar Tomov; Bulgaria	Victor Dolipschi; Romania
1976 Montreal	Aleksandr Kolchinsky; Soviet Union	Aleksandar Tomov; Bulgaria	Roman Codreanu; Romania
1980 Moscow	Aleksandr Kolchinsky; Soviet Union	Aleksandar Tomov; Bulgaria	Hassan Bechara; Lebanon
1984 Los Angeles	Jeff Blatnick; United States	Refik Memišević; Yugoslavia	Victor Dolipschi; Romania
1988 Seoul	Aleksandr Karelin; Soviet Union	Rangel Gerovski; Bulgaria	Tomas Johansson; Sweden
1992 Barcelona	Aleksandr Karelin; Unified Team	Tomas Johansson; Sweden	Ioan Grigoraș; Romania
1996 Atlanta	Aleksandr Karelin; Russia	Matt Ghaffari; United States	Sergei Mureiko; Moldova
2000 Sydney	Rulon Gardner; United States	Aleksandr Karelin; Russia	Dmitry Debelka; Belarus
2004 Athens	Khasan Baroev; Russia	Georgiy Tsurtsumia; Kazakhstan	Rulon Gardner; United States
2008 Beijing	Mijaín López; Cuba	Mindaugas Mizgaitis; Lithuania	Yury Patrikeyev; Armenia
2008 Beijing	Mijaín López; Cuba	Mindaugas Mizgaitis; Lithuania	Yannick Szczepaniak; France
2012 London	Mijaín López; Cuba	Heiki Nabi; Estonia	Johan Eurén; Sweden
2012 London	Mijaín López; Cuba	Heiki Nabi; Estonia	Rıza Kayaalp; Turkey
2016 Rio de Janeiro	Mijaín López; Cuba	Rıza Kayaalp; Turkey	Sabah Shariati; Azerbaijan
2016 Rio de Janeiro	Mijaín López; Cuba	Rıza Kayaalp; Turkey	Sergey Semenov; Russia
2020 Tokyo	Mijaín López; Cuba	Iakobi Kajaia; Georgia	Sergey Semenov; ROC
2020 Tokyo	Mijaín López; Cuba	Iakobi Kajaia; Georgia	Rıza Kayaalp; Turkey
2024 Paris	Mijaín López; Cuba	Yasmani Acosta; Chile	Meng Lingzhe; China
2024 Paris	Mijaín López; Cuba	Yasmani Acosta; Chile	Amin Mirzazadeh; Iran
2028 Los Angeles			

== Discontinued events ==
=== Light flyweight ===
- 48 kg: 1972–1996

Games	Gold	Silver	Bronze
1972 Munich	Gheorghe Berceanu; Romania	Rahim Ali-Abadi; Iran	Stefan Angelov; Bulgaria
1976 Montreal	Alexei Shumakov; Soviet Union	Gheorghe Berceanu; Romania	Stefan Angelov; Bulgaria
1980 Moscow	Zhaksylyk Ushkempirov; Soviet Union	Constantin Alexandru; Romania	Ferenc Seres; Hungary
1984 Los Angeles	Vincenzo Maenza; Italy	Markus Scherer; West Germany	Ikuzo Saito; Japan
1988 Seoul	Vincenzo Maenza; Italy	Andrzej Głąb; Poland	Bratan Tzenov; Bulgaria
1992 Barcelona	Oleg Kucherenko; Unified Team	Vincenzo Maenza; Italy	Wilber Sánchez; Cuba
1996 Atlanta	Sim Kwon-ho; South Korea	Aleksandr Pavlov; Belarus	Zafar Guliev; Russia

=== Flyweight ===
- 52 kg: 1948–1996
- 54 kg: 2000

Games	Gold	Silver	Bronze
1948 London	Pietro Lombardi; Italy	Kenan Olcay; Turkey	Reino Kangasmäki; Finland
1952 Helsinki	Boris Maksovich Gurevich; Soviet Union	Ignazio Fabra; Italy	Leo Honkala; Finland
1956 Melbourne	Nikolai Solovyov; Soviet Union	Ignazio Fabra; Italy	Dursun Ali Eğribaş; Turkey
1960 Rome	Dumitru Pîrvulescu; Romania	Osman Sayed; Egypt	Mohammad Paziraei; Iran
1964 Tokyo	Tsutomu Hanahara; Japan	Angel Kerezov; Bulgaria	Dumitru Pîrvulescu; Romania
1968 Mexico City	Petar Kirov; Bulgaria	Vladimir Bakulin; Soviet Union	Miroslav Zeman; Czechoslovakia
1972 Munich	Petar Kirov; Bulgaria	Koichiro Hirayama; Japan	Giuseppe Bognanni; Italy
1976 Montreal	Vitali Konstantinov; Soviet Union	Nicu Gingă; Romania	Koichiro Hirayama; Japan
1980 Moscow	Vakhtang Blagidze; Soviet Union	Lajos Rácz; Hungary	Mladen Mladenov; Bulgaria
1984 Los Angeles	Atsuji Miyahara; Japan	Daniel Aceves; Mexico	Bang Dae-Du; South Korea
1988 Seoul	Jon Rønningen; Norway	Atsuji Miyahara; Japan	Lee Jae-Suk; South Korea
1992 Barcelona	Jon Rønningen; Norway	Alfred Ter-Mkrtchyan; Unified Team	Min Kyung-gab; South Korea
1996 Atlanta	Armen Nazaryan; Armenia	Brandon Paulson; United States	Andriy Kalashnikov; Ukraine
2000 Sydney	Sim Kwon-ho; South Korea	Lázaro Rivas; Cuba	Kang Yong-gyun; North Korea

=== Featherweight ===
- 60 kg: 1912–1920
- 62 kg: 1924–1928
- 61 kg: 1932–1960
- 63 kg: 1964–1968
- 62 kg: 1972–1996
- 63 kg: 2000
- 60 kg: 2004–2012

Games	Gold	Silver	Bronze
1912 Stockholm	Kaarlo Koskelo; Finland	Georg Gerstäcker; Germany	Otto Lasanen; Finland
1920 Antwerp	Oskari Friman; Finland	Heikki Kähkönen; Finland	Fritiof Svensson; Sweden
1924 Paris	Kalle Anttila; Finland	Aleksanteri Toivola; Finland	Eric Malmberg; Sweden
1928 Amsterdam	Voldemar Väli; Estonia	Eric Malmberg; Sweden	Gerolamo Quaglia; Italy
1932 Los Angeles	Giovanni Gozzi; Italy	Wolfgang Ehrl; Germany	Lauri Koskela; Finland
1936 Berlin	Yaşar Erkan; Turkey	Aarne Reini; Finland	Einar Karlsson; Sweden
1948 London	Mehmet Oktav; Turkey	Olle Anderberg; Sweden	Ferenc Tóth; Hungary
1952 Helsinki	Yakov Punkin; Soviet Union	Imre Polyák; Hungary	Abdel Aaal Rashed; Egypt
1956 Melbourne	Rauno Mäkinen; Finland	Imre Polyák; Hungary	Roman Dzeneladze; Soviet Union
1960 Rome	Müzahir Sille; Turkey	Imre Polyák; Hungary	Konstantin Vyrupayev; Soviet Union
1964 Tokyo	Imre Polyák; Hungary	Roman Rurua; Soviet Union	Branislav Martinović; Yugoslavia
1968 Mexico City	Roman Rurua; Soviet Union	Hideo Fujimoto; Japan	Simion Popescu; Romania
1972 Munich	Georgi Markov; Bulgaria	Heinz-Helmut Wehling; East Germany	Kazimierz Lipień; Poland
1976 Montreal	Kazimierz Lipień; Poland	Nelson Davydyan; Soviet Union	László Réczi; Hungary
1980 Moscow	Stelios Mygiakis; Greece	István Tóth; Hungary	Boris Kramorenko; Soviet Union
1984 Los Angeles	Kim Weon-Kee; South Korea	Kent-Olle Johansson; Sweden	Hugo Dietsche; Switzerland
1988 Seoul	Kamandar Madzhidov; Soviet Union	Zhivko Vangelov; Bulgaria	An Dae-Hyun; South Korea
1992 Barcelona	Mehmet Akif Pirim; Turkey	Sergey Martynov; Unified Team	Juan Marén; Cuba
1996 Atlanta	Włodzimierz Zawadzki; Poland	Juan Marén; Cuba	Mehmet Akif Pirim; Turkey
2000 Sydney	Varteres Samurgashev; Russia	Juan Marén; Cuba	Akaki Chachua; Georgia
2004 Athens	Jung Ji-hyun; South Korea	Roberto Monzón; Cuba	Armen Nazaryan; Bulgaria
2008 Beijing	Islambek Albiev; Russia	Nurbakyt Tengizbayev; Kazakhstan	Sheng Jiang; China
2008 Beijing	Islambek Albiev; Russia	Nurbakyt Tengizbayev; Kazakhstan	Ruslan Tyumenbayev; Kyrgyzstan
2012 London	Omid Norouzi; Iran	Revaz Lashkhi; Georgia	Ryutaro Matsumoto; Japan
2012 London	Omid Norouzi; Iran	Revaz Lashkhi; Georgia	Zaur Kuramagomedov; Russia

=== Light heavyweight ===
- 93 kg: 1908
- 82.5 kg: 1912–1928
- 87 kg: 1932–1960
- 97 kg: 1964–1968
- 90 kg: 1972–1996

Games	Gold	Silver	Bronze
1908 London	Verner Weckman; Finland	Yrjö Saarela; Finland	Carl Jensen; Denmark
1912 Stockholm	none awarded	Anders Ahlgren; Sweden; Ivar Böhling; Finland	Béla Varga; Hungary
1920 Antwerp	Claes Johansson; Sweden	Edil Rosenqvist; Finland	Johannes Eriksen; Denmark
1924 Paris	Carl Westergren; Sweden	Rudolf Svensson; Sweden	Onni Pellinen; Finland
1928 Amsterdam	Ibrahim Moustafa; Egypt	Adolf Rieger; Germany	Onni Pellinen; Finland
1932 Los Angeles	Rudolf Svensson; Sweden	Onni Pellinen; Finland	Mario Gruppioni; Italy
1936 Berlin	Axel Cadier; Sweden	Edwins Bietags; Latvia	August Neo; Estonia
1948 London	Karl-Erik Nilsson; Sweden	Kelpo Gröndahl; Finland	Ibrahim Orabi; Egypt
1952 Helsinki	Kelpo Gröndahl; Finland	Shalva Chikhladze; Soviet Union	Karl-Erik Nilsson; Sweden
1956 Melbourne	Valentin Nikolayev; Soviet Union	Petko Sirakov; Bulgaria	Karl-Erik Nilsson; Sweden
1960 Rome	Tevfik Kış; Turkey	Krali Bimbalov; Bulgaria	Givi Kartoziya; Soviet Union
1964 Tokyo	Boyan Radev; Bulgaria	Per Svensson; Sweden	Heinz Kiehl; United Team of Germany
1968 Mexico City	Boyan Radev; Bulgaria	Nikolai Yakovenko; Soviet Union	Nicolae Martinescu; Romania
1972 Munich	Valery Rezantsev; Soviet Union	Josip Čorak; Yugoslavia	Czesław Kwieciński; Poland
1976 Montreal	Valery Rezantsev; Soviet Union	Stoyan Ivanov; Bulgaria	Czesław Kwieciński; Poland
1980 Moscow	Norbert Növényi; Hungary	Igor Kanygin; Soviet Union	Petre Dicu; Romania
1984 Los Angeles	Steve Fraser; United States	Ilie Matei; Romania	Frank Andersson; Sweden
1988 Seoul	Atanas Komchev; Bulgaria	Harri Koskela; Finland	Vladimir Popov; Soviet Union
1992 Barcelona	Maik Bullmann; Germany	Hakkı Başar; Turkey	Gogi Koguashvili; Unified Team
1996 Atlanta	Vyacheslav Oliynyk; Ukraine	Jacek Fafiński; Poland	Maik Bullmann; Germany

=== Openweight ===
Games	Gold	Silver	Bronze
1896 Athens	Carl Schuhmann; Germany	Georgios Tsitas; Greece	Stephanos Christopoulos; Greece

== See also ==
- Wrestling at the 1906 Intercalated Games — these Intercalated Games are no longer regarded as official Games by the International Olympic Committee
- List of World and Olympic Champions in Greco-Roman wrestling
