= Wrestling at the 1924 Summer Olympics – Men's Greco-Roman featherweight =

Wrestling at the Olympics

Men's featherweight Greco-Roman wrestling at the Games of the VIII Olympiad
- Venue: Vélodrome d'Hiver
- Dates: July 6–10, 1924
- Competitors: 27 from 15 nations

Medalists
1st place, gold medalist(s)		Kalle Anttila	Finland
2nd place, silver medalist(s)		Aleksanteri Toivola	Finland
3rd place, bronze medalist(s)		Erik Malmberg	Sweden

The men's Greco-Roman featherweight was a Greco-Roman wrestling event held as part of the Wrestling at the 1924 Summer Olympics programme. It was the third appearance of the event. Featherweight was the second-lightest category, including wrestlers weighing 58 to 62 kilograms.

== Results ==
Source: Official results; Wudarski

The tournament was double-elimination.

=== First round ===
Losses	Winner	Loser	Losses
0	Arthur Nord (NOR)	Ödön Radvány (HUN)	1
0	František Řezáč (TCH)	Hillair Fettes (LUX)	1
0	Voldemar Väli (EST)	Édouard Rottiers (BEL)	1
0	Katsutoshi Naito (JPN)	Jordán Vallmajo (ESP)	1
0	Josef Penczik (AUT)	Domingo Sánchez (ESP)	1
0	Marcel Capron (FRA)	Lucien Bottin (BEL)	1
0	Erik Malmberg (SWE)	Enrico Porro (ITA)	1
0	Karl Mezulian (AUT)	Jānis Rudzītis (LAT)	1
0	Aleksander Toivola (FIN)	Søren Eriksen (DEN)	1
0	František Dyršmíd (TCH)	Gerolamo Quaglia (ITA)	1
0	Kalle Anttila (FIN)	Rasmus Torgensen (DEN)	1
0	Osvald Käpp (EST)	René Rottenfluc (FRA)	1
0	Konrad Svensson (SWE)	Jenő Németh (HUN)	1
0	Martin Egeberg (NOR)	Bye	–

=== Second round ===
Losses	Winner	Loser	Losses
1	Ödön Radvány (HUN)	Martin Egeberg (NOR)	1
0	Arthur Nord (NOR)	František Řezáč (TCH)	1
1	Édouard Rottiers (BEL)	Hilair Fettes (LUX)	2
0	Voldemar Väli (EST)	Jordán Vallmajo (ESP)	2
0	Katsutoshi Naito (JPN)	Domingo Sánchez (ESP)	2
0	Maurice Capron (FRA)	Enrico Porro (ITA)	2
0	Erik Malmberg (SWE)	Lucien Bottin (BEL)	2
0	Aleksander Toivola (FIN)	Karl Mezulian (AUT)	1
1	Søren Eriksen (DEN)	Jānis Rudzits (LAT)	2
0	Kalle Anttila (FIN)	František Dyršmid (TCH)	1
1	Rasmus Torgensen (DEN)	Gerolamo Quaglia (ITA)	2
0	Osvald Käpp (EST)	Jenő Németh (HUN)	2
0	Konrad Svensson (SWE)	René Rottenfluc (FRA)	2
–	Abandoned	Josef Penczik (AUT)	–

=== Third round ===
Losses	Winner	Loser	Losses
1	Ödön Radvány (HUN)	Édouard Rottiers (BEL)	2
1	Martin Egeberg (NOR)	František Řezáč (TCH)	2
0	Arthur Nord (NOR)	Voldemar Väli (EST)	1
0	Maurice Capron (FRA)	Katsutoshi Naito (JPN)	1
0	Erik Malmberg (SWE)	Karl Mezulian (AUT)	2
0	Aleksander Toivola (FIN)	František Dyršmid (TCH)	2
0	Kalle Anttila (FIN)	Søren Eriksen (DEN)	2
1	Rasmus Torgensen (DEN)	Osvald Käpp (EST)	1
0	Konrad Svensson (SWE)	Bye	–

=== Fourth round ===
Losses	Winner	Loser	Losses
1	Ödön Radvány (HUN)	Voldemar Väli (EST)	2
0	Konrad Svensson (SWE)	Martin Egeberg (NOR)	2
0	Arthur Nord (NOR)	Katsutoshi Naito (JPN)	2
0	Erik Malmberg (SWE)	Maurice Capron (FRA)	1
0	Aleksander Toivola (FIN)	Rasmus Torgensen (DEN)	2
0	Kalle Anttila (FIN)	Osvald Käpp (EST)	2

=== Fifth round ===
Losses	Winner	Loser	Losses
0	Erik Malmberg (SWE)	Ödön Radvány (HUN)	2
0	Aleksander Toivola (FIN)	Konrad Svensson (SWE)	1
0	Arthur Nord (NOR)	Maurice Capron (FRA)	2
0	Kalle Anttila (FIN)	Bye	–

=== Sixth round ===
Losses	Winner	Loser	Losses
0	Erik Malmberg (SWE)	Arthur Nord (NOR)	1
0	Kalle Anttila (FIN)	Konrad Svensson (SWE)	2
0	Aleksander Toivola (FIN)	Bye	–

=== Seventh round ===
This round left only two undefeated wrestlers, who advanced to the eighth round. Nord, with his second loss, finished fourth. Malmberg, taking his first loss in the seventh round, finished with the bronze medal.

Losses	Winner	Loser	Losses
0	Aleksander Toivola (FIN)	Erik Malmberg (SWE)	1
0	Kalle Anttila (FIN)	Arthur Nord (NOR)	2

=== Eighth round ===
Anttila defeated Toivola for the gold medal.

Losses	Winner	Loser	Losses
0	Kalle Anttila (FIN)	Aleksander Toivola (FIN)	1
