= Japan at the 1924 Summer Olympics =

- IOC code: JPN
- NOC: Japanese Olympic Committee

in Paris
- Competitors: 19 in 4 sports
- Medals Ranked 23rd: Gold 0 Silver 0 Bronze 1 Total 1

Summer Olympics appearances (overview)
- 1912; 1920; 1924; 1928; 1932; 1936; 1948; 1952; 1956; 1960; 1964; 1968; 1972; 1976; 1980; 1984; 1988; 1992; 1996; 2000; 2004; 2008; 2012; 2016; 2020; 2024; 2028

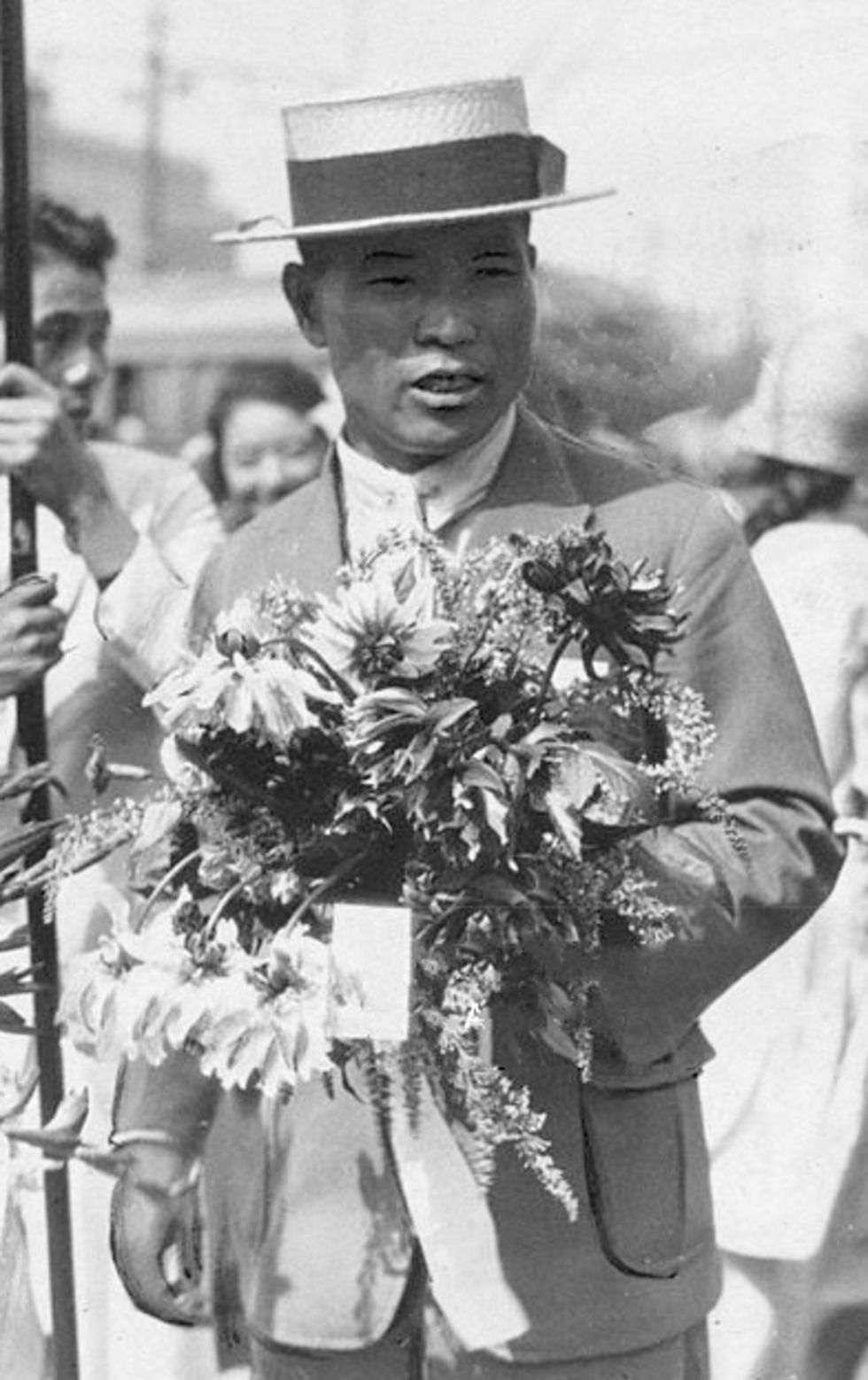
Shiso Kanaguri arriving at Kobe port after 1924 Olympics

The Empire of Japan competed at the 1924 Summer Olympics in Paris, France.

== Background ==
Japan secured its first Olympic medals in the 1920 Summer Olympics in Antwerp, Belgium; however, suffered from severe embarrassment when it found its Olympic team stranded in Belgium without the funds necessary to return home. The weaknesses of the Japan Amateur Athletic Association, which sponsored the team, exposed, the Japanese government agreed to subsidize future Olympic participation. Other preparation on a national level included the designation of November 3 as "National Fitness Day" with games held at the athletic grounds of Meiji Shrine in Tokyo.

For the 1924 Olympics, Japan fielded a team of 28 athletes, who competed in four events. The team was equipped by Mizuno Corp., which later became one of the world's leading sportswear and equipment manufacturers.

== Medalists ==
Medal	Name	Sport	Event	Date
Bronze	Katsutoshi Naito	Wrestling	Men's freestyle featherweight	July 14

Medals by sport
Sport	1st place, gold medalist(s)	2nd place, silver medalist(s)	3rd place, bronze medalist(s)	Total
Wrestling	0	0	1	1
Total	0	0	1	1

== Aquatics ==
=== Swimming ===
Ranks given are within the heat.

Men

Swimmer	Event	Heats		Semifinals		Final	
Swimmer	Event	Result	Rank	Result	Rank	Result	Rank
Tsunenobu Ishida	100 m backstroke	1:26.0	4	did not advance			
Tsunenobu Ishida	200 m breaststroke	3:09.2	4	did not advance			
Torahiko Miyahata	100 m freestyle	1:04.2	3 q	DNS	—	did not advance	
Kazuo Noda	400 m freestyle	5:43.8	3	did not advance			
Kazuo Noda	1500 m freestyle	23:44.2	3	did not advance			
Kazuo Onoda	100 m freestyle	1:05.4	3	did not advance			
Kazuo Onoda	1500 m freestyle	DNF	—	did not advance			
Giyo Saito	100 m backstroke	1:20.2	2 Q	1:19.8	4	did not advance	
Katsuo Takaishi	100 m freestyle	1:04.0	1 Q	1:02.4	3 q	1:03.0	5
Katsuo Takaishi	1500 m freestyle	22:43.2	2 Q	21:48.6	2 Q	22:10.4	5
Torahiko Miyahata; Kazuo Noda; Kazuo Onoda; Katsuo Takaishi	4 × 200 m freestyle relay	10:24.2	2 Q	10:12.4	3 q	10:15.2	4

== Athletics ==
Eight athletes represented Japan in 1924. It was the nation's third appearance in the sport as well as the Games.

Ranks given are within the heat.

Athlete	Event	Heats		Quarterfinals		Semifinals		Final	
Athlete	Event	Result	Rank	Result	Rank	Result	Rank	Result	Rank
Shizo Kanakuri	Marathon	N/A						did not finish	
Yahei Miura	Marathon	N/A						did not finish	
Tokushige Noto	400 m	51.7	2 Q	50.7	5	did not advance			
Tokushige Noto	800 m	N/A		Unknown	4	did not advance			
Tokushige Noto	Decathlon	N/A						5248.330	22
Mikio Oda	Long jump	N/A				6.83	3	did not advance	
Mikio Oda	Triple jump	N/A				14.35	3 Q	14.35	6
Mikio Oda	High jump	N/A				1.80	4	did not advance	
Katsuo Okazaki	5000 m	N/A				15:22.2	2 Q	Did not finish	12
Sasago Tani	100 m	Unknown	3	did not advance					
Sasago Tani	200 m	Unknown	2 Q	Unknown	3	did not advance			
Kikunosuke Tashiro	Marathon	N/A						did not finish	
Seiichi Ueda	Pentathlon	N/A						Elim-3	

== Tennis ==
Men

Athlete	Event	Round of 128	Round of 64	Round of 32	Round of 16	Quarterfinals	Semifinals	Final	
Athlete	Event	Opposition Score	Opposition Score	Opposition Score	Opposition Score	Opposition Score	Opposition Score	Opposition Score	Rank
Masanosuke Fukuda	Singles	Bye	Wheatley (GBR); W 6–2, 6–4, 6–3	Timmer (NED); W 8–6, 6–4, 5–7, 6–4	Cochet (FRA); L 2–6, 1–6, 3–6	did not advance			
Takeichi Harada	Singles	Bye	Žemla (TCH); W 6–3, 3–6, 6–2, 6–2	Cousin (FRA); W Retired	Gilbert (GBR); W 10–8, 2–6, 11–9, 6–2	de Morpurgo (ITA); L 4–6, 1–6, 1–6	did not advance		
Asaji Honda	Singles	Borotra (FRA); L 3–6, 3–6, 5–7	did not advance						
Sunao Okamoto	Singles	Bye	Koželuh (TCH); L 6–4, 5–7, 8–10, 6–4, 4–6	did not advance					
Masanosuke Fukuda; Asaji Honda	Doubles	—N/a	van Lennep / Timmer (NED); W 6–4, 1–6, 6–3, 1–6, 6–2	Flaquer / Saprisa (ESP); L 2–6, 3–6, 3–6	did not advance				
Takeichi Harada; Sunao Okamoto	Doubles	—N/a	Thalbitzer / Bache (DEN); W 6–0, 6–0, 6–1	J. Alonso / M. Alonso (ESP); L 4–6, 6–4, 4–6, 4–6	did not advance				

== Wrestling ==
=== Freestyle wrestling ===
Men's

Athlete	Event	Round of 32	Round of 16	Quarterfinal	Semifinal	Final	
Athlete	Event	Opposition Result	Opposition Result	Opposition Result	Opposition Result	Opposition Result	Rank
Katsutoshi Naito	Featherweight	Bye	Foubert (BEL); W	Reed (USA); L	Silver medal semifinal Chilcott (CAN); W Bronze medal semifinal Huupponen (FIN); W	Silver medal final Newton (USA); L Bronze medal final Hansson (SWE); W	3rd place, bronze medalist(s)

=== Greco-Roman ===
Men's

Athlete	Event	First round	Second round	Third round	Fourth round	Fifth round	Sixth round	Seventh round	Eighth round	Rank
Athlete	Event	Opposition Result	Opposition Result	Opposition Result	Opposition Result	Opposition Result	Opposition Result	Opposition Result	Opposition Result	Rank
Katsutoshi Naito	Featherweight	Vallmajo (ESP); W	Sánchez (ESP); W	Capron (FRA); L	Nord (NOR); L	did not advance				=8
