= 1921 World Wrestling Championships =

- Host city: Helsinki, Finland
- Dates: 5–8 November 1921

The 1921 World Greco-Roman Wrestling Championship were held in Helsinki, Finland. This is the first official World Championships, after the creation of the International Amateur Wrestling Federation.

== Medal table ==
Rank	Nation	Gold	Silver	Bronze	Total
1	Finland	6	4	3	13
2	Sweden	0	1	1	2
3	Latvia	0	1	0	1
4	Denmark	0	0	1	1
4	Netherlands	0	0	1	1
Totals (5 entries)		6	6	6	18

== Medal summary ==
Event	Gold	Silver	Bronze
Bantamweight; 58 kg	Väinö Ikonen; Finland	Kaarlo Mäkinen; Finland	Risto Mustonen; Finland
Featherweight; 62 kg	Kalle Anttila; Finland	Aleksanteri Toivola; Finland	Erik Malmberg; Sweden
Lightweight; 67.5 kg	Oskari Friman; Finland	Rūdolfs Ronis; Latvia	Juho Ikävalko; Finland
Middleweight; 75 kg	Taavi Tamminen; Finland	Volmar Wikström; Finland	Edvard Westerlund; Finland
Light heavyweight 82.5 kg	Edil Rosenqvist; Finland	Rudolf Svensson; Sweden	Jan Muijs; Netherlands
Heavyweight +82.5 kg	Johan Salila; Finland	Martti Nieminen; Finland	Emil Larsen; Denmark
