= 1922 World Wrestling Championships =

- Host city: Stockholm, Sweden
- Dates: 8–11 March 1922

The 1922 World Greco-Roman Wrestling Championship were held in Stockholm, Sweden.

== Medal table ==
Rank	Nation	Gold	Silver	Bronze	Total
1	Sweden	3	2	0	5
2	Finland	3	0	2	5
3	Norway	0	2	1	3
4	Estonia	0	1	0	1
4	Hungary	0	1	0	1
6	Denmark	0	0	3	3
Totals (6 entries)		6	6	6	18

== Medal summary ==
Event	Gold	Silver	Bronze
Bantamweight; 58 kg	Fritiof Svensson; Sweden	Eduard Pütsep; Estonia	Kaarlo Mäkinen; Finland
Featherweight; 62 kg	Kalle Anttila; Finland	Martin Egeberg; Norway	Otto Boesen; Denmark
Lightweight; 67.5 kg	Edvard Westerlund; Finland	Ödön Radvány; Hungary	Birger Nilsen; Norway
Middleweight; 75 kg	Carl Westergren; Sweden	Einar Pettersen; Norway	Charles Frisenfeldt; Denmark
Light heavyweight 82.5 kg	Edil Rosenqvist; Finland	Rudolf Svensson; Sweden	Svend Nielsen; Denmark
Heavyweight +82.5 kg	Ernst Nilsson; Sweden	Anders Ahlgren; Sweden	Toivo Pohjala; Finland
