= Wrestling at the 1924 Summer Olympics =

Wrestling at the Games of the VIII Olympiad
- Venue: Vélodrome d'Hiver
- Dates: 6–14 July 1924
- No. of events: 13 (13 men, 0 women)
- Competitors: 229 from 26 nations

At the 1924 Summer Olympics thirteen wrestling events were contested, all for men. There were six weight classes in Greco-Roman wrestling and seven classes in freestyle wrestling. The Greco-Roman events were held from 6 to 10 July 1924 and the freestyle competitions from 11 to 14 July 1924.

== Medal summary ==
=== Freestyle ===
Games	Gold	Silver	Bronze
Bantamweight	Kustaa Pihlajamäki; Finland	Kaarlo Mäkinen; Finland	Bryan Hines; United States
Featherweight	Robin Reed; United States	Chester Newton; United States	Katsutoshi Naito; Japan
Lightweight	Russell Vis; United States	Volmar Wikström; Finland	Arvo Haavisto; Finland
Welterweight	Hermann Gehri; Switzerland	Eino Leino; Finland	Otto Müller; Switzerland
Middleweight	Fritz Hagmann; Switzerland	Pierre Ollivier; Belgium	Vilho Pekkala; Finland
Light Heavyweight	John Spellman; United States	Rudolf Svensson; Sweden	Charles Courant; Switzerland
Heavyweight	Harry Steel; United States	Henri Wernli; Switzerland	Archie MacDonald; Great Britain

=== Greco-Roman ===
Games	Gold	Silver	Bronze
Bantamweight	Eduard Pütsep; Estonia	Anselm Ahlfors; Finland	Väinö Ikonen; Finland
Featherweight	Kalle Anttila; Finland	Aleksanteri Toivola; Finland	Eric Malmberg; Sweden
Lightweight	Oskari Friman; Finland	Lajos Keresztes; Hungary	Källe Westerlund; Finland
Middleweight	Edvard Westerlund; Finland	Arthur Lindfors; Finland	Roman Steinberg; Estonia
Light Heavyweight	Carl Westergren; Sweden	Rudolf Svensson; Sweden	Onni Pellinen; Finland
Heavyweight	Henri Deglane; France	Edil Rosenqvist; Finland	Rajmund Badó; Hungary

== Participating nations ==
A total of 229 wrestlers from 26 nations competed at the Paris Games.

- Australia (1)
- Austria (8)
- Belgium (17)
- Canada (5)
- Czechoslovakia (9)
- Denmark (11)
- Egypt (2)
- Estonia (8)
- Finland (24)
- France (23)
- Great Britain (14)
- Greece (2)
- Hungary (12)
- Italy (17)
- Japan (1)
- Latvia (6)
- Luxembourg (2)
- Netherlands (8)
- Norway (7)
- Poland (2)
- Spain (4)
- Sweden (13)
- Switzerland (12)
- Turkey (5)
- United States (14)
- Yugoslavia (2)

== Medal table ==
Rank	Nation	Gold	Silver	Bronze	Total
1	Finland	4	7	5	16
2	United States	4	1	1	6
3	Switzerland	2	1	2	5
4	Sweden	1	2	1	4
5	Estonia	1	0	1	2
6	France	1	0	0	1
7	Hungary	0	1	1	2
8	Belgium	0	1	0	1
9	Great Britain	0	0	1	1
9	Japan	0	0	1	1
Totals (10 entries)		13	13	13	39
