= František Řezáč =

František Řezáč can refer to:

- František Řezáč (cyclist) (born 1943), Czech Olympic cyclist
- František Řezáč (wrestler) (born 1898), Czech Olympic wrestler
