= Domingo Sánchez (wrestler) =

Spanish wrestler

- Born: 18 January 1899; Teruel, Spain
- Died: 13 October 1961 (aged 62); Barcelona, Spain

Domingo Sánchez (18 January 1899 – 13 October 1961) was a Spanish wrestler. He competed in the Greco-Roman featherweight event at the 1924 Summer Olympics.

In Olympic competition, he faced Josef Penczik of Austria in the first round, losing by fall after 45 seconds. In the second round he faced Katsutoshi "Tiger" Naito of Japan, a bronze medalist in freestyle. The match lasted for 55 minutes before Sánchez lost by a fall. The second match eliminated him from competition.
