= Hillair Fettes =

Luxembourgish wrestler

- Born: 1 March 1898
- Died: 31 December 1971 (aged 73)

Hillair Fettes (1 March 1898 – 31 December 1971) was a Luxembourgish wrestler. He competed in the Greco-Roman featherweight event at the 1924 Summer Olympics.
