= Édouard Rottiers =

Belgian wrestler

- Born: 1898

Édouard Rottiers (born 1898, date of death unknown) was a Belgian wrestler. He competed in the Greco-Roman featherweight event at the 1924 Summer Olympics.
