= Mikko Hämäläinen =

Finnish gymnast

- Born: 29 September 1891 Mikkeli, Grand Duchy of Finland, Russian Empire
- Died: 22 August 1965 (aged 73) Mikkeli, Finland

Gymnastics career
- Discipline: Men's artistic gymnastics
- Country represented: Finland

Mikko Hämäläinen (29 September 1891 – 22 August 1965) was a Finnish gymnast. He competed in nine events at the 1924 Summer Olympics.
