= Akseli Roine =

Finnish gymnast

- Full name: Aksel Nikolai Roine
- Born: 11 March 1896 Maaria, Grand Duchy of Finland, Russian Empire
- Died: 26 January 1944 (aged 47) Kontiolahti, Finland
- Relatives: Aarne Roine (brother)

Gymnastics career
- Discipline: Men's artistic gymnastics
- Country represented: Finland

Aksel Nikolai "Akseli" Roine (11 March 1896 – 26 January 1944) was a Finnish gymnast. He competed in nine events at the 1924 Summer Olympics.
