= Vilho Pekkala =

Finnish wrestler (1898–1974)

- Born: 3 April 1898; Kotka, Finland
- Died: 20 October 1974 (aged 76); Kotka, Finland

Vilho Pekkala
Medal record

Men's freestyle wrestling

Representing Finland

Olympic Games
Bronze medal – third place	1924 Paris	Middleweight

Vilho Pekkala (3 April 1898 – 20 October 1974) was a Finnish wrestler and Olympic medalist.

He won a bronze medal in freestyle wrestling at the 1924 Summer Olympics in Paris.
