= Arvo Haavisto =

Finnish wrestler (1900–1977)

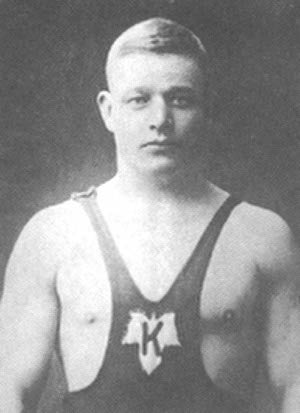

Personal information
- Born: 7 January 1900 Ilmajoki, Grand Duchy of Finland, Russian Empire
- Died: 22 April 1977 (aged 77) Ilmajoki, Finland
- Height: 172 cm (5 ft 8 in)
- Weight: 66–74 kg (146–163 lb)

Sport
- Sport: Freestyle wrestling
- Club: Ilmajoen Kisailijat
Medal record
Men's freestyle wrestling
Representing Finland
Olympic Games
Gold medal – first place	1928 Amsterdam	Welterweight
Bronze medal – third place	1924 Paris	Lightweight

Arvo Jaakko Haavisto (7 January 1900 – 22 April 1977) was a Finnish wrestler. He won a bronze medal at the 1924 Olympics and a gold medal in 1928, both in freestyle wrestling.

Haavisto took up wrestling in 1918 and won four Finnish titles: in 1925–1927 in freestyle and in 1925 in Greco-Roman wrestling. After retiring from competitions he worked as a wrestling coach and referee, attending the 1936 Olympics in this capacity. Since 1992 an annual Greco-Roman wrestling tournament has been held in his honor in his native Ilmajoki.
