= Antti Valkama =

Finnish sports shooter (1889–1974)

Personal information
- Born: 31 July 1889 Mäntsälä, Finland
- Died: 26 July 1974 (aged 84) Suomu, Finland

Sport
- Sport: Sports shooting

Antti Valkama (31 July 1889 – 26 July 1974) was a Finnish sports shooter. He competed in three events at the 1924 Summer Olympics.
