= Aarne Roine =

Finnish gymnast

- Full name: Aarne Alexander Roine
- Born: 10 November 1893 Perniö, Grand Duchy of Finland, Russian Empire
- Died: 13 May 1938 (aged 44) Valamo Archipelago, Finland
- Relatives: Akseli Roine (brother)

Gymnastics career
- Discipline: Men's artistic gymnastics
- Country represented: Finland

Aarne Alexander Roine (10 November 1893 – 13 May 1938) was a Finnish gymnast. He competed in nine events at the 1924 Summer Olympics.
