= Otto Suhonen =

Finnish gymnast

- Full name: Otto Armas Suhonen
- Born: 8 June 1895 Uurainen, Grand Duchy of Finland, Russian Empire
- Died: 19 August 1954 (aged 59) Helsinki, Finland

Gymnastics career
- Discipline: Men's artistic gymnastics
- Country represented: Finland

Otto Armas Suhonen (8 June 1895 – 19 August 1954) was a Finnish gymnast. He competed in nine events at the 1924 Summer Olympics.
