= Josef Penczik =

Austrian wrestler

- Born: 2 May 1904
- Died: 9 September 1974 (aged 70)

Josef Penczik (2 May 1904 – 9 September 1974) was an Austrian wrestler. He competed in the Greco-Roman featherweight event at the 1924 Summer Olympics.
