= Eetu Kostamo =

Finnish gymnast

- Full name: Edvard Kostamo
- Born: 9 December 1893 Heinjoki, Grand Duchy of Finland, Russian Empire
- Died: 26 March 1971 (aged 77) Lappeenranta, Finland

Gymnastics career
- Discipline: Men's artistic gymnastics
- Country represented: Finland

Edvard "Eetu" Kostamo (9 December 1893 – 26 March 1971) was a Finnish gymnast. He competed in nine events at the 1924 Summer Olympics.
