= Lucien Bottin =

Belgian wrestler (1881–1961)

- Born: 6 April 1881
- Died: 3 November 1961 (aged 80)

Lucien Bottin (6 April 1881 – 3 November 1961) was a Belgian wrestler. He competed in the Greco-Roman featherweight event at the 1924 Summer Olympics.
