= Pierre Ollivier =

Belgian wrestler

Medal record

Men's freestyle wrestling

Representing Belgium

Olympic Games
Silver medal – second place	1924 Paris	Middleweight

Pierre Ollivier (born 1890, death date unknown) was a Belgian wrestler. He was Olympic silver medalist in freestyle wrestling in 1924.
