= Jordán Vallmajo =

Spanish wrestler

- Born: 14 May 1894; Girona, Spain
- Died: 22 August 1983 (aged 89); Barcelona, Spain

Jordán Vallmajo (14 May 1894 – 22 August 1983) was a Spanish wrestler. He competed in the Greco-Roman featherweight event at the 1924 Summer Olympics.
