= Søren Eriksen =

Danish wrestler (1893–1968)

- Born: 19 May 1893; Aarhus, Denmark
- Died: 23 September 1968 (aged 75)

Søren Eriksen (19 May 1893 – 23 September 1968) was a Danish wrestler. He competed in the freestyle lightweight and the Greco-Roman featherweight events at the 1924 Summer Olympics.
