= František Dyršmíd =

Czech wrestler

- Born: 1901
- Died: 1971 (aged 69–70)

František Dyršmíd (1901 – August 1971) was a Czech wrestler. He competed in the Greco-Roman featherweight event at the 1924 Summer Olympics.
