= Väinö Karonen =

Finnish gymnast

- Full name: Väinö Aleksander Karonen
- Born: 1 May 1898 Viipuri, Grand Duchy of Finland, Russian Empire
- Died: 2 June 1972 (aged 74) Jaala, Finland

Gymnastics career
- Discipline: Men's artistic gymnastics
- Country represented: Finland

Väinö Aleksander Karonen (1 May 1898 – 2 June 1972) was a Finnish gymnast. He competed in nine events at the 1924 Summer Olympics.
