= Jenő Németh =

Hungarian wrestler

- Born: 1902; Budapest, Hungary

Jenő Németh (born 1902, date of death unknown) was a Hungarian wrestler. He competed in the Greco-Roman featherweight event at the 1924 Summer Olympics.
