= Lajos Keresztes =

Hungarian wrestler (1900–1978)

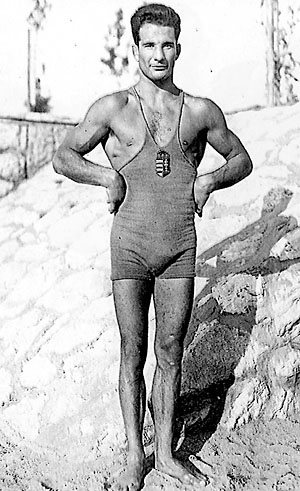

Personal information
- Born: 30 April 1900 Ocna Mureș, Romania
- Died: 9 August 1978 (aged 78) Budapest, Hungary
Medal record
Men's Greco-Roman wrestling
Representing Hungary
Olympic Games
Gold medal – first place	1928 Amsterdam	Lightweight
Silver medal – second place	1924 Paris	Lightweight

Lajos Keresztes (30 April 1900 – 9 August 1978) was a Hungarian wrestler and Olympic champion in Greco-Roman wrestling.

== Olympics ==
Keresztes competed at the 1924 Summer Olympics in Paris where he won a silver medal in Greco-Roman wrestling, the lightweight class. He won a gold medal at the 1928 Summer Olympics in Amsterdam.
