= František Řezáč (wrestler) =

Czech wrestler

- Born: 8 January 1894

František Řezáč (born 8 January 1894, date of death unknown) was a Czech wrestler. He competed at the 1920 and 1924 Summer Olympics.
