= Kaarlo Mäkinen =

Finnish wrestler (1892–1980)

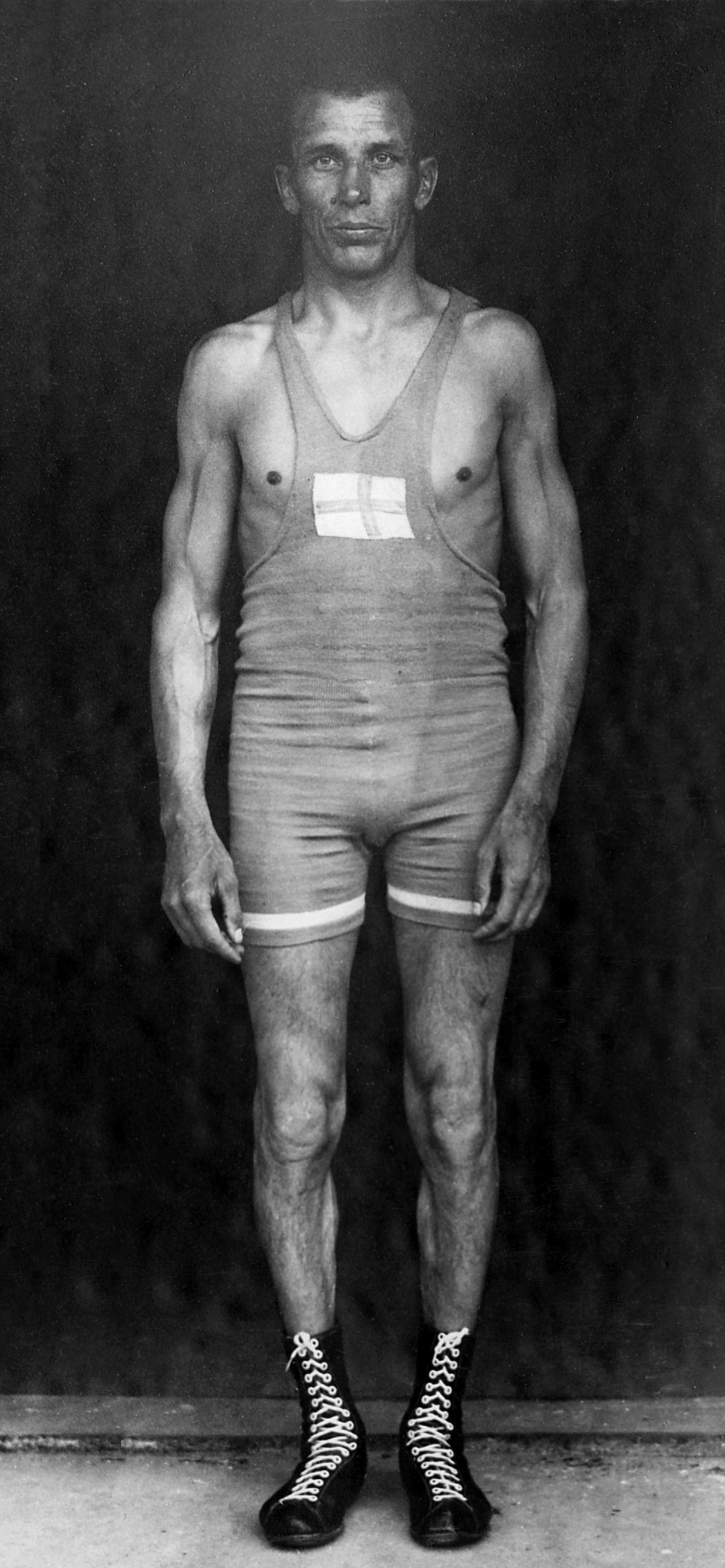
- Kaarlo Edvin Makinen at the 1928 Olympics

Personal information
- Born: 14 May 1892 Mariehamn, Åland, Grand Duchy of Finland, Russian Empire
- Died: 11 May 1980 (aged 87) Turku, Finland

Sport
- Sport: Wrestling
- Club: Turun Riento; Turun Voimamiehet
Medal record
Representing Finland
Men's freestyle wrestling
Olympic Games
Gold medal – first place	1928 Amsterdam	Bantamweight
Silver medal – second place	1924 Paris	Bantamweight
Men's Greco-Roman wrestling
World Championships
Silver medal – second place	1921 Helsinki	Bantamweight
Bronze medal – third place	1922 Stockholm	Bantamweight

Kaarlo Mäkinen (14 May 1892 – 11 May 1980) was a Finnish wrestler who competed at the 1920, 1924 and 1928 Olympics in freestyle wrestling. In 1920 he was eliminated in the preliminary round in the featherweight event. After that he moved to the bantamweight category and won a silver and a gold medal in 1924 and 1928, respectively. He also won two medals in Greco-Roman wrestling at the world championships of 1921 and 1922, as well as four national titles: three in Greco-Roman (1921–1923) and one in freestyle wrestling (1928).
