= Bryan Hines =

American wrestler (1896–1964)

Personal information
- Born: May 14, 1896 Morehead, Kentucky, U.S.
- Died: September 10, 1964 (aged 68) Flagstaff, Arizona, U.S.

Sport
- Country: United States
- Sport: Wrestling
- Events: Freestyle and Folkstyle
- College team: Northwestern
- Team: USA
Medal record
Men's freestyle wrestling
Representing the United States
Olympic Games
Bronze medal – third place	1924 Paris	56 kg

Bryan Hines (May 14, 1896 – September 10, 1964) was an American wrestler and Olympic medalist. He competed at the 1924 Olympic Games in Paris, where he won a bronze medal in the freestyle wrestling bantamweight division.
