= Arthur Lindfors =

Finnish wrestler (1893–1977)

- Born: 17 March 1893; Porvoo, Finland
- Died: 21 September 1977 (aged 84); Porvoo, Finland
Medal record
Men's Greco-Roman wrestling
Representing Finland
Olympic Games
Silver medal – second place	1920 Antwerp	Middleweight
Silver medal – second place	1924 Paris	Middleweight

Arthur Richard Lindfors (17 March 1893 – 21 September 1977) was a Finnish wrestler and Olympic medalist in Greco-Roman wrestling.

== Olympics ==
Lindfors competed at the 1920 Summer Olympics in Antwerp where he received a silver medal in Greco-Roman wrestling, the middleweight class. He received a second silver medal at the 1924 Summer Olympics in Paris.
