= Marcel Capron =

French wrestler

- Born: 26 April 1900; Paris, France
- Died: 26 October 1981 (aged 81)

Marcel Capron (26 April 1900 – 26 October 1981) was a French wrestler. He competed in the Greco-Roman featherweight event at the 1924 Summer Olympics.
