= Martin Egeberg =

Norwegian sport wrestler

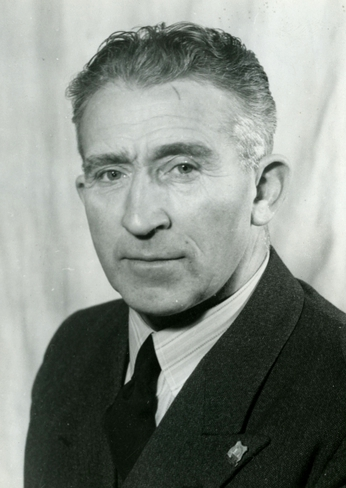
- Born: 7 December 1896; Oslo, Norway
- Died: 8 February 1977 (aged 80); Oslo, Norway

Martin Johan Egeberg (7 December 1896 – 8 February 1977) was a Norwegian sport wrestler who competed in two Summer Olympics.

He was born and died in Oslo, and represented the sports club SK av 1909. Competing in the featherweight division, he had success at the 1922 World Wrestling Championships where he won a silver medal, and the 1927 European Wrestling Championships where he won a bronze. He also finished eighth at the 1924 Summer Olympics and fourteenth at the 1928 Summer Olympics. He took three Norwegian national titles between 1926 and 1928.
