= René Rottenfluc =

French wrestler

- Born: 19 December 1900; Beaumesnil, Calvados, France
- Died: 8 April 1962 (aged 61); Paris, France

René Rottenfluc (19 December 1900 – 8 April 1962) was a French wrestler. He competed at the 1924 and 1928 Summer Olympics.
