= Karl Mezulian =

Austrian wrestler

- Born: 12 January 1899
- Died: 11 February 1967 (aged 68)

Karl Mezulian (12 January 1899 – 11 February 1967) was an Austrian wrestler. He competed in the Greco-Roman featherweight event at the 1924 Summer Olympics.
