= Volmar Wikström =

Finnish wrestler (1889–1957)

- Born: 27 December 1889; Pargas, Finland
- Died: 10 June 1957 (aged 67); Helsinki, Finland

Volmar Wikström
Medal record

Men's freestyle wrestling

Representing Finland

Olympic Games
Silver medal – second place	1924 Paris	Lightweight

Volmar Wikström (27 December 1889 – 10 June 1957) was a Finnish wrestler from Pargas, Olympic medalist in freestyle wrestling.

Wikström competed in Greco-Roman wrestling at the 1912 Summer Olympics in Stockholm, where he won the first four matches but was eliminated in the sixth round.

At the 1924 Summer Olympics in Paris he competed in freestyle wrestling, and received a silver medal in lightweight.
