= Aage Torgensen =

Danish wrestler (1900–1932)

- Born: 17 April 1900; Aarhus, Denmark
- Died: 28 May 1932 (aged 32); Aarhus, Denmark

Rasmus Aage Ejnar Torgensen (17 April 1900 – 28 May 1932) was a Danish wrestler. He competed at the 1920 and 1924 Summer Olympics.
