= Sigfrid Hansson =

Swedish wrestler (1901–1971)

Hans Sigfrid Hansson
- Born: 18 January 1901; Gårdstånga, Sweden
- Died: 13 November 1971 (aged 70); Limhamn, Sweden

Hans Sigfrid Hansson (18 January 1901 – 13 November 1971) was a Swedish wrestler. He competed in the freestyle featherweight and the Greco-Roman bantamweight events at the 1924 Summer Olympics.
