= Anselm Ahlfors =

Finnish wrestler (1897–1974)

- Born: 29 December 1897; Kotka, Finland
- Died: 13 August 1974 (aged 76); Jyväskylä, Finland

Anselm Ahlfors
Medal record

Men's Greco-Roman wrestling

Representing Finland

Olympic Games
| Silver medal – second place | 1924 Paris | Bantamweight |

Anselm Ahlfors (29 December 1897 – 13 August 1974) was a Finnish wrestler and Olympic medalist in Greco-Roman wrestling.

== Olympics ==
Ahlfors competed at the 1924 Summer Olympics in Paris where he won a silver medal in Greco-Roman wrestling, the bantamweight class.
