= Rudolf Svensson =

Swedish wrestler (1899–1978)

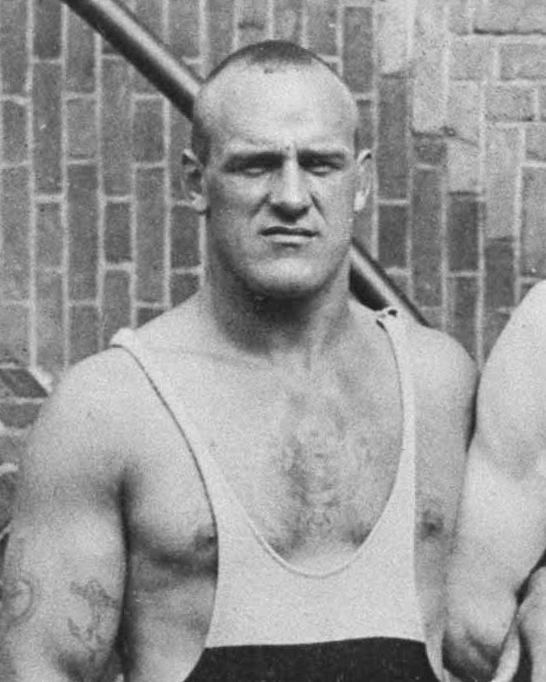
- Rudolf Svensson in 1928

Personal information
- Born: 27 March 1899 Gudhem, Sweden
- Died: 4 December 1978 (aged 79) Stockholm, Sweden
- Height: 191 cm (6 ft 3 in)

Sport
- Sport: Wrestling
- Club: Brandkårens IK
Medal record

Men's Greco-Roman wrestling
Representing Sweden
Olympic Games
Gold medal – first place	1928 Amsterdam	Heavyweight
Gold medal – first place	1932 Los Angeles	Light heavyweight
Silver medal – second place	1924 Paris	Light heavyweight
World Championships
Silver medal – second place	1921 Helsinki	Light heavyweight
Silver medal – second place	1922 Stockholm	Light heavyweight
Men's freestyle wrestling
Representing Sweden
Olympic Games
Silver medal – second place	1924 Paris	Light heavyweight

Johan Rudolf "Starke Rudolf" Svensson (27 March 1899 – 4 December 1978) was a Swedish wrestler and actor. He competed at the 1924, 1928 and 1932 Summer Olympics in four freestyle and Greco-Roman events in total, and won a gold or silver medal in each of them.

Svensson was most successful in the Greco-Roman light-heavyweight category, in which he won two European titles in 1925 and 1933, seven national titles in 1926–36, two silver medals at the world championships, and three at the European Championships. A firefighter by profession, Svensson also played minor roles in several Swedish movies between 1934 and 1952. In 2005 he was inducted into the International Wrestling Hall of Fame.

Svensson was born in Gudhem (present Falköping Municipality), represented Brandkårens IK, and died in Bromma, Stockholm.
