= Arthur Nord =

Norwegian wrestler

- Born: 25 January 1898; Kristiania, Norway
- Died: 4 November 1991 (aged 93); Oslo, Norway
- High school: Oslo, Norway

Arthur Paul Nord (25 January 1898 – 4 November 1991) was a Norwegian sport wrestler.

He was born in Kristiania and represented the club Oslo AK. He competed at the 1924 Summer Olympics, when he placed fourth in Greco-Roman wrestling, the featherweight class. He competed at the 1928 Olympics, tying 7th in Freestyle wrestling.
