= Carl Westergren =

Swedish wrestler (1895–1958)

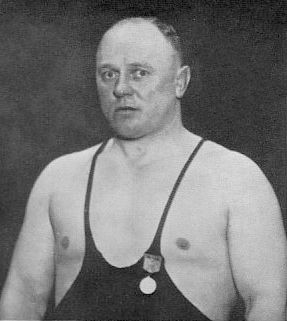

Personal information
- Born: 13 October 1895 Malmö, Sweden
- Died: 5 August 1958 (aged 62) Malmö, Sweden
- Weight: + 87 kg (192 lb)

Sport
- Sport: Wrestling
- Event: Greco-Roman
- Club: IK Sparta
Medal record
Men's Greco-Roman wrestling
Representing Sweden
Olympic Games
Gold medal – first place	1920 Antwerp	Middleweight
Gold medal – first place	1924 Paris	Light heavyweight
Gold medal – first place	1932 Los Angeles	Heavyweight
World Championships
Gold medal – first place	1922 Stockholm	Middleweight
European Championships
Gold medal – first place	1925 Milan	Light heavyweight
Gold medal – first place	1930 Stockholm	Heavyweight
Gold medal – first place	1931 Prague	Heavyweight
Bronze medal – third place	1933 Helsinki	Heavyweight

Carl "Calle" Oscar Westergren (13 October 1895 – 5 August 1958) was a Swedish wrestler who competed in the 1920, 1924, 1928, and 1932 Summer Olympics. He won gold medals in Greco-Roman wrestling in 1920, 1924 and 1932; in 1924 he also finished sixth in freestyle wrestling.

In Greco-Roman wrestling, Westergren also won the world middleweight title in 1922, as well as three European titles in different weight classes: middleweight in 1925, light-heavyweight in 1930, and unlimited in 1931. He worked as a bus driver and had two elder brothers who also trained in wrestling. He later became a keen pigeon breeder.
