= Erik Malmberg =

Swedish wrestler (1897–1964)

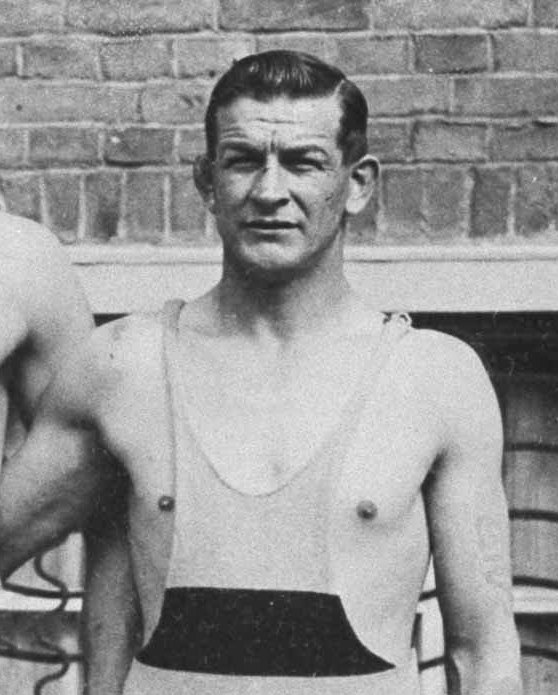
- Erik Malmberg at the 1928 Olympics

Personal information
- Born: 15 March 1897 Gothenburg, Sweden
- Died: 9 May 1964 (aged 67) Gothenburg, Sweden

Sport
- Sport: Greco-Roman wrestling
- Club: Göteborgs AK; Örgryte IS
Medal record
Men's Greco-Roman wrestling
Representing Sweden
Olympic Games
Gold medal – first place	1932 Los Angeles	Lightweight
Silver medal – second place	1928 Amsterdam	Featherweight
Bronze medal – third place	1924 Paris	Featherweight
World Championships
Bronze medal – third place	1921 Helsinki	Featherweight
European Championships
Gold medal – first place	1930 Stockholm	Lightweight
Silver medal – second place	1926 Riga	Featherweight
Bronze medal – third place	1925 Milan	Featherweight
Men's freestyle wrestling
European Championships
Gold medal – first place	1929 Paris	Lightweight
Silver medal – second place	1930 Brussels	Lightweight

Erik Malmberg (15 March 1897 – 9 May 1964) was a Swedish wrestler. He competed at the 1924, 1928 and 1932 Summer Olympics in Greco-Roman events and won a bronze, a silver, and a gold medal, respectively. His younger brother Algost also took part in the 1928 Games, but as a freestyle wrestler. Malmberg was a businessman by trade.

Malmberg was born in Gothenburg, represented Göteborgs AK and Örgryte IS, and died in Gothenburg.
