= Aleksanteri Toivola =

Finnish wrestler (1893–1987)

- Born: 4 March 1893; Leningrad, Russia
- Died: 27 August 1987 (aged 94); Uusimaa, Finland
Medal record
Men's Greco-Roman wrestling
Representing Finland
Olympic Games
Silver medal – second place	1924 Paris	Featherweight

Aleksanteri Toivola (4 March 1893 – 27 August 1987) was a Finnish wrestler and Olympic medalist in Greco-Roman wrestling. Born in Leningrad, Russia, he was also known as Aleksander Toivola.

== Olympics ==
Toivola he competed at the 1924 Summer Olympics in Paris where he won a silver medal in Greco-Roman wrestling, the featherweight class.
