= Fritiof Svensson =

Swedish wrestler (1896–1961)

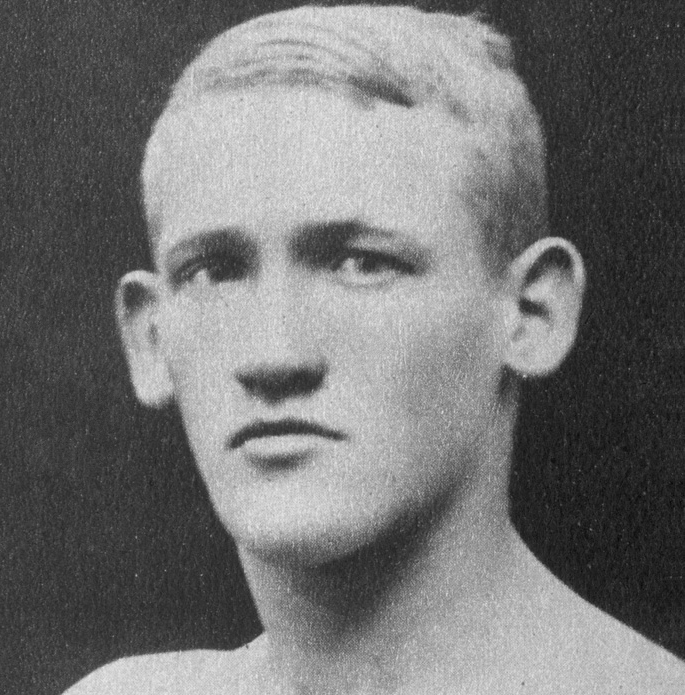

Personal information
- Born: 2 June 1896 Bälinge, Sweden
- Died: 5 March 1961 (aged 64) Stockholm, Sweden
- Relative: Jesper Turkulainen (great grandnephew)

Sport
- Sport: Greco-Roman wrestling
- Club: Djurgårdens IF, Stockholm
Medal record
Men's Greco-Roman wrestling
Representing Sweden
Olympic Games
| Bronze medal – third place | 1920 Antwerp | Featherweight |
World Championships
| Gold medal – first place | 1922 Stockholm | 58 kg |

Konrad Martin Fritiof Svensson (2 June 1896 – 5 March 1961) was a featherweight Greco-Roman wrestler from Sweden who competed at the 1920 and 1924 Summer Olympics. He won a bronze medal in 1920 and finished fifth in 1924. Svensson won a world title in Stockholm in 1922.

Svensson represented Djurgårdens IF.
