= Katsutoshi Naito =

Japanese wrestler (1895–1969)

- Born: 25 February 1895; Hongawa, Hiroshima, Japan
- Died: 27 September 1969 (aged 74); São Paulo, Brazil
Medal record
Men's freestyle wrestling
Representing Japan
Olympic Games
| Bronze medal – third place | 1924 Paris | Featherweight |

Katsutoshi Naito (内藤克俊, Naito Katsutoshi; 25 February 1895 – 27 September 1969) was a Japanese wrestler who competed in the 1924 Summer Olympics.

== Biography ==
A native of the city of Hiroshima, Naito lost both of his parents at a young age, and was sent to be raised by his married elder sister living in Taiwan. He attended what later became the Taipei Municipal Jianguo High School, followed by Kagoshima University. He then travelled to the United States, where he attended Pennsylvania State University, majoring in horticulture. Proficient in Kodokan judo, Naito joined the university's wrestling team, and soon became its captain, with the nickname of "Tiger Naito". However, this was a time of growing anti-Japanese sentiment in the United States, and for his own protection, Naito was asked to board with the rector of the university. With the passage of the Immigration Act of 1924, also known as the Asian Exclusion Act, it became impossible for Naito to represent the team in international competitions. The provost of Pennsylvania State University contacted the Japanese ambassador in Washington DC, and recommended Naito for inclusion into the Japanese team for the 1924 Summer Olympics in Paris, France.

At the time, wrestling was largely neglected as a sport in Japan due to the popularity of Judo, and the inclusion of Naito into the Japanese team was made mostly for political reasons. Despite injuring his fingers in practice aboard the ship from the United States to France, Naito placed third in the freestyle wrestling competition, securing the bronze medal. It was also the only medal that the Japanese team won during the Olympics.

Following this success, Naito decided to return to Japan, where he was invited to hold seminars on western-style wrestling at Waseda University. The sport also drew the attention of the Imperial Japanese Army, who asked Naito to teach instructors at the Toyama Military Academy, the training grounds for Japanese military intelligence and special forces. Naito's alma mater, Kagoshima University, also established a wrestling club. However, the seeds planted by Naito did not bear immediate results, and after Japan's lackluster performance at the 1928 Summer Olympics, the sport was again eclipsed in popularity by judo.

Naito, after living for a period in Taiwan, immigrated with his family to Brazil in 1928, where he became a successful businessman and chairman of Brazil's Horticulture Associate. He is also credited with introducing the sports of judo and kendo to Brazil.

President of Japan Chapter of the Penn State Alumni Association from Tokyo[3] donated Katsutoshi Naito Plaque to President of the university[4] at a ceremony held in his honor in 1995 at Old Main.

== See also ==
- List of Pennsylvania State University Olympians
