= Edil Rosenqvist =

Finnish wrestler (1892–1973)

Personal information
- Born: 11 December 1892 Degerby, Finland
- Died: 14 September 1973 (aged 80) Helsinki, Finland
Medal record
Men's Greco-Roman wrestling
Representing Finland
Olympic Games
Silver medal – second place	1920 Antwerp	Light heavyweight
Silver medal – second place	1924 Paris	Heavyweight

Edil Albert Rosenqvist (11 December 1892 – 14 September 1973) was a Finnish wrestler and Olympic medalist in Greco-Roman wrestling.

== Olympics ==
Rosenqvist competed at the 1920 Summer Olympics in Antwerp where he received a silver medal in Greco-Roman wrestling, the light heavyweight class.

At the 1924 Summer Olympics in Paris he received a silver medal in the heavyweight class.
