= Gymnastics at the 1924 Summer Olympics – Men's vault =

Gymnastics at the Olympics

Men's vault at the Games of the VIII Olympiad
- Venue: Stade Olympique Yves-du-Manoir
- Date: July 21, 1924
- Competitors: 70 from 9 nations
- Winning score: 9.98

Medalists
1st place, gold medalist(s)		Frank Kriz; United States
2nd place, silver medalist(s)		Jan Koutný; Czechoslovakia
3rd place, bronze medalist(s)		Bohumil Mořkovský; Czechoslovakia

The men's vault event was part of the gymnastics programme at the 1924 Summer Olympics. It was one of nine gymnastics events and it was contested for the third time after 1896 and 1904. The competition was held on Monday, July 21, 1924. Seventy gymnasts from nine nations competed. The eight members of each nation's gymnastics team all competed; Czechoslovakia only had six competitors start the vault. The event was won by Frank Kriz of the United States, the nation's second consecutive victory in the event. Jan Koutný and Bohumil Mořkovský of Czechoslovakia took silver and bronze, respectively, the nation's first medals in the event.

== Background ==
This was the third appearance of the event, which is one of the five apparatus events held every time there were apparatus events at the Summer Olympics (no apparatus events were held in 1900, 1908, 1912, or 1920). After three Games without apparatus events, the vault was one of seven apparatus events in 1924 (five, including the vault, have been held at every Games since, joined by the floor exercise in 1932). A similar event, the sidehorse vault, was held for the only time in Olympic history.

Two nations were competing in the event for the second time: Switzerland had previously competed in 1896 and the United States had competed in 1904. The other seven nations (Czechoslovakia, Finland, France, Great Britain, Italy, Luxembourg, and Yugoslavia) were competing for the first time.

== Competition format ==
The 1924 vault competition was very different from a modern vault competition, or even from other vault competitions at the time. Competitors had to jump from a springboard over a bar to reach the vaulting horse, landing with the hands on the horse and swinging their feet to the ground. Scores were based on the height of the bar (with the maximum score of 10 with the bar set at 1.70 metres above the ground) and the performance of the jump. Each gymnast was allowed three jumps. Scores were reported as 0 to 10; it is unclear whether the three jump scores were averaged or if the highest score was used.

The vault was one of 11 components of the individual all-around score, and thus was also included in the team all-around score.

== Schedule ==
Date	Time	Round
Monday, 21 July 1924		Final

== Results ==
Four gymnasts received a score of 0 when they were unable to clear the bar on any of their three jumps.

Rank	Gymnast	Nation	Height Jump 1	Height Jump 2	Height Jump 3	Score
1st place, gold medalist(s)	Frank Kriz	United States	1.70	1.70	1.70	9.98
2nd place, silver medalist(s)	Jan Koutný	Czechoslovakia	1.70	1.70	1.70	9.97
3rd place, bronze medalist(s)	Bohumil Mořkovský	Czechoslovakia	1.70	1.70	1.70	9.93
4	Leon Štukelj	Yugoslavia	1.60	1.70	1.70	9.91
5	Max Wandrer	United States	1.70	1.70	1.70	9.85
6	Janez Porenta	Yugoslavia	1.50	1.70	1.70	9.76
7	Ferdinando Mandrini	Italy	1.60	1.70	1.70	9.75
7	Miroslav Klinger	Czechoslovakia	1.70	1.70	1.70	9.75
9	Robert Pražák	Czechoslovakia	1.70	1.70	1.70	9.74
10	Ladislav Vácha	Czechoslovakia	1.70	1.70	1.70	9.70
11	Al Jochim	United States	1.70	1.70	1.70	9.58
11	Curtis Rottman	United States	1.70	1.70	1.70	9.58
13	Albert Séguin	France	1.60	1.70	1.70	9.45
14	Luigi Cambiaso	Italy	1.60	1.70	1.70	9.37
15	Bedřich Šupčík	Czechoslovakia	1.60	1.60	1.70	9.33
16	Thomas Hopkins	Great Britain	1.60	1.70	1.70	9.22
17	August Güttinger	Switzerland	1.60	1.65	1.70	9.08
18	Jean Gounot	France	1.60	1.60	1.65	9.00
19	Harold Brown	Great Britain	1.60	1.70	1.70	8.92
20	Léon Delsarte	France	1.60	1.65	1.65	8.77
21	Luigi Maiocco	Italy	1.60	1.70	1.70	8.75
22	Henry Finchett	Great Britain	1.60	1.70	1.70	8.45
23	Jean Gutweninger	Switzerland	1.60	1.65	1.65	8.37
24	Otto Pfister	Switzerland	1.60	1.65	1.70	8.33
25	Georges Miez	Switzerland	1.60	1.60	1.70	8.17
26	Stane Derganc	Yugoslavia	1.50	1.60	1.60	8.00
27	Émile Munhofen	Luxembourg	1.50	1.60	1.60	7.78
28	Mihael Oswald	Yugoslavia	1.50	1.60	1.70	7.716
29	Jacques Palzer	Luxembourg	1.50	1.60	1.60	7.66
29	Frank Safandra	United States	1.60	1.60	1.60	7.66
31	John Mais	United States	1.60	1.60	1.60	7.58
32	John Pearson	United States	1.70	1.70	1.70	7.50
33	François Gangloff	France	1.60	1.60	1.70	7.43
34	Mario Lertora	Italy	1.60	1.70	1.70	7.32
35	Mikko Hämäläinen	Finland	1.50	1.60	1.70	7.23
35	Jaakko Kunnas	Finland	1.50	1.60	1.70	7.23
37	Akseli Roine	Finland	1.50	1.60	1.70	7.22
38	Aarne Roine	Finland	1.50	1.60	1.70	7.17
39	Stane Žilič	Yugoslavia	1.50	1.60	1.70	7.16
40	André Higelin	France	1.50	1.60	1.70	7.13
41	Giuseppe Paris	Italy	1.60	1.60	1.70	7.08
41	Hans Grieder	Switzerland	1.60	1.60	1.70	7.08
43	Rudolph Novak	United States	1.60	1.60	1.60	7.00
43	Otto Suhonen	Finland	1.50	1.60	1.60	7.00
45	Vittorio Lucchetti	Italy	1.50	1.60	1.60	6.90
46	Josef Wilhelm	Switzerland	1.60	1.65	1.70	6.87
47	Väinö Karonen	Finland	1.60	1.70	1.70	6.50
48	Théo Jeitz	Luxembourg	1.50	1.50	1.60	5.85
49	Josip Primožič	Yugoslavia	1.50	1.60	1.60	5.75
50	Albert Neumann	Luxembourg	1.50	1.60	1.60	5.68
51	Eugène Cordonnier	France	1.50	1.50	1.55	5.63
52	Charles Quaino	Luxembourg	1.50	1.60	1.60	5.58
53	Giorgio Zampori	Italy	1.50	1.60	1.60	5.50
54	Joseph Huber	France	1.50	1.60	1.60	5.42
55	Albert Spencer	Great Britain	1.40	1.40	1.50	5.15
56	Stanley Leigh	Great Britain	1.40	1.45	1.50	5.07
57	Francesco Martino	Italy	1.50	1.50	1.50	4.83
57	Carl Widmer	Switzerland	1.50	1.60	1.60	4.83
59	Samuel Humphreys	Great Britain	1.40	1.50	1.55	4.60
60	Mathias Erang	Luxembourg	1.30	1.40	1.50	3.85
61	Rastko Poljšak	Yugoslavia	1.30	1.30	1.40	3.616
62	Stane Hlastan	Yugoslavia	1.40	1.40	1.50	3.40
63	Frank Hawkins	Great Britain	1.40	1.40	1.50	3.27
64	Eetu Kostamo	Finland	1.40	1.50	1.50	3.17
65	Pierre Tolar	Luxembourg	1.30	1.40	1.40	2.00
66	Eevert Kerttula	Finland	1.50	1.40	1.40	1.17
67	Arthur Hermann	France	1.50	1.50	1.50	0.00
67	Antoine Rebetez	Switzerland	1.50	1.50	1.50	0.00
67	Mathias Weishaupt	Luxembourg	1.30	1.30	1.30	0.00
67	Edward Leigh	Great Britain	1.30	1.30	1.30	0.00
—	Stanislav Indruch	Czechoslovakia	DNS			
—	Josef Kos	Czechoslovakia	DNS			
