= Gymnastics at the 1924 Summer Olympics – Men's artistic individual all-around =

Olympic gymnastics event

Men's artistic individual all-around at the Games of the VIII Olympiad
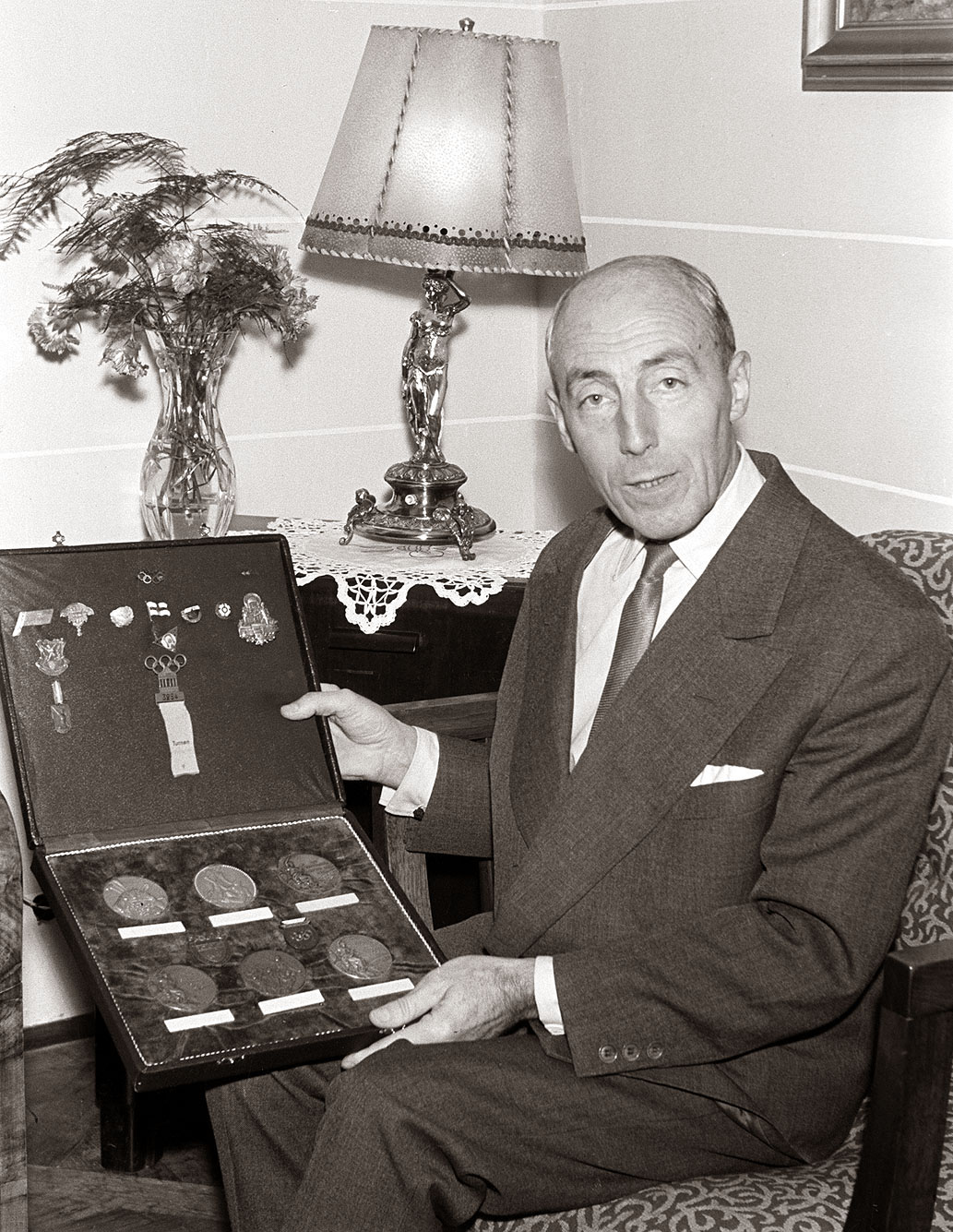
- Gold medalist Leon Štukelj displaying his Olympic medals in 1958
- Venue: Stade Olympique
- Dates: 17–23 July 1924
- Competitors: 72 from 9 nations
- Winning score: 110.340

Medalists
1st place, gold medalist(s)		Leon Štukelj; Yugoslavia
2nd place, silver medalist(s)		Robert Pražák; Czechoslovakia
3rd place, bronze medalist(s)		Bedřich Šupčík; Czechoslovakia

The men's artistic individual all-around event was part of the gymnastics programme at the 1924 Summer Olympics. It was one of nine gymnastics events and it was contested for the sixth time. The competition was held from Thursday, 17 July 1924, to Wednesday, 23 July 1924. Seventy-two gymnasts from nine nations competed. Each nation could send up to 8 gymnasts, up from 6 in previous Games. For the first time since 1904, the scores for individual competitors were used to calculate a team score (the team events were completely separate from 1908 to 1920). The men's artistic individual all-around was won by Leon Štukelj of Yugoslavia. Czechoslovakia's Robert Pražák took silver, while Bedřich Šupčík earned bronze. Both nations were making their debut in the event.

== Background ==
This was the sixth appearance of the men's individual all-around. The first individual all-around competition had been held in 1900, after the 1896 competitions featured only individual apparatus events. A men's individual all-around has been held every Games since 1900.

Four of the top 10 gymnasts from the 1920 Games returned: gold medalist Giorgio Zampori of Italy, bronze medalist Jean Gounot of France, seventh-place finisher Luigi Maiocco of Italy, and tenth-place finisher Frank Kriz of the United States. Neither of the 1922 World co-champions competed in Paris, but third-place finisher Stane Derganc of Yugoslavia did.

Czechoslovakia and Yugoslavia each made their debut in the event. France and Italy each made their fifth appearance, tied for most among nations, both having missed only the 1904 Games in St. Louis.

== Competition format ==
The format for the all-around competition in the early Olympic Games varied significantly. In the 1924 Olympics, the all-around competition returned with individual apparatus events for the first time since 1904. The scoring method for the all-around competition involved aggregating scores from 7 apparatus events. These included compulsory and optional exercises in the parallel bars, horizontal bar, rings, and pommel horse, as well as optional exercises on the "regular" and "sidehorse" vaults, and a rope climb. Scores for the four two-exercise apparatus events ranged from 0 to 11 (including half-points for approach and dismount, in addition to the 0-10 score for the exercise itself). Scores for the two types of vault and the rope climb ranged from 0 to 10. This scoring system allowed for a maximum total score of 118 points.

== Schedule ==
Date	Time	Round
Thursday, 17 July 1924		Final
Friday, 18 July 1924		Final, continued
Saturday, 19 July 1924		Final, continued
Sunday, 20 July 1924		Final, continued

== Results ==
Results are listed in what appears to have been the Olympic Order of the time. Current Olympic Order (as of 2019, and as of the last few decades) is very different from what occurred in this and previous competitions. Contextual details strongly suggest that this is the order in which the gymnasts competed - High bar, Parallel bars, Rings, Rope Climb, Vault (two separate apparatus set-ups on this occasion - "Over bar" and "regular"; the "regular" was actually the sidehorse vault), and, lastly, Pommel horse.

Rank	Gymnast	Nation	Horizontal bar			Parallel bars			Rings (gymnastics)			Rope Climb		Vault (gymnastics)		Pommel horse			Total
Rank	Gymnast	Nation	C	V	Total	C	V	Total	C	V	Total	Time	Points	Over bar	Regular	C	V	Total	Total
1st place, gold medalist(s)	Leon Štukelj	Yugoslavia	10.23	9.50	19.73	10.27	10.13	20.40	10.33	11.00	21.33	8.60	10.00	9.91	9.60	10.17	9.20	19.37	110.340
2nd place, silver medalist(s)	Robert Pražák	Czechoslovakia	9.23	9.50	18.73	10.88	10.73	21.61	10.60	10.883	21.483	8.80	10.00	9.73	9.80	10.47	8.50	18.97	110.323
3rd place, bronze medalist(s)	Bedřich Šupčík	Czechoslovakia	9.86	8.00	17.86	10.83	10.43	21.26	10.27	10.85	21.12	7.20	10.00	9.33	9.83	10.63	6.90	17.53	106.930
4	Ferdinando Mandrini	Italy	8.37	9.75	18.12	9.78	10.43	20.21	10.36	10.583	20.943	9.00	10.00	9.75	9.50	8.33	8.73	17.06	105.583
5	Miroslav Klinger	Czechoslovakia	7.97	8.50	16.47	10.73	10.40	21.13	10.233	10.50	20.73	9.40	8.00	9.75	9.75	10.67	9.00	19.67	105.500
6	Ladislav Vácha	Czechoslovakia	6.90	7.80	14.70	10.81	10.50	21.31	10.43	11.00	21.43	7.80	10.00	9.70	9.83	9.80	8.53	18.33	105.300
7	August Güttinger	Switzerland	9.47	9.416	18.886	10.70	10.93	21.63	9.32	8.25	17.57	7.80	10.00	9.08	8.41	9.53	10.07	19.60	105.176
8	Jean Gounot	France	9.96	9.083	19.043	9.98	10.17	20.15	9.00	10.73	19.73	8.40	10.00	9.00	9.93	9.03	8.27	17.30	105.153
9	Léon Delsarte	France	9.80	9.00	18.633	10.70	10.00	20.70	10.00	10.566	20.566	8.80	10.00	8.77	9.50	8.30	8.27	16.57	104.739
10	Mario Lertora	Italy	9.60	8.766	18.366	10.46	10.87	21.33	10.25	10.083	20.333	8.60	10.00	7.32	9.11	7.66	9.50	17.16	103.619
11	Jan Koutný	Czechoslovakia	7.80	7.916	15.716	10.73	10.27	21.00	10.47	10.583	21.053	9.40	8.00	9.97	9.75	9.77	8.10	17.87	103.359
12	Vittorio Lucchetti	Italy	8.67	8.60	17.27	9.80	10.53	20.33	10.83	10.083	20.913	9.00	10.00	6.90	9.20	8.06	10.13	18.19	102.803
13	Bohumil Mořkovský	Czechoslovakia	6.73	7.833	14.563	10.80	10.13	20.93	10.33	10.75	21.08	9.00	10.00	9.93	9.45	9.46	7.33	16.79	102.743
14	Jean Gutweninger	Switzerland	9.57	9.666	19.236	10.56	10.70	21.26	9.68	8.166	17.846	9.80	6.00	8.37	8.50	10.40	10.73	21.13	102.342
15	Albert Séguin	France	7.10	8.583	15.683	10.63	9.50	20.13	10.00	10.633	20.633	7.40	10.00	9.45	10.00	10.53	5.90	16.43	102.326
16	Francesco Martino	Italy	9.47	8.916	18.386	10.46	10.43	20.89	10.72	10.833	21.553	8.80	10.00	4.83	8.58	7.82	9.47	17.29	101.529
17	Luigi Cambiaso	Italy	8.83	8.35	17.18	10.73	10.17	20.90	9.98	10.00	19.98	9.00	10.00	9.37	9.15	5.37	9.37	14.74	101.320
18	Giuseppe Paris	Italy	6.87	9.486	16.356	10.26	10.60	20.86	10.16	9.583	19.743	9.40	8.00	7.08	9.03	10.00	10.10	20.10	101.169
19	Frank Kriz	United States	9.50	8.00	17.50	10.67	9.00	19.67	7.83	7.583	15.413	8.40	10.00	9.98	9.8	9.40	8.53	17.93	100.293
20	Janez Porenta	Yugoslavia	7.10	7.066	14.166	9.20	9.70	18.90	9.41	10.15	19.56	8.40	10.00	9.76	9.516	10.00	8.27	18.27	100.172
21	Eugène Cordonnier	France	7.97	7.916	15.886	10.23	10.27	20.50	10.40	10.50	20.90	9.40	8.00	5.63	9.80	10.36	8.83	19.19	99.906
22	Hans Grieder	Switzerland	6.93	10.016	16.946	10.11	10.83	20.94	9.82	7.25	17.07	9.00	10.00	7.08	9.17	9.07	9.37	18.44	99.646
23	François Gangloff	France	9.60	9.333	18.933	10.53	9.60	20.13	10.22	10.383	20.603	10.00	5.00	7.43	9.93	7.64	9.13	16.77	98.796
23	Georges Miez	Switzerland	9.20	9.85	19.05	10.06	10.30	20.36	8.77	7.916	16.686	9.60	7.00	8.17	8.70	8.46	10.37	18.83	98.796
25	Josef Wilhelm	Switzerland	8.20	8.95	17.15	10.53	10.87	21.40	9.72	7.916	17.636	10.40	4.00	6.87	9.06	10.53	10.70	21.23	97.346
26	Giorgio Zampori	Italy	6.87	9.333	16.203	10.45	11.00	21.45	10.33	9.916	20.246	9.80	6.00	5.50	9.42	7.73	10.00	17.73	96.549
27	Arthur Hermann	France	8.57	8.933	17.503	10.46	9.67	20.13	9.32	10.383	19.703	8.40	10.00	0.00	9.00	10.33	9.13	19.46	95.796
28	Otto Pfister	Switzerland	8.27	8.65	16.92	8.96	10.00	18.96	9.08	8.166	17.246	9.60	7.00	8.33	8.86	8.26	10.17	18.43	95.746
29	Stane Žilič	Yugoslavia	8.50	7.83	16.33	10.00	9.00	19.00	8.50	9.733	18.233	8.00	10.00	7.16	9.06	8.51	7.23	15.74	95.523
30	Stane Derganc	Yugoslavia	9.26	7.80	17.06	10.36	9.50	19.86	10.08	8.00	18.08	11.60	2.00	9.58	9.51	9.90	9.10	19.00	95.293
31	Al Jochim	United States	9.26	7.80	17.06	10.36	9.50	19.86	10.08	8.00	18.08	11.60	2.00	9.58	9.51	9.90	9.10	19.00	95.090
32	Carl Widmer	Switzerland	6.94	9.25	16.19	9.13	10.63	19.76	9.08	7.916	16.996	9.20	9.00	4.83	7.66	10.40	10.10	20.50	94.936
33	Luigi Maiocco	Italy	6.33	8.333	14.663	8.11	10.17	18.28	10.25	9.083	19.333	10.00	5.00	8.75	8.33	8.13	10.00	18.13	92.486
34	André Higelin	France	9.93	9.233	19.163	9.78	9.70	19.48	8.42	9.45	17.87	9.80	6.00	7.13	9.70	6.96	5.83	12.79	92.133
35	Stanley Leigh	Great Britain	9.10	9.25	18.35	10.11	10.17	20.28	10.00	8.666	18.666	11.60	2.00	5.07	9.41	8.49	9.00	17.49	91.266
36	Mihael Oswald	Yugoslavia	6.73	7.55	14.28	7.75	9.10	16.85	9.16	10.00	19.16	9.40	8.00	7.716	8.93	8.80	7.33	16.13	91.066
37	John Pearson	United States	8.74	7.25	15.99	8.71	10.10	18.81	6.33	7.416	13.746	8.60	10.00	7.50	8.71	6.766	8.33	15.096	89.852
38	Antoine Rebetez	Switzerland	9.47	9.583	19.053	8.55	10.53	19.08	9.42	8.50	17.92	10.20	5.00	0.00	7.80	10.00	10.73	20.73	89.583
39	Joseph Huber	France	4.77	7.916	12.686	10.21	9.77	19.98	9.00	10.033	19.033	10.20	5.00	5.42	9.57	8.93	7.50	16.43	88.119
40	Harold Brown	Great Britain	7.74	6.466	14.206	9.60	8.60	18.20	9.70	5.833	15.533	9.40	8.00	8.92	7.83	6.54	7.83	14.37	87.059
41	Frank Safandra	United States	6.40	6.50	12.90	9.45	8.90	18.35	9.00	8.583	17.583	8.80	10.00	7.66	3.00	10.00	7.46	17.46	86.953
42	Curtis Rottman	United States	6.64	5.65	12.29	8.83	8.00	16.83	9.76	8.00	17.76	11.40	2.00	8.45	9.08	7.87	7.43	15.3	82.946
43	Henry Finchett	Great Britain	6.64	5.65	12.29	8.83	8.00	16.83	9.76	8.00	17.76	11.40	2.00	8.45	9.08	7.87	7.43	15.30	81.710
44	Stane Hlastan	Yugoslavia	7.10	7.966	15.066	9.25	9.80	19.05	8.91	8.633	17.543	13.40	0.00	3.40	9.86	8.86	7.47	16.33	81.249
45	Rastko Poljšak	Yugoslavia	6.27	7.266	13.536	9.00	9.00	18.00	7.66	8.333	15.993	10.40	4.00	3.616	7.96	8.66	6.56	15.22	78.325
46	Rudolph Novak	United States	3.37	6.333	9.703	6.73	8.17	14.90	7.60	7.50	15.10	9.60	7.00	7.00	8.40	7.73	7.70	15.43	77.533
47	Josip Primožič	Yugoslavia	6.80	6.66	13.46	10.15	9.27	19.42	6.00	8.583	14.583	10.80	3.00	5.75	8.55	6.50	6.13	12.63	77.393
48	Max Wandrer	United States	3.94	6.30	10.24	6.46	8.43	14.89	3.50	6.50	10.00	8.80	10.00	9.85	9.65	4.70	6.99	1.69	76.320
49	Fred Hawkins	Great Britain	4.90	4.833	9.733	9.43	8.77	18.20	8.00	6.50	14.50	9.60	7.00	3.27	7.83	6.803	6.46	13.263	73.796
50	Charles Quaino	Luxembourg	4.73	6.916	11.646	9.8	8.7	18.5	8.33	9.333	17.663	12.00	0.00	5.58	9.62	5.56	5.00	10.56	73.569
51	Jaakko Kunnas	Finland	6.00	7.583	13.583	9.15	9.83	18.98	6.00	6.75	12.75	10.20	5.00	7.23	7.27	4.43	4.23	8.66	73.473
52	Otto Suhonen	Finland	8.47	7.383	15.853	7.53	9.10	16.63	3.66	5.50	9.16	9.80	6.00	7.00	8.33	3.97	5.90	9.87	72.843
53	John Mais	United States	6.70	7.23	13.93	6.80	8.27	15.07	5.66	6.50	12.16	11.60	2.00	7.58	9.26	5.57	7.20	12.77	72.770
54	Thomas Hopkins	Great Britain	5.24	5.60	10.84	8.70	7.50	16.20	8.00	5.75	13.75	11.40	2.00	9.22	9.13	4.55	6.66	11.21	72.350
55	Ernest Leigh	Great Britain	5.47	6.65	12.12	8.98	8.23	17.21	9.50	9.00	18.50	12.20	0.00	0.00	8.17	6.47	6.73	13.20	69.200
56	Akseli Roine	Finland	5.90	6.333	12.233	7.53	9.50	17.03	3.83	6.25	10.08	10.20	5.00	7.22	6.87	3.20	4.87	8.08	66.503
57	Théo Jeitz	Luxembourg	5.10	7.75	12.85	9.13	8.17	17.30	7.50	8.25	15.75	15.00	0.00	5.85	8.83	2.40	3.00	5.40	65.980
58	Émile Munhofen	Luxembourg	3.80	6.566	10.366	8.60	8.43	17.03	7.60	7.50	15.10	14.60	0.00	7.78	8.68	2.80	3.80	6.60	65.556
59	Aarne Roine	Finland	7.13	6.15	13.28	6.35	9.27	15.62	5.83	7.00	12.83	12.60	0.00	7.17	7.43	4.33	4.80	9.13	65.460
60	Mikko Hämäläinen	Finland	5.04	6.833	11.873	7.48	9.53	17.01	5.16	6.00	11.16	12.60	0.00	7.23	8.00	4.66	5.30	9.96	65.233
61	Albert Neumann	Luxembourg	4.16	7.083	11.243	9.61	8.67	18.28	6.83	7.833	14.663	12.80	0.00	5.68	8.33	3.00	4.00	7.00	65.196
62	Väinö Karonen	Finland	8.27	7.15	15.42	6.40	7.17	13.57	3.16	6.00	9.16	10.80	3.00	6.50	7.83	4.90	4.80	9.70	65.180
63	Stan Humphreys	Great Britain	5.10	5.833	10.933	4.43	7.93	12.36	8.66	6.833	15.493	11.20	2.00	4.60	8.17	6.07	5.03	11.10	64.656
64	Mathias Erang	Luxembourg	4.00	5.833	9.833	6.90	9.00	15.90	8.50	8.083	16.583	15.00	0.00	3.85	9.80	4.39	4.00	8.39	64.356
65	Alfred Spencer	Great Britain	6.41	6.483	12.893	4.40	7.50	11.90	6.50	5.25	11.75	11.80	1.00	5.15	7.50	7.23	6.83	14.06	64.253
66	Eevert Kerttula	Finland	5.64	6.633	12.273	8.40	10.23	18.63	5.00	7.50	12.50	11.80	1.00	1.17	8.50	4.33	4.46	8.79	62.863
67	Jacques Palzer	Luxembourg	4.13	5.333	9.463	5.40	8.40	13.80	6.66	8.25	14.91	14.20	0.00	7.66	8.33	2.40	5.00	7.40	61.563
68	Pierre Tolar	Luxembourg	3.30	4.50	7.80	6.65	8.10	14.75	8.60	8.583	17.183	10.80	3.00	2.00	8.08	2.40	3.50	5.90	58.713
69	Mathias Weishaupt	Luxembourg	3.30	5.25	8.55	8.20	8.50	16.70	8..43	9.066	17.496	11.40	2.00	0.00	7.33	2.52	4.00	6.52	58.596
70	Eetu Kostamo	Finland	5.37	5.883	11.253	6.80	3.33	10.13	4.16	5.50	9.66	12.00	0.00	3.17	7.60	3.83	4.80	8.63	50.443
—	Stanislav Indruch	Czechoslovakia	9.66	8.30	17.96	10.78	10.50	21.28	—	—	—	—	—	—	—	—	—	—	39.24
—	Josef Kos	Czechoslovakia	8.93	8.5	17.43	10.73	9.77	20.5	—	—	—	—	—	—	—	—	—	—	37.93
