= Gymnastics at the 1924 Summer Olympics – Men's parallel bars =

Olympic gymnastics event

Men's parallel bars at the Games of the VIII Olympiad
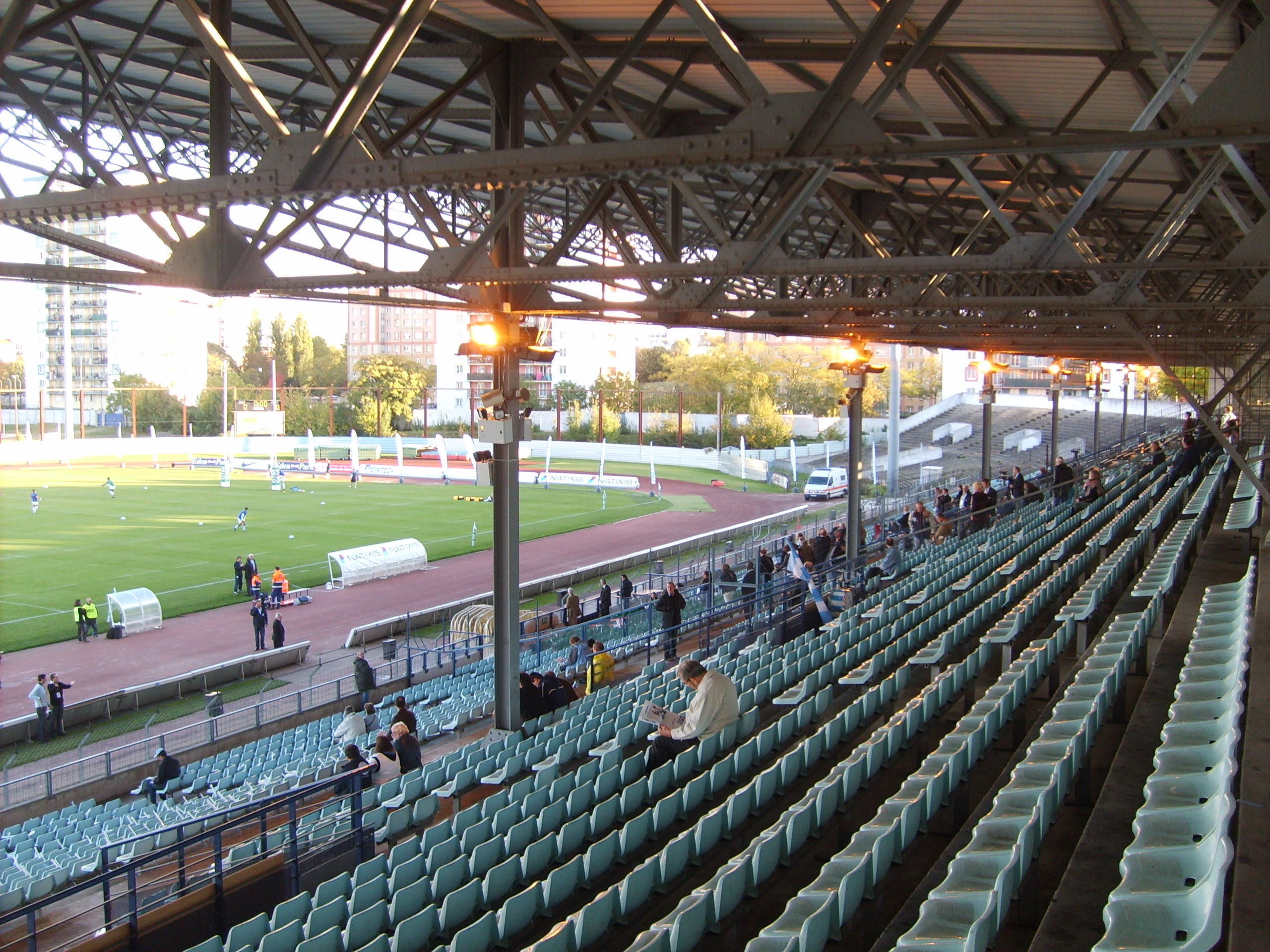
- Stade Olympique Yves-du-Manoir (2009)
- Venue: Stade Olympique Yves-du-Manoir
- Date: 20 July 1924
- Competitors: 72 from 9 nations
- Winning score: 21.63

Medalists
1st place, gold medalist(s)		August Güttinger; Switzerland
2nd place, silver medalist(s)		Robert Pražák; Czechoslovakia
3rd place, bronze medalist(s)		Giorgio Zampori; Italy

The men's parallel bars event was part of the gymnastics programme at the 1924 Summer Olympics. It was one of nine gymnastics events and it was contested for the third time after 1896 and 1904. The competition was held on Sunday, July 20, 1924. Seventy-two gymnasts from nine nations competed. The event was won by August Güttinger of Switzerland, the nation's first victory in the event. Robert Pražák of Czechoslovakia and Giorgio Zampori of Italy earned silver and bronze, respectively.

== Background ==
This was the third appearance of the event, which is one of the five apparatus events held every time there were apparatus events at the Summer Olympics (no apparatus events were held in 1900, 1908, 1912, or 1920). The 1922 world championship was won by Leon Štukelj of Yugoslavia, with a five-way tie for second between multiple gymnasts from each of Yugoslavia and Czechoslavkia (three of whom—Stane Derganc, Miroslav Klinger, and Stanislav Indruch—competed at the 1924 Games along with Štukelj.

Three nations had previously competed, France and Switzerland in 1896 and the United States in 1904. The other six nations (Czechoslovakia, Finland, Great Britain, Italy, Luxembourg, and Yugoslavia) were competing for the first time.

== Competition format ==
Each gymnast performed a compulsory exercise and a voluntary exercise. These two exercises were 2 of the 11 components of the individual all-around score, and thus were also included in the team all-around score. Each exercise had a maximum possible score of 11, with half a point each for the approach and dismount and up to 10 points for the routine.

== Schedule ==
The competition was held in a single day.

Date	Time	Round
Sunday, 20 July 1924		Final

== Results ==
Rank	Gymnast	Nation	Total
1st place, gold medalist(s)	August Güttinger	Switzerland	21.63
2nd place, silver medalist(s)	Robert Pražák	Czechoslovakia	21.61
3rd place, bronze medalist(s)	Giorgio Zampori	Italy	21.45
4	Josef Wilhelm	Switzerland	21.40
5	Mario Lertora	Italy	21.33
6	Ladislav Vácha	Czechoslovakia	21.31
7	Josef Kos	Czechoslovakia	21.28
8	Jean Gutweninger	Switzerland	21.26
8	Bedřich Šupčík	Czechoslovakia	21.26
10	Miroslav Klinger	Czechoslovakia	21.13
11	Jan Koutný	Czechoslovakia	21.00
12	Hans Grieder	Switzerland	20.94
13	Bohumil Mořkovský	Czechoslovakia	20.93
14	Luigi Cambiaso	Italy	20.90
15	Francesco Martino	Italy	20.89
16	Giuseppe Paris	Italy	20.86
17	Léon Delsarte	France	20.70
18	Stanislav Indruch	Czechoslovakia	20.50
18	Eugène Cordonnier	France	20.50
20	Leon Štukelj	Yugoslavia	20.40
21	Georges Miez	Switzerland	20.36
22	Vittorio Lucchetti	Italy	20.33
23	Stanley Leigh	Great Britain	20.28
24	Ferdinando Mandrini	Italy	20.21
25	Jean Gounot	France	20.15
26	Albert Séguin	France	20.13
26	François Gangloff	France	20.13
26	Arthur Hermann	France	20.13
29	Joseph Huber	France	19.98
30	Al Jochim	United States	19.86
31	Carl Widmer	Switzerland	19.76
32	Frank Kriz	United States	19.67
33	André Higelin	France	19.48
34	Josip Primožič	Yugoslavia	19.42
35	Antoine Rebetez	Switzerland	19.08
36	Stane Hlastan	Yugoslavia	19.05
37	Stane Žilič	Yugoslavia	19.00
38	Jaakko Kunnas	Finland	18.98
39	Otto Pfister	Switzerland	18.96
40	Stane Derganc	Yugoslavia	18.92
41	Janez Porenta	Yugoslavia	18.90
42	John Pearson	United States	18.81
43	Eevert Kerttula	Finland	18.63
44	Curtis Rottman	United States	18.54
45	Charles Quaino	Luxembourg	18.50
46	Frank Safandra	United States	18.35
47	Luigi Maiocco	Italy	18.28
47	Albert Neumann	Luxembourg	18.28
49	Frank Hawkins	Great Britain	18.20
49	Harold Brown	Great Britain	18.20
51	Rastko Poljšak	Yugoslavia	18.00
52	Théo Jeitz	Luxembourg	17.30
53	Edward Leigh	Great Britain	17.21
54	Akseli Roine	Finland	17.03
54	Émile Munhofen	Luxembourg	17.03
56	Mikko Hämäläinen	Finland	17.01
57	Mihael Oswald	Yugoslavia	16.85
58	Henry Finchett	Great Britain	16.83
59	Mathias Weishaupt	Luxembourg	16.70
60	Otto Suhonen	Finland	16.63
61	Thomas Hopkins	Great Britain	16.20
62	Mathias Erang	Luxembourg	15.90
63	Aarne Roine	Finland	15.62
64	John Mais	United States	15.07
65	Rudolph Novak	United States	14.90
66	Max Wandrer	United States	14.89
67	Pierre Tolar	Luxembourg	14.75
68	Jacques Palzer	Luxembourg	13.80
69	Väinö Karonen	Finland	13.57
70	Samuel Humphreys	Great Britain	12.36
71	Albert Spencer	Great Britain	11.90
72	Eetu Kostamo	Finland	10.13
