= Gymnastics at the 1924 Summer Olympics – Men's rings =

Olympic gymnastics event

Men's rings at the Games of the VIII Olympiad
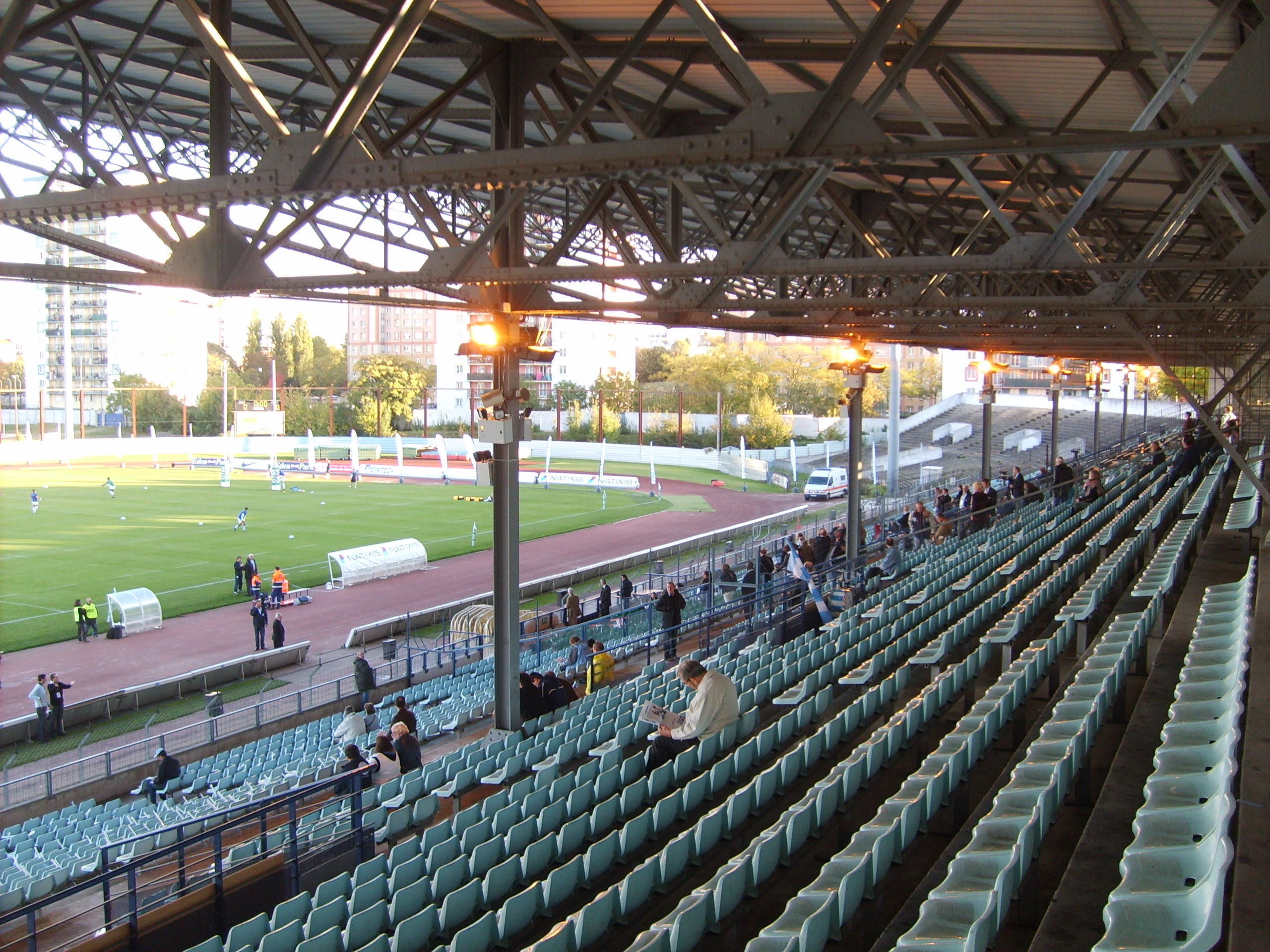
- Stade Olympique Yves-du-Manoir (2009)
- Venue: Stade Olympique
- Date: July 19, 1924
- Competitors: 70 from 9 nations
- Winning score: 21.553

Medalists
| 1st place, gold medalist(s) | | Francesco Martino; Italy |
| 2nd place, silver medalist(s) | | Robert Pražák; Czechoslovakia |
| 3rd place, bronze medalist(s) | | Ladislav Vácha; Czechoslovakia |

The men's rings event was part of the gymnastics programme at the 1924 Summer Olympics. It was one of nine gymnastics events and it was contested for the third time after 1896 and 1904. The competition was held on Saturday, July 19, 1924. Seventy gymnasts from nine nations competed, with each nation having an 8-gymnast team (with 2 non-starters). The event was won by Francesco Martino of Italy, the nation's first medal in the event. Robert Pražák and Ladislav Vácha of Czechoslovakia earned silver and bronze, respectively.

== Background ==
This was the third appearance of the event, which is one of the five apparatus events held every time there were apparatus events at the Summer Olympics (no apparatus events were held in 1900, 1908, 1912, or 1920). The 1922 world championship had resulted in a four-way tie among gymnasts from Czechoslovakia and Yugoslavia; Leon Štukelj was the only one of the four to compete at the 1924 Games.

The United States was the only nation that had previously competed, in 1904. The other eight nations (Czechoslovakia, Finland, France, Great Britain, Italy, Luxembourg, Switzerland, and Yugoslavia) were competing for the first time.

== Competition format ==
Each gymnast performed a compulsory exercise and a voluntary exercise. These two exercises were 2 of the 11 components of the individual all-around score, and thus were also included in the team all-around score. Each exercise had a maximum possible score of 11, with half a point each for the approach and dismount and up to 10 points for the routine.

== Schedule ==
| Date | Time | Round |
|---|---|---|
| Wednesday, 23 July 1924 | | Final |

== Results ==
| Rank | Gymnast | Nation | Compulsory | Voluntary | Total |
|---|---|---|---|---|---|
| 1st place, gold medalist(s) | Francesco Martino | Italy | 10.72 | 10.833 | 21.553 |
| 2nd place, silver medalist(s) | Robert Pražák | Czechoslovakia | 10.60 | 10.883 | 21.483 |
| 3rd place, bronze medalist(s) | Ladislav Vácha | Czechoslovakia | 10.43 | 11.00 | 21.43 |
| 4 | Leon Štukelj | Yugoslavia | 10.33 | 11.00 | 21.33 |
| 5 | Bedřich Šupčík | Czechoslovakia | 10.27 | 10.85 | 21.12 |
| 6 | Bohumil Mořkovský | Czechoslovakia | 10.33 | 10.75 | 21.08 |
| 7 | Jan Koutný | Czechoslovakia | 10.47 | 10.583 | 21.053 |
| 8 | Ferdinando Mandrini | Italy | 10.36 | 10.583 | 20.943 |
| 9 | Vittorio Lucchetti | Italy | 10.83 | 10.083 | 20.913 |
| 10 | Eugène Cordonnier | France | 10.40 | 10.50 | 20.90 |
| 11 | Miroslav Klinger | Czechoslovakia | 10.23 | 10.50 | 20.73 |
| 12 | Albert Séguin | France | 10.00 | 10.633 | 20.633 |
| 13 | François Gangloff | France | 10.22 | 10.383 | 20.603 |
| 14 | Léon Delsarte | France | 10.00 | 10.566 | 20.566 |
| 15 | Mario Lertora | Italy | 10.25 | 10.083 | 20.333 |
| 16 | Giorgio Zampori | Italy | 10.33 | 9.916 | 20.246 |
| 17 | Luigi Cambiaso | Italy | 9.98 | 10.00 | 19.98 |
| 18 | Giuseppe Paris | Italy | 10.16 | 9.583 | 19.743 |
| 19 | Jean Gounot | France | 9.00 | 10.73 | 19.73 |
| 20 | Arthur Hermann | France | 9.32 | 10.383 | 19.703 |
| 21 | Janez Porenta | Yugoslavia | 9.41 | 10.15 | 19.56 |
| 22 | Luigi Maiocco | Italy | 10.25 | 0.083 | 19.333 |
| 23 | Mihael Oswald | Yugoslavia | 9.16 | 10.00 | 19.16 |
| 24 | Joseph Huber | France | 9.00 | 10.033 | 19.033 |
| 25 | Stanley Leigh | Great Britain | 10.00 | 8.666 | 18.666 |
| 26 | Edward Leigh | Great Britain | 9.50 | 9.00 | 18.50 |
| 27 | Stane Derganc | Yugoslavia | 9.16 | 9.333 | 18.493 |
| 28 | Stane Žilič | Yugoslavia | 8.50 | 9.733 | 18.233 |
| 29 | Al Jochim | United States | 10.08 | 8.00 | 18.08 |
| 30 | Antoine Rebetez | Switzerland | 9.42 | 8.50 | 17.92 |
| 31 | André Higelin | France | 8.42 | 9.45 | 17.87 |
| 32 | Jean Gutweninger | Switzerland | 9.68 | 8.166 | 17.846 |
| 33 | Henry Finchett | Great Britain | 9.76 | 8.00 | 17.760 |
| 34 | Charles Quaino | Luxembourg | 8.33 | 9.333 | 17.663 |
| 35 | Mathias Erang | Luxembourg | 8.50 | 8.083 | 17.583 |
| 35 | Frank Safandra | United States | 9.00 | 8.583 | 17.583 |
| 37 | August Güttinger | Switzerland | 9.32 | 8.25 | 17.57 |
| 38 | Stane Hlastan | Yugoslavia | 8.91 | 8.633 | 17.543 |
| 39 | Mathias Weishaupt | Luxembourg | 8.43 | 9.066 | 17.496 |
| 40 | Josef Wilhelm | Switzerland | 9.72 | 7.916 | 17.386 |
| 41 | Otto Pfister | Switzerland | 9.08 | 8.166 | 17.246 |
| 42 | Pierre Tolar | Luxembourg | 8.60 | 8.583 | 17.183 |
| 43 | Hans Grieder | Switzerland | 9.82 | 7.25 | 17.07 |
| 44 | Carl Widmer | Switzerland | 9.08 | 7.916 | 16.996 |
| 45 | Georges Miez | Switzerland | 8.77 | 7.916 | 16.686 |
| 46 | Théo Jeitz | Luxembourg | 7.50 | 8.25 | 15.750 |
| 47 | Harold Brown | Great Britain | 9.70 | 5.833 | 15.533 |
| 48 | Samuel Humphreys | Great Britain | 8.66 | 6.833 | 15.493 |
| 49 | Frank Kriz | United States | 7.83 | 7.583 | 15.413 |
| 50 | Rastko Poljšak | Yugoslavia | 7.00 | 8.333 | 15.333 |
| 51 | Rudolph Novak | United States | 7.66 | 7.50 | 15.16 |
| 52 | Émile Munhofen | Luxembourg | 7.60 | 7.50 | 15.10 |
| 53 | Jacques Palzer | Luxembourg | 6.66 | 8.25 | 14.91 |
| 54 | Albert Neumann | Luxembourg | 6.83 | 7.833 | 14.663 |
| 55 | Josip Primožič | Yugoslavia | 6.00 | 8.583 | 14.583 |
| 56 | Frank Hawkins | Great Britain | 8.00 | 6.50 | 14.50 |
| 57 | Thomas Hopkins | Great Britain | 8.00 | 5.75 | 13.75 |
| 58 | John Pearson | United States | 6.33 | 7.416 | 13.746 |
| 59 | Aarne Roine | Finland | 5.83 | 7.00 | 12.83 |
| 60 | Jaakko Kunnas | Finland | 6.00 | 6.75 | 12.75 |
| 61 | Eevert Kerttula | Finland | 5.00 | 7.50 | 12.50 |
| 62 | John Mais | United States | 5.66 | 6.50 | 12.16 |
| 63 | Curtis Rottman | United States | 5.66 | 6.25 | 11.91 |
| 64 | Albert Spencer | Great Britain | 6.50 | 5.25 | 11.75 |
| 65 | Mikko Hämäläinen | Finland | 5.16 | 6.00 | 11.16 |
| 66 | Akseli Roine | Finland | 3.83 | 6.25 | 10.08 |
| 67 | Max Wandrer | United States | 3.50 | 6.50 | 10.00 |
| 68 | Eetu Kostamo | Finland | 4.16 | 5.50 | 9.66 |
| 69 | Väinö Karonen | Finland | 3.66 | 5.50 | 9.16 |
| 69 | Otto Suhonen | Finland | 3.16 | 6.00 | 9.16 |
