= Gymnastics at the 1924 Summer Olympics – Men's horizontal bar =

Olympic gymnastics event

Men's horizontal bar at the Games of the VIII Olympiad
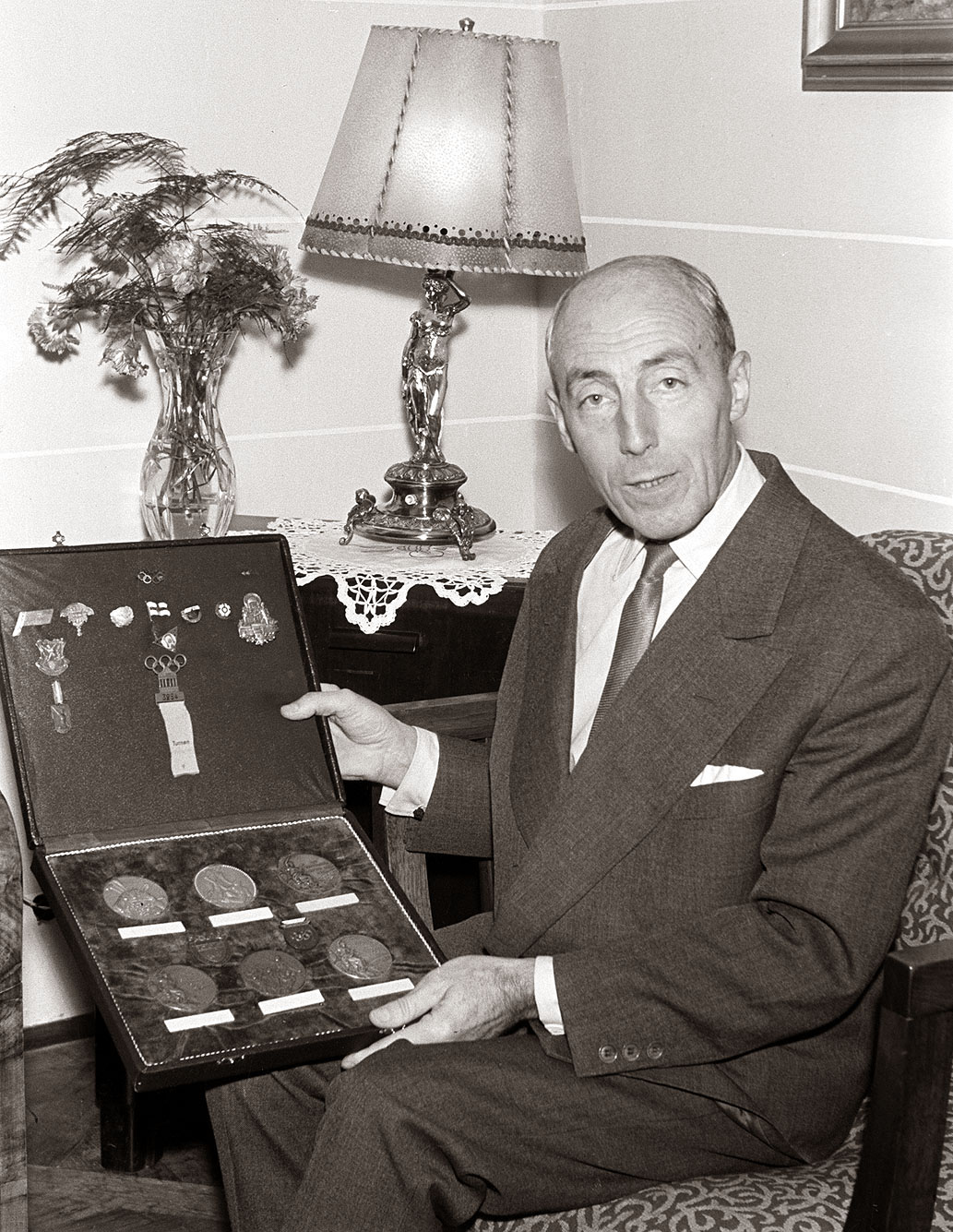
- Leon Štukelj (1958)
- Venue: Stade Olympique Yves-du-Manoir
- Date: July 19, 1924
- Competitors: 72 from 9 nations

Medalists
1st place, gold medalist(s)		Leon Štukelj	Yugoslavia
2nd place, silver medalist(s)		Jean Gutweninger	Switzerland
3rd place, bronze medalist(s)		André Higelin	France

The men's horizontal bar event was part of the gymnastics programme at the 1924 Summer Olympics. It was one of nine gymnastics events and it was contested for the third time after 1896 and 1904. The competition was held on Saturday, July 19, 1924. Seventy-two gymnasts from nine nations competed. The event was won by Leon Štukelj of Yugoslavia, with Jean Gutweninger of Switzerland taking silver and André Higelin of France bronze. It was the first medal in the horizontal bar for each of those nations.

== Background ==
This was the third appearance of the event, which is one of the five apparatus events held every time there were apparatus events at the Summer Olympics (no apparatus events were held in 1900, 1908, 1912, or 1920). The 1922 world championship had ended in a three-way tie; two of the winners were competing in Paris: Leon Štukelj of Yugoslavia and Miroslav Klinger of Czechoslovakia.

Two nations had previously competed, Switzerland in 1896 and the United States in 1904. The other seven nations (Czechoslovakia, Finland, France, Great Britain, Italy, Luxembourg, and Yugoslavia) were competing for the first time.

== Competition format ==
Each gymnast performed a compulsory exercise and a voluntary exercise. These two exercises were 2 of the 11 components of the individual all-around score, and thus were also included in the team all-around score. Each exercise had a maximum possible score of 11, with half a point each for the approach and dismount and up to 10 points for the routine.

== Schedule ==
Date	Time	Round
Saturday, 19 July 1924		Final

== Results ==
Rank	Gymnast	Nation	Total
1st place, gold medalist(s)	Leon Štukelj	Yugoslavia	19.730
2nd place, silver medalist(s)	Jean Gutweninger	Switzerland	19.236
3rd place, bronze medalist(s)	André Higelin	France	19.163
4	Antoine Rebetez	Switzerland	19.053
5	Georges Miez	Switzerland	19.050
6	Jean Gounot	France	19.043
7	François Gangloff	France	18.933
8	August Güttinger	Switzerland	18.886
9	Robert Pražák	Czechoslovakia	18.730
10	Léon Delsarte	France	18.633
11	Francesco Martino	Italy	18.386
12	Mario Lertora	Italy	18.366
13	Stanley Leigh	Great Britain	18.350
14	Ferdinando Mandrini	Italy	18.120
15	Josef Kos	Czechoslovakia	17.960
16	Bedřich Šupčík	Czechoslovakia	17.860
17	Arthur Hermann	France	17.503
18	Frank Kriz	United States	17.500
19	Stanislav Indruch	Czechoslovakia	17.430
20	Vittorio Lucchetti	Italy	17.270
21	Luigi Cambiaso	Italy	17.180
22	Josef Wilhelm	Switzerland	17.150
23	Al Jochim	United States	17.060
24	Hans Grieder	Switzerland	16.946
25	Otto Pfister	Switzerland	16.920
26	Miroslav Klinger	Czechoslovakia	16.470
27	Giuseppe Paris	Italy	16.356
28	Stane Žilič	Yugoslavia	16.330
28	Curtis Rottman	United States	16.330
30	Giorgio Zampori	Italy	16.203
31	Carl Widmer	Switzerland	16.190
32	John Pearson	United States	15.990
33	Eugène Cordonnier	France	15.886
34	Otto Suhonen	Finland	15.853
35	Jan Koutný	Czechoslovakia	15.716
36	Albert Séguin	France	15.683
37	Väinö Karonen	Finland	15.420
38	Stane Hlastan	Yugoslavia	15.066
39	Ladislav Vácha	Czechoslovakia	14.700
40	Luigi Maiocco	Italy	14.663
41	Bohumil Mořkovský	Czechoslovakia	14.563
42	Mihael Oswald	Yugoslavia	14.280
43	Harold Brown	Great Britain	14.206
44	Janez Porenta	Yugoslavia	14.166
45	John Mais	United States	13.930
46	Jaakko Kunnas	Finland	13.583
47	Rastko Poljšak	Yugoslavia	13.536
48	Josip Primožič	Yugoslavia	13.460
49	Aarne Roine	Finland	13.280
50	Frank Safandra	United States	12.900
51	Albert Spencer	Great Britain	12.893
52	Théo Jeitz	Luxembourg	12.850
53	Joseph Huber	France	12.686
54	Henry Finchett	Great Britain	12.290
55	Eevert Kerttula	Finland	12.273
56	Akseli Roine	Finland	12.233
57	Edward Leigh	Great Britain	12.120
58	Stane Derganc	Yugoslavia	12.100
59	Mikko Hämäläinen	Finland	11.873
60	Charles Quaino	Luxembourg	11.646
61	Eetu Kostamo	Finland	11.253
62	Albert Neumann	Luxembourg	11.243
63	Samuel Humphreys	Great Britain	10.933
64	Thomas Hopkins	Great Britain	10.840
65	Émile Munhofen	Luxembourg	10.366
66	Max Wandrer	United States	10.240
67	Mathias Erang	Luxembourg	9.833
68	Frank Hawkins	Great Britain	9.733
69	Rudolph Novak	United States	9.703
70	Jacques Palzer	Luxembourg	9.463
71	Mathias Weishaupt	Luxembourg	8.550
72	Pierre Tolar	Luxembourg	7.800
