= Gymnastics at the 1924 Summer Olympics – Men's pommel horse =

Olympic gymnastics event

Men's pommel horse at the Games of the VIII Olympiad
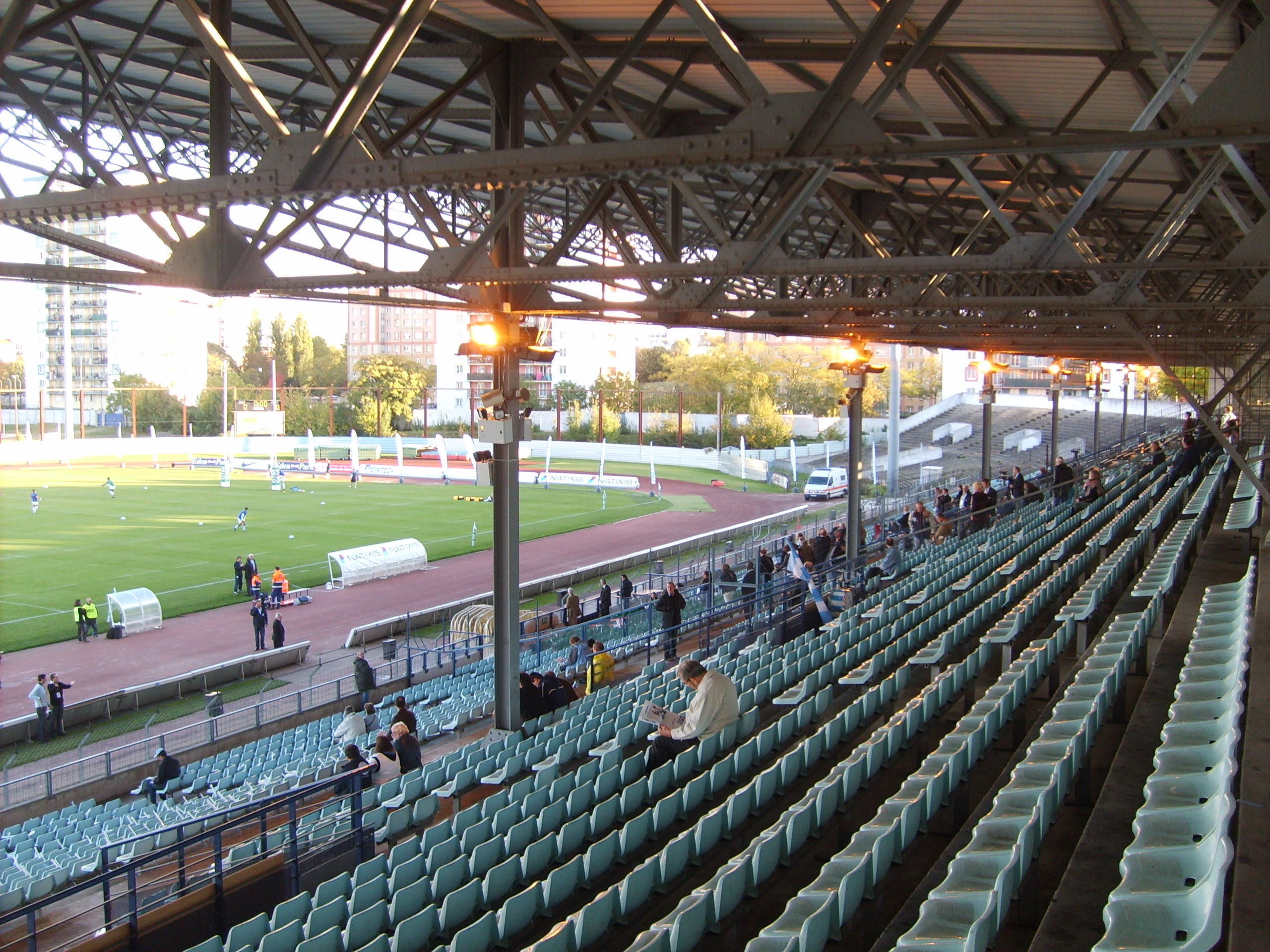
- Stade Olympique Yves-du-Manoir (2009)
- Venue: Stade Olympique Yves-du-Manoir
- Date: July 23, 1924
- Competitors: 70 from 9 nations
- Winning score: 21.230

Medalists
1st place, gold medalist(s)		Josef Wilhelm; Switzerland
2nd place, silver medalist(s)		Jean Gutweninger; Switzerland
3rd place, bronze medalist(s)		Antoine Rebetez; Switzerland

The men's pommel horse event was part of the gymnastics programme at the 1924 Summer Olympics. It was one of nine gymnastics events and it was contested for the third time after 1896 and 1904. The competition was held on Wednesday, July 23, 1924. Seventy gymnasts from nine nations competed, with each nation having an 8-gymnast team (with 2 non-starters). The event was won by Josef Wilhelm of Switzerland, the nation's second victory in the event (after 1896). With Swiss gymnasts Jean Gutweninger and Antoine Rebetez taking silver and bronze, respectively, it was the second consecutive appearance of the event in which the event's medals were swept (United States, 1904).

== Background ==
This was the third appearance of the event, which is one of the five apparatus events held every time there were apparatus events at the Summer Olympics (no apparatus events were held in 1900, 1908, 1912, or 1920). The reigning (1922) world champion was Miroslav Klinger of Czechoslovakia.

Two nations were competing in the event for the second time: Switzerland had previously competed in 1896 and the United States had competed in 1904. The other seven nations (Czechoslovakia, Finland, France, Great Britain, Italy, Luxembourg, and Yugoslavia) were competing for the first time.

== Competition format ==
Each gymnast performed a compulsory exercise and a voluntary exercise. These two exercises were 2 of the 11 components of the individual all-around score, and thus were also included in the team all-around score. Each exercise had a maximum possible score of 11, with half a point each for the approach and dismount and up to 10 points for the routine.

== Schedule ==
Date	Time	Round
Wednesday, 23 July 1924		Final

== Results ==
Rank	Gymnast	Nation	Compulsory	Voluntary	Total
1st place, gold medalist(s)	Josef Wilhelm	Switzerland	10.53	10.70	21.23
2nd place, silver medalist(s)	Jean Gutweninger	Switzerland	10.40	10.73	21.13
3rd place, bronze medalist(s)	Antoine Rebetez	Switzerland	10.00	10.73	20.73
4	Carl Widmer	Switzerland	10.40	10.10	20.50
5	Giuseppe Paris	Italy	10.00	10.10	20.10
6	Stane Derganc	Yugoslavia	10.70	9.23	19.93
7	Miroslav Klinger	Czechoslovakia	10.67	9.00	19.67
8	August Güttinger	Switzerland	9.53	10.07	19.60
9	Arthur Hermann	France	10.33	9.13	19.46
10	Leon Štukelj	Yugoslavia	10.17	9.20	19.37
11	Eugène Cordonnier	France	10.36	8.83	19.19
12	Al Jochim	United States	9.90	9.10	19.00
13	Robert Pražák	Czechoslovakia	10.47	8.50	18.97
14	Georges Miez	Switzerland	8.46	10.37	18.83
15	Hans Grieder	Switzerland	9.07	9.37	18.44
16	Otto Pfister	Switzerland	8.26	10.17	18.43
17	Ladislav Vácha	Czechoslovakia	9.80	8.53	18.33
18	Janez Porenta	Yugoslavia	10.00	8.27	18.27
19	Vittorio Lucchetti	Italy	8.06	10.13	18.19
20	Luigi Maiocco	Italy	8.13	10.00	18.13
21	Frank Kriz	United States	9.40	8.53	17.93
22	Jan Koutný	Czechoslovakia	9.77	8.10	17.87
23	Giorgio Zampori	Italy	7.73	10.00	17.73
24	Bedřich Šupčík	Czechoslovakia	10.63	6.90	17.53
25	Stanley Leigh	Great Britain	8.49	9.00	17.49
26	Frank Safanda	United States	10.00	7.46	17.46
27	Jean Gounot	France	9.03	8.27	17.30
28	Francesco Martino	Italy	7.82	9.47	17.29
29	Mario Lertora	Italy	7.66	9.50	17.16
30	Ferdinando Mandrini	Italy	8.33	8.73	17.06
31	Bohumil Mořkovský	Czechoslovakia	9.46	7.33	16.79
32	François Gangloff	France	7.64	9.13	16.77
33	Léon Delsarte	France	8.30	8.27	16.57
34	Albert Séguin	France	10.53	5.90	16.43
34	Joseph Huber	France	8.93	7.50	16.43
36	Stane Hlastan	Yugoslavia	8.86	7.47	16.33
37	Mihael Oswald	Yugoslavia	8.80	7.33	16.13
38	Stane Žilič	Yugoslavia	8.51	7.23	15.74
39	Rudolph Novak	United States	7.73	7.70	15.43
40	Curtis Rottman	United States	7.666	7.66	15.326
41	Henry Finchett	Great Britain	7.87	7.43	15.30
42	Rastko Poljšak	Yugoslavia	8.66	6.56	15.22
43	John Pearson	United States	6.766	8.33	15.096
44	Luigi Cambiaso	Italy	5.37	9.37	14.74
45	Harold Brown	Great Britain	6.54	7.83	14.37
46	Albert Spencer	Great Britain	7.23	6.83	14.06
47	Frank Hawkins	Great Britain	6.803	6.46	13.263
48	Edward Leigh	Great Britain	6.47	6.73	13.20
49	André Higelin	France	6.96	5.83	12.79
50	John Mais	United States	5.57	7.20	12.77
51	Josip Primožič	Yugoslavia	6.50	6.13	12.63
52	Max Wandrer	United States	4.70	6.99	11.69
53	Thomas Hopkins	Great Britain	4.55	6.66	11.21
54	Samuel Humphreys	Great Britain	6.07	5.03	11.10
55	Charles Quaino	Luxembourg	5.56	5.00	10.56
56	Mikko Hämäläinen	Finland	4.66	5.30	9.96
57	Otto Suhonen	Finland	3.97	5.90	9.87
58	Väinö Karonen	Finland	4.90	4.80	9.70
59	Aarne Roine	Finland	4.33	4.80	9.13
60	Eevert Kerttula	Finland	4.33	4.46	8.79
61	Jaakko Kunnas	Finland	4.43	4.23	8.66
62	Eetu Kostamo	Finland	3.83	4.80	8.63
63	Mathias Erang	Luxembourg	4.39	4.00	8.39
64	Akseli Roine	Finland	3.20	4.87	8.07
65	Jacques Palzer	Luxembourg	2.40	5.00	7.40
66	Albert Neumann	Luxembourg	3.00	4.00	7.00
67	Émile Munhofen	Luxembourg	2.80	3.80	6.60
68	Mathias Weishaupt	Luxembourg	2.52	4.00	6.52
69	Pierre Tolar	Luxembourg	2.40	3.50	5.90
70	Théo Jeitz	Luxembourg	2.40	3.00	5.40
—	Stanislav Indruch	Czechoslovakia	DNS		
—	Josef Kos	Czechoslovakia	DNS		
