= Gymnastics at the 1924 Summer Olympics – Men's rope climbing =

Olympic gymnastics event

Men's rope climbing at the Games of the VIII Olympiad
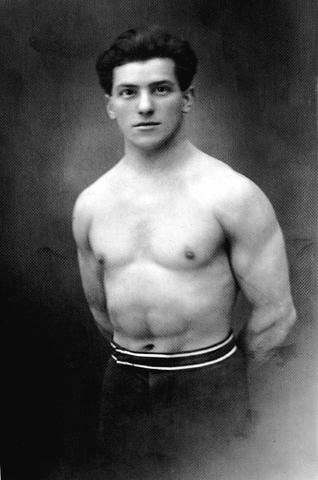
- Bedřich Šupčík
- Venue: Stade Olympique
- Date: July 20, 1924
- Competitors: 70 from 9 nations
- Winning time: 7.2 seconds

Medalists
1st place, gold medalist(s)		Bedřich Šupčík; Czechoslovakia
2nd place, silver medalist(s)		Albert Séguin; France
3rd place, bronze medalist(s)		August Güttinger; Switzerland
3rd place, bronze medalist(s)		Ladislav Vácha; Czechoslovakia

The men's rope climbing event was part of the gymnastics programme at the 1924 Summer Olympics. It was one of nine gymnastics events and it was contested for the third time after 1896 and 1904. The competition was held on Sunday, July 20, 1924. Seventy gymnasts from nine nations competed. The event was won by Bedřich Šupčík of Czechoslovakia. Albert Séguin of France took silver, while August Güttinger of Switzerland and Ladislav Vácha tied for bronze. All three medaling nations were making their debut in rope climbing, so they were the first medals for each in the event.

== Background ==
This was the third appearance of the event, which was held four times. The event had been held in 1896 and 1904 and would appear again in 1932. The event was an unusual one, not one of the standard apparatus competitions held at the world championships. The Official Report commented that it appeared some nations had considered the event less important than the other apparatus events on the 1924 programme.

The United States and Great Britain were the only two nations to have competed in one of the prior rope climbing competitions (in 1904 and 1896, respectively); the other seven nations all made their debut in the event.

== Competition format ==
The rope climbing event was judged on time, with the fastest to reach the top winning.

The times were also converted into points for use in the individual and team all-around scores, as the rope climbing was one of the 11 components of the 1924 all-around competition.

The points were as follows:

- A time of 9.0 seconds or faster was worth 10 points.
- Each 1/5 second between 9.0 seconds and 10.0 seconds reduced the score by 1 point.
- Each 2/5 second slower than 10.0 seconds reduced the score by 1 point.

Thus, a time of 10.0 seconds was worth 5 points, while any gymnast taking 12.0 seconds or more would receive zero points for the exercise.

== Schedule ==
Date	Time	Round
Sunday, 20 July 1924		Final

== Results ==
Rank	Gymnast	Nation	Score	Time
1st place, gold medalist(s)	Bedřich Šupčík	Czechoslovakia	10	7.2
2nd place, silver medalist(s)	Albert Séguin	France	10	7.4
3rd place, bronze medalist(s)	August Güttinger	Switzerland	10	7.8
3rd place, bronze medalist(s)	Ladislav Vácha	Czechoslovakia	10	7.8
5	Stane Žilič	Yugoslavia	10	8.0
6	Jean Gounot	France	10	8.4
6	Arthur Hermann	France	10	8.4
6	Janez Porenta	Yugoslavia	10	8.4
6	Frank Kriz	United States	10	8.4
10	Mario Lertora	Italy	10	8.6
10	Leon Štukelj	Yugoslavia	10	8.6
10	John Pearson	United States	10	8.6
13	Francesco Martino	Italy	10	8.8
13	Léon Delsarte	France	10	8.8
13	Frank Safandra	United States	10	8.8
13	Max Wandrer	United States	10	8.8
13	Robert Pražák	Czechoslovakia	10	8.8
18	Luigi Cambiaso	Italy	10	9.0
18	Vittorio Lucchetti	Italy	10	9.0
18	Ferdinando Mandrini	Italy	10	9.0
18	Hans Grieder	Switzerland	10	9.0
18	Bohumil Mořkovský	Czechoslovakia	10	9.0
23	Carl Widmer	Switzerland	9	9.2
24	Giuseppe Paris	Italy	8	9.4
24	Eugène Cordonnier	France	8	9.4
24	Stane Derganc	Yugoslavia	8	9.4
24	Mihael Oswald	Yugoslavia	8	9.4
24	Harold Brown	Great Britain	8	9.4
24	Miroslav Klinger	Czechoslovakia	8	9.4
24	Jan Koutný	Czechoslovakia	8	9.4
31	Georges Miez	Switzerland	7	9.6
31	Otto Pfister	Switzerland	7	9.6
31	Rudolph Novak	United States	7	9.6
31	Frank Hawkins	Great Britain	7	9.6
35	Giorgio Zampori	Italy	6	9.8
35	André Higelin	France	6	9.8
35	Jean Gutweninger	Switzerland	6	9.8
35	Otto Suhonen	Finland	6	9.8
39	Luigi Maiocco	Italy	5	10.0
39	François Gangloff	France	5	10.0
41	Joseph Huber	France	5	10.2
41	Jaakko Kunnas	Finland	5	10.2
41	Akseli Roine	Finland	5	10.2
41	Antoine Rebetez	Switzerland	5	10.2
45	Josef Wilhelm	Switzerland	4	10.4
45	Rastko Poljšak	Yugoslavia	4	10.4
47	Josip Primožič	Yugoslavia	3	10.8
47	Väinö Karonen	Finland	3	10.8
47	Pierre Tolar	Luxembourg	3	10.8
50	Samuel Humphreys	Great Britain	2	11.2
51	Curtis Rottman	United States	2	11.4
51	Henry Finchett	Great Britain	2	11.4
51	Thomas Hopkins	Great Britain	2	11.4
51	Mathias Weishaupt	Luxembourg	2	11.4
55	Al Jochim	United States	2	11.6
55	John Mais	United States	2	11.6
55	Stanley Leigh	Great Britain	2	11.6
58	Albert Spencer	Great Britain	1	11.8
58	Eevert Kerttula	Finland	1	11.8
60	Eetu Kostamo	Finland	0	12.0
60	Charles Quaino	Luxembourg	0	12.0
62	Edward Leigh	Great Britain	0	12.2
63	Mikko Hämäläinen	Finland	0	12.6
63	Aarne Roine	Finland	0	12.6
65	Albert Neumann	Luxembourg	0	12.8
66	Stane Hlastan	Yugoslavia	0	13.4
67	Jacques Palzer	Luxembourg	0	14.2
68	Émile Munhofen	Luxembourg	0	14.6
69	Théo Jeitz	Luxembourg	0	15.0
69	Mathias Erang	Luxembourg	0	15.0
—	Stanislav Indruch	Czechoslovakia	—	DNS
—	Josef Kos	Czechoslovakia	—	DNS
