= Gymnastics at the 1924 Summer Olympics – Men's sidehorse vault =

1924 Olympic event

Men's sidehorse vault at the Games of the VIII Olympiad
- Venue: Stade Olympique
- Date: July 22, 1924
- Competitors: 70 from 9 nations

Medalists
1st place, gold medalist(s)		Albert Séguin	France
2nd place, silver medalist(s)		Jean Gounot	France
2nd place, silver medalist(s)		François Gangloff	France

The men's sidehorse vault event was part of the gymnastics programme at the 1924 Summer Olympics. It was one of nine gymnastics events. The competition was held on Tuesday, July 22, 1924.

Seventy gymnasts from nine nations competed. The "sidehorse vault" (French: saut de cheval en largeur) event used a vaulting horse set sideways (perpendicular to the approach) for gymnasts to turn and make a single flip. This was the only time that this event was held. The French achieved a podium sweep, which would not happen again at the Olympics until the 2014 Winter Olympics men's ski cross event.

== Results ==
Place	Gymnast	Total
1	Albert Séguin (FRA)	10.00
2	Jean Gounot (FRA)	9.93
2	François Gangloff (FRA)	9.93
4	Stane Hlastan (YUG)	9.86
5	Stane Derganc (YUG)	9.85
6	Ladislav Vácha (TCH)	9.83
6	Bedřich Šupčík (TCH)	9.83
8	Eugène Cordonnier (FRA)	9.80
8	Frank Kriz (USA)	9.80
8	Mathias Erang (LUX)	9.80
8	Robert Pražák (TCH)	9.80
12	Jan Koutný (TCH)	9.75
12	Miroslav Klinger (TCH)	9.75
14	André Higelin (FRA)	9.70
15	Max Wandrer (USA)	9.65
16	Charles Quaino (LUX)	9.62
17	Leon Štukelj (YUG)	9.60
18	Joseph Huber (FRA)	9.57
19	Janez Porenta (YUG)	9.516
20	Al Jochim (USA)	9.51
21	Ferdinando Mandrini (ITA)	9.50
21	Léon Delsarte (FRA)	9.50
23	Bohumil Mořkovský (TCH)	9.45
24	Giorgio Zampori (ITA)	9.42
25	Stanley Leigh (GBR)	9.41
26	John Mais (USA)	9.26
26	Curtis Rottman (USA)	9.26
28	Vittorio Lucchetti (ITA)	9.20
29	Hans Grieder (SUI)	9.17
30	Luigi Cambiaso (ITA)	9.15
31	Thomas Hopkins (GBR)	9.13
32	Mario Lertora (ITA)	9.11
33	Henry Finchett (GBR)	9.08
34	Josef Wilhelm (SUI)	9.06
34	Stane Žilič (YUG)	9.06
36	Giuseppe Paris (ITA)	9.03
37	Arthur Hermann (FRA)	9.00
38	Mihael Oswald (YUG)	8.93
39	Otto Pfister (SUI)	8.86
40	Théo Jeitz (LUX)	8.83
41	John Pearson (USA)	8.71
42	Georges Miez (SUI)	8.70
43	Émile Munhofen (LUX)	8.68
44	Francesco Martino (ITA)	8.58
45	Josip Primožič (YUG)	8.55
46	Jean Gutweninger (SUI)	8.50
46	Eevert Kerttula (FIN)	8.50
48	August Güttinger (SUI)	8.41
49	Rudolph Novak (USA)	8.40
50	Luigi Maiocco (ITA)	8.33
50	Otto Suhonen (FIN)	8.33
50	Jacques Palzer (LUX)	8.33
50	Albert Neumann (LUX)	8.33
54	Edward Leigh (GBR)	8.17
54	Samuel Humphreys (GBR)	8.17
56	Pierre Tolar (LUX)	8.08
57	Mikko Hämäläinen (FIN)	8.00
58	Rastko Poljšak (YUG)	7.96
59	Frank Hawkins (GBR)	7.83
59	Harold Brown (GBR)	7.83
59	Väinö Karonen (FIN)	7.83
62	Antoine Rebetez (SUI)	7.80
63	Carl Widmer (SUI)	7.66
64	Eetu Kostamo (FIN)	7.60
65	Albert Spencer (GBR)	7.50
66	Aarne Roine (FIN)	7.43
67	Mathias Weishaupt (LUX)	7.33
68	Jaakko Kunnas (FIN)	7.27
69	Akseli Roine (FIN)	6.87
70	Frank Safandra (USA)	3.00
