= Gymnastics at the 1924 Summer Olympics – Men's team =

Men's team gymnastics at the Games of the VIII Olympiad
- Venue: Stade Olympique
- Dates: July 17–23, 1924
- Competitors: 72 from 9 nations

Medalists
1st place, gold medalist(s)		Luigi Cambiaso, Mario Lertora, Vittorio Lucchetti, Luigi Maiocco, Ferdinando Mandrini, Francesco Martino, Giuseppe Paris, Giorgio Zampori; Italy
2nd place, silver medalist(s)		Eugène Cordonnier, Léon Delsarte, François Gangloff, Jean Gounot, Arthur Hermann, André Higelin, Joseph Huber, Albert Séguin; France
3rd place, bronze medalist(s)		Hans Grieder, August Güttinger, Jean Gutweninger, Georges Miez, Otto Pfister, Antoine Rebetez, Carl Widmer, Josef Wilhelm; Switzerland

The men's team all-around event was part of the gymnastics programme at the 1924 Summer Olympics. It was one of nine gymnastics events and it was contested for the fifth time. The competition was held from Thursday, July 17, 1924, to Wednesday, July 23, 1924.

Seventy-two gymnasts from nine nations competed.

== Results ==
Place	Gymnast	Total	Individual		Points for maintaining the section							Accuracy
Place	Gymnast	Total	Score	Rank	Horizontal bar	Parallel bars	Rings	Rope climbing	Vault	Sidehorse vault	Pommel horse	Accuracy
1
1	Italy	839.058	805.058		2	2	2	2	2	2	2	20
1	Ferdinando Mandrini		105.583	4								
1	Mario Lertora		103.619	10								
1	Vittorio Lucchetti		102.803	12								
1	Francesco Martino		101.529	16								
1	Luigi Cambiaso		101.32	17								
1	Giuseppe Paris		101.169	18								
1	Giorgio Zampori		96.549	26								
1	Luigi Maiocco		92.486	33								
2
2	France	820.528	786.968		2	2	2	2	1.83	1.83	1.90	20
2	Jean Gounot		105.153	8								
2	Léon Delsarte		104.739	9								
2	Albert Séguin		102.326	15								
2	Eugène Cordonnier		99.906	21								
2	François Gangloff		98.796	23								
2	Arthur Hermann		95.796	27								
2	André Higelin		92.133	34								
2	Joseph Huber		88.119	39								
3
3	Switzerland	816.661	783.321		2	1.85	2	2	1.83	1.66	2	20
3	August Güttinger		105.153	8								
3	Jean Gutweninger		104.739	9								
3	Hans Grieder		102.326	15								
3	Georges Miez		99.906	21								
3	Josef Wilhelm		98.796	23								
3	Otto Pfister		95.796	27								
3	Carl Widmer		92.133	34								
3	Antoine Rebetez		88.119	39								
4
4	Yugoslavia	762.101	728.701		1.50	2	2	1.90	2	2	2	20
4	Leon Štukelj		110.37	1								
4	Janez Porenta		100.172	20								
4	Stane Žilič		95.523	29								
4	Stane Derganc		95.293	30								
4	Mihael Oswald		91.066	36								
4	Stane Hlastan		81.249	44								
4	Rastko Poljšak		77.665	45								
4	Josip Primožič		77.393	47								
5
5	United States	715.117	681.817		2	1.90	2	1.50	2	2	1.90	20
5	Frank Kriz		100.293	19								
5	Al Jochim		95.090	31								
5	John Pearson		89.852	37								
5	Frank Safandra		86.953	41								
5	Curtis Rottman		82.953	42								
5	Rudolph Novak		77.593	46								
5	Max Wandrer		76.320	48								
5	John Mais		72.770	53								
6
6	Great Britain	637.790	604.290		1.80	1.80	2	2	1.90	2	2	20
6	Stanley Leigh		91.266	35								
6	Harold Brown		87.059	40								
6	Henry Finchett		81.710	43								
6	Frank Hawkins		73.796	49								
6	Thomas Hopkins		72.350	54								
6	Edward Leigh		69.200	55								
6	Samuel Humphreys		64.656	64								
6	Albert Spencer		64.253	66								
7
7	Finland	554.948	521.998		2	1.75	2	2	2	1.50	1.70	20
7	Jaakko Kunnas		73.473	51								
7	Otto Suhonen		72.843	52								
7	Akseli Roine		66.503	56								
7	Aarne Roine		65.460	59								
7	Mikko Hämäläinen		65.233	61								
7	Väinö Karonen		65.180	63								
7	Eevert Kerttula		62.863	66								
7	Eetu Kostamo		50.443	70								
8
8	Luxembourg	548.129	514.529		1.80	2	2	2	2	2	1.80	20
8	Charles Quaino		73.569	50								
8	Théo Jeitz		65.980	57								
8	Émile Munhofen		65.556	58								
8	Mathias Erang		65.356	60								
8	Albert Neumann		65.196	62								
8	Jacques Palzer		61.563	67								
8	Pierre Tolar		58.713	68								
8	Mathias Weishaupt		58.596	69								
—
—	Czechoslovakia	DNF	-									
—	Robert Pražák		110.323	2								
—	Bedřich Šupčík		106.930	3								
—	Miroslav Klinger		105.500	5								
—	Ladislav Vácha		105.300	6								
—	Jan Koutný		103.359	11								
—	Bohumil Mořkovský		102.743	13								
—	Stanislav Indruch		-	-								
—	Josef Kos		-	-								
