= 1924 Summer Olympics medal table =

List of medals won by Olympic delegations at the Games of the VIII Olympiad

1924 Summer Olympics medals
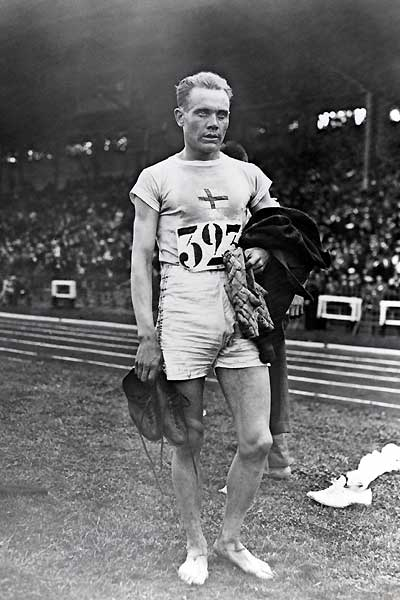
- Paavo Nurmi of Finland was an athlete with the most gold medals at the 1924 Summer Olympics, winning five golds in the sport of athletics.
- Location: Paris, France

Highlights
- Most gold medals: United States (45)
- Most total medals: United States (99)
- Medalling NOCs: 27

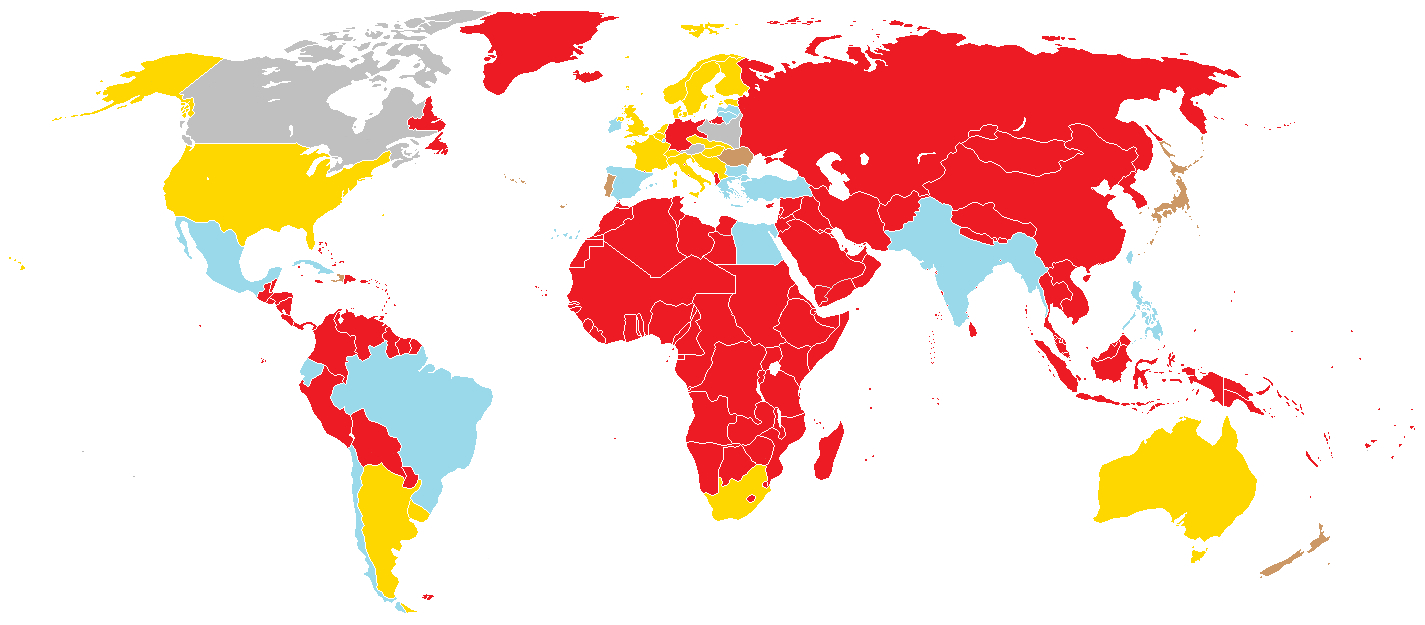
World map showing the medal achievements of each country during the 1924 Summer Olympics Legend: represents countries that won at least one gold medal. represents countries that won at least one silver medal but no gold medals. represents countries that won at least one bronze medal but no gold or silver medals. represents countries that did not win any medals. represents entities that did not participate in the 1924 Summer Olympics.

The 1924 Summer Olympics, officially known as the Games of the VIII Olympiad, was an international multi-sport event held in Paris, France, from 4 May to 27 July. A total of 3,089 athletes from 44 nations participated in 126 events in 17 sports across 23 different disciplines.

Overall, athletes from 27 nations received at least one medal, and 19 of them won at least one gold medal. Athletes from the United States won the most medals overall, with 99, and the most gold medals, with 45. Athletes from Finland came second in the medal table with 14 gold medals and 37 overall medals, while athletes from host nation France came third with 13 gold medals and 38 medals overall. Czechoslovakia's team won their nation's first Olympic gold medal. Teams from Argentina, Uruguay, and Yugoslavia won their nations' first Olympic gold medal and Olympic medal of any color. Meanwhile, teams from Haiti, Poland, Portugal, and Romania won their nations' first Olympic medals.

Middle-distance and long-distance runner Paavo Nurmi of Finland won the most gold medals for an individual at the Games and the most gold medals in athletics at a single Games, with five gold medals. Compatriot long-distance runner Ville Ritola won the most overall medals and the most medals in athletics at a single Games, winning six medals with four golds and two silvers.

== Medal table ==
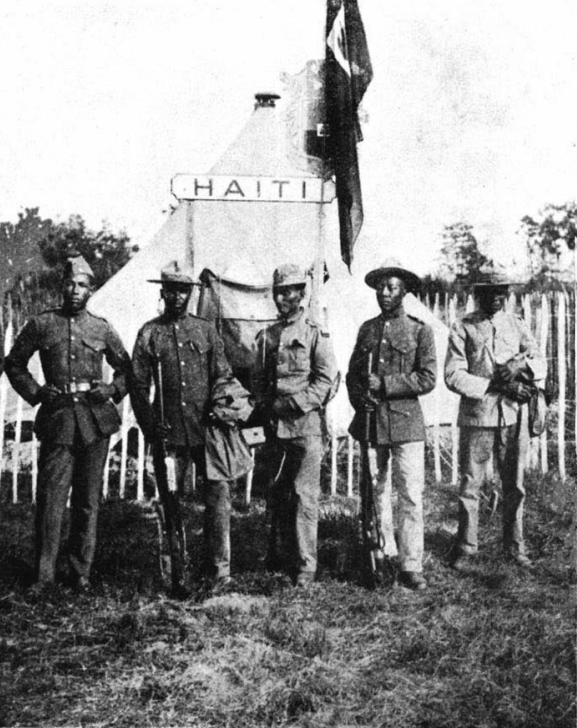
The Haitian rifle team that won their nation's first medal of any color, a bronze in the men's team free rifle event

The medal table is based on information provided by the International Olympic Committee (IOC) and is consistent with IOC convention in its published medal tables. By default, the table is ordered by the number of gold medals the athletes from a nation won, where a nation is an entity represented by a National Olympic Committee (NOC). The number of silver medals is taken into consideration next and then the number of bronze medals.

In gymnastics, two silver medals (and no bronze) were awarded to Jean Gounot and François Gangloff for a second-place tie in the men's sidehorse vault event, while two bronze medals were awarded to Ladislav Vácha and August Güttinger for a third-place tie in the men's rope climbing event. In rowing, no bronze medal was awarded in the men's coxless pair event, as there were only two teams that participated in the final after Gordon Killick and Thomas Southgate of Great Britain got injured and did not start.

* Host nation (France)

1924 Summer Olympics medal table
Rank	Nation	Gold	Silver	Bronze	Total
1	United States	45	27	27	99
2	Finland	14	13	10	37
3	France*	13	15	10	38
4	Great Britain	9	13	12	34
5	Italy	8	3	5	16
6	Switzerland	7	8	10	25
7	Norway	5	2	3	10
8	Sweden	4	13	12	29
9	Netherlands	4	1	5	10
10	Belgium	3	7	3	13
11	Australia	3	1	2	6
12	Denmark	2	5	2	9
13	Hungary	2	3	4	9
14	Yugoslavia	2	0	0	2
15	Czechoslovakia	1	4	5	10
16	Argentina	1	3	2	6
17	Estonia	1	1	4	6
18	South Africa	1	1	1	3
19	Uruguay	1	0	0	1
20	Austria	0	3	1	4
20	Canada	0	3	1	4
22	Poland	0	1	1	2
23	Haiti	0	0	1	1
23	Japan	0	0	1	1
23	New Zealand	0	0	1	1
23	Portugal	0	0	1	1
23	Romania	0	0	1	1
Totals (27 entries)		126	127	125	378

== Art competitions ==
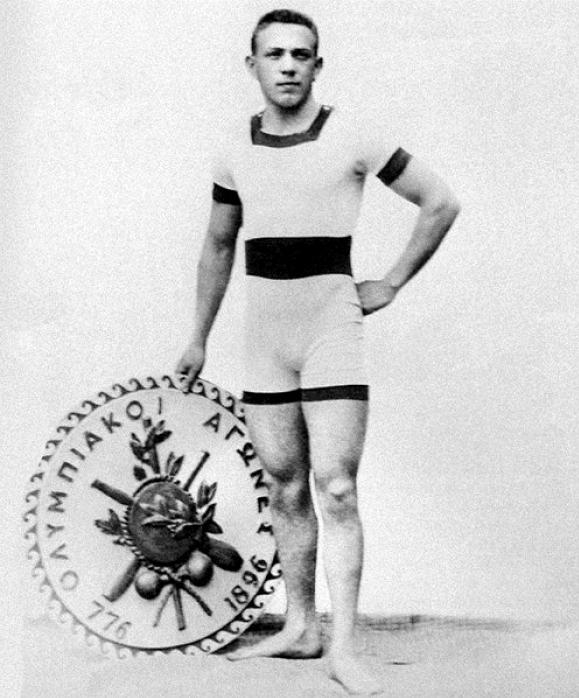
Alfréd Hajós at the 1896 Summer Olympics, where he became the first Olympic champion in swimming before winning the silver medal at these Games

The 1924 Summer Olympics also included art competitions across five disciplines: architecture, literature, music, painting, and sculpture, for works inspired by sport-related themes, were medal-eligible events at the time. Art competitions were held from the 1912 Summer Olympics until the 1948 Summer Olympics, but were discontinued over the amateurism controversy. Medals in art competitions are no longer recognized by the IOC as part of the total medal count.

In architecture, no gold medal was awarded while the silver was awarded to the pair of Alfréd Hajós and Dezső Lauber of Hungary. Hajós became one of only two Olympians ever to have won medals in both sport (two golds in swimming at the 1896 Summer Olympics) and art Olympic competitions. The bronze was awarded to Julien Médecin of Monaco, who became the first Monégasque competitor to win an Olympic medal. (Note: No longer recognized by the IOC as part of the total medal count)

In literature, one gold, which was awarded to Géo-Charles of France, two silvers to Josef Petersen of Denmark and Margaret Stuart of Great Britain, and two bronzes to Charles Gonnet of France and Oliver Gogarty of Ireland, were awarded. Two compositions, entitled "The Land Where the Rose is Grown" and "O Vigila (now let the games begin)", that were part of the literature competition, were also part of the music competitions. The compositions were made by George Bamber of Great Britain, though no medals were awarded in the music competition as the jury could not reach a consensus to award medals for any of the competitors.

In painting, Jean Jacoby of Luxembourg won the gold medal, becoming the first Luxembourgish competitor to win an Olympic gold medal, (Note: This event is no longer recognized by the IOC as part of the total medal count. Luxembourgish-born Michel Théato won the men's marathon at the 1900 Summer Olympics, but is credited as a French competitor without having applied for French citizenship. Josy Barthel won the nation's first official gold medal, winning the men's 1500 metres event at the 1952 Summer Olympics.) Jack Butler Yeats of Ireland won the silver, becoming the first Irish competitor to win an Olympic medal, and Johan van Hell of the Netherlands won the bronze.

In sculpture, Konstantinos Dimitriadis of Greece won the gold medal, Frantz Heldenstein of Luxembourg won the silver, and two bronze medals were awarded, one to Jean René Gauguin of Denmark and the other to Claude-Léon Mascaux of France.
