= Yugoslavia at the 1924 Summer Olympics =

- Flag of the Kingdom of Serbs, Croats and Slovenes
- IOC code: YUG
- NOC: Yugoslav Olympic Committee

in Paris
- Competitors: 42 in 8 sports
- Flag bearer: Stanko Perpar
- Medals Ranked 14th: Gold 2 Silver 0 Bronze 0 Total 2

Summer Olympics appearances (overview)
- 1920; 1924; 1928; 1932; 1936; 1948; 1952; 1956; 1960; 1964; 1968; 1972; 1976; 1980; 1984; 1988; 1992; 1996; 2000

Other related appearances
- Serbia (1912, 2008–pres.); Croatia (1992–pres.); Slovenia (1992–pres.); Bosnia and Herzegovina (1992 S–pres.); Independent Olympic Participants (1992 S); North Macedonia (1996–pres.); Serbia and Montenegro (1996–2006); Montenegro (2008–pres.); Kosovo (2016–pres.)

Athletes from the Kingdom of Serbs, Croats and Slovenes competed at the 1924 Summer Olympics in Paris, France. For the first time in history the country won medals.

== Medalists ==
Medal	Name	Sport	Event
Gold	Leon Štukelj	Gymnastics	Men's All-Around Competition
Gold	Leon Štukelj	Gymnastics	Men's Horizontal Bar

== Athletics ==
Five athletes represented Yugoslavia in 1924. It was the nation's debut appearance in the sport.

Ranks given are within the heat.

Athlete	Event	Heats		Quarterfinals		Semifinals		Final	
Athlete	Event	Result	Rank	Result	Rank	Result	Rank	Result	Rank
Peroslav Ferković	Decathlon	N/A						5517.925	18
Đuro Gašpar	Decathlon	N/A						did not finish	
Veljko Narančić	Shot put	N/A				13.215	6	did not advance	
Veljko Narančić	Discus throw	N/A				37.35	8	did not advance	
Stanko Perpar	200 m	Unknown	3	did not advance					
Aleksa Spahić	Pentathlon	N/A						Elim-3	

== Cycling ==
Four cyclists represented Yugoslavia in 1924. It was the nation's debut in the sport.

=== Road cycling ===
Men

Cyclist	Event	Final	
Cyclist	Event	Result	Rank
Ðuro Ðukanović	Time trial	7:17:23.6	35
Ivan Kosmatin	Time trial	7:18:24.0	37
Koloman Sović	Time trial	7:21:35.0	41
Milan Truban	Time trial	7:53:40.0	50
Ðuro Dukanović; Ivan Kosmatin; Koloman Sović; Milan Truban	Team time trial	21:57:22.6	10

== Equestrian ==
A single equestrian represented Yugoslavia in 1924. It was the nation's debut in the sport. Seunig finished last in the dressage event.

Equestrian	Event	Final	
Equestrian	Event	Score	Rank
Vladimir Seunig	Dressage	167.6	24

== Football ==
Yugoslavia competed in the Olympic football tournament for the second time in 1924.

Team Roster

- Dragutin Vrđuka
- Stjepan Vrbančić
- Eugen Dasović
- Marijan Marjanović
- Rudolf Rupec
- Janko Rodin
- Dragutin Babić
- Dušan Petković
- Emil Perška
- Vladimir Vinek
- Emil Plazzeriano

Round 1

May 26, 1924

Uruguay	7–0	Yugoslavia
Vidal 20'; Scarone 23'; Cea 50' 80'; Petrone 35' 61'; Romano 58'	Report

Stade Olympique, Colombes
Attendance: 1,000
Referee: Georges Vallat (FRA)

Final rank
17th

== Gymnastics ==
Eight gymnasts represented Yugoslavia in 1924. It was the nation's debut in the sport. Leon Štukelj took the gold medal in the horizontal bar to become Yugoslavia's first Olympic medalist (and first champion) in any sport; he would go on to finish first overall and take the all-around gold medal.

=== Artistic ===
Gymnast	Event	Final	
Gymnast	Event	Score	Rank
Stane Derganc	All-around	95.293	30
Stane Derganc	Horizontal bar	12.100	58
Stane Derganc	Parallel bars	18.92	40
Stane Derganc	Pommel horse	19.930	6
Stane Derganc	Rings	18.493	27
Stane Derganc	Rope climbing	8 (9.4 s)	24
Stane Derganc	Sidehorse vault	9.85	5
Stane Derganc	Vault	8.00	26
Stane Hlastan	All-around	81.249	44
Stane Hlastan	Horizontal bar	15.066	38
Stane Hlastan	Parallel bars	19.05	36
Stane Hlastan	Pommel horse	16.330	36
Stane Hlastan	Rings	17.543	48
Stane Hlastan	Rope climbing	0 (13.4 s)	66
Stane Hlastan	Sidehorse vault	9.86	4
Stane Hlastan	Vault	3.40	62
Mihael Oswald	All-around	91.066	36
Mihael Oswald	Horizontal bar	14.280	42
Mihael Oswald	Parallel bars	16.85	57
Mihael Oswald	Pommel horse	16.130	37
Mihael Oswald	Rings	19.160	23
Mihael Oswald	Rope climbing	8 (9.4 s)	24
Mihael Oswald	Sidehorse vault	8.93	38
Mihael Oswald	Vault	7.716	28
Rastko Poljšak	All-around	77.665	45
Rastko Poljšak	Horizontal bar	13.536	47
Rastko Poljšak	Parallel bars	18.00	51
Rastko Poljšak	Pommel horse	15.220	42
Rastko Poljšak	Rings	15.333	50
Rastko Poljšak	Rope climbing	4 (10.4 s)	45
Rastko Poljšak	Sidehorse vault	7.96	58
Rastko Poljšak	Vault	3.616	61
Janez Porenta	All-around	100.172	20
Janez Porenta	Horizontal bar	14.166	44
Janez Porenta	Parallel bars	18.90	41
Janez Porenta	Pommel horse	18.270	18
Janez Porenta	Rings	19.560	21
Janez Porenta	Rope climbing	10 (8.4 s)	6
Janez Porenta	Sidehorse vault	9.516	19
Janez Porenta	Vault	9.76	6
Josip Primožič	All-around	77.393	47
Josip Primožič	Horizontal bar	13.460	48
Josip Primožič	Parallel bars	19.42	34
Josip Primožič	Pommel horse	12.630	51
Josip Primožič	Rings	14.583	55
Josip Primožič	Rope climbing	3 (10.8 s)	47
Josip Primožič	Sidehorse vault	8.55	45
Josip Primožič	Vault	5.75	49
Leon Štukelj	All-around	110.340	1st place, gold medalist(s)
Leon Štukelj	Horizontal bar	19.730	1st place, gold medalist(s)
Leon Štukelj	Parallel bars	20.40	20
Leon Štukelj	Pommel horse	19.370	10
Leon Štukelj	Rings	21.330	4
Leon Štukelj	Rope climbing	10 (8.6 s)	10
Leon Štukelj	Sidehorse vault	9.60	17
Leon Štukelj	Vault	9.91	4
Stane Žilič	All-around	95.523	29
Stane Žilič	Horizontal bar	16.330	28
Stane Žilič	Parallel bars	19.00	37
Stane Žilič	Pommel horse	15.740	38
Stane Žilič	Rings	18.233	28
Stane Žilič	Rope climbing	10 (8.0 s)	5
Stane Žilič	Sidehorse vault	9.06	34
Stane Žilič	Vault	7.16	39
Leon Štukelj; Janez Porenta; Stane Žilič; Stane Derganc; Mihael Oswald; Stane Hlastan; Rastko Poljšak; Josip Primožič	Team	762.101	4

== Swimming ==
Ranks given are within the heat.

Men

Swimmer	Event	Heats		Semifinals		Final	
Swimmer	Event	Result	Rank	Result	Rank	Result	Rank
Ivo Pavelić	400 m freestyle	3:28.4	6	did not advance			
Ante Roje	1500 m freestyle	DNF	—	did not advance			
Đura Sentđerđi	400 m freestyle	6:41.4	4	did not advance			
Vlado Smokvina	100 m freestyle	1:11.6	5	did not advance			
Atilije Venturini	400 m freestyle	6:28.0	3	did not advance			
Ivo Arčanin; Ante Roje; Vlado Smokvina; Atilije Venturini	4×200 m freestyle relay	12:02.4	3	did not advance			

== Tennis ==
Men

Athlete	Event	Round of 128	Round of 64	Round of 32	Round of 16	Quarterfinals	Semifinals	Final	
Athlete	Event	Opposition Score	Opposition Score	Opposition Score	Opposition Score	Opposition Score	Opposition Score	Opposition Score	Rank
Đorđe Dunđerski	Singles	Gilbert (GBR); L 6–8, 1–6, 6–2, 2–6	did not advance						

== Wrestling ==
=== Greco-Roman ===
Men's

Athlete	Event	First round	Second round	Third round	Fourth round	Fifth round	Sixth round	Seventh round	Eighth round	Rank
Athlete	Event	Opposition Result	Opposition Result	Opposition Result	Opposition Result	Opposition Result	Opposition Result	Opposition Result	Opposition Result	Rank
Nikola Grbić	Middleweight	Nilsson (SWE); W	Veuve (SUI); W	Vilciņš (LAT); W	Lindfors (FIN); L	Okulicz-Kozaryn (POL); W	Westerlund (FIN); L	Did not advance	—N/a	=5
Stevan Nađ	Light heavyweight	Pellinen (FIN); L	Misset (NED); L	did not advance					—N/a	=12
