= Luxembourg at the 1924 Summer Olympics =

- IOC code: LUX
- NOC: Luxembourg Olympic and Sporting Committee

in Paris
- Flag bearer: Paul Hammer
- Medals: Gold 0 Silver 0 Bronze 0 Total 0

Summer Olympics appearances (overview)
- 1900; 1904–1908; 1912; 1920; 1924; 1928; 1932; 1936; 1948; 1952; 1956; 1960; 1964; 1968; 1972; 1976; 1980; 1984; 1988; 1992; 1996; 2000; 2004; 2008; 2012; 2016; 2020; 2024

Luxembourg competed at the 1924 Summer Olympics in Paris, France.

== Aquatics ==
=== Swimming ===
Ranks given are within the heat.

Men

Swimmer	Event	Heats		Semifinals		Final	
Swimmer	Event	Result	Rank	Result	Rank	Result	Rank
Jean-Pierre Moris	100 m backstroke	1:41.2	3	did not advance			
Eugène Kuborn	100 m backstroke	1:29.0	4	did not advance			

Women

Swimmer	Event	Heats		Semifinals		Final	
Swimmer	Event	Result	Rank	Result	Rank	Result	Rank
Renée Brasseur	100 m backstroke	—N/a		1:51.4	5	did not advance	
Laury Koster	200 m breaststroke	—N/a		3:35.0	2 Q	3:39.2	6

== Athletics ==
Three athletes represented Luxembourg in 1924. It was the nation's third appearance in the sport as well as the Games.

Ranks given are within the heat.

Athlete	Event	Heats		Quarterfinals		Semifinals		Final	
Athlete	Event	Result	Rank	Result	Rank	Result	Rank	Result	Rank
Paul Hammer	100 m	Unknown	2 Q	11.1	4	did not advance			
Paul Hammer	200 m	Unknown	3	did not advance					
Paul Hammer	400 m	53.1	3	did not advance					
Paul Hammer	Long jump	N/A				6.24	5	did not advance	
Joseph Hilger	100 m	Unknown	3	did not advance					
Joseph Hilger	200 m	Unknown	3	did not advance					
Joseph Hilger	Long jump	N/A				5.68	7	did not advance	
Christophe Mirgain	400 m	Unknown	5	did not advance					
Christophe Mirgain	800 m	N/A		Unknown	7	did not advance			

== Boxing ==
Six boxers represented Luxembourg at the 1924 Games. It was the nation's debut in the sport. The team went a combined 0 for 6.

Boxer	Weight class	Round of 32	Round of 16	Quarterfinals	Semifinals	Final / Bronze match	
Boxer	Weight class	Opposition Score	Opposition Score	Opposition Score	Opposition Score	Opposition Score	Rank
Pierre Feidt	Welterweight	Black (CAN); L	did not advance				17
Jean Flammang	Featherweight	Beavis (GBR); L	did not advance				17
Grégoire Laurent	Lightweight	Petersen (DEN); L	did not advance				17
Michel Maurer	Light heavyweight	Bye	Courtis (GBR); L	did not advance			9
Jules Steichen	Welterweight	Givel (SUI); L	did not advance				17
Jean Welter	Light heavyweight	Bye	Kirby (USA); L	did not advance			9

Opponent nation	Wins	Losses	Percent
Canada	0	1	.000
Denmark	0	1	.000
Great Britain	0	2	.000
Switzerland	0	1	.000
United States	0	1	.000
Total	0	6	.000

Round	Wins	Losses	Percent
Round of 32	0	4	.000
Round of 16	0	2	.000
Quarterfinals	0	0	–
Semifinals	0	0	–
Final	0	0	–
Bronze match	0	0	–
Total	0	6	.000

== Cycling ==
Five cyclists represented Luxembourg in 1924. It was the nation's second appearance in the sport.

=== Road cycling ===
Cyclist	Event	Final	
Cyclist	Event	Result	Rank
Jean-Pierre Kuhn	Time trial	7:22:12.4	42
Louis Pesch	Time trial	7:19:51.4	39
Nic Rausch	Time trial	7:04:46.0	27
Georges Schiltz	Time trial	7:00:34.4	25
Jean-Pierre Kuhn; Louis Pesch; Nic Rausch; Georges Schiltz	Team time trial	21:25:11.8	8

=== Track cycling ===
Ranks given are within the heat.

Cyclist	Event	First round		First repechage		Quarterfinals		Second repechage		Semifinals		Final	
Cyclist	Event	Result	Rank	Result	Rank	Result	Rank	Result	Rank	Result	Rank	Result	Rank
Maurice Gillen	Sprint	did not finish		did not advance									

== Football ==
Luxembourg competed in the Olympic football tournament for the second time in 1924.

Round 1
Bye

Round 2

May 29, 1924

Italy	2–0	Luxembourg
Baloncieri 20'; Della Valle 38'	Report

Stade Pershing
Attendance: 2,000
Referee: Jean Richard (FRA)

Final rank
9th place

== Gymnastics ==
Eight gymnasts represented Luxembourg in 1924. It was the nation's second appearance in the sport.

=== Artistic ===
Gymnast	Event	Final	
Gymnast	Event	Score	Rank
Mathias Erang	All-around	65.356	60
Mathias Erang	Horizontal bar	9.833	67
Mathias Erang	Parallel bars	15.90	62
Mathias Erang	Pommel horse	8.390	63
Mathias Erang	Rings	17.583	35
Mathias Erang	Rope climbing	0 (15.0 s)	69
Mathias Erang	Sidehorse vault	9.80	8
Mathias Erang	Vault	3.85	60
Théo Jeitz	All-around	65.980	57
Théo Jeitz	Horizontal bar	12.850	52
Théo Jeitz	Parallel bars	17.30	52
Théo Jeitz	Pommel horse	5.400	70
Théo Jeitz	Rings	15.750	46
Théo Jeitz	Rope climbing	0 (15.0 s)	69
Théo Jeitz	Sidehorse vault	8.83	40
Théo Jeitz	Vault	5.85	48
Émile Munhofen	All-around	65.556	58
Émile Munhofen	Horizontal bar	10.366	65
Émile Munhofen	Parallel bars	17.03	54
Émile Munhofen	Pommel horse	6.600	67
Émile Munhofen	Rings	15.100	52
Émile Munhofen	Rope climbing	0 (14.6 s)	68
Émile Munhofen	Sidehorse vault	8.68	43
Émile Munhofen	Vault	7.78	27
Albert Neumann	All-around	65.196	62
Albert Neumann	Horizontal bar	11.243	62
Albert Neumann	Parallel bars	18.28	47
Albert Neumann	Pommel horse	7.000	66
Albert Neumann	Rings	14.663	54
Albert Neumann	Rope climbing	0 (12.8 s)	65
Albert Neumann	Sidehorse vault	8.33	50
Albert Neumann	Vault	5.68	50
Jacques Palzer	All-around	61.563	67
Jacques Palzer	Horizontal bar	9.463	70
Jacques Palzer	Parallel bars	13.80	68
Jacques Palzer	Pommel horse	7.400	64
Jacques Palzer	Rings	14.910	53
Jacques Palzer	Rope climbing	0 (14.2 s)	67
Jacques Palzer	Sidehorse vault	8.33	50
Jacques Palzer	Vault	7.66	29
Charles Quaino	All-around	73.569	50
Charles Quaino	Horizontal bar	11.646	60
Charles Quaino	Parallel bars	18.50	45
Charles Quaino	Pommel horse	10.560	55
Charles Quaino	Rings	17.663	34
Charles Quaino	Rope climbing	0 (12.0 s)	60
Charles Quaino	Sidehorse vault	9.62	16
Charles Quaino	Vault	5.58	52
Pierre Tolar	All-around	58.713	68
Pierre Tolar	Horizontal bar	7.800	72
Pierre Tolar	Parallel bars	14.65	67
Pierre Tolar	Pommel horse	5.900	69
Pierre Tolar	Rings	17.183	42
Pierre Tolar	Rope climbing	3 (10.8 s)	47
Pierre Tolar	Sidehorse vault	8.08	56
Pierre Tolar	Vault	2.00	65
Mathias Weishaupt	All-around	58.596	69
Mathias Weishaupt	Horizontal bar	8.550	71
Mathias Weishaupt	Parallel bars	16.70	59
Mathias Weishaupt	Pommel horse	6.520	68
Mathias Weishaupt	Rings	17.496	39
Mathias Weishaupt	Rope climbing	2 (11.4 s)	51
Mathias Weishaupt	Sidehorse vault	7.33	67
Mathias Weishaupt	Vault	0.00	67
Charles Quaino; Théo Jeitz; Émile Munhofen; Mathias Erang; Albert Neumann; Jacques Palzer; Pierre Tolar; Mathias Weishaupt	Team	548.129	8

== Tennis ==
Men

Athlete	Event	Round of 128	Round of 64	Round of 32	Round of 16	Quarterfinals	Semifinals	Final	
Athlete	Event	Opposition Score	Opposition Score	Opposition Score	Opposition Score	Opposition Score	Opposition Score	Opposition Score	Rank
Camille Wolff	Singles	de Morpurgo (ITA); L 1–6, 0–6, 0–6	did not advance						

== Weightlifting ==
Athlete	Event	1H Snatch	1H Clean & Jerk	Press	Snatch	Clean & Jerk	Total	Rank
Joseph Alzin	Men's +82.5 kg						DNF	—
Johny Grün	Men's -67.5 kg	52.5	67.5	67.5	70	92.5	350	18
Henri Lehnen	Men's -82.5 kg	60	65	X	—	—	DNF	—
Michel Mertens	Men's -75 kg	60	70	80	75	95	380	19

== Wrestling ==
=== Greco-Roman ===
Men's

Athlete	Event	First round	Second round	Third round	Fourth round	Fifth round	Sixth round	Seventh round	Eighth round	Rank
Athlete	Event	Opposition Result	Opposition Result	Opposition Result	Opposition Result	Opposition Result	Opposition Result	Opposition Result	Opposition Result	Rank
Adolphe Dumont	Middleweight	Lindfors (FIN); L	Vidal (ESP); L	did not advance					—N/a	=20
Hilair Fettes	Featherweight	Řezáč (TCH); L	Rottiers (BEL); L	did not advance						=18
