= Kerttula =

Kerttula is a surname. Notable people with the surname include:

- Beth Kerttula (born 1956), American politician
- Eevert Kerttula (1894–1962), Finnish gymnast
- Erkki Kerttula (1909–1989), Finnish fencer
- Jay Kerttula (1928–2020), American businessman and politician
