= Pražák =

Pražák (feminine: Pražáková) is a Czech surname. The word colloquially means 'Praguer'. Notable people with this surname are:

- Albert Pražák (1880–1956), Czech literature historian
- Robert Pražák (1892–1966), Czech gymnast
