= Bohumil Mořkovský =

Gymnast

Personal information
- Born: 14 December 1899 Valašské Meziříčí, Austria-Hungary
- Died: 16 July 1928 (aged 28) Valašské Meziříčí, Czechoslovakia

Gymnastics career
- Discipline: Men's artistic gymnastics
- Country represented: Czechoslovakia
Medal record
Men's gymnastics
Representing Czechoslovakia
Olympic Games
Bronze medal – third place	1924 Paris	Vault

Bohumil Mořkovský (14 December 1899 – 16 July 1928) was a Czech gymnast who competed for Czechoslovakia in the 1924 Summer Olympics. He was born and died in Valašské Meziříčí, Moravia. He died less than a month before he could have made a repeat Olympic appearance.

== Gymnastics career ==
In 1924, he won a bronze medal in the vault competition. At the 1924 Summer Olympics he also participated in the following events:

- Rings - sixth place
- Individual all-around - 13th place
- Parallel bars - 13th place
- Rope climbing - 18th place
- Sidehorse vault - 23rd place
- Pommel horse - 31st place
- Horizontal bar - 41st place
- Team all-around - did not finish

== Legacy ==
In 2019, the Czech Postal System issued a postcard commemorating Mořkovský. The commemoration raised interest because a likeness of two-time Olympic Gymnastics Rings Champion, from Armenia, Albert Azaryan was erroneously used to depict Mořkovský.
