= Francesco Martino (gymnast) =

Italian artistic gymnast

- Born: 14 July 1900 Bari, Kingdom of Italy
- Died: 10 October 1965 (aged 65) Bari, Italy

Gymnastics career
- Discipline: Men's artistic gymnastics
- Country represented: Italy
Medal record
Men's artistic gymnastics
Representing Kingdom of Italy
Olympic Games
Gold medal – first place	1924 Paris	Team
Gold medal – first place	1924 Paris	Rings

Francesco Martino (14 July 1900 – 10 October 1965) was an Italian gymnast and Olympic champion. He was born and died in Bari.

Martino competed in the 1924 Summer Olympics in Paris where he received gold medals in rings and in team combined exercises.

At the 1924 Games, he also participated in the following events:

- horizontal bar - eleventh place
- rope climbing - 13th place
- parallel bars - 15th place
- individual trap - 16th place
- pommel horse - 28th place
- sidehorse vault - 44th place
- vault - 57th place
