= Robert Pražák =

Czech gymnast (1892–1966)

- Robert Pražák c. 1924

Personal information
- Born: 2 December 1892 Plzeň, Austria-Hungary
- Died: 16 May 1966 (aged 73) Plzeň, Czechoslovakia

Gymnastics career
- Discipline: Men's artistic gymnastics
- Country represented: Czechoslovakia
Medal record
Representing Czechoslovakia
Men's Gymnastic
Olympic Games
Silver medal – second place	1924 Paris	Ind. all-around
Silver medal – second place	1924 Paris	Parallel bars
Silver medal – second place	1924 Paris	Rings
Representing Bohemia
World Championships
Gold medal – first place	1913 Paris	Team

Robert Pražák (2 December 1892 – 16 May 1966) was a Czech gymnast. He competed for Czechoslovakia at the 1920 Summer Olympics and the 1924 Summer Olympics, winning three silver medals. He was also a member of the Gold-medal-winning Bohemian team at the 1913 World Championships.

== Early life ==
Pražák was born in Plzeň. He was a pupil of František Erben.

== Gymnastics career ==
In 1920, he was a member of the Czechoslovak gymnastic team, which finished fourth in the team event. Four years later, he won three silver medals in the individual all-around event, in the parallel bars competition, and in the rings event. At the 1924 Summer Olympics he also participated in the following events:

- Sidehorse vault - eighth place
- Vault - ninth place
- Horizontal bar - ninth place
- Pommel horse - 13th place
- Rope climbing - 13th place
- Team all-around - did not finish
