= Gymnastics at the 1924 Summer Olympics =

Gymnastics at the Games of the VIII Olympiad
- Venue: Stade de Colombes
- Dates: 17–24 July 1924

At the 1924 Summer Olympics in Paris, nine events in gymnastics were contested, all for men only. The competitions were held from 17 July 1924 to 24 July 1924.

== Medal summary ==
Games	Gold	Silver	Bronze
Individual all-around	Leon Štukelj; Yugoslavia	Robert Pražák; Czechoslovakia	Bedřich Šupčík; Czechoslovakia
Team all-around	Italy; Luigi Cambiaso; Mario Lertora; Vittorio Lucchetti; Luigi Maiocco; Ferdinando Mandrini; Francesco Martino; Giuseppe Paris; Giorgio Zampori	France; Eugène Cordonnier; Léon Delsarte; François Gangloff; Jean Gounot; Arthur Hermann; André Higelin; Joseph Huber; Albert Séguin	Switzerland; Hans Grieder; August Güttinger; Jean Gutweninger; Georges Miez; Otto Pfister; Antoine Rebetez; Carl Widmer; Josef Wilhelm
Horizontal bar	Leon Štukelj; Yugoslavia	Jean Gutweninger; Switzerland	André Higelin; France
Parallel bars	August Güttinger; Switzerland	Robert Pražák; Czechoslovakia	Giorgio Zampori; Italy
Pommel horse	Josef Wilhelm; Switzerland	Jean Gutweninger; Switzerland	Antoine Rebetez; Switzerland
Rings	Francesco Martino; Italy	Robert Pražák; Czechoslovakia	Ladislav Vácha; Czechoslovakia
Rope climbing	Bedřich Šupčík; Czechoslovakia	Albert Séguin; France	Ladislav Vácha; Czechoslovakia; August Güttinger; Switzerland
Sidehorse vault	Albert Séguin; France	Jean Gounot; France; François Gangloff; France	none awarded
Vault	Frank Kriz; United States	Jan Koutný; Czechoslovakia	Bohumil Mořkovský; Czechoslovakia

== Participating nations ==
A total of 72 gymnasts from nine nations competed at the Paris Games:

- Czechoslovakia (8)
- Finland (8)
- France (8)
- Great Britain (8)
- Italy (8)
- Luxembourg (8)
- Switzerland (8)
- United States (8)
- Yugoslavia (8)

== Medal table ==
Rank	Nation	Gold	Silver	Bronze	Total
1	Switzerland	2	2	3	7
2	Italy	2	0	1	3
3	Yugoslavia	2	0	0	2
4	Czechoslovakia	1	4	4	9
5	France	1	4	1	6
6	United States	1	0	0	1
Totals (6 entries)		9	10	9	28

== Sources ==
- "Olympic Medal Winners". International Olympic Committee.
