= Josef Kos =

Czech gymnast

- Kos at the 1924 Summer Olympics

Personal information
- Born: 18 July 1892 Hradec Králové, Austria-Hungary
- Died: 28 January 1961 (aged 68)

Gymnastics career
- Discipline: Men's artistic gymnastics
- Country represented: Czechoslovakia

Josef Kos (18 July 1892 – 28 January 1961) was a Czech gymnast. He competed in four events at the 1924 Summer Olympics.
