= Albert Séguin =

French gymnast

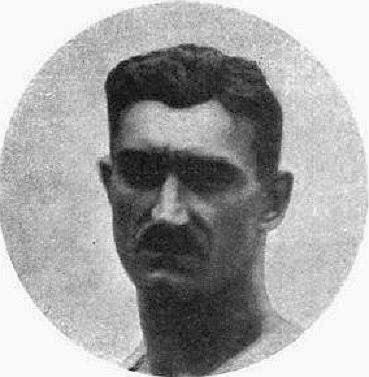
- Séguin in 1924

Personal information
- Born: 8 March 1891
- Died: 29 May 1948 (aged 57)

Gymnastics career
- Discipline: Men's artistic gymnastics
- Country represented: France
Medal record
Men's gymnastics
Representing France
Olympic Games
Gold medal – first place	1924 Paris	Sidehorse vault
Silver medal – second place	1924 Paris	Rope climbing
Silver medal – second place	1924 Paris	Team

Albert Séguin (8 March 1891 – 29 May 1948) was a French gymnast and Olympic champion. He competed at the 1924 Summer Olympics, where he received a gold medal in sidehorse vault, and silver medals in rope climbing and in team combined exercises.
