= Josef Wilhelm =

Swiss artistic gymnast

- Born: 1892
- Died: 1956 (aged 63–64)

Gymnastics career
- Discipline: Men's artistic gymnastics
- Country represented: Switzerland
- Gym: Chur
Medal record
Men's artistic gymnastics
Representing Switzerland
Olympic Games
Gold medal – first place	1924 Paris	Pommel horse
Bronze medal – third place	1924 Paris	Team

Josef Wilhelm (1892 – 1956) was a Swiss gymnast and Olympic Champion. He competed at the 1924 Summer Olympics, where he received a gold medal in pommel horse, and a bronze medal in team combined exercises.
