= Jean Gutweniger =

Swiss artistic gymnast (1892–1979)

- Born: 13 November 1892
- Died: 11 July 1979 (aged 86)

Gymnastics career
- Discipline: Men's artistic gymnastics
- Country represented: Switzerland
Medal record
Men's Gymnastic
| Silver medal – second place | 1924 Paris | Horizontal bar |
| Silver medal – second place | 1924 Paris | Pommel horse |
| Bronze medal – third place | 1924 Paris | Team |

Jean Gutweniger (13 November 1892 – 11 July 1979) was a Swiss gymnast and Olympic medalist. He competed at the 1924 Summer Olympics in Paris where he received silver medals in pommel horse and horizontal bar, and a bronze medal in team combined exercises.
