= Alphonse Higelin =

French gymnast

- Alternative name: Alphonse Hüglin
- Born: 26 April 1897 Mulhouse, France
- Died: 21 June 1981 (aged 84) Mulhouse, France

Gymnastics career
- Discipline: Men's artistic gymnastics
- Country represented: France
- Gym: Cercle Catholique Saint-Joseph
Medal record
Men's artistic gymnastics
Representing France
Olympic Games
Silver medal – second place	1924 Paris	Team
Bronze medal – third place	1920 Antwerp	Team
Bronze medal – third place	1924 Paris	Horizontal bar

Alphonse Higelin (26 April 1897 – 21 June 1981) was a French gymnast who competed in the 1920 Summer Olympics and in the 1924 Summer Olympics.
