= August Güttinger =

Swiss gymnast (1892–1970)

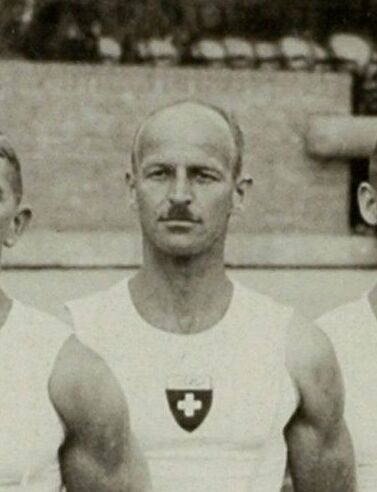
- Güttinger at the 1928 Summer Olympics

Personal information
- Born: 10 July 1892
- Died: November 1970 (aged 78) Winterthur, Switzerland

Gymnastics career
- Discipline: Men's artistic gymnastics
- Country represented: Switzerland
- Gym: Veltheim
Medal record
Men's artistic gymnastics
Representing Switzerland
Olympic Games
Gold medal – first place	1924 Paris	Parallel bars
Gold medal – first place	1928 Amsterdam	Team
Bronze medal – third place	1924 Paris	Team
Bronze medal – third place	1924 Paris	Rope climbing

August Güttinger (10 July 1892 – November 1970) was a Swiss gymnast and Olympic Champion. He competed at the 1924 Summer Olympics, where he received a gold medal in parallel bars, and bronze medals in rope climbing and team combined exercises. He received a gold medal in team combined exercises at the 1928 Summer Olympics in Amsterdam.
