= Harold Brown (gymnast) =

British gymnast (1904–1986)

- Born: 6 October 1904
- Died: November 1986 (aged 81–82)

Gymnastics career
- Discipline: Men's artistic gymnastics
- Country represented: (United Kingdom) Great Britain

Harold Brown (6 October 1904 – November 1986) was a British gymnast. He competed in nine events at the 1924 Summer Olympics.
