= Antoine Rebetez =

Swiss gymnast

- Born: 1897
- Died: 28 January 1980 (aged 82–83) Les Genevez, Switzerland

Gymnastics career
- Discipline: Men's artistic gymnastics
- Country represented: Switzerland
- Gym: La Chaux-de-Fonds
Medal record
Men's artistic gymnastics
Representing Switzerland
Olympic Games
Bronze medal – third place	1924 Paris	Team
Bronze medal – third place	1924 Paris	Pommel horse

Antoine Rebetez (1897 – 28 January 1980) was a Swiss gymnast who competed in the 1924 Summer Olympics.
