= Hans Grieder =

Swiss gymnast

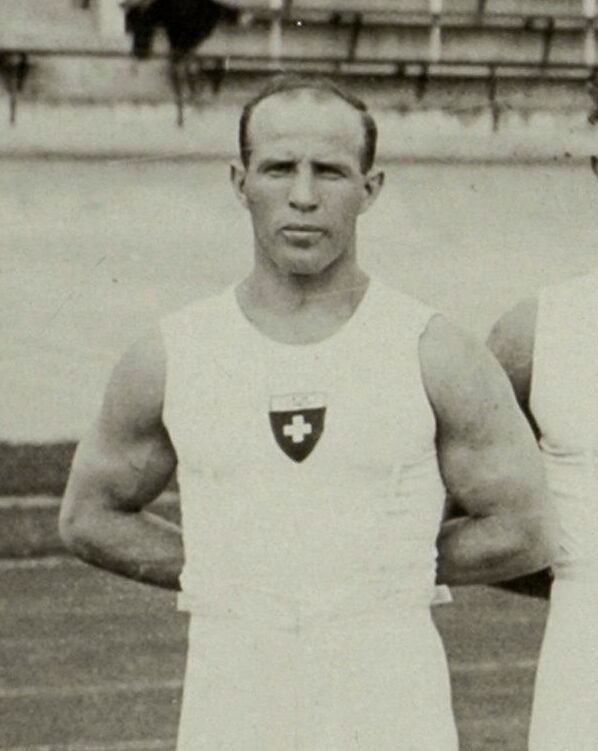
- Grieder at the 1928 Summer Olympics

Personal information
- Born: 12 November 1901
- Died: 31 October 1995 (aged 93)

Gymnastics career
- Discipline: Men's artistic gymnastics
- Country represented: Switzerland
- Gym: Arbon
Medal record
Men's artistic gymnastics
Representing Switzerland
Olympic Games
Gold medal – first place	1928 Amsterdam	Team
Bronze medal – third place	1924 Paris	Team
World Championships
Gold medal – first place	1934 Budapest	Team

Hans Grieder (12 November 1901 – 31 October 1995) was a Swiss gymnast who competed in the 1924 Summer Olympics and in the 1928 Summer Olympics.
