= Stane Žilič =

Slovenian gymnast (1897–1980)

- Стане Жилич
- Full name: Stanko Žilič
- Born: 1897 Ljubljana, Austria-Hungary
- Died: 15 October 1980 (aged 82–83)

Gymnastics career
- Discipline: Men's artistic gymnastics
- Country represented: Kingdom of Serbs, Croats and Slovenes

Stanko "Stane" Žilič (1897 – 15 October 1980) was a Slovenian gymnast. He competed in nine events at the 1924 Summer Olympics.
