= Mihael Oswald =

Slovenian gymnast (1892–1979)

- Born: 26 July 1892 Ljubljana, Austria-Hungary
- Died: 15 January 1979 (aged 86) Ljubljana, Yugoslavia

Gymnastics career
- Discipline: Men's artistic gymnastics
- Country represented: Yugoslavia

Mihael Oswald (26 July 1892 – 15 January 1979) was a Slovenian gymnast who competed for Yugoslavia. He competed in nine events at the 1924 Summer Olympics.
