= Slavko Hlastan =

Slovenian gymnast (1897–1980)

- Born: 28 December 1897 Trbovlje, Austria-Hungary
- Died: 15 December 1980 (aged 82) Trbovlje, Socialist Federal Republic of Yugoslavia

Gymnastics career
- Discipline: Men's artistic gymnastics
- Country represented: Kingdom of Serbs, Croats and Slovenes

Slavko Hlastan (28 December 1897 – 15 December 1980) was a Slovenian gymnast. He competed in nine events at the 1924 Summer Olympics.
