= Vittorio Lucchetti =

Italian artistic gymnast (1894–1965)

- Born: 21 December 1894 Livorno, Kingdom of Italy
- Died: 3 February 1965 (aged 70) Genoa, Italy

Gymnastics career
- Discipline: Men's artistic gymnastics
- Country represented: Italy
- Club: Società Ginnastica Ligure Cristoforo Colombo
Medal record
Men's artistic gymnastics
Representing Kingdom of Italy
Olympic Games
Gold medal – first place	1920 Antwerp	Team
Gold medal – first place	1924 Paris	Team

Vittorio Lucchetti (December 21, 1894 – February 3, 1965) was an Italian gymnast who competed at the Summer Olympics in 1920, 1924, and 1928.

Lucchetti was a member of the Italian team, which won the gold medal in the gymnastics men's team, European system event, in 1920, as well as in the team competition in 1924. In 1920, Lucchetti also competed in the individual all-around competition and finished 18th.

Lucchetti was born in Livorno and died in Genoa at the age of 71.
