= Carl Widmer =

Swiss artistic gymnast

- Born: 1900

Gymnastics career
- Discipline: Men's artistic gymnastics
- Country represented: Switzerland
- Gym: Schöftland
Medal record
Men's artistic gymnastics
Representing Switzerland
Olympic Games
Bronze medal – third place	1924 Paris	Team

Carl Widmer (born 1900, date of death unknown) was a Swiss gymnast who competed in the 1924 Summer Olympics.
