= Luigi Cambiaso =

Italian gymnast

- Born: 29 January 1895 Rivarolo Ligure, Kingdom of Italy
- Died: 25 March 1975 (aged 80) Genoa, Italy

Gymnastics career
- Discipline: Men's artistic gymnastics
- Country represented: Italy
- Club: Società Ginnastica Comunale Sampierdarenese
Medal record
Men's artistic gymnastics
Representing Kingdom of Italy
Olympic Games
Gold medal – first place	1920 Antwerp	Team
Gold medal – first place	1924 Paris	Team

Luigi Cambiaso (29 January 1895 – 25 March 1975) was an Italian gymnast who competed in the 1920 Summer Olympics and in the 1924 Summer Olympics. He was part of the Italian team, which won the gold medal in the gymnastics men's team, European system event in 1920 as well as in the team competition 1924.
