= Rastko Poljšak =

Slovenian gymnast (1899–1994)

- Растко Пољшак
- Full name: Rastko Rudolf Poljšak
- Born: 1 February 1899 Ljubljana, Austria-Hungary
- Died: 22 October 1994 (aged 95) Ljubljana, Slovenia

Gymnastics career
- Discipline: Men's artistic gymnastics
- Country represented: Kingdom of Serbs, Croats and Slovenes

Rastko Rudolf Poljšak (1 February 1899 – 22 October 1994) was a Slovenian gymnast. He competed in nine events at the 1924 Summer Olympics.
