= Charles Quaino =

Luxembourgish gymnast (1897–1977)

- Born: 2 May 1897 Niederkorn, Luxembourg
- Died: 28 November 1977 (aged 80) Niederkorn, Luxembourg

Gymnastics career
- Discipline: Men's artistic gymnastics
- Country represented: Luxembourg

Charles Quaino (2 May 1897 – 28 November 1977) was a Luxembourgish gymnast. He competed in nine events at the 1924 Summer Olympics.
