= Jacques Palzer =

Luxembourgish gymnast (1900–1979)

- Born: 21 April 1900 Esch-sur-Alzette, Luxembourg
- Died: 13 December 1979 (aged 79) Esch-sur-Alzette, Luxembourg

Gymnastics career
- Discipline: Men's artistic gymnastics
- Country represented: Luxembourg

Jacques Palzer (21 April 1900 – 13 December 1979) was a Luxembourgish gymnast. He competed in nine events at the 1924 Summer Olympics.
