= Giuseppe Paris =

Italian artistic gymnast

- Born: 22 September 1895 Milan, Kingdom of Italy
- Died: 5 April 1968 (aged 72) Capriate San Gervasio, Italy

Gymnastics career
- Discipline: Men's artistic gymnastics
- Country represented: Italy
Medal record
Men's artistic gymnastics
Representing Kingdom of Italy
Olympic Games
Gold medal – first place	1920 Antwerp	Team
Gold medal – first place	1924 Paris	Team

Giuseppe Paris (22 September 1895 – 5 April 1968) was an Italian gymnast who competed at the 1920 Summer Olympics, the 1924 Summer Olympics and the 1928 Summer Olympics. He was born in Milan. He was part of the Italian team, which was able to win the gold medal in the gymnastics men's team, European system event in 1920 as well as in the team competition 1924.
