= Léon Delsarte =

French gymnast (1893–1963)

- Born: 19 November 1893 Valenciennes, France
- Died: 24 January 1963 (aged 69) Valenciennes, France

Gymnastics career
- Discipline: Men's artistic gymnastics
- Country represented: France
- Gym: Ouvrière Valenciennoise
Medal record
Men's artistic gymnastics
Representing France
Olympic Games
Silver medal – second place	1924 Paris	Team
Bronze medal – third place	1920 Antwerp	Team

Léon Delsarte (19 November 1893 in Valenciennes – 24 January 1963 in Valenciennes) was a French gymnast who competed in the 1920 Summer Olympics and in the 1924 Summer Olympics.
