= Théo Jeitz =

Luxembourgish gymnast (1897–1976)

- Full name: Théodore Jeitz
- Born: 28 November 1897 Niederkorn, Luxembourg
- Died: August 1976 (aged 78) New York City, New York, US

Gymnastics career
- Discipline: Men's artistic gymnastics
- Country represented: Luxembourg

Théodore Jeitz (28 November 1897 – August 1976) was a Luxembourgish gymnast. He competed in nine events at the 1924 Summer Olympics.
