= Arthur Hermann =

French gymnast

- Full name: Arthur Alfred Hermann
- Born: 16 October 1893 Mulhouse, France
- Died: 28 March 1958 (aged 64) Belfort, France

Gymnastics career
- Discipline: Men's artistic gymnastics
- Country represented: France
- Gym: La Belfortaine
Medal record
Men's artistic gymnastics
Representing France
Olympic Games
Silver medal – second place	1924 Paris	Team
Bronze medal – third place	1920 Antwerp	Team

Arthur Alfred Hermann (16 October 1893 – 28 March 1958) was a French gymnast who competed in the 1920 Summer Olympics and in the 1924 Summer Olympics.

Hermann was born in Mulhouse, France, and died in Belfort.
