= Joseph Huber (gymnast) =

French gymnast

- Full name: François Joseph Huber
- Alternative name: Franz Joseph Hüber
- Born: 24 September 1893 Dornach, France
- Died: 18 January 1976 (aged 82) Pfastatt, France

Gymnastics career
- Discipline: Men's artistic gymnastics
- Country represented: France
Medal record
Men's artistic gymnastics
Representing France
Olympic Games
Silver medal – second place	1924 Paris	Team

François Joseph Huber (24 September 1893 – 18 January 1976) was a French gymnast who competed in the 1924 Summer Olympics.
