= Eevert Kerttula =

Finnish gymnast

- Full name: Eevert Erkki Kerttula
- Born: 3 July 1894 Pyhäjärvi, Grand Duchy of Finland, Russian Empire
- Died: 23 August 1962 (aged 68) Lahti, Finland

Gymnastics career
- Discipline: Men's artistic gymnastics
- Country represented: Finland

Eevert Erkki Kerttula (3 July 1894 – 23 August 1962) was a Finnish gymnast. He competed in nine events at the 1924 Summer Olympics.
