= François Gangloff =

French gymnast

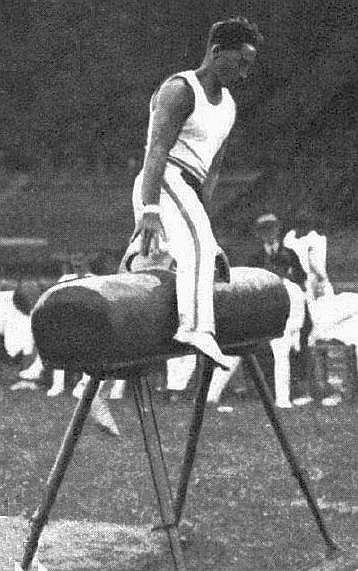

Personal information
- Born: 11 July 1898
- Died: 16 March 1979 (aged 80)

Gymnastics career
- Discipline: Men's artistic gymnastics
- Country represented: France
Medal record
Men's artistic gymnastics
Representing France
Olympic Games
Silver medal – second place	1924 Paris	Sidehorse vault
Silver medal – second place	1924 Paris	Team combined exercises

François Gangloff (11 July 1898 – 16 March 1979) was a French gymnast and Olympic medalist. He competed at the 1924 Summer Olympics in Paris, where he received a silver medal in sidehorse vault, and a silver medal and in team combined exercises.
