= Jean Gounot =

French gymnast

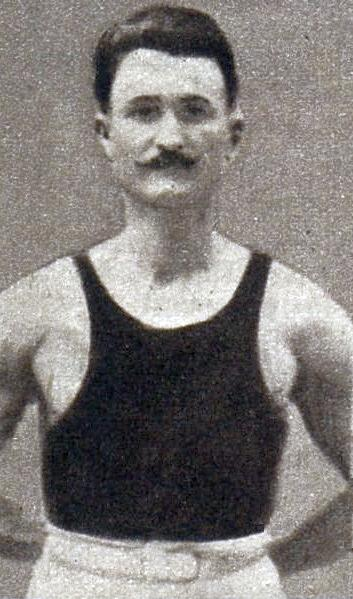
- Jean Gounot en 1928

Personal information
- Born: 9 April 1894
- Died: 16 January 1978 (aged 83)

Gymnastics career
- Discipline: Men's artistic gymnastics
- Country represented: France
Medal record
Olympic Games
Silver medal – second place	1924 Paris	Sidehorse vault
Silver medal – second place	1924 Paris	Team
Bronze medal – third place	1920 Antwerp	All-around, individual

Jean Gounot (French: [ʒɑ̃ ɡuno]; 9 April 1894 – 16 January 1978) was a French gymnast and Olympic medalist. He competed at the 1920 Summer Olympics in Antwerp, where he received a bronze medal in the individual all-around.

At the 1924 Summer Olympics in Paris he received a silver medal in sidehorse vault, and a silver medal and in team combined exercises.
