= Leon Štukelj =

Slovenian gymnast

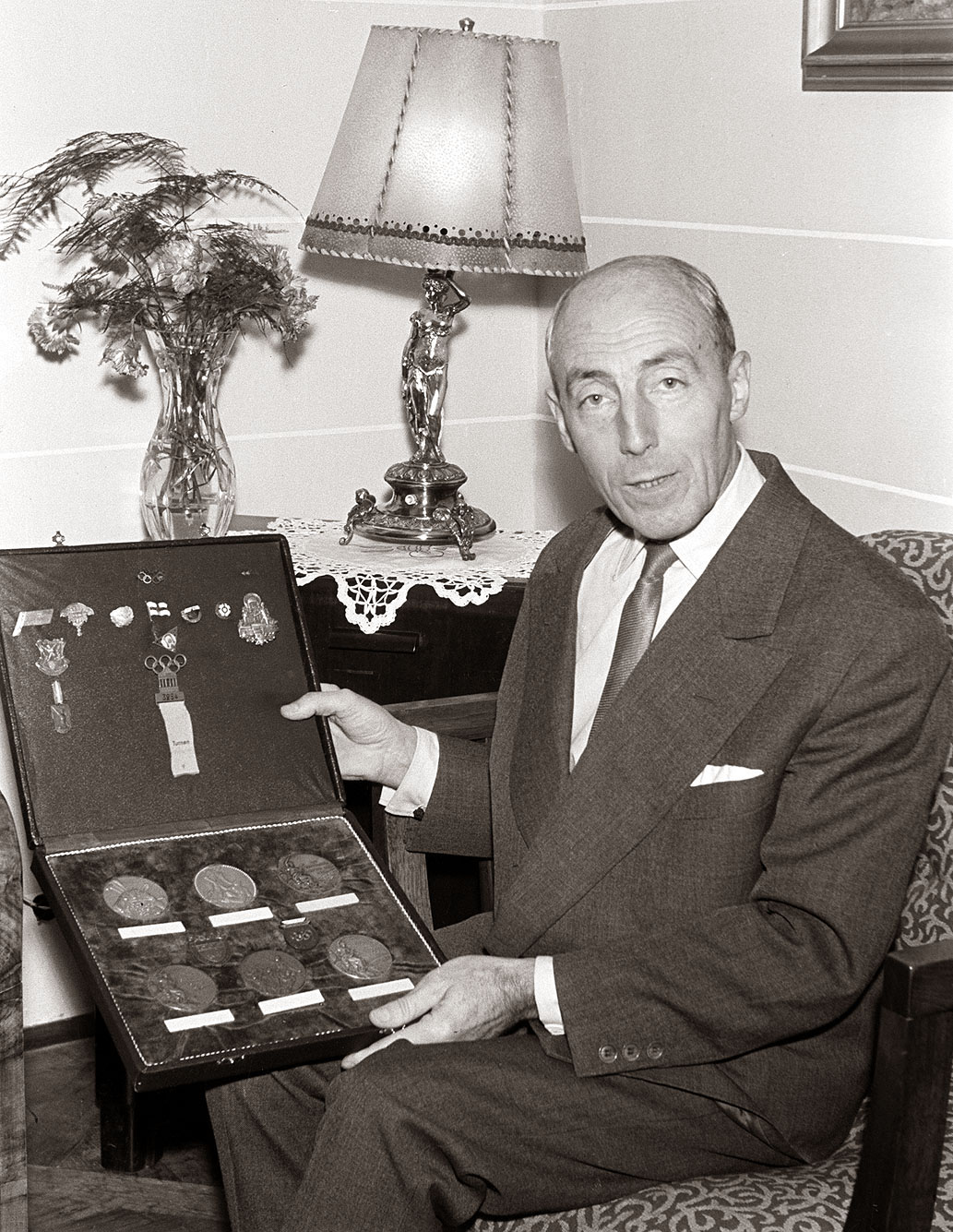
- Štukelj in 1958 displaying his six Olympic medals

Personal information
- Born: 12 November 1898 Kandija, Carniola, Austria-Hungary (now Slovenia)
- Died: 8 November 1999 (aged 100) Maribor, Slovenia

Gymnastics career
- Discipline: Men's artistic gymnastics
- Country represented: Yugoslavia
Medal record
Men's gymnastics
Representing (Kingdom of Yugoslavia) Yugoslavia
Olympic Games
Gold medal – first place	1924 Paris	All-around
Gold medal – first place	1924 Paris	Horizontal bar
Gold medal – first place	1928 Amsterdam	Rings
Bronze medal – third place	1928 Amsterdam	Team competition
Bronze medal – third place	1928 Amsterdam	All-around
Silver medal – second place	1936 Berlin	Rings
World Championships
Gold medal – first place	1922 Ljubljana	Parallel bars
Gold medal – first place	1922 Ljubljana	Horizontal bar
Gold medal – first place	1922 Ljubljana	Rings
Gold medal – first place	1926 Lyon	Horizontal bar
Gold medal – first place	1926 Lyon	Rings
Silver medal – second place	1922 Ljubljana	Pommel horse
Bronze medal – third place	1926 Lyon	Parallel bars
Bronze medal – third place	1930 Luxembourg	Horizontal bar

Leon Štukelj (12 November 1898 – 8 November 1999) was a Slovene professional gymnast. He was an Olympic gold medalist and athlete who represented Yugoslavia at the Olympics.

He is a noted figure in Slovenian sporting history. Štukelj is one of the first Slovene athletes to have risen to the very top of his sport, where he remained right from the World Championships in Ljubljana in 1922 all the way to the 1936 Olympic Games in Berlin, at which point he finished his competitive gymnastics career.

Štukelj competed at seven major international competitions and won a total of twenty medals: eight gold, six silver, and six bronze. At the Olympic Games alone he won six medals: two gold medals (counted for Yugoslavia) in Paris in 1924, one gold medal and two bronze in Amsterdam in 1928 and a silver medal in Berlin in 1936.

== Biography ==
Štukelj was born in Kandija (part of Novo Mesto since 1923), Austria-Hungary (now in Slovenia). His baptismal record bears the name Leopold, crossed out and replaced with Leo. A 1999 addendum to the volume corrects the name Leo to Leon; his name appears as both Leo Štukelj and Leon Štukelj in newspapers of the 1920s and 1930s.

In 1927, Štukelj graduated with a degree in law. Since his youth, he was an active member of the Slovenian Sokol athletic movement. After finishing his sports career, he became a judge, first in his hometown of Novo Mesto. Later, he moved to Lenart, and then to Maribor, where he lived until his death. After World War II, Štukelj was not a supporter of the newly formed Communist regime of Yugoslavia. He took part in the Yugoslav royalist (Chetnik) movement, hostile to Tito's partisans, and maintained contacts with the British Special Operations Executive. For these reasons, he was suspicious to the new Communist regime. After the war, he was first imprisoned, then released; but permanently barred from being a judge. He worked as a legal assistant for the rest of his career.

Štukelj was presented at the opening ceremony of the Games of the XXVI Olympiad in Atlanta in 1996 as the oldest living Olympic gold medalist at the time, where he shook hands with Bill Clinton, the President of the United States at the time. He also presented the medals to winners in the men's team competition.

Štukelj died aged 100, in 1999.

A sports hall in Novo Mesto, mainly used by a local basketball team, was named after Štukelj, in addition to the University Sports Hall situated on the campus of the University of Maribor.

== Hall of Fame ==
- (1997) – was inducted into the International Gymnastics Hall of Fame
- (2011) – was inducted into the Slovenian Athletes Hall of Fame
