= France at the 1924 Summer Olympics =

- IOC code: FRA
- NOC: French Olympic Committee

in Paris
- Competitors: 401 (373 men and 28 women) in 20 sports
- Flag bearer: Géo André
- Medals Ranked 3rd: Gold 13 Silver 15 Bronze 10 Total 38

Summer Olympics appearances (overview)
- 1896; 1900; ~~1904~~; 1908; 1912; 1920; 1924; 1928; 1932; 1936; 1948; 1952; 1956; 1960; 1964; 1968; 1972; 1976; 1980; 1984; 1988; 1992; 1996; 2000; 2004; 2008; 2012; 2016; 2020; 2024; 2028

Other related appearances
- 1906 Intercalated Games

France was the host nation for the 1924 Summer Olympics in Paris. It was the second time that France had hosted the Games, after the 1900 Summer Olympics, also in Paris. 401 competitors, 373 men and 28 women, took part in 128 events in 20 sports.

== Medalists ==
| Medal | Name | Sport | Event | Date |
|---|---|---|---|---|
| Gold | Armand Blanchonnet | Cycling | Men's individual time trial | July 23 |
| Gold | Armand Blanchonnet, René Hamel, Georges Wambst | Cycling | Men's team time trial | July 23 |
| Gold | Lucien Michard | Cycling | Men's sprint | July 27 |
| Gold | Lucien Choury, Jean Cugnot | Cycling | Men's tandem | July 27 |
| Gold | Georges Buchard, Roger Ducret, Lucien Gaudin, André Labatut, Robert Liottel, Alexandre Lippmann, Georges Tainturier | Fencing | Men's team épée | July 9 |
| Gold | Roger Ducret | Fencing | Men's foil | July 4 |
| Gold | Philippe Cattiau, Jacques Coutrot, Roger Ducret, Lucien Gaudin, Henri Jobier, André Labatut, Guy de Luget, Joseph Perotaux | Fencing | Men's team foil | June 30 |
| Gold | Albert Séguin | Gymnastics | Men's sidehorse vault | July 22 |
| Gold | Pierre Coquelin de Lisle | Shooting | Men's 50 m rifle, prone | June 23 |
| Gold | France men's national water polo team: R. Bertrand; Albert Deborgies; Noël Delberghe; Robert Desmettre; Paul Dujardin; A. Fasani; Jean Lasquin; Albert Mayaud; Henri Padou; L. Perol; Georges Rigal | Water polo | | July 20 |
| Gold | Edmond Decottignies | Weightlifting | Men's 67.5 kg | July 22 |
| Gold | Charles Rigoulot | Weightlifting | Men's 82.5 kg | July 23 |
| Gold | Henri Deglane | Wrestling | Men's Greco-Roman heavyweight | July 10 |
| Silver | Roger Ducret | Fencing | Men's épée | July 11 |
| Silver | Roger Ducret | Fencing | Men's sabre | July 18 |
| Silver | Philippe Cattiau | Fencing | Men's foil | July 4 |
| Silver | Eugène Cordonnier, Léon Delsarte, François Gangloff, Jean Gounot, Arthur Hermann, Alphonse Higelin, Joseph Huber, Albert Séguin | Gymnastics | Men's team | July 23 |
| Silver | Albert Séguin | Gymnastics | Men's rope climbing | July 20 |
| Silver | Jean Gounot | Gymnastics | Men's sidehorse vault | July 22 |
| Silver | François Gangloff | Gymnastics | Men's sidehorse vault | July 22 |
| Silver | Marc Detton, Jean-Pierre Stock | Rowing | Men's double sculls | July 17 |
| Silver | Maurice Bouton, Georges Piot | Rowing | Men's coxless pair | July 17 |
| Silver | Marcel Lepan, Eugène Constant, Louis Gressier, Georges Lecointe, Raymond Talleux | Rowing | Men's coxed four | July 17 |
| Silver | France national rugby union team: F. Abraham; René Araou; Jean Bayard; Louis Béguet; André Béhotéguy; Marcel Besson; Alexandre Bioussa; Étienne Bonnes; François Borde; Adolphe Bousquet; Aimé Cassayet-Armagnac; F. Cayrol; François Clauzel; Clément Dupont; Albert Dupouy; Jean Etcheberry; E. Frayssinet; Henri Galau; Gilbert Gérintès; Charles Gonnet; Raoul Got; Adolphe Jauréguy; René Lasserre; Louis Lepatey; Marcel-Frédéric Lubin-Lebrère; Camille Montade; Roger Piteu; Étienne Piquiral; Eugène Ribère; Jean Vaysse | Rugby union | | May 18 |
| Silver | Paul Colas, Albert Courquin, Pierre Hardy, Georges Roes, Émile Rumeau | Shooting | Men's team free rifle | June 27 |
| Silver | Henri Cochet | Tennis | Men's singles | July 20 |
| Silver | Jacques Brugnon, Henri Cochet | Tennis | Men's doubles | July 21 |
| Silver | Julie Vlasto | Tennis | Women's singles | July 20 |
| Bronze | Paul Bontemps | Athletics | Men's 3000 m steeplechase | July 9 |
| Bronze | Gaston Heuet, Henri Lauvaux, Maurice Norland | Athletics | Men's team cross country | July 12 |
| Bronze | Pierre Lewden | Athletics | Men's high jump | July 7 |
| Bronze | Jean Ces | Boxing | Men's bantamweight | July 20 |
| Bronze | René Hamel | Cycling | Men's individual time trial | July 23 |
| Bronze | Jean Cugnot | Cycling | Men's sprint | July 27 |
| Bronze | Xavier Lesage | Equestrian | Individual dressage | July 25 |
| Bronze | Alphonse Higelin | Gymnastics | Men's horizontal bar | July 17 |
| Bronze | Louis Charles Breguet, Pierre Gauthier, Robert Girardet, André Guerrier, Georges Mollard | Sailing | 8 m Class | July 26 |
| Bronze | Jean Borotra, René Lacoste | Tennis | Men's doubles | July 21 |

== Athletics ==
Seventy athletes represented France in 1924. It was the nation's sixth appearance in the sport as well as the Games. The French athletes won three bronze medals, in the team cross country, the high jump, and the steeplechase.

Ranks given are within the heat.

| Athlete | Event | Heats | | Quarterfinals | | Semifinals | | Final | |
| Athlete | Event | Result | Rank | Result | Rank | Result | Rank | Result | Rank |
|---|---|---|---|---|---|---|---|---|---|
| Louis Albinet | Long jump | N/A | | | | 6.55 | 7 | Did not advance | |
| Gilbert Allart | 110 m hurdles | N/A | | 16.2 | 2 Q | 16.2 | 5 | Did not advance | |
| Géo André | 400 m hurdles | N/A | | 56.0 | 1 Q | 56.7 | 2 Q | 56.2 | 4 |
| Pierre Arnaudin | 400 m hurdles | N/A | | Did not finish | | Did not advance | | | |
| Georges Baraton | 800 m | N/A | | 1:59.2 | 2 Q | 1:57.6 | 7 | Did not advance | |
| Édouard Barbazan | High jump | N/A | | | | 1.80 | 2 | Did not advance | |
| Paul Béranger | Discus throw | N/A | | | | 38.93 | 6 | Did not advance | |
| Henri Bernard | 110 m hurdles | N/A | | Did not finish | | Did not advance | | | |
| Paul Bontemps | 3000 m steeplechase | N/A | | | | 9:47.2 | 2 Q | 9:45.2 | 3rd place, bronze medalist(s) |
| Maxime Bousselaire | Shot put | N/A | | | | 12.265 | 6 | Did not advance | |
| Robert Chottin | 1500 m | N/A | | | | 4:14.8 | 4 | Did not advance | |
| André Clayeux | Triple jump | N/A | | | | No mark | 10 | Did not advance | |
| Henri Clermont | 10 km walk | N/A | | | | Unknown | 5 Q | 51:41.6 | 10 |
| Paul Couillaud | Long jump | N/A | | | | 6.22 | 5 | Did not advance | |
| Léon Courtejaire | Pentathlon | N/A | | | | | | Elim-3 | |
| Maurice Deconninck | 3000 m steeplechase | N/A | | | | 10:19.0 | 4 | Did not advance | |
| François Decrombecque | 10 km walk | N/A | | | | Disqualified | | Did not advance | |
| Emmanuel Degland | Javelin throw | N/A | | | | 48.57 | 11 | Did not advance | |
| Maurice Degrelle | 100 m | 11.0 | 1 Q | 11.0 | 2 Q | 11.4 | 5 | Did not advance | |
| Maurice Degrelle | 200 m | 22.6 | 1 Q | 22.4 | 3 | Did not advance | | | |
| Lucien Dolques | 5000 m | N/A | | | | 15:29.4 | 2 Q | 15:32.6 | 7 |
| Lucien Dolques | Cross country | N/A | | | | | | Did not finish | |
| Paul Dufauret | Pole vault | N/A | | | | 3.55 | 4 | Did not advance | |
| Édouard Dupiré | High jump | N/A | | | | No mark | 3 | Did not advance | |
| Lucien Duquesne | 5000 m | N/A | | | | 16:03.0 | 5 | Did not advance | |
| Robert Duthil | Pole vault | N/A | | | | 3.40 | 5 | Did not advance | |
| Boughéra El-Ouafi | Marathon | N/A | | | | | | 2:54:19.6 | 7 |
| Barthélémy Favodon | 400 m | 51.2 | 1 Q | 50.9 | 3 | Did not advance | | | |
| Gaston Féry | 400 m | 51.1 | 2 Q | 50.7 | 4 | Did not advance | | | |
| André Fouache | 400 m hurdles | N/A | | 1:00.0 | 5 | Did not advance | | | |
| Raymond Fritz | 400 m | 51.0 | 2 Q | 50.5 | 5 | Did not advance | | | |
| Taka Gangué | Javelin throw | N/A | | | | 54.65 | 5 | Did not advance | |
| Mohammed Ghermati | Marathon | N/A | | | | | | 3:20:27.0 | 24 |
| Maurice Grosclaude | 800 m | N/A | | Unknown | 4 | Did not advance | | | |
| Marcel Guillouet | Long jump | N/A | | | | 6.62 | 4 | Did not advance | |
| Pierre Guilloux | High jump | N/A | | | | 1.83 | 1 Q | 1.85 | 7 |
| Albert Heisé | 100 m | 11.2 | 1 Q | Unknown | 4 | Did not advance | | | |
| Gaston Heuet | 10000 m | N/A | | | | | | 32:52.0 | 12 |
| Gaston Heuet | Cross country | N/A | | | | | | 37:52.0 | 10 |
| Amédée Isola | 3000 m steeplechase | N/A | | | | 9:57.8 | 1 Q | 10:14.8 | 8 |
| Joseph Jackson | 200 m | 22.8 | 1 Q | Unknown | 3 | Did not advance | | | |
| Raymond Jamois | 400 m | Unknown | 4 | Did not advance | | | | | |
| René Jubeau | 1500 m | N/A | | | | 4:14.5 | 4 | Did not advance | |
| André Lausseigh | Cross country | N/A | | | | | | Did not finish | |
| Henri Lauvaux | 10000 m | N/A | | | | | | 32:48.0 | 11 |
| Henri Lauvaux | Cross country | N/A | | | | | | 36:44.8 | 5 |
| Georges Leclerc | 3000 m steeplechase | N/A | | | | 10:20.0 | 6 | Did not advance | |
| Pierre Lewden | High jump | N/A | | | | 1.83 | 1 Q | 1.92 | 3rd place, bronze medalist(s) |
| Jean-Baptiste Manhès | Marathon | N/A | | | | | | 3:00:34.0 | 12 |
| Robert Marchal | 10000 m | N/A | | | | | | 32:33.0 | 9 |
| Robert Marchal | Cross country | N/A | | | | | | Did not finish | |
| Léonard Mascaux | 5000 m | N/A | | | | 15:26.4 | 4 Q | 15:39.0 | 9 |
| André Mourlon | 100 m | 11.0 | 1 Q | 11.1 | 3 | Did not advance | | | |
| André Mourlon | 200 m | 21.8 | 2 Q | 22.1 | 2 Q | 22.2 | 4 | Did not advance | |
| René Mourlon | 100 m | 11.0 | 2 Q | 11.0 | 4 | Did not advance | | | |
| Marcel Muzard | Pole vault | N/A | | | | 3.40 | 7 | Did not advance | |
| Taki N'Dio | Javelin throw | N/A | | | | 48.92 | 10 | Did not advance | |
| Maurice Norland | 5000 m | N/A | | | | 15:41.4 | 5 | Did not advance | |
| Maurice Norland | Cross country | N/A | | | | | | 41:48.3 | 15 |
| Raoul Paoli | Shot put | N/A | | | | 13.535 | 4 | Did not advance | |
| Pierre Parrain | 200 m | Unknown | 4 | Did not advance | | | | | |
| Louis Philipps | 800 m | N/A | | 1:58.6 | 2 Q | Unknown | 8 | Did not advance | |
| Louis Philipps | 1500 m | N/A | | | | 4:13.4 | 4 | Did not advance | |
| Daniel Pierre | Shot put | N/A | | | | 13.07 | 7 | Did not advance | |
| Daniel Pierre | Discus throw | N/A | | | | 37.015 | 5 | Did not advance | |
| Robert Saint-Pé | Hammer throw | N/A | | | | 36.27 | 10 | Did not advance | |
| Ciré Samba | Javelin throw | N/A | | | | 48.65 | 11 | Did not advance | |
| Gabriel Sempé | 110 m hurdles | N/A | | 15.6 | 2 Q | 15.3 | 3 | Did not advance | |
| Gabriel Sempé | Decathlon | N/A | | | | | | Did not finish | |
| Guillaume Tell | 10000 m | N/A | | | | | | 32:12.0 | 7 |
| Maurice Vautier | Pole vault | N/A | | | | 3.55 | 5 | Did not advance | |
| Georges Verger | Marathon | N/A | | | | | | Did not finish | |
| Roger Viel | 400 m hurdles | N/A | | 57.2 | 1 Q | 56.7 | 5 | Did not advance | |
| Roger Viel | Pentathlon | N/A | | | | | | Elim-3 | |
| Louis Wilhelme | Long jump | N/A | | | | 6.99 | 1 Q | 6.99 | 5 |
| Louis Wilhelme | Triple jump | N/A | | | | 12.66 | 9 | Did not advance | |
| René Wiriath | 800 m | N/A | | 1:59.0 | 1 Q | 1:59.6 | 7 | Did not advance | |
| René Wiriath | 1500 m | N/A | | | | 4:13.8 | 1 Q | 4:02.8 | 10 |
| Pierre Zaïdin | Hammer throw | N/A | | | | 36.155 | 12 | Did not advance | |
| Maurice Degrelle; Albert Heise; André Mourlon; René Mourlon | 4 × 100 m relay | N/A | | 44.5 | 2 Q | 42.5 | 2 Q | 43.3 | 5 |
| Barthélémy Favodon; Gaston Féry; Raymond Fritz; Francis Galtier | 4 × 400 m relay | N/A | | | | 3:30.0 | 1 Q | 3:23.4 | 5 |
| Camille Barbaud; Paul Bontemps; Armand Burtin; Lucien Duquesne; Jean Keller; Léonard Mascaux | 3000 m team race | N/A | | | | 18 | 2 Q | 31 | 4 |
| Lucien Dolquès; Gaston Heuet; André Lausseigh; Henri Lauvaux; Robert Marchal; Maurice Norland | Team cross country | N/A | | | | | | 20 | 3rd place, bronze medalist(s) |

== Boxing ==
Sixteen boxers represented France at the 1924 Games; France was one of four nations to have two wrestlers in each weight class (along with Great Britain, Italy, and the United States). It was the nation's third appearance in the sport. Ces won France's only boxing medal with his bronze in the bantamweight.

| Boxer | Weight class | Round of 32 | Round of 16 | Quarterfinals | Semifinals | Final / Bronze match | |
| Boxer | Weight class | Opposition Score | Opposition Score | Opposition Score | Opposition Score | Opposition Score | Rank |
|---|---|---|---|---|---|---|---|
| Roger Brousse | Middleweight | Bye | Gallardo (ARG); W | Mallin (GBR); L | Did not advance | | 5 |
| Jean Ces | Bantamweight | Bernasconi (ITA); W | Sybille (BEL); W | Barber (GBR); W | Smith (RSA); L | Andrén (SWE); W | 3rd place, bronze medalist(s) |
| Daniel Daney | Middleweight | Bonfigli (ITA); W | Van Haelen (BEL); W | Beecken (BEL); L | Did not advance | | 5 |
| Marcel Depont | Featherweight | Eustice (RSA); W | Smoris (URU); W | Quartucci (ARG); L | Did not advance | | 5 |
| Gaston Doussot | Welterweight | Mello (USA); L | Did not advance | | | | 17 |
| René Dubois | Welterweight | O'Hanrahan (GBR); L | Did not advance | | | | 17 |
| Robert Fouquet | Light heavyweight | Bye | Mitchell (GBR); L | Did not advance | | | 9 |
| Georges Galinat | Heavyweight | N/A | Greathouse (USA); L | Did not advance | | | 9 |
| Georges Gourdy | Flyweight | Bye | Castellenghi (ITA); L | Did not advance | | | 9 |
| Jacques Lemouton | Bantamweight | Bye | Pastor (ESP); W | Smith (RSA); L | Did not advance | | 5 |
| Charles Peguilhan | Heavyweight | N/A | Porzio (ARG); L | Did not advance | | | 9 |
| Georges Rossignon | Light heavyweight | Correa (CHI); W | Grillo (ITA); W | Mitchell (GBR); L | Did not advance | | 5 |
| Richard Savignac | Lightweight | De Petrillo (ITA); W | Nielsen (DEN); L | Did not advance | | | 9 |
| Henri Stuckemann | Featherweight | Quartucci (ARG); L | Did not advance | | | | 17 |
| Arnold Tholey | Lightweight | Purdy (NZL); W | Nicolares (URU); W | Beland (RSA); W | Copello (ARG); L | Boylstein (USA); L | 4 |
| Raymond Trève | Flyweight | Debleyser (BEL); W | Bergström (SWE); L | Did not advance | | | 9 |

| Opponent nation | Wins | Losses | Percent |
|---|---|---|---|
| Argentina | 1 | 4 | .200 |
| Belgium | 3 | 1 | .750 |
| Chile | 1 | 0 | 1.000 |
| Denmark | 0 | 1 | .000 |
| Great Britain | 1 | 4 | .200 |
| Italy | 4 | 1 | .800 |
| New Zealand | 1 | 0 | 1.000 |
| South Africa | 2 | 2 | .500 |
| Spain | 1 | 0 | 1.000 |
| Sweden | 1 | 1 | .500 |
| United States | 0 | 3 | .000 |
| Uruguay | 2 | 0 | 1.000 |
| Total | 17 | 17 | .500 |

| Round | Wins | Losses | Percent |
|---|---|---|---|
| Round of 32 | 7 | 3 | .700 |
| Round of 16 | 7 | 6 | .538 |
| Quarterfinals | 2 | 5 | .286 |
| Semifinals | 0 | 2 | .000 |
| Final | 0 | 0 | – |
| Bronze match | 1 | 1 | .500 |
| Total | 17 | 17 | .500 |

== Cycling ==
Eleven cyclists represented France in 1924. It was the nation's sixth appearance in the sport. Overall, the French cyclists won six medals, including four golds.

The French road cyclists, led by Blanchonnet, dominated the time trials. The French took both gold medals (in the team event and Blanchonnet in the individual), took three out of a possible four total medals, and had each of the four cyclists finish in the top ten individually. Hamel took the individual bronze.

In track cycling, the French team took two of the four gold medals. Michard won the sprint championship, while Cugnot and Choury won the tandem. Cugnot also earned a bronze in the sprint.

=== Road cycling ===
Ranks given are within the heat.

| Cyclist | Event | Final | |
| Cyclist | Event | Result | Rank |
|---|---|---|---|
| Armand Blanchonnet | Time trial | 6:20:48.0 | 1st place, gold medalist(s) |
| René Hamel | Time trial | 6:30:51.6 | 3rd place, bronze medalist(s) |
| André Leducq | Time trial | 6:39:16.0 | 9 |
| Georges Wambst | Time trial | 6:38:34.4 | 8 |
| Armand Blanchonnet; René Hamel; André Leducq; Georges Wambst | Team time trial | 19:30:14.0 | 1st place, gold medalist(s) |

=== Track cycling ===
Ranks given are within the heat.

| Cyclist | Event | First round | | First repechage | | Quarterfinals | | Second repechage | | Semifinals | | Final | |
| Cyclist | Event | Result | Rank | Result | Rank | Result | Rank | Result | Rank | Result | Rank | Result | Rank |
|---|---|---|---|---|---|---|---|---|---|---|---|---|---|
| Lucien Choury | 50 km | N/A | | | | | | | | | | Unknown | 8–36 |
| Jean Cugnot | Sprint | 12.8 | 1 Q | Advanced directly | | 13.2 | 1 Q | Advanced directly | | 12.2 | 1 Q | Unknown | 3rd place, bronze medalist(s) |
| Édouard Meunier | 50 km | N/A | | | | | | | | | | Unknown | 8–36 |
| Lucien Michard | Sprint | 13.6 | 1 Q | Advanced directly | | 13.0 | 1 Q | Advanced directly | | 12.2 | 1 Q | 12.8 | 1st place, gold medalist(s) |
| Lucien Choury; Jean Cugnot | Tandem | N/A | | | | | | | | 14.0 | 1 Q | 12.06 | 1st place, gold medalist(s) |
| Lucien Choury; René Guillemin; René Hournon; Marcel Renaud | Team pursuit | 5:11.4 | 1 Q | N/A | | 5:14.2 | 1 Q | N/A | | 5:19.6 | 2 r | Unknown | 4 |

== Diving ==
Twelve divers, nine men and three women, represented France in 1924. It was the nation's second appearance in the sport, and the first time France sent female divers. The fifth-place finishes by Lenormand and Raymond Vincent were France's best diving results to date.

Ranks given are within the heat.

Men

| Diver | Event | Semifinals | | | Final | | |
| Diver | Event | Points | Score | Rank | Points | Score | Rank |
|---|---|---|---|---|---|---|---|
| André Cochinal | 10 m platform | 21 | 374.2 | 4 | Did not advance | | |
| Émile Dauvet | Plain high diving | 19.5 | 147 | 4 | Did not advance | | |
| Georges Garreau | Plain high diving | 27 | 127 | 5 | Did not advance | | |
| Antoine Jacob | 3 m board | 23 | 425.4 | 5 | Did not advance | | |
| Eugène Lenormand | 10 m platform | 13 | 435.6 | 3 Q | 24 | 437.7 | 5 |
| Paul Raeth | 3 m board | 19 | 455.5 | 4 | Did not advance | | |
| Étienne Vincent | 10 m platform | 28 | 354 | 6 | Did not advance | | |
| Raymond Vincent | Plain high diving | 17 | 155 | 3 Q | 26.5 | 144 | 5 |
| Rémy Weil | 3 m board | 18 | 497.9 | 4 | Did not advance | | |

Women

| Diver | Event | Semifinals | | | Final | | |
| Diver | Event | Points | Score | Rank | Points | Score | Rank |
|---|---|---|---|---|---|---|---|
| Eugénie Briollet | 3 m board | 40 | 235.2 | 8 | Did not advance | | |
| Louise Lenormand | 3 m board | 26 | 313.0 | 5 | Did not advance | | |
| Suzanne Raeth | 3 m board | 32.5 | 274.0 | 6 | Did not advance | | |

== Equestrian ==
Twelve equestrians represented France in 1924, tying France with Sweden for the most (and maximum) representatives in the sport. It was the nation's fourth appearance in the sport; France, Belgium, and the United States were the only three countries to have competed in each edition of the Olympic equestrian competitions to that point. Xavier Lesage won France's only equestrian medal in 1924, a bronze in the dressage. It was the first time that France finished with fewer than two medals, and the first time France did not earn at least a silver medal.

| Equestrian | Event | Final | | |
| Equestrian | Event | Score | Time | Rank |
|---|---|---|---|---|
| Michel Artola | Eventing | 737.0 | N/A | 30 |
| Michel Bignon | Jumping | Did not finish | | |
| Antoine Bourcier | Dressage | 228.0 | N/A | 15 |
| Théophile Carbon | Jumping | Did not finish | | |
| Pierre Clavé | Jumping | 41.00 | 3:23.0 | 33 |
| Henri de Royer-Dupré | Jumping | Did not finish | | |
| Camille de Sartiges | Eventing | Did not finish | | |
| Jean le Vavasseur | Eventing | Did not finish | | |
| Xavier Lesage | Dressage | 265.8 | N/A | 3rd place, bronze medalist(s) |
| Louis Saint-Fort Paillard | Dressage | 237.0 | N/A | 10 |
| Louis Rigon | Eventing | Did not finish | | |
| Robert Wallon | Dressage | 243.2 | N/A | 7 |
| Michel Artola; Camille de Sartiges; Jean le Vavasseur; Louis Rigon | Team eventing | Did not finish | | |
| Michel Bignon; Théophile Carbon; Pierre Clavé; Henri de Royer-Dupré | Team jumping | Did not finish | | |

== Fencing ==
24 fencers, 20 men and 4 women, represented France in 1924. It was the nation's fifth appearance in the sport. France won three gold medals and three silver medals, all in the six men's events. 11 of the country's 13 entries reached the finals; the sabre team Perrodon in the individual sabre were the only entries which did not get past the semifinals. In contrast, none of the four French women advanced to the final.

Ducret had the best results of any fencer in 1924, winning five medals. He took medals in all three of the individual competitions, including gold in the foil and silver in the other two events. Ducret was also on the two gold medal teams, for the foil and épée. Cattiau finished second to Ducret in the foil, with his only loss in 24 bouts being the loss to Ducret in the final pool (Ducret had won only 19 of his 24 matches on his way to the gold medal, but went 6 and 0 in the final pool).

Men

Ranks given are within the pool.

| Fencer | Event | Round 1 | | Round 2 | | Quarterfinals | | Semifinals | | Final | |
| Fencer | Event | Result | Rank | Result | Rank | Result | Rank | Result | Rank | Result | Rank |
|---|---|---|---|---|---|---|---|---|---|---|---|
| Georges Buchard | Épée | 5–4 | 3 Q | N/A | | 6–3 | 1 Q | 7–4 | 2 Q | 5–6 | 7 |
| Philippe Cattiau | Foil | 4–0 | 1 Q | 4–0 | 1 Q | 5–0 | 1 Q | 5–0 | 1 Q | 5–1 | 2nd place, silver medalist(s) |
| Georges Conraux | Sabre | N/A | | | | 4–2 | 3 Q | 5–3 | 4 Q | 2–5 | 7 |
| Gaston Cornereau | Épée | 7–1 | 1 Q | N/A | | 5–4 | 5 Q | 6–5 | 2 Q | 7–4 | 4 |
| Jacques Coutrot | Foil | 4–0 | 1 Q | 4–1 | 2 Q | 3–2 | 3 Q | 3–2 | 3 Q | 3–3 | 4 |
| Roger Ducret | Épée | 6–2 | 1 Q | N/A | | 4–5 | 6 Q | 6–5 | 2 Q | 7–4 | 2nd place, silver medalist(s) |
| Roger Ducret | Foil | 3–0 | 1 Q | 3–2 | 3 Q | 3–2 | 2 Q | 4–1 | 1 Q | 6–0 | 1st place, gold medalist(s) |
| Roger Ducret | Sabre | N/A | | | | 6–0 | 1 Q | 7–1 | 1 Q | 5–2 | 2nd place, silver medalist(s) |
| Armand Massard | Épée | 5–3 | 2 Q | N/A | | 4–6 | 6 Q | 7–4 | 2 Q | 7–4 | 5 |
| Marc Perrodon | Sabre | N/A | | | | 6–1 | 3 Q | 2–6 | 7 | Did not advance | |
| Georges Conraux; Henri de Saint Germain; Jean Jannekeyn; Lionel Lifschitz; Marc Perrodon; Maurice Taillandier | Team sabre | Bye | | N/A | | 2–0 | 1 Q | 0–2 | 3 | Did not advance | |
| Georges Buchard; Roger Ducret; Lucien Gaudin; André Labatut; Alexandre Lippmann; Robert Liottel; Georgers Tainturier | Team épée | 1–0 | 1 Q | N/A | | 1–0 | 1 Q | 1–0 | 1 Q | 3–0 | 1st place, gold medalist(s) |
| Philippe Cattiau; Jacques Coutrot; Guy De Luget; Roger Ducret; Lucien Gaudin; Henri Jobier; André Labattut; Josef Peroteaux | Team foil | 1–0 | 1 Q | N/A | | 2–0 | 1 Q | 2–0 | 1 Q | 2–0 | 1st place, gold medalist(s) |

Women

Ranks given are within the pool.

| Fencer | Event | Quarterfinals | | Semifinals | | Final | |
| Fencer | Event | Result | Rank | Result | Rank | Result | Rank |
|---|---|---|---|---|---|---|---|
| Michele Bory | Foil | 3–2 | 4 | Did not advance | | | |
| Yvonne Conte | Foil | 3–3 | 5 | Did not advance | | | |
| Lucie Prost | Foil | 4–1 | 1 Q | 2–3 | 4 | Did not advance | |
| Fernande Tassy | Foil | 3–2 | 2 Q | 1–4 | 6 | Did not advance | |

== Football ==
France competed in the Olympic football tournament for the fourth time in 1924.

Round 1
Bye

Round 2

May 27, 1924

| France | 7–0 | Latvia |
|---|---|---|
| Crut 17' 28' 55'; Nicolas 25' 50'; Boyer 71' 87' | Report |

Stade de Paris
Attendance: 15,000
Referee: Henri Christophe (BEL)

Quarterfinals

June 1, 1924

| France | 1–5 | Uruguay |
|---|---|---|
| Nicolas 12' | Report | Scarone 2' 24'; Petrone 58' 68'; Romano 83' |

Stade Olympique, Colombes
Attendance: 45,000
Referee: P. Chr. Andersen (NOR)

Final rank
5th place

== Gymnastics ==
Eight gymnasts represented France in 1924. It was the nation's sixth appearance in the sport, matching Great Britain for most appearances to that point. The French team performed well, with two gymnasts in the top ten and the overall score for the eight gymnasts earning the nation a silver medal in the team competition.

The French swept the medals in the sidehorse vault apparatus, with Séguin's gold and two silvers after Gounot and Gangloff tied for second. Séguin also won silver in the rope climbing. Higelin took bronze in the horizontal bar. Despite Séguin's pair of apparatus medals, he finished 15th overall—and third among the French squad. Gounot, at eighth place, was the highest ranked French gymnast in the all-around.

=== Artistic ===
| Gymnast | Event | Final | |
| Gymnast | Event | Score | Rank |
|---|---|---|---|
| Eugène Cordonnier | All-around | 99.906 | 21 |
| Eugène Cordonnier | Horizontal bar | 15.886 | 33 |
| Eugène Cordonnier | Parallel bars | 20.50 | 18 |
| Eugène Cordonnier | Pommel horse | 19.190 | 11 |
| Eugène Cordonnier | Rings | 20.900 | 10 |
| Eugène Cordonnier | Rope climbing | 8 (9.4 s) | 24 |
| Eugène Cordonnier | Sidehorse vault | 9.80 | 8 |
| Eugène Cordonnier | Vault | 5.63 | 51 |
| Léon Delsarte | All-around | 104.739 | 9 |
| Léon Delsarte | Horizontal bar | 18.633 | 10 |
| Léon Delsarte | Parallel bars | 20.70 | 17 |
| Léon Delsarte | Pommel horse | 16.570 | 33 |
| Léon Delsarte | Rings | 20.566 | 14 |
| Léon Delsarte | Rope climbing | 10 (8.8 s) | 13 |
| Léon Delsarte | Sidehorse vault | 9.50 | 21 |
| Léon Delsarte | Vault | 8.77 | 20 |
| François Gangloff | All-around | 98.796 | 23 |
| François Gangloff | Horizontal bar | 18.933 | 7 |
| François Gangloff | Parallel bars | 20.13 | 26 |
| François Gangloff | Pommel horse | 16.770 | 32 |
| François Gangloff | Rings | 20.603 | 13 |
| François Gangloff | Rope climbing | 5 (10.0 s) | 39 |
| François Gangloff | Sidehorse vault | 9.93 | 2nd place, silver medalist(s) |
| François Gangloff | Vault | 7.43 | 33 |
| Jean Gounot | All-around | 105.153 | 8 |
| Jean Gounot | Horizontal bar | 19.043 | 6 |
| Jean Gounot | Parallel bars | 20.15 | 25 |
| Jean Gounot | Pommel horse | 17.300 | 27 |
| Jean Gounot | Rings | 19.730 | 19 |
| Jean Gounot | Rope climbing | 10 (8.4 s) | 6 |
| Jean Gounot | Sidehorse vault | 9.93 | 2nd place, silver medalist(s) |
| Jean Gounot | Vault | 9.00 | 18 |
| Arthur Hermann | All-around | 95.796 | 27 |
| Arthur Hermann | Horizontal bar | 17.503 | 17 |
| Arthur Hermann | Parallel bars | 20.13 | 26 |
| Arthur Hermann | Pommel horse | 19.460 | 9 |
| Arthur Hermann | Rings | 19.703 | 20 |
| Arthur Hermann | Rope climbing | 10 (8.4 s) | 6 |
| Arthur Hermann | Sidehorse vault | 9.00 | 37 |
| Arthur Hermann | Vault | 0.00 | 67 |
| André Higelin | All-around | 92.133 | 34 |
| André Higelin | Horizontal bar | 19.163 | 3rd place, bronze medalist(s) |
| André Higelin | Parallel bars | 19.48 | 33 |
| André Higelin | Pommel horse | 12.790 | 49 |
| André Higelin | Rings | 17.870 | 31 |
| André Higelin | Rope climbing | 6 (9.8 s) | 35 |
| André Higelin | Sidehorse vault | 9.70 | 14 |
| André Higelin | Vault | 7.13 | 40 |
| Joseph Huber | All-around | 88.119 | 39 |
| Joseph Huber | Horizontal bar | 12.686 | 53 |
| Joseph Huber | Parallel bars | 19.98 | 29 |
| Joseph Huber | Pommel horse | 16.430 | 34 |
| Joseph Huber | Rings | 19.033 | 24 |
| Joseph Huber | Rope climbing | 5 (10.2 s) | 41 |
| Joseph Huber | Sidehorse vault | 9.57 | 18 |
| Joseph Huber | Vault | 5.42 | 54 |
| Albert Séguin | All-around | 102.326 | 15 |
| Albert Séguin | Horizontal bar | 15.683 | 36 |
| Albert Séguin | Parallel bars | 20.13 | 26 |
| Albert Séguin | Pommel horse | 16.430 | 34 |
| Albert Séguin | Rings | 20.633 | 12 |
| Albert Séguin | Rope climbing | 10 (7.4 s) | 2nd place, silver medalist(s) |
| Albert Séguin | Sidehorse vault | 10.00 | 1st place, gold medalist(s) |
| Albert Séguin | Vault | 9.45 | 13 |
| Eugène Cordonnier; Léon Delsarte; François Gangloff; Jean Gounot; Arthur Hermann; André Higelin; Joseph Huber; Albert Séguin | Team | 820.528 | 2nd place, silver medalist(s) |

== Modern pentathlon ==
Four pentathletes represented France in 1924. It was the nation's third appearance in the sport. France was one of six nations to have competed in each edition of the Olympic modern pentathlon to that time.

| Pentathlete | Event | Final | |
| Pentathlete | Event | Score | Rank |
|---|---|---|---|
| Guillaume de Tournemire | Individual | 107 | 23 |
| Raoul Lignon | Individual | 99 | 20 |
| Ivan Duranthon | Individual | 54.5 | 4 |
| Charles-Jean LeVavasseur | Individual | 82.5 | 12 |

== Polo ==
France sent a polo team to the Olympics for the second time in 1924. The French team lost all four of its matches in the round-robin tournament.

Ranks given are within the pool.

| Players | Event | Round robin | | | | |
| Players | Event | Wins | Losses | Points for | Points against | Rank |
|---|---|---|---|---|---|---|
| Pierre de Chapelle; Hubert de Monbrison; Charles de Polignac; Jules Macaire; Jean Pastre | Men's polo | 0 | 4 | 6 | 59 | 5 |

June 28

| United States | 13–1 | France |

July 5

| Great Britain | 16–2 | France |

July 10

| Spain | 15–1 | France |

July 12

| Argentina | 15–2 | France |

== Rowing ==
23 rowers represented France in 1924. It was the nation's fourth appearance in the sport. France took three silver medals.

Ranks given are within the heat.

| Rower | Event | Semifinals | | Repechage | | Final | |
| Rower | Event | Result | Rank | Result | Rank | Result | Rank |
|---|---|---|---|---|---|---|---|
| Marc Detton | Single sculls | Unknown | 2 r | Unknown | 2 | Did not advance | |
| Maurice Monney-Bouton; Georges Piot | Coxless pair | 9:42.2 | 1 Q | Advanced directly | | 8:21.6 | 2nd place, silver medalist(s) |
| Marc Detton; Jean-Pierre Stock | Double sculls | Unknown | 2 Q | N/A | | 6:38.0 | 2nd place, silver medalist(s) |
| Eugène Constant; Marcel Lepan; Raymond Talleux | Coxed pair | 7:36.6 | 1 Q | N/A | | Unknown | 4 |
| Albert Bonzano; Henri Bonzano; Jean Camuset; Théo Cremnitz | Coxless four | Unknown | 2 Q | N/A | | Unknown | 4 |
| Marcel Lepan; Eugène Constant; Louis Gressier; Georges Lecointe; Raymond Talleux | Coxed four | 7:10.0 | 1 Q | Advanced directly | | 7:21.6 | 2nd place, silver medalist(s) |
| M. Baudechon; J. Betout; Louis Carlier; Michel Fourny; Henri Gatineau; André Lancelot; Henri Menard; André Oriol; Fernand Oriol | Eight | Unknown | 4 | Did not advance | | | |

== Rugby union ==
France sent a rugby team to the Olympics for the third time in 1924. The defending silver medalists won their first game against Romania, 61 to 3. After the United States also beat Romania, the three-team round-robin finished with the France-United States match. The Americans won the rematch of the 1920 game, 17 to 3, as France finished second again.

Ranks given are within the pool.

| Team | Event | Round robin | | | | |
| Team | Event | Wins | Losses | Points for | Points against | Rank |
|---|---|---|---|---|---|---|
| France | Men's rugby union | 1 | 1 | 64 | 20 | 2nd place, silver medalist(s) |

May 4

| France | 61–3 | Romania |

Stade Olympique
May 18

| United States | 17–3 | France |

Stade Olympique

== Sailing ==
Nine sailors, the maximum possible, represented France in 1924. It was the nation's fifth appearance in the sport; France was the only country to have competed in each edition of the Olympic sailing contests to that point.

| Sailor | Event | Qualifying | | | | Final | | | |
| Sailor | Event | Race 1 | Race 2 | Race 3 | Total | Race 1 | Race 2 | Total | Rank |
|---|---|---|---|---|---|---|---|---|---|
| André Michelet | Olympic monotype | 4 | 5 | N/A | | Did not advance | | | |
| Georges Herpin; Henri Louit; Édouard Moussié | 6 metre class | 8 | 3 | 5 | 16 | Did not advance | | | 5 |
| Louis Bréguet; Pierre Gauthier; Robert Girardet; André Guerrier; Georges Mollard | 8 metre class | 1 Q | 5 | 2 Q | 8 | 3 | 2 | 5 | 3rd place, bronze medalist(s) |

== Shooting ==
Twenty-two sport shooters represented France in 1924. It was the nation's sixth appearance in the sport; France was one of three countries (along with Denmark and Great Britain) to have competed in each Olympic shooting contest. French shooters took two medals: Coquelin won the gold in the prone rifle and was a member of the five-man team which took silver in the team rifle.

| Shooter | Event | Final | |
| Shooter | Event | Score | Rank |
|---|---|---|---|
| Marcel Adelon | 100 m deer, single shots | 28 | 23 |
| Marcel Adelon | 100 m deer, double shots | 52 | 21 |
| Georges Bordier | 50 m rifle, prone | 383 | 31 |
| André Chauvet | 100 m deer, single shots | 26 | 26 |
| André Chauvet | 100 m deer, double shots | 51 | 22 |
| Pierre Coquelin de Lisle | 50 m rifle, prone | 398 | 1st place, gold medalist(s) |
| Albert Courquin | 600 m free rifle | 90 | 6 |
| Arnaud de Castelbajac | 25 m rapid fire pistol | 18 | 6 |
| Georges de Crequi-Montfort | 25 m rapid fire pistol | 16 | 21 |
| André de Schonen | 25 m rapid fire pistol | 17 | 9 |
| Louis Deloy | Trap | 95 | 9 |
| Jacques d'Imecourt | Trap | Unknown | 31–44 |
| Eugène Duflot | 100 m deer, single shots | 27 | 24 |
| Eugène Duflot | 100 m deer, double shots | 40 | 28 |
| Jules Mahieu | 100 m deer, single shots | 32 | 17 |
| Jules Mahieu | 100 m deer, double shots | 42 | 25 |
| Charles Riotteau | 25 m rapid fire pistol | 16 | 21 |
| Georges Roes | 600 m free rifle | Did not finish | |
| Émile Rumeau | 50 m rifle, prone | 387 | 20 |
| Émile Rumeau | 600 m free rifle | 86 | 10 |
| Paul Colas; Albert Courquin; Pierre Hardy; Georges Roes; Émile Rumeau | Team free rifle | 646 | 2nd place, silver medalist(s) |
| Georges de Bordus; Jean de Beaumont; Louis de Bourbon-Busset; Marcel de Lambertye; Louis Deloy; René Texier | Team clay pigeons | Unknown | 31–44 |

== Swimming ==
Ranks given are within the heat.

Men

| Swimmer | Event | Heats | | Semifinals | | Final | |
| Swimmer | Event | Result | Rank | Result | Rank | Result | Rank |
|---|---|---|---|---|---|---|---|
| Henri Bouvier | 200 m breaststroke | 3:07.8 | 3 | Did not advance | | | |
| Maurice Ducos | 100 m backstroke | 1:25.0 | 4 | Did not advance | | | |
| Gustave Klein | 1500 m freestyle | DNF | — | Did not advance | | | |
| Henri Padou | 100 m freestyle | 1:05.0 | 4 | Did not advance | | | |
| René Paulus | 100 m backstroke | 1:28.0 | 5 | Did not advance | | | |
| Salvator Pélégry | 400 m freestyle | 5:56.2 | 4 | Did not advance | | | |
| Salvator Pélégry | 1500 m freestyle | 24:07.6 | 3 | Did not advance | | | |
| Jean Rebeyrol | 1500 m freestyle | 24:46.4 | 4 | Did not advance | | | |
| Georges Vallerey | 200 m breaststroke | 3:11.2 | 6 | Did not advance | | | |
| Émile Zeibig | 100 m freestyle | 1:08.0 | 4 | Did not advance | | | |
| Émile Zeibig | 100 m backstroke | 1:22.4 | 2 Q | 1:23.4 | 3 | Did not advance | |
| Édouard van Zeveren | 100 m freestyle | 1:06.8 | 3 | Did not advance | | | |
| Édouard van Zeveren | 400 m freestyle | 5:59.8 | 4 | Did not advance | | | |
| Marius Zwiller | 200 m breaststroke | 3:11.2 | 5 | Did not advance | | | |
| Guy Middleton; Henri Padou; Édouard van Zeveren; Émile Zeibig | 4 × 200 m freestyle relay | 10:41.4 | 1 Q | 10:39.4 | 3 | Did not advance | |

Women

| Swimmer | Event | Heats | | Semifinals | | Final | |
| Swimmer | Event | Result | Rank | Result | Rank | Result | Rank |
|---|---|---|---|---|---|---|---|
| Suzanne Kiffer-Porte | 200 m breaststroke | —N/a | | 3:43.6 | 5 | Did not advance | |
| Ernestine Lebrun | 100 m freestyle | 1:23.4 | 3 | Did not advance | | | |
| Ernestine Lebrun | 400 m freestyle | 7:06.4 | 5 | Did not advance | | | |
| Odette Monard | 200 m breaststroke | —N/a | | 3:48.4 | 4 | Did not advance | |
| Gilberte Mortier | 400 m freestyle | 7:35.0 | 4 | Did not advance | | | |
| Mariette Protin | 100 m freestyle | 1:22.2 | 2 Q | 1:22.8 | 4 | Did not advance | |
| Mariette Protin | 400 m freestyle | 6:58.2 | 2 Q | 6:56.6 | 5 | Did not advance | |
| Lucienne Rouet | 100 m backstroke | —N/a | | 1:43.8 | 5 | Did not advance | |
| Alice Stoffel | 100 m backstroke | —N/a | | 1:44.0 | 4 | Did not advance | |
| Alice Stoffel | 200 m breaststroke | —N/a | | 3:48.0 | 5 | Did not advance | |
| Ernestine Lebrun; Gilberte Mortier; Bienna Pélégry and Mariette Protin | 4 × 100 m freestyle relay | —N/a | | | | 5:43.4 | 5 |

== Tennis ==
Men

| Athlete | Event | Round of 128 | Round of 64 | Round of 32 | Round of 16 | Quarterfinals | Semifinals | Final | |
| Athlete | Event | Opposition Score | Opposition Score | Opposition Score | Opposition Score | Opposition Score | Opposition Score | Opposition Score | Rank |
|---|---|---|---|---|---|---|---|---|---|
| Jean Borotra | Singles | Honda (JPN); W 6–3, 6–3, 7–5 | Torralva (CHI); W 9–7, 7–5, 7–5 | Nielsen (NOR); W 6–0, 6–1, 6–2 | Kingscote (GBR); W 6–1, 6–3, 6–1 | Jacob (IND); W 4–6, 6–4, 7–5, 6–3 | Cochet (FRA); L 2–6, 7–5, 2–6, 3–6 | Bronze medal final de Morpurgo (ITA); L 6–1, 1–6, 6–8, 6–4, 5–7 | 4 |
| Henri Cochet | Singles | Bye | Bye | Richardson (RSA); W 6–3, 6–4, 6–4 | Fukuda (JPN); W 6–2, 6–1, 6–3 | Williams (USA); W 5–7, 6–3, 6–2, 6–4 | Borotra (FRA); W 6–2, 5–7, 6–2, 6–3 | Richards (USA); L 4–6, 4–6, 7–5, 6–4, 2–6 | 2nd place, silver medalist(s) |
| Maurice Cousin | Singles | Condon (RSA); W 4–6, 6–3, 6–2, 6–4 | Wennergren (SWE); W 6–4, 6–3, 6–2 | Harada (JPN); L retired | Did not advance | | | | |
| Jean Lacoste | Singles | Bye | Göncz (HUN); W 6–0, 6–1, 6–1 | Koželuh (TCH); W 6–1, 6–2, 6–1 | Spence (RSA); W 6–2, 6–0, 6–1 | Richards (USA); W 6–8, 6–4, 6–1, 2–6, 3–6 | Did not advance | | |
| Jean Borotra; Jean Lacoste | Doubles | —N/a | Bye | Lammens / Halot (BEL); W 6–3, 6–0, 6–2 | Dumas / Robson (ARG); W 6–4, 6–1, 6–3 | Muhammad / Rutnam (IND); W 6–2, 6–2, 6–3 | Richards / Hunter (USA); L 2–6, 3–6, 6–0, 7–5, 3–6 | Bronze medal final Condon / Richardson (RSA); W 6–3, 10–8, 6–3 | 3rd place, bronze medalist(s) |
| Jacques Brugnon; Henri Cochet | Doubles | —N/a | Bye | Bye | de Morpurgo / Serventi (FRA); W 6–2, 6–4, 6–2 | Wennergren / Müller (FRA); W 6–4, 6–1, 6–4 | Condon / Richardson (RSA); W 5–7, 6–3, 7–5, 6–2 | Richards / Hunter (USA); L 6–4, 2–6, 3–6, 6–2, 3–6 | 2nd place, silver medalist(s) |

Women

| Athlete | Event | Round of 64 | Round of 32 | Round of 16 | Quarterfinals | Semifinals | Final | |
| Athlete | Event | Opposition Score | Opposition Score | Opposition Score | Opposition Score | Opposition Score | Opposition Score | Rank |
|---|---|---|---|---|---|---|---|---|
| A. Golding | Singles | von Essen (SWE); W 6–4, 6–2 | Bologna (ITA); W 6–0, 6–3 | Covell (GBR); W 6–3, 3–6, 6–2 | González-Álvarez (ESP); W 7–5, 6–3 | Wills Moody (USA); L 2–6, 1–6 | Bronze medal final McKane (GBR); L 7–5, 3–6, 0–6 | 4 |
| Jeanne Vaussard | Singles | Bye | Mallory (NOR); L 2–6, 3–6 | Did not advance | | | | |
| Julie Vlasto | Singles | Bye | Dahl (NOR); W 6–1, 6–0 | Goss (USA); W 6–3, 2–6, 6–4 | Shepherd-Barron (GBR); W 6–4, 6–2 | McKane (GBR); W 0–6, 7–5, 6–1 | Wills Moody (USA); L 2–6, 2–6 | 2nd place, silver medalist(s) |
| Marguerite Billout; Yvonne Bourgeois | Doubles | —N/a | Bye | Torras / González-Álvarez (ESP); W 2–6, 6–3, 6–4 | Gagliardi / Perelli (ITA); W 7–5, 6–1 | Covell / McKane (GBR); L 2–6, 2–6 | Bronze medal final Shepherd-Barron / Colyer (GBR); L 1–6, 2–6 | 4 |
| A. Golding; Jeanne Vaussard | Doubles | —N/a | Bye | Bye | Shepherd-Barron / Colyer (GBR); L 2–6, 2–6 | Did not advance | | |

Mixed

| Athlete | Event | Round of 32 | Round of 16 | Quarterfinals | Semifinals | Final | |
| Athlete | Event | Opposition Score | Opposition Score | Opposition Score | Opposition Score | Opposition Score | Rank |
|---|---|---|---|---|---|---|---|
| Marguerite Billout; Jean Borotra | Doubles | Jessup / Richards (USA); L 3–6, 1–6 | Did not advance | | | | |

== Water polo ==
France won its first gold medal in water polo in 1924, in its fourth appearance in Olympic competition in the sport.

Roster

- R. Bertrand
- Albert Delborgies
- Noël Delberghe
- Robert Desmettre
- Paul Dujardin
- A. Fasani
- Jean Lasquin
- Albert Mayaud
- Henri Padou
- L. Perol
- Georges Rigal

First round

| France | 3–1 | United States | Piscine des Tourelles |

Quarterfinals

| France | 6–3 | Netherlands | Piscine des Tourelles |

Semifinals

| France | 4–2 | Sweden | Piscine des Tourelles |

Final

| France | 3–0 | Belgium | Piscine des Tourelles |

== Weightlifting ==
| Athlete | Event | 1H Snatch | 1H Clean & Jerk | Press | Snatch | Clean & Jerk | Total | Rank |
|---|---|---|---|---|---|---|---|---|
| René Catalas | Men's -60 kg | 55 | 70 | 70 | 70 | 95 | 360 | 11 |
| Louis Dannoux | Men's +82.5 kg | | | | | | 497.5 | 4 |
| Edmond Decottignies | Men's -67.5 kg | 70 | 92.5 | 77.5 | 85 | 115 | 440 | 1st place, gold medalist(s) |
| André Delloue | Men's -67.5 kg | 62.5 | 65 | 72.5 | 87.5 | 112.5 | 400 | 11 |
| René Dupont | Men's +82.5 kg | | | | | | 440 | 15 |
| Claudius Dutriève | Men's +82.5 kg | | | | | | 467.5 | 8 |
| Roger François | Men's -75 kg | 70 | 80 | 87.5 | 87.5 | 117.5 | 442.5 | 6 |
| Alfred Louncke | Men's -82.5 kg | 70 | 90 | 85 | 95 | 120 | 460 | 10 |
| Maurice Martin | Men's -60 kg | 60 | 62.5 | 75 | 82.5 | 100 | 380 | 4 |
| Charles Rigoulot | Men's -82.5 kg | 87.5 | 92.5 | 85 | 102.5 | 135 | 502.5 | 1st place, gold medalist(s) |
| André Rolet | Men's -82.5 kg | 62.5 | 87.5 | 80 | 87.5 | 112.5 | 430 | 14 |
| Raymond Suvigny | Men's -60 kg | 50 | 65 | 70 | 80 | 100 | 365 | 10 |
| Léon Vandeputte | Men's -75 kg | 77.5 | 85 | X | 90 | 120 | 372.5 | 21 |
| Pierre Vibert | Men's -75 kg | 72.5 | 75 | 80 | 85 | 115 | 427.5 | 8 |

== Wrestling ==
=== Freestyle wrestling ===
Men's

| Athlete | Event | Round of 32 | Round of 16 | Quarterfinal | Semifinal | Final | |
| Athlete | Event | Opposition Result | Opposition Result | Opposition Result | Opposition Result | Opposition Result | Rank |
|---|---|---|---|---|---|---|---|
| J. Baillot | Light heavyweight | —N/a | Rumple (CAN); L | Did not advance | | | |
| Jules Bouquet | Bantamweight | —N/a | Bye | Larsson (SWE); L | Did not advance | | |
| Edmond Dame | Heavyweight | —N/a | Wernli (SUI); L | Did not advance | Bronze medal semifinal Retired | Did not advance | |
| Charles Delmas | Featherweight | Bye | Nilsson (SWE); W | Huupponen (FIN); L | Did not advance | | |
| Gaston Ducayla | Bantamweight | —N/a | Mäkinen (FIN); L | Did not advance | Bronze medal semifinal Sansum (GBR); W | Bronze medal final Hines (USA); L | 4 |
| R. Durr | Middleweight | —N/a | Penttilä (FIN); L | Did not advance | | | |
| Gaston Fichu | Welterweight | —N/a | Gehri (SUI); L | Did not advance | Silver medal semifinal Johnson (USA); L | Did not advance | |
| Maurice Guinard | Featherweight | Huupponen (FIN); L | Did not advance | | | | |
| Étienne Jourdain | Lightweight | —N/a | Pizzocaro (ITA); W | Wikström (FIN); L | Bronze medal semifinal Gardiner (GBR); L | Did not advance | |
| Gustave Kappeler | Light heavyweight | —N/a | del Genovese (ITA); L | Did not advance | | | |
| Émile Pouvroux | Lightweight | —N/a | Van Duyzen (BEL); W | Vis (USA); L | Silver medal semifinal Haavisto (FIN); L | Did not advance | |
| Marcel Dupraz | Welterweight | Roosen (BEL); L | Did not advance | | | | |

=== Greco-Roman ===
Men's

| Athlete | Event | First round | Second round | Third round | Fourth round | Fifth round | Sixth round | Seventh round | Eighth round | Rank |
| Athlete | Event | Opposition Result | Opposition Result | Opposition Result | Opposition Result | Opposition Result | Opposition Result | Opposition Result | Opposition Result | Rank |
|---|---|---|---|---|---|---|---|---|---|---|
| Georges Appruzèze | Bantamweight | Koolmann (EST); L | Ahlfors (FIN); L | Did not advance | | | | —N/a | | =17 |
| Justinien Baumert | Light heavyweight | Misset (NED); L | Moustafa (EGY); L | Did not advance | | | | | —N/a | =12 |
| Pierre Bonnefont | Light heavyweight | Dömény (HUN); L | Loo (EST); L | Did not advance | | | | | —N/a | =12 |
| Maurice Capron | Featherweight | Bottin (BEL); W | Porro (ITA); W | Naito (JPN); W | Malmberg (SWE); L | Nord (NOR); L | Did not advance | | | =6 |
| Émile Clody | Middleweight | Grandjean (SUI); W | Yalaz (TUR); L | Pštros (TCH); L | Did not advance | | | | —N/a | =15 |
| Edmond Dame | Heavyweight | Mileder (AUT); W | Bye | Badó (HUN); L | Rosenqvist (FIN); L | Did not advance | | —N/a | | =5 |
| Jean Deglane | Heavyweight | Hansen (DEN); W | Johansson (SWE); W | Szelky (HUN); W | Nilsson (SWE); W | Badó (HUN); W | Rosenqvist (FIN); W | —N/a | | 1st place, gold medalist(s) |
| Jean Domas | Middleweight | Reinderman (NED); L | Györgyei (HUN); W | Bye | Steinberg (EST); L | Did not advance | | | —N/a | =9 |
| T. Kueny | Bantamweight | Skopový (TCH); W | Slock (BEL); W | Olsen (NOR); L | Herschmann (AUT); L | Did not advance | | —N/a | | =9 |
| Georges Metayer | Lightweight | Kusnets (EST); L | Ranghieri (ITA); L | Did not advance | | | | —N/a | | =20 |
| Paul Parisel | Lightweight | Mollin (BEL); W | Matura (HUN); L | Sesta (AUT); L | Did not advance | | | —N/a | | =13 |
| René Rottenfluc | Featherweight | Käpp (EST); L | Svensson (SWE); L | Did not advance | | | | | | =18 |
