= Shooting at the 1924 Summer Olympics – Men's 100 meter running deer, double shots =

Sports shooting at the Olympics

Men's 100 meter running deer, double shots at the Games of the VIII Olympiad
- Venue: Le Stand de Tir de Versailles
- Dates: 1 July 1924
- Competitors: 31 from 8 nations

Medalists
1st place, gold medalist(s)		Ole Lilloe-Olsen	Norway
2nd place, silver medalist(s)		Cyril Mackworth-Praed	Great Britain
3rd place, bronze medalist(s)		Alfred Swahn	Sweden

The men's 100 meter running deer, double shots was a shooting sports event held as part of the Shooting at the 1924 Summer Olympics programme. It was the fourth appearance of the event. The competition was held on 1 July 1924 at the shooting ranges at Versailles. Thirty one shooters from eight nations competed.

== Results ==
A maximum of four competitors per nation were allowed. Every shooter fired ten times two shots ten times, with points from 0 to 5 (5 was the best). As such, a maximum of 100 points was possible.

Place	Shooter	Total	5 pts	4 pts	3 pts	2 pts	1 pt	0 pts	Shoot off
1	Ole Lilloe-Olsen (NOR)	76	5	8	6	-	1	-	
2	Cyril Mackworth-Praed (GBR)	72	4	8	6	1	-	1	22 pts
3	Alfred Swahn (SWE)	72	2	9	8	1	-	-	16 pts
4	Fredric Landelius (SWE)	70	1	11	7	-	-	1	
5	Einar Liberg (NOR)	70	3	7	8	1	1	-	
6	Toivo Tikkanen (FIN)	69	2	7	9	2	-	-	
7	John Boles (USA)	64	5	5	4	3	1	2	
7	Magnus Wegelius (FIN)	64	1	9	7	4	-	2	
9	Raymond Coulter (USA)	62	5	3	7	2	-	3	
9	Harald Natvig (NOR)	62	2	5	9	2	1	1	
9	Jalo Autonen (FIN)	62	3	3	11	1	-	2	
12	Walter Stokes (USA)	60	1	6	9	2	-	2	
13	Herbert Perry (GBR)	59	1	7	8	1	-	3	
13	Oluf Wesmann-Kjær (NOR)	59	1	8	6	2	-	3	
15	Martti Liuttula (FIN)	57	2	2	11	3	-	2	
15	Rudolf Jelen (TCH)	57	2	3	10	2	1	2	
15	Mauritz Johansson (SWE)	57	3	3	7	4	1	2	
18	Allen Whitty (GBR)	56	1	3	10	4	1	1	
19	Miloslav Hlaváč (TCH)	55	-	4	12	1	1	2	
20	Josef Sucharda (TCH)	53	2	3	8	3	1	3	
21	Marcel Adelon (FRA)	52	2	4	8	1	-	5	
22	Ted Ranken (GBR)	51	2	2	10	1	1	4	
22	André Chauvet (FRA)	51	-	4	6	8	1	1	
24	Dennis Fenton (USA)	49	2	4	5	4	-	5	
25	Elemér Takács (HUN)	42	1	2	9	-	2	6	
25	Jules Mahieu (FRA)	42	2	1	8	2	-	7	
27	Josef Hosa (TCH)	41	1	2	7	2	3	5	
28	Eugène Duflot (FRA)	40	-	1	10	2	2	5	
29	Gusztáv Szomjas (HUN)	28	1	-	4	5	1	9	
30	Karl-Gustaf Svensson (SWE)	25	1	1	3	3	1	11	
-	Rezső Velez (HUN)	DNF	-	-	-	1	-	1	
