= Shooting at the 1924 Summer Olympics – Men's 100 meter running deer, single shots =

Sports shooting at the Olympics

Men's 100 meter running deer, single shots at the Games of the VIII Olympiad
- Venue: Le Stand de Tir de Versailles
- Dates: 30 June 1924
- Competitors: 32 from 8 nations

Medalists
1st place, gold medalist(s)		John Boles	United States
2nd place, silver medalist(s)		Cyril Mackworth-Praed	Great Britain
3rd place, bronze medalist(s)		Otto Olsen	Norway

The men's 100 meter running deer, single shots was a shooting sports event held as part of the Shooting at the 1924 Summer Olympics programme. It was the fifth appearance of the event. The competition was held on 30 June 1924 at the shooting ranges at Versailles. 32 shooters from 8 nations competed.

== Results ==
A maximum of four competitors per nation were allowed. Every shooter fired 10 shots with points from 0 to 5 (5 was the best) so a maximum of 50 points was possible.

Place	Shooter	Total	5 pts	4 pts	3 pts	2 pts	1 pts	0 pts	Shoot off
1	John Boles (USA)	40	3	5	1	1	-	-	
2	Cyril Mackworth-Praed (GBR)	39	2	5	3	-	-	-	19 pts
3	Otto Olsen (NOR)	39	3	4	2	1	-	-	17 pts
4	Otto Hultberg (SWE)	39	4	2	3	1	-	-	
5	Martti Liuttula (FIN)	37	2	5	1	2	-	-	
6	Alfred Swahn (SWE)	37	2	3	5	-	-	-	
7	Einar Liberg (NOR)	36	-	6	4	-	-	-	
7	Harald Natvig (NOR)	36	2	2	6	-	-	-	
7	Mauritz Johansson (SWE)	36	2	2	6	-	-	-	
10	Rezső Velez (HUN)	35	2	2	5	1	-	-	
10	Walter Stokes (USA)	35	1	3	6	-	-	-	
12	Dennis Fenton (USA)	34	1	4	3	2	-	-	
12	Magnus Wegelius (FIN)	34	2	3	4	-	-	1	
12	Jalo Autonen (FIN)	34	-	5	4	1	-	-	
15	Ole Lilloe-Olsen (NOR)	33	2	2	3	3	-	-	
15	Toivo Tikkanen (FIN)	33	2	1	5	2	-	-	
17	Fredric Landelius (SWE)	32	1	3	3	3	-	-	
17	Miloslav Hlaváč (TCH)	32	-	5	3	1	1	-	
17	Raymond Coulter (USA)	32	-	2	8	-	-	-	
17	Jules Mahieu (FRA)	32	2	4	2	-	-	2	
21	John Faunthorpe (GBR)	31	3	2	2	1	-	2	
22	Ted Ranken (GBR)	30	-	3	4	3	-	-	
23	Marcel Adelon (FRA)	28	1	2	4	1	1	1	
24	Elemér Takács (HUN)	27	-	3	5	-	-	2	
24	Eugène Duflot (FRA)	27	-	2	5	2	-	1	
26	Alexander Rogers (GBR)	26	-	-	7	2	1	-	
26	André Chauvet (FRA)	26	1	-	6	1	1	1	
28	Gusztáv Szomjas (HUN)	24	-	-	7	1	1	1	
28	Rudolf Jelen (TCH)	24	1	1	4	-	3	1	
30	Josef Hosa (TCH)	21	-	2	3	1	2	2	
31	Sándor Lumniczer (HUN)	20	1	1	3	-	2	3	
31	Josef Sucharda (TCH)	20	-	2	3	-	3	2	
