= Shooting at the 1924 Summer Olympics – Men's 100 meter team running deer, double shots =

Sports shooting at the Olympics

Men's 100 meter team running deer, double shots at the Games of the VIII Olympiad
- Venue: Le Stand de Tir de Versailles
- Dates: 3 July 1924
- Competitors: 25 from 7 nations

Medalists
1st place, gold medalist(s)		Cyril Mackworth-Praed, Philip Neame, Herbert Perry, Allen Whitty; Great Britain
2nd place, silver medalist(s)		Einar Liberg, Ole Lilloe-Olsen, Harald Natvig, Otto Olsen; Norway
3rd place, bronze medalist(s)		Axel Ekblom, Mauritz Johansson, Fredric Landelius, Alfred Swahn; Sweden

The men's 100 meter team running deer, double shots was a shooting sports event held as part of the Shooting at the 1924 Summer Olympics programme. It was the third appearance of the event. The competition was held on 3 July 1924 at the shooting ranges at Versailles. 25 shooters from 7 nations competed.

== Results ==
Every shooter fired 10 times, two shots, with points from 0 to 5 (5 was the best) so a maximum of 100 points was possible. The scores of the four shooters on each team were summed to give a team score. No further shooting was done. The maximum score was 400.

Hungary was allowed to compete with an incomplete team; only one shooter participated.

The new Olympic champion in the individual competition Ole Lilloe-Olsen finished second with as part of the Norwegian team. British shooter Cyril Mackworth-Praed won this, his first gold medal, in a team event, having already won silver medals in two individual events.

Cyril Mackworth-Praed was able to score 76 rings as Ole Lilloe-Olsen did in the individual competition.

Place	Shooter	5 pts	4 pts	3 pts	2 pts	1 pts	0 pts	Total	Rank
1
1	Great Britain	14	19	33	8	2	4	263	
1	Cyril Mackworth-Praed	5	6	9	-	-	-	76	1
1	Allen Whitty	3	5	9	3	-	-	68	3
1	Herbert Perry	4	6	6	3	-	1	68	3
1	Philip Neame	2	2	9	2	2	3	51	20
2
2	Norway	10	24	34	7	-	5	262	
2	Ole Lilloe-Olsen	4	5	8	2	-	1	68	3
2	Otto Olsen	4	3	11	1	-	1	67	7
2	Harald Natvig	2	8	5	4	-	1	65	9
2	Einar Liberg	-	8	10	-	-	2	62	13
3
3	Sweden	8	29	27	6	1	9	250	
3	Alfred Swahn	2	11	5	-	-	2	69	2
3	Mauritz Johansson	2	10	5	1	1	1	68	3
3	Fredric Landelius	3	7	6	3	-	1	67	7
3	Axel Ekblom	1	1	11	2	-	5	46	23
4
4	Finland	8	16	39	9	-	8	239	
4	Magnus Wegelius	2	6	9	1	-	2	63	11
4	Jalo Autonen	2	3	12	2	-	1	62	13
4	Martti Liuttula	2	4	11	1	-	2	61	16
4	Toivo Tikkanen	2	3	7	5	-	3	53	18
5
5	United States	9	22	27	9	1	12	233	
5	Raymond Coulter	3	6	8	1	-	2	65	9
5	Walter Stokes	2	5	9	3	-	1	63	11
5	John Boles	1	9	5	3	-	2	62	13
5	Dennis Fenton	3	2	5	2	1	7	43	24
6
6	Czechoslovakia	4	11	39	7	9	10	204	
6	Miloslav Hlaváč	1	4	11	1	1	2	57	17
6	Josef Sucharda	1	-	14	3	-	2	53	18
6	Rudolf Jelen	2	3	7	-	4	4	47	21
6	Josef Hosa	-	4	7	3	4	2	47	21
–
–	Hungary	-	2	3	2	6	7	27	
–	Elemér Takács	-	2	3	2	6	7	27	25
