= Shooting at the 1924 Summer Olympics – Men's 100 meter team running deer, single shots =

Sports shooting at the Olympics

Men's 100 meter team running deer, single shots at the Games of the VIII Olympiad
- Venue: Le Stand de Tir de Versailles
- Dates: 2 July 1924
- Competitors: 25 from 7 nations

Medalists
1st place, gold medalist(s)		Einar Liberg, Ole Lilloe-Olsen, Harald Natvig, Otto Olsen; Norway
2nd place, silver medalist(s)		Otto Hultberg, Mauritz Johansson, Fredric Landelius, Alfred Swahn; Sweden
3rd place, bronze medalist(s)		John Boles, Raymond Coulter, Dennis Fenton, Walter Stokes; United States

The men's 100 meter team running deer, single shots was a shooting sports event held as part of the Shooting at the 1924 Summer Olympics programme. It was the fourth appearance of the event. The competition was held on 2 July 1924 at the shooting ranges at Versailles. 25 shooters from 7 nations competed.

== Results ==
Every shooter fired 10 shots with points from 0 to 5 (5 was the best) so a maximum of 50 points was possible. The scores of the four shooters on each team were summed to give a team score. No further shooting was done. The maximum score was 200.

Czechoslovakia was allowed to compete with an incomplete team; only one shooter participated.

The new Olympic champion in the individual competition John Boles finished third with the American team. While the bronze medalist from the individual competition Otto Olsen was able to win the gold medal with his Norwegian team.

Six shooters were able to score at least the same score of 40 rings like the winner of the individual event. The best shooter of the team contest Ole Lilloe-Olsen improved his performance from the individual event by 10 rings from 33 to 43.

Place	Shooter	5 pts	4 pts	3 pts	2 pts	1 pt	0 pts	Total	Rank
1
1	Norway	12	16	12	-	-	-	160	
1	Ole Lilloe-Olsen	4	5	1	-	-	-	43	1
1	Einar Liberg	5	2	3	-	-	-	42	2
1	Harald Natvig	2	4	4	-	-	-	38	8
1	Otto Olsen	1	5	4	-	-	-	37	11
2
2	Sweden	8	19	12	1	-	-	154	
2	Alfred Swahn	3	4	3	-	-	-	40	5
2	Fredric Landelius	2	5	3	-	-	-	39	7
2	Otto Hultberg	1	6	3	-	-	-	38	8
2	Mauritz Johansson	2	4	3	1	-	-	37	11
3
3	United States	7	17	13	3	-	-	148	
3	John Boles	3	5	2	-	-	-	41	3
3	Walter Stokes	1	6	3	-	-	-	38	8
3	Raymond Coulter	2	4	3	1	-	-	37	11
3	Dennis Fenton	1	2	5	2	-	-	32	16
4
4	Great Britain	8	9	18	3	-	2	136	
4	Cyril Mackworth-Praed	6	-	3	1	-	-	41	3
4	Alexander Rogers	1	2	5	2	-	-	32	16
4	John Faunthorpe	-	5	4	-	-	1	32	16
4	John O'Leary	1	2	6	-	-	1	31	19
5
5	Finland	7	10	15	5	-	3	130	
5	Magnus Wegelius	2	6	2	-	-	-	40	5
5	Martti Liuttula	3	2	3	2	-	-	36	14
5	Jalo Autonen	1	1	5	2	-	1	28	21
5	Toivo Tikkanen	1	1	5	1	-	2	26	22
6
6	Hungary	1	8	17	4	1	9	97	
6	Gusztáv Szomjas	-	4	4	1	-	1	30	20
6	Rezső Velez	-	1	5	2	-	2	23	23
6	Elemér Takács	1	2	3	-	1	3	23	23
6	László Szomjas	-	1	5	1	-	3	21	25
–
–	Czechoslovakia	1	2	6	1	-	-	33	
–	Miloslav Hlaváč	1	2	6	1	-	-	33	15
