= Shooting at the 1920 Summer Olympics – Men's 100 meter running deer, single shots =

Men's 100 meter running deer, single shots at the Games of the VII Olympiad
- Venue: Hoogboom Military Camp
- Date: 27 July 1920
- Competitors: 12 from 4 nations

Medalists
1st place, gold medalist(s)		Otto Olsen	Norway
2nd place, silver medalist(s)		Alfred Swahn	Sweden
3rd place, bronze medalist(s)		Harald Natvig	Norway

The 100 meter running deer, single shots was a shooting sports event held as part of the Shooting at the 1920 Summer Olympics programme. It was the third appearance for the event. The competition was held on 27 July 1920. 12 shooters from 4 nations competed.

== Results ==
Place	Shooter	Total	Shoot-off
1	Otto Olsen (NOR)	43	
2	Alfred Swahn (SWE)	41	20
3	Harald Natvig (NOR)	41	19
4	Yrjö Kolho (FIN)	40	
5	Toivo Tikkanen (FIN)	40	
6	Fredric Landelius (SWE)	39	
7	Lawrence Nuesslein (USA)	38	
8	Oscar Swahn (SWE)	37	
-	Willis A. Lee (USA)	33	
-	Thomas Brown (USA)	33	
-	Joseph Jackson (USA)	30	
-	Lloyd Spooner (USA)	30	
