= Mauritz Johansson =

Swedish sport shooter

Personal information
- Born: 19 March 1881 Bottnaryd, Sweden
- Died: 7 October 1966 (aged 85) Lidingö, Sweden

Sport
- Sport: Sports shooting
Medal record
Men's shooting
Representing Sweden
Olympic Games
Silver medal – second place	1924 Paris	team running deer, single shots
Bronze medal – third place	1924 Paris	team running deer, double shots

Gustav Mauritz Johansson-Fritzing (19 March 1881 – 7 October 1966) was a Swedish sport shooter who competed in the 1924 Summer Olympics.

In 1924 he won the silver medal as member of the Swedish team in the team running deer, single shots event and the bronze medal in the team running deer, double shots competition. In the 100 metre running deer, single shots event he finished seventh and in the 100 metre running deer, double shots competition he finished 15th.
