= Rowing at the 1924 Summer Olympics – Men's coxless four =

Men's coxless fours at the Games of the VIII Olympiad
- Venue: Seine
- Dates: 14–17 July 1924
- Competitors: 16 from 4 nations

Medalists
1st place, gold medalist(s)		Maxwell Eley, James MacNabb, Robert Morrison, Terence Sanders; Great Britain
2nd place, silver medalist(s)		Archibald Black, George MacKay, Colin Finlayson, William Wood; Canada
3rd place, bronze medalist(s)		Émile Albrecht, Alfred Probst, Eugen Sigg, Hans Walter; Switzerland

The men's coxless fours event was part of the rowing programme at the 1924 Summer Olympics. The competition, the third appearance of the event, was held from 14 to 17 July 1924 on the river Seine. Four teams, each from a different nation, competed, with Great Britain winning the gold medal.

== Results ==
=== Semifinals ===
The top two boats in each semifinal advanced to the final, meaning no teams were eliminated.

Semifinal 1
Place	Rowers		Time	Qual.
1	Maxwell Eley (GBR); James MacNabb (GBR)	Robert Morrison (GBR); Terence Sanders (GBR)	6:43.0	Q
2	Théo Cremnitz (FRA); Jean Camuset (FRA)	Albert Bonzano (FRA); Henri Bonzano (FRA)		Q
Semifinal 2
Place	Rowers		Time	Qual.
1	Archibald Black (CAN); George MacKay (CAN)	Colin Finlayson (CAN); William Wood (CAN)	6:31.0	Q
2	Émile Albrecht (SUI); Alfred Probst (SUI)	Eugen Sigg (SUI); Hans Walter (SUI)		Q

=== Final ===
Final
Place	Rowers		Time
1st place, gold medalist(s)	Maxwell Eley (GBR); James MacNabb (GBR)	Robert Morrison (GBR); Terence Sanders (GBR)	7:08.6
2nd place, silver medalist(s)	Archibald Black (CAN); George MacKay (CAN)	Colin Finlayson (CAN); William Wood (CAN)	7:18.0
3rd place, bronze medalist(s)	Émile Albrecht (SUI); Alfred Probst (SUI)	Eugen Sigg (SUI); Hans Walter (SUI)	
4	Théo Cremnitz (FRA); Jean Camuset (FRA)	Albert Bonzano (FRA); Henri Bonzano (FRA)	

== Sources ==
- Wudarski, Pawel (1999). "Wyniki Igrzysk Olimpijskich" (in Polish).
