= Édouard Belet =

Swiss wrestler

- Born: 1893
- Died: 11 January 1988 (aged 94)

Édouard Belet (1893 – 11 January 1988) was a Swiss wrestler. He competed in the freestyle lightweight event at the 1924 Summer Olympics.
