= Wrestling at the 1924 Summer Olympics – Men's freestyle welterweight =

Men's welterweight freestyle wrestling at the Games of the VIII Olympiad
- Venue: Vélodrome d'Hiver
- Dates: July 11–14, 1924
- Competitors: 13 from 7 nations

Medalists
1st place, gold medalist(s)		Hermann Gehri	Switzerland
2nd place, silver medalist(s)		Eino Leino	Finland
3rd place, bronze medalist(s)		Otto Müller	Switzerland

The men's freestyle welterweight was a freestyle wrestling event held as part of the Wrestling at the 1924 Summer Olympics programme. It was the second appearance of the event. Welterweight was the middle category, including wrestlers weighing from 66 to 72 kilograms.

== Results ==
Source: Official results; Wudarski

=== Gold medal round ===
Round of 16
Guy Lookabaugh (USA)	W
Otto Müller (SUI)	L
John Davis (GBR)	W
Fridolf Lundsten (FIN)	L
Eino Leino (FIN)	W
Frits Janssens (BEL)	L
Hyacinthe Roosen (BEL)	W
Marcel Dupraz (FRA)	L
Hermann Gehri (SUI)	W
G. Fichu (FRA)	L

Quarterfinals
Donald Stockton (CAN)	W
Edgar Bacon (GBR)	L
Guy Lookabough (USA)	W
John Davis (GBR)	L
Eino Leino (FIN)	W
Hyacinthe Roosen (BEL)	L
Hermann Gehri (SUI)	W
William Johnson (USA)	L

Semifinals
Donald Stockton (CAN)	L
Guy Lookabough (USA)	W
Eino Leino (FIN)	L
Hermann Gehri (SUI)	W

Final
Guy Lookabough (USA)	L
Hermann Gehri (SUI)	W

=== Silver medal round ===
Semifinals		Final
Eino Leino (FIN)	W
Guy Lookabough (USA)	L	Eino Leino (FIN)	W
William Johnson (USA)	W	William Johnson (USA)	L
G. Fichu (FRA)	L

=== Bronze medal round ===
Semifinals		Final
William Johnson (USA)	W
John Davis (GBR)	L	William Johnson (USA)	L
Otto Müller (SUI)	W	Otto Müller (SUI)	W
Donald Stockton (CAN)	L
