= 100 m running moose =

Shooting sport fired at a moving moose target at a distance of 100 meters

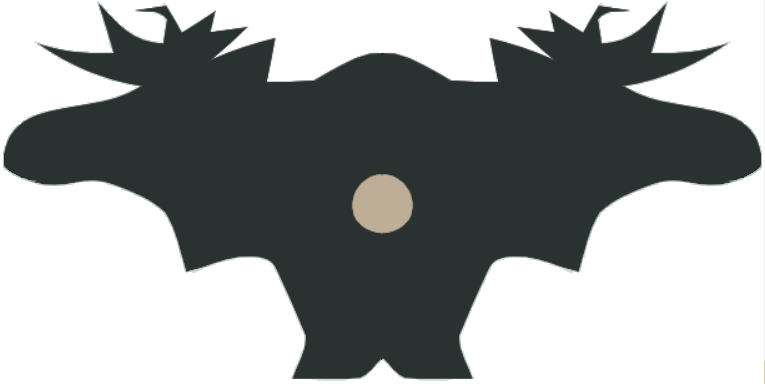
Sketch of a running moose target.

100 meter running moose (Norwegian elgbaneskyting, Swedish älgbaneskytte, Finnish hirviammunta) is a shooting sport based on running targets simulating a moose moving sideways.

The sport is popular in Norway, Sweden and Finland, with competitions being arranged by the Norwegian Association of Hunters and Anglers, Svenska Jägareförbundet and Finnish Hunters' Association, respectively. Events are most commonly shot at 100 meters, but sometimes 80 meters instead (particularly in Sweden). The use of electronic targets is common, but cardboard targets are also sometimes used.

== History ==
In the 1950s, many shooting ranges in Norway had already been set up for training on running moose targets, but it was first introduced as a competition in the 1960s by the Norwegian Association of Hunters and Anglers. Interest increased steadily, and in the 1980s over 130 shooting ranges across Norway were set up for running moose. In Hordaland and Sogn og Fjordane in Western Norway, it was for long common to change the running moose targets with one of a running deer with the same hit zones and points, since there is little moose and a lot of red deer in those regions. Nowadays, most ranges have changed to standard moose targets.

== Program ==
A match consists of 20 fired rounds. The first 10 rounds are shot at a static target, while the last 10 rounds are fired at a moving target. Both the static and running target have an inner hit zone, denoted with a star (*), used to distinguish the best shooters.

Value	Circle diameter	Angular size	
Value	Circle diameter	mrad	MOA
5* points (inner hit)	150 mm	1.5 mrad	5.2 moa
5 points	250 mm	2.5 mrad	8.6 moa
4 points	350 mm	3.5 mrad	12 moa
3 points	450 mm	4.5 mrad	15.5 moa
0 points	Outside the 3 ring		

=== Static target ===
The 5 first rounds at the static target are fired from a seated position, which is to be completed during a 2 minute string. The next 5 rounds are fired at the same target, but from a standing position, also within a 2 minute string.

The static target stage has available a maximum of 50 points with 10 inside hits, called "50-10", and this forms a basis before the running target shooting event.

=== Running target ===
The moving target string consists of 10 rounds. The target moves sideways with a velocity of approximately 5 m/s (18 km/h; 11 mph), appearing from cover and disappearing after each pass. The target can only be engaged with one round for each of its ten passes. With the visible opening being around 20-25 meters wide, this means that the moose is visible for around 4-5 seconds during each pass.

The moving target stage has available a maximum of 50 points with 10 inside hits, called "50-10".

=== Combined score ===
The combined maximum points for a match is 100 points with 20 inside hits, called "100-20".

== Equipment ==
Competitors are divided into several classes based on equipment, age and previous accomplishments.

=== Nordic Championship rules ===
In the Nordic championships, there is only one equipment class, and competitors are divided into the classes senior, D2, E1, E2 and F. Here the minimum bullet diameter is 6.5 mm (i.e. 6.5x55 mm or 6.5x47 mm), the minimum trigger pull is 1 kg, and the rifle can weigh maximum 5.5 kg.

=== National Norwegian rules ===
Competitions in Norway (except Nordic championships) divide competitors into the following set of classes:

- Sporter (A, B, D2, E1, E2 and F)
- Hunter or jeger (JC, JB og JA)
- Younger junior or yngre junior (D1)

Sporter class

The sporter class has no maximum weight for the rifle, and it is common to use heavy "sporter rifles". The minimum trigger pull weight i 1 kg. The smallest permitted cartridge is .222 Rem (since 1 January 2015, formerly the minimum bullet diameter was 6.5 mm). Some of the most commonly seen cartridges in competitions are .223 Remington, 6.5×55 mm, .308 Win and .30-06. Scopes can be chosen freely, regardless of magnification.

Hunter class

The hunter class (jegerklassen) was originally aimed at typical hunting rifle setups, but today most compete with special built competition rifles. There is a maximum weight of 5 kg for the rifle, and scope sights can have a 12x maximum magnification. As with the sporter class, the minimum trigger pull is 1 kg, and the smallest permitted cartridge i .222 Rem. The cartridges most commonly seen in competitions are the same as for the sporter class.

Younger junior

Younger junior (yngre junior) permits any cartridge, and it is common to see participants shooting .22 LR, .223 Remington, 6.5×55 mm, .308 Win or .30-06. As for the other classes, the minimum trigger pull weight is 1 kg. There is no weight limit on the firearm, and scope sights can be chosen freely.

== See also ==
- 50 m running target (running boar)
- 100 m running deer
- Moose biathlon
