= Alfred Swahn =

Swedish sport shooter

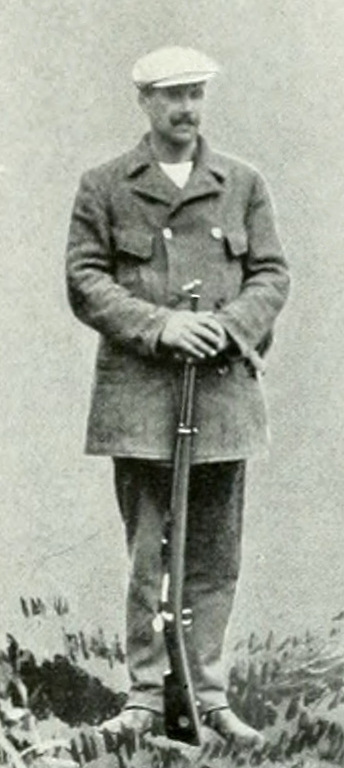
- Alfred Swahn at the 1912 Olympics

Personal information
- Nickname: Alf
- Nationality: Swedish
- Born: 20 August 1879 Uddevalla, Sweden
- Died: 16 March 1931 (aged 51) Stockholm, Sweden

Sport
- Country: Sweden
- Sport: Sports shooting
- Club: Stockholms SkarpSF; Djursholms-Danderyds SF; FOK, Stockholm
Medal record
Representing Sweden
Olympic Games
Gold medal – first place	1908 London	Team running deer, single shots
Gold medal – first place	1912 Stockholm	running deer, single shots
Gold medal – first place	1912 Stockholm	Team running deer, single shots
Silver medal – second place	1920 Antwerp	Running deer, single shots
Silver medal – second place	1920 Antwerp	Team running deer, double shots
Silver medal – second place	1924 Paris	Team running deer, single shots
Bronze medal – third place	1920 Antwerp	Team trap
Bronze medal – third place	1924 Paris	Running deer, double shots
Bronze medal – third place	1924 Paris	Team running deer, double shots

Alfred (Alf) Gomer Swahn (20 August 1879 – 16 March 1931) was a Swedish sport shooter who competed at the 1908, 1912, 1920 and 1924 Summer Olympics. He won nine medals: three gold, three silver and three bronze. He is the son of Oscar Swahn, an Olympic shooter who competed alongside his son at the 1908, 1912 and 1920 Olympics and won six medals.

1908 London

In 1908, Swahn was a member of the Swedish team, which won the gold medal in the team running deer, single shots competition. He also participated in the individual trap event and finished 25th.

1912 Stockholm

At the 1912 Summer Olympics, he won two gold medals in running deer, single shots event. One in the individual and one in the team competition. He also participated in the following events:

- running deer, double shots – fourth place
- team trap – fourth place
- trap – 21st place

1920 Antwerp

In 1920, he won two silver medals and one bronze medal. He also participated in the following events:

- team running deer, single shots – fourth place
- running deer, double shots – fourth place
- trap – result unknown

1924 Paris

In 1924, he won one silver and two bronze medals. He also participated in the following events:

- team trap – fifth place
- running deer, single shots – sixth place

== See also ==
- List of multiple Olympic medalists
