= Otto Hultberg =

Swedish sport shooter (1877–1954)

Personal information
- Born: 24 November 1877 Kågeröd, Sweden
- Died: 24 November 1954 (aged 77) Gothenburg, Sweden

Sport
- Sport: Sports shooting
Medal record
Men's shooting
Representing Sweden
Olympic Games
Silver medal – second place	1924 Paris	team running deer, single shots

Otto F. Hultberg (14 November 1877 – 24 November 1954) was a Swedish sport shooter who competed in the 1924 Summer Olympics.

In 1924 he won the silver medal as member of the Swedish team in the team running deer, single shots competition. In the 100 metre running deer, single shots event he finished fourth.
