= Walter Montgomery (wrestler) =

Canadian wrestler

- Born: November 8, 1895; Pembroke, Ontario, Canada
- Died: October 10, 1950 (aged 54); Pembroke, Ontario, Canada

Walter Montgomery (November 8, 1895 – October 10, 1950) was a Canadian wrestler. He competed in the freestyle lightweight event at the 1924 Summer Olympics.
