= Bienna Pélégry =

French swimmer

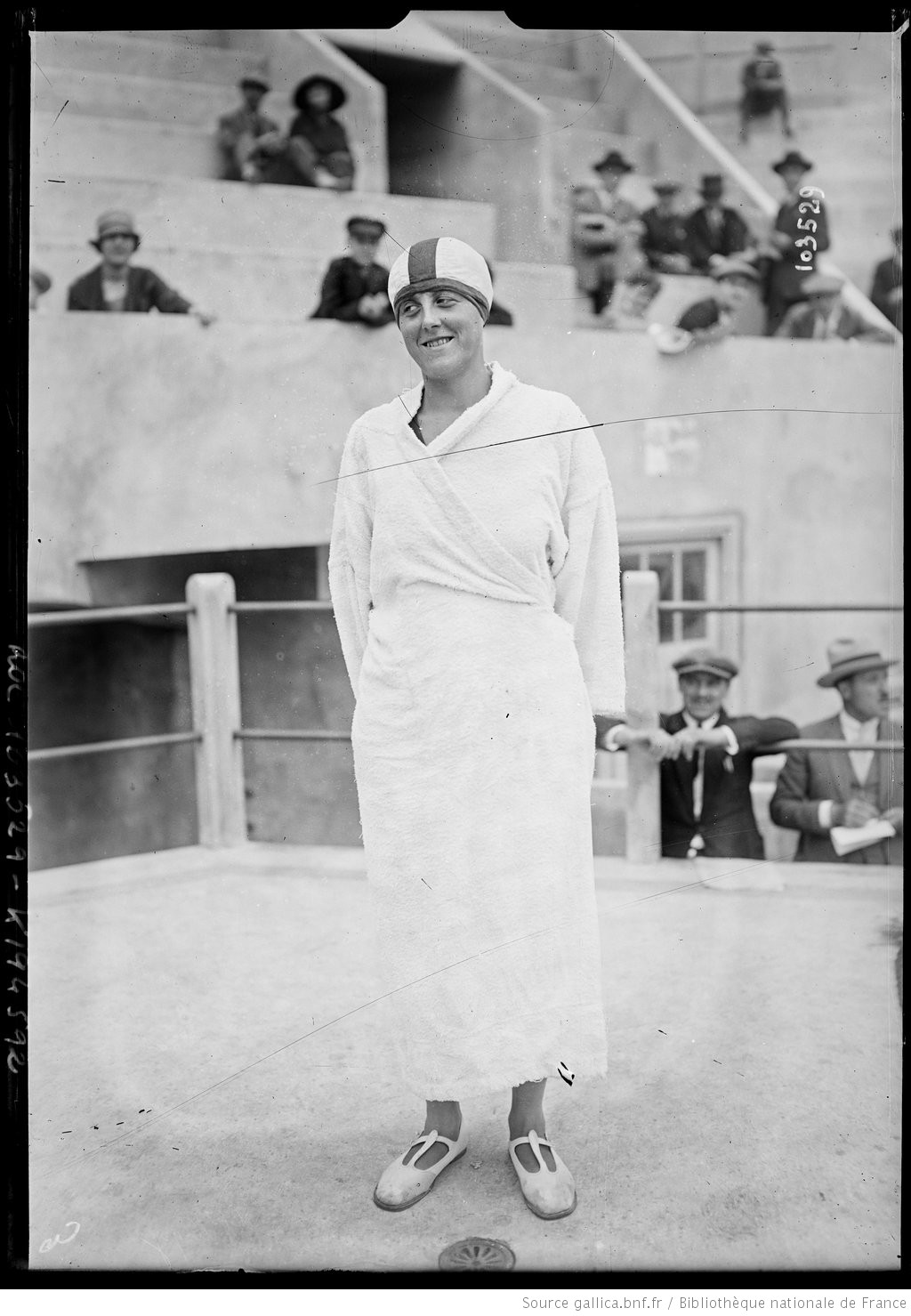
- Born: Erecthée Bibiena Mélanie Marie Pélégry; 24 August 1899
- Died: 18 January 1989 (aged 89)
- Other names: Bienna Boiteux
- Children: Jean Boiteux
- Relatives: Salvator Pélégry (brother)
- Sports career
- National team: France
- Sport: Swimming
- Strokes: freestyle

Erecthée Bibiena Mélanie Marie "Bienna" Pélégry, later Boiteux (24 August 1899 – 18 January 1989), was a French freestyle swimmer who competed in the 1924 Summer Olympics and in the 1928 Summer Olympics. She was the sister of Salvator Pélégry and the mother of Jean Boiteux. In 1924 she was a member of the French relay team which finished fifth in the 4 × 100 metre freestyle relay competition. Four years later she finished again fifth with the French relay team in the 4 × 100 metre freestyle relay event at the Amsterdam Games.
