= Wrestling at the 1924 Summer Olympics – Men's freestyle lightweight =

Men's lightweight freestyle wrestling at the Games of the VIII Olympiad
- Venue: Vélodrome d'Hiver
- Dates: July 11–14, 1924
- Competitors: 16 from 10 nations

Medalists
1st place, gold medalist(s)		Russell Vis	United States
2nd place, silver medalist(s)		Volmar Wikström	Finland
3rd place, bronze medalist(s)		Arvo Haavisto	Finland

The men's freestyle lightweight was a freestyle wrestling event held as part of the Wrestling at the 1924 Summer Olympics programme. It was the fourth appearance of the event. Lightweight was the third-lightest category, including wrestlers weighing from 61 to 66 kilograms.

== Results ==
Source: Official results; Wudarski

Round of 16
Russell Vis (USA)	W
Walter Montgomery (CAN)	L
Émile Pouvroux (FRA)	W
Herman Van Duyzen (BEL)	L
Arvo Haavisto (FIN)	W
Auguste Corti (SUI)	L
Alfred Praks (EST)	W
Perry Martter (USA)	L
Volmar Wikström (FIN)	W
Søren Eriksen (DEN)	L
Étienne Jourdain (FRA)	W
Riccardo Pizzocaro (ITA)	L
George Gardiner (GBR)	W
Osvald Käpp (EST)	L
Édouard Belet (SUI)	W
Ernest Bacon (GBR)	L

Quarterfinals
Russell Vis (USA)	W
Émile Pouvroux (FRA)	L
Arvo Haavisto (FIN)	W
Alfred Praks (EST)	L
Volmar Wikström (FIN)	W
Étienne Jourdain (FRA)	L
George Gardiner (GBR)	W
Édouard Belet (SUI)	L

Semifinals
Russell Vis (USA)	W
Arvo Haavisto (FIN)	L
Volmar Wikström (FIN)	W
George Gardiner (GBR)	L

Final
Russell Vis (USA)	W
Volmar Wikström (FIN)	L

=== Silver medal round ===
Semifinals		Final
Arvo Haavisto (FIN)	W
Émile Pouvroux (FRA)	L	Arvo Haavisto (FIN)	L
Volmar Wikström (FIN)	W	Volmar Wikström (FIN)	W
Walter Montgomery (CAN)	L

=== Bronze medal round ===
Semifinals		Final
Arvo Haavisto (FIN)	W
Søren Eriksen (DEN)	L	Arvo Haavisto (FIN)	W
George Gardiner (GBR)	W	George Gardiner (GBR)	L
Étienne Jourdain (FRA)	L
