= Otto Müller (wrestler) =

Swiss freestyle wrestler

- Born: 21 June 1899
- Died: unknown
Medal record
Men's freestyle wrestling
Representing Switzerland
Olympic Games
Bronze medal – third place	1924 Paris	Welterweight

Otto Müller (born 21 June 1899, date of death unknown) was a Swiss freestyle wrestler and Olympic medalist. He received a bronze medal at the 1924 Summer Olympics in Paris.
