= Cyril Mackworth-Praed =

British sport shooter

Personal information
- Born: 21 September 1891 Dorking, England
- Died: 30 June 1974 (aged 82) Ringwood, Hampshire, England

Sport
- Sport: Sports shooting
Medal record
Men's shooting
Representing United Kingdom
Olympic Games
Gold medal – first place	1924 Paris	Team running deer, double shots
Silver medal – second place	1924 Paris	running deer, single shots
Silver medal – second place	1924 Paris	running deer, double shots

Cyril Winthrop Mackworth-Praed OBE (21 September 1891 – 30 June 1974) was a British sport shooter who competed in the 1924 Summer Olympics. He was also a naturalist and ornithologist who specialized on the birds of Africa.

== Life and work ==
Mackworth-Praed was born to Robert Herbert and Mary Josephine Jolliffe, in Herefordshire where he became interested in shooting and natural history which was also encouraged at school in Sandroyd. After studying at Eton College and Trinity College, Cambridge, he settled in East Africa as a farmer. In 1919 he married, Edith Mary Henrietta, the daughter of Stephenson Robert Clarke and began to help identify African birds in his father-in-law's collection. This brought him to the bird room of the British Museum. He later joined the Scots Guards and served in both the First and Second World War, in the latter becoming Commanding Officer of the Commando Training School, rising to the rank of Major in 1941. He returned to live in Castletop, Burley, Hampshire. In the 1930s he began a collaboration with Claude H. B. Grant to produce a 6 volume work on the birds of Africa. In 1958, Grant died and only two volumes were produced. The remainder, completed in 1973, was written by Mackworth-Praed.

He had a parallel career as a sport shooter. In 1924 he won the gold medal as member of the British team in the team running deer, double shots event. He also won two silver medals in the running deer, single shots and double shots competition. In the 1924 Summer Olympics he also participated in the following events:

- Team 100 metre running deer, single shots - fourth place
- Team clay pigeons - eighth place
- individual trap - result unknown

He also competed at the 1952 Summer Olympics.

He was appointed OBE in 1964.
