= Herbert Perry (sport shooter) =

British sport shooter (1894–1966)

Personal information
- Born: 23 January 1894
- Died: 20 July 1966 (aged 72) Dorset, England

Sport
- Sport: Sports shooting
Medal record
Men's shooting
Representing United Kingdom
Olympic Games
Gold medal – first place	1924 Paris	Team running deer, double shots

Herbert Spencer Perry (23 January 1894 – 20 July 1966) was a British sport shooter who competed in the 1924 Summer Olympics. In 1924, he won the gold medal as member of the British team in the team running deer, double shots event.

In the individual running deer, double shots competition he finished 13th. He was educated at Felsted School.
