= Auguste Corti =

Swiss wrestler

- Born: 1901

Auguste Corti (1901 – 9 November 1958) was a Swiss wrestler. He competed in the freestyle lightweight event at the 1924 Summer Olympics.
