= William Wood (rower) =

Canadian rower (1899–1969)

Olympic medal record

Men's rowing
Silver medal – second place	1924 Paris	Coxless four

William Wood (January 6, 1899 – October 2, 1969) was a Canadian rower who competed in the 1924 Summer Olympics. In 1924, he won the silver medal as crew member of the Canadian boat in the coxless fours event.
