= Guy Lookabaugh =

American sportsperson, coach, and administrator (1896–1981)

Biographical details
- Born: May 26, 1896; Watonga, Oklahoma, U.S.
- Died: September 10, 1981 (aged 85); Tahlequah, Oklahoma, U.S.

Playing career

Football
- 1917: Oklahoma A&M
- 1919: Oklahoma A&M
- 1924: Oklahoma A&M

Coaching career (HC unless noted)

Football
- 1923: Cameron
- 1927: Kansas (backfield)
- 1928: Ardmore HS (OK)
- 1929–1935: Northeastern State
- 1936–1939: Grinnell

Basketball
- 1929–1934: Northeastern State

Wrestling
- c. 1927: Kansas

Administrative career (AD unless noted)
- 1929–1936: Northeastern State

Head coaching record
- Overall: 30–61–4 (college football); 17–62 (college basketball)

Guy "Ducky" Lookabaugh (May 26, 1896 – September 10, 1981) was an American football player, wrestler, and coach of football, basketball, and wrestling, and college athletics administrator. He competed in the freestyle welterweight event at the 1924 Summer Olympics.

Lookabaugh served as the head football coach at Northeastern State Teachers College—now known as Northeastern State University—in Tahlequah, Oklahoma from 1929 to 1935 and at Grinnell College in Grinnell, Iowa from 1936 to 1939. He was also the head basketball coach at Northeastern State from 1929 to 1934. Lookabaugh played college football at Oklahoma Agricultural and Mechanical College—now known as Oklahoma State University–Stillwater. He was an assistant football coach and head wrestling coach at the University of Kansas in the late 1920s.

He graduated from Oklahoma A&M in 1925 with a Bachelor of Science degree in physical education. He later earned a master's degree in physical education from the University of Iowa. In 1940, Lookabaugh was appointed Oklahoma's state supervisor of community service for the Works Projects Administration (WPA).

== Head coaching record ==
=== College football ===
Year	Team	Overall	Conference	Standing
Northeastern State Redmen (Oklahoma Collegiate Conference) (1929–1935)
1929	Northeastern State	2–6	0–5	6th
1930	Northeastern State	4–5	1–4	5th
1931	Northeastern State	2–9	0–5	6th
1932	Northeastern State	1–7	0–5	6th
1933	Northeastern State	3–3–1	3–2	3rd
1934	Northeastern State	4–5	3–2	T–2nd
1935	Northeastern State	4–3–1	2–2–1	T–3rd
Northeastern State:		20–38–2	9–25–1	
Grinnell Pioneers (Missouri Valley Conference) (1936–1939)
1936	Grinnell	2–7	0–3	7th
1937	Grinnell	2–6–1	1–3	T–6th
1938	Grinnell	3–5	0–3	T–5th
Grinnell Pioneers (Midwest Collegiate Athletic Conference) (1939)
1939	Grinnell	3–5–1	2–3	8th
Grinnell:		10–23–2	3–12	
Total:		30–61–4		
