= Eino Leino (wrestler) =

Finnish wrestler (1891–1986)

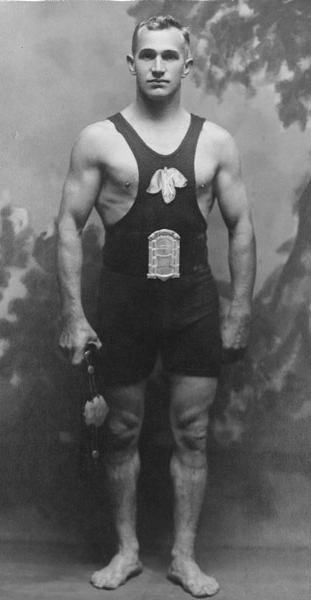

Personal information
- Born: 7 April 1891 Kuopio, Grand Duchy of Finland, Russian Empire
- Died: 30 November 1986 (aged 95) Tampere, Finland
- Height: 174 cm (5 ft 9 in)
- Weight: 66–76 kg (146–168 lb)

Sport
- Sport: Freestyle wrestling
- Club: NYAC, New York
Medal record
Men's freestyle wrestling
Representing Finland
Olympic Games
Gold medal – first place	1920 Antwerp	Middleweight
Silver medal – second place	1924 Paris	Welterweight
Bronze medal – third place	1928 Amsterdam	Lightweight
Bronze medal – third place	1932 Los Angeles	Welterweight

Eino Aukusti Leino (7 April 1891 – 30 November 1986) was a Finnish freestyle wrestler. He competed at the 1920, 1924, 1928 and 1932 Olympics and won a medal each time, including a gold in 1920.

Leino started as a diver and association football goalkeeper before changing to wrestling. In late 1914 he immigrated to the United States, and therefore did not compete at Finnish, European and world championships until 1930s, when he returned to Finland. He won the American AAU Championships in 1920 and 1923 and placed second in Finnish championships in 1936. Leino was a carpenter by profession, and later in 1949–52 also worked as a sports functionary in Finland.
