= Colin Finlayson =

Canadian rower

Olympic medal record

Men's rowing
Silver medal – second place	1924 Paris	Coxless four

Colin Herbert Bain Finlayson (January 24, 1903 – March 11, 1955) was a Canadian rower who competed in the 1924 Summer Olympics. In 1924 he won the silver medal as crew member of the Canadian boat in the coxless fours event. He died in Kemano, British Columbia.

The IOC medal database credits this medal to A. Mariacher. Also the official report shows Mariacher as competitor instead of Finlayson. The National Olympic Committee of Canada, however, shows only Finlayson as competitor, but not Mariacher. Also other contemporary sources give Finlayson instead of Mariarcher.
