= Walter Stokes =

American sport shooter

Personal information
- Born: 23 May 1898 Mohawk, Florida, United States
- Died: 9 June 1996 (aged 98) Stuart, Florida, United States

Sport
- Sport: Sports shooting
Medal record
Men's shooting
Representing the United States
Olympic Games
Gold medal – first place	1924 Paris	Team free rifle
Bronze medal – third place	1924 Paris	Team running deer, single shots

Walter Raymond Stokes (May 23, 1898 – June 9, 1996) was an American sport shooter who competed in the 1924 Summer Olympics.

== Life ==
He was born on May 23, 1898, in Mohawk, Florida.

In 1924, he won the gold medal as member of the American team in the team free rifle event, and the bronze medal in the team running deer, single shots, competition. At the 1924 Summer Olympics, he also participated in the following events:

- 600 metre free rifle - fourth place
- Team running deer, double shots - fifth place
- running deer, single shots - tenth place
- 50 metre rifle, prone - tenth place
- running deer, double shots - twelfth place

He died on June 9, 1996, in Stuart, Florida.
