= George MacKay (rower) =

Canadian rower (1900–1972)

Olympic medal record

Men's rowing
Silver medal – second place	1924 Paris	Coxless four

George Findlay MacKay (July 11, 1900 – August 23, 1972) was a Canadian rower who competed in the 1924 Summer Olympics. He was born in Vancouver and died in Miami-Dade County, Florida, United States. In 1924 he won the silver medal as crew member of the Canadian boat in the coxless fours event.

He was inducted into the BC Sports Hall of Fame in 1977.
