= Raymond Coulter =

American sport shooter

Personal information
- Born: April 12, 1897 Hadley, Illinois, United States
- Died: January 23, 1965 (aged 67) Mount Sterling, Illinois, United States

Sport
- Sport: Sports shooting
Medal record
Men's shooting
Representing United States
Olympic Games
Gold medal – first place	1924 Paris	Team free rifle
Bronze medal – third place	1924 Paris	Team running deer, single shots

Raymond Orville Coulter (April 12, 1897 – January 23, 1965) was an American sport shooter who competed in the 1924 Summer Olympics.

He was born Hadley, Illinois.

In 1924 he won the gold medal as member of the American team in the team free rifle event and the bronze medal in the team running deer, single shots competition. In the 1924 Summer Olympics he also participated in the following events:

- Team running deer, double shots - fifth place
- running deer, double shots - ninth place
- running deer, single shots - 17th place
