= Fredric Landelius =

Swedish sport shooter

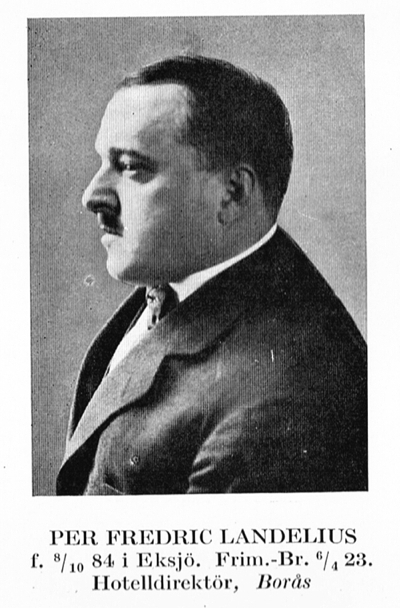

Personal information
- Born: Per Fredric Landelius; 8 October 1884 Eksjö, Sweden
- Died: 2 September 1931 (aged 46) Borås, Sweden

Sport
- Sport: Sports shooting
Medal record
Men's shooting
Representing Sweden
Olympic Games
Silver medal – second place	1920 Antwerp	running deer, double shots
Silver medal – second place	1920 Antwerp	team running deer, double shots
Silver medal – second place	1924 Paris	team running deer, single shots
Bronze medal – third place	1920 Antwerp	team clay pigeons
Bronze medal – third place	1924 Paris	team running deer, double shots

P. Fredric Landelius (8 October 1884 – 2 September 1931) was a Swedish sport shooter who competed in the 1920 Summer Olympics and in the 1924 Summer Olympics.

In 1920 he won two silver and one bronze medal as member of the Swedish team. He also participated in the individual running deer, single shots and he finished sixth, in the individual trap his result is unknown.

Four years later, he won the silver medal as member of the Swedish team in running deer, single shots event and the bronze medal in running deer, double shots competition.

In the 1924 Summer Olympics he also participated in the following events:

- 100 metre running deer, double shots - fourth place
- Team clay pigeons - fifth place
- individual trap - 14th place
- 100 metre running deer, single shots - 17th place
