= John Davis (wrestler) =

British wrestler

Personal information
- Born: 21 May 1893
- Died: Unknown

John William Davis (born 21 May 1893, date of death unknown) was a British wrestler. He competed in the freestyle welterweight event at the 1924 Summer Olympics.
