= Martti Liuttula =

Finnish sport shooter

Personal information
- Born: 12 January 1894 Sääksmäki, Finland
- Died: 17 November 1979 (aged 85) Helsinki, Finland

Sport
- Sport: Sports shooting

Martti Johannes Liuttula (12 January 1894 – 17 November 1979) was a Finnish sport shooter who competed in the 1924 Summer Olympics.

In the 1924 Summer Olympics he participated in the following events:

- Team 100 metre running deer, double shots – fourth place
- 100 metre running deer, single shots – fifth place
- Team 100 metre running deer, single shots – fifth place
- 100 metre running deer, double shots – 15th place
