= 100 meter running deer =

Sport shooting event

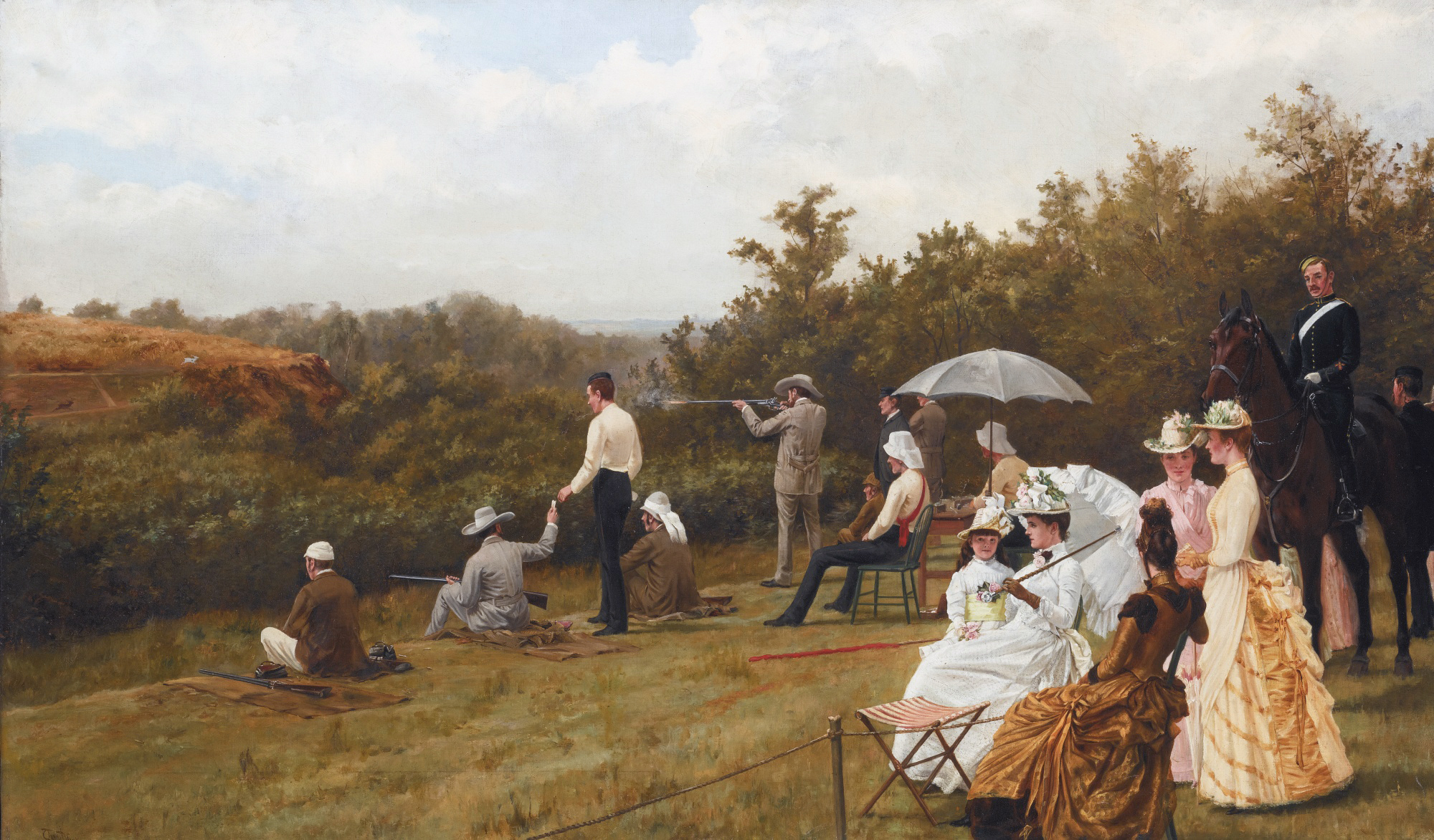
The American shooter Walter Winans during a 100-meter running deer competition in Wimbledon Common, London (painting by Thomas Blinks, 1888)

100 meter running deer is a discontinued ISSF shooting event, that was part of the Olympic program from 1908 to 1924, in 1952 and 1956, and of the ISSF World Shooting Championships program from 1929 to 1962, when it was replaced by 50 meter running target. Being the original running target event, it was shot with centerfire rifles from a distance of 100 meters, with the target moving sideways across a 20-meter-wide opening. There were two versions: single shot and double shot. Occasionally combined competitions, with half the course fired single-shot and half double-shot, were held instead of or in addition to the others. The Nordic Shooting Region continued to hold championships in the discipline until 2004. The British Sporting Rifle Club continues to operate a 100 meter running deer range at the National Shooting Centre, Bisley.

== History ==
=== In the Olympics ===
1908 was the first time of running deer at the Olympics, and the target was specified to placed at 110 yards (100.584 meters) and made 10 runs of 75 feet (23 meters) for about 4 seconds each. The deer target had a scoring area of three concentric circles, with the smallest counting for 4 points, the middle for 3, and the outermost for 2. A hit outside the circles but still on the target (except on the haunch) counted for 1 point. The target made 10 runs for each shooter both in the Single- and Double-Shot event, and in the Team event each team consisted of four shooters. Thus the individual double-shot event a maximum of 80 points per shooter, the Individual Single-Shot event had a maximum 40 points per shooter, and the Team Single-Shot event had a maximum of (4·40 =) 160 points per team.

In the 1912 event the target had been changed to have 5 scoring areas, with 5 point for inner scoring area. The target distance was now specified as 100 meters. Each shooter still got 10 runs, and thus the maximum possible points thus became maximum 100 points for Individual Double-Shot, 50 for Individual Single-Shot and 200 for Team Single-Shot respectively. 20 shooters from 6 nations competed in the Individual Double-Shot event, 20 shooters from 5 nations competed in the Team Single-Shot event, and 34 sport shooters from 7 nations competed in the Team Single-Shot event.

In 1920 the events were held on 27 July. 8 shooters from 3 nations competed in the Individual Double-Shot event, while 12 shooters from 4 nations competed in the Individual Single-Shot event. This championship saw the introduction of the Team Double-Shot event, now in addition to the Team Single-Shot event. 20 shooters from four nations competed in both these events.

In 1924 the events were held from 30 June to 3 July at the shooting range in Le Stand de Tir de Versailles in Versailles, France. The number, types and format of the events was similar as in the 1920 Olympics. First out was the Individual Single-Shot event in 30 June where 32 shooters from 8 nations competed. The day after on 1 July the Individual Double-Shot event was held, with 31 shooters from 8 nations. The last two days consisted of the Team events. Team Single-Shot was held on 2 July with 25 shooters from 7 nations. Notably, Czechoslovakia was allowed to compete with an incomplete team; only one shooter participated. Lastly the Team Double-Shot event was held on 3 July, with 25 shooters from 7 nations. Notably Hungary was allowed to compete with an incomplete team; only one shooter participated. Running deer events would not be held again at the Olympics until 1952, meaning that the event was not included in the 1928, 1932, 1936 and 1948 Summer Olympics. 1924 would also be the last time of format with separate Single- and Double-Shot events, as well as any Team events.

In the 1952 Olympics in Helsinki, Finland, running deer was again on the Olympic program, but this time in the new format of the Individual Combined Single- and Double-Shot event only. The competition was held on 28 and 29 July, and 14 shooters from 7 nations competed. The winner, John Larsen from Norway, scored 413 points.

In the 1956 Summer Olympics in Melbourne, Australia was again arranged in the format of an Individual Combined Single- and Double-Shot event on 3 and 4 December. 11 shooters from 6 nations competed. The winner, Vitali Romanenko from Ukrainia and competing for the Soviet Union, scored 441 points. This was the last time running deer was arranged as a part of the Olympics.

== Men's Running Deer at the Summer Olympics ==
- 1908: Individual Double-Shot and Single-Shot, as well as Team Single-Shot
- 1912: Individual Double-Shot and Single-Shot, as well as Team Single-Shot
- 1920: Individual Double-Shot and Single-Shot, as well as Team Double-Shot and Team Single-Shot
- 1924: Individual Double-Shot and Single-Shot, as well as Team Double-Shot and Team Single-Shot
- 1952: Individual Combined Single- and Double-Shot
- 1956: Individual Combined Single- and Double-Shot

== See also ==
- ISSF 50 meter running target and running target mixed (also known as 50 meter running boar)
- ISSF 10 meter running target and running target mixed
- 100 meter running moose, a popular competition in Scandinavia oriented towards hunters. The distance is usually 100 meters, but sometimes 80 meters instead.
