= Marcel Dupraz =

French wrestler

- Born: 2 January 1897

Marcel Dupraz (born 2 January 1897, date of death unknown) was a French wrestler. He competed in the freestyle welterweight event at the 1924 Summer Olympics.
