= Théo Cremnitz =

French rower

Théodore Cremnitz
Personal information
- Full name: Théodore Salmon Cremnitz
- Nationality: French
- Born: 13 July 1899; Paris, France
- Died: 3 November 1980 (aged 81); Val-de-Marne, France

Sport
- Sport: Rowing

Théodore Salmon Cremnitz (13 July 1889 – 3 November 1980) was a French rower. He competed in the men's coxless four event at the 1924 Summer Olympics.
