= Jean Camuset =

French rower

Personal information
- Nationality: French
- Born: 1893
- Died: Unknown

Sport
- Sport: Rowing

Jean Camuset (born 1893, date of death unknown) was a French rower. He competed in the men's coxless four event at the 1924 Summer Olympics.
