= William Johnson (wrestler) =

American wrestler (1901–1928)

Personal information
- Born: January 19, 1901 Brownwood, Texas, U.S.
- Died: May 27, 1928 (aged 27) Flushing, New York, U.S.

Sport
- Country: United States
- Sport: Wrestling
- Events: Freestyle and Folkstyle
- College team: Columbia
- Team: USA

William Johnson (January 19, 1901 – May 27, 1928) was an American wrestler. He competed in the freestyle welterweight event at the 1924 Summer Olympics. He attended Columbia University, where he captained the wrestling team and played on the football team. Johnson graduated in 1922 and made the USA Olympic wrestling team in 1924. He worked in the railway supply business for Ross F. Hayes in Manhattan. When only 27 years old, Johnson became ill and died less than a month later in 1928.
