= Hermann Gehri =

Swiss wrestler (1899–1979)

- Born: 26 July 1899
- Died: 25 November 1979 (aged 80)
Medal record
Men's freestyle wrestling
Representing Switzerland
Olympic Games
Gold medal – first place	1924 Paris	Welterweight

Hermann Gehri (26 July 1899 – 25 November 1979) was a Swiss freestyle wrestler and Olympic champion. He received a gold medal at the 1924 Summer Olympics in Paris.
