= Riccardo Pizzocaro =

Italian wrestler

- Born: 26 March 1901; Milan, Italy

Riccardo Pizzocaro (26 March 1901 – 17 July 1992) was an Italian wrestler. He competed in the freestyle lightweight event at the 1924 Summer Olympics. He died in 1992.
