= Herman Van Duyzen =

Belgian wrestler

- Born: 1902

Herman Van Duyzen (born 1902, date of death unknown) was a Belgian wrestler. He competed in the freestyle lightweight event at the 1924 Summer Olympics.
