= Émile Pouvroux =

French wrestler

- Born: 1901

Émile Pouvroux (16 January 1901 – 25 July 1988) was a French wrestler. He competed in the freestyle lightweight event at the 1924 Summer Olympics.
