= Allen Whitty =

British sport shooter

Personal information
- Born: 5 May 1867 Martley, Worcestershire, England
- Died: 22 July 1949 (aged 82) Aldermaston, Berkshire, England

Sport
- Sport: Sports shooting
Medal record
Men's shooting
Representing United Kingdom
Olympic Games
Gold medal – first place	1924 Paris	Team running deer, double shots

Lieutenant-Colonel Allen Whitty, DSO (5 May 1867 – 22 July 1949) was a British Army officer and sport shooter who competed in the 1924 Summer Olympics representing Great Britain.

== Biography ==
Whitty joined the Worcestershire Regiment aged only 13 by concealing his age, and soon saw service in British India where he developed his skills as a marksman. He returned home as a regimental sergeant major in 1897. After the outbreak of the Second Boer War in late 1899, several regiments of the army were augmented to increase the overall number of available soldiers. Whitty was commissioned a quartermaster with the honorary rank of lieutenant in the new 3rd battalion of his regiment on 17 March 1900. He was later gazetted to a commission in his county regiment in June 1916, and later that year was awarded the Distinguished Service Order (DSO) and promoted to lieutenant colonel.

Whitty was a well-known figure at Army and national rifle meetings. He was a member of the Army VIII at various times between 1897 and 1920 and he shot in the King's Hundred five times, the last being in 1938 as a 71-year-old. At the 1924 Olympics, Whitty only competed in the running deer, double shot, events, and after finishing in 18th place individually, he won a gold medal as a member of the team that defeated Norway by single point.
