= Georges Paulus =

French swimmer

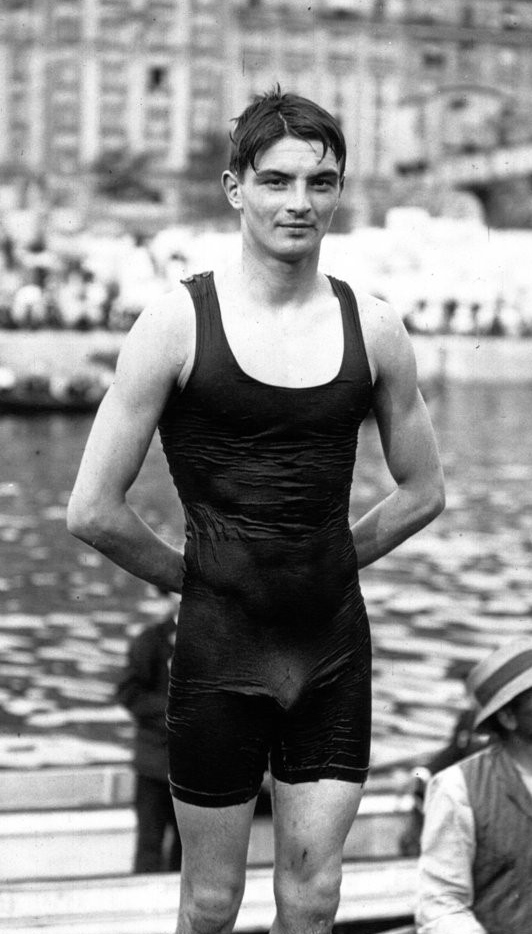
- René Paulus in 1911

Personal information
- Born: 30 January 1896
- Died: 5 July 1937 (aged 41)

Sport
- Sport: Swimming
- Club: CN Paris

Georges Paulus (30 January 1896 – 5 July 1937) was a French swimmer. He competed at the 1924 Summer Olympics in the 100 m backstroke event, but failed to reach the final.
