= Russell Vis =

American wrestler (1900–1990)

Personal information
- Born: June 22, 1900 Grand Rapids, Michigan, U.S.
- Died: April 1, 1990 (aged 89) San Diego, California, U.S.
- Home town: Portland, Oregon, U.S.
Medal record
Men's freestyle wrestling
Representing the United States
Olympic Games
Gold medal – first place	1924 Paris	66 kg

Russell John Vis (June 22, 1900 – April 1, 1990) was an American amateur and professional wrestler. He spent his youth in Portland, Oregon, where he started wrestling with the same instructor who taught the legendary wrestler Robin Reed. Before the Olympics, Vis was an AAU national champion. He competed at the 1924 Olympic Games in Paris, where he received a gold medal in the freestyle lightweight division. Vis then wrestled professionally as a welterweight for three years, but quickly grew tired of the professional circuit and retired in 1930. In 1977, Vis was inducted into the National Wrestling Hall of Fame as a Distinguished Member.
