= Robert Liottel =

French fencer (1885–1968)

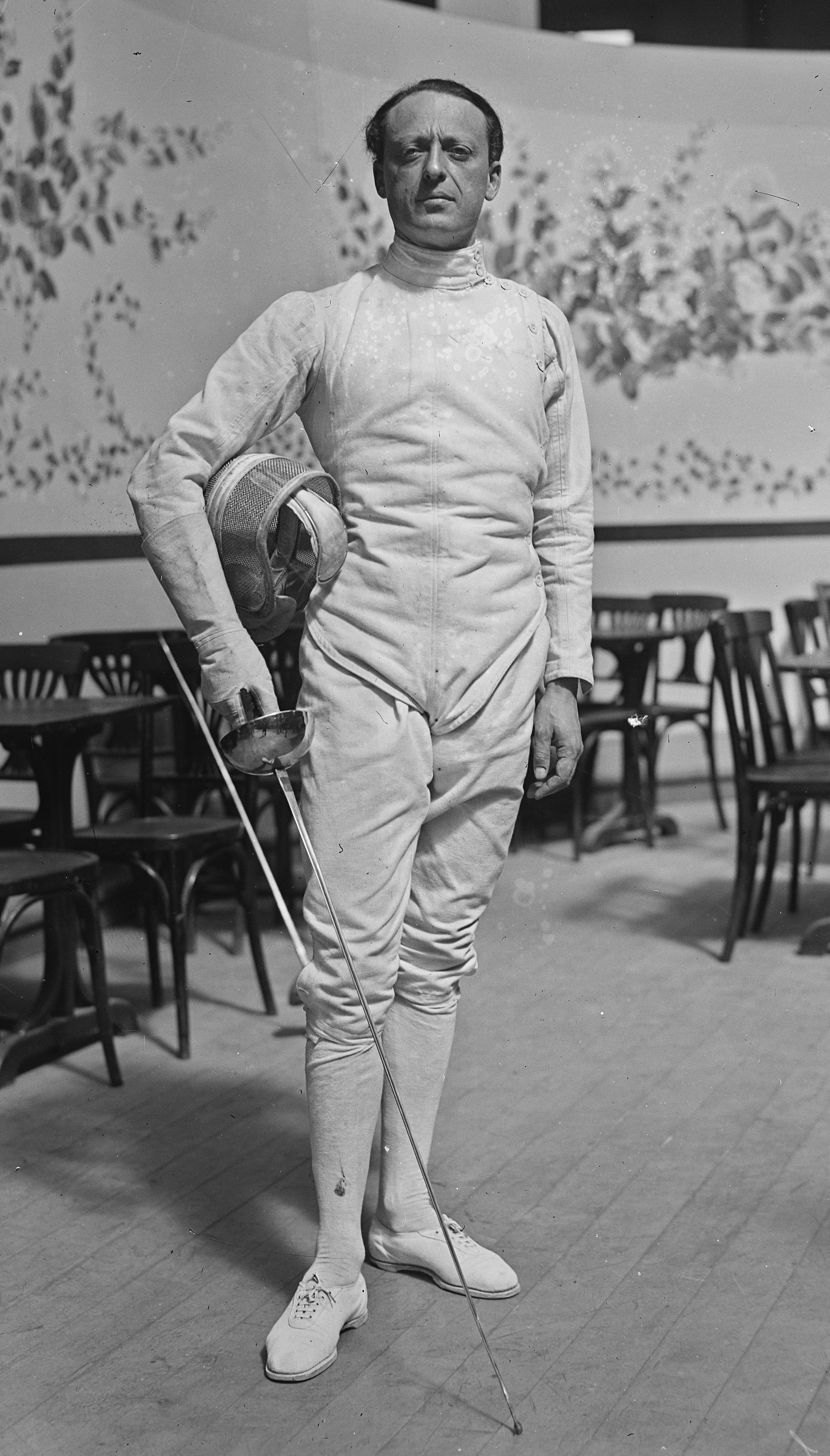
- Robert Liottel at the 1922 European Championships

Personal information
- Born: 23 September 1885 Romilly-sur-Seine, Aube, France
- Died: 23 April 1968 (aged 82) Druye, Indre-et-Loire, France

Sport
- Sport: Fencing
- Club: Cercle de l'Union des Armes de Paris
Medal record
Representing France
Olympic Games
Gold medal – first place	1924 Paris	Team épée

Robert Gustave Édouard Liottel (23 September 1885 – 23 April 1968) was a French fencer. He won a gold medal in the team épée competition at the 1924 Olympic Games.
