= Ole Lilloe-Olsen =

Norwegian sport shooter (1863–1940)

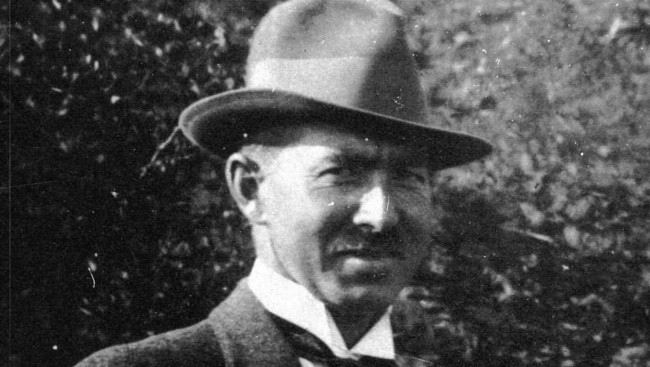

Personal information
- Born: 27 April 1883 Oslo, Norway
- Died: 29 April 1940 (aged 57) Oslo, Norway

Sport
- Sport: Sport shooting
Medal record
Men's shooting
Representing Norway
Olympic Games
Gold medal – first place	1920 Antwerp	100 m running deer, double shots
Gold medal – first place	1920 Antwerp	team 100 m running deer, single shots
Gold medal – first place	1920 Antwerp	team 100 m running deer, double shots
Gold medal – first place	1924 Paris	100 m running deer, double shots
Gold medal – first place	1924 Paris	team 100 m running deer, single shots
Silver medal – second place	1924 Paris	team 100 m running deer, double shots

Ole Andreas Lilloe-Olsen (27 April 1883 – 29 April 1940) was a Norwegian rifle shooter who competed in the early 20th century in rifle shooting. With his five gold medals and one silver medal, he is the Norwegian athlete with the most medals at the Summer Olympics. He participated in shooting at the 1920 Summer Olympics in Antwerp and won the gold medal in 100 m running deer, double shots and team 100 m running deer, single shots and team 100 m running deer, double shots. At the 1924 Summer Olympics in Paris, he defended the Olympic titles in 100 m running deer, double shots and team 100 m running deer, single shots and the silver medal in team 100 m running deer, double shots.

== See also ==
- List of multiple Olympic gold medalists
