= Georges Vallerey =

French swimmer

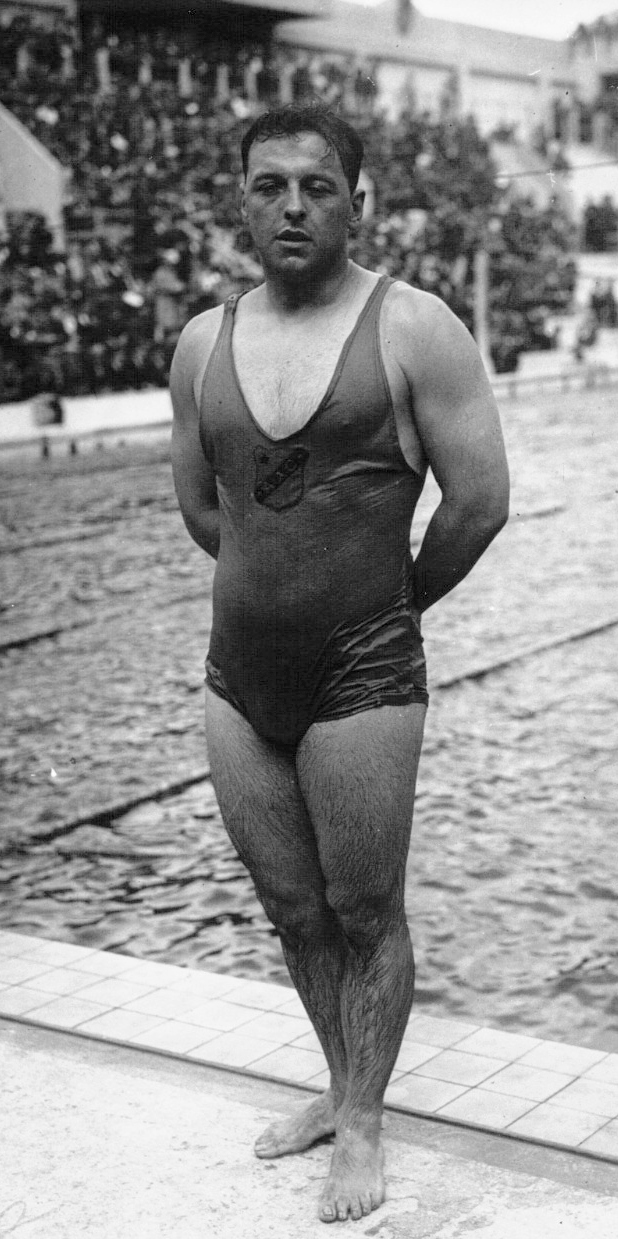
- Georges Vallerey in 1927

Personal information
- Born: 2 December 1902 Lorient, France
- Died: 11 June 1956 (aged 53) Casablanca, Morocco

Sport
- Sport: Swimming
- Club: Amiens AC

Georges Émile Pierre Jehan Denis Vallerey Sr. (2 December 1902 – 11 June 1956) was a French swimmer. He competed at the 1924 Summer Olympics in the 200 m breaststroke event, but failed to reach the final. His son Georges Vallerey Jr. and daughter Gisèle Vallerey also became Olympic swimmers.
