= Étienne Jourdain =

French wrestler

- Born: 12 April 1897
- Died: 22 May 1964 (aged 67)

Étienne Jourdain (12 April 1897 – 22 May 1964) was a French wrestler. He competed in the freestyle lightweight event at the 1924 Summer Olympics.
