= George Gardiner (wrestler) =

British wrestler

- Born: 15 July 1900; Stirling, Scotland
- Died: 11 September 1924 (aged 24); Stirling, Scotland

George Gardiner (15 July 1900 – 11 September 1924) was a British wrestler. He competed in the freestyle lightweight event at the 1924 Summer Olympics.
