= Salvator Pélégry =

French swimmer

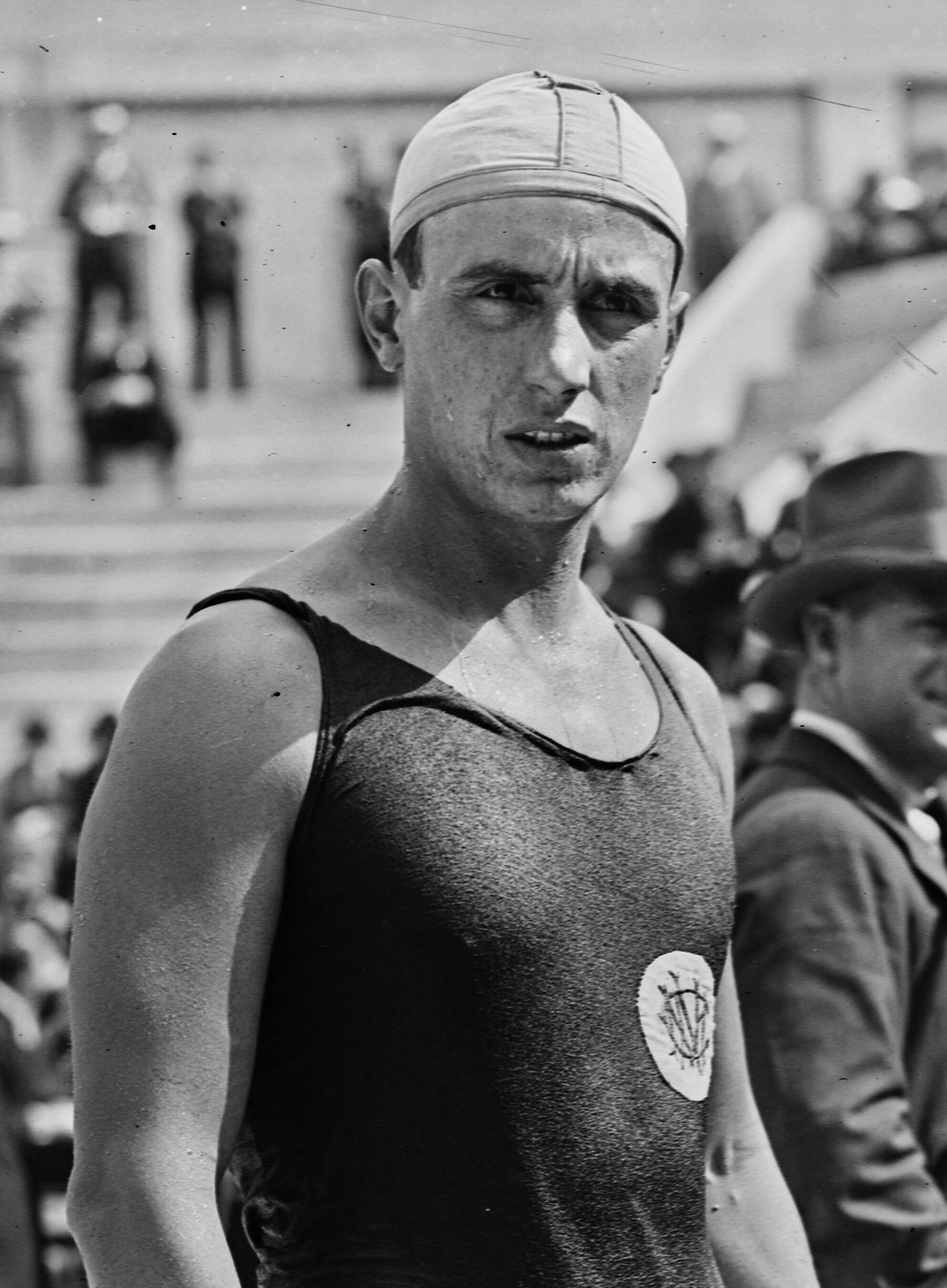
- Salvator Pélégry in 1924

Personal information
- Born: 25 March 1898 Sanary-sur-Mer, France
- Died: 16 February 1965 (aged 66) Sanary-sur-Mer, France

Sport
- Sport: Swimming

Salvator Pélégry (25 March 1898 – 16 February 1965) was a French swimmer. He competed in two events at the 1924 Summer Olympics.
