= John Boles (sport shooter) =

American sport shooter

Personal information
- Born: January 31, 1888 Fort Smith, Arkansas, United States
- Died: July 16, 1952 (aged 64) San Antonio, Texas, United States

Sport
- Sport: Sport shooting
Medal record
Men's shooting
Representing United States
Olympic Games
Gold medal – first place	1924 Paris	Running deer, single shot
Bronze medal – third place	1924 Paris	Running deer, single shot, team

John Keith Boles (January 31, 1888 – July 16, 1952) was an American sport shooter who competed in the 1924 Summer Olympics in Paris, where he won one individual gold medal (Running Deer) and one bronze medal as a member of the US team (Running Deer, Team).

He was born in Fort Smith, Arkansas.
