= Jules Mahieu =

French sports shooter

Personal information
- Born: 23 April 1884 Ghyvelde, France
- Died: 7 February 1962 (aged 77)

Sport
- Sport: Sports shooting

Jules Mahieu (23 April 1884 – 7 February 1962) was a French sports shooter. He competed in two events at the 1924 Summer Olympics.
