= Eugène Duflot =

French sports shooter

Personal information
- Born: 9 May 1885 Fontaine-lès-Vervins, France
- Died: 11 March 1957 (aged 71) Fontaine-lès-Vervins, France

Sport
- Sport: Sports shooting

Eugène Duflot (French: [ø.ʒɛn dy.flo]; 9 May 1885 – 11 March 1957) was a French sports shooter. He competed in two events at the 1924 Summer Olympics.
