= Rezső Velez =

Hungarian sports shooter

Personal information
- Born: 31 August 1887 Komárom, Austria-Hungary
- Died: 15 May 1971 (aged 83) Budapest, Hungary

Sport
- Sport: Sports shooting

Rezső Velez (31 August 1887 – 15 May 1971) was a Hungarian sports shooter. He competed in four events at the 1912 Summer Olympics and seven events at the 1924 Summer Olympics.
