= Josef Hoša =

Czech sports shooter

Personal information
- Born: 30 November 1882
- Died: Unknown

Sport
- Sport: Sports shooting

Josef Hoša (born 30 November 1882) was a Czechoslovak sports shooter. He competed in three events at the 1924 Summer Olympics.
