= Marcel Adelon =

French sports shooter

Personal information
- Born: 20 February 1886 Paris, France
- Died: 30 October 1968 (aged 82) Saint-Jean-de-Luz, France

Sport
- Sport: Sports shooting

Marcel Adelon (20 February 1886 – 30 October 1968) was a French sports shooter. He competed in two events at the 1924 Summer Olympics.
