= André Chauvet =

French sports shooter

Personal information
- Born: 1878
- Died: Unknown

Sport
- Sport: Sports shooting

André Chauvet (born 1878, date of death unknown) was a French sports shooter. He competed in two events at the 1924 Summer Olympics.
