= Harald Natvig =

Norwegian sport shooter (1872–1947)

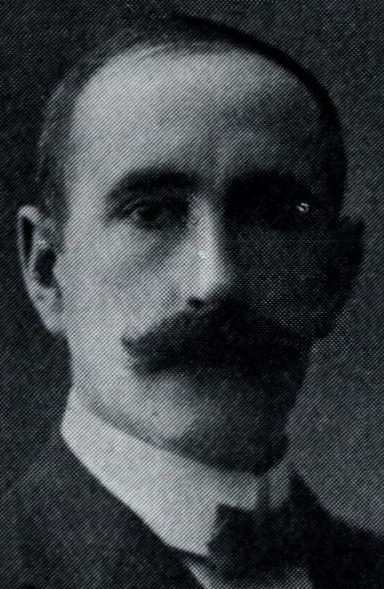
- Natvig, photograph from 1911 book

Personal information
- Born: 10 June 1872 Stavanger, Norway
- Died: 1 August 1947 (aged 75) Hjerkinn, Norway

Sport
- Sport: Sports shooting
Medal record
Men's shooting
Representing Norway
Olympic Games
Gold medal – first place	1920 Antwerp	team 100 m running deer, single shots
Gold medal – first place	1920 Antwerp	team 100 m running deer, double shots
Gold medal – first place	1924 Paris	team 100 m running deer, single shots
Silver medal – second place	1924 Paris	team 100 m running deer, double shots
Bronze medal – third place	1920 Antwerp	100 m running deer, single shots

Harald Natvig (10 June 1872 – 1 August 1947) was a Norwegian physician and a sport shooter, who won three gold medals in the 1920 and 1924 Summer Olympics.

== Life ==
Natvig graduated in 1898 and worked as a municipal doctor in Lyngør, Kristiansund, and Flakstad. From 1905, Natvig ran his own medical practice in Bergen, and from 1908 in Oslo. During the 1912–1913 First Balkan War, he worked as a surgeon in a Serbian field hospital. In the 1918 Finnish Civil War, Natvig led a Norwegian Red Cross ambulance on the White side. In late 1918, Natvig published a book of his photographs on the Finnish Civil War. Especially those taken in the Battle of Länkipohja have become famous.

== Sports career ==
He competed in the shooting event at the 1920 Summer Olympics in Antwerp and won the gold medals in both the team 100 meter running deer, single shots and team 100 meter running deer, double shots. He also won the individual bronze medal in 100 meter running deer, single shot. At the 1924 Summer Olympics in Paris, he won the gold medal in the team 100 meter running deer, single shots, and the silver medal in the team 100 meter running deer, double shots.

== War photographer ==
Natvig's images of the Finnish Civil War featured in his book Fra den finske frihedskrig 1918: Vestarméen, which he published in late 1918. Following the Battle of Länkipohja, Natvig also took a series of photographs of the execution of 13 surrendered Red Guard fighters, who were found hiding in a basement and shot on 17 March. A series of images showing the Red Guard fighters being executed, including one showing them being hit by bullets, are some of the best-known images of the Finnish Civil War.

== Bibliography ==
- Fra den finske frihedskrig 1918: Vestarméen, Kristiania: Mittet & Co. Kunstforlag, 1918.
