= Elemér Takács =

Hungarian sports shooter

Personal information
- Born: 1889
- Died: Unknown

Sport
- Sport: Sports shooting

Elemér Takács (born 1889, date of death unknown) was a Hungarian sports shooter. He competed in eight events at the 1924 Summer Olympics.
