= Miloslav Hlaváč =

Czech sports shooter

Personal information
- Born: 1893
- Died: 9 June 1975 (aged 81–82)

Sport
- Sport: Sports shooting

Miloslav Hlaváč (1893 – 9 June 1975) was a Czechoslovak sports shooter. He competed in four events at the 1924 Summer Olympics.
