= Le Stand de Tir de Versailles =

Firing range in Versailles, France

Coordinates: 48.8022°N 2.1139°E

Le Stand de Tir de Versailles (English: Versailles Shooting Stand) is a firing range located in Versailles, France in the Le Parc des Sports de Versailles (English: Versailles Sports Park). For the 1924 Summer Olympics in neighboring Paris, it hosted all of the sport shooting events except trap shooting which took place at Issy-les-Moulineaux, and the shooting portion of the modern pentathlon.
