= Oregon State Beavers =

Intercollegiate sports teams of Oregon State University

- University: Oregon State University
- Nickname: Beavers
- NCAA: Division I (FBS)
- Conference: Pac-12
- Athletic director: Kevin Griffin
- Location: Corvallis, Oregon
- Varsity teams: 17 (7 men's, 10 women's)
- Football stadium: Reser Stadium; Providence Park
- Basketball arena: Gill Coliseum
- Baseball stadium: Goss Stadium at Coleman Field
- Softball stadium: Kelly Field
- Soccer stadium: Paul Lorenz Field at Patrick Wayne Valley Stadium
- Other venues: Avery Park; OSU Boathouse; Trysting Tree Golf Club; Whyte Track and Field Center
- Colors: Orange and black
- Mascot: Benny Beaver
- Fight song: Hail to Old OSU
- Website: osubeavers.com

The Oregon State Beavers are the athletic teams that represent Oregon State University, located in Corvallis, Oregon. The Beavers compete at the National Collegiate Athletic Association (NCAA) Division I (Football Bowl Subdivision (FBS) for college football) level as a member of the Pac-12 Conference (Pac-12). Oregon State's mascot is Benny the Beaver. Both the men's and women's teams share the name, competing in 7 NCAA Division I men's sports and 9 NCAA Division I women's sports respectively. The official colors for the athletics department are Beaver Orange (Pantone 1665), black, and white.

The primary rivals of the Beavers are the Oregon Ducks of the University of Oregon, located 45 miles (72 km) south of the Oregon State campus in Eugene, Oregon. The football rivalry between the Beavers and Ducks, once known as the Civil War, was one of the longest-running in the country, having been contested 127 times through the 2023 season. Other regional rivals include the Washington Huskies and Washington State Cougars, having played each 108 times in football through the 2023 season.

As of February 2025, the Beavers have won one pre-NCAA team national championship and four NCAA team national championships. The 1926 wrestling team won the Amateur Athletic Union national championship, the 1961 men's Cross-country team won the NCAA title, and most recently the baseball team won the 2006, 2007 and 2018 College World Series. Other notable performances include a second-place finish in the 1973 and 1995 NCAA wrestling finals, two Final Four appearances by the men's basketball team, one Final Four appearance by the women's basketball team, the football team defeating Notre Dame by a 32-point margin in the 2001 Fiesta Bowl (and finishing the season ranked #4 in the polls), eight appearances in the College World Series by the baseball program, reaching the College Cup of the 2023 NCAA Division I men's soccer tournament, and several individual NCAA championship titles in gymnastics, wrestling, and track & field.

On September 12, 2024, Oregon State will be one of the founding members of the new Pac-12 Conference on July 1, 2026.

== Sports teams ==
Men's sports	Women's sports
Baseball	Basketball
Basketball	Cross Country
Football	Golf
Golf	Gymnastics
Rowing	Rowing
Soccer	Soccer
Wrestling	Softball
	Track & Field^{†}
	Volleyball
† – Track and field includes both indoor and outdoor.

=== Men's sports ===
Oregon State has four NCAA championships: three in baseball (2006, 2007 and 2018), and one in men's cross country (1961). The school dropped its cross country and track programs in 1988 due to budget cuts, though women's track and cross country were reinstated in 2005. Periodically, some men continue to compete individually in an unattached status.

==== Baseball ====
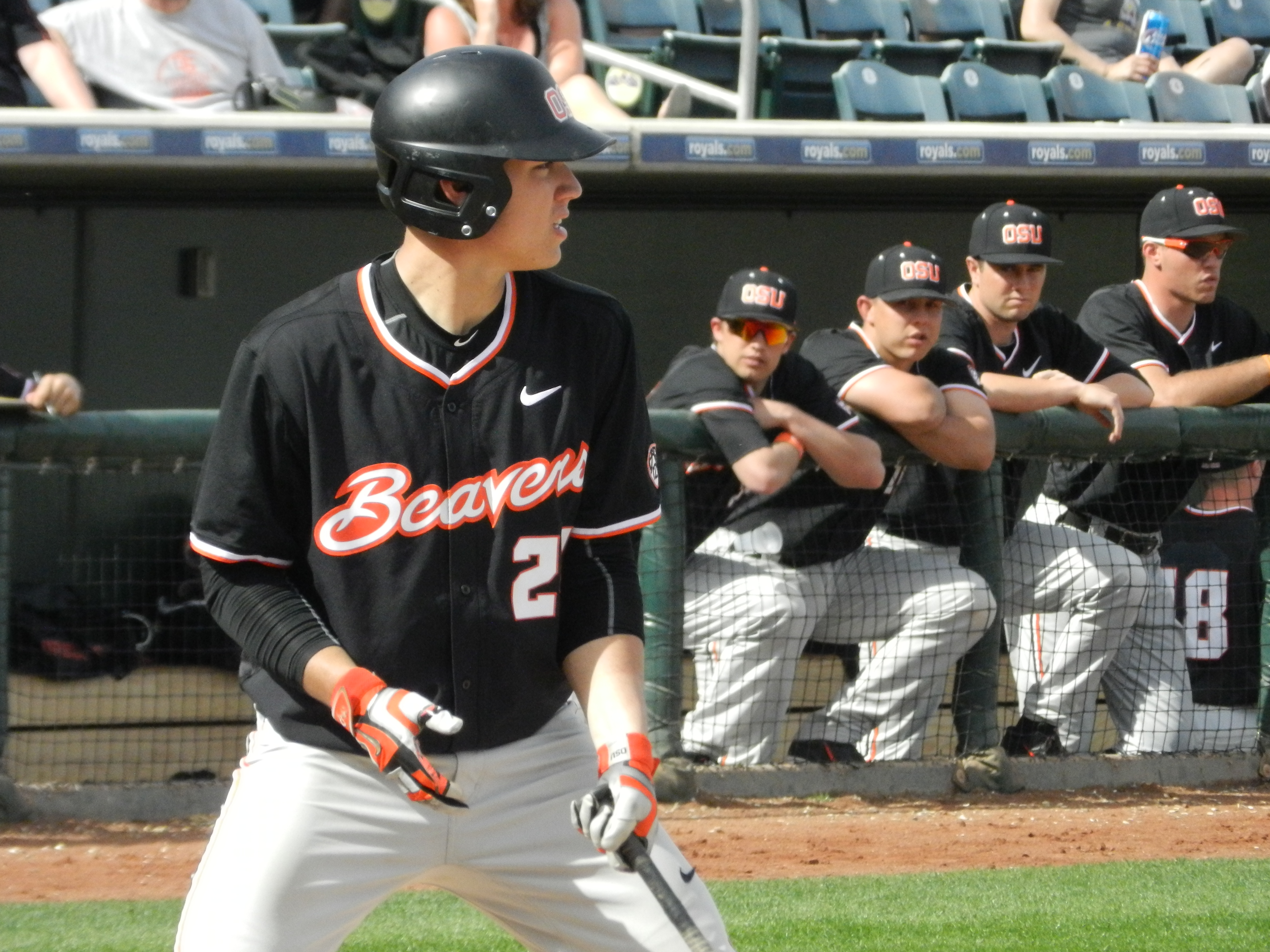
A Beavers baseball player during a game in 2015

The Oregon State University baseball program was established in 1907. It has since had nearly 100 players go on to play in the minor leagues and more than 45 go on to play in the majors. Most notable of these major league players are New York Yankees outfielder Jacoby Ellsbury, Los Angeles Dodgers second baseman Darwin Barney, New York Mets and San Francisco Giants outfielder Michael Conforto, Cleveland Guardians outfielder Steven Kwan, and Baltimore Orioles catcher Adley Rutschman.

Oregon State players have been named All-Americans 45 times, as of the end of the 2024 season. Oregon State baseball has produced 16 conference players of the year winners and 1 Golden Spikes Award winner, Adley Rutschman in 2019. The Golden Spikes Award is bestowed annually to the best amateur baseball player in the United States.

The baseball team has won its conference championship 26 times and has reached the College World Series seven times, first in 1952 and as recently as 2025. They won the NCAA championship in 2006, 2007, and 2018. The team is led by head coach Mitch Canham and they play at Goss Stadium at Coleman Field. Opened over a century ago, Coleman Field is located near the center of campus and is the oldest continuous use ballpark in the nation.

==== Basketball ====
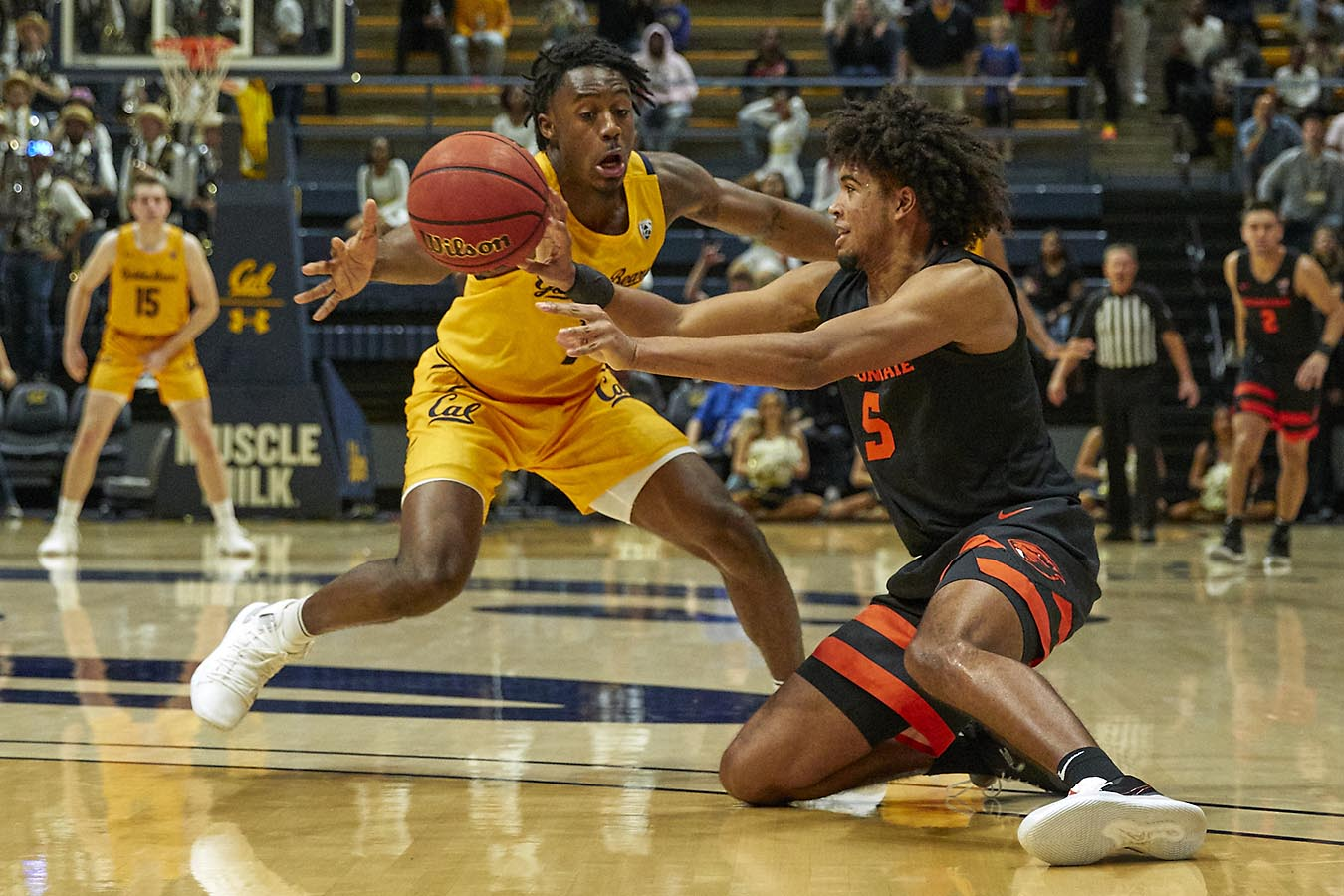
Oregon State v California game, 2020

The men's basketball team at Oregon State experienced periods of significant success from the early 1920s to the early 1990s—with 12 conference championships, 16 NCAA tournament appearances, and only 14 losing seasons from 1922 to 1991—but fell on hard times, suffering 19 losing seasons and made no NCAA tournament appearances from 1992 to 2015 before returning in 2016. The program has reached the Final Four of the NCAA tournament twice, the Elite Eight on six occasions, and 17 total tournament appearances. A number of former OSU players have gone on to have successful careers in the NBA, including 9-time NBA All-Star Gary Payton and "Iron Man" A.C. Green. OSU alumni have also won a total of 10 NBA championship rings and four Olympic gold medals.

The team has defeated rival Oregon more times than any other team has beaten an opponent in a collegiate sport, with 195 victories over the Ducks as of 2023. The Oregon State men's basketball holds the NCAA record for most games played against a single opponent with 362 games played against the Oregon Ducks men's basketball team and the NCAA record for 2nd most victories against a single opponent with 195 victories against the Ducks. As of 2023 they also have played rivals the Washington Huskies men's basketball 310 times (NCAA record 3rd most) and Washington State Cougars men's basketball 308 times (NCAA record 4th most)

Oregon State has had 75 all-conference and 32 All-America selections, five Pac-10 Players of the Year, 42 players selected in the NBA draft, and 24 players that have gone on to play in the NBA.

The basketball program has been eclipsed in recent times by the relative success of the OSU football and baseball programs, the latter of which has recently won three national championships.

Wayne Tinkle was hired as head coach prior to the 2014–15 season. His first team produced the program's second winning record in the last nine seasons and he then led the school to their first NCAA tournament appearance since 1990 in 2016. In 2021 he led the Beavers to a Pac-12 conference tournament title and an Elite Eight NCAA tournament finish.

==== Football ====
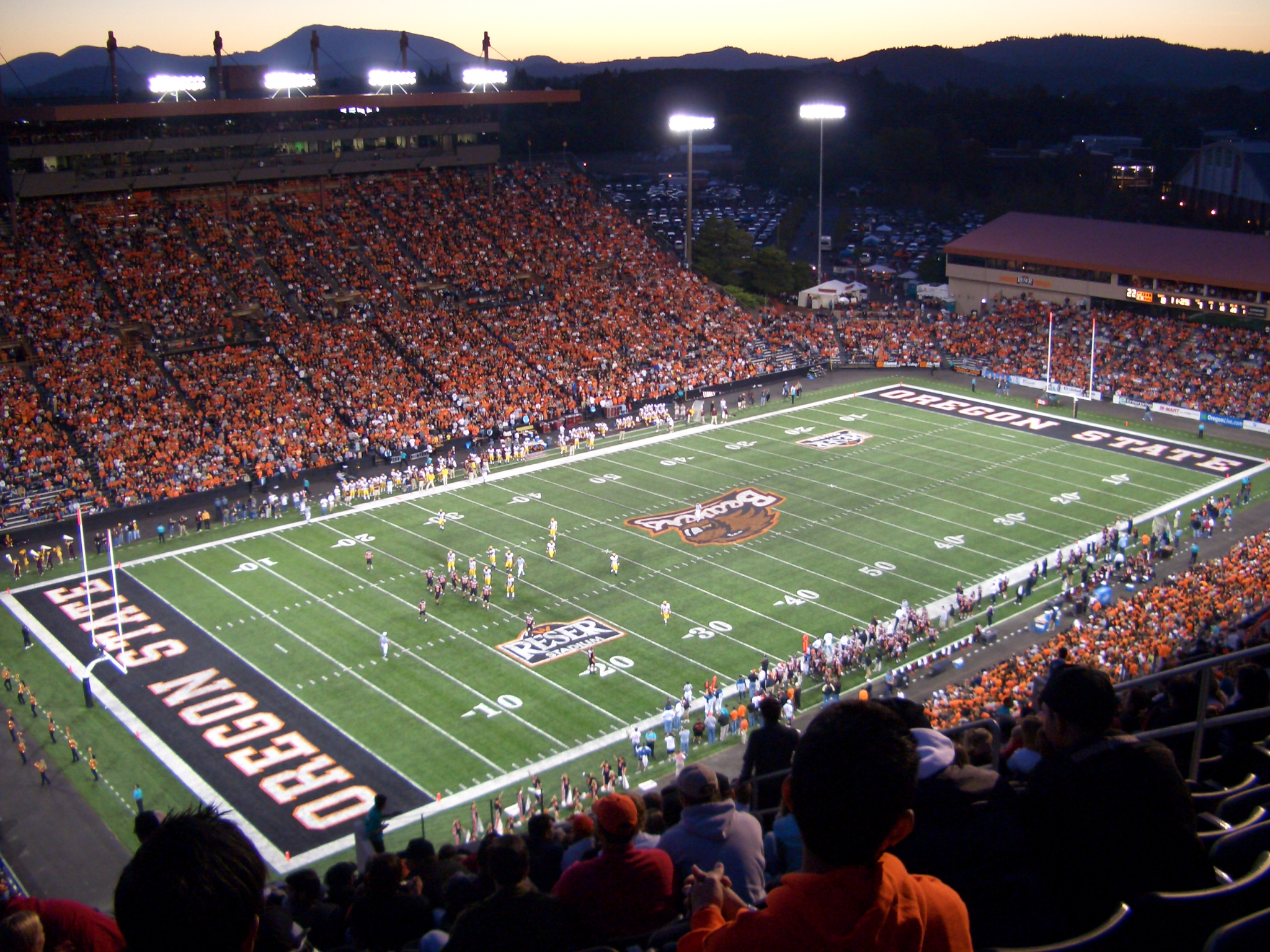
Reser Stadium, home to the football team

JaMarcus Shepherd is the current head coach, replacing Trent Bray.

The football program has been a part of Oregon State University since 1893, working as a platform for over a hundred players to enter the NFL, such as Heisman Trophy winner Terry Baker, New England Patriots running back Steven Jackson, New Orleans Saints running back Jacquizz Rodgers, Tennessee Titans punter Johnny Hekker, Miami Dolphins wide receiver Chad Ochocinco, Oakland Raiders wide receiver T. J. Houshmandzadeh, New Orleans Saints wide receiver Brandin Cooks, Washington Commanders linebacker Nick Barnett, Miami Dolphins safety Jordan Poyer, Buffalo Bills quarterback Derek Anderson, Kansas City Chiefs safety Sabby Piscitelli, Tampa Bay Buccaneers wide receiver Sammie Stroughter, Kansas City Chiefs quarterback Matt Moore, and Seattle Seahawks cornerback Brandon Browner.

Oregon State has had 53 first team All-Americans in the history of the program as of the end of the 2023 season, with 8 Consensus All-Americans and 2 Unanimous All-Americans.

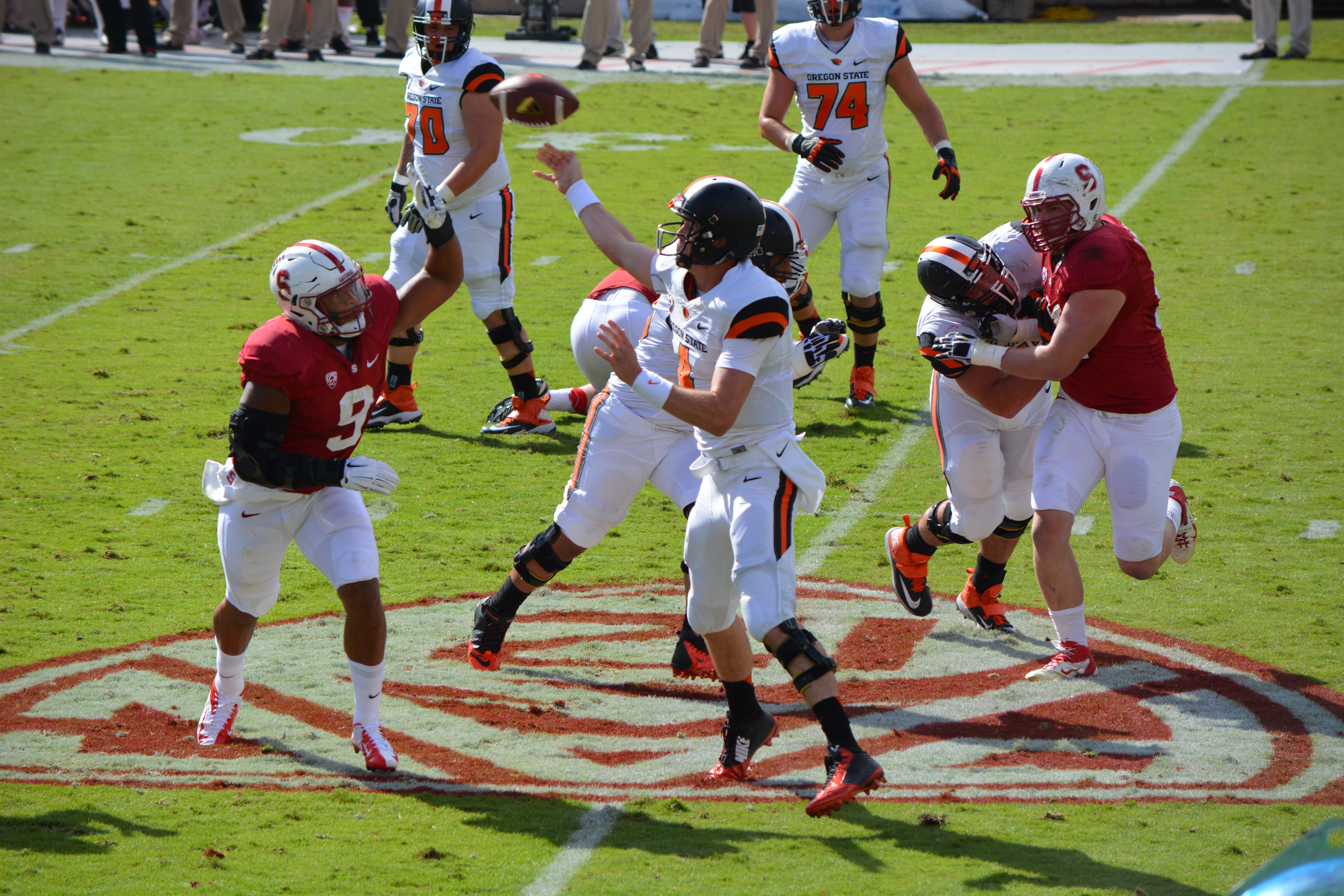
Oregon State (in white) v Stanford game in 2013

Oregon State football has won seven conference titles, done through four different conferences, although two of them have links to the current Pac-12 Conference, as the conference claims the history of the PCC as their own, and the Athletic Association of Western Universities was the first name for the conference that later became the Pac-12 Conference.

Oregon State University has played in 20 postseason bowl games. The Beavers have also played in the Mirage Bowl, but this was a regular season game and a "bowl" in name only, not a post-season invitational bowl game. The Beavers lost the 1980 edition of the game against No. 14 ranked UCLA 34–3 in front of 80,000 at National Olympic Stadium in Tokyo, Japan.

The 20 bowl game total does not include an invitation to play in the Gotham Bowl in 1960, when no opponent could be found for Oregon State. The Beavers are 12–8 in bowl game appearances.

Oregon State is the 2001 BCS Fiesta Bowl champions, 1942 Rose Bowl Champions, 1962 Liberty Bowl champions, 2006 & 2008 Sun Bowl champions, 2003 & 2022 Las Vegas Bowl champions, 1939 & 1948 Pineapple Bowl champions, 2004 Insight Bowl champions, 2007 Emerald Bowl champions, 2013 Hawaii Bowl champions, and has played in 3 Rose Bowls.

==== Soccer ====
The Oregon State Beavers men's soccer team was founded in 1988 and plays at 1,500 seat Paul Lorenz Field at Patrick Wayne Valley Stadium. They have had sustained success since the early to mid 2000s. The Beavers were Pac-12 Conference champions in 2021 and qualified for the NCAA national championship tournament on eight occasions, making their deepest runs in the tournament in 2021 reaching the quarter finals and in 2023 where they reached the College Cup (Semifinals). The team has produced one Hermann Trophy winner (Best collegiate soccer player in the nation) Gloire Amanda in 2020, seven NSCAA All-Americans and has had five players play for their respective national teams at the senior level. The team's all-time match record is 254–275–76 as of the end of the 2019 season.

The current coach of the Beavers is Greg Dalby, who took the position in January 2023 after serving as an assistant coach at Penn State University. Dalby replaced Terry Boss, who was hired as the men's soccer head coach in 2017, after previously serving as the lead assistant coach for the 2013 season. Boss has coached the Beavers to one conference championship and three NCAA tournament appearances.

==== Golf ====
Golf was first introduced as a school-sanctioned sport at Oregon State College in 1928. Prior to that date, golf existed on campus as a club sport with an organized team, but with its participants not receiving formal recognition from the university. The first coach of the OSC team was Tony Sottovia, formerly a professional player from Portland, who headed the squad for three years.

The Great Depression affected the golf program particularly leading to only one officially scheduled match 1931. Following that, there were no scheduled games for the next year. Golf again began to resurface in 1933 without official university support. In 1934, Ralph Coleman, head of OSC intramural athletics, was named golf coach. He would remain in this capacity until 1938, when he was named full-time baseball coach and basketball coach Amory T. "Slats" Gill was appointed to the position.

The Oregon State men's golf team finished the 1949-50 season 1st in the north division and 18th at the national championship tournament. In 1958-1959 they finished 2nd in the conference and 11th at the national championships. In 1965-1966 they finished 5th in the conference but 15th at the national championships. In 1993-1994 they finished 4th in the conference and 25th at the national championships. In the 2000-2001 season although finishing last in the conference they surprised many and finished in 12th place at the national championships. In the 2009-2010 season they finished 16th at the national championships and in the 2020-2021 season finished in 23rd at the national championships.

Oregon State men's golf has 3 individual conference champions (Bob Allard -1969, Scott Masingill -1971, and Alex Moore -2011)

The Oregon State men's golf team has produced 12 All-Americans, 2 PAC-12 Scholar-athletes of the Year (Alex Williams -2009 and Jonnie Motomochi -2012), 1 Pac-12 Freshman of the Year (John Lepak -1999), 31 All-Pac 12 selections, and many have become golf professionals.

The golf teams practice and compete at Oregon State's own Trysting Tree Golf Club, in East Corvallis. Built in 1988, the course is designed by the famed architect Ted Robinson and features many large, raised greens making approach shots very challenging. In 2017 Trysting Tree opened its new routing featuring three newly created holes by Native Oregonian and former Oregon State Golfer, Dan Hixson. This project also saw the addition of a new large practice facility for the Oregon State Golf Program. With five sets of tees the golf course can be played by all skill levels, and hosts many of Oregon's biggest championships including hosting the Pac-12 conference championships multiple times.

==== Rowing ====
Oregon State has provided 13 different athletes to the highest levels of rowing in the U.S. Over the past five years, a pair of former Beavers have represented America and the Oregon State rowing program. Most recently, these athletes include Josh Inman, Joey Hansen and Chris Callaghan.

Crew was established at Oregon State College on October 13, 1927, when the University of California presented two rowing shells to the school. The sport was initially organized as an intramural activity pitting the various academic classes against one another.

Throughout its history, rowing at Oregon State has been led by committed and visionary coaching. The school's first crew coach was James C. Othus, a former collegiate rower at Cornell University, who guided the program from its origin in 1927. Ed Stevens, another Cornell alumnus who had coached the Harvard University for three seasons, took over in 1932. Stevens would lead the program until 1949, during which time the Beavers gained recognition and respect as a highly competitive crew.

Karl Drlica took over from Coach Stevens and would lead the program for the next 30 years. One of Coach Drlica's first moves was to establish women as an integral part of the program when he started intramural competition in 1952. OSU was one of the first collegiate programs to support women's rowing.

The achievements of Coach Drlica and his crews were recognized in 1967 when the Board of Intercollegiate Athletics accepted the men's heavyweight crew as a varsity sport. Ten years later, Coach Drlica would orchestrate the elevation of women's and lightweight rowing to varsity status as well.

In 1983 the athletic department hired Dave Emigh to assist with the crew program and in 1985 he was named the head coach. Emigh spent 11 years at OSU and continued to develop the program with the same innovative styles of his predecessors. Under Emigh, the crew achieved stability within the athletic department and firmly established itself as a leader in West Coast rowing.

Fred Honebein joined the Oregon State family in 2004 and led his squad to a ninth-place finish at the Intercollegiate Rowing Association Championships. The Beavers' finish marked the fifth straight year they had finished among the top ten in the nation and the eighth time in ten years.

Steve Todd has been named interim head coach of the Oregon State University men's rowing program for the 2006–07 season. Todd succeeded former head coach Fred Honebein in June after leading the Beavers to a 14th-place finish at the Intercollegiate Rowing Association national championships. A former rower at the University of Washington, Todd rowed to a national championship in the Huskies' JV8 in 1997 and earned medals in the Varsity boat in 1998 and 1999. Todd has been a part of the Oregon State rowing program for four years as the men's freshman coach. During his time with the Beavers, Todd's crews have medaled all four years at the Pac-10 Championships including a silver medal finish in 2003. Tood's 2003 crew of rookies also took second at the San Diego Crew Classic and in the process upset traditional powerhouse Washington. Most recently, Todd's Freshman 4+ finished fourth at the IRA Regatta in June.

Dave Friedericks is in his first season as the men's rowing assistant coach. Friedericks, a former member of the U.S. national team, directed the Lake Oswego Community Rowing Center for the past two years. While at Lake Oswego, Friedericks helped grow the club from a group of a dozen members to a membership of 75 with an additional 100 rowers taking classes.

The Oregon State University Men's Varsity 8+ had a 10th-place finish at the 2007 Intercollegiate Rowing Association Championships.

==== Wrestling ====
Traditionally, the Oregon State wrestling team has been a national powerhouse, winning their conference championship 53 times and finishing in the NCAA top-ten 21 times (2nd twice, in 1973 & 1995) since the inception of the team in 1909, 115 seasons. They have 12 individual NCAA championship titles and have 90 individual All-Americans (of which 2 athletes earned 4 time all-Americans by Babak Mohammadi (1991, 1992, 1994, & 1995) and Larry Bielenberg (1974–1977)). Pre-NCAA in 1926, OSU won the Amateur Athletic Association team national championship. Dale Thomas, Oregon State coach from 1957 to 1990 and National Wrestling Hall of Fame member, holds the NCAA record for most dual meet wins in a coaching career at 616. Additionally, seven OSU alumni have gone on to represent the United States in the Olympics, including in 1924 where Oregon State alumni won both the gold and silver medals in the same weight class. Only 5 of Oregon State's 90 seasons have resulted in a losing record. Oregon State's all-time dual meet record at the end of the 2009–10 season is 950–307–26, ranked 3rd in the NCAA for most all-time wins. With the retiring after the 2005–06 season of one of OSU's most successful coaches, Joe Wells, National Wrestling Hall of Fame member Jim Zalesky was named head coach, currently in his 8th season with the Beavers.

=== Women's sports ===
==== Basketball ====
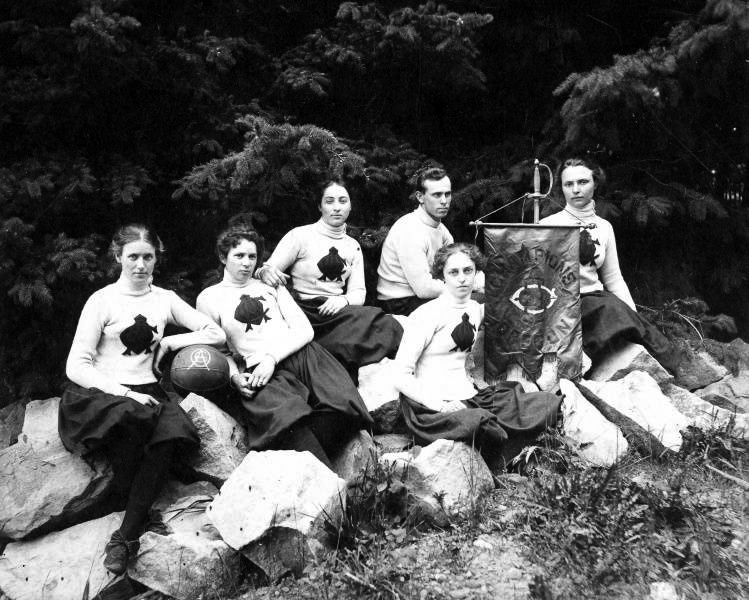
Women's basketball team c. 1900

The women's basketball program at Oregon State has long been a power. From the 1980s and Carol Menken, to the Mid-1990s with the teams led by Tanja Kostic that made it to the NCAA tournament. More recently Oregon State women's basketball has seen many strong players. Felicia Ragland, whose number was since retired, played for OSU in the early 2000s before a career in the WNBA.

Oregon State women's basketball has produced 5 Pac-12 Player of the Years (Tanja Kostic -1995 & 1996, Felicia Raglan -2001, Jamie Weisner -2016, Ruth Hamblin -2015), 3 Pac-12 Scholar Athletes of the Year (Mikayla Pivec -2020, Sydney Wiese -2017, Ruth Hamblin -2016), 4 Pac-12 Defensive Players of the Year (Marie Gülich -2018, Gabriella Hanson -2017, Ruth Hamblin -2015 & 2016), 3 Pac-12 Sixth Player of the Year (Aleah Goodman -2018), Raegan Beers -2023, Timea Gardiner -2024) 3 Pac-12 Freshman of the Year (Kari Parriott -1988, Tanja Kostic -1993, Raegan Beers -2023) 13 All-Americans, 14 First team All-Pac-12 selections, 76 All Conference Team selections, 90 Conference All-Academic Team selections, and 4 Olympians.

Scott Rueck has led the program to new heights in recent years, guiding the Beavers to the 2015, 2016, and 2017 Pac-12 Conference regular season titles, the 2016 Pac-12 Conference Tournament title, the 2025 WCC Conference Tournament title in the school's first season in the West Coast Conference, as well as nine NCAA tournament berths (2014, 2015, 2016, 2017, 2018, 2019, 2021, 2024, 2025), 3 Elite Eight finishes (2016, 2018, 2024), and a Final Four (2016).

==== Golf ====
The women's golf team has had numerous athletes to go on to play professionally. Mary Budke won the 1974 AIAW individual collegiate golf national championship.

Oregon State women's golf team finished 16th at the NCAA national championship tournament in the 1998-1999 season and 22nd in the nation in 2022-2023 & 2023-2024 seasons.

Oregon State women's golf has produced 1 All-American (Kathleen Takaishi -1998), 8 All-Conference selections and 40 Academic All-American Scholars.

==== Gymnastics ====
The women's gymnastics team is historically known as one of the best teams in the country. They were ranked #13 in the nation in the 2006 Preseason Coaches' Poll, and had one of the strongest schedules in the nation. The Beavers came in second all-around at the 2006 NCAA West Regional, qualifying for the NCAA Championships hosted on their home turf at Oregon State.

The Oregon State women's gymnastics team finished 7th in the national championships in 1979, 4th in 1980, 1981 and 1982, 9th in 1983, 6th in 1985, 7th in 1988, 1989 and 1990, 4th in 1991, 6th in 1992, 7th in 1993 & 1994, 6th in 1995, 5th in 1996, 8th in 2010 & 2011, and 6th in 2019.

OSU gymnasts have won seven national championships on floor exercise and balance beam, most recently Amy Durham on floor in 1993.

Oregon State women's gymnastics has produced over 115 All-Americans, 12 All-Around All-Americans. 15 Oregon State gymnasts have earned at least two first team All-American honors with Joy Selig having the most with 7 1st Team All-American selections, followed by Jade Carey with 6 1st team All-American selections and Chari Knight with 6 1st team All-American selections.

Oregon State women's gymnastics has produced 4 Olympians in 5 Olympic games (Patti Jo Knorr in 1980 -boycotted 1980 Olympics, (Olivia Vivian in 2008, Madeline Gardiner in 2012, Jade Carey winning gold in both in 2020 & 2024)

==== Soccer ====
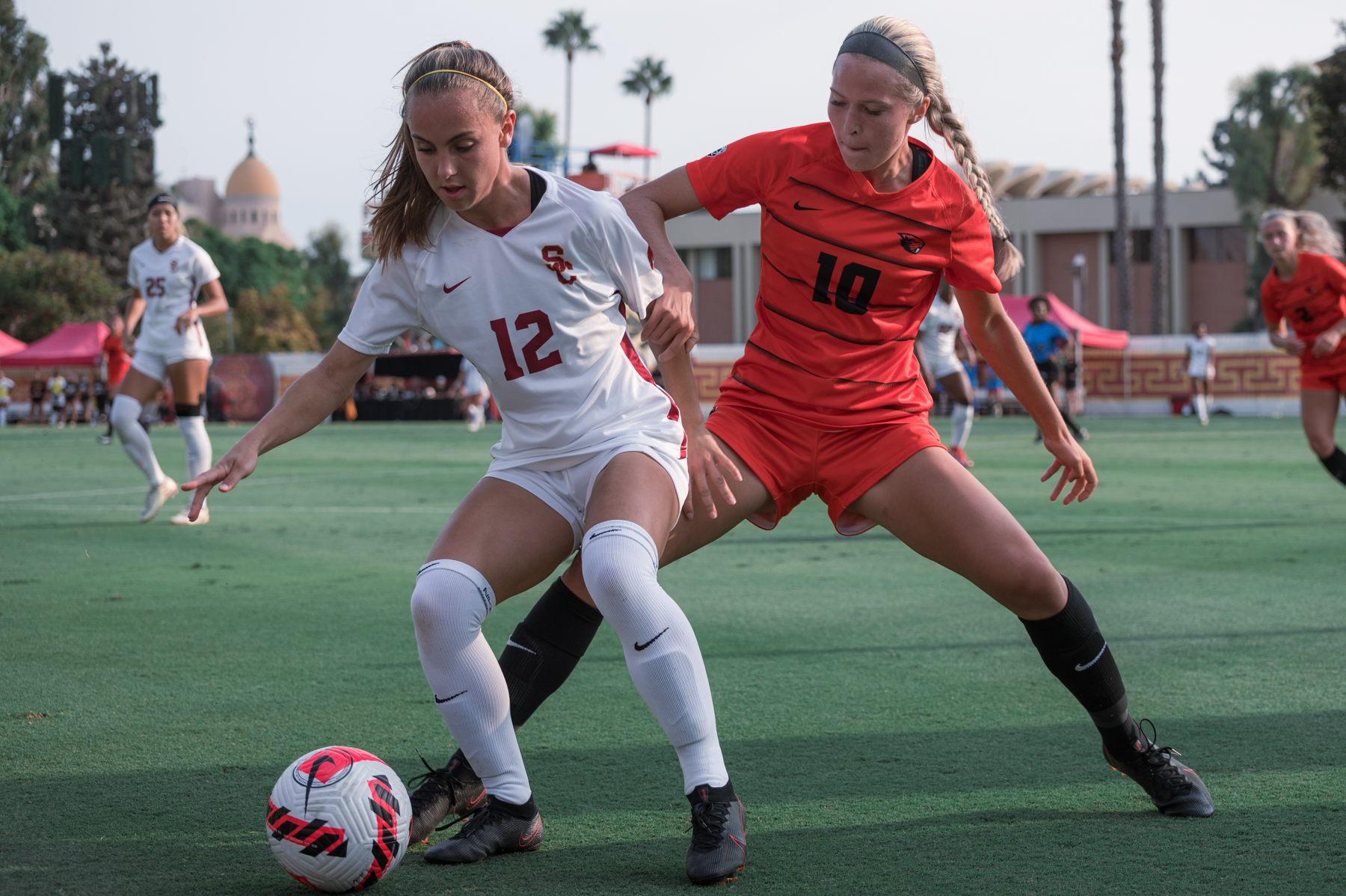
Oregon State v USC match in 2021

Oregon State women's soccer team's head coach is Linus Rhodes, formerly an assistant coach for eight years at OSU.

The 1994 Oregon State women's soccer team earned the first NCAA tournament berth in program history, and in 2009 upset host Ohio State and nationally seeded Florida in the first two rounds to advance to the Sweet 16. They have participated in the NCAA national championship tournament 4 times. (1994, 2009, 2010, 2011)

Oregon State women's soccer has produced over 200 Conference All-Academic players, 44 All-Conference team selections, and 1 Pac-12 Freshman of the Year (Jenna Richardson 2010)

==== Softball ====
The women's softball team was co-champion for the Pac-10 title in 2005, ending the season with a 43–16 record. They have made NCAA regional tournament appearances 15 times including nine years in a row (1999-2007), including the 2006 season where they made it to the Women's College World Series (WCWS). The team has appeared in the WCWS five times (1977, 1978, 1979, 2006, 2022). They were ranked #12 in the nation in the 2006 ESPN.com/USA Softball Preseason Top 25 Collegiate Poll.

They had a 28-game winning streak in the 2006 season, the longest win streak the NCAA had seen since 2002 and the longest in the history of the program at Oregon State. The 28-game streak ranks 16th(t) all-time in the NCAA Division I record book for longest win streak, and the Beavers are one of just 11 teams in NCAA history to win 28 straight games.

Oregon State softball has produced 14 All-Americans, the Pac-12 conference Pitcher of the Year in 2005, and 130 All-Conference team selections.

==== Track and field and cross country ====
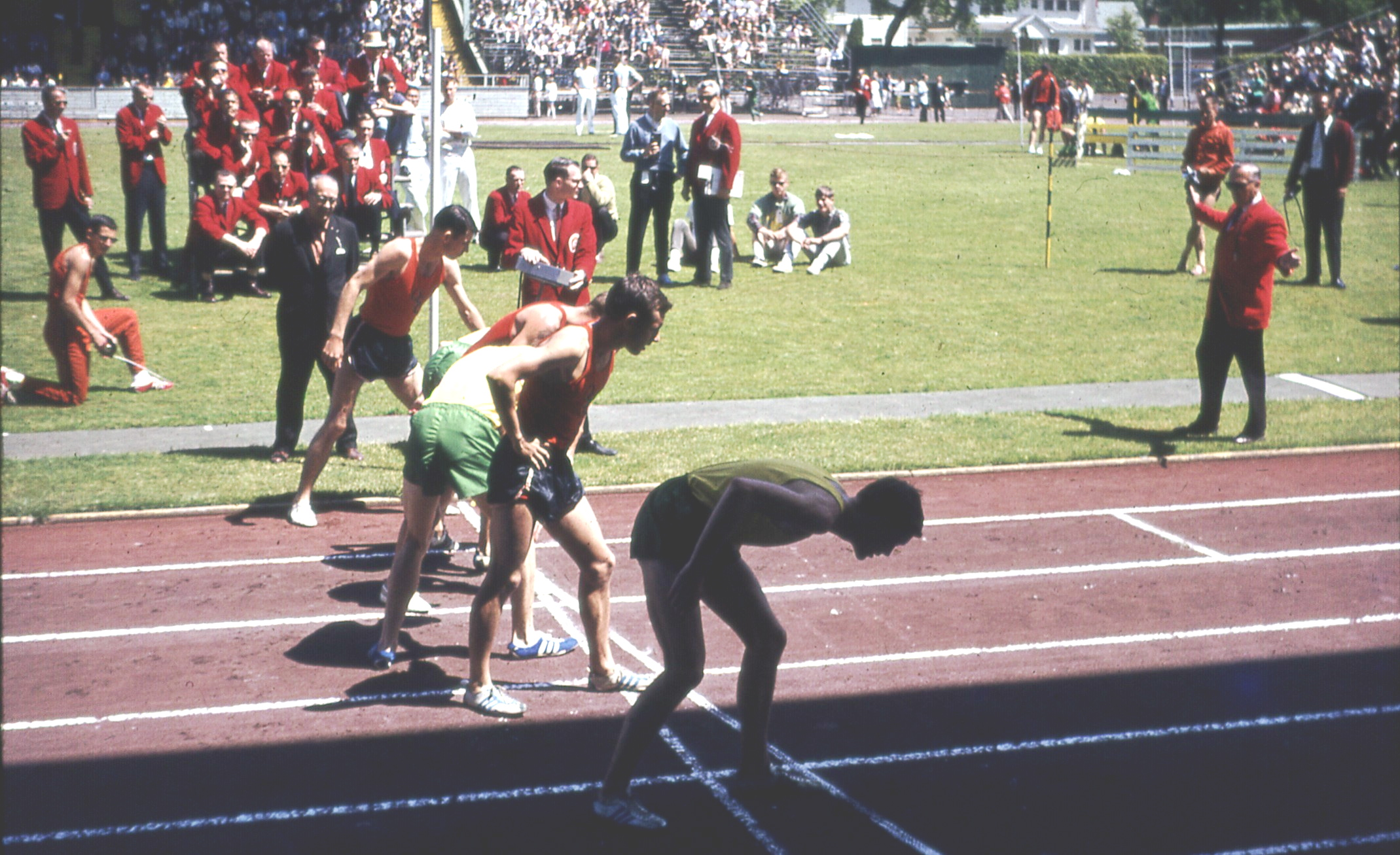
Oregon State track team in 1966

The Oregon State track and field and cross country programs were cut in 1988, but began a comeback in 2004 with the return of a women's distance program, led by Kelly Sullivan, the former coach of Willamette University. The Beavers compete largely in smaller, Division 3 meets, but have enjoyed some success in the Pac-12 Conference, including a ninth-place finish by Ashley Younce in the 2006 Western Regional NCAA track & field meet and recently the graduation of three-time All-American and holder of five school-records, Laura Carlyle.

In 2017, Louie Quintana, former long time assistant at Arizona State, assumed the helm at Oregon State and has preceded to lead the program to new heights. Including the first post season NCAA Cross Country appearance in 2018.

In 2021 the women's cross country team finished 16th in the NCAA national championships and 23rd in 2022.

Oregon State women's cross country has produced 5 All-Americans, 15 All-Conference selections and 2 All-Academic honors. Track and Field has seen the recent development of the program through the success of multiple events - namely the steeplechase with the All American performances by Kaylee Mitchell and Grace Fetherstonhaugh.

Men's track and field and cross country is confined to the club level, the men's cross country team in 1961 were NCAA national champions. The men's track program produced 16 individual NCAA national champions prior to being disbanded in 1988. Individual male athletes from the football team have recently joined the Women's team at meets and compete individually, among them Jordan Bishop was an All-American in the high jump in 2010.

The completion of Phase One of the 1,500 seat Whyte Track & Field Center is considered a giant step in the efforts to fully re-establish the program on both the women's and men's team.

==== Volleyball ====
Historically, a team that has competed well in the ultra-competitive Pac-12 conference, the OSU women's volleyball team has qualified for the NCAA tournament 4 times (2001, 2004, 2014, 2017) and advanced to the Sweet 16 in 2014.

Previous to the NCAA tournament they qualified for a national championship tournament 5 other times (1970, 1977, 1978, 1979, 1980) finishing as a national top 8 quarterfinalist in 1970.

Oregon State women's volleyball has produced 3 All-Americans (Rachel Rourke 2009, Mary-Kate Marshall 2014 & 2016)

=== Defunct sports ===
==== Men's cross country ====
The Oregon State men's cross country team were national champions in 1961 and gave the beavers their 1st NCAA team championship in the school's history. (In 1926 the Westling team gave the Beavers their overall 1st team championship when they won a national AAU championship)

The Oregon State track and field and cross country programs were cut in 1988 for financial reasons.

==== Men's track and field ====
The track laid in 1974 was the first in the United States to use metric rather than US customary units, based on a circuit of 400 meters rather than 440 yards.

==== Women's swimming ====
Oregon State's most recent dive into women's swimming came in 1973–74, but the sport took hold at the school long before that. The Beaver yearbook for the 1914–15 school year shows a swim team photo in the Girls Athletics section. The first mention of women's swimming as an intercollegiate sport came in the 1920 Beaver, reporting on Oregon Agricultural College's victory over the University of Oregon in the second annual spring meet in 1919.

In 1973-74, OSU began its Department of Women's Intercollegiate Athletics and women's swimming was elevated from a club sport to varsity status. Oregon State was a member of the AIAW prior to joining the NCAA.

The Women's Swim Team finished runner-up in Conference 3 times (1980, 1982, 1983) and 3rd place 5 times (1974, 1975, 1979, 1981, 1984). Many swimming athletes broke Conference and NCAA National records including the NCAA 200 butterfly in 2008 (Saori Haruguchi) and produced 9 All-Americans between 1994 and 2015 and multiple All-Academic athletes.

The swim team practiced and competed at 250 seat Steven's Natatorium inside the Dixon Recreation Center on the main campus of Oregon State University in Corvallis once it was completed in 1992. In 2014 they competed and practiced off-campus in Corvallis at the 860 seat Osborn Aquatic Center.

The Swimming program was discontinued following the 2018-2019 season due to "a comprehensive review of all sports, and facility requirements contributed to this decision as we realize that OSU campus pool facilities do not meet NCAA standards. It is cost prohibitive to renovate existing campus swimming facilities and a new swimming and diving facility would cost about $20 million to build, not including the cost of annual maintenance."

== Championships ==
=== NCAA team championships ===
Oregon State has won 4 NCAA team national championships.

- Men's (4)
  - Baseball (3): 2006, 2007, 2018
  - Cross Country (1): 1961
- see also:
  - Pac-12 Conference NCAA championships
  - List of NCAA schools with the most NCAA Division I championships

=== Other national team championships ===
The Beavers have won 28 national team titles that were not bestowed by the NCAA. 27 of them are for Racquetball, 1 for Westling:

- Men's:
  - Wrestling (1): 1926 (AAU)
  - Racquetball (5): 2013, 2015, 2019, 2023, 2024
- Women's:
  - Racquetball (8): 2006, 2009, 2010, 2011, 2012, 2013, 2014, 2017
- Coed
  - Racquetball (14): 2006, 2008, 2009, 2010, 2011, 2012, 2013, 2014, 2015, 2016, 2017, 2018, 2023, 2024

=== NCAA individual championships ===
Oregon State athletes have multiple NCAA individual national championships.

- Men's (28)
  - Track and Field (16):
    - 1952 -Lyle Dickey (Pole Vault)
    - 1959 -Wayne Moss (High Jump)
    - 1963 -Norm Hoffman (800 Meters)
    - 1963 -Morgan Groth (1500 Meters)
    - 1964 -Morgan Groth (1500 Meters)
    - 1968 -Dick Fosbury (High Jump)
    - 1969 -Dick Fosbury (High Jump)
    - 1969 -Jim Barkley (Steeplechase)
    - 1969 -Steve DeAutremont (Hammer Throw)
    - 1970 -Steve DeAutremont (Hammer Throw)
    - 1970 -Willie Turner (200 Meters)
    - 1974 -Ed Lipscomb (Pole Vault)
    - 1974 -Jim Judd (Javalin)
    - 1979 -Hassan El Kashief (400 Meters)
    - 1982 -Hassan El Kashief (400 Meters)
    - 1988 -Karl Van Calcar (Steeplechase)
  - Wrestling (12):
    - 1961 Don Conway (118 Wight class)
    - 1969 Jess Lewis (Heavyweight class)
    - 1970 Jess Lewis (Heavyweight class)
    - 1971 Roger Weigel (134 Weight class)
    - 1973 Greg Strobel (190 Weight class)
    - 1974 Greg Strobel (190 Weight class)
    - 1975 Larry Berenberg (Heavyweight class)
    - 1978 Dan Hicks (142 Weight class)
    - 1979 Dan Hicks (142 Weight class)
    - 1980 Howard Harris (Heavyweight class)
    - 1995 Les Gutches (177 Weight class)
    - 1996 Les Gutches (177 Weight class)
- Women's (7)
  - Gymnastics (6):
    - 1982 -Mary Ayotte-Law (floor)
    - 1984 -Heidi Anderson (balance beam)
    - 1989 -Joy Selig (balance beam)
    - 1990 -Joy Selig (balance beam)
    - 1990 -Joy Selig (floor)
    - 1993 -Amy Durham (floor)
  - Swimming & Diving (1):
    - 2008 Saori Haruguchi (200 Butterfly)

=== Other national individual championships ===
Oregon State athletes have multiple individual national championships.

- Women's:
  - Golf (1): 1974 (AIAW) -Mary Budke
  - Gymnastics (1): 1981 (AIAW) -Laurie Carter (balance beam)

== Notable non varsity sports ==
=== Racquetball ===
The Racquetball Team was founded in 2001 and has been one of the most successful teams in the university's history. They have 27 National titles, including 11 in a row overall Team Titles from 2008 to 2018 and have had multiple All-Americans. 14 Overall Team National Titles, 5 Men's Team Titles, and 8 Women's Team titles. Overall Team Titles: 2006, 2008, 2009, 2010, 2011, 2012, 2013, 2014, 2015, 2016, 2017, 2018, 2023, and 2024. Men's Team Titles: 2013, 2015, 2019, 2023, 2024 Women's Team Titles: 2006, 2009, 2010, 2011, 2012, 2013, 2014, 2017

=== Lacrosse ===
The Oregon State University lacrosse club was formed in 1971. They play in the MCLA.

=== Rugby ===
The Oregon State University rugby club was formed in 1961. In recent years Oregon State rugby has played in the Northwest Conference against In-Conference rivals such as Oregon, Washington and Washington State. Beginning with the 2012–13 season, however, Oregon State is leaving the Northwest Conference and joining other schools from the Pac-12 to form a new rugby conference that will mirror the Pac-12 and bring increased exposure. Oregon State rugby has been successful in recent years. The Beavers finished the 2012 season ranked #9 in the nation, and finished the 2011 season ranked #12. Oregon State played an undefeated regular season in 2012 and was champion of the Northwest conference in 2012, qualifying for the playoffs for the national DI-AA championship.

=== Disc golf ===
Founded in 2011, the disc golf club competes in the Oregon Collegiate Disc Golf League and in March 2019 placed 10th at the National Collegiate Disc Golf Championships in Appling, Georgia.

=== Indoor rock climbing ===
The indoor rock climbing club was formed in 2015 as a club sport at OSU. The climbing club competes against other schools in the Pacific Northwest as part of the Northwest Collegiate Climbing Circuit (NC3).

=== Bass fishing ===
The Oregon State bass fishing team was founded in 2012.

== Beaver Nation ==
Oregon State University's fans, alumni, and supporters are commonly referred to as Beaver Nation by the media and are credited with giving the Beavers a home field/court advantage at all of OSU's sporting events. Reser Stadium, Gill Coliseum, and Goss Stadium at Coleman Field are regularly filled by fans dressed in the school colors.

Beaver Nation has also developed a reputation for "traveling well" to support its various teams, with large numbers of orange and black clad fans following the Beavers to away games, bowl games, and tournaments.

Some of the most prominent events showcasing OSU's rabid fan support and willingness to travel include the 2001 Fiesta Bowl, 2012 Alamo Bowl, 2016 Women's Final Four, and College World Series tournaments in 2005, 2006, 2007, 2013, 2017, and 2018. In 2000, Oregon State's football team finished with a 10–1 regular season record and an invitation to the 2001 Fiesta Bowl. The Beavers football team brought an estimated 38,000 fans with them to Tempe, Arizona and went on to win against Notre Dame by a score of 42–3. In June 2006 and again in June 2007, Oregon State's baseball team made consecutive trips to Omaha, Nebraska for the College World Series. Beaver Nation showed up by the thousands at Rosenblatt Stadium. The fan base showed up again in Omaha for the 2018 College World Series at TD Ameritrade Stadium.

== Beaver Sports Radio Network ==
The Beaver Sports Radio Network members broadcast a number of Beaver athletic events. Mike Parker is the primary announcer and has been the voice of the Beavers since 1999. The members as of February 1, 2012 include:

City	Callsign	Frequency
Astoria*	KAST-AM	1370
Baker City*	KBKR-AM	1490
Bend	KCOE	940
Burns	KZHC-FM	92.7
Coos Bay	KBBR-AM	1340
Corvallis	KEJO-AM	1240
Corvallis**	KTHH-AM	990
Cottage Grove	KNND-AM	1400
Dallas (Spanish)	KWIP-AM	880
Enterprise	KWVR-AM	1340
Enterprise	KWVR-FM	92.1
Eugene	KKNX-AM	840 (HD)
Eugene	KEED	1540 AM
Florence	KCFM-FM	104.1/103.1
Florence	KCFM-AM	1250
Grants Pass	KAKT-FM	104.7
Hermiston	KOHU-AM	1360
Klamath Falls	KLAD-AM	960
LaGrande*	KLBM-AM	1450
Lakeview*	KORV FM	93.5
Medford	KAKT-FM	105.1
Medford	KCNX-AM	880
Newport	KNPT-AM	1310
Ontario	KBXN-AM	1380
Pendleton^	KUMA-AM	1290
Pendleton*	KTIX-AM	1240
Portland	KEX-AM	1190
Portland	KPOJ-AM	620
Portland	KPAM-AM	860
Portland	KKOV-AM	1550
Prineville	KRCO-AM	690
Roseburg	KSKR-AM	1490
Salem	KBZY-AM	1490
The Dalles	KODL-AM	1440
Tillamook*	KTIL-AM	1590
Tillamook	KTIL-FM	95.9
Waldport	KWDP-AM	820
Nationwide	Satellite Radio	Sirius XM
World-Wide	Internet Streaming	CBS Interactive

*Football Only
**Women's Basketball Only
***Baseball Only
^Talk Show Only

== See also ==
- Oregon Sports Hall of Fame
