= McNary High School =

Location
- 595 Chemawa Road; Keizer, Marion County, Oregon 97003; United States; 45.000744°N 123.0336326°W

Information
- Type: Public
- Opened: 1965
- School district: Salem-Keizer School District
- Principal: Scott Gragg
- Teaching staff: 84.21 (FTE)
- Grades: 9-12
- Enrollment: 2,058 (2023–2024)
- Student to teacher ratio: 24.44
- Colors: Royal Blue and White
- Athletics conference: OSAA 6A-6 Central Valley Conference
- Mascot: Celtic
- Team name: Celtics
- Rivals: South Salem High School, West Salem High School
- Newspaper: The Piper
- Feeder schools: Claggett Creek Middle School, Whiteaker Middle School
- Website: McNary High School Homepage

McNary High School (MHS) is the only public high school located in Keizer, Oregon, United States.

== History ==
In December 1962, voters passed a bond that would relieve overcrowding in North Salem and South Salem High Schools.

The naming process was confusing. Many proposed for the school to be named "North Salem High School" and the "old" North Salem High School to be named "Capitol High School." However, it was decided that the school would be named after Charles L. McNary.

== Academics ==
In 2008, 83% of the school's seniors received a high school diploma. Of 444 students, 368 graduated, 47 dropped out, and 29 were still in high school the following year.

In 2021, the graduation rate was 91%.

In 2022, 91% of the school's seniors received a high school diploma. Of 513 students, 478 graduated and 35 dropped out.

== Athletics ==
McNary High School athletic teams compete in the OSAA 6A-6 Central Valley Conference (excluding Football, which competes in 6A-SD1.)

=== State championships ===
- Band: 2026
- Baseball: 1989, 1992, 2009
- Boys Basketball: 1968
- Cheerleading: 2005
- Choir: 2011
- Football: 1997, 2001
- Softball: 1990†
- Wrestling: 1975

(†=Tied with one or more schools)

== Notable alumni ==
- Austin Bibens-Dirkx, former professional baseball player, Texas Rangers
- Howard Harris, collegiate wrestler, Oregon State, and member of the 1980 United States Olympic team
- Grayson Boucher, nicknamed "The Professor", professional streetball basketball player
- John Moen drummer and harmony for the indie rock band, the Decemberists, Stephen Malkmus & the Jicks, Elliott Smith, and Robert Pollard's Boston Spaceships
- Anthony Hudson, artist known for drag clown persona Carla Rossi

== Notable faculty ==
- Victor Backlund, McNary football and baseball coach
