= 1974 NCAA Division I Wrestling Championships =

American collegiate wrestling tournament

Tournament information
- Sport: College wrestling
- Location: Ames, Iowa
- Dates: March 14, 1974–March 16, 1974
- Host(s): Iowa State University
- Venue(s): Hilton Coliseum

Final positions
- Champions: Oklahoma (7th title)
- 1st runners-up: Michigan
- 2nd runners-up: Oklahoma State
- MVP: Floyd Hitchcock (Bloomsburg)

The 1974 NCAA Division I Wrestling Championships were the 44th NCAA Division I Wrestling Championships to be held. Iowa State University in Ames, Iowa hosted the tournament at Hilton Coliseum.

Oklahoma took home the team championship with 69.5 points and two individual champions.

Floyd Hitchcock of Bloomsburg was named the Most Outstanding Wrestler and Jim Woods of Western Illinois received the Gorriaran Award.

== Team results ==
Rank	School	Points
1	Oklahoma	69.5
2	Michigan	67
3	Oklahoma State	64
4	Iowa State	63
5	Iowa	48.5
6	Washington	44.5
7	Penn State	43
8	Oregon State	39.5
9	Lehigh	35
10	Slippery Rock	33.5

== Individual finals ==
Weight class	Championship match (champion in boldface)
118 lbs	**Gary Breece**, Oklahoma DEC Jack Spates, Slippery Rock, 3–2
126 lbs	**Pat Milkovich**, Michigan State DEC Billy Martin, Oklahoma State, 5–2
134 lbs	**Tom Sculley**, Lehigh DEC Jim Miller, Northern Iowa, 4–3
142 lbs	**Rich Lawinger**, Wisconsin DEC Steve Randall, Oklahoma State, 8–2
150 lbs	**Jarrett Hubbard**, Michigan DEC Bob Holland, Iowa State, 14–7
158 lbs	**Rod Kilgore**, Oklahoma DEC Larry Zilverber, Minnesota, 9–7
167 lbs	**Doug Wyn**, Western Michigan DEC Jeff Callard, Oklahoma, 5–2
177 lbs	**Floyd Hitchcock**, Bloomsburg DEC Mel Renfro, Washington, 10–4
190 lbs	**Greg Strobel**, Oregon State DEC Ben Ohai, Brigham Young, 7–2
UNL	**Jim Woods**, Western Illinois DEC Gary Ernst, Michigan, 9–5
