= 1980 NCAA Division I Wrestling Championships =

American collegiate wrestling tournament

Tournament information
- Sport: College wrestling
- Location: Corvallis, Oregon
- Dates: March 13, 1980–March 15, 1980
- Host: Oregon State University
- Venue: Gill Coliseum

Final positions
- Champions: Iowa (5th title)
- 1st runners-up: Oklahoma State
- 2nd runners-up: Iowa State

Tournament statistics
- Attendance: 27,169
- MVP: Howard Harris (Oregon State)

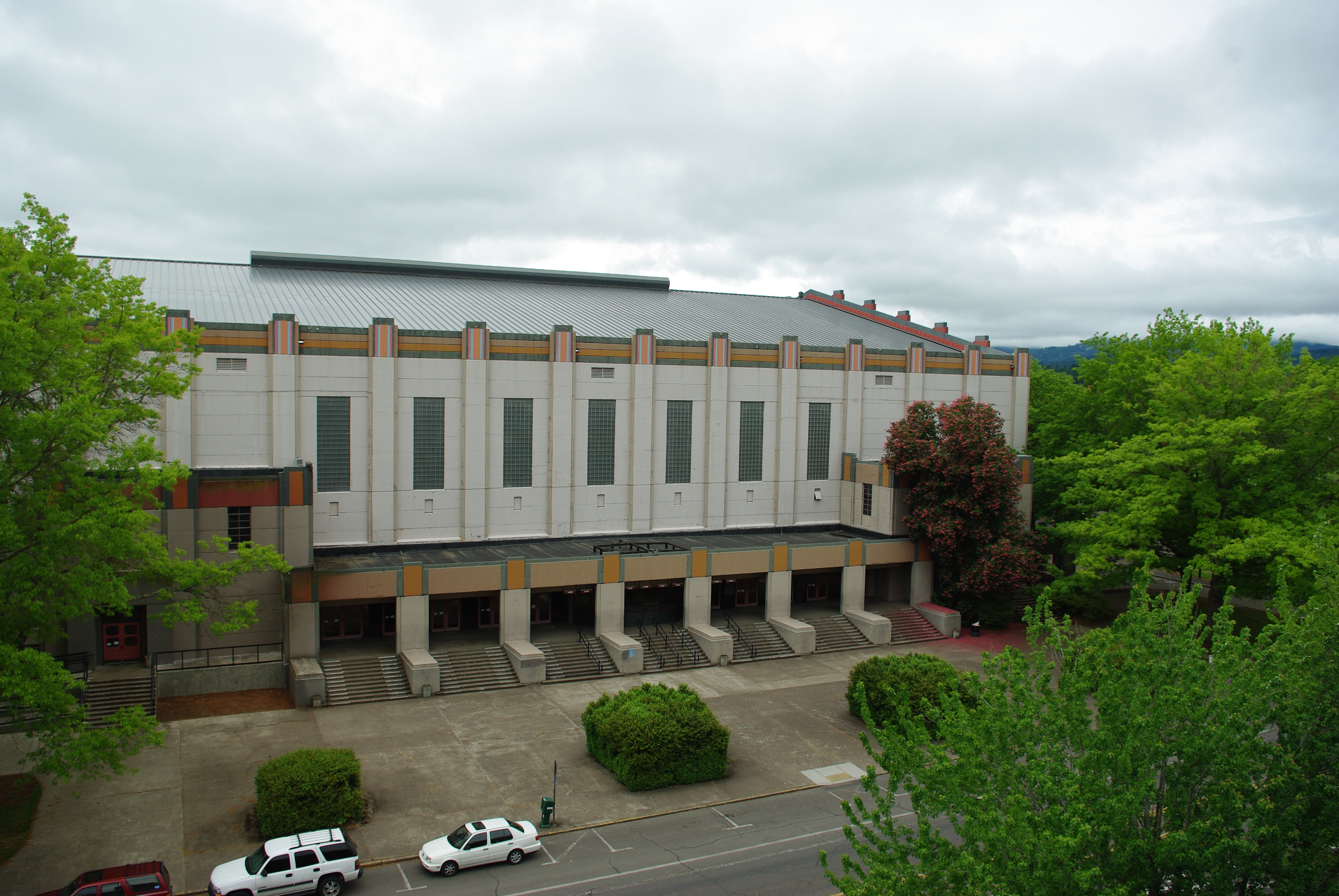
Gill Coliseum at Oregon State University in Corvallis, Oregon, host venue of the 1980 NCAA Division I Wrestling Championships

The 1980 NCAA Division I Wrestling Championships were the 50th NCAA Division I Wrestling Championships to be held. Oregon State University in Corvallis, Oregon hosted the tournament at the Gill Coliseum.

Iowa took home the team championship with 110.75 points and having two individual champions.

Howard Harris of Oregon State received the Gorriaran Award as well as being named the Most Outstanding Wrestler.

== Team results ==
Rank	School	Points
1	Iowa	110.75
2	Oklahoma State	87
3	Iowa State	81.75
4	Oklahoma	67.5
5	Arizona State	56.5
6	Lehigh	56.25
7	Wisconsin	55
8	North Carolina State	37.25
9	Oregon State	23.5
10	Kentucky	24.25

== Individual finals ==
Weight class	Championship match (champion in boldface)
118 lbs	**Joe Gonzales**, Cal State-Bakersfield DEC Dan Glenn, Iowa, 6–3
126 lbs	**John Azevedo**, Cal State-Bakersfield MAJOR Jerry Kelly, Oklahoma State, 17–9
134 lbs	**Randy Lewis**, Iowa MAJOR Darryl Burley, Lehigh, 11–3
142 lbs	**Lee Roy Smith**, Oklahoma State DEC Andre Metzger, Oklahoma, 10–7
150 lbs	**Andy Rein**, Wisconsin DEC Scott Bliss, Oregon, 4–2
158 lbs	**Ricky Stewart**, Oklahoma State DEC William Smith, Morgan State, 11–6
167 lbs	**Matt Reiss**, North Carolina State DEC Perry Hummel, Iowa State, 4–2
177 lbs	**Ed Banach**, Iowa MAJOR Dave Allen, Iowa State, 16–5
190 lbs	**Noel Loban**, Clemson DEC Dan Severn, Arizona State, 4–4, 5–2
UNL	**Howard Harris**, Oregon State WBF Bruce Baumgartner, Indiana State, 4:35
