= Fernando Cavallini =

Italian wrestler

- Born: 17 October 1898
- Died: 13 July 1982 (aged 83)

Fernando Cavallini (17 October 1898 – 13 July 1982) was an Italian wrestler. He competed in the freestyle featherweight event at the 1924 Summer Olympics.
