= Calixte Delmas =

French wrestler

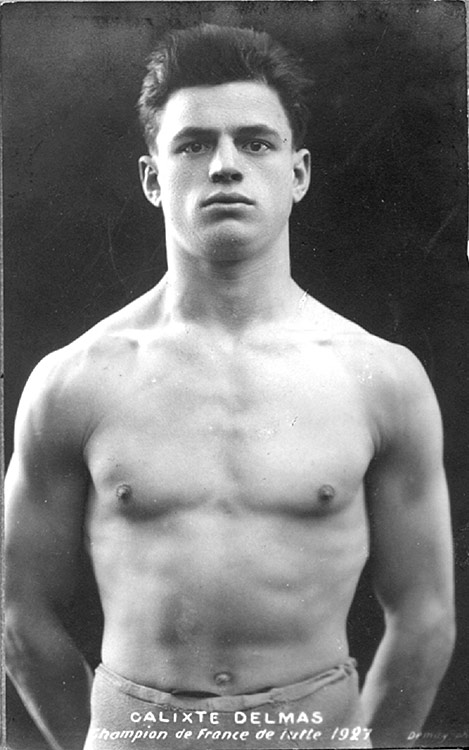
- Delmas in 1927
- Born: 18 January 1906; Perpignan, France
- Died: 5 April 1927 (aged 21); Joinville-le-Pont, France

Calixte Delmas (18 January 1906 – 5 April 1927) was a French wrestler and rugby player. He competed in the freestyle featherweight event at the 1924 Summer Olympics.

In 1922, he was the wrestling champion of Paris and the Greco-Roman vice-champion of France at 15. In 1924 he was the national champion and the youngest participant at the 1924 Olympics in Paris, where he reached the quarter finals.

He died from an accident at the military school in Joinville-le-Pont. He fell from a human pyramid and broke his neck.

There is a statue of him by Raymond Sudre in the Cimetière Sud de Saint-Mandé (South Cemetery of Saint-Mandé, birth date wrong on the statue).
