= Lee Roy Smith =

American wrestler (born 1958)

Lee Roy Smith III
Personal information
- Born: July 27, 1958 (age 68) Del City, Oklahoma, U.S.

Sport
- Country: United States
- Sport: Wrestling
- Events: Freestyle and Folkstyle
- College team: Oklahoma State
- Team: USA
Medal record
Men's freestyle wrestling
Representing the United States
World Championships
Silver medal – second place	1983 Kiev	62 kg
Collegiate Wrestling
Representing the Oklahoma State Cowboys
NCAA Division I Championships
Gold medal – first place	1980 Corvallis	142 lb

Lee Roy Smith III (born July 27, 1958) is an American former folkstyle and freestyle wrestler. He represented the United States in freestyle wrestling at the 1983 World Championships at 62 kg, where he won a silver medal. As a collegiate wrestler, he was a four-time Big 8 Conference champion, three-time NCAA Division I All-American, and the 142-pound 1980 NCAA Division I champion, competing for Oklahoma State.

== Wrestling career ==
=== High School ===
Smith attended Del City High School in Del City, Oklahoma. As a high school wrestler, he won two Oklahoma state championships. He also won two Junior National freestyle wrestling championships.

=== College ===
He attended Oklahoma State University, where he was a four-time Big 8 Conference champion, a three-time NCAA Division I All-American, and the 142-pound NCAA Division I champion in 1980. Smith was also the first Oklahoma State Cowboy wrestler to earn over 100 career wins.

=== Senior level ===
Following his collegiate career, Smith wrestled on the freestyle Senior level circuit. He represented the United States at the 1983 World Championships in freestyle wrestling at 62 kg, where he won a silver medal. He won the 1984 U.S. Olympic Team Trials at his weight class, only to later lose his spot in a protracted court battle. Smith was also a qualifier at the 1988 U.S. Olympic Trials.

== Honors ==
In 2022, Smith was inducted into the Oklahoma Sports Hall of Fame.

In 2026, he was inducted into the National Wrestling Hall of Fame as a Distinguished Member.

== Family ==
Lee Roy is the older brother of John Smith, a two-time Olympic gold medalist and four-time World Champion in freestyle wrestling, and Pat Smith, the first four-time NCAA Division I national champion in collegiate wrestling history. Smith's nephews Mark Perry and Chris Perry are also NCAA Division I wrestling national champions, and his other nephew J. T. Realmuto, is an MLB All-Star catcher for the Philadelphia Phillies.
