= Robin Reed (wrestler) =

Olympic wrestler

Personal information
- Born: October 20, 1899 Pettigrew, Arkansas, U.S.
- Died: December 20, 1978 (aged 79) Salem, Oregon, U.S.
- Home town: Portland, Oregon, U.S.

Sport
- Country: United States
- Sport: Wrestling
- Events: Freestyle and Folkstyle
- College team: Oregon State
- Team: USA
Medal record
Men's freestyle wrestling
Representing the United States
Olympic Games
Gold medal – first place	1924 Paris	61 kg

Robin Reed (October 20, 1899 – December 20, 1978) was an American amateur and professional wrestler, and wrestling coach. Throughout his amateur wrestling career he never lost a wrestling match, official or unofficial, to anyone at any weight class. Reed won a gold medal in freestyle wrestling at the 1924 Summer Olympics. He led Oregon State to its first team national championship, and as a collegiate wrestler, he consistently wrestled in the 170-pound weight division, despite his actual weight being close to 140 pounds. Reed later wrestled professionally and was a World Welterweight Champion.

== Early years ==
=== High school ===
Reed was born in Pettigrew, Arkansas. He grew up in Portland, Oregon and first started wrestling at Portland's Franklin High School, where he took a class on wrestling in order to get out of having to take gym. Reed is quoted as saying, "I needed gymnasium credits to graduate from high school, but I didn't want any gym because I was already getting all the exercise I needed operating an air hammer at the shipyards. I was only 125 pounds and could barely hold onto that air hammer, so I was getting all the gym I needed." He learned wrestling quickly, going undefeated throughout his time in high school.

=== College ===
After high school, Reed attended Oregon State University (then known as Oregon Agricultural College), and won every match he competed in, winning the 125-pound National AAU championship in 1921 and the 135-pound championship in 1922 and 1924 (he didn't win a title in 1923, though he still won every match he competed in). While still a student at Oregon State, he coached the local Corvallis High School wrestling team to win the Oregon state championship.

== Olympics ==
While still attending Oregon State, Reed participated in the Pacific Northwest Olympic team trials. He entered the 145.5, 158.5, 174.0, and 192.0 pound weight classes, winning at each weight class. At the Olympics, he entered the 134.5 pound weight class (the second lowest) and pinned all of his opponents, including fellow Oregon State teammate Chester Newton in the finals. It was widely established that Reed had the ability to pin every member of U.S. Olympic team, including team members who won gold at 191 pounds and heavyweight.

Prior to the 1924 Olympic competition, Reed was hitch-hiking from his home in Oregon to New York City, in route to join the U.S. Olympic team. Reed stopped at Iowa State University and asked the coach if he could work out when it came time practice. When the coach refused, Reed asked if he first pinned every member of the wrestling team, could he then work out with the team. The coach agreed, and Reed proceeded to pin each Iowa State wrestler prior to practice and earned his workout. At the 1924 Paris Olympics, Reed who only weighed around 135 lbs., bet he could pin Harry Steel, the American heavyweight gold medalist, and did so five times within fifteen minutes. It is widely believed that if the rules had permitted it, Reed could have won the gold medal in every weight class.

== Post-Olympics ==
=== Coaching and professional wrestling ===
Upon his return from the Olympics, Reed retired from his amateur wrestling career having never lost a match, a feat matched only by Japan's Osamu Watanabe. While still a student, he became coach of the Oregon State wrestling team, and led them to win the national AAU championship in 1926, Oregon State's first team national championship in any sport.

In late 1926, he began competing on the professional wrestling circuit, a career he would follow for 10 years. He trained with other feared wrestlers such as Martin Burns and John Pesek, who helped refine his submission skills. He notably lost against Pesek in a private workout match. Reed reportedly took Pesek down before Pesek overwhelmed Reed with his larger size and aggressive catch wrestling skills. Reed's greatest accomplishment in pro wrestling was winning the World Welterweight Championship.

=== Later life ===
In 1936, he went into the real estate business following his career in professional wrestling. In December 1936, Reed survived a suicide attempt following a lawsuit from his ex-wife. Reed resided off the Oregon coast the remainder of his life. In 1971, Reed finished up his college degree at the age of 72. He died in 1978 at the age of 79.

He was inducted into the National Wrestling Hall of Fame as a Distinguished Member in 1978, the Oregon Sports Hall of Fame inaugural class in 1980, and the Oregon State University Athletics Hall of Fame in 1988.
