= Cliff Chilcott =

Canadian wrestler (1898–1970)

Clifford Chilcott
- Born: 28 June 1898; Blackpool, England
- Died: 18 July 1970 (aged 72); Toronto, Canada

Cliff Chilcott
Medal record

Men's Freestyle wrestling

Representing Canada

British Empire Games
Gold medal – first place	1930 Hamilton	Featherweight

Clifford "Cliff" Chilcott (28 June 1898 – 18 July 1970) was a Canadian freestyle sport wrestler who competed in the 1924 Summer Olympics.

In 1924 he finished fourth in the freestyle featherweight tournament. At the 1930 British Empire Games, he won the gold medal in the featherweight class.
