= Claude Angelo =

Australian wrestler

- Born: 11 November 1894; Collingwood, Victoria, Australia
- Died: 6 August 1981 (aged 86); Macclesfield, Victoria, Australia

Claude Angelo (11 November 1894 – 6 August 1981) was an Australian wrestler. He competed in the freestyle featherweight event at the 1924 Summer Olympics.
