= Edvard Huupponen =

Finnish wrestler (1898–1977)

- Born: 1 December 1898; Ruokolahti, Viipuri Province, Grand Duchy of Finland
- Died: 4 January 1977 (aged 78); Mikkeli, Finland

Edvard Huupponen (1 December 1898 – 4 January 1977) was a Finnish wrestler. He competed in the freestyle featherweight event at the 1924 Summer Olympics.
