= Chester Newton =

American wrestler

Personal information
- Born: September 18, 1903 Canby, Oregon, U.S.
- Died: May 11, 1966 (aged 62) Oregon City, Oregon, U.S.

Sport
- Country: United States
- Sport: Wrestling
- Events: Freestyle and Folkstyle
- College team: Oregon State
- Team: USA
Medal record
Men's freestyle wrestling
Representing the United States
Olympic Games
Silver medal – second place	1924 Paris	61 kg

Chester Willard "Chet" Newton (September 18, 1903 – May 11, 1966) was an Olympic wrestler for the United States. He won a silver medal in the featherweight division at the 1924 Summer Olympics in Paris, France, losing only to fellow Oregon State University alumnus and teammate Robin Reed in the finals. Reed was also the only man to defeat Newton at the Olympic Trials in New York.

While at Oregon State, Newton was also a member of Sigma Pi fraternity and the cross country team. When his eligibility for collegiate wrestling ended he became a wrestling coach for the college. After graduation he became a teacher in Tillamook, Oregon.

He was elected to the Oregon Sports Hall of Fame in 1980 and to the Oregon State University Athletic Hall of Fame in 1991.

He died in a car accident in Oregon City, Oregon in 1966, at the age of 62.
