= Nils Nilsson (wrestler) =

Swedish wrestler

- Born: 7 January 1899; Oslo, Norway
- Died: 18 July 1961 (aged 62); Malmö, Sweden

Nils Nilsson (7 January 1899 – 18 July 1961) was a Swedish wrestler. He competed in the freestyle featherweight event at the 1924 Summer Olympics.
