= Maurice Guinard =

French wrestler

- Born: 1902

Maurice Guinard (born 1902, date of death unknown) was a French wrestler. He competed in the freestyle featherweight event at the 1924 Summer Olympics.
