= Arthur Foubert =

Belgian wrestler

- Born: 12 February 1903

Arthur Foubert (born 12 February 1903, date of death unknown) was a Belgian wrestler. He competed in the freestyle featherweight event at the 1924 Summer Olympics.
