= Greg Strobel =

American wrestler and coach (1952–2020)

Personal information
- Born: August 17, 1952 Terry, Montana, U.S.
- Died: October 8, 2020 (aged 68) Villas, New Jersey, U.S.
- Home town: Scappoose, Oregon, U.S.
- Education: Oregon State University
Medal record
Collegiate Wrestling
Representing the Oregon State Beavers
NCAA Division I Championships
Gold medal – first place	1973 Seattle	190 lb
Gold medal – first place	1974 Ames	190 lb

Greg Strobel (August 17, 1952 – October 8, 2020) was an American wrestler, coach, and member of the National Wrestling Hall of Fame from Scappoose, Oregon. From 1995 to 2008, he was the head coach at Lehigh University in Bethlehem, Pennsylvania, one of the top collegiate wrestling programs in the country.

Strobel won two NCAA titles and was a three-time All-American at Oregon State, finishing his college career with a 126-8-1 record before starting his coaching career. He was an assistant coach at Oregon State University, a head high school coach at Roseburg High School, a US Wrestling official and a private club coach before taking the head coaching job at Lehigh in 1995, where he held an endowed chair: the Lawrence White Head Coach of Wrestling. He led Lehigh to five consecutive EIWA championships and multiple Top-Ten NCAA championship finishes. He coached two national champions.

He was inducted into the National Wrestling Hall of Fame in 2012, the Oregon State University Sports Hall of Fame in 1993, and the Oregon Sports Hall of Fame in 2016. Strobel died on October 8, 2020, at the age of 68.
