= Wrestling at the 1924 Summer Olympics – Men's freestyle featherweight =

Men's featherweight freestyle wrestling at the Games of the VIII Olympiad
- Venue: Vélodrome d'Hiver
- Dates: July 12–14, 1924
- Competitors: 17 from 12 nations

Medalists
1st place, gold medalist(s)		Robin Reed	United States
2nd place, silver medalist(s)		Chester Newton	United States
3rd place, bronze medalist(s)		Katsutoshi Naito	Japan

The men's freestyle featherweight was a freestyle wrestling event held as part of the Wrestling at the 1924 Summer Olympics programme. It was the fourth appearance of the event. Featherweight was the second-lightest category, including wrestlers weighing from 56 kilograms to 61 kilograms.

== Results ==
Source: Official results; Wudarski

=== Gold medal round ===
Round of 32
Edvard Huupponen (FIN)	W
Maurice Guinard (FRA)	L

Round of 16
Edvard Huupponen (FIN)	W
August Thys (BEL)	L
Calixte Delmas (FRA)	W
Nils Nilsson (SWE)	L
Chester Newton (USA)	W
Hans Hansson (SWE)	L
Rasmus Torgensen (DEN)	W
George MacKenzie (GBR)	L
Clifford Chilcott (CAN)	W
Fernando Cavallini (ITA)	L
Claude Angelo (AUS)	W
George Stott (GBR)	L
Robin Reed (USA)	W
Anton Koolmann (EST)	L
Katsutoshi Naito (JPN)	W
Arthur Foubert (BEL)	L

Quarterfinals
Edvard Huupponen (FIN)	W
Charles Delmas (FRA)	L
Chester Newton (USA)	W
Rasmus Torgensen (DEN)	L
Clifford Chilcott (CAN)	W
Claude Angelo (AUS)	L
Robin Reed (USA)	W
Katsutoshi Naito (JPN)	L

Semifinals
Edvard Huupponen (FIN)	L
Chester Newton (USA)	W
Clifford Chilcott (CAN)	L
Robin Reed (USA)	W

Final
Chester Newton (USA)	L
Robin Reed (USA)	W

=== Silver medal round ===
Semifinals		Final
Chester Newton (USA)	W
Anton Koolmann (EST)	L	Chester Newton (USA)	W
Katsutoshi Naito (JPN)	W	Katsutoshi Naito (JPN)	L
Clifford Chilcott (CAN)	L

=== Bronze medal round ===
Semifinals		Final
Katsutoshi Naito (JPN)	W
Edvard Huupponen (FIN)	L	Katsutoshi Naito (JPN)	W
Hans Hansson (SWE)	W	Hans Hansson (SWE)	L
Rasmus Torgensen (DEN)	L
