= Benny Beaver =

Mascot for Oregon State University

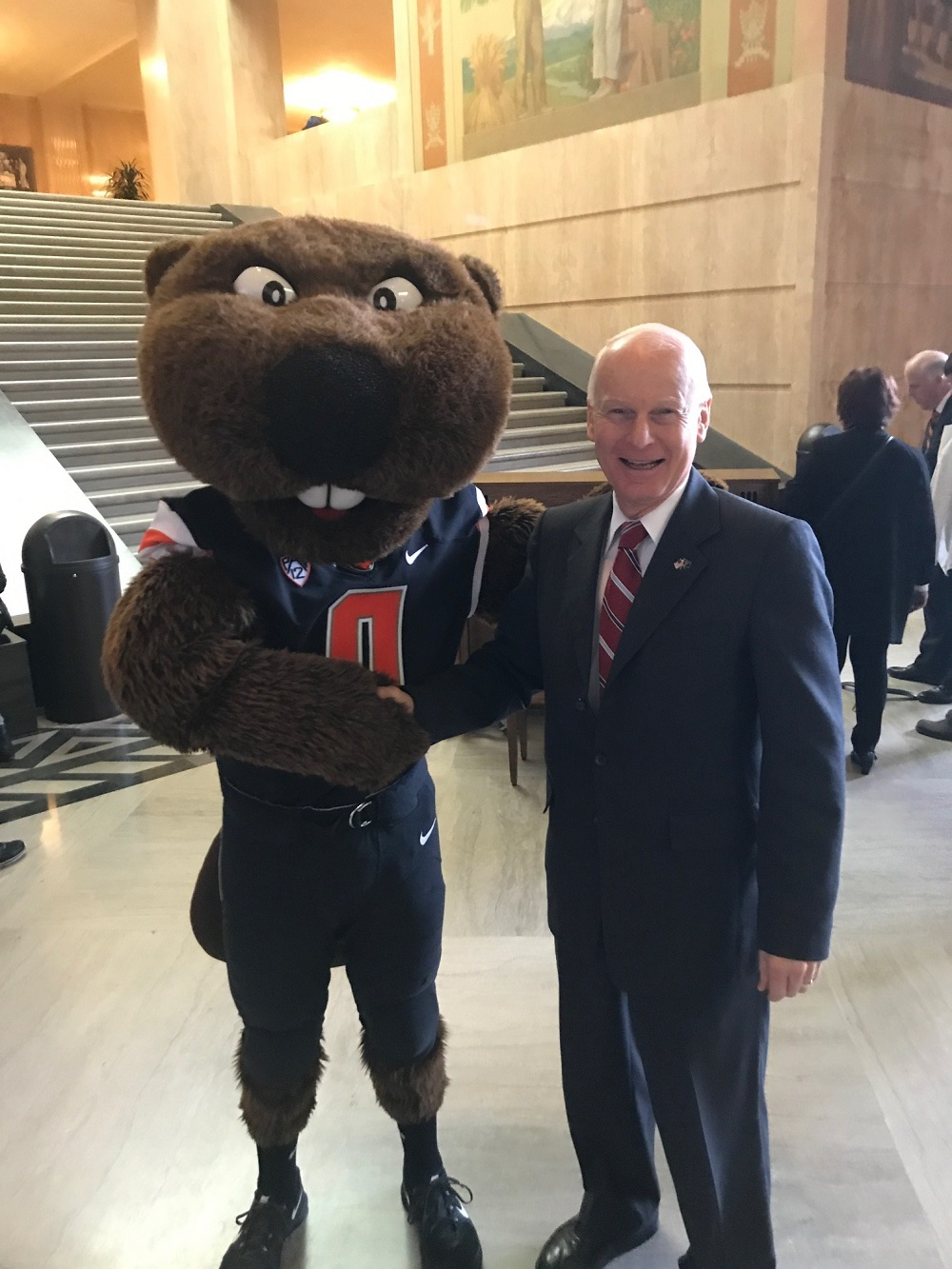
- Benny Beaver with the Oregon Secretary of State in 2017
- University: Oregon State University
- Conference: Pac-12
- Description: Beaver: Aquatic mammal
- Origin of name: Oregon's important economic catalyst at the turn of the 19th century
- First seen: 1942
- Related mascot(s): Bernice Beaver

Benny Beaver is the official mascot of Oregon State University and winner of the 2011 Capital One Mascot of the Year write-in campaign. The date of the first use of the beaver as the university's mascot is unknown, but photographs in the school's yearbook document its use as a mascot as early as the 1940s. The campus newspaper was one of the first documented university entities to use the beaver as a name, starting in 1896.

== Etymology ==
The beaver has always been a popular animal in Oregon, but it was even more popular in Europe and the Eastern United States in past centuries. Wealthy residents of the two regions dressed in fashionable beaver fur long before European explorers discovered Oregon. By the late 1700s, the beaver trade was already a major global industry. Beaver fur top hats were popular attire for the North American and European upper class.

At the turn of the 19th century, the newly explored American Northwest was found to be plentiful with beavers. As a territory, Oregon grew into a global supplier. When Oregon became a state, it coined itself "The Beaver State" due to the beaver's historic importance as an economic catalyst for the region and, similar to the California "Gold Rush", helping to attract thousands of early pioneers and homesteaders. The beaver now appears on the back of the state flag and is recognized as the official state animal.

== Mascot history ==
Prior to the beaver, Oregon State had several other mascots. Their first one was "Jimmie" the Coyote, who was the school's mascot from 1892 to 1893. Afterward, the mascot became "Doc" Bell from 1893 to 1928, a longtime member of the university's board of regents. Bell became hugely popular among the students for his ritual of marching to the Marys River after each of Oregon State's victories over Oregon and tossing his hat into the water as a token of celebration.

In 1916, shortly after the university's school newspaper named itself the "Beaver", the university's yearbook took the name. The continued use of the name, mostly by the yearbook, eventually solidified the beaver as the university's official mascot. The popularity of the beaver was also shared by students at University of Oregon. For several early publishings, students at this school also used "The Beaver" as their yearbook's title.

Oregon State University's first documented use of "Benny Beaver" was found in a photograph showing students posing next to a statue of a beaver inscribed with the name "Benny Beaver." The photograph appears in the 1942 edition of the yearbook.

During the 1940s, students carted a beaver statue in parades throughout the state and around the stadium on game days. The statue was patterned after an earlier bronze statue that also went by the name "Benny." Although the name "Benny" was adopted prior to the 1940s, a 1941 yearbook picture captions the statue as "Bill Beaver". The following yearbook (1942) a photo of the same beaver statue is cited with the name "Benny Beaver". After the statue's demise, the name "Benny" was regularly used in a popular sports column in The Daily Barometer - known as "The Gnawed Log."

The early Benny Beaver "cartoon" icon/logo was created by famous graphic illustrator, and former Disney employee, Arthur C. Evans. As the art director for Angelus Pacific Company, Evans submitted his design to OSU and it was approved for use in 1951. His logos were used at hundreds of other universities and high schools throughout the nation. Evans' beaver logo also appeared in the 1985 movie Teen Wolf.

The first live appearance during an athletic event by a mascot named "Benny", was September 18, 1952 and performed by Ken Austin. Austin later founded Newberg, Oregon-based A-dec, the largest privately held dental equipment manufacturer in North America. Austin is now a major Oregon State donor.

Between the early 1980s and mid-1990s, Benny was often joined at sporting events by a co-mascot, known as "Bernice Beaver."

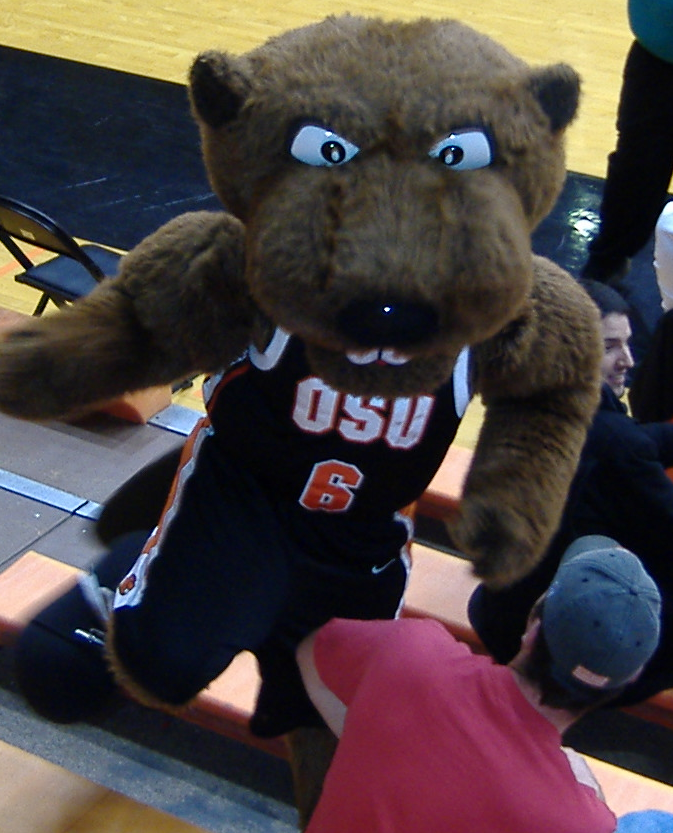
Benny Beaver at a home game in Gill Coliseum in 2006

In 1998 No Dinx, a graphic design shop in Albany, Oregon, redesigned the logo for the first time in nearly 50 years. In March 2013, working together with Nike, Oregon State University unveiled the latest, newly redesigned version, of the Benny Beaver logo. The new logo replaced the No Dinx design. The Benny Beaver costume also changed to match the new logo in 2001. Benny wears #0 at football games and #0 at basketball games. Past numbers have included #100 (football) and #6 (basketball).

In December 2010, Benny Beaver was ranked 13th on a list titled 20 Worst Behaved Mascots Of All Time. Despite the bad press, Benny Beaver won the 2011 Capital One Mascot of the Year write-in campaign, earning the mascot program $1000 and inclusion in the following year's Capital One All-America Mascot Team.

During the halftime show of Oregon State Football's last home game of the 2024 season, Benny became engaged with his longtime love interest, Bernice Beaver. Since the game was being played against the Washington State Cougars, Butch T. Cougar, Washington State University's mascot, helped Benny with his proposal.
