= Dale O. Thomas =

American wrestler and coach (1923–2004)

Personal information
- Born: February 26, 1923 Cedar Rapids, Iowa, U.S.
- Died: March 4, 2004 (aged 81) Corvallis, Oregon, U.S.

Sport
- Country: United States
- Sport: Wrestling
- Events: Greco-Roman, Freestyle, and Folkstyle
- College team: Cornell College (Iowa)
- Team: USA
Medal record
Collegiate Wrestling
Representing Cornell College
NCAA Championships
Bronze medal – third place	1947 Champaign	175 lb

Dale O. Thomas (February 26, 1923 – March 4, 2004) was the head coach of the Oregon State wrestling team at Oregon State University from 1957 to 1990, and is a National Wrestling Hall of Fame member. He competed in the men's Greco-Roman light heavyweight at the 1956 Summer Olympics. He died of kidney and liver failure due to complications from primary sclerosing cholangitis at the age of 81.

== College career ==
Thomas won nine national titles in collegiate freestyle and Greco-Roman wrestling during his college career, including the 1943 and 1947 NAAU Championship at 175 lbs. He wrestled for the historic 1947 Cornell College team, coached by Paul Scott, that won both the NCAA and NAAU championships.

== Coaching career ==
Thomas was head coach for the Beavers from 1957 to 1990, earning 22 conference titles and having coached 10 individual NCAA champions, 116 conference champions, and 60 All Americans. His coaching dual meet record is 616–168–13, the 616 wins being an NCAA record for most dual meet wins in a coaching career, held for nearly 20 years following his death. He led the Beavers to finish in the NCAA top 10 on 14 occasions. He was also named NCAA Coach of the Year twice (1961 and 1970), and Pac-10 Coach of the Year four times.

== Other accomplishments ==
- Brought the NCAA championships to the West Coast for the first time in 1961, with Oregon State serving as the host school
- Served as a wrestling referee in the 1960 and 1964 Summer Olympics
- Elected to the Cornell College of Iowa Sports Hall of Fame in 1970
- Elected to the National Wrestling Hall of Fame in 1980
- Elected to the State of Iowa Hall of Fame in 1982
- Elected to the Oregon State University Sports Hall of Fame in 1992
- Elected to the Oregon Sports Hall of Fame
- Elected to the Helms Foundation Hall of Fame
- Elected to the Iowa Wrestling Hall of Fame
- Winningest college coach of all time (616 wins)
- Featured in the March 6th 1989 issue of Sports Illustrated Faces In The Crowd

== Notes ==
1. Dale Thomas Memorial Service Scheduled for 1 p.m. Sunday
