= Oregon State Beavers wrestling =

American collegiate wrestling program

Oregon State Beavers
- University: Oregon State University
- Head coach: Chris Pendleton (4th Season season)
- Conference: Pac-12
- Location: Corvallis, OR
- Arena: Gill Coliseum (capacity: 9,604)
- Nickname: Beavers
- Colors: Orange and black

Team national championships
- 1926

NCAA individual champions
- 12

All-Americans
- 102

Conference championships
- 1909, 1910, 1913, 1915, 1916, 1917, 1918, 1919, 1920, 1921, 1922, 1923, 1924, 1925, 1926, 1941, 1942, 1948, 1950, 1955, 1956, 1957, 1959, 1960, 1961, 1962, 1963, 1964, 1965, 1966, 1967, 1968, 1969, 1970, 1971, 1972, 1973, 1976, 1977, 1978, 1979, 1983, 1984, 1992, 1994, 2007, 2010, 2012, 2013, 2014, 2015, 2016, 2023, 2025, 2026

The Oregon State Beavers wrestling program was established in 1909. Traditionally a nationally prominent team, the Beavers won the Amateur Athletic Union national championship in 1926 (Oregon State's first national championship in any sport) and have won their conference championship over 50 times. The team has produced 99 All-Americans, 12 individual national champions, is associated with five National Wrestling Hall of Fame members, and has had wrestlers represent their nations at the olympic games on ten different occasions. The team has finished their season ranked in the NCAA top 25 on 46 occasions, including finishing 21 seasons in the top 10 and two seasons as national runners-up.

Chris Pendleton (Oklahoma State) is the head coach. In his four years at Oregon State, he coached six All-Americans, won one Pac-12 Championship, and compiled a 27-20-0 record while coaching the team to two top 25 finishes.

== Dan Hodge Trophy Winners ==
The Dan Hodge Trophy has been awarded to the nation's top wrestler each season since 1995.

- 1996 - Les Gutches

== National Wrestling Hall of Fame members ==
OSU is associated with six members of the National Wrestling Hall of Fame.

- Robin Reed - Inducted 1978 (wrestler and coach for OSU)
- Dale Thomas - Inducted 1980 (coach for OSU)
- Jim Zalesky - Inducted 2004 (coach for OSU)
- Les Gutches - Inducted 2009 (wrestler for OSU)
- Greg Strobel - Inducted 2012 (wrestler for OSU)
- Jeff Smith - Inducted 2024 (wrestler for OSU and volunteer coach for the Sisters School District, Sisters, Oregon)

== Oregon Sports Hall of Fame members ==
Oregon State Wrestling is associated with seven members of the Oregon Sports Hall of Fame.

- Chester Newton - Inducted 1980
- Robin Reed - Inducted 1980
- Jess Lewis - Inducted 1981
- Ron Finley - Inducted 1982
- Dale Thomas - Inducted 1991
- Les Gutches - Inducted 2011
- Lucas Chinn - Inducted 2019

== Individual National Champions ==
The Oregon State Beavers wrestling program has had 12 individual national champions.

- 1961 - Don Conway (167 pounds)
- 1969 - Jess Lewis (Heavyweight)
- 1970 - Jess Lewis (Heavyweight)
- 1971 - Roger Weigel (134 pounds)
- 1973 - Greg Strobel (190 pounds)
- 1974 - Greg Strobel (190 pounds)
- 1975 - Larry Bielenberg (Heavyweight)
- 1978 - Dan Hicks (142 pounds)
- 1979 - Dan Hicks (142 pounds)
- 1980 - Howard Harris (Heavyweight)
- 1995 - Les Gutches (177 pounds)
- 1996 - Les Gutches (177 pounds)

== All-Americans ==
- 1952 - John Witte (Heavyweight)
- 1957 - John Dustin (177 pounds)
- 1958 - John Dustin (177 pounds)
- 1960 - Mits Tamura (115 pounds)
- 1961 - Don Conway (167 pounds), Ron Finley (137 pounds)
- 1964 - Len Kauffman (167 pounds)
- 1965 - Len Kauffman (167 pounds)
- 1966 - Ron Iwasaki (115 pounds)
- 1967 - Jeff Smith (167 pounds), Ron Iwasaki (115 pounds)
- 1968 - Jess Lewis (Heavyweight)
- 1969 - Jess Lewis (Heavyweight), Phil Frey (145 pounds), Jim Vandehey (167 pounds), Bob Hawkins (137 pounds), Kim Snider (152 pounds)
- 1970 - Jess Lewis (Heavyweight), Jim Crumley (177 pounds), Roger Weigel (126 pounds), Bob Tomasovic (150 pounds), Jim Vandehey (167 pounds), Kim Snider (158 pounds)
- 1971 - Roger Weigel (134 pounds), Mike R. Jones (158 pounds), Jim Crumley (177 pounds)
- 1972 - Tom Phillips (118 pounds), Greg Strobel (190 pounds), Jim Hagen (Heavyweight)
- 1973 - Greg Strobel (190 pounds), Tom Phillips (118 pounds), Mike R. Jones (158 pounds), Jim Hagen (Heavyweight), Jim Crumley (177 pounds)
- 1974 - Greg Strobel (190 pounds), Gordan Iiams (142 pounds), Larry Bielenberg (Heavyweight)
- 1975 - Larry Bielenberg (Heavyweight), Doug Ziebart (150 pounds)
- 1976 - Larry Bielenberg (Heavyweight)
- 1977 - Larry Bielenberg (Heavyweight), Dick Knorr (142 pounds), Pat Plourd (118 Pounds), Marty Ryan (177 pounds), Howard Harris (190 pounds)
- 1978 - Dan Hicks (142 pounds), Howard Harris (190 pounds)
- 1979 - Dan Hicks (142 pounds), Dick Knorr (150 pounds), Howard Harris (190 pounds), Mark Evenhus (158 pounds), Mike Bauer (126 pounds)
- 1980 - Howard Harris (Heavyweight), Mike Bauer (134 pounds)
- 1981 - Marty Ryan (177 pounds), Brad Swartz (150 pounds)
- 1983 - Jim Baumgardner (190 pounds)
- 1984 - Jim Baumgardner (190 pounds)
- 1986 - Jeff Cardwell (150 pounds)
- 1987 - Jeff Cardwell (158 pounds)
- 1988 - Dave Orndorff (Heavyweight)
- 1991 - Babak Mohammadi (126 pounds)
- 1992 - Babak Mohammadi (126 pounds), Trent Flack (167 pounds)
- 1993 - Trent Flack (167 pounds), Dave Nieradka (126 pounds)
- 1994 - Babak Mohammadi (134 pounds), Dan Alar (158 pounds), Les Gutches (177 pounds), Dave Nieradka (126 pounds)
- 1995 - Les Gutches (177 pounds), Babak Mohammadi (134 pounds), Glenn Nieradka (126 pounds), Chad Renner (167 pounds)
- 1996 - Les Gutches (177 pounds), Oscar Wood (134 pounds)
- 1998 - Oscar Wood (142 pounds), Jason Buce (126 pounds)
- 1999 - Mat Orndorff (Heavyweight)
- 2001 - Eric Jorgensen (157 pounds)
- 2002 - Nathan Coy (174 pounds)
- 2007 - Ty Watterson (Heavyweight)
- 2009 - Heinrich Barnes (149 pounds)
- 2011 - Colby Covington (174 pounds)
- 2012 - Clayton Jack (Heavyweight), Michael Mangrum (141 pounds), Scott Sakaguchi (149 pounds)
- 2013 - Taylor Meeks (197 pounds), Scott Sakaguchi (149 pounds), RJ Pena (157 pounds)
- 2016 - Amarveer Dhesi (Heavyweight)
- 2018 - Amarveer Dhesi (Heavyweight), Ronnie Bresser (125 pounds)
- 2019 - Amarveer Dhesi (Heavyweight), Ronnie Bresser (125 pounds)
- 2022 - Grant Willits (141 pounds), Hunter Willits (157 pounds), Brandon Kaylor (125 pounds), Devan Turner (133 pounds)
- 2023 - Trey Munoz (184 pounds)
- 2024 - Trey Munoz (184 pounds)
- 2025 - Ethan Stiles (149 pounds)

== Olympians ==
Oregon State wrestlers in the Olympics
Year	Name	Country	Style	Weight Class	Place
1924 Paris	Chester Newton	United States	Freestyle	61 kg	Silver
1924 Paris	Robin Reed	United States	Freestyle	61 kg	Gold
1960 Rome	Fritz Fivian	United States	Greco-Roman	73 kg	20th
1964 Tokyo	Ronald Finley	United States	Greco-Roman	63 kg	4th
1968 Mexico City	Jess Lewis	United States	Freestyle	97 kg	6th
1968 Mexico City	Henk Schenk	United States	Greco-Roman	97 kg	DNP
1972 Munich	Henk Schenk	United States	Freestyle	100 kg	DNP
1996 Atlanta	Les Gutches	United States	Freestyle	82 kg	7th
2004 Athens	Oscar Wood	United States	Greco-Roman	66 kg	12th
2008 Beijing	Heinrich Barnes	South Africa	Freestyle	66 kg	19th
2020 Tokyo	Amar Dhesi	Canada	Freestyle	125 kg	13th
2024 Paris	Amar Dhesi	Canada	Freestyle	125 kg	9th
