= Émile Munhofen =

Luxembourgish gymnast (1898–1983)

Émile Munhoven
- Born: 18 August 1898 Esch-sur-Alzette, Luxembourg
- Died: 28 July 1983 (aged 84) Esch-sur-Alzette, Luxembourg

Gymnastics career
- Discipline: Men's artistic gymnastics
- Country represented: Luxembourg

Émile Munhoven (18 August 1898 – 28 July 1983) was a Luxembourgish gymnast. He competed in nine events at the 1924 Summer Olympics.
