= Mathias Weishaupt =

Luxembourgish gymnast (1899–1975)

- Born: 13 May 1899 Luxembourg City, Luxembourg
- Died: 14 February 1975 (aged 75) Luxembourg City, Luxembourg

Gymnastics career
- Discipline: Men's artistic gymnastics
- Country represented: Luxembourg

Mathias Weishaupt (13 May 1899 – 14 February 1975) was a Luxembourgish gymnast. He competed in nine events at the 1924 Summer Olympics.
