= Pierre Tolar =

Luxembourgish gymnast

- Born: 1898
- Died: 10 February 1927 (aged 28–29) Esch-Alzette, Luxembourg

Gymnastics career
- Discipline: Men's artistic gymnastics
- Country represented: Luxembourg
- Gym: La Fraternelle

Pierre Tolar (1898 - 10 February 1927) was a Luxembourgish gymnast. He competed in nine events at the 1924 Summer Olympics.
