= Estonia at the 1924 Summer Olympics =

- IOC code: EST
- NOC: Estonian Olympic Committee

in Paris
- Competitors: 44 (men) in 5 sports
- Flag bearer: Jüri Lossmann
- Medals Ranked 17th: Gold 1 Silver 1 Bronze 4 Total 6

Summer Olympics appearances (overview)
- 1920; 1924; 1928; 1932; 1936; 1948–1988; 1992; 1996; 2000; 2004; 2008; 2012; 2016; 2020; 2024; 2028

Other related appearances
- Russian Empire (1908–1912); Soviet Union (1952–1988)

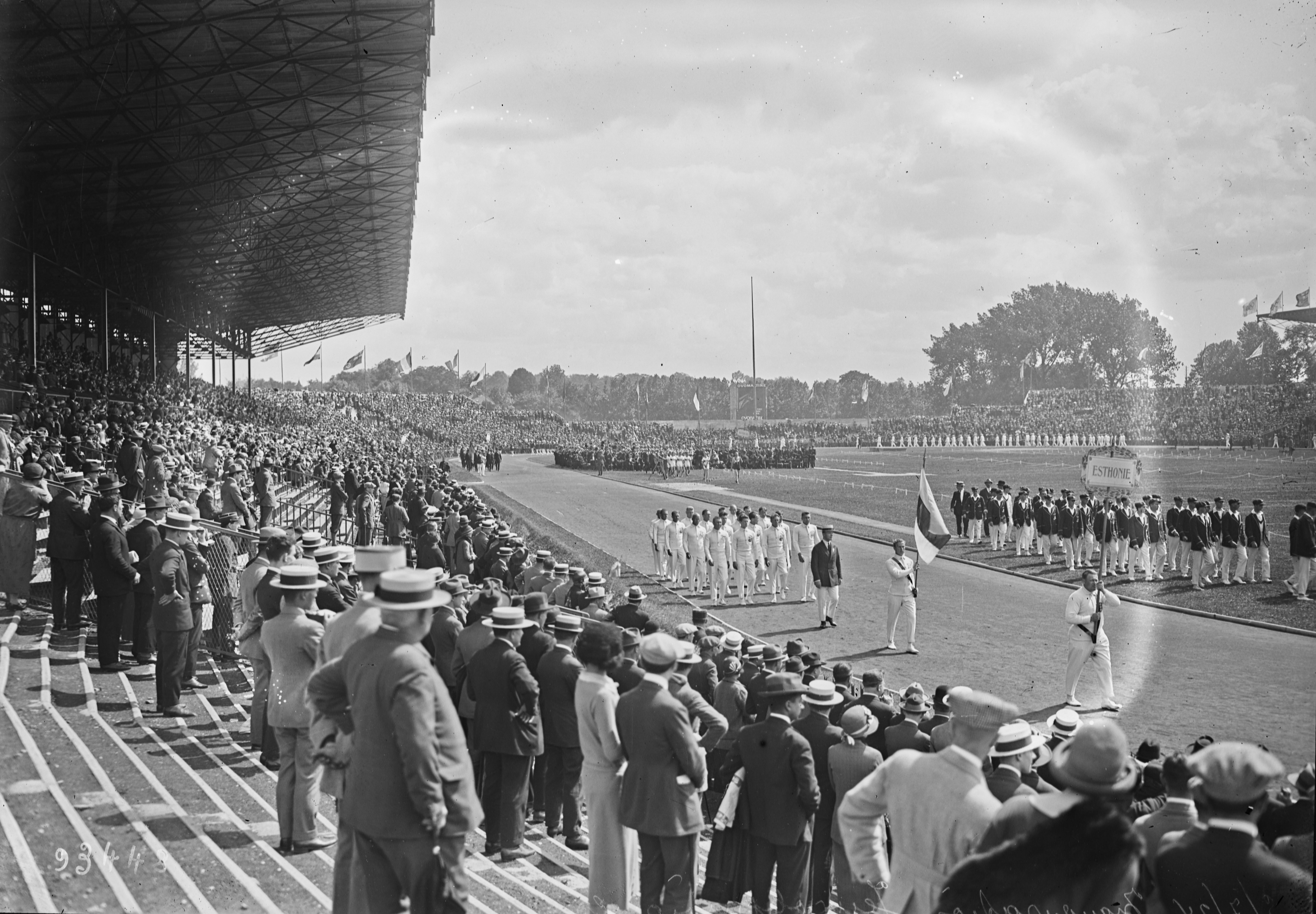
The team and flag of Estonia at the opening ceremony of 1924 Summer Olympics in Paris

Estonia competed at the 1924 Summer Olympics in Paris, France.

== Medalists ==
Medal	Name	Sport	Event	Date
Gold	Eduard Pütsep	Wrestling	Men's Greco-Roman bantamweight	July 10
Silver	Alfred Neuland	Weightlifting	Men's 75 kg	July 23
Bronze	Aleksander Klumberg	Athletics	Men's decathlon	July 12
Bronze	Jaan Kikkas	Weightlifting	Men's 75 kg	July 23
Bronze	Harald Tammer	Weightlifting	Men's +82.5 kg	July 23
Bronze	Roman Steinberg	Wrestling	Men's Greco-Roman middleweight	July 10

== The 1924 Estonian Olympic Team ==
Representatives

Estonian team representatives were delegation heads Leopold Tõnson and Johannes Junkur; Johannes Kauba in athletics, Johannes Villemson in wrestling, William Fiskar and Aleksander Lugenberg-Mändvere in football.

Other delegations

Ethnic Estonians in other delegations were for Latvia Juhan Oja in athletics – men's 100 and 200 metres and Rudolf Rone (lv: Rūdolfs Ronis) in wrestling – men's Greco-Roman lightweight.

== Results by event ==
=== Athletics ===
Men's 100 metres

- Reinhold Kesküll – Round 1 Heat 13: 5th 11,5 (→ dnq)
- Herbert Küttim – Round 1 Heat 1: (→ dns)
- Juhan Oja – competed for Latvia – Round 1 Heat 5: 2nd 11,2; Round 2 Heat 3: 5th 11,2 (→ dnq)

Men's 200 metres

- Reinhold Kesküll – Round 1 Heat 16: 3rd 24,0 (→ dnq)
- Herbert Küttim – Round 1 Heat 7: (→ dns)
- Juhan Oja – competed for Latvia – Round 1 Heat 17: 2nd 23,8; Round 2 Heat 1: 4th 23,1 (→ dnq)

Men's 400 metres

- Reinhold Kesküll – Round 1 Heat 2: 4th 53,2 (→ dnq)
- Herbert Küttim – Round 1 Heat 3: (→ dns)

Men's 800 metres

- Johannes Villemson – Round 1 Heat 8: (→ dns)

Men's 1500 metres

- Aleksander Antson – Round 1 Heat 5: 5th (→ dnq)
- Johannes Villemson – Round 1 Heat 2: (→ dns)

Men's marathon

- Jüri Lossman – Final –: 2:57.54,6 (→ 10. place)
- Elmar Reiman – Final – 3:40.52,0 (→ finished last, 30. place)

Men's 3000 metre steeplechase

- Aleksander Antson – Round 1 Heat 1: (→ dns)

Men's high jump

- Valter Ever – Qualification round Group 1: 1.75m (→ dns?, 15.- 18. place)

Men's long jump

- Valter Ever – Qualification round Group 1: 6th 6.585m (→ dnq, 19. place)

Men's pole vault

- Valter Ever – Qualification round Group 2: 9th–11th 3.20 (→ dnq, 15.- 20. place)

Men's shot put

- Harald Tammer – Qualification round Group 1: 5th 13.28m (→ 12. place)

Men's discus throw

- Gustav Kalkun – Qualification round Group 2: 5th 38.46m (→ 15. place)

Men's javelin throw

- Aleksander Klumberg – Qualification round Group 2: 9th 49.61m (→ 17. place);

Men's decathlon

- Aleksander Klumberg – Final: (100 m – 11,6s; long jump – 6,96m; shot put – 12.27m; high jump – 1,75m; 400 m – 54,4s; 100 m hurdles – 17,6s; discus throw – 36.795m; pole vault – 3.30m; javelin throw – 57.70m; 1,500 m – 5.16,0) Total points: 7329,360p. (→ Bronze Medal)
- Eugen Neumann – Final: (100 m – 11,8; long jump – 6.49m; shot put – 9.63m; high jump – 1.65m; 400 m – 55,4s; 100 m hurdles – 17,0s; discus throw – 28.46m; pole vault – 3.30m; javelin throw – 40.69; 1,500 m – 5.32,4) Total points: 5899,105p (→ 16. place)
- Elmar Rähn – Final: (100 m – 11,8s; long jump – 6.27m; shot put – 9.525m; high jump – 1.60m; 400 m – 53,6s; 100 m hurdles – 18,4s; discus throw – dnf; pole vault – 2.80m; javelin throw – 38.38m; 1,500 m – 4.44,0) Total points: 5292,760p (→ 21. place)
- Valter Ever – Final: (100 m – 11,8; long jump – 6.45m; shot put – 10.90m; high jump – 1.70m; 400 m – 55,8s) (→ dnf, 32. place)

=== Boxing ===
Men's welterweight (−66,7 kg).

- Valter Palm
  - First round – lost to Héctor Méndez Argentina (→ did not advance, 17.-29. place)

=== Weightlifting ===
Men's featherweight (−60,0 kg)

- Aleksander Richmann (→ dns)
- Gustav Ernesaks 372,5 kg (60,0; 80,0; 67,5; 72,5; 92,5) (→ 6. place)

Men's lightweight (−67,5 kg)

- Eduard Vanaaseme 415,0 kg (65,5; 77,5; 85,0; 80,0; 107,5) (→ 6. place)
- Voldemar Noormägi 295,0 kg (65,5; 75,0; 85,0; 72,5; 0) (→ 22. place)

Men's middleweight (−75,0 kg)

- Alfred Neuland 455,0 kg (82,5; 90,0; 77,5; 90,0; 115,0) .(→ Silver Medal)
- Jaan Kikkas 450,0 kg (70,0; 87,5; 80,0; 85,0;127,5 ).(→ Bronze Medal)

Men's light-heavyweight (−82,5 kg)

- Saul Hallap 465,0 kg (75,0; 95,0; 90,0; 90,0; 115,0) (→ 9. place)

Men's heavyweight (+82,5 kg)

- Harald Tammer 497,5 kg (75,0; 95,0; 90,0; 97,5; 140,0 ).(→ Bronze Medal)
- Kalju Raag 490,0 kg (80,0; 92,5; 90,0; 97,5; 130,0) (→ 7. place)

=== Wrestling ===
Men's Greco-Roman Bantamweight (−58 kg)

- Eduard Pütsep
  - First round – defeated P. Slock Belgium by fall 4 min.
  - Second round – defeated Väinö V. Ikonen Finland with points.
  - Third round – defeated J. Skopový Czechoslovakia with points.
  - Fourth round – defeated Anselm Ahlfors Finland by fall 16 min.
  - Fifth round – defeated Armand Magyar Hungary with points.
  - Sixth round – defeated Sigfrid Hansson Sweden with points. (→ Gold Medal)
- Anton Koolmann
  - First round – defeated Georges Appruzeze France by fall 13min 10s.
  - Second round – lost to Giovanni Gozzi Italy with points.
  - Third round – lost to Väinö V. Ikonen Finland with points. (→ did not advance, 13.-16. place)

Men's Greco-Roman Featherweight (−62 kg)

- Voldemar Väli
  - First round – defeated Eduard Rottiers Belgium with points.
  - Second round – defeated Jordán Vallmajo Giralt Spain by fall 3m 45s.
  - Third round – lost to Arthur Nord Norway with points.
  - Fourth round – lost to Ödön Radvány Hungary with points. (→ did not advance, 8.-11. place)
- Osvald Käpp
  - First round – defeated René Rottenfluc France by fall 16m 12s.
  - Second round – defeated Jenö Németh Hungary with points.
  - Third round – lost to Aage Torgensen Denmark with points.
  - Fourth round – lost to Kalle Anttila Finland with points. (→ did not advance, 8.-11. place)

Men's Greco-Roman Lightweight (−67,5 kg)

- Albert Kusnets
  - First round – defeated G. Metayer France by fall 12 min 20s.
  - Second round – defeated Otto Borgström Sweden by fall 1 min 20s.
  - Third round – defeated Walter Ranghieri Italy by fall 0min 00s.
  - Fourth round – defeated Mihály Matura Hungary with points.
  - Fifth round – defeated Arne Gaupseth Norway with points.
  - Sixth round – lost to Kalle Westerlund Finland with points. (→ 4. place)
- Alfred Praks
  - First round – defeated Holger Askehave Denmark with points.
  - Second round – defeated Leon Rękawek Poland by fall 2 min 30s.
  - Third round – lost to Rūdolfs Ronis (Rudolf Rone) Latvia with points 26min.
  - Fourth round – lost to Kalle Westerlund Finland with points. (→ did not advance, 10.-12. place)

Men's Greco-Roman Middleweight (−75,0 kg)

- Roman Steinberg
  - First round – defeated Ferenc Györgyei (A. Györffy) Hungary with points.
  - Second round – free.
  - Third round – defeated F. Pražky Czechoslovakia by fall 19min 45s.
  - Fourth round – defeated J. Domas France with points.
  - Fifth round – lost to Giuseppe Gorletti Italy with points.
  - Sixth round – defeated Viktor Fischer Austria with points. (→ Bronze Medal)

Men's Greco-Roman Light Heavyweight (−82,5 kg)

- Rudolf Loo
  - First round – lost to Emil Wecksten Finland with points.
  - Second round – defeated Bonnefonti France by fall.
  - Third round – defeated István Dömény Hungary by fall.
  - Fourth round – lost to Olli Pellinen Finland with points. (→ did not advance, 6. place)

Men's Freestyle Featherweight (−61 kg)

- Anton Koolmann
  - 1/8 Final round – lost to Robin Reed United States
  - Tournament to 2nd place – First round – lost to Chester Newton United States. (→ did not advance, 10. place)

Men's Freestyle Lightweight (−66 kg)

- Alfred Praks
  - 1/8 Final round – defeated Perry Martter United States.
  - 1/4 Final round – lost to Arvo Haavisto Finland. (→ did not advance, 7. place)
- Osvald Käpp
  - 1/8 Final round – lost to George Gardiner Great Britain (→ did not advance, 11.-16. place)

=== Football ===
- Estonian Team: incl. reserves (J.Brenner, E. Einmann, Eduard Ellman-Eelma, V.Gerassimov, N.Javorski, Ernst Joll, Alfei Jürgenson, Harald Kaarmann, Elmar Kaljot, J.Kihlefeld, August Lass, J.Lello, Ralf Liivar, Heinrich Paal, Arnold Pihlak, H.Põder, Bernhard Rein, Voldemar Rõks, Otto Silber, Evald Tipner, Oskar Üpraus, Hugo Väli)
- 1 round (May 25, 1924) (Stade Pershing), Bois de Vincennes (Paris), (7500)

Referees : M.Putz (Belgium), Youssof Mohammed (Egypt) and G.A.Herren (Switzerland)

Estonia: August Lass, Arnold Pihlak, Otto Silber, Elmar Kaljot, Bernhard Rein, Harald Kaarmann, Hugo Väli, Heinrich Paal, Eduard Ellman-Eelma, Oskar Üpraus, Ernst Joll

United States: Jimmy Douglas, Irving Davis, Arthur Rudd, Franke Burke Jones, Raymond Hornberger, Fred O'Connor, William Findlay, Aage Brix, Andy Straden, Henry Farrell, Sam Dalrymple

lost to United States 0:1 goal by Andy Straden (United States) 10.min.(pen). (→ did not advance)
