= Weightlifting at the 1928 Summer Olympics – Men's +82.5 kg =

Men's heavyweight weightlifting at the Games of the IX Olympiad
- Date: 29 July
- Competitors: 17 from 11 nations

Medalists
1st place, gold medalist(s)		Josef Straßberger	Germany
2nd place, silver medalist(s)		Arnold Luhaäär	Estonia
3rd place, bronze medalist(s)		Jaroslav Skobla	Czechoslovakia

The men's heavyweight or unlimited event was part of the weightlifting programme at the 1928 Summer Olympics in Amsterdam. The weight class was the heaviest contested, and allowed weightlifters over 82.5 kilograms (181.5 pounds). The competition was held on Sunday, 29 July 1928.

== Records ==
These were the standing world and Olympic records (in kilograms) prior to the 1928 Summer Olympics.

World Record	Press	?	(Austria) Rudolf Schilberg	Vienna (AUT)	1928
World Record	Snatch	126.5	(France) Charles Rigoulot	Paris (FRA)	1926
World Record	Clean & Jerk	161.5	(France) Charles Rigoulot	Paris (FRA)	1925
World Record	Total	380	(Germany) Karl Morke	Stuttgart (GER)	1920
Olympic Record	Press	112.5	(Italy) Giuseppe Tonani	Paris (FRA)	24 July 1924
Olympic Record	Press	112.5	(Austria) Franz Aigner	Paris (FRA)	24 July 1924
Olympic Record	Snatch	100	(Italy) Giuseppe Tonani	Paris (FRA)	24 July 1924
Olympic Record	Snatch	100	(France) Louis Dannoux	Paris (FRA)	24 July 1924
Olympic Record	Snatch	100	(France) Claudius Dutriève	Paris (FRA)	24 July 1924
Olympic Record	Clean & Jerk	140	(Estonia) Harald Tammer	Paris (FRA)	24 July 1924
Olympic Record	Total	342.5(*)	(Italy) Giuseppe Tonani	Paris (FRA)	24 July 1924

(*) Originally a five lift competition.

All four Olympic records were improved in this competition. Josef Straßberger set a new world record in press with 122.5 kilograms.

== Results ==
All figures in kilograms.

Place	Weightlifter	Press			Snatch			Clean & jerk			Total
Place	Weightlifter	1.	2.	3.	1.	2.	3.	1.	2.	3.	Total
1	Josef Straßberger (GER)	115	120	122.5	102.5	107.5	X (110)	137.5	X (142.5)	142.5	372.5
2	Arnold Luhaäär (EST)	92.5	97.5	100	X (110)	110	X (115)	140	145	150	360
3	Jaroslav Skobla (TCH)	90	100	X (105)	97.5	X (107.5)	107.5	140	147.5	X (150)	357.5
4	Kārlis Leilands (LAT)	105	110	X (115)	105	X (110)	X (110)	X (140)	X (140)	140	355
5	Rudolf Schilberg (AUT)	X (115)	115	X (120)	97.5	105	X (107.5)	X (132.5)	135	X (137.5)	355
5	Josef Leppelt (AUT)	95	100	105	100	110	X (115)	130	X (140)	140	355
7	Giuseppe Tonani (ITA)	112.5	117.5	X (120)	97.5	X (102.5)	X (102.5)	127.5	135	137.5	352.5
8	Hermann Volz (GER)	92.5	97.5	X (102.5)	102.5	107.5	110	127.5	132.5	X (137.5)	340
9	Claudius Dutriève (FRA)	90	97.5	X (100)	100	X (105)	X (105)	127.5	132.5	X (137.5)	330
10	Marcel Dumoulin (FRA)	87.5	92.5	X (95)	100	X (105)	X (105)	130	135	X (140)	327.5
10	Francesco Mercoli (ITA)	102.5	X (107.5)	X (107.5)	X (100)	100	X (105)	125	X (130)	-	327.5
12	Minus Verheijen (NED)	90	95	100	90	X (95)	X (95)	X (120)	130	-	325
13	Harold Wood (GBR)	90	95	X (100)	X (95)	95	X (100)	120	125	X (130)	315
14	Franz Riederer (SUI)	X (85)	85	90	90	X (95)	X (95)	115	120	X (125)	300
15	Marcel Panen (BEL)	X (80)	80	85	X (77.5)	80	85	110	115	X (120)	280
16	Walter Gasser (SUI)	80	85	X (87.5)	77.5	X (82.5)	X (82.5)	105	X (110)	-	267.5
-	Hendrik Verheijen (NED)	95	102.5	X (105)	100	X (105)	X (105)	X (137.5)	-	-	-

== Sources ==
- Olympic Report
- Wudarski, Pawel (1999). "Wyniki Igrzysk Olimpijskich" (in Polish).
