= Austria at the 1924 Summer Olympics =

- IOC code: AUT
- NOC: Austrian Olympic Committee

in Paris
- Competitors: 49 (46 men, 3 women) in 8 sports
- Medals Ranked 20th: Gold 0 Silver 3 Bronze 1 Total 4

Summer Olympics appearances (overview)
- 1896; 1900; ~~1904~~; 1908; 1912; 1920; 1924; 1928; 1932; 1936; 1948; 1952; 1956; 1960; 1964; 1968; 1972; 1976; 1980; 1984; 1988; 1992; 1996; 2000; 2004; 2008; 2012; 2016; 2020; 2024; 2028

Other related appearances
- 1906 Intercalated Games

Austria competed at the 1924 Summer Olympics in Paris, France, returning to the Olympic Games after boycotting the 1920 Games because of the nation's role in World War I. 49 competitors, 46 men and 3 women, took part in 27 events in 8 sports.

== Medalists ==
| Medal | Name | Sport | Event | Date |
|---|---|---|---|---|
| Silver | Andreas Stadler | Weightlifting | Men's 60 kg | 21 July |
| Silver | Anton Zwerina | Weightlifting | Men's 67.5 kg | 22 July |
| Silver | Franz Aigner | Weightlifting | Men's +82.5 kg | 23 July |
| Bronze | Leopold Friedrich | Weightlifting | Men's 82.5 kg | 23 July |

== Aquatics ==
=== Diving ===
Three divers represented Austria in 1924. It was the nation's second appearance in the sport. Bornett reached the final in the springboard event, finishing sixth overall.

Ranks given are within the heat.

Women

| Diver | Event | Semifinals | | | Final | | |
| Diver | Event | Points | Score | Rank | Points | Score | Rank |
|---|---|---|---|---|---|---|---|
| Margarete Adler | 3 m board | 19.5 | 125 | 4 | did not advance | | |
| Klara Bornett | 3 m board | 13 | 417.4 | 3 Q | 28 | 370.2 | 6 |
| Viktoria Sölkner | 3 m board | 21 | 362.9 | 4 | did not advance | | |

== Athletics ==
Seven athletes represented Austria in 1924. It was the nation's fourth appearance in the sport. None of the Austrian athletes reached an event final.

Ranks given are within the heat.

| Athlete | Event | Heats | | Quarterfinals | | Semifinals | | Final | |
| Athlete | Event | Result | Rank | Result | Rank | Result | Rank | Result | Rank |
|---|---|---|---|---|---|---|---|---|---|
| Ludwig Deckardt | 800 m | Unknown | 4 | did not advance | | | | | |
| Ferdinand Friebe | 1500 m | N/A | | | | 4:15.8 | 3 | did not advance | |
| Ferdinand Kaindl | 100 m | Unknown | 3 | did not advance | | | | | |
| Hans Kantor | 5000 m | N/A | | | | Unknown | 10 | did not advance | |
| Rudolf Kühnel | 10 km walk | N/A | | | | Disqualified | | did not advance | |
| Rudolf Rauch | 200 m | Unknown | 2 Q | Unknown | 5 | did not advance | | | |
| Fritz Schedl | 100 m | Unknown | 4 | did not advance | | | | | |

== Boxing ==
Three boxers represented Austria at the 1924 Games. It was the nation's debut in the sport. All three Austrians were defeated in their first bout.

| Boxer | Weight class | Round of 32 | Round of 16 | Quarterfinals | Semifinals | Final / Bronze match | |
| Boxer | Weight class | Opposition Score | Opposition Score | Opposition Score | Opposition Score | Opposition Score | Rank |
|---|---|---|---|---|---|---|---|
| Franz Barta | Bantamweight | Sybille (BEL); L | did not advance | | | | 17 |
| Alexander Decker | Welterweight | Stauffer (SUI); L | did not advance | | | | 17 |
| Anton Eichholzer | Lightweight | Petersen (DEN); L | did not advance | | | | 17 |

| Opponent nation | Wins | Losses | Percent |
|---|---|---|---|
| Belgium | 0 | 1 | .000 |
| Denmark | 0 | 1 | .000 |
| Switzerland | 0 | 1 | .000 |
| Total | 0 | 3 | .000 |

| Round | Wins | Losses | Percent |
|---|---|---|---|
| Round of 32 | 0 | 3 | .500 |
| Round of 16 | 0 | 0 | – |
| Quarterfinals | 0 | 0 | – |
| Semifinals | 0 | 0 | – |
| Final | 0 | 0 | – |
| Bronze match | 0 | 0 | – |
| Total | 0 | 3 | .000 |

== Equestrian ==
Two equestrians represented Austria in 1924. It was the nation's debut in the sport.

| Equestrian | Event | Final | | |
| Equestrian | Event | Score | Time | Rank |
|---|---|---|---|---|
| Arthur von Pongracz | Dressage | 234.2 | N/A | 12 |
| Dagobert von Sekullic-Vrich | Dressage | 179.8 | N/A | 22 |

== Fencing ==
Five fencers, all men, represented Austria in 1924. It was the nation's fifth appearance in the sport.

Men

Ranks given are within the pool.

| Fencer | Event | Round 1 | | Round 2 | | Quarterfinals | | Semifinals | | Final | |
| Fencer | Event | Result | Rank | Result | Rank | Result | Rank | Result | Rank | Result | Rank |
|---|---|---|---|---|---|---|---|---|---|---|---|
| Kurt Ettinger | Foil | 3–1 | 2 Q | 3–2 | 3 Q | 4–1 | 2 Q | 0–5 | 6 | did not advance | |
| Alois Gottfried | Foil | 1–2 | 3 Q | 0–5 | 6 | did not advance | | | | | |
| Ernst Huber | Foil | 1–2 | 4 | did not advance | | | | | | | |
| Richard Brünner; Kurt Ettinger; Alois Gottfried; Ernst Huber; Hugo Philipp | Team foil | Bye | | N/A | | 0–3 | 4 | did not advance | | | |

== Shooting ==
Six sport shooters represented Austria in 1924. It was the nation's second appearance in the sport.

| Shooter | Event | Final | |
| Shooter | Event | Score | Rank |
|---|---|---|---|
| Heinrich Bartosch | Trap | 95 | 9 |
| August Baumgartner | Trap | 88 | 29 |
| Hans Schödl | Trap | 93 | 14 |
| Erich Zoigner | Trap | 89 | 24 |
| Heinrich Bartosch; August Baumgartner; Hans Schödl; Erich Zoigner; Friedrich Dietz von Weidenberg; Franz Hollitzer | Team clay pigeons | 347 | 6 |

== Weightlifting ==
| Athlete | Event | 1H Snatch | 1H Clean & Jerk | Press | Snatch | Clean & Jerk | Total | Rank |
|---|---|---|---|---|---|---|---|---|
| Franz Aigner | Men's +82.5 kg | | | | | | 515 | 2nd place, silver medalist(s) |
| Franz Andrysek | Men's −60 kg | 60 | 75 | 67.5 | 72.5 | X | 275 | 19 |
| Gustav Becker | Men's +82.5 kg | | | | | | 460 | 10 |
| Rudolf Edinger | Men's −75 kg | 62.5 | X | 95 | 80 | 110 | 347.5 | 24 |
| Rupert Eidler | Men's −75 kg | 65 | 90 | 82.5 | 85 | 115 | 437.5 | 7 |
| Wilhelm Etzenberger | Men's −67.5 kg | 65 | 85 | 70 | 75 | 110 | 405 | 9 |
| Karl Freiberger | Men's −82.5 kg | 75 | 95 | 92.5 | 95 | 130 | 487.5 | 4 |
| Leopold Friedrich | Men's −82.5 kg | 75 | 95 | 95 | 95 | 130 | 490 | 3rd place, bronze medalist(s) |
| Josef Gill | Men's −75 kg | 60 | 85 | 85 | 80 | 110 | 420 | 9 |
| Hermann Glück | Men's −82.5 kg | 75 | 80 | 87.5 | 90 | 120 | 452.5 | 11 |
| Josef Leppelt | Men's +82.5 kg | | | | | | 455 | 11 |
| Wilhelm Rosinek | Men's −60 kg | 57.5 | 75 | 67.5 | 70 | 105 | 375 | 5 |
| Andreas Stadler | Men's −60 kg | 65 | 75 | 65 | 75 | 105 | 385 | 2nd place, silver medalist(s) |
| Leopold Treffny | Men's −67.5 kg | 65 | 85 | 77.5 | 85 | 112.5 | 425 | 4 |
| Anton Zwerina | Men's −67.5 kg | 75 | 80 | 77.5 | 82.5 | 112.5 | 427.5 | 2nd place, silver medalist(s) |

== Wrestling ==
=== Greco-Roman ===
Men's

| Athlete | Event | First round | Second round | Third round | Fourth round | Fifth round | Sixth round | Seventh round | Eighth round | Rank |
| Athlete | Event | Opposition Result | Opposition Result | Opposition Result | Opposition Result | Opposition Result | Opposition Result | Opposition Result | Opposition Result | Rank |
|---|---|---|---|---|---|---|---|---|---|---|
| Johann Bergmann | Lightweight | Beránek (TCH); L | Gaupset (NOR); L | did not advance | | | | | | =20 |
| Viktor Fischer | Middleweight | Gorletti (ITA); W | Gorgano (ITA); W | Kónyi (HUN); W | Pštros (TCH); W | Lindfors (FIN); L | Steinberg (EST); L | Did not advance | —N/a | =5 |
| Adolf Herschmann | Bantamweight | Çakin (TUR); W | Gundersen (DEN); W | Bozděch (TCH); W | Kueny (FRA); W | Hansson (SWE); L | Retired | —N/a | | =5 |
| Karl Mezulian | Featherweight | Rudzits (LAT); W | Toivola (FIN); L | Malmberg (SWE); L | did not advance | | | | | =13 |
| Franz Mileder | Heavyweight | Dame (FRA); L | Rosenqvist (FIN); L | did not advance | | | | —N/a | | =13 |
| Josef Penczik | Featherweight | Sánchez (ESP); W | Retired | did not advance | | | | | | 27 |
| Franz Sax | Light heavyweight | Baumanis (LAT); L | Tetens (DEN); L | did not advance | | | | | —N/a | =12 |
| Ludwig Sesta | Lightweight | Matura (HUN); L | Mollin (BEL); W | Parisel (FRA); W | Gaupset (NOR); L | did not advance | | —N/a | | =9 |
