= Weightlifting at the 1924 Summer Olympics – Men's +82.5 kg =

Men's heavyweight weightlifting at the Games of the VIII Olympiad
- Venue: Olympisch Stadion
- Date: 23 July
- Competitors: 19 from 12 nations

Medalists
1st place, gold medalist(s)		Giuseppe Tonani	Italy
2nd place, silver medalist(s)		Franz Aigner	Austria
3rd place, bronze medalist(s)		Harald Tammer	Estonia

The men's heavyweight event was part of the weightlifting programme at the 1924 Summer Olympics in Paris. The weight class was the heaviest contested, and allowed weightlifters of over 82.5 kilograms (181.5 pounds). The competition was held on Wednesday, 23 July 1924.

== Results ==
One hand snatch

Place	Weightlifter	Body weight	one hand snatch		
Place	Weightlifter	Body weight	1.	2.	3.
1	Jos Alzin (LUX)	146	X (87,5)	87,5	X (90)
2	Louis Dannoux (FRA)	97,5	75	X (80)	80
2	Giuseppe Tonani (ITA)	109	75	X (80)	80
2	Franz Aigner (AUT)	107	80	X (85)	X (85)
2	Kaljo Raag (EST)	100	70	X (80)	80
2	Josef Leppelt (AUT)	99,5	X (80)	80	X (82,5)
7	Kārlis Leilands (LAT)	110,3	X (75)	75	77,5
7	Filippo Bottino (ITA)	98,5	70	75	77,5
9	Harald Tammer (EST)	104,5	67,5	72,5	75
9	Claudius Dutriève (FRA)	99	X (70)	70	75
9	Gustav Becker (AUT)	96	70	75	X (80)
12	Georges Bernaert (BEL)	86	70	X (75)	X (75)
12	Salvatore Epicoco (ITA)	94,9	65	70	X (75)
12	Rikard Brunn (SWE)	94,5	70	X (75)	X (75)
12	Ab Oord (NED)	99	67	X (70)	70
12	René Dupont (FRA)	87,7	67	X (70)	70
17	František Fišer (TCH)	97	X (65)	65	X (72,5)
17	Eugène Peney (SUI)	99,5	65	X (70)	X (70)
19	Harold Wood (GBR)	97	60	X (65)	X (65)

One hand clean & jerk

Place	Weightlifter	Body weight	one hand snatch	one hand clean & jerk			Total
Place	Weightlifter	Body weight	one hand snatch	1.	2.	3.	Total
1	Franz Aigner (AUT)	107	80	87,5	92,5	97,5	177,5
2	Giuseppe Tonani (ITA)	109	80	87,5	X (95)	95	175
2	Louis Dannoux (FRA)	97,5	80	90	X (95)	95	175
4	Kaljo Raag (EST)	100	80	87,5	92,5	X (97,5)	172,5
5	Harald Tammer (EST)	104,5	75	85	90	95	170
5	Jos Alzin (LUX)	146	87,5	X (82,5)	82	X (87,5)	170
7	Kārlis Leilands (LAT)	110,3	77,5	82,5	87,5	X (90)	165
8	Filippo Bottino (ITA)	98,5	77,5	80	X (85)	85	162,5
9	Josef Leppelt (AUT)	99,5	80	80	X (90)	X (90)	160
10	Claudius Dutriève (FRA)	99	75	77,5	82,5	X (85)	157,5
11	Gustav Becker (AUT)	96	75	80	X (87,5)	X (87,5)	155
11	Salvatore Epicoco (ITA)	94,9	70	80	85	X (90)	155
13	Rikard Brunn (SWE)	94,5	70	77,5	82,5	X (90)	152,2
14	Georges Bernaert (BEL)	86	70	X (80)	80	X (85)	150
14	Eugène Peney (SUI)	99,5	65	X (85)	85	X (90)	150
16	René Dupont (FRA)	87,7	70	77,5	X (82,5)	X (82,5)	147,5
17	Ab Oord (NED)	99	70	70	75	X (80)	145
17	František Fišer (TCH)	97	65	X (80)	X (80)	80	145
19	Harold Wood (GBR)	97	60	X (70)	70	75	135

Press

Place	Weightlifter	Body weight	one hand snatch	one hand clean & jerk	Press			Total
Place	Weightlifter	Body weight	one hand snatch	one hand clean & jerk	1.	2.	3.	Total
1	Franz Aigner (AUT)	107	80	97,5	100	110	112,5	290
2	Giuseppe Tonani (ITA)	109	80	95	107,5	112,5	X (115)	287,5
3	Jos Alzin (LUX)	146	87,5	82,5	X (105)	105	X (110)	275
4	Filippo Bottino (ITA)	98,5	77,5	85	100	107,5	110	272,5
5	Kārlis Leilands (LAT)	110,3	77,5	87,5	X (100)	100	X (102,5)	265
6	Louis Dannoux (FRA)	97,5	80	95	82,5	87,5	X (90)	262,5
6	Kaljo Raag (EST)	100	80	92,5	90	X (95)	X (95)	262,5
8	Harald Tammer (EST)	104,5	75	95	85	90	X (92,5)	260
9	Salvatore Epicoco (ITA)	94,9	70	85	87,5	92,5	95	250
9	Josef Leppelt (AUT)	99,5	80	80	90	X (95)	X (95)	250
11	Claudius Dutriève (FRA)	99	75	82,5	90	X (95)	X (95)	247,5
12	Georges Bernaert (BEL)	86	70	80	90	95	X (97,5)	245
12	Rikard Brunn (SWE)	94,5	70	82,2	X (87,5)	87,5	92,5	245
14	Gustav Becker (AUT)	96	75	80	87,5	X (92,5)	X (92,5)	242,5
15	Ab Oord (NED)	99	70	75	85	90	92,5	237,5
16	František Fišer (TCH)	97	65	80	90	X (95)	X (95)	235
17	Eugène Peney (SUI)	99,5	65	85	X (80)	80	X (85)	230
18	René Dupont (FRA)	87,7	70	77,5	77,5	X (82,5)	X (82,5)	225
19	Harold Wood (GBR)	97	60	75	82,5	X (87,5)	X (87,5)	217,5

Two hand snatch

Place	Weightlifter	Body weight	one hand snatch	one hand clean & jerk	Press	Snatch			Total
Place	Weightlifter	Body weight	one hand snatch	one hand clean & jerk	Press	1.	2.	3.	Total
1	Giuseppe Tonani (ITA)	109	80	95	112,5	92,5	97,5	100	387,5
2	Franz Aigner (AUT)	107	80	97,5	112,5	90	95	X (100)	385
3	Filippo Bottino (ITA)	98,5	77,5	85	110	92,5	X (97,5)	97,5	370
4	Kārlis Leilands (LAT)	110,3	77,5	87,5	100	95	100	X (105)	365
5	Louis Dannoux (FRA)	97,5	80	95	87,5	X (95)	95	100	362,5
6	Kaljo Raag (EST)	100	80	92,5	90	92,5	97,5	X (100)	360
7	Harald Tammer (EST)	104,5	75	95	90	92,5	X (97,5)	97,5	357,5
8	Claudius Dutriève (FRA)	99	75	82,5	90	X (95)	95	100	347,5
9	Georges Bernaert (BEL)	86	70	80	95	90	95	X (100)	340
9	Josef Leppelt (AUT)	99,5	80	80	90	X (90)	90	X (100)	340
11	Salvatore Epicoco (ITA)	94,9	70	85	95	80	85	X (90)	335
12	Gustav Becker (AUT)	96	75	80	87,5	85	X (90)	90	332,5
13	Rikard Brunn (SWE)	94,5	70	82,2	92,8	80	85	X (90)	330
14	Ab Oord (NED)	70	70	75	92,5	85	90	X (95)	327,5
15	František Fišer (TCH)	97	65	80	90	80	85	X (90)	320
16	René Dupont (FRA)	87,7	70	77,5	77,5	90	X (95)	X (95)	315
17	Harold Wood (GBR)	97	60	75	82,5	80	85	90	307,5
18	Eugène Peney (SUI)	99,5	65	85	80	X (85)	X (85)	X (85)	230
-	Jos Alzin (LUX)	146	87,5	82,5	105	DNS	DNS	DNS	275

Two hand clean & jerk

Final standing after the last event:

Place	Weightlifter	Body weight	one hand snatch	one hand clean & jerk	Press	Snatch	Clean & jerk			Total
Place	Weightlifter	Body weight	one hand snatch	one hand clean & jerk	Press	Snatch	1.	2.	3.	Total
1	Giuseppe Tonani (ITA)	109	80	95	112,5	100	125	130	X (135)	517,5 OR
2	Franz Aigner (AUT)	107	80	97,5	112,5	95	X (130)	130	X (135)	515
3	Harald Tammer (EST)	104,5	75	95	90	97,5	130	135	140	497,5
4	Louis Dannoux (FRA)	97,5	80	95	87,5	100	130	135	X (140)	497,5
5	Kārlis Leilands (LAT)	110,3	77,5	87,5	100	100	125	132,5	X (135)	497,5
6	Filippo Bottino (ITA)	98,5	77,5	85	110	97,5	120	X (125)	125	495
7	Kaljo Raag (EST)	100	80	92,5	90	97,5	125	130	X (135)	490
8	Claudius Dutriève (FRA)	99	75	82,5	90	100	120	X (125)	X (125)	467,5
9	Georges Bernaert (BEL)	86	70	80	95	95	125	X (130)	X (130)	465
10	Gustav Becker (AUT)	96	75	80	87,5	90	122,5	X (127,5)	127,5	460
11	Salvatore Epicoco (ITA)	94,9	70	85	95	85	120	X (125)	X (125)	455
11	Josef Leppelt (AUT)	99,5	80	80	90	90	115	X (122,5)	X (122,5)	455
13	Rikard Brunn (SWE)	94,5	70	82,2	92,8	85	115	120	122,5	452,5
14	Ab Oord (NED)	70	70	75	92,5	90	120	X (125)	X (125)	447,5
15	René Dupont (FRA)	87,7	70	77,5	77,5	90	120	X (125)	125	440
16	František Fišer (TCH)	97	65	80	90	85	X (115)	115	X (120)	435
17	Harold Wood (GBR)	97	60	75	82,5	90	105	X (110)	110	417,5
-	Eugène Peney (SUI)	99,5	65	85	80	DNF	DNS	DNS	DNS	DNF
-	Jos Alzin (LUX)	146	87,5	82,5	105	DNS	DNS	DNS	DNS	DNF

== Sources ==
- Olympic Report
- Wudarski, Pawel (1999). "Wyniki Igrzysk Olimpijskich" (in Polish).
