= Weightlifting at the 1924 Summer Olympics – Men's 67.5 kg =

Men's lightweight weightlifting at the Games of the VIII Olympiad
- Venue: Olympisch Stadion
- Date: 22 July
- Competitors: 22 from 12 nations

Medalists
1st place, gold medalist(s)		Edmond Decottignies	France
2nd place, silver medalist(s)		Anton Zwerina	Austria
3rd place, bronze medalist(s)		Bohumil Durdis	Czechoslovakia

The men's lightweight event was part of the weightlifting programme at the 1924 Summer Olympics in Paris. The weight class was the second-lightest contested, and allowed weightlifters of up to 67.5 kilograms (148.8 pounds). The competition was held on 22 July 1924.

== Results ==
One hand snatch

Place	Weightlifter	Body weight	one hand snatch		
Place	Weightlifter	Body weight	1.	2.	3.
1	Anton Zwerina (AUT)	66.3	67.5	72.5	75
2	Edmond Decottignies (FRA)	66.0	65	70	X (72.5)
3	Bohumil Durdis (TCH)	67.0	65	70	X (72.5)
3	Felix Bichsel (SUI)	67.0	65	70	X (72.5)
5	Joseph Jaquenoud (SUI)	64.5	65	X (70)	X (70)
6	Eduard Vanaaseme (EST)	66.0	60	65	X (67.5)
6	Wilhelm Etzenberger (AUT)	66.0	65	X (70)	X (70)
8	G. Butter (BEL)	66.3	60	X (65)	65
9	Jules van Gunten (SUI)	66.5	60	65	X (67.5)
10	Leopold Treffny (AUT)	67.5	65	X (70)	X (70)
10	Ēriks Rauska (LAT)	67.5	60	65	X (67.5)
12	André Delloue (FRA)	65.9	62.5	X (67.5)	X (67.5)
13	Martin Olofsson (SWE)	66.2	55	60	62.5
14	Guus Scheffer (NED)	66.5	62.5	X (67.5)	X (67.5)
15	Voldemar Noormägi (EST)	67.5	55	62.5	X (65)
16	Silvio Quadrelli (ITA)	66.8	X (62.5)	62.5	X (67.5)
17	Cesare Bonetti (ITA)	66.2	60	X (65)	X (65)
18	Gastone Pierini (ITA)	66.0	55	X (60)	X (60)
19	William Wyatt (GBR)	66.7	50	55	X (60)
20	Johny Grün (LUX)	65.9	47.5	X (52.5)	52.5
21	John Tooley (GBR)	67.5	50	X (55)	X (55)
21	William Randall (GBR)	67.5	50	X (55)	X (55)

One hand clean & jerk

Place	Weightlifter	Body weight	one hand snatch	one hand clean & jerk			Total
Place	Weightlifter	Body weight	one hand snatch	1.	2.	3.	Total
1	Felix Bichsel (SUI)	67.0	70	85	95	X (100)	165
2	Edmond Decottignies (FRA)	66.0	70	85	90	92.5	162.5
3	Anton Zwerina (AUT)	66.3	75	75	80	X (85)	155
4	Bohumil Durdis (TCH)	67.0	70	X (82.5)	82.5	X (87.5)	152.5
5	Joseph Jaquenoud (SUI)	64.5	65	80	X (85)	85	150
6	Wilhelm Etzenberger (AUT)	66.0	65	75	80	85	150
7	Leopold Treffny (AUT)	67.5	65	80	X (85)	85	150
8	Eduard Vanaaseme (EST)	66.0	65	70	75	77.5	142.5
9	Jules van Gunten (SUI)	66.5	65	70	77.5	X (85)	142.5
9	Guus Scheffer (NED)	66.5	62.5	72.5	77.5	80	142.5
11	G. Butter (BEL)	66.3	65	70	75	X (80)	140
12	Martin Olofsson (SWE)	66.2	62.5	70	75	X (80)	137.5
13	Voldemar Noormägi (EST)	67.5	62.5	75	X (80)	X (80)	137.5
14	Silvio Quadrelli (ITA)	66.8	62.5	70	X (75)	X (75)	132.5
15	Cesare Bonetti (ITA)	66.2	60	65	X (70)	70	130
16	André Delloue (FRA)	65.9	62.5	65	X (70)	X (70)	127.5
17	Gastone Pierini (ITA)	66.0	55	65	70	72.5	127.5
18	Johny Grün (LUX)	65.9	52.5	62.5	67.5	X (72.5)	120
19	William Wyatt (GBR)	66.7	55	60	65	X (70)	120
20	John Tooley (GBR)	67.5	50	60	X (65)	65	115
21	William Randall (GBR)	67.5	50	60	X (65)	X (65)	110
22	Ēriks Rauska (LAT)	67.5	65	X (80)	X (85)	X (85)	65

Press

Place	Weightlifter	Body weight	one hand snatch	one hand clean & jerk	Press			Total
Place	Weightlifter	Body weight	one hand snatch	one hand clean & jerk	1.	2.	3.	Total
1	Edmond Decottignies (FRA)	66.0	70	92.5	72.5	77.5	X (80)	240
2	Anton Zwerina (AUT)	66.3	75	80	72.5	X (77.5)	77.5	232.5
3	Felix Bichsel (SUI)	67.0	70	95	60	65	X (67.5)	230
4	Joseph Jaquenoud (SUI)	64.5	65	85	X (77.5)	77.5	X (82.5)	227.5
5	Eduard Vanaaseme (EST)	66.0	65	77.5	77.5	82.5	85	227.5
6	Leopold Treffny (AUT)	67.5	65	85	72.5	77.5	X (80)	227.5
7	Bohumil Durdis (TCH)	67.0	70	82.5	70	72.5	X (77.5)	225
8	Guus Scheffer (NED)	66.5	62.5	80	80	X (85)	X (85)	222.5
9	Voldemar Noormägi (EST)	67.5	62.5	75	80	85	X (87.5)	222.5
10	Wilhelm Etzenberger (AUT)	66.0	65	85	70	X (75)	X (75)	220
11	Jules van Gunten (SUI)	66.5	65	77.5	72.5	X (77.5)	X (77.5)	215
12	G. Butter (BEL)	66.3	65	75	70	-	72.5	212.5
13	Cesare Bonetti (ITA)	66.2	60	70	72.5	77.5	80	210
14	Gastone Pierini (ITA)	66.0	55	72.5	75	80	X (85)	207.5
15	Martin Olofsson (SWE)	66.2	62.5	75	60	65	67.5	205
16	Silvio Quadrelli (ITA)	66.8	62.5	70	67.5	72.5	X (75)	205
17	André Delloue (FRA)	65.9	62.5	65	67.5	72.5	X (75)	200
18	Johny Grün (LUX)	65.9	52.5	67.5	60	65	67.5	187.5
19	William Wyatt (GBR)	66.7	55	65	60	65	X (67.5)	185
20	John Tooley (GBR)	67.5	50	65	60	65	X (67.5)	180
21	William Randall (GBR)	67.5	50	60	60	65	67.5	177.5
22	Ēriks Rauska (LAT)	67.5	65	NM	65	70	75	140

The third try of Johny Grün is mark in the official report as missed, but his best try in the press event is shown as 67.5 kilograms, so it looks like that he was able to clear 67.5 kg also.

Two hand snatch

Place	Weightlifter	Body weight	one hand snatch	one hand clean & jerk	Press	Snatch			Total
Place	Weightlifter	Body weight	one hand snatch	one hand clean & jerk	Press	1.	2.	3.	Total
1	Edmond Decottignies (FRA)	66.0	70	92.5	77.5	80	X (85)	85	325
2	Anton Zwerina (AUT)	66.3	75	80	77.5	77.5	82.5	X (85)	315
3	Bohumil Durdis (TCH)	67.0	70	82.5	72.5	82.5	87.5	90	315
4	Joseph Jaquenoud (SUI)	64.5	65	85	77.5	77.5	82.5	85	312.5
5	Leopold Treffny (AUT)	67.5	65	85	77.5	X (80)	80	85	312.5
6	Eduard Vanaaseme (EST)	66.0	65	77.5	85	70	77.5	80	307.5
7	Guus Scheffer (NED)	66.5	62.5	80	80	X (77.5)	77.5	82.5	305
8	Felix Bichsel (SUI)	67.0	70	95	65	75	X (80)	X (80)	305
9	Wilhelm Etzenberger (AUT)	66.0	65	85	70	X (75)	X (75)	75	295
10	G. Butter (BEL)	66.3	65	75	72.5	X (80)	80	82.5	295
11	Voldemar Noormägi (EST)	67.5	62.5	75	85	72.5	X (77.5)	X (77.5)	295
12	Jules van Gunten (SUI)	66.5	65	77.5	72.5	70	75	X (77.5)	290
13	André Delloue (FRA)	65.9	62.5	65	72.5	82.5	87.5	X (90)	287.5
14	Gastone Pierini (ITA)	66.0	55	72.5	80	72.5	77.5	80	287.5
15	Cesare Bonetti (ITA)	66.2	60	70	80	72.5	77.5	X (80)	287.5
16	Martin Olofsson (SWE)	66.2	62.5	75	67.5	72.5	77.5	80	285
17	Silvio Quadrelli (ITA)	66.8	62.5	70	72.5	75	X (80)	80	285
18	Johny Grün (LUX)	65.9	52.5	67.5	67.5	65	70	X (72.5)	257.5
19	William Wyatt (GBR)	66.7	55	65	65	65	70	72.5	257.5
20	John Tooley (GBR)	67.5	50	65	65	65	70	X (72.5)	250
21	William Randall (GBR)	67.5	50	60	67.5	60	X (65)	65	242.5
22	Ēriks Rauska (LAT)	67.5	65	NM	75	X (80)	X (80)	80	220

Two hand clean & jerk

Final standing after the last event:

Place	Weightlifter	Body weight	one hand snatch	one hand clean & jerk	Press	Snatch	Clean & jerk			Total
Place	Weightlifter	Body weight	one hand snatch	one hand clean & jerk	Press	Snatch	1.	2.	3.	Total
1	Edmond Decottignies (FRA)	66.0	70	92.5	77.5	85	105	110	115	440
2	Anton Zwerina (AUT)	66.3	75	80	77.5	82.5	107.5	X (112.5)	112.5	427.5
3	Bohumil Durdis (TCH)	67.0	70	82.5	72.5	90	110	X (117.5)	X (117.5)	425
4	Leopold Treffny (AUT)	67.5	65	85	77.5	85	X (112.5)	112.5	X (117.5)	425
5	Joseph Jaquenoud (SUI)	64.5	65	85	77.5	85	105	X (110)	X (110)	417.5
6	Eduard Vanaaseme (EST)	66.0	65	77.5	85	80	100	105	107.5	415
7	Guus Scheffer (NED)	66.5	62.5	80	80	82.5	105	X (110)	110	415
8	Felix Bichsel (SUI)	67.0	70	95	65	75	100	X (105)	105	410
9	Wilhelm Etzenberger (AUT)	66.0	65	85	70	75	X (110)	110	X (115)	405
10	Gaston Butter (BEL)	66.3	65	75	72.5	82.5	105	X (110)	110	405
11	André Delloue (FRA)	65.9	62.5	65	72.5	87.5	X (107.5)	107.5	112.5	400
12	Gastone Pierini (ITA)	66.0	55	72.5	80	80	100	105	X (107.5)	392.5
13	Cesare Bonetti (ITA)	66.2	60	70	80	77.5	100	105	X (107.5)	392.5
14	Martin Olofsson (SWE)	66.2	62.5	75	67.5	80	95	100	105	390
15	Jules von Gunten (SUI)	66.5	65	77.5	72.5	75	95	100	X (105)	390
16	Silvio Quadrelli (ITA)	66.8	62.5	70	72.5	80	100	105	X (110)	390
17	William Wyatt (GBR)	66.7	55	65	65	72.5	95	X (100)	X (100)	352.5
18	Johny Grün (LUX)	65.9	52.5	67.5	67.5	70	87.5	92.5	X (97.5)	350
19	John Tooley (GBR)	67.5	50	65	65	70	90	X (95)	95	345
20	William Randall (GBR)	67.5	50	60	67.5	65	85	90	X (95)	332.5
21	Ēriks Rauska (LAT)	67.5	65	NM	75	80	100	105	-	325
22	Voldemar Noormägi (EST)	67.5	62.5	75	85	72.5	X (105)	X (105)	-	295

== Sources ==
- official report
- Wudarski, Pawel (1999). "Wyniki Igrzysk Olimpijskich" (in Polish).
