= Weightlifting at the 1924 Summer Olympics – Men's 82.5 kg =

Men's light heavyweight weightlifting at the Games of the VIII Olympiad
- Venue: Olympisch Stadion
- Date: 23 July
- Competitors: 20 from 12 nations

Medalists
1st place, gold medalist(s)		Charles Rigoulot	France
2nd place, silver medalist(s)		Fritz Hünenberger	Switzerland
3rd place, bronze medalist(s)		Leopold Friedrich	Austria

The men's light-heavyweight event was part of the weightlifting programme at the 1924 Summer Olympics in Paris. The weight class was the second-heaviest contested, and allowed weightlifters of up to 82.5 kilograms (181.5 pounds). The competition was held on Wednesday, 23 July 1924.

== Results ==
One hand snatch

Place	Weightlifter	Body weight	one hand snatch		
Place	Weightlifter	Body weight	1.	2.	3.
1	Charles Rigoulot (FRA)	81.6	82.5	87.5	X (90)
2	Carlos Bergara (ARG)	81.1	72.5	77.5	80
3	Fritz Hünenberger (SUI)	81.9	X (80)	80	X (87.5)
4	Mario Giambielli (ITA)	78.2	72.5	X (77.5)	77.5
5	Saul Hallap (EST)	78.5	X (70)	70	75
6	Anton Schärer (SUI)	80.0	70	75	X (80)
7	Karl Freiberger (AUT)	81.5	70	75	X (80)
8	Leopold Friedrich (AUT)	82.0	70	75	X (80)
8	Hermann Glück (AUT)	82.0	70	75	X (80)
10	Jan Verheijen (NED)	79.0	62.5	67.5	72.5
11	Alfred Louncke (FRA)	81.7	62.5	67.5	70
12	Bohumil Stinný (TCH)	82.0	65	70	X (75)
13	Jaroslav Skobla (TCH)	82.5	70	X (75)	X (80)
14	Ēriks Reihmanis (LAT)	80.7	X (65)	65	X (70)
15	Bertil R. Carlsson (SWE)	81.2	60	65	X (70)
16	André Rolet (FRA)	77.0	62.5	X (67.5)	X (67.5)
17	Giuseppe Merlin (ITA)	80.2	55	60	62.5
18	F. Verdonck (BEL)	80.0	55	60	X (62.5)
19	Henri Lehnen (LUX)	81.2	X (60)	60	X (65)
20	Armando Tugnoli (ITA)	81.5	55	X (60)	X (60)

One hand clean & jerk

Place	Weightlifter	Body weight	one hand snatch	one hand clean & jerk			Total
Place	Weightlifter	Body weight	one hand snatch	1.	2.	3.	Total
1	Fritz Hünenberger (SUI)	81.9	80	100	107.5	X (112.5)	187.5
2	Charles Rigoulot (FRA)	81.6	87.5	87.5	X (92.5)	92.5	180
3	Mario Giambielli (ITA)	78.2	77.5	X (90)	90	95	172.5
4	Saul Hallap (EST)	78.5	75	X (90)	90	95	170
5	Karl Freiberger (AUT)	81.5	75	90	X (95)	95	170
6	Leopold Friedrich (AUT)	82.0	75	90	95	X (100)	170
7	Carlos Bergara (ARG)	81.1	80	80	85	X (87.5)	165
8	Jaroslav Skobla (TCH)	82.5	70	82.5	90	95	165
9	Anton Schärer (SUI)	80.0	75	80	85	X (90)	160
10	Alfred Louncke (FRA)	81.7	70	85	90	X (95)	160
11	Bertil R. Carlsson (SWE)	81.2	65	80	90	X (95)	155
12	Hermann Glück (AUT)	82.0	75	X (80)	80	X (90)	155
13	André Rolet (FRA)	77.0	62.5	X (82.5)	82.5	87.5	150
14	Jan Verheijen (NED)	79.0	72.5	70	72.5	77.5	150
15	Ēriks Reihmanis (LAT)	80.7	65	82.5	X (87.5)	X (87.5)	147.5
16	F. Verdonck (BEL)	80.0	60	X (70)	X (70)	70	130
17	Giuseppe Merlin (ITA)	80.2	62.5	65	X (70)	X (70)	127.5
18	Henri Lehnen (LUX)	81.2	60	65	X (70)	X (70)	125
19	Armando Tugnoli (ITA)	81.5	55	65	70	X (75)	125
20	Bohumil Stinný (TCH)	82.0	70	X (80)	X (85)	X (85)	70

Press

Place	Weightlifter	Body weight	one hand snatch	one hand clean & jerk	Press			Total
Place	Weightlifter	Body weight	one hand snatch	one hand clean & jerk	1.	2.	3.	Total
1	Fritz Hünenberger (SUI)	81.9	80	107.5	75	80	X (82.5)	267.5
2	Charles Rigoulot (FRA)	81.6	87.5	92.5	77.5	82.5	85	265
3	Leopold Friedrich (AUT)	82.0	75	95	90	X (95)	95	265
4	Karl Freiberger (AUT)	81.5	75	95	87.5	92.5	X (95)	262.5
5	Saul Hallap (EST)	78.5	75	95	80	85	90	260
6	Anton Schärer (SUI)	80.0	75	85	95	100	X (102.5)	260
7	Carlos Bergara (ARG)	81.1	80	85	85	90	92.5	257.5
8	Jaroslav Skobla (TCH)	82.5	70	95	85	92.5	X (95)	257.5
9	Mario Giambielli (ITA)	78.2	77.5	95	70	80	82.5	255
10	Alfred Louncke (FRA)	81.7	70	90	80	85	X (87.5)	245
11	Hermann Glück (AUT)	82.0	75	80	80	85	87.5	242.5
12	Bertil R. Carlsson (SWE)	81.2	65	90	75	80	85	240
13	Jan Verheijen (NED)	79.0	72.5	77.5	85	87.5	X (92.5)	237.5
14	Ēriks Reihmanis (LAT)	80.7	65	82.5	80	X (85)	85	232.5
15	André Rolet (FRA)	77.0	62.5	87.5	80	X (85)	X (85)	230
16	Giuseppe Merlin (ITA)	80.2	62.5	65	77.5	82.5	85	212.5
17	F. Verdonck (BEL)	80.0	60	70	70	X (75)	X (75)	200
18	Armando Tugnoli (ITA)	81.5	55	70	65	70	75	200
19	Henri Lehnen (LUX)	81.2	60	65	X (80)	X (80)	X (80)	125
20	Bohumil Stinný (TCH)	82.0	70	NM	X (85)	X (90)	-	70

Two hand snatch

Place	Weightlifter	Body weight	one hand snatch	one hand clean & jerk	Press	Snatch			Total
Place	Weightlifter	Body weight	one hand snatch	one hand clean & jerk	Press	1.	2.	3.	Total
1	Charles Rigoulot (FRA)	81.6	87.5	92.5	85	97.5	102.5	X (105)	367.5
2	Fritz Hünenberger (SUI)	81.9	80	107.5	80	92.5	X (97.5)	97.5	365
3	Leopold Friedrich (AUT)	82.0	75	95	95	90	95	X (100)	360
4	Karl Freiberger (AUT)	81.5	75	95	92.5	90	X (95)	95	357.5
5	Anton Schärer (SUI)	80.0	75	85	100	95	X (100)	X (100)	355
6	Carlos Bergara (ARG)	81.1	80	85	92.5	90	95	97.5	355
7	Mario Giambielli (ITA)	78.2	77.5	95	82.5	90	X (95)	95	350
8	Saul Hallap (EST)	78.5	75	95	90	X (85)	85	90	350
9	Jaroslav Skobla (TCH)	82.5	70	95	92.5	85	X (92.5)	X (95)	342.5
10	Alfred Louncke (FRA)	81.7	70	90	85	90	X (95)	95	340
11	Hermann Glück (AUT)	82.0	75	80	87.5	90	X (95)	X (95)	332.5
12	Bertil R. Carlsson (SWE)	81.2	65	90	85	80	85	90	330
13	Jan Verheijen (NED)	79.0	72.5	77.5	87.5	80	85	90	327.5
14	André Rolet (FRA)	77.0	62.5	87.5	80	87.5	X (92.5)	X (92.5)	317.5
15	Ēriks Reihmanis (LAT)	80.7	65	82.5	85	75	80	85	317.5
16	Giuseppe Merlin (ITA)	80.2	62.5	65	85	75	80	82.5	295
17	F. Verdonck (BEL)	80.0	60	70	70	75	80	X (82.5)	280
18	Armando Tugnoli (ITA)	81.5	55	70	75	X (75)	X (75)	75	275
19	Henri Lehnen (LUX)	81.2	60	65	NM	-	-	-	DNF
20	Bohumil Stinný (TCH)	82.0	70	NM	NM	-	-	-	DNF

Two hand clean & jerk

Final standing after the last event:

Place	Weightlifter	Body weight	one hand snatch	one hand clean & jerk	Press	Snatch	Clean & jerk			Total
Place	Weightlifter	Body weight	one hand snatch	one hand clean & jerk	Press	Snatch	1.	2.	3.	Total
1	Charles Rigoulot (FRA)	81.6	87.5	92.5	85	102.5	135	X (140)	X (140)	502.5
2	Fritz Hünenberger (SUI)	81.9	80	107.5	80	97.5	120	125	X (130)	490
3	Leopold Friedrich (AUT)	82.0	75	95	95	95	120	X (130)	130	490
4	Karl Freiberger (AUT)	81.5	75	95	92.5	95	130	X (135)	X (135)	487.5
5	Carlos Bergara (ARG)	81.1	80	85	92.5	97.5	122.5	127.5	X (130)	482.5
6	Mario Giambielli (ITA)	78.2	77.5	97.5	82.5	95	122.5	127.5	130	480
7	Anton Schärer (SUI)	80.0	75	85	100	95	120	X (125)	X (125)	475
8	Jaroslav Skobla (TCH)	82.5	70	95	92.5	85	120	127.5	X (132.5)	470
9	Saul Hallap (EST)	78.5	75	95	90	90	X (115)	115	X (120)	465
10	Alfred Louncke (FRA)	81.7	70	90	85	95	120	X (125)	X (125)	460
11	Hermann Glück (AUT)	82.0	75	80	87.5	90	120	X (130)	X (130)	452.5
12	Jan Verheijen (NED)	79.0	72.5	77.5	87.5	90	110	115	120	447.5
13	Bertil R. Carlsson (SWE)	81.2	65	90	85	90	110	115	X (120)	445
14	André Rolet (FRA)	77.0	62.5	87.5	80	87.5	X (112.5)	112.5	X (117.5)	430
15	Ernests Reihmanis (LAT)	80.7	65	82.5	85	85	105	110	112.5	430
16	Giuseppe Merlin (ITA)	80.2	62.5	65	85	82.5	105	110	X (115)	405
17	F. Verdonck (BEL)	80.0	60	70	70	80	100	X (105)	X (105)	380
18	Armando Tugnoli (ITA)	81.5	55	70	75	75	100	X (105)	X (105)	375
19	Henri Lehnen (LUX)	81.2	60	65	NM	-	-	-	-	DNF
20	Bohumil Stinný (TCH)	82.0	70	NM	NM	-	-	-	-	DNF

== Sources ==
- Olympic Report
- Wudarski, Pawel (1999). "Wyniki Igrzysk Olimpijskich" (in Polish).
