= Weightlifting at the 1924 Summer Olympics =

Weightlifting at the Games of the VIII Olympiad
- Weightlifting pictogram
- Venue: Vélodrome d'hiver
- Date: 21–23 July 1924
- No. of events: 5 (5 men, 0 women)
- Competitors: 107 from 16 nations

The weightlifting competition at the 1924 Summer Olympics in Paris consisted of five weight classes, all for men only.

== Medal summary ==
Games	Gold	Silver	Bronze
Featherweight –60 kg	Pierino Gabetti; Italy	Andreas Stadler; Austria	Arthur Reinmann; Switzerland
Lightweight –67.5 kg	Edmond Decottignies; France	Anton Zwerina; Austria	Bohumil Durdis; Czechoslovakia
Middleweight –75 kg	Carlo Galimberti; Italy	Alfred Neuland; Estonia	Jaan Kikkas; Estonia
Light-heavyweight –82.5 kg	Charles Rigoulot; France	Fritz Hünenberger; Switzerland	Leopold Friedrich; Austria
Heavyweight +82.5 kg	Giuseppe Tonani; Italy	Franz Aigner; Austria	Harald Tammer; Estonia

== Participating nations ==
- Argentina (3)
- Austria (15)
- Belgium (8)
- Czechoslovakia (6)
- Egypt (1)
- Estonia (8)
- France (14)
- Great Britain (10)
- Italy (15)
- Latvia (4)
- Luxembourg (4)
- Netherlands (3)
- Portugal (1)
- Sweden (5)
- Switzerland (9)
- Turkey (1)

== Medal table ==
Rank	Nation	Gold	Silver	Bronze	Total
1	Italy	3	0	0	3
2	France	2	0	0	2
3	Austria	0	3	1	4
4	Estonia	0	1	2	3
5	Switzerland	0	1	1	2
6	Czechoslovakia	0	0	1	1
Totals (6 entries)		5	5	5	15
