= Freiberger (surname) =

Freiberger is a German surname. Notable people with this surname include:

- Angela Freiberger (born 1953), Brazilian artist
- Bill Freiberger, television writer and producer
- Fred Freiberger (1915–2003), American television producer best known for his work on Star Trek
- Karl Freiberger (1901–1977), Austrian weightlifter
- Karl-Heinz Freiberger (1941–1992), German field hockey player
- Kevin Freiberger (born 1988), German footballer
- Marc Freiberger (1928–2005), American basketball player
- Markus Freiberger (born 1995), Austrian racing cyclist
- Miroslav Šalom Freiberger (1903–1943), Croatian rabbi and spiritual leader
