= Bichsel =

Bichsel is a surname. Notable people with the surname include:

- Felix Bichsel (1897–1970), Swiss weightlifter
- Lian Bichsel (born 2004), Swiss ice hockey player
- Peter Bichsel (1935–2025), Swiss writer and journalist
- William J. Bichsel (1928–2015), American Jesuit priest
