= Minus Verheijen =

Dutch weightlifter

Personal information
- Full name: Dominicus "Minus" Verheijen
- Nationality: Dutch
- Born: 18 November 1889; Horst, Netherlands
- Died: 6 October 1955 (aged 65); The Hague, Netherlands

Sport
- Sport: Weightlifting

Minus Verheijen (18 November 1889 – 6 October 1955) was a Dutch weightlifter. He competed in the men's heavyweight event at the 1928 Summer Olympics.

Minus was the brother of Hendrik and Jan Verheijen. All three brothers competed in weightlifting events at the 1928 Summer Olympics, where Jan was the only brother to win a medal, a bronze in the light heavyweight division.
