= 1922 World Weightlifting Championships =

Weightlifting contest within players from 4 nations, held in Estonia

1922 Men's World Championships
- Host city: Tallinn, Estonia
- Dates: April 29–30, 1922

The 1922 Men's World Weightlifting Championships were held in Tallinn, Estonia from April 29 to April 30, 1922. There were 33 men in action from 4 nations.

== Medal summary ==
Event	Gold	Silver	Bronze
Featherweight; 60 kg	Heinrich Graf; Switzerland	Karl Kõiv; Estonia	Gustav Ernesaks; Estonia
Lightweight; 67.5 kg	Alfred Neuland; Estonia	Eduard Vanaaseme; Estonia	Voldemar Noormägi; Estonia
Middleweight; 75 kg	Saul Hallap; Estonia	Alberts Ozoliņš; Latvia	Alfred Puusaag; Estonia
Light heavyweight 82.5 kg	Roger François; France	Johannes Toom; Estonia	Rudolf Tihane; Estonia
Heavyweight +82.5 kg	Harald Tammer; Estonia	Kārlis Leilands; Latvia	Kaljo Raag; Estonia

== Medal table ==
Rank	Nation	Gold	Silver	Bronze	Total
1	Estonia	3	3	5	11
2	France	1	0	0	1
2	Switzerland	1	0	0	1
4	Latvia	0	2	0	2
Totals (4 entries)		5	5	5	15
