= Silvio Quadrelli =

Italian weightlifter

Personal information
- Nationality: Italian
- Born: 9 April 1889; Milan, Italy
- Died: 8 January 1970 (aged 80); Milan, Italy

Sport
- Sport: Weightlifting

Silvio Quadrelli (9 April 1889 – 8 January 1970) was an Italian weightlifter. He competed in the men's lightweight event at the 1924 Summer Olympics.
