= Karl Kõiv =

Estonian weightlifter (1894–1972)

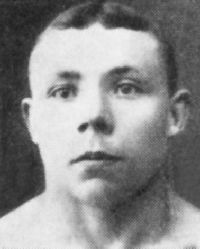

Personal information
- Born: 3 December 1894 Sootaga rural municipality, Estonia
- Died: 6 August 1974 (aged 79) Tallinn, Estonia
- Height: 165 cm (5 ft 5 in)
- Weight: 60 kg (132 lb)

Sport
- Sport: Weightlifting
- Club: Kalev Tartu
Medal record
Representing Estonia
World Championships
Silver medal – second place	1922 Tallinn	-60 kg

Karl Kõiv (3 December 1894 – 6 August 1974) was an Estonian featherweight weightlifter who won a silver medal at the 1922 World Weightlifting Championships and placed seventh at the 1920 Summer Olympics. In 1922–25, he headed the weightlifting section of the Estonian Sports Union. Later, he worked as a weightlifting coach and referee, and in this capacity attended the 1936 Summer Olympics.
