= Salvatore Epicoco =

Italian weightlifter

Personal information
- Nationality: Italian
- Born: 1897 Lecce, Italy

Sport
- Sport: Weightlifting

Salvatore Epicoco (born 1897, date of death unknown) was an Italian weightlifter. He competed in the men's heavyweight event at the 1924 Summer Olympics.
