= Ēriks Rauska =

Latvian weightlifter (1899–1981)

Personal information
- Nationality: Latvian
- Born: 27 May 1899 Valka, Latvia
- Died: 14 January 1981 (aged 81) São Paulo, Brazil

Sport
- Sport: Weightlifting

Ēriks Rauska (27 May 1899 – 14 January 1981) was a Latvian weightlifter. He competed in the men's lightweight event at the 1924 Summer Olympics.
