= André Rolet =

French weightlifter

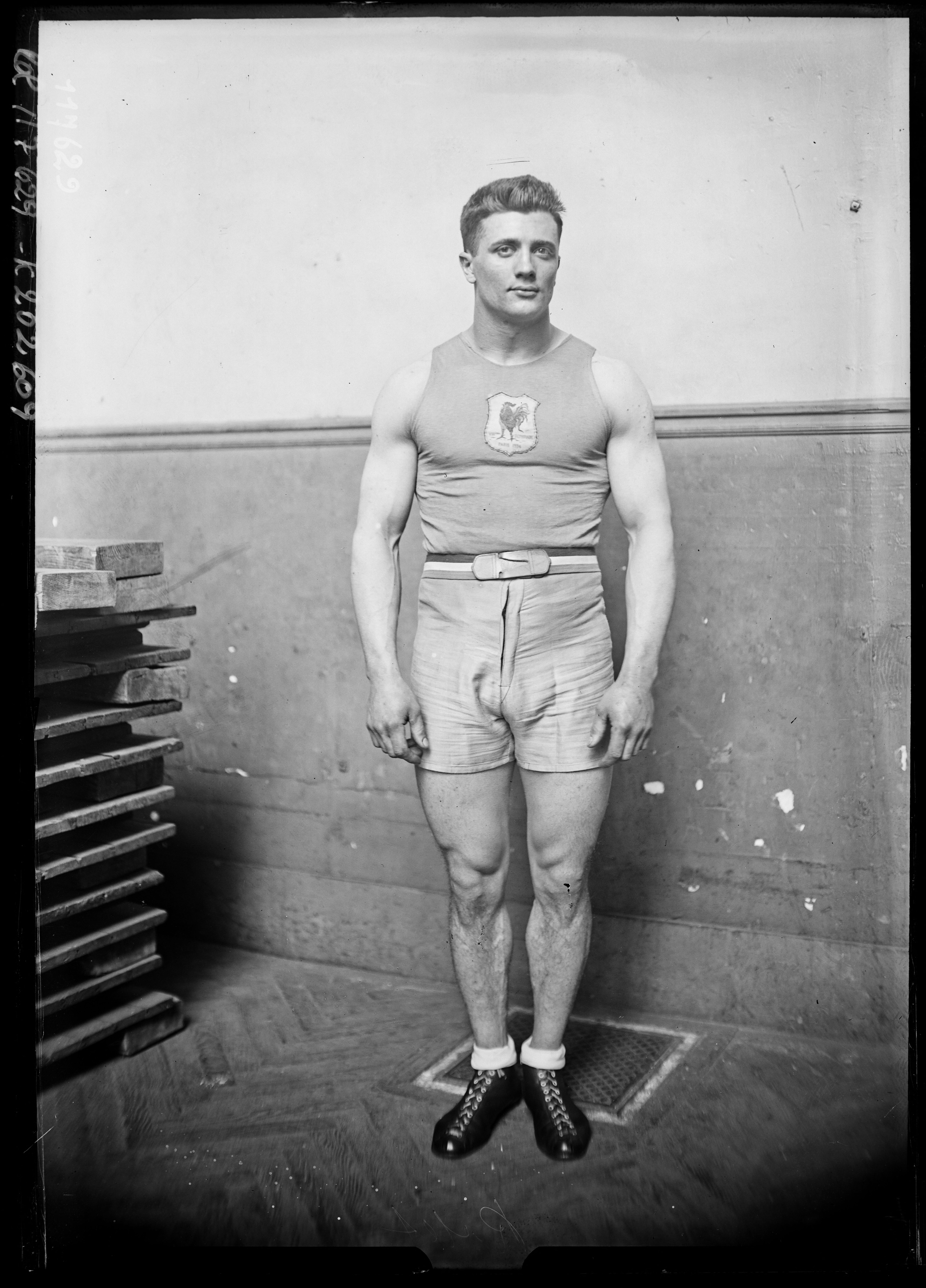
- André Rolet in 1927

Personal information
- Nationality: French
- Born: 5 August 1901
- Died: 11 February 1989 (aged 87)

Sport
- Sport: Weightlifting

André Rolet (5 August 1901 – 11 February 1989) was a French strongman and weightlifter. He competed in the men's light-heavyweight event at the 1924 Summer Olympics.

Rolet came third in the "Most Beautiful Athlete in Europe" competition.
