= William Wyatt (weightlifter) =

British weightlifter

Personal information
- Nationality: British
- Born: 14 April 1893; Hackney, London
- Died: 26 December 1989 (aged 96); Newton Abbot, Devon

Sport
- Sport: Weightlifting

William Wyatt (14 April 1893 – 26 December 1989) was a British weightlifter. He competed in the men's lightweight event at the 1924 Summer Olympics.
