= Carlos Bergara =

Argentine weightlifter (1895–1971)

Personal information
- Born: 8 May 1895; Buenos Aires, Argentina
- Died: 29 March 1971 (aged 75)

Sport
- Sport: Weightlifting

Carlos Bergara (8 May 1895 – 29 March 1971) was an Argentine weightlifter. He competed in the men's light-heavyweight event at the 1924 Summer Olympics.
