= Cesare Bonetti =

Italian weightlifter

Personal information
- Nationality: Italian
- Born: 10 March 1888; Fiorenzuola d'Arda, Italy
- Died: 14 May 1956 (aged 68); Milan, Italy

Sport
- Sport: Weightlifting

Cesare Bonetti (10 March 1888 – 14 May 1956) was an Italian weightlifter. He competed in the men's lightweight event at the 1924 Summer Olympics.
