= Eugène Peney =

Swiss weightlifter

Personal information
- Nationality: Swiss
- Born: 1889
- Died: Unknown

Sport
- Sport: Weightlifting

Eugène Peney (born 1889, date of death unknown) was a Swiss weightlifter. He competed in the men's heavyweight event at the 1924 Summer Olympics.
