= René Dupont =

French weightlifter

Personal information
- Nationality: French
- Born: 18 April 1896
- Died: 22 March 1966 (aged 69)

Sport
- Sport: Weightlifting

René Dupont (18 April 1896 – 22 March 1966) was a French weightlifter. He competed in the men's heavyweight event at the 1924 Summer Olympics.
