= Jan Verheijen =

Dutch weightlifter

Johannes "Jan" Verheijen
Personal information
- Born: 30 November 1896 The Hague, Netherlands
- Died: 29 April 1973 (aged 76) The Hague, Netherlands

Sport
- Sport: Weightlifting
Medal record
Representing Netherlands
Olympic Games
| Bronze medal – third place | 1928 Amsterdam | 82.5 kg |

Johannes "Jan" Verheijen (30 November 1896 – 29 April 1973) was a Dutch weightlifter who competed in the 1924 Summer Olympics and in the 1928 Summer Olympics. He was born and died in The Hague.

In 1924 he finished twelfth in the light-heavyweight class. Four years later he won the bronze medal in the light-heavyweight class of the 1928 Games. Jan was the brother of Hendrik and Minus Verheijen. All three brothers competed in weightlifting at the 1928 Summer Olympics, where Jan was the only one of the three to pick up a medal.
