= Ernests Reihmanis =

Latvian weightlifter

Personal information
- Nationality: Latvian
- Born: 5 November 1900 Riga

Sport
- Sport: Weightlifting

Ernests Reihmanis (born 5 November 1900, date of death unknown) was a Latvian weightlifter. He competed in the men's light-heavyweight event at the 1924 Summer Olympics.
