= Marcel Panen =

Belgian weightlifter

Personal information
- Nationality: Belgian
- Born: 27 August 1910; Gentbrugge, Belgium
- Died: 11 June 1934 (aged 23); Ghent, Belgium

Sport
- Sport: Weightlifting

Marcel Panen (27 August 1910 – 11 June 1934) was a Belgian weightlifter. He competed in the men's heavyweight event at the 1928 Summer Olympics.
