= Alfred Louncke =

French weightlifter

Personal information
- Nationality: French
- Born: 14 December 1899; Roubaix, France
- Died: 17 April 1976 (aged 76); Mouvaux, France

Sport
- Sport: Weightlifting

Alfred Louncke (14 December 1899 – 17 April 1976) was a French weightlifter. He competed in the men's light-heavyweight event at the 1924 Summer Olympics.
