= William Randall (weightlifter) =

British weightlifter

Personal information
- Nationality: British
- Born: 18 September 1885; Merthyr Tydfil, Wales
- Died: 9 January 1965 (aged 79)

Sport
- Sport: Weightlifting

William Randall (18 September 1885 – 9 January 1965) was a British weightlifter. He competed in the men's lightweight event at the 1924 Summer Olympics.
