= Gaston Butter =

Belgian weightlifter

Personal information
- Nationality: Belgian
- Born: 14 March 1888
- Died: Unknown

Sport
- Sport: Weightlifting

Gaston Butter (born 14 March 1888, date of death unknown) was a Belgian weightlifter. He competed in the men's lightweight event at the 1924 Summer Olympics.
