= Francesco Mercoli =

Italian weightlifter

Personal information
- Nationality: Italian
- Born: 20 May 1894; Milan, Italy
- Died: 19 May 1959 (aged 64); Milan, Italy

Sport
- Sport: Weightlifting

Francesco Mercoli (20 May 1894 – 19 May 1959) was an Italian weightlifter. He competed in the men's heavyweight event at the 1928 Summer Olympics.
