= František Fišer =

Czech weightlifter

Personal information
- Nationality: Czech
- Born: 18 July 1900; Prague, Austro-Hungarian Empire
- Died: 14 March 1942 (aged 41); Dachau, Nazi Germany

Sport
- Sport: Weightlifting

František Fišer (18 July 1900 – 14 March 1942) was a Czech weightlifter. He competed in the men's heavyweight event at the 1924 Summer Olympics. He was killed in the Dachau concentration camp during World War II.
