= Elmar Reimann =

Estonian long-distance runner (1893–1963)

Personal information
- Nationality: Estonian
- Born: 2 January 1893 Tartu, Russian Empire
- Died: 21 April 1963 (aged 70) Stockholm, Sweden

Sport
- Sport: Long-distance running
- Event: Marathon

Elmar Reimann (2 January 1893 – 21 April 1963) was an Estonian long-distance runner. He competed in the marathon for the Russian Empire at the 1912 Summer Olympics and for Estonia at the 1924 Summer Olympics.
