= Georges Bernaert =

Belgian weightlifter (1897–1969)

Gustaaf Bernaert
Personal information
- Full name: Gustavus Franciscus Bernart
- Nationality: Belgian
- Born: 19 June 1897; Ghent, Belgium
- Died: 23 December 1969 (aged 72); Gentbrugge, Belgium

Sport
- Sport: Weightlifting

Gustaaf Bernaert (19 June 1897 – 23 December 1969) was a Belgian weightlifter. He competed in the men's heavyweight event at the 1924 Summer Olympics.
