= Arnold Luhaäär =

Estonian weightlifter (1905–1965)

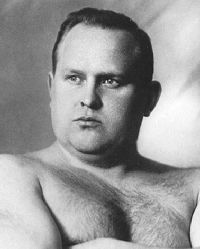
- Arnold Luhaäär in 1935

Personal information
- Born: 20 October 1905 Mõisaküla, Kreis Pernau, Governorate of Livonia, Russian Empire
- Died: 19 January 1965 (aged 59) Tallinn, then part of Estonian SSR, Soviet Union
- Height: 180 cm (5 ft 11 in)
- Weight: 120 kg (265 lb)

Sport
- Sport: Weightlifting
- Club: Eesti Töölisspordi Liit
Medal record
Representing Estonia
Olympic Games
| Silver medal – second place | 1928 Amsterdam | +82.5 kg |
| Bronze medal – third place | 1936 Berlin | +82.5 kg |
World Weightlifting Championships
| Bronze medal – third place | 1938 Vienna | +82.5 kg |
European Weightlifting Championships
| Silver medal – second place | 1933 Essen | +82.5 kg |

Arnold Luhaäär (20 October 1905 – 19 January 1965) was an Estonian heavyweight weightlifter. He competed in the 1928 and 1936 Olympic Games and won a silver and a bronze medal, respectively. He missed the 1932 games because Estonia could not afford sending a full team to Los Angeles during the Great Depression.

Luhaäär took up weightlifting in 1919 and won the national title in 1926, 1928, 1932–34 and 1936–38. In 1931 he also won the national Greco-Roman wrestling championships. Besides his Olympic medals he placed third at the 1938 World Championships and set a world record in the clean and jerk in 1937. After retiring from competitions he worked as a sports official and referee. In 1935–40 and 1945–52 he was a board member of the Estonian Weightlifting Federation, and in 1946–48 headed sport club Spartak Tallinn. Since 1992 an annual weightlifting tournament has been held in his hometown of Mõisaküla in his honor.
