= Jules von Gunten =

Swiss weightlifter

Personal information
- Nationality: Swiss
- Born: 1899

Sport
- Sport: Weightlifting

Jules von Gunten (1899 – ?) was a Swiss weightlifter. He competed in the men's lightweight event at the 1924 Summer Olympics.
