= Ab Oord =

Dutch weightlifter (1885–1961)

Personal information
- Nationality: Dutch
- Born: 21 December 1885 Gorinchem, Netherlands
- Died: 3 August 1961 (aged 75) Amsterdam, Netherlands

Sport
- Sport: Weightlifting

Ab Oord (21 December 1885 – 3 August 1961) was a Dutch weightlifter. He competed in the men's heavyweight event at the 1924 Summer Olympics.
