= Mario Giambielli =

Italian weightlifter

Personal information
- Nationality: Italian
- Born: 17 May 1897 Milan, Italy

Sport
- Sport: Weightlifting

Mario Giambielli (born 17 May 1897, date of death unknown) was an Italian weightlifter. He competed in the men's light-heavyweight event at the 1924 Summer Olympics.
