= Giuseppe Merlin =

Italian weightlifter

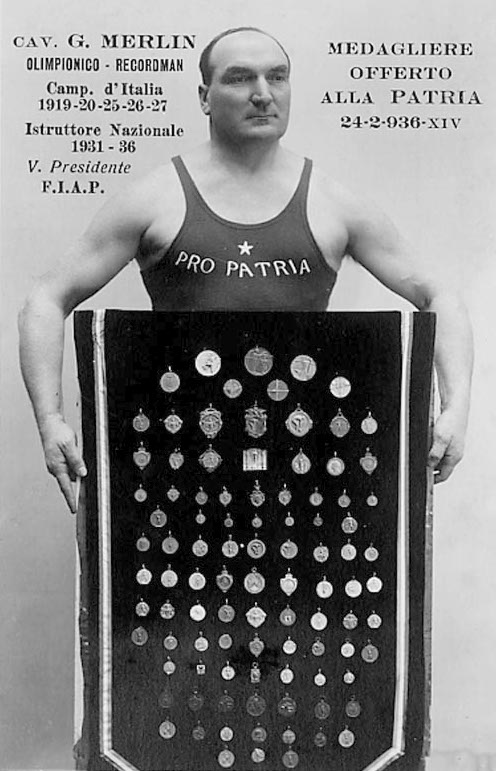

Personal information
- Born: 20 November 1891 Boara Pisani, Italy
- Died: 7 May 1967 (aged 75)

Sport
- Sport: Weightlifting
- Club: Club Atletico Milanese

Giuseppe Merlin (20 November 1891 – 7 May 1967) was an Italian light-heavyweight weightlifter. He won the national title in 1919, 1920 and 1925–1927 and placed 16th at the 1924 Summer Olympics.
