= Anton Schärer =

Swiss weightlifter

Personal information
- Nationality: Swiss
- Born: 1898

Sport
- Sport: Weightlifting

Anton Schärer (born 1898, date of death unknown) was a Swiss weightlifter. He competed in the men's light-heavyweight event at the 1924 Summer Olympics.
