= Henri Lehnen =

Luxembourgish weightlifter (1899–1963)

Personal information
- Nationality: Luxembourgish
- Born: 19 March 1899 Strassen, Luxembourg
- Died: 4 November 1963 (aged 64) Strassen, Luxembourg

Sport
- Sport: Weightlifting

Henri Lehnen (19 March 1899 – 4 November 1963) was a Luxembourgish weightlifter. He competed in the men's light-heavyweight event at the 1924 Summer Olympics.
