= Alfred Puusaag =

Estonian weightlifter (1897–1951)

Alfred August Johannes Puusaag (12 January 1897 – 25 January 1951) was an Estonian weightlifter.

He was born in Ropka manor, Tartu County.

Since 1915 he exercised at the sport club Aberg, located in Tartu. He won bronze medal at 1922 World Weightlifting Championships. In 1921, 1922 and 1924 he won Estonian Championships.
