= Felix Bichsel =

Swiss weightlifter

Personal information
- Nationality: Swiss
- Born: 1897
- Died: February 1970 (aged 72–73)

Sport
- Sport: Weightlifting

Felix Bichsel (1897 – February 1970) was a Swiss weightlifter. He competed in the men's lightweight event at the 1924 Summer Olympics.
