= Edmond Decottignies =

French weightlifter

Olympic medal record

Men's weightlifting

Representing France
Gold medal – first place	1924 Paris	-67.5 kg

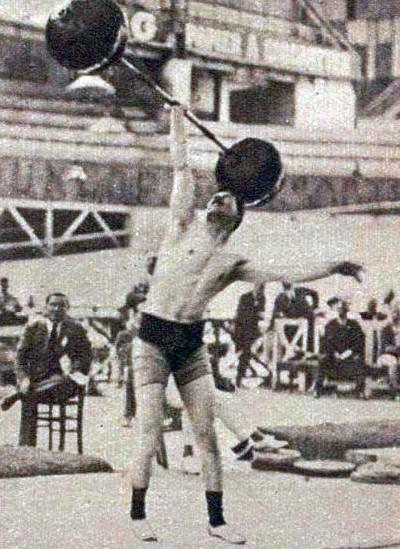
Edmond Decottignies

Edmond Decottignies (3 December 1893 – 3 June 1963) was a French weightlifter who competed in the 1924 Summer Olympics. He was born in Comines.

Decottignies won a gold medal in the lightweight class in 1924. He became French champion in 1921, 1923, and 1924. An international tournament, Mémorial Edmond Decottignies, is annually held in Comines in his memory.
