= André Delloue =

French weightlifter

Personal information
- Full name: André Julien Victor Delloue
- Nationality: French
- Born: 18 April 1899 Roubaix, France
- Died: 19 February 1974 (aged 74) Marseille, France

Sport
- Sport: Weightlifting

André Julien Victor Delloue (18 April 1899 – 19 February 1974) was a French weightlifter. He competed at the 1920 Summer Olympics and the 1924 Summer Olympics.
