= Hugo Väli =

Estonian footballer

Hugo-Eugen Väli
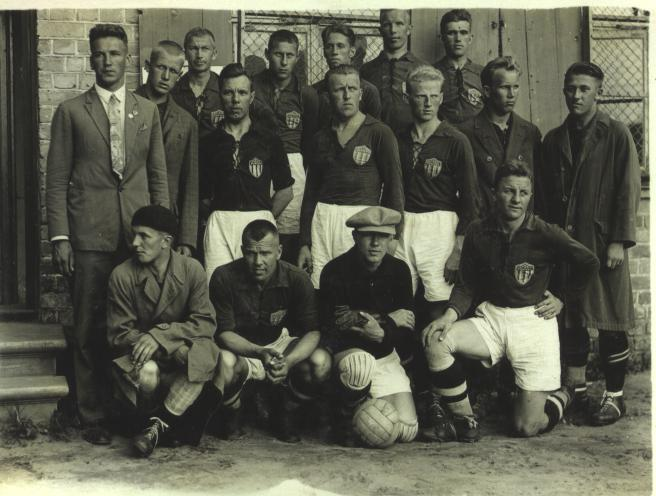

Personal information
- Date of birth: 19 May 1902
- Place of birth: Üksnurme, Estonia
- Date of death: 22 September 1944 (aged 42)
- Place of death: Tallinn, Estonia

International career
Years	Team	Apps	(Gls)
1923–1925	Estonia	12	(1)

Hugo-Eugen Väli (19 May 1902 – 22 September 1944) was an Estonian footballer. He competed in the men's tournament at the 1924 Summer Olympics. Outside football he worked as a railway electrician. He died in a Soviet prison camp during World War II.
