= Filippo Bottino =

Italian weightlifter

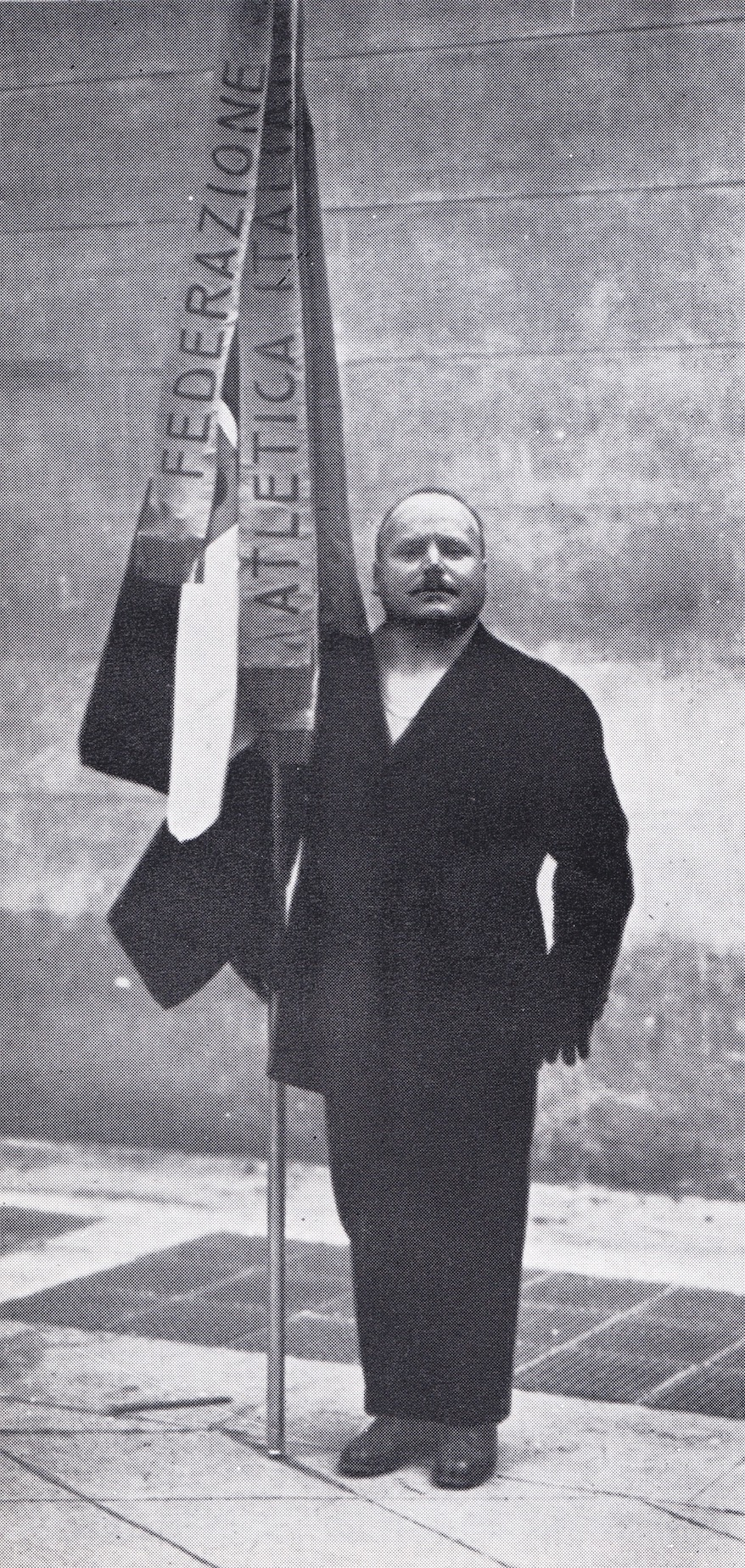

Personal information
- Born: 9 December 1888 Genova, Italy
- Died: 18 October 1969 (aged 80) Sestri Ponente, Genova, Italy
- Weight: 99 kg (218 lb)

Sport
- Sport: Weightlifting
- Club: Ginnastica Sampierdarenese, Genova
Medal record
Representing Italy
Olympic Games
Gold medal – first place	1920 Antwerp	+82.5 kg

Filippo Emanuele Bottino (9 December 1888 – 18 October 1969) was an Italian heavyweight weightlifter who won a gold medal at the 1920 Olympics. In 1922, he became the first Italian weightlifter to break a world record, in the press, and in 1924 he finished sixth at the Paris Olympics. He was made a Knight of the Italian Republic and received the Medal of Honour for Sporting Merit.
