= James Tooley (weightlifter) =

British weightlifter

Personal information
- Nationality: British
- Born: 13 October 1899; Birmingham, England
- Died: 30 January 1983 (aged 83); Derby, England

Sport
- Sport: Weightlifting

James Tooley (13 October 1899 – 30 January 1983) was a British weightlifter. He competed at the 1924 Summer Olympics and the 1928 Summer Olympics.
