= Johny Grün =

Luxembourgish weightlifter

Personal information
- Nationality: Luxembourgish
- Born: 19 June 1897 Luxembourg, Luxembourg
- Died: 1940 (aged 42–43)

Sport
- Sport: Weightlifting

Johny Grün (19 June 1897 – 1940) was a Luxembourgish weightlifter. He competed at the 1920 Summer Olympics and the 1924 Summer Olympics.
