= Angela Freiberger =

Brazilian artist

- Born: 1953; Rio de Janeiro, Brazil
- Known for: Performance art, Sculpture, Video art

Angela Freiberger (born 1953) is a Brazilian artist from Rio de Janeiro. She is best known for works that emphasize the relation between sculpture and performance.

== Biography ==
In 1976, Freiberger received a Bachelor of Arts degree from the School of Fine Arts at the Federal University of Rio de Janeiro (UFRJ). In 1987 she studied computer graphics at the University of California in Los Angeles. In the early 1990s she lived in Italy and Portugal where she learned to sculpt in marble. In 2007 she earned an MFA from Stony Brook University, New York.

Freiberger was included in the Sixth Havana Biennial in 1997, the First Prospect New Orleans Biennial in 2008 and the Second Bronx Biennial at the Bronx Museum of the Arts, New York in 2010. Her installation Collection of Urinals (2001), was shown at Rio de Janeiro's Centro Cultural Oduvaldo Vianna Filho in 2002.

She was a reperformer in Marina Abramović's show "The Artist is Present" at the Museum of Modern Art in 2009.

== Works in permanent collections ==
Freiberger's work is part of the João Sattamini collection at Museu de Arte Contemporânea de Niterói in Rio de Janeiro and the Gilberto Chateaubriand collection at the Museum of Modern Art, Rio de Janeiro.

== Fellowships and residencies ==
Freiberger received the Senior Fellowship from the Terra Foundation for American Art in 2010.

In 2012 Freiberger participated in "Hotel de Inmigrantes 2, Cosmopolitan Stranger," in Hasselt, Belgium, which ran at the same time as the Manifesta 9 biennial.
