= Wilhelm Etzenberger =

Austrian weightlifter

Personal information
- Nationality: Austrian
- Born: 6 September 1901
- Died: 21 January 1966 (aged 64)

Sport
- Sport: Weightlifting

Wilhelm Etzenberger (6 September 1901 – 21 January 1966) was an Austrian weightlifter. He competed in the men's lightweight event at the 1924 Summer Olympics.
