= Burke Jones =

American soccer player

Personal information
- Full name: Francis Burkhart Jones
- Date of birth: April 25, 1903
- Place of birth: Bridgeville, Pennsylvania, United States
- Date of death: January 30, 1983 (aged 79)
- Place of death: Carnegie, Pennsylvania, United States

Senior career*
Years	Team	Apps	(Gls)
- Bridgeville F.C.

International career
1924	United States	3	(0)
- * Club domestic league appearances and goals

Burke Jones (April 25, 1903 – January 30, 1983) was an American soccer player. He earned three caps with the U.S. national team in 1924. His first two caps came in the 1924 Summer Olympics. The U.S. won its first game 1–0 against Estonia, but lost to Uruguay in the quarterfinals. Following its elimination from the tournament, the U.S. played two exhibition games. Jones played the first, a win over Poland. That was Jones' last game with the national team. At the time of the Olympics, he played for the Bridgevill Football Club.
