= Louis Dannoux =

French weightlifter

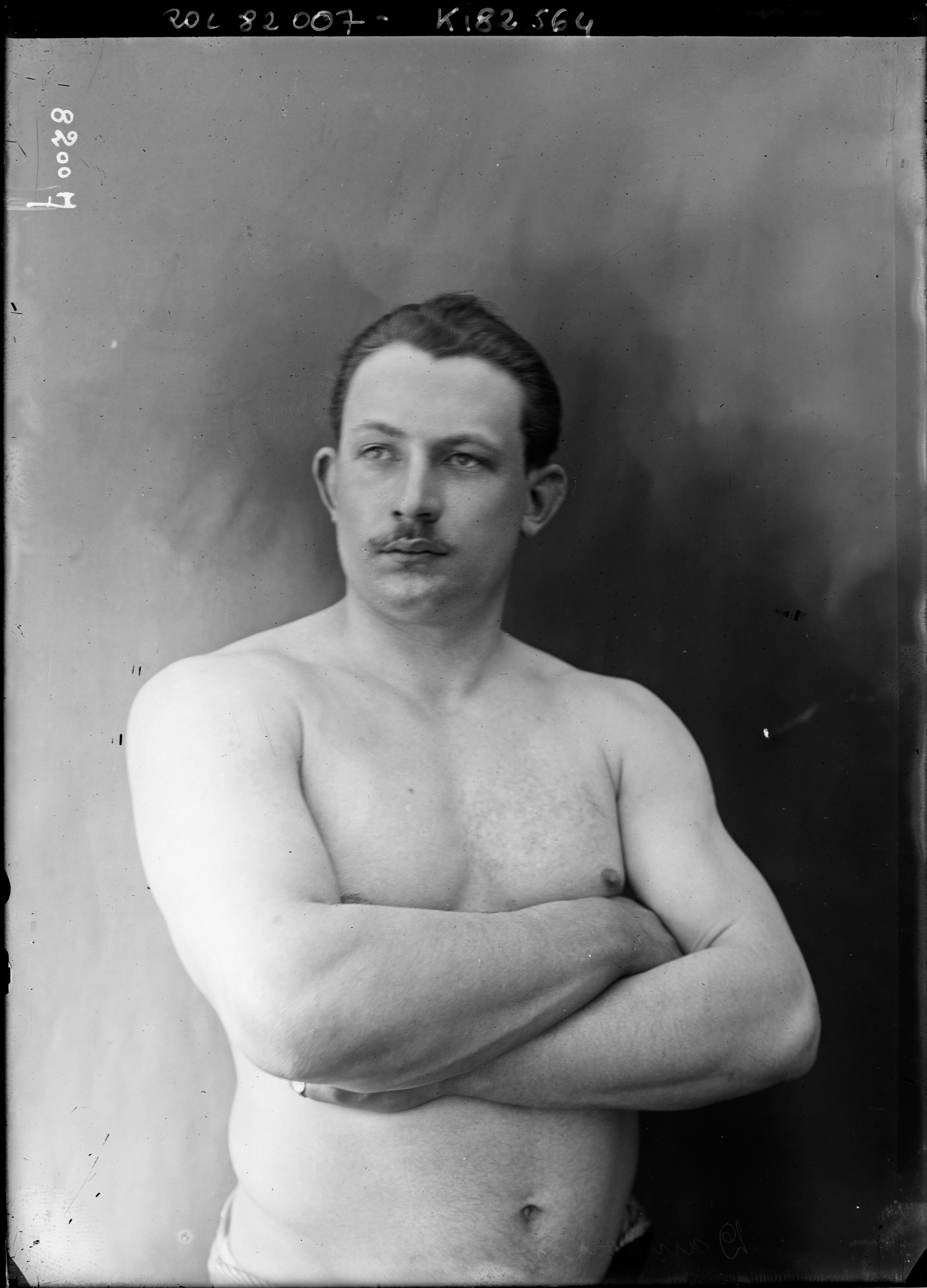

Personal information
- Nationality: French
- Born: 24 November 1900
- Died: 28 May 1970 (aged 69)

Sport
- Sport: Weightlifting

Louis Dannoux (24 November 1900 – 28 May 1970) was a French weightlifter. He competed in the men's heavyweight event at the 1924 Summer Olympics.
