= Fritz Hünenberger =

Swiss weightlifter (1897 - 1976)

Medal record

Men's weightlifting

Representing Switzerland

Olympic Games
| Silver medal – second place | 1920 Antwerp | -82.5 kg |
| Silver medal – second place | 1924 Paris | -82.5 kg |

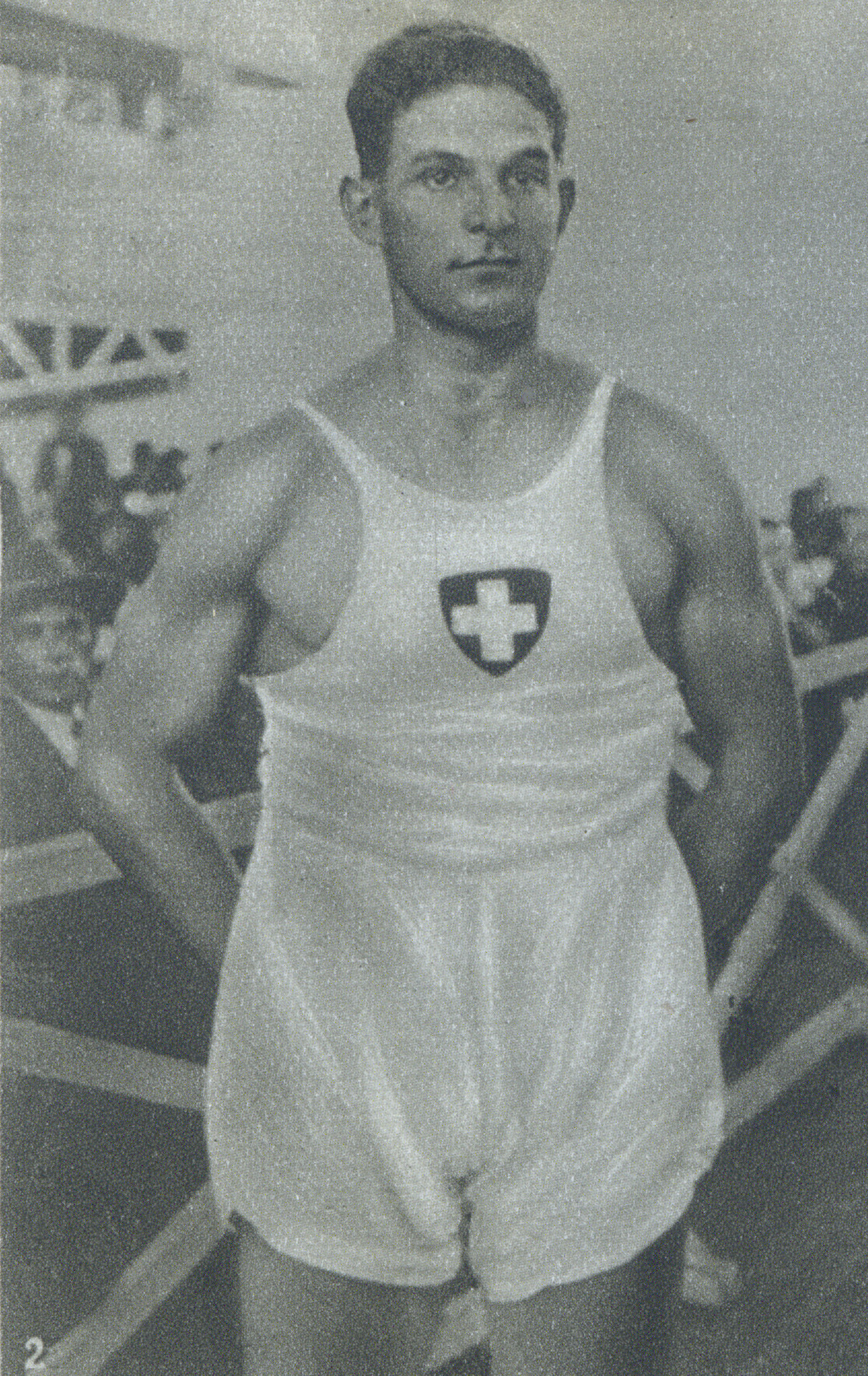
Fritz Hünenberger in 1924

Friedrich "Fritz" Hünenberger (14 March 1897 – 30 August 1976) was a Swiss weightlifter who competed in the 1920 Summer Olympics and in the 1924 Summer Olympics. He won two Olympic silver medals in the light-heavyweight class.
