= Bertil R. Carlsson =

Swedish weightlifter

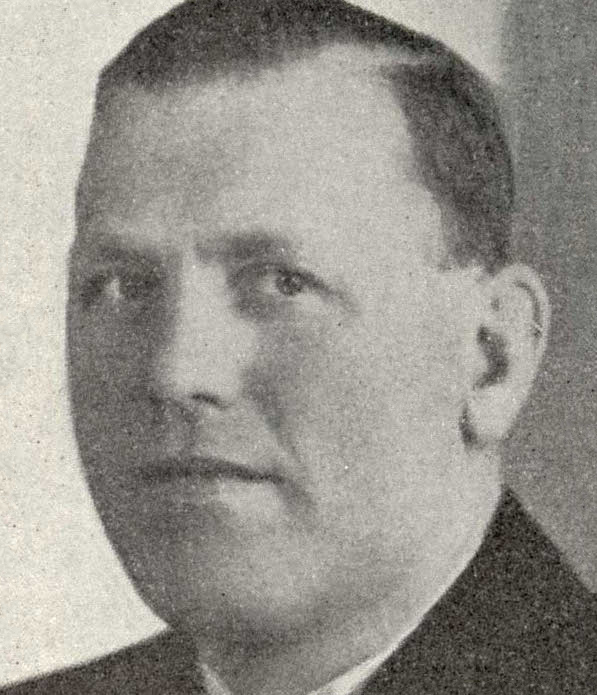
- Carlsson in 1924

Personal information
- Born: 18 March 1901 Örebro, Sweden
- Died: 23 February 1959 (aged 57) Örebro, Sweden
- Weight: 81 kg (179 lb)

Sport
- Sport: Weightlifting
- Club: Örebro AK

Bertil Robert Carlsson (18 March 1901 – 23 February 1959) was a Swedish weightlifter. He competed in the light-heavyweight division at the 1924 Summer Olympics and finished 13th.
