= Bohumil Durdis =

Czech weightlifter

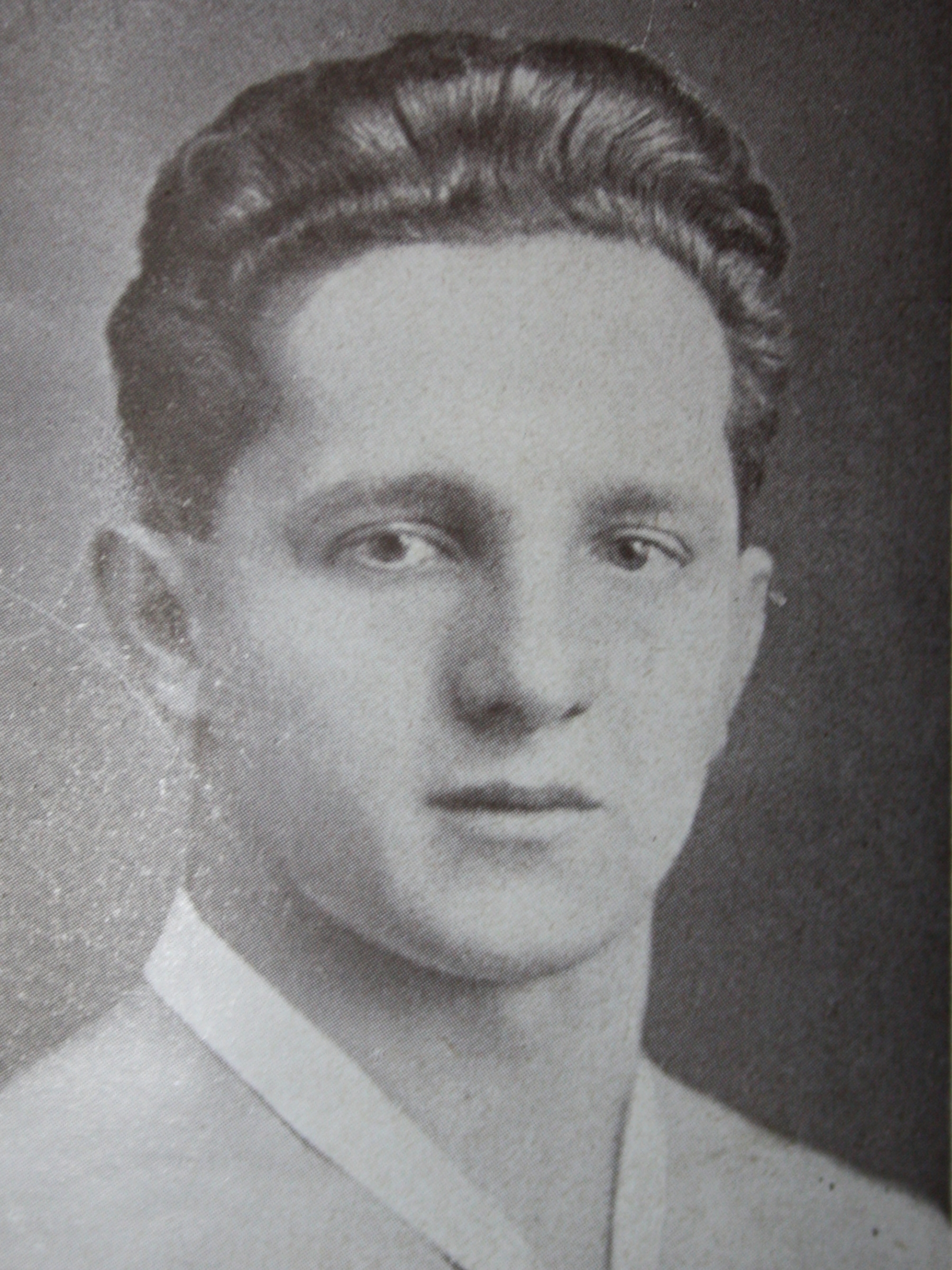
Medal record
Men's Weightlifting
Bronze medal – third place	1924 Paris	Lightweight

Bohumil Durdis (1 March 1903, in Prague – 16 March 1983, in Copenhagen, Denmark) was a Czech weightlifter. He competed for Czechoslovakia in the 1924 Summer Olympics, winning the bronze medal in the lightweight class.
