= Martin Olofsson =

Swedish weightlifter

Personal information
- Nationality: Swedish
- Born: 10 November 1891 Linköping, Sweden
- Died: 11 October 1991 (aged 99) Linköping, Sweden

Sport
- Sport: Weightlifting

Karl Martin Olofsson (10 November 1891 – 11 October 1991) was a Swedish weightlifter. He competed at the Summer Olympics in 1920 and 1924.
