= Rikard Brunn =

Swedish weightlifter

Personal information
- Nationality: Swedish
- Born: 27 May 1893 Stockholm, Sweden
- Died: 5 November 1939 (aged 46) Stockholm, Sweden

Sport
- Sport: Weightlifting

Otto Rikard Brunn (27 May 1893 – 5 November 1939) was a Swedish weightlifter. He competed at the 1920 Summer Olympics and the 1924 Summer Olympics.
