= Harald Kaarmann =

Estonian footballer (1901–1942)

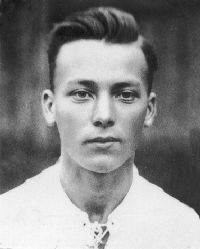
- Kaarmann, c. 1924

Personal information
- Date of birth: 12 December 1901
- Place of birth: Paide, Governorate of Estonia, Russian Empire
- Date of death: 19 August 1942 (aged 40)
- Place of death: Sverdlovsk Oblast, Russian SFSR, Soviet Union
- Position: Midfielder

Senior career*
Years	Team	Apps	(Gls)
1920–1925	JK Tallinna Kalev		
1925–1926	Tallinna Jalgpalliklubi		

International career
1921–1926	Estonia	17	(0)
- * Club domestic league appearances and goals

Harald Kaarmann (after 1935, Harald Kaarma; 12 December 1901 – 19 August 1942) was an Estonian footballer and bandy player.

== Career ==
Kaarma earned 17 caps for the Estonian national team between 1921 and 1926. He spent the majority of his career playing for JK Tallinna Kalev and participated at the 1924 Summer Olympics.

He became an Estonian champion in 1923 with JK Tallinna Kalev and in 1926 with Tallinna JK.

== Death ==
Following the annexation of Estonia by the Soviet Union, he was arrested by the Soviet authorities in the summer of 1941 because of his occupation as an Estonian state policeman and was deported to a labor camp in Sverdlovsk Oblast. Kaarma was executed a year after deportation.

== Honours ==
JK Tallinna Kalev

- Estonian Top Division: 1923

Tallinna JK

- Estonian Top Division: 1926
