= Leopold Treffny =

Austrian weightlifter

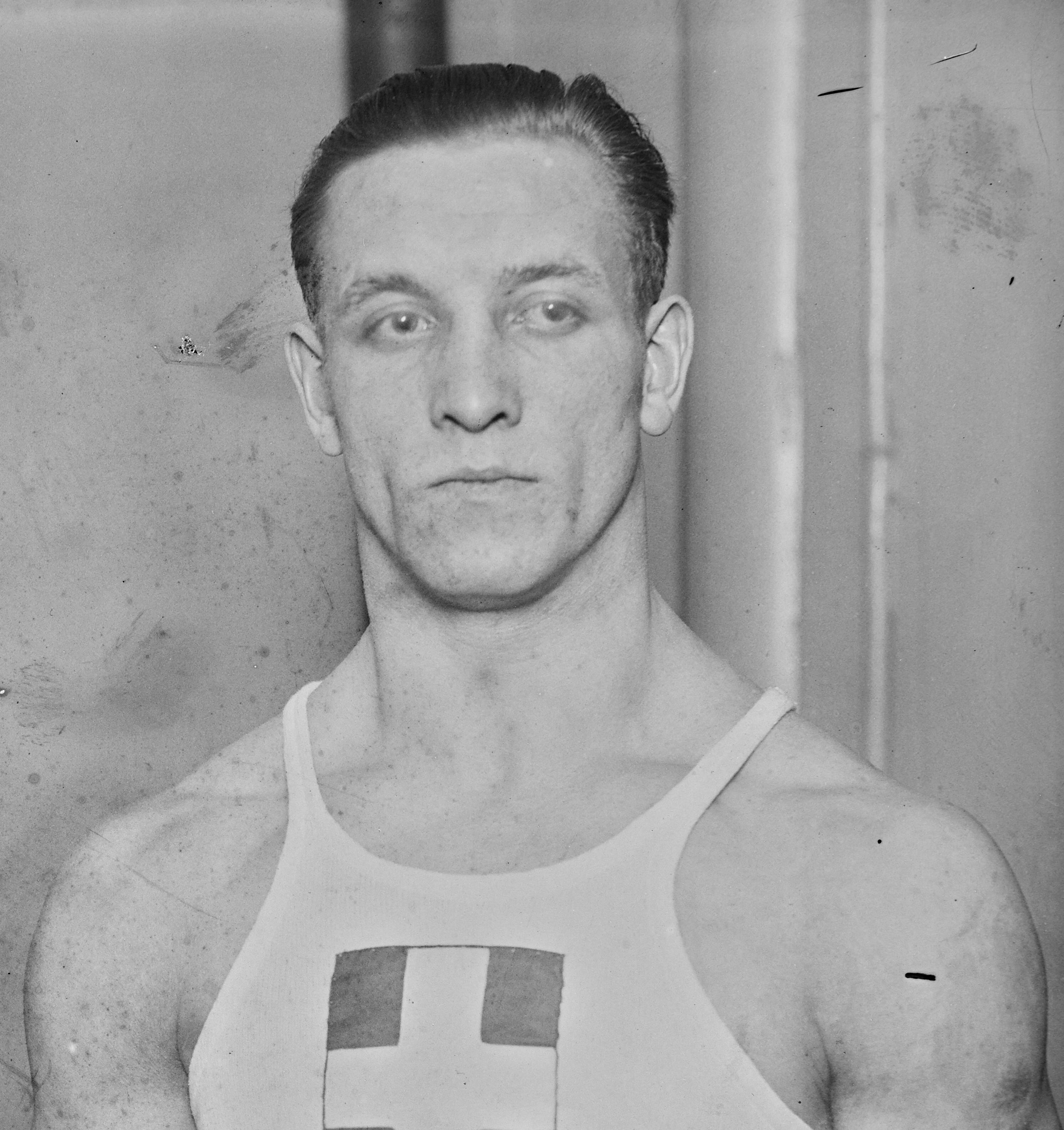
- Leopold Treffny in 1927

Personal information
- Nationality: Austrian
- Born: 10 October 1904 Vienna, Austria-Hungary
- Died: Buenos Aires, Argentina

Sport
- Sport: Weightlifting

Leopold Treffny (born 10 October 1904, date of death unknown) was an Austrian weightlifter. He competed in the men's lightweight event at the 1924 Summer Olympics.
