= Hugo Philipp =

Austrian fencer

Personal information
- Born: 1884
- Died: November 1970 (aged 85–86)

Sport
- Sport: Fencing

Hugo Philipp (1884 – November 1970) was an Austrian fencer. He competed in the team foil competitions at the 1924 Summer Olympics.
