= Reinhold Kesküll =

Estonian sprinter (1900–1943)

Personal information
- Nationality: Estonian
- Born: 26 November 1900 Kingisepp, Russia
- Died: 18 September 1943 (aged 42) Yekaterinburg, Russia

Sport
- Sport: Track and field
- Events: 100m, 200m, 400m

Reinhold Kesküll (26 November 1900 – 18 September 1943) was an Estonian sprinter. He competed in the men's 100 metres, 200 metres and the 400 metres events at the 1924 Summer Olympics. He died in a Soviet prison camp during World War II.
