= Hermann Glück =

Austrian weightlifter

Personal information
- Nationality: Austrian
- Born: 21 December 1903
- Died: 19 March 1979 (aged 75)

Sport
- Sport: Weightlifting

Hermann Glück (21 December 1903 – 19 March 1979) was an Austrian weightlifter. He competed in the men's light-heavyweight event at the 1924 Summer Olympics.
