= Fred O'Connor (soccer) =

American soccer player (1902–1952)

Frederick Edward O’Connor (April 4, 1902 – 1952) was a former U.S. soccer defender. O’Connor earned four caps with the U.S. national team in 1924. His first two caps came in the 1924 Summer Olympics. The U.S. won its first game 1–0 against Estonia, but lost to Uruguay in the quarterfinals. Following its elimination from the tournament, the U.S. played two exhibition games. The U.S. defeated Poland, then lost to the Irish Free State. That was O’Connor's last game with the national team. At the time of the Olympics, he played for Lynn F.C. He was born in Lynn, Massachusetts.
