= Johans Oja =

Latvian sprinter

Personal information
- Nationality: Latvian
- Born: 18 March 1904 Riga, Latvia
- Died: 25 May 1942 (aged 38) Chernivtsi, Soviet Union

Sport
- Sport: Track and field
- Events: 100m, 200m

Johans Oja (18 March 1904 – 25 May 1942) was a Latvian sprinter. He competed in the men's 100 metres and 200 metres events at the 1924 Summer Olympics. A police officer in Riga, he was executed by the Soviet Union in 1942.
