= Arthur Rudd =

English-born American soccer player

Art Rudd
Personal information
- Full name: Arthur George Rudd
- Date of birth: October 22, 1890
- Place of birth: Widnes, England
- Date of death: April 14, 1968 (aged 77)
- Place of death: St. Petersburg, Florida, United States
- Height: 5 ft 10 in (1.78 m)
- Position: Fullback

Senior career*
Years	Team	Apps	(Gls)
1924–1925	Fleisher Yarn	18	(0)
1925–1926	Philadelphia Field Club	19	(0)

International career
1924	United States	2	(0)
- * Club domestic league appearances and goals

Art Rudd (October 22, 1890 – April 14, 1968) was an American soccer defender who earned two caps with the U.S. national team, including one at the 1924 Summer Olympics.

== National team ==
Rudd's first caps came at the 1924 Summer Olympics when he played in the U.S. first round win over Estonia. Following its elimination from the Olympics, the U.S. played two exhibition games. Rudd played in the second, a 3–1 loss to Ireland.

== Professional ==
Rudd also spent two seasons in the American Soccer League. He played eighteen games with Fleisher Yarn in 1924-1925 and another nineteen games with Philadelphia Field Club during the 1925–1926 season.
