= Joseph Jaquenoud =

Swiss weightlifter

Personal information
- Nationality: Swiss
- Born: 1901
- Died: 29 January 1988 (aged 86–87); La Chaux-de-Fonds, Switzerland

Sport
- Sport: Weightlifting

Joseph Jaquenoud (1901 – 29 January 1988) was a Swiss weightlifter. He competed at the 1924 Summer Olympics and the 1928 Summer Olympics.
