= Rudolf Schilberg =

Austrian weightlifter (1894–1961)

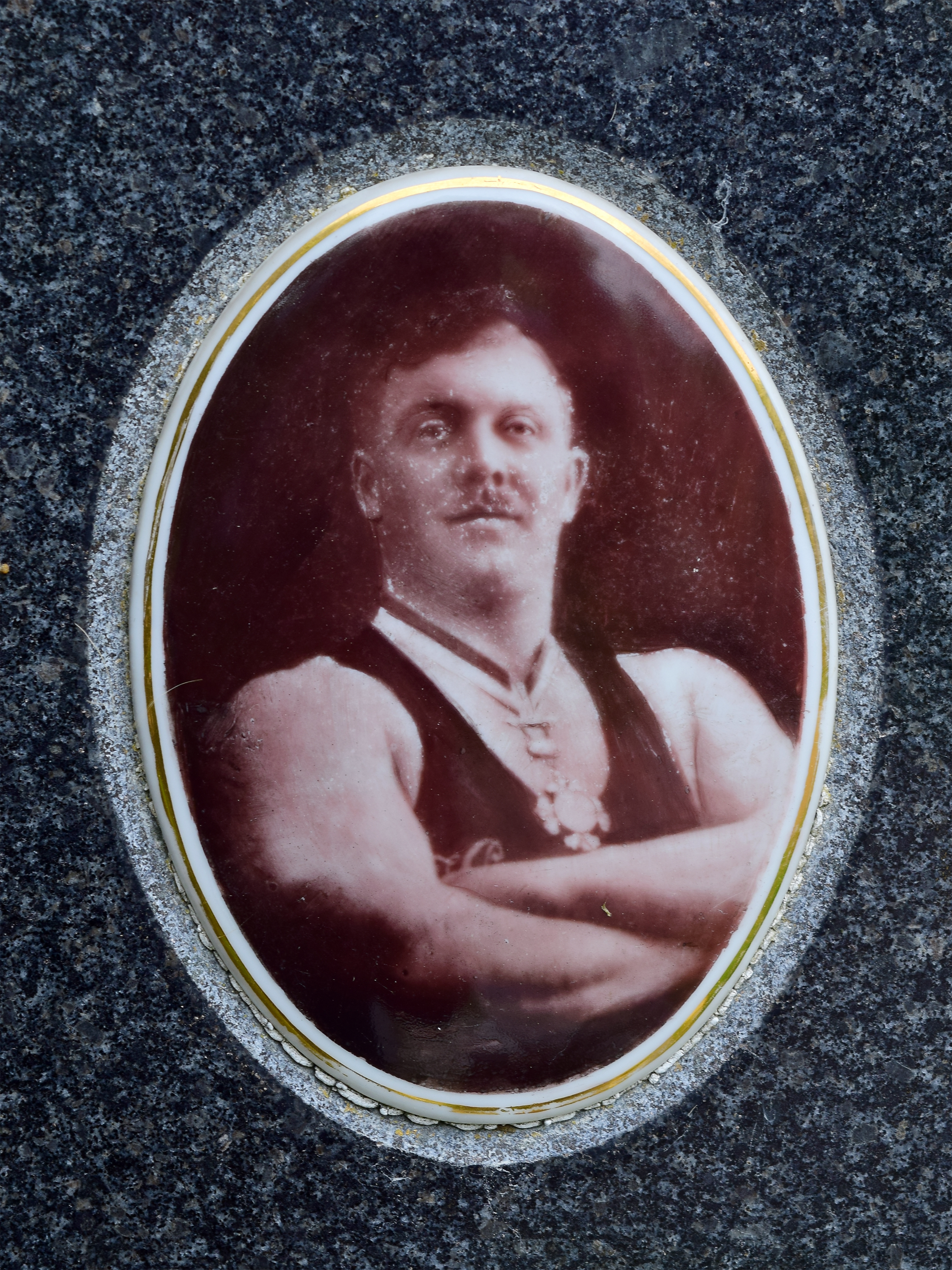
- Image on grave of Rudolf Schilberg in Vienna Central Cemetery

Personal information
- Born: 29 September 1894; Vienna, Austria
- Died: 30 July 1961 (aged 66); Vienna, Austria
- Weight: 114 kg (251 lb)

Sport
- Country: Austria
- Sport: Weightlifting
- Weight class: Heavyweight
- Updated on 12 December 2016

Rudolf Schilberg (29 September 1894 – 30 July 1961) was an Austrian male weightlifter, who competed in the heavyweight category and represented Austria at international competitions. He competed at the 1928 Summer Olympics and 1936 Summer Olympics. In the heavyweight category he set six world records in the press between 1925 and 1931.
