= Raimond Põder =

Estonian footballer

Personal information
- Date of birth: 3 January 1903
- Place of birth: Tallinn, Governorate of Estonia, Russian Empire
- Position: Midfielder

International career
Years	Team	Apps	(Gls)
1920	Estonia	1	(0)

Raimond Põder (born 3 January 1903, date of death unknown) was an Estonian footballer. He played in one match for the Estonia national football team in 1920. He was also part of Estonia's squad for the football tournament at the 1924 Summer Olympics, but he did not play in any matches.
