= Hendrik Verheijen =

Dutch weightlifter

Personal information
- Nationality: Dutch
- Born: 16 March 1899; The Hague, Netherlands
- Died: 18 December 1967 (aged 68); The Hague, Netherlands

Sport
- Sport: Weightlifting

Hendrik Verheijen (16 March 1899 – 18 December 1967) was a Dutch weightlifter. He competed in the men's heavyweight event at the 1928 Summer Olympics.

Hendrik's brothers, Minus and Jan Verheijen, were also weightlifters. All three brothers competed in weightlifting events at the 1928 Summer Olympics, where Jan was the only brother to win a medal, a bronze in the light heavyweight division.
