= Johannes Kauba =

Estonian sport personnel

Johannes Kauba (28 September 1886 – 21 February 1939) was an Estonian sports figure.

He was born in Rakvere. He studied at St. Petersburg University.

He started his sport training in 1901 in Rakvere. Kauba excelled at weightlifting, wrestling, swimming, skiing, and racewalking. In St. Petersburg he was a member on sport club Palma, and he was one of the founder of sport club Wõimula (established in 1906). He was a member of Russian and St. Petersburg Olympic committee, and represented Russia in 1912 Summer Olympics in Stockholm. He also acted as a judge in wrestling, weightlifting, athletics, skiing, skating, swimming, and sport shooting.

1922–1923 he was the chairman of Estonian Sport Association (Estonian: Eesti Spordi Liit). 1923–1933 he was active in sport organization EKRAVE Association (Estonian: EKRAVE Liit).

He was chief editor of magazine Staadion.
