= Voldemar Rõks =

Estonian footballer (1900–1941)

Personal information
- Date of birth: 15 July 1900
- Place of birth: Särevere, Governorate of Estonia, Russian Empire
- Date of death: 27 December 1941 (aged 41)
- Place of death: Solikamsk, Perm Oblast, Russian SFSR, Soviet Union
- Position: Midfielder

Senior career*
Years	Team	Apps	(Gls)
1923–1924	JK Tallinna Kalev		

International career
1923–1924	Estonia	2	(0)
- * Club domestic league appearances and goals

Voldemar Rõks (15 July 1900 – 27 December 1941) was an Estonian footballer. He studied economics at the University of Tartu between 1921 and 1924, but never graduated. Rõks worked as a procurator for Bank of Estonia.

== Career ==
Rõks earned 2 caps for the Estonian national team in 1924. He spent his brief career playing for JK Tallinna Kalev and participated at the 1924 Summer Olympics.

He became an Estonian champion in 1923 with JK Tallinna Kalev. He was arrested by the Soviet authorities and was deported to a labor camp in Perm Oblast. He died there due to an illness and hunger.

== Honours ==
JK Tallinna Kalev

- Estonian Top Division: 1923
