= Johannes Lello =

Estonian footballer

Personal information
- Date of birth: 25 November 1895
- Place of birth: Jõgeva, Estonia
- Date of death: 26 November 1976 (aged 81)

International career
Years	Team	Apps	(Gls)
1924	Estonia	3	(0)

Johannes Lello (25 November 1895 – 26 November 1976) was an Estonian footballer. He played in three matches for the Estonia national football team in 1924. Lello was part of the Estonian team at the 1924 Summer Olympics in Paris.
