= Gustav Becker (weightlifter) =

Austrian weightlifter

Personal information
- Nationality: Austrian

Sport
- Sport: Weightlifting

Gustav Becker was an Austrian weightlifter. He competed in the men's heavyweight event at the 1924 Summer Olympics.
