= Otto Silber =

Estonian footballer

Personal information
- Date of birth: 17 March 1893
- Place of birth: Tallinn, Governorate of Estonia, Russian Empire
- Date of death: 23 December 1940 (aged 47)
- Place of death: Saue, then part of Estonian SSR, Soviet Union

International career
Years	Team	Apps	(Gls)
1920–1926	Estonia	20	(0)

Otto Silber (17 March 1893 – 23 December 1940) was an Estonian footballer. He competed in the men's tournament at the 1924 Summer Olympics.

Silber participated in the first official football game between Tallinn clubs JS Meteor and Merkur on 6 April 1909 (on the Meteor side). A defender, Silber played in the Estonia national football team between 1920 and 1926, captaining Estonia's first international match against Finland in 1920. He was a founder player in the club Tallinna JK from 1921 to 1925, later becoming a board member. He was also a referee.

Silber, a former soldier in the First World War and Estonian War of Independence, was, following the Soviet annexation of his country in 1940, arrested by the NKVD and executed in Saue, Estonia in December 1940 aged 47, although he was alternatively reported to have died in a motor car accident. He is buried in the Defence Forces Cemetery of Tallinn, Estonia.
