= Anton Zwerina =

Austrian weightlifter (1900–1973)

Personal information
- Born: 7 June 1900
- Died: 19 May 1973 (aged 72)
Medal record
Men's weightlifting
| Silver medal – second place | 1924 Paris | -67.5 kg |

Anton Zwerina (7 June 1900 – 19 May 1973) was an Austrian weightlifter who competed at the 1924 Summer Olympics. He won a silver medal in the lightweight class.
