= Harold Wood (weightlifter) =

British weightlifter

Personal information
- Nationality: British
- Born: 18 January 1889
- Died: 25 January 1954 (aged 65)

Sport
- Sport: Weightlifting

Harold Wood (18 January 1889 – 25 January 1954) was a British weightlifter. He competed at the 1924 Summer Olympics and the 1928 Summer Olympics.
