= Eduard Vanaaseme =

Estonian weightlifter (1898–1991)

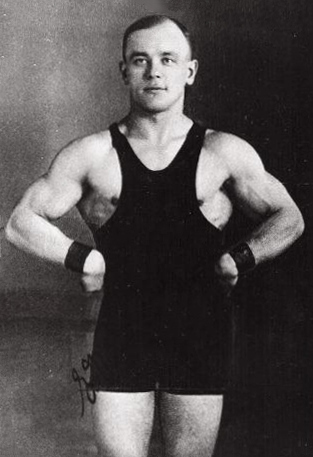

Personal information
- Born: 25 July 1898 Tartu, Estonia
- Died: 2 March 1991 (aged 92) Tallinn, Estonia
- Weight: 66 kg (146 lb)

Sport
- Sport: Weightlifting
- Club: Kalev Tartu
Medal record
Representing Estonia
World Championships
Silver medal – second place	1922 Tallinn	-67.5 kg

Eduard Vanaaseme (25 July 1898 – 2 March 1991) was an Estonian lightweight weightlifter. In 1922 he won a national title and a silver medal at the world championships, and set an unofficial world record in press. He placed sixth at the 1924 Summer Olympics. After retiring from competitions he worked as a bookbinder and acted as a weightlifting referee.
