= Charles Rigoulot =

French weightlifter

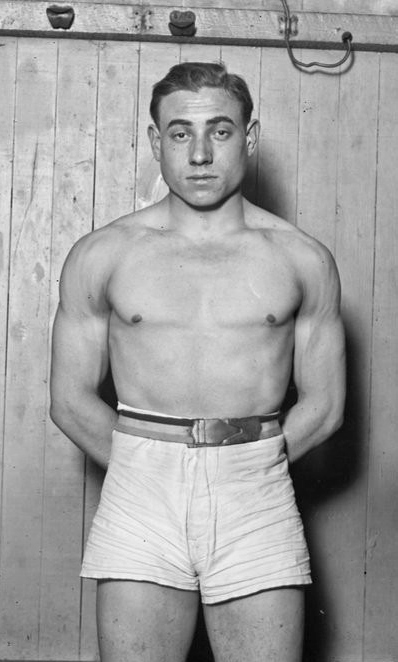
- Charles Rigoulot in 1923

Personal information
- Born: 3 November 1903 Le Vésinet, France
- Died: 22 August 1962 (aged 58) Paris, France
- Height: 1.73 m (5 ft 8 in)
- Weight: 82 kg (181 lb)

Sport
- Sport: Weightlifting
Medal record
Representing France
Olympic Games
Gold medal – first place	1924 Paris	82.5 kg

Charles Rigoulot
- Nationality: French

24 Hours of Le Mans career
- Years: 1937
- Teams: Yves Giraud-Cabantous
- Best finish: DNF (1937)
- Class wins: 0

Charles Jean Rigoulot (3 November 1903 – 22 August 1962) was a French weightlifter, professional wrestler, racing driver, strongman and actor.

Rigoulot was born in Le Vesinet, France and began to train with weights as a child. He was observed by weight trainer Jean Dame lifting heavy lithograph stones when Rigoulot was 16-years-old and Dame began to train and coach the teenager.

== Weightlifting and strongman career ==
As a weightlifter he won the gold medal in the 82.5 kg (188.9 lb) division at the 1924 Summer Olympics. Between 1923 and 1926 he set eight official world records. In 1924, he became the first person to clean and jerk more than 400 pounds (181 kg), using the non-revolving barbells of that time. In 1928 he set two World Records; a clean and jerk of 360 lbs (163.3 kg) and a snatch of 253 lbs (114.8 kg). In 1930, he became the first person to complete an overhead lift of the Apollon Railway Car Wheels, an awkwardly-shaped 166 kg (366 lb) barbell-shaped set of train wheels used by the stage strongman Louis Uni, and the predecessor of "Apollon's Axle".

In 1925 Rigoulot turned professional and worked as a strongman in the circus, and an actor and singer in the theater. In the first year of his career as a professional weightlifter Rigolout took part in a show challenge against Ernest Cadine at the Cirque d'hiver in Paris. Cadine was the former Olympic champion of weightlifting in the 82.5 kg division at the 1920 Summer Olympics. They came to an agreement to do their contest in order of Olympic-style weightlifting with 10 attempts for each, 5 in snatch and 5 in clean and jerk. Rigoulot won the challenge with 1,082 kg (2,385.4 lb) against 1,077.5 kg (2375.5 lb) by Cadine and reached the highest two arms results with 120.5 kg (265.7 lb) in snatch and 156 kg (344 lb) in clean and jerk. In 1932 he became a professional wrestler and was billed as "l'homme le plus fort dans le monde" ("the strongest man in the world") and had matches with Henri DeGlane and Strangler Lewis.

== Motorsports career results ==
As a driver, he competed in the 1937 Le Mans race.

=== 24 Hours of Le Mans results ===
24 Hours of Le Mans results
Year	Team	Co-Drivers	Car	Class	Laps	Pos.	Class Pos.
1937	(France) Yves Giraud-Cabantous	(France) Yves Giraud-Cabantous	Chenard et Walcker	1.1	151	DNF	DNF

== Later life ==
During World War II he was imprisoned after hitting a Nazi officer and set free after France was liberated.

In 1953 he became sports director at the Cognac Distillery Ricard; he died of a heart attack in 1962. His daughter Dany Rigoulot became a winter Olympic figure skater.
