= Claudius Dutriève =

French weightlifter

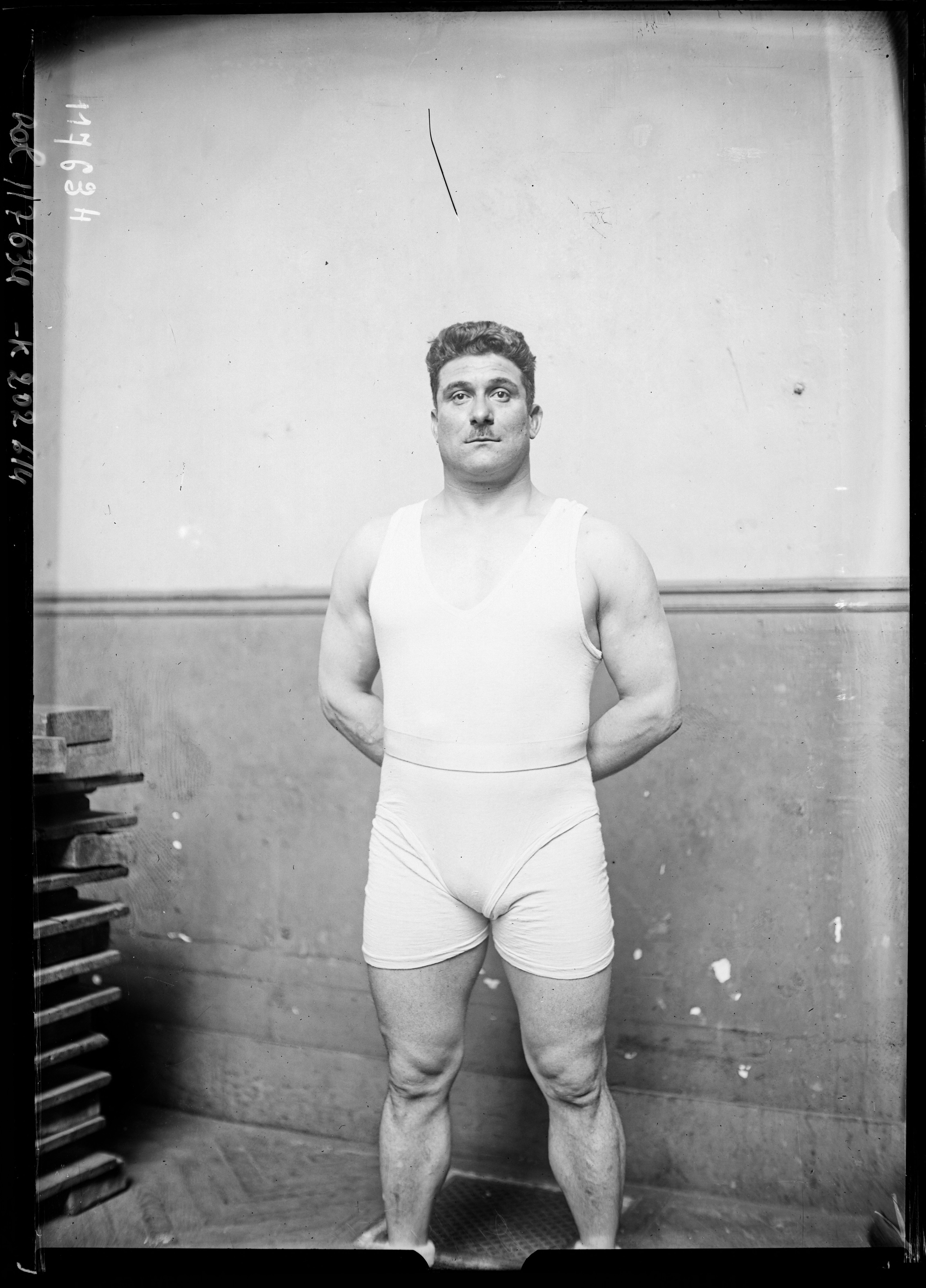
- Claudius Dutriève in 1927

Personal information
- Nationality: French
- Born: 21 February 1891
- Died: 21 September 1960 (aged 69)

Sport
- Sport: Weightlifting

Claudius Dutriève (21 February 1891 – 21 September 1960) was a French weightlifter. He competed at the 1924 Summer Olympics and the 1928 Summer Olympics.
