= Leopold Friedrich =

Austrian weightlifter (1898–1962)

Medal record

Men's weightlifting

Representing Austria

Olympic Games
Bronze medal – third place	1924 Paris	-82.5 kg

Leopold Friedrich (1 January 1898 – 1962) was an Austrian weightlifter who competed in the 1924 Summer Olympics. He won a bronze medal in the light-heavyweight class.
