= Saul Hallap =

Estonian weightlifter (1897–1941)

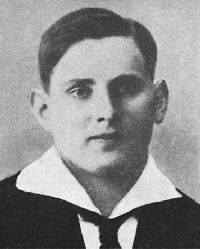

Personal information
- Born: 10 December 1897 Hino, Estonia
- Died: 18 July 1941 (aged 43) Umbusi, Estonia
- Height: 172 cm (5 ft 8 in)
- Weight: 79 kg (174 lb)

Sport
- Sport: Weightlifting
- Club: Kalev Tartu
Medal record
Representing Estonia
World Championships
Gold medal – first place	1922 Tallinn	-75 kg

Saul Hallap (10 December 1897 – 18 July 1941) was an Estonian middleweight weightlifter who won a world title in 1922 and placed ninth at the 1924 Summer Olympics. After retiring from competitions he worked as a circus performer and masseur. He was killed during World War II together with his partner, the circus acrobat Alma Kaal. Since 2002 a memorial weightlifting tournament has been held in Tartu in his honor.
