= Giuseppe Tonani =

Italian weightlifter

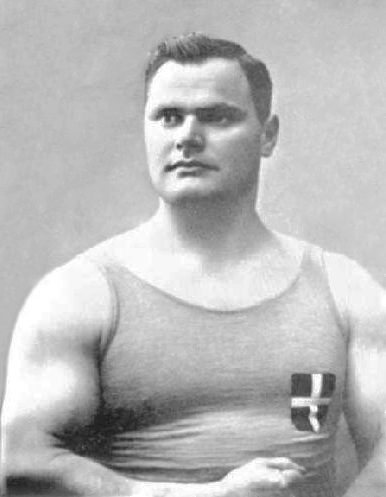

Personal information
- Born: 2 October 1890 Milan, Italy
- Died: 1 October 1971 (aged 80) Milan, Italy
- Weight: 109 kg (240 lb)

Sport
- Sport: Weightlifting
- Club: APEF Milan
Medal record
Representing Italy
Olympic Games
Gold medal – first place	1924 Paris	+82.5 kg

Giuseppe Luigi Tonani (2 October 1890 – 1 October 1971) was an Italian heavyweight weightlifter who won a gold medal at the 1924 Olympics, placing seventh in 1928. Earlier in 1920, he was part of the Italian Olympics tug of war team.
