= Voldemar Noormägi =

Estonian weightlifter (1895–1967)

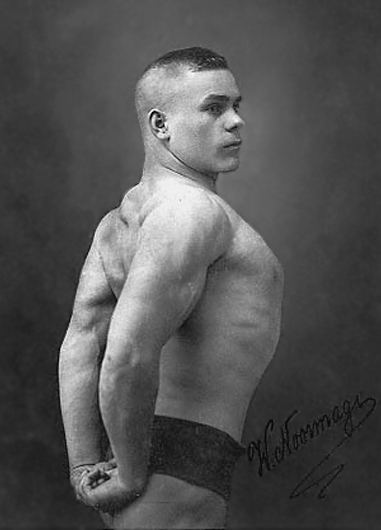

Personal information
- Born: 10 August 1895 Kingisepp, Russia
- Died: 28 May 1968 (aged 72) Ala, Helme Parish, Valga County, Estonia

Sport
- Sport: Weightlifting
- Club: Kalev Tallinn
Medal record
Representing Estonia
World Championships
Bronze medal – third place	1922 Tallinn	-67.5 kg

Voldemar Noormägi (10 August 1895 – 28 May 1968) was an Estonian lightweight weightlifter who won a bronze medal at the 1922 World Championships and placed 22nd at the 1924 Summer Olympics. In 1923–24, he set three unofficial world records in snatch.

Noormägi was born deaf and was inspired to begin weightlifting in 1909, when an Estonian professional wrestler and weightlifter Georg Lurich visited his school. Noormägi won the national lightweight title in 1923 and 1927, but at the 1924 World Championships, he injured his hand and failed to finish. While working as a photographer in Tallinn and Narva he became religious and lost interest in sport. He came to believe that sport is a sin.
