= Josef Leppelt =

Austrian weightlifter (1900–1950)

Personal information
- Nationality: Austrian
- Born: 19 March 1900
- Died: 26 November 1950 (aged 50)

Sport
- Sport: Weightlifting

Josef Leppelt (19 March 1900 – 26 November 1950) was an Austrian weightlifter. He competed at the 1924 Summer Olympics and the 1928 Summer Olympics.
