= Franz Aigner (weightlifter) =

Austrian weightlifter (1892–1970)

Personal information
- Born: 24 January 1892
- Died: 21 January 1970 (aged 77)
- Weight: 107 kg (236 lb)
Medal record
Men's weightlifting
Representing Austria
Olympic Games
Silver medal – second place	1924 Paris	+82.5 kg

Franz Aigner (24 January 1892 – 21 January 1970) was an Austrian weightlifter who competed in the 1924 Summer Olympics. He won a silver medal in the heavyweight class.
