= Karl Freiberger =

Austrian weightlifter (1902–1977)

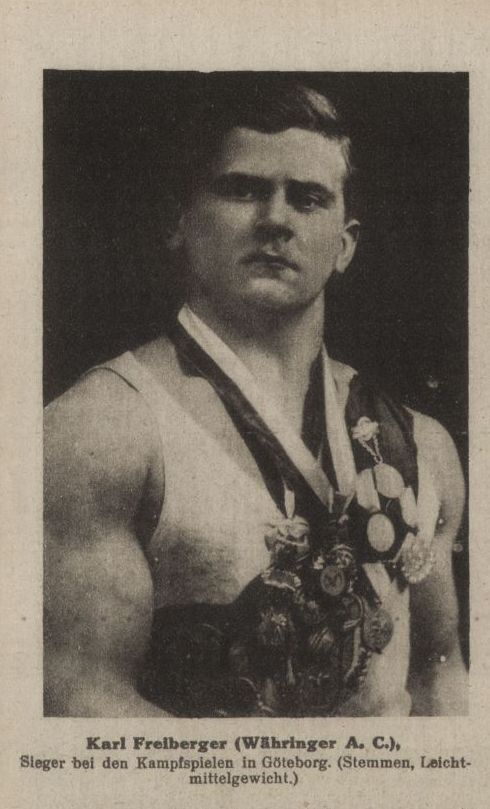

Personal information
- Nationality: Austrian
- Born: 1902
- Died: 1977

Sport
- Sport: Weightlifting

Karl Freiberger (6 February 1902 – 22 September 1977) was an Austrian weightlifter. He competed at the 1924 Summer Olympics and the 1928 Summer Olympics.
