= Harald Tammer =

Estonian weightlifter

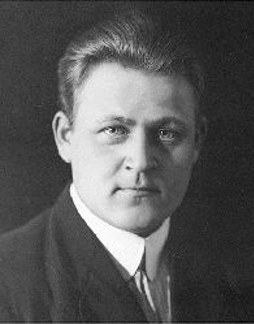

Personal information
- Born: 9 January 1899 Tallinn, Estonia
- Died: 6 June 1942 (aged 43) Unzhlag Gulag prison camp, Soviet Union

Sport
- Sport: Weightlifting, athletics
- Events: Shot put, discus throw, hammer throw
- Club: Kalev Tallinn

Achievements and titles
- Personal bests: SP – 14.15 m (1922); DT – 41.06 m (1920); HT – 37.18 m (1923)
Medal record
Representing Estonia
Weightlifting
Olympic Games
Bronze medal – third place	1924 Paris	+82.5 kg
World Championships
Gold medal – first place	1922 Tallinn	+82.5 kg

Harald Tammer (9 January 1899 – 6 June 1942) was an Estonian journalist, athlete and weightlifter. As a heavyweight weightlifter he won a world title in 1922 and a bronze medal at the 1924 Olympics. As an athlete he competed in the shot put at the 1920 and 1924 Olympics and came sixth and twelfth, respectively. He served as the Olympic flag bearer for Estonia in 1920, and as a representative of the Estonian Olympic team in 1928 and 1936.

== Career ==
In 1915 Tammer graduated from Tallinn Commerce School and joined the Sports Association Kalev. Next year he placed within the podium at the Russian championships in shot put, discus throw and hammer throw. Soon after that he volunteered to fight in World War I and Estonian War of Independence as member of the Estonian Defence Leagues Kalevlaste Maleva Battalion in Tallinn. After demobilization, from 1921 to 1928 he edited the Estonian sports newspaper Eesti Spordileht, and in 1923–33 was a journalist and in 1933–1940 editor-in-chief of Eesti Päevaleht. In 1928–40 he was a board member of Estonian Journalists Union, and in 1934–35 headed the Baltic Journalists Union. Tammer studied law and diplomacy at the École Libre des Sciences Politiques in Paris in 1931–33. He was also a board member of the Estonian National Olympic Committee in 1933–40, and of the Estonian Parliament in 1937–40. In 1940 he briefly worked as editor of the magazine Revue Baltique. Next year he was accused of spying for the Estonian Defence Forces and deported to Russia. He died in 1942 in the Unzhlag corrective labor camp (part of the Gulag prison system).

== Awards ==
- 21 February 1940 Order of the Estonian Red Cross II class (et: Eesti Punase Risti Teenetemärk II klass)
- 18 June 1936 Order of the Estonian Red Cross II class I (et:Eesti Punase Risti mälestusmärk II järgu I aste)
- 1924 Order of Lāčplēsis nr.3/1816
