= Kārlis Leilands =

Latvian weightlifter (1895–1961)

Personal information
- Nationality: Latvian
- Born: 27 November 1895 Bērzmuižas pagasts, Dobeles apriņķis, Kurzemes guberņa, Russian Empire (now Latvia)
- Died: 12 December 1961 (aged 66) Minneapolis, Minnesota, U.S.

Sport
- Sport: Weightlifting

Kārlis Leilands (27 November 1895 – 12 December 1961) was a Latvian weightlifter. He competed at the 1924 Summer Olympics and the 1928 Summer Olympics.
