= Netherlands at the 1924 Summer Olympics =

- Flag of the Netherlands
- IOC code: NED
- NOC: Dutch Olympic Committee

in Paris
- Competitors: 177 (168 men and 9 women) in 17 sports
- Medals Ranked 9th: Gold 4 Silver 1 Bronze 5 Total 10

Summer Olympics appearances (overview)
- 1900; 1904; 1908; 1912; 1920; 1924; 1928; 1932; 1936; 1948; 1952; 1956; 1960; 1964; 1968; 1972; 1976; 1980; 1984; 1988; 1992; 1996; 2000; 2004; 2008; 2012; 2016; 2020; 2024

Other related appearances
- 1906 Intercalated Games

Athletes from the Netherlands competed at the 1924 Summer Olympics in Paris, France. 177 competitors, 168 men and 9 women, took part in 81 events in 17 sports.

== Medalists ==
Medal	Name	Sport	Event	Date
Gold	Ko Willems	Cycling	Men's 50 km	July 27
Gold	Adolph van der Voort van Zijp	Equestrian	Individual eventing	July 26
Gold	Antonius Colenbrander, Gerard de Kruijff, Charles Pahud de Mortanges, Adolph van der Voort van Zijp	Equestrian	Team eventing	July 26
Gold	Teun Beijnen, Willy Rösingh	Rowing	Men's coxless pair	July 17
Silver	Jaap Meijer	Cycling	Men's sprint	July 27
Bronze	Jan de Vries, Jaap Boot, Harry Broos, Rinus van den Berge	Athletics	Men's 4 × 100 m relay	July 13
Bronze	Gerard Bosch van Drakestein, Maurice Peeters	Cycling	Men's tandem	July 27
Bronze	Adrianus de Jong, Jetze Doorman, Hendrik Scherpenhuijzen, Jan van der Wiel, Maarten van Dulm, Henri Wijnoldy-Daniëls	Fencing	Men's team sabre	July 15
Bronze	Johan Carp, Anthonij Guépin, Jan Vreede	Sailing	6 m Class	July 26
Bronze	Kea Bouman, Hendrik Timmer	Tennis	Mixed doubles	July 21

== Athletics ==
Nineteen athletes represented the Netherlands in 1924. It was the nation's fourth appearance in the sport. The 4x100 metre relay team won the nation's first Olympic athletics medal, a bronze. That team had also matched the world record in the event in the quarterfinal heats, though teams in later quarterfinals and the semifinals bettered the record.

Ranks given are within the heat.

Athlete	Event	Heats		Quarterfinals		Semifinals		Final	
Athlete	Event	Result	Rank	Result	Rank	Result	Rank	Result	Rank
Wim Bolten	400 m	53.0	3	Did not advance					
Jaap Boot	Long jump	N/A				6.86	2	Did not advance	
Harry Broos	100 m	11.0	1 Q	11.1	3	Did not advance			
Harry Broos	200 m	22.6	1 Q	Unknown	5	Did not advance			
Cornelis Brouwer	Marathon	N/A						Did not finish	
Hannes de Boer	Long jump	N/A				No mark	6	Did not advance	
Harry de Keijser	Pole vault	N/A				3.40	7	Did not advance	
Harry de Keijser	Pentathlon	N/A						Elim-3	
Harry de Keijser	Decathlon	N/A						6509.610	10
Jan de Vries	200 m	23.2	3	Did not advance					
Henk Kamerbeek	Hammer throw	N/A				No mark	15	Did not advance	
Wim Kat	400 m	51.8	3	Did not advance					
Harry Keemink	10 km walk	N/A				Disqualified		Did not advance	
Frederik Lamp	100 m	Unknown	3	Did not advance					
Menso Johannes Menso	400 m	Unknown	4	Did not advance					
Menso Johannes Menso	800 m	N/A		Unknown	5	Did not advance			
Adriaan Paulen	400 m	52.0	2 Q	49.0	1 Q	48.2	4	Did not advance	
Adriaan Paulen	800 m	N/A		1:59.2	1 Q	1:58.8	4	Did not advance	
Willem Peters	Triple jump	N/A				13.86	6	Did not advance	
Teunis Sprong	Marathon	N/A						Did not finish	
Rinus van den Berge	100 m	11.1	2 Q	Unknown	4	Did not advance			
Rinus van den Berge	200 m	23.1	4	Unknown	6	Did not advance			
Johannes van Kampen	100 m	Unknown	2 Q	Unknown	3	Did not advance			
Johannes van Kampen	200 m	23.1	4	Did not advance					
Oscar van Rappard	110 m hurdles	N/A		Unknown	2 Q	Unknown	4	Did not advance	
Oscar van Rappard	400 m hurdles	N/A		Unknown	5	Did not advance			
Jan Zeegers	1500 m	N/A				4:21.0	4	Did not advance	
Jan Zeegers	5000 m	N/A				Unknown	6	Did not advance	
Jaap Boot; Harry Broos; Jan de Vries; Rinus van den Berge	4 × 100 m relay	N/A		42.0 =WR	1 Q	42.2	1 Q	42.8	3rd place, bronze medalist(s)

== Boxing ==
Nine boxers represented the Netherlands at the 1924 Games. It was the nation's second appearance in the sport. De Best's bye in the round of 16 and quarterfinal win made him the first Dutch boxer to reach the semifinals; he lost his semifinal and bronze medal bouts to take fourth place.

Boxer	Weight class	Round of 32	Round of 16	Quarterfinals	Semifinals	Final / Bronze match	
Boxer	Weight class	Opposition Score	Opposition Score	Opposition Score	Opposition Score	Opposition Score	Rank
Ko Cornelissen	Welterweight	Pedersen (NOR); W	Dwyer (IRL); L	Did not advance			9
Jan Dam	Welterweight	Bye	Ingram (RSA); L	Did not advance			9
Henk de Best	Heavyweight	N/A	Bye	Larsen (DEN); W	Petersen (DEN); L	Porzio (ARG); L	4
Huub Huizenaar	Lightweight	Sinclair (AUS); L	Did not advance				17
Herman Levij	Featherweight	Bye	Salas (USA); L	Did not advance			9
Louis Meeuwessen	Middleweight	Jensen (NOR); L	Did not advance				17
Karel Miljon	Light heavyweight	Mitchell (GBR); L	Did not advance				17
Arij Smit	Bantamweight	Bye	Barber (GBR); L	Did not advance			9
Leo Turksma	Flyweight	Bye	McKenzie (GBR); L	Did not advance			9

Opponent nation	Wins	Losses	Percent
Argentina	0	1	.000
Australia	0	1	.000
Denmark	1	1	.500
Great Britain	0	3	.000
Ireland	0	1	.000
Norway	1	1	.500
South Africa	0	1	.000
United States	0	1	.000
Total	2	10	.167

Round	Wins	Losses	Percent
Round of 32	1	3	.000
Round of 16	0	5	.000
Quarterfinals	1	0	1.000
Semifinals	0	1	.000
Final	0	0	–
Bronze match	0	1	.000
Total	2	10	.167

== Cycling ==
Ten cyclists represented the Netherlands in 1924. It was the nation's third appearance in the sport. The Dutch cyclists won three medals, one of each color and one in each of three different events.

Willems won the 50 kilometre title, aided by a well-planned and well-executed early attack by Maas. Peeters, the defending sprint champion, was unable to advance to the semifinals; Meijer was nearly able to take the title himself, finishing second in the final to win silver. Peeters did win a medal, however, taking the tandem bronze along with Bosch.

=== Road cycling ===
Cyclist	Event	Final	
Cyclist	Event	Result	Rank
Cor Heeren	Time trial	6:41:50.8	13
Philippus Innemee	Time trial	7:04:32.0	26
Jan Maas	Time trial	6:51:05.0	19
Martinus Vlietman	Time trial	7:07:32.4	29
Cor Heeren; Philippus Innemee; Jan Maas; Martinus Vlietman	Team time trial	20:37:27.8	6

=== Track cycling ===
Ranks given are within the heat.

Cyclist	Event	First round		First repechage		Quarterfinals		Second repechage		Semifinals		Final	
Cyclist	Event	Result	Rank	Result	Rank	Result	Rank	Result	Rank	Result	Rank	Result	Rank
Jan Maas	50 km	N/A										Unknown	7
Jacob Meijer	Sprint	13.2	1 Q	Advanced directly		13.2	1 Q	Advanced directly		12.8	1 Q	Unknown	2nd place, silver medalist(s)
Maurice Peeters	Sprint	17.0	1 Q	Advanced directly		Unknown	2 r	Unknown	2	Did not advance			
Ko Willems	50 km	N/A										1:18:24.0	1st place, gold medalist(s)
Gerard Bosch van Drakestein; Maurice Peeters	Tandem	N/A								12.6	1 Q	Unknown	3rd place, bronze medalist(s)
Gerard Bosch; Jan Maas; Simon van Poelgeest; Franciscus Waterreus	Team pursuit	Unknown	2	N/A		Did not advance		N/A		Did not advance			

== Diving ==
Four divers, two men and two women, represented the Netherlands in 1924. It was the nation's debut in the sport.

Ranks given are within the heat.

Men

Diver	Event	Semifinals			Final		
Diver	Event	Points	Score	Rank	Points	Score	Rank
Henk Hemsing	3 m board	14	455.2	2 Q	39	490.8	8
Henk Hemsing	10 m platform	30	306	6	Did not advance		
Henk Hemsing	Plain high diving	39	94	8	Did not advance		
Henk Lotgering	3 m board	25	459.2	5	Did not advance		
Henk Lotgering	10 m platform	30	303	6	Did not advance		
Henk Lotgering	Plain high diving	32.5	116	7	Did not advance		

Women

Diver	Event	Semifinals			Final		
Diver	Event	Points	Score	Rank	Points	Score	Rank
Hendrika Bante	3 m board	35	270.6	7	Did not advance		
Truus Klapwijk	3 m board	28	287.3	6	Did not advance		

== Equestrian ==
Five equestrians represented the Netherlands in 1924. It was the nation's second appearance in the sport. The Dutch riders won both the individual and team eventing gold medals, with Adolf van der Voort van Zijp taking the individual honor. They were the first Olympic equestrian medals won by the Netherlands.

Equestrian	Event	Final		
Equestrian	Event	Score	Time	Rank
Antonius Colenbrander	Eventing	952.5	N/A	25
Gerard de Kruijff	Eventing	1493.5	N/A	13
Charles Pahud de Mortanges	Eventing	1828.0	N/A	4
Adolf van der Voort van Zijp	Eventing	1976.0	N/A	1st place, gold medalist(s)
Jan van Reede	Dressage	232.0	N/A	14
Antonius Colenbrander; Gerard de Kruijff; Charles Pahud de Mortanges; Adolf van der Voort van Zijp	Team eventing	5927.5	N/A	1st place, gold medalist(s)

== Fencing ==
17 fencers, 14 men and 3 women, represented the Netherlands in 1924. It was the nation's fifth appearance in the sport as well as the Games; the Netherlands was one of nine nations to send women to the first Olympic women's fencing competition. For the third straight Games, the Dutch sabre team took bronze.

Men

Ranks given are within the pool.

Fencer	Event	Round 1		Round 2		Quarterfinals		Semifinals		Final	
Fencer	Event	Result	Rank	Result	Rank	Result	Rank	Result	Rank	Result	Rank
Wouter Brouwer	Épée	5–4	3 Q	N/A		2–7	8	Did not advance			
Jan de Beaufort	Épée	4–5	7	N/A		Did not advance					
Adrianus de Jong	Foil	2–2	3 Q	1–4	5	Did not advance					
Adrianus de Jong	Sabre	N/A				4–1	1 Q	5–3	4	4–3	5
Cornelis Ekkart	Sabre	N/A				3–3	5	Did not advance			
Willem Hubert van Blijenburgh	Épée	4–4	2 Q	N/A		4–6	7	Did not advance			
Paul Kunze	Foil	1–1	2 Q	1–4	5	Did not advance					
Nicolaas Nederpeld	Foil	Bye		1–4	4	Did not advance					
Jan van der Wiel	Sabre	N/A				3–3	5	Did not advance			
Maarten van Dulm	Sabre	N/A				2–3	4 Q	2–6	8	Did not advance	
Pieter van Boven	Épée	4–5	6 Q	N/A		1–8	9	Did not advance			
Adrianus de Jong; Paul Kunze; Nicolaas Nederpeld; Félix Vigeveno; Henri Wijnoldy-Daniëls	Team foil	0–2	3	N/A		Did not advance					
Wouter Brouwer; Jan de Beaufort; Adrianus de Jong; Willem Hubert; Pieter van Boven; Henri Wijnoldy-Daniëls	Team épée	2–1	2 Q	N/A		0–2	3	Did not advance			
Adrianus De Jong; Jetze Doorman; Hendrik Scherpenhuijzen; Jan Van Der Wiel; Maarten Van Dulm; Henri Wyjnoldy-Daniels	Team sabre	3–0	1 Q	N/A		1–1	2 Q	1–0	2 Q	1–2	3rd place, bronze medalist(s)

Women

Ranks given are within the pool.

Fencer	Event	Quarterfinals		Semifinals		Final	
Fencer	Event	Result	Rank	Result	Rank	Result	Rank
Adriana Admiraal-Meijerink	Foil	1–4	5	Did not advance			
Johanna de Boer	Foil	1–4	5	Did not advance			
Johanna Stokhuyzen-de Jong	Foil	0–6	7	Did not advance			

== Football ==
The Netherlands competed in the Olympic football tournament for the fourth time in 1924. The three-time defending bronze medalists once again reached the bronze medal game; this time, however, they lost.

Round 1
Bye

Round 2

May 27, 1924

Netherlands	6–0	Romania
Hurgronje 8'; Pijl 32' 52' 66' 68' de Natris 69' (pen.)	Report

Stade Olympique, Colombes
Attendance: 1,000
Referee: F. Herren (SUI)

Quarterfinals

June 2, 1924

Netherlands	2–1 (a.e.t.)	Irish Free State
Formenoy 7' 104'	Report	Ghent 33'

Stade de Paris
Attendance: 2,000
Referee: Heinrich Retschury (AUT)

Semifinals

June 6, 1924

Uruguay	2–1	Netherlands
Cea 62'; Scarone 81' (pen.)	Report	Pijl 32'

Stade Olympique, Colombes
Attendance: 40,000
Referee: G. Vallat (FRA)

Bronze medal match

June 8, 1924

Sweden	1–1	Netherlands
Kaufeldt 44'	Report	le Fèvre 77'

Stade Olympique, Colombes
Attendance: 9,915
Referee: Heinrich Retschury (AUT)
June 9, 1924

Sweden	3–1	Netherlands
Rydell 34' 77'; Lundqvist 42'	Report	Formenoy 43' (pen.)

Stade Olympique, Colombes
Attendance: 40,522
Referee: Youssuf Mohamed (EGY)

Final rank
4th place

== Modern pentathlon ==
Four pentathletes represented the Netherlands in 1924. It was the nation's second appearance in the sport.

Pentathlete	Event	Final	
Pentathlete	Event	Score	Rank
Barent Momma	Individual	130.5	31
Carolus Stoffels	Individual	102.5	22
Christiaan Tonnet	Individual	65.5	8
Karel van den Brandeler	Individual	113.5	27

== Rowing ==
17 rowers represented the Netherlands in 1924. It was the nation's fourth appearance in the sport. Dutch rowers won their first Olympic championship since 1900.

Ranks given are within the heat.

Rower	Event	Semifinals		Repechage		Final	
Rower	Event	Result	Rank	Result	Rank	Result	Rank
Constant Pieterse	Single sculls	Unknown	2 r	Unknown	3	Did not advance	
Teun Beijnen; Willy Rösingh	Coxless pair	Walkover		Advanced directly		8:19.4	1st place, gold medalist(s)
Jacob Brandsma; Jo Brandsma; Louis Dekker; Dirk Fortuin; Jean van Silfhout	Coxed four	7:08.0	1 Q	Advanced directly		Did not finish	5
Simon Bon; Jacob Cremer; Cornelis Eecen; Antony Fennema; Roelof Hommema; Paul Maasland; Henk Rijnders; Gerrit Tromp; Egbertus Waller	Eight	Unknown	3	N/A		Did not advance	

== Sailing ==
Four sailors represented the Netherlands in 1924. It was the nation's third appearance in the sport.

Sailor	Event	Qualifying				Final			
Sailor	Event	Race 1	Race 2	Race 3	Total	Race 1	Race 2	Total	Rank
Johan Hin	Olympic monotype	8 (DNF)	1 Q	N/A		8 (DQ)	2	10	5
Johan Carp; Anthonij Guépin; Jan Vreede	6 metre class	2 Q	9 (DQ)	2 Q	13	2	3	5	3rd place, bronze medalist(s)

== Shooting ==
Eleven shooters represented the Netherlands in 1924. It was the nation's fifth appearance in the sport.

Shooter	Event	Final	
Shooter	Event	Score	Rank
Jan van Balkum	25 m rapid fire pistol	13	40
Sikke Bruinsma	25 m rapid fire pistol	15	30
Hendrik de Grijff	600 m free rifle	76	45
Carel de Iongh	600 m free rifle	62	65
Albert Langereis	600 m free rifle	55	69
François Marits	25 m rapid fire pistol	16	21
Johannes Scheuter	600 m free rifle	64	63
Dingenis de Wilde	25 m rapid fire pistol	15	30
Gerrit Bouwhuis; Carel de Iongh; Adrianus van Korlaar; François Kortleven; Albert Langereis	Team free rifle	458	16

== Swimming ==
Ranks given are within the heat.

Men

Swimmer	Event	Heats		Semifinals		Final	
Swimmer	Event	Result	Rank	Result	Rank	Result	Rank
Gé Dekker	100 m freestyle	1:11.8	5	Did not advance			
Pieter Jacobszoon	100 m freestyle	1:12.2	5	Did not advance			
Sjaak Köhler	400 m freestyle	6:20.4	5	Did not advance			
Gerlacus Moes	200 m breaststroke	3:18.8	4	Did not advance			
Pieter van Senus	100 m backstroke	1:24.8	3	Did not advance			
Aart van Wilgenburg	100 m backstroke	1:24.6	3	Did not advance			
Gé Dekker; Otto Hoogesteyn; Sjaak Köhler; Frits Schutte	4 × 200 m freestyle relay	11:35.6	2 Q	11:29.0	4	Did not advance	

Women

Swimmer	Event	Heats		Semifinals		Final	
Swimmer	Event	Result	Rank	Result	Rank	Result	Rank
Mietje Baron	200 m breaststroke	—N/a		DSQ	—	Did not advance	
Truus Klapwijk	400 m freestyle	7:15.0	3	Did not advance			
Maria Vierdag	100 m freestyle	1:22.0	3 q	1:21.2	4	Did not advance	
Maria Vierdag	400 m freestyle	7:02.4	4	Did not advance			
Mietje Baron; Alida Bolten; Truus Klapwijk; Maria Vierdag	4 × 100 m freestyle relay	—N/a				5:45.8	6

== Tennis ==
Men

Athlete	Event	Round of 128	Round of 64	Round of 32	Round of 16	Quarterfinals	Semifinals	Final	
Athlete	Event	Opposition Score	Opposition Score	Opposition Score	Opposition Score	Opposition Score	Opposition Score	Opposition Score	Rank
Marius van der Feen	Singles	Bye	Sleem (IND); L 4–6, 1–6, 4–6	Did not advance					
Gerard Leembruggen	Singles	Bye	Gilbert (GBR); L 1–6, 10–12, 1–6	Did not advance					
Christiaan van Lennep	Singles	Bye	Cattaruzza (ARG); W 6–3, 6–1, 6–1	Washburn (USA); L 6–2, 1–6, 1–6, 2–6	Did not advance				
Hendrik Timmer	Singles	Bye	Ulrich (DEN); W 6–3, 2–6, 1–6, 6–2, 6–3	Fukuda (JPN); L 6–8, 4–6, 7–5, 4–6	Did not advance				
Christiaan van Lennep; Hendrik Timmer	Doubles	—N/a	Honda / Fukuda (JPN); L 4–6, 6–1, 3–6, 6–1, 2–6	Did not advance					
Marius van der Feen; Gerard Leembruggen	Doubles	—N/a	Žemla / Koželuh (TCH); L 3–6, 2–6, 3–6	Did not advance					

Women

Athlete	Event	Round of 64	Round of 32	Round of 16	Quarterfinals	Semifinals	Final	
Athlete	Event	Opposition Score	Opposition Score	Opposition Score	Opposition Score	Opposition Score	Opposition Score	Rank
Cornelia Bouman	Singles	Bye	Dupont (BEL); W 8–6, 6–4	Mallory (NOR); L 7–9, 0–6	Did not advance			

Mixed

Athlete	Event	Round of 32	Round of 16	Quarterfinals	Semifinals	Final	
Athlete	Event	Opposition Score	Opposition Score	Opposition Score	Opposition Score	Opposition Score	Rank
Cornelia Bouman; Hendrik Timmer	Doubles	von Essen / Wennergren (SWE); W 6–4, 6–4	Várady-Péter / von Kelemen (HUN); W 6–4, 6–2	Covell / Godfree (GBR); W 6–1, 7–5	Jessup / Richards (USA); L 3–6, 0–6	Bronze medal final McKane / Gilbert (GBR); W Retired	3rd place, bronze medalist(s)

== Water polo ==
The Netherlands made its third Olympic water polo appearance.

Roster

- Gé Bohlander
- Willy Bohlander
- Willem Bokhoven
- Jan den Boer
- A. Goedings
- Sjaak Köhler
- Abraham van Olst
- Karel Struijs
- Han van Senus
- Pieter van Senus
- R. van Senus

First round

Netherlands	7–0	Switzerland	Piscine des Tourelles

Quarterfinals

France	6–3	Netherlands	Piscine des Tourelles

Silver medal semifinals

United States	4–2	Netherlands	Piscine des Tourelles

Bronze medal semifinals

United States	4–2	Netherlands	Piscine des Tourelles

== Weightlifting ==
Athlete	Event	1H Snatch	1H Clean & Jerk	Press	Snatch	Clean & Jerk	Total	Rank
Ab Oord	Men's +82.5 kg						447.5	14
Guus Scheffer	Men's -67.5 kg	62.5	80	80	82.5	110	415	7
Jan Verheijen	Men's -82.5 kg	72.5	77.5	87.5	90	120	447.5	12

== Wrestling ==
=== Greco-Roman ===
Men's

Athlete	Event	First round	Second round	Third round	Fourth round	Fifth round	Sixth round	Seventh round	Eighth round	Rank
Athlete	Event	Opposition Result	Opposition Result	Opposition Result	Opposition Result	Opposition Result	Opposition Result	Opposition Result	Opposition Result	Rank
Carl Coerse	Lightweight	Solé (ESP); W	Frisenfeldt (DEN); L	Kratochvíl (TCH); L	Did not advance			—N/a		=13
Wilhelmus Doll	Middleweight	Vilciņš (LAT); L	Nilsson (SWE); L	Did not advance					—N/a	=20
Johannes van Maaren	Bantamweight	Krievs (LAT); W	Zervinis (GRE); W	Tasnádi (HUN); L	Magyar (HUN); L	Did not advance		—N/a		=9
Antonie Misset	Light heavyweight	Baumert (FRA); W	Nađ (YUG); W	Pellinen (FIN); L	Moustafa (EGY); L	Did not advance			—N/a	=6
Jan Muijs	Light heavyweight	Nielsen (DEN); L	Varga (HUN); L	Did not advance					—N/a	=12
Jan Reinderman	Middleweight	Domas (FRA); W	Sade (TUR); W	Westerlund (FIN); L	Christoffersen (DEN); L	Did not advance			—N/a	=9
Jan Sint	Heavyweight	Donati (ITA); W	Hansen (DEN); L	Rosenqvist (FIN); L	Did not advance			—N/a		=9
Jaap Sjouwerman	Heavyweight	Pothier (BEL); L	Szelky (HUN); L	Did not advance				—N/a		=13
