= Hungary at the 1924 Summer Olympics =

- IOC code: HUN
- NOC: Hungarian Olympic Committee

in Paris
- Competitors: 89 in 12 sports
- Flag bearer: Sándor Toldi
- Medals Ranked 13th: Gold 2 Silver 3 Bronze 4 Total 9

Summer Olympics appearances (overview)
- 1896; 1900; 1904; 1908; 1912; 1920; 1924; 1928; 1932; 1936; 1948; 1952; 1956; 1960; 1964; 1968; 1972; 1976; 1980; 1984; 1988; 1992; 1996; 2000; 2004; 2008; 2012; 2016; 2020; 2024

Other related appearances
- 1906 Intercalated Games

Hungary competed at the 1924 Summer Olympics in Paris, France, returning to the Olympic Games after not being invited to the 1920 Games because of the nation's role in World War I. 89 competitors, 86 men and 3 women, took part in 54 events in 12 sports.

== Medalists ==
The following Hungarian competitors won medals at the games. In the discipline sections below, the medalists' names are bolded.

Medal	Name	Sport	Event	Date
Gold	Gyula Halasy	Shooting	Men's trap	9 July
Gold	Sándor Pósta	Fencing	Men's sabre	18 July
Silver	Elemér Somfay	Athletics	Men's pentathlon	7 July
Silver	Lajos Keresztes	Wrestling	Men's Greco-Roman lightweight	10 July
Silver	László Berti; János Garay; Sándor Pósta; József Rády; Zoltán Ozoray Schenker; László Széchy; Ödön Tersztyánszky; Jenő Uhlyárik	Fencing	Men's team sabre	15 July
Bronze	László Berti; István Lichteneckert; Sándor Pósta; Zoltán Ozoray Schenker; Ödön Tersztyánszky	Fencing	Men's team foil	30 June
Bronze	Rajmund Badó	Wrestling	Men's Greco-Roman heavyweight	10 July
Bronze	János Garay	Fencing	Men's sabre	18 July
Bronze	Károly Bartha	Swimming	Men's 100 metre backstroke	18 July

Default sort order: Medal, Date, Name

Medals by sport
**Sport**	1st place, gold medalist(s)	2nd place, silver medalist(s)	3rd place, bronze medalist(s)	Total
Fencing	1	1	2	4
Shooting	1	0	0	1
Wrestling	0	1	1	2
Athletics	0	1	0	1
Swimming	0	0	1	1
Total	2	3	4	9

=== Multiple medalists ===
The following competitors won multiple medals at the 1924 Olympic Games.

Name	Medal	Sport	Event
Sándor Pósta	Gold; Silver; Bronze	Fencing	Men's sabre Men's team sabre Men's team foil
János Garay	Silver; Bronze	Fencing	Men's team sabre Men's sabre
László Berti	Silver; Bronze	Fencing	Men's team sabre Men's team foil
Zoltán Ozoray Schenker	Silver; Bronze	Fencing	Men's team sabre Men's team foil
Ödön Tersztyánszky	Silver; Bronze	Fencing	Men's team sabre Men's team foil

== Aquatics ==
=== Swimming ===
Ranks given are within the heat.

Men

Swimmer	Event	Heats		Semifinals		Final	
Swimmer	Event	Result	Rank	Result	Rank	Result	Rank
István Bárány	100 m freestyle	1:08.4	2 Q	1:08.0	6	did not advance	
Károly Bartha	100 m backstroke	1:18.0	1 Q	1:19.0	3 q	1:17.8	3rd place, bronze medalist(s)
Frigyes Hollósi	200 m breaststroke	3:06.4	2 Q	3:05.6	4	did not advance	
Zoltán Bitskey	200 m breaststroke	3:05.4	3 q	3:09.2	5	did not advance	
Márton Sipos	200 m breaststroke	3:09.8	3	did not advance			

Women

Swimmer	Event	Heats		Semifinals		Final	
Swimmer	Event	Result	Rank	Result	Rank	Result	Rank
Ella Molnár	200 m breaststroke	—N/a		3:39.8	4	did not advance	

=== Water polo ===
Hungary made its second Olympic water polo appearance.

Roster

- István Barta
- Tibor Fazekas
- Lajos Homonnai
- Márton Homonnai
- A. Ivády
- F. Kann
- Alajos Keserű
- Ferenc Keserű
- B. Nagy
- József Vértesy
- János Wenk

First round

Hungary	7–6	Great Britain	Piscine des Tourelles

Quarterfinals

Belgium	3–2	Hungary	Piscine des Tourelles

Bronze medal quarterfinals

Hungary	7–0	Czechoslovakia	Piscine des Tourelles

Bronze medal semifinals

Hungary	1–4	Sweden	Piscine des Tourelles

== Athletics ==
Sixteen athletes represented Hungary in 1924. It was the nation's sixth appearance in the sport as well as the Games. Somfay took Hungary's only athletics medal in Paris, with the silver in the pentathlon.

Ranks given are within the heat.

Athlete	Event	Heats		Quarterfinals		Semifinals		Final	
Athlete	Event	Result	Rank	Result	Rank	Result	Rank	Result	Rank
Pál Bedő	Shot put	N/A				12.66	4	did not advance	
Lajos Csejthey	Javelin throw	N/A				54.86	5	did not advance	
Mihály Fekete	10 km walk	N/A				Disqualified		did not advance	
Jenő Gáspár	High jump	N/A				1.83	1 Q	1.88	5
Ferenc Gerő	100 m	11.0	1 Q	Unknown	3	did not advance			
Ferenc Gerő	200 m	Unknown	2 Q	22.4	4	did not advance			
István Grósz	1500 m	N/A				Unknown	5	did not advance	
Pál Király	10000 m	N/A						did not finish	
Pál Király	Marathon	N/A						did not finish	
István Kultsár	5000 m	N/A				Unknown	8	did not advance	
Lajos Kurunczy	100 m	11.4	1 Q	11.0	5	did not advance			
Lajos Kurunczy	200 m	22.6	1 Q	Unknown	3	did not advance			
Lajos Kurunczy	400 m	52.6	2 Q	did not start		did not advance			
Antal Lovas	Marathon	N/A						3:35:24.0	28
Kálmán Marvalits	Discus throw	N/A				40.82	4	did not advance	
László Muskát	100 m	Unknown	5	did not advance					
László Muskát	110 m hurdles	N/A		Unknown	4	did not advance			
Tibor Püspöki	110 m hurdles	N/A		Unknown	4	did not advance			
Gusztáv Rózsahegyi	100 m	11.3	2 Q	Unknown	5	did not advance			
Elemér Somfay	Pentathlon	N/A						16	2nd place, silver medalist(s)
Elemér Somfay	Decathlon	N/A						did not finish	
Sándor Toldi	Discus throw	N/A				41.09	3	did not advance	
Ferenc Gerő; Lajos Kurunczy; László Muskát; Gusztáv Rózsahegyi	4 × 100 m relay	N/A		42.6	2 Q	42.4	2 Q	43.0	4

== Boxing ==
A single boxer represented Hungary at the 1924 Games. It was the nation's debut in the sport. Lőwig lost his only bout.

Boxer	Weight class	Round of 32	Round of 16	Quarterfinals	Semifinals	Final / Bronze match	
Boxer	Weight class	Opposition Score	Opposition Score	Opposition Score	Opposition Score	Opposition Score	Rank
Béla Lőwig	Lightweight	Genon (BEL); L	did not advance				17

Opponent nation	Wins	Losses	Percent
Belgium	0	1	.000
Total	0	1	.000

Round	Wins	Losses	Percent
Round of 32	0	1	.000
Round of 16	0	0	–
Quarterfinals	0	0	–
Semifinals	0	0	–
Final	0	0	–
Bronze match	0	0	–
Total	0	1	.000

== Cycling ==
Four cyclists represented Hungary in 1924. It was the nation's second appearance in the sport.

=== Road cycling ===
Ranks given are within the heat.

Cyclist	Event	Final	
Cyclist	Event	Result	Rank
Mihály Rusovszky	Time trial	7:57:49.0	51
Ferenc Steiner	Time trial	8:42:14.4	24

=== Track cycling ===
Ranks given are within the heat.

Cyclist	Event	First round		First repechage		Quarterfinals		Second repechage		Semifinals		Final	
Cyclist	Event	Result	Rank	Result	Rank	Result	Rank	Result	Rank	Result	Rank	Result	Rank
János Grimm	Sprint	Unknown	2 r	Unknown	1 Q	Unknown	3 r	Unknown	3	did not advance			
Ferenc Uhereczky	Sprint	Unknown	3 r	Unknown	2	did not advance							
János Grimm; Ferenc Uhereczky	Tandem	N/A								Unknown	2	did not advance	

== Fencing ==
Ten fencers, nine men and one woman, represented Hungary in 1924. It was the nation's fourth appearance in the sport; Hungary was one of nine nations to have women compete in the first Olympic fencing event for women.

The team competitions resulted in two medals for Hungary. In somewhat of a disappointment for Hungary, the sabre team failed to win the gold medal; it was the first time a Hungarian sabre team competed but did not win. The finals match against Italy proved decisive, as both Hungary and Italy beat the other two teams in the final. Hungary and Italy split the individual bouts in their match, with eight apiece. The tie-breaker for the match, and thus the gold medal, was number of touches between Hungary and Italy; Italy won 50 to 46. The foil team earned the country's first non-sabre fencing medal, winning the bronze.

The Hungarian men had success in the individual sabre competition, with three of the four Hungarians reaching the final. Pósta and Garai were both in the three-way tie-breaker for medal placement, finishing first and third respectively. Schenker finished fourth, and was also the only Hungarian man to compete individually in another weapon; he was eliminated in the first round of the foil.

Tary, representing Hungary in the women's foil competition, reached the final and placed sixth overall.

Men

Ranks given are within the pool.

Fencer	Event	Round 1		Round 2		Quarterfinals		Semifinals		Final	
Fencer	Event	Result	Rank	Result	Rank	Result	Rank	Result	Rank	Result	Rank
János Garai	Sabre	N/A				3–2	3 Q	6–2	3 Q	5–2	3rd place, bronze medalist(s)
Sándor Pósta	Sabre	N/A				4–2	2 Q	6–2	2 Q	5–2	1st place, gold medalist(s)
Zoltán Schenker	Foil	1–3	4	did not advance							
Zoltán Schenker	Sabre	N/A				3–3	4 Q	6–2	3 Q	4–3	4
Ödön von Tersztyánszky	Sabre	N/A				6–1	2 Q	4–4	5	did not advance	
László Berti; István Lichteneckert; Sandor Posta; Zoltan Schenker; Ödön Tersztyanszky	Team foil	1–0	2 Q	N/A		2–1	2 Q	1–1	2 Q	0–2	3rd place, bronze medalist(s)
László Berti; Janos Garay; Sandor Posta; József Rády; Zoltan Schenker; László Széchy; Ödön Tersztyanszky; Jenő Uhlyárik	Team sabre	1–0	1 Q	N/A		2–0	1 Q	1–0	1 Q	2–1	2nd place, silver medalist(s)

Women

Ranks given are within the pool.

Fencer	Event	Quarterfinals		Semifinals		Final	
Fencer	Event	Result	Rank	Result	Rank	Result	Rank
Gizella Tary	Foil	3–2	3 Q	3–2	3 Q	0–5	6

== Football ==
Hungary competed in the Olympic football tournament for the second time in 1924, losing their second-round match to Egypt.

Round 1

26 May 1924

Hungary	5–0	Poland
Eisenhoffer 14'; Hirzer 51' 58'; Opata 70' 87'	Report

Stade Bergeyre
Attendance: 3,000
Referee: Johannes Mutters (NED)

Round 2

29 May 1924

Egypt	3–0	Hungary
Yakan 4' 58'; Hegazi 40'	Report

Stade de Paris
Attendance: 8,000
Referee: Luis Collina (ESP)

Final rank
9th place

== Rowing ==
Seven rowers represented Hungary in 1924. It was the nation's third appearance in the sport.

Ranks given are within the heat.

Rower	Event	Semifinals		Repechage		Final	
Rower	Event	Result	Rank	Result	Rank	Result	Rank
Ervin Mórich; Béla Szendey	Double sculls	Unknown	3	N/A		did not advance	
Sándor Hautzinger; Károly Koch; István Szendeffy; Zoltán Török; Lajos Wick	Coxed four	Unknown	2 r	Unknown	3	did not advance	

== Shooting ==
Seven sport shooters represented Hungary in 1924. It was the nation's third appearance in the sport. Halasy took the nation's only shooting medal in 1924, a gold in the trap.

Shooter	Event	Final	
Shooter	Event	Score	Rank
Gyula Halasy	Trap	98	1st place, gold medalist(s)
Sándor Lumniczer	100 m deer, single shots	20	31
Sándor Lumniczer	Trap	Unknown	31–44
Sándor Prokopp	25 m rapid fire pistol	7	53
Sándor Prokopp	600 m free rifle	70	55
Gusztáv Szomjas	100 m deer, single shots	24	28
Gusztáv Szomjas	100 m deer, double shots	28	29
Gusztáv Szomjas	Trap	90	19
László Szomjas	Trap	90	19
Elemér Takács	25 m rapid fire pistol	13	47
Elemér Takács	50 m rifle, prone	387	20
Elemér Takács	600 m free rifle	84	14
Elemér Takács	100 m deer, single shots	27	24
Elemér Takács	100 m deer, double shots	42	25
Elemér Takács	Team deer, double shots	27	7
Rezső Velez	25 m rapid fire pistol	15	30
Rezső Velez	50 m rifle, prone	372	47
Rezső Velez	600 m free rifle	79	35
Rezső Velez	100 m deer, single shots	35	10
Rezső Velez	100 m deer, double shots	did not finish	
Sándor Prokopp; Elemér Takács; Rezső Velez	Team free rifle	276	18
Gyula Halasy; Sándor Lumniczer; Gusztáv Szomjas; László Szomjas	Team clay pigeons	321	10
Gusztáv Szomjas; László Szomjas; Elemér Takács; Rezső Velez	Team deer, single shots	97	6

== Tennis ==
Men

Athlete	Event	Round of 128	Round of 64	Round of 32	Round of 16	Quarterfinals	Semifinals	Final	
Athlete	Event	Opposition Score	Opposition Score	Opposition Score	Opposition Score	Opposition Score	Opposition Score	Opposition Score	Rank
Lajos Göncz	Singles	Bye	Lacoste (FRA); W 6–0, 6–0, 6–1	did not advance					
Béla von Kehrling	Singles	Bye	Roman (ROU); W 6–1,6–1, 6–2	Aeschlimann (SUI); W 4–6, 6–8, 7–5, 6–2, 6–3	Williams (USA); L 4–6, 6–3, 3–6, 6–4, 3–6	did not advance			
Aurél von Kelemen	Singles	Tegner (DEN); W 6–4, 6–1, 4–1	did not advance						
Kálmán Kirchmayr	Singles	Wennergren (SWE); L 6–8, 2–6, 4–6	did not advance						
Lajos Göncz; Kálmán Kirchmayr	Doubles	—N/a	Williams / Washburn (USA); L 1–6, 0–6, 0–6	did not advance					
Béla von Kehrling; Aurél von Kelemen	Doubles	—N/a	Willard / Bayley (AUS); L 8–6, 9–11, 6–3, 3–6, 2–6	did not advance					

Women

Athlete	Event	Round of 64	Round of 32	Round of 16	Quarterfinals	Semifinals	Final	
Athlete	Event	Opposition Score	Opposition Score	Opposition Score	Opposition Score	Opposition Score	Opposition Score	Rank
Ilona Várady-Péter	Singles	Janssen (BEL); W 6–4, 6–1	Covell (GBR); L 1–6, 3–6	did not advance				

Mixed

Athlete	Event	Round of 32	Round of 16	Quarterfinals	Semifinals	Final	
Athlete	Event	Opposition Score	Opposition Score	Opposition Score	Opposition Score	Opposition Score	Rank
Aurél von Kelemen; Ilona Várady-Péter	Doubles	Bye	Bouman / Timmer (NED); L 4–6, 2–6	did not advance			

== Wrestling ==
=== Greco-Roman ===
Men's

Athlete	Event	First round	Second round	Third round	Fourth round	Fifth round	Sixth round	Seventh round	Eighth round	Rank
Athlete	Event	Opposition Result	Opposition Result	Opposition Result	Opposition Result	Opposition Result	Opposition Result	Opposition Result	Opposition Result	Rank
Rajmund Badó	Heavyweight	Bye	Larsen (DEN); W	Dame (FRA); W	Polis (LAT); W	Deglane (FRA); L	Did not advance	—N/a		3rd place, bronze medalist(s)
István Dömény	Light heavyweight	Bonnefont (FRA); W	Pellinen (FIN); L	Loo (EST); L	did not advance				—N/a	=9
Ferenc Györgyei	Middleweight	Steinberg (EST); L	Domas (FRA); L	did not advance					—N/a	=20
Lajos Keresztes	Lightweight	Rahmy (EGY); W	de Marchi (ITA); W	Westerlund (FIN); W	Ronis (LAT); W	Frisenfeldt (DEN); W	Friman (FIN); L	—N/a		2nd place, silver medalist(s)
Sándor Kónyi	Middleweight	Pštros (TCH); W	Jahren (NOR); W	Fischer (AUT); L	Gorletti (ITA); L	did not advance			—N/a	=9
Armand Magyar	Bantamweight	Östman (SWE); W	Krievs (LAT); W	Hansson (SWE); L	van Maaren (NED); W	Pütsep (EST); L	Did not advance	—N/a		=5
Mihály Matura	Lightweight	Sesta (AUT); W	Parisel (FRA); W	Borgström (SWE); W	Kusnets (EST); L	Friman (FIN); L	Did not advance	—N/a		=5
Jenő Németh	Featherweight	Svensson (SWE); L	Käpp (EST); L	did not advance						=18
Ödön Radvány	Featherweight	Nord (NOR); L	Egeberg (NOR); W	Rottiers (BEL); W	Väli (EST); W	Malmberg (SWE); L	did not advance			=6
Ottó Szelky	Heavyweight	Johansson (SWE); L	Sjouwerman (NED); W	Deglane (FRA); L	did not advance			—N/a		=9
József Tasnádi	Bantamweight	Bye	Östman (SWE); W	van Maaren (NED); W	Hansson (SWE); L	Ahlfors (FIN); L	Did not advance	—N/a		=5
Béla Varga	Light heavyweight	Ceccatelli (ITA); W	Muijs (NED); W	Wecksten (FIN); L	Westergren (SWE); L	did not advance			—N/a	=6
