= Czechoslovakia at the 1924 Summer Olympics =

- IOC code: TCH
- NOC: Czechoslovak Olympic Committee

in Paris
- Competitors: 133 (129 men and 4 women) in 16 sports
- Medals Ranked 15th: Gold 1 Silver 4 Bronze 5 Total 10

Summer Olympics appearances (overview)
- 1920; 1924; 1928; 1932; 1936; 1948; 1952; 1956; 1960; 1964; 1968; 1972; 1976; 1980; 1984; 1988; 1992

Other related appearances
- Bohemia (1900–1912); Czech Republic (1994–pres.); Slovakia (1994–pres.)

Czechoslovakia competed at the 1924 Summer Olympics in Paris, France. 133 competitors, 129 men and 4 women, took part in 75 events in 16 sports.

== Medalists ==
Medal	Name	Sport	Event	Date
Gold	Bedřich Šupčík	Gymnastics	Men's rope climbing	July 20
Silver	Robert Pražák	Gymnastics	Men's artistic individual all-around	July 23
Silver	Robert Pražák	Gymnastics	Men's parallel bars	July 18
Silver	Robert Pražák	Gymnastics	Men's rings	July 19
Silver	Jan Koutný	Gymnastics	Men's vault	July 21
Bronze	Bedřich Šupčík	Gymnastics	Men's artistic individual all-around	July 23
Bronze	Ladislav Vácha	Gymnastics	Men's rings	July 19
Bronze	Ladislav Vácha	Gymnastics	Men's rope climbing	July 20
Bronze	Bohumil Mořkovský	Gymnastics	Men's vault	July 21
Bronze	Bohumil Durdis	Weightlifting	Men's 67.5 kg	July 22

== Aquatics ==
=== Diving ===
Two divers represented Czechoslovakia in 1924. It was the nation's debut in the sport.

Ranks given are within the heat.

Diver	Event	Semifinals			Final		
Diver	Event	Points	Score	Rank	Points	Score	Rank
Julius Balasz	Men's 3 m board	16	488	3 Q	44	463.1	9
Aloisie Krongeigerová	Women's 3 m board	42	233.2	9	did not advance		

=== Swimming ===
Nine swimmers, six men and three women, represented Czechoslovakia in 1924. It was the nation's 2nd appearance in the sport and the 1st time sending female swimmers.

Ranks given are within the heat.

Swimmer	Event	Heats		Semifinals		Final	
Swimmer	Event	Result	Rank	Result	Rank	Result	Rank
Julius Balasz	Men's 100 m freestyle	1:11.8	3	did not advance			
Stanislav Bičák	Men's 100 m freestyle	1:10.2	6	did not advance			
Viktor Legát	Men's 100 m freestyle	1:13.2	3	did not advance			
Václav Antoš	Men's 400 m freestyle	5:34.8	2 Q	5:53.2	5	did not advance	
Stanislav Bičák	Men's 400 m freestyle	5:52.4	5	did not advance			
Eva Chaloupková	Women's 400 m freestyle	8:14.0	5	did not advance			
Václav Antoš	Men's 1500 m freestyle	24:44.0	4	did not advance			
Viktor Legát	Men's 100 m backstroke	1:27.8	4	did not advance			
Jarmila Müllerová	Women's 100 m backstroke	—N/a		1:37.0	2 Q	1:31.2	5
Jaroslav Müller	Men's 200 m breaststroke	3:22.0	5	did not advance			
Rudolf Piowatý	Men's 200 m breaststroke	3:10.8	2 Q	3:11.8	6	did not advance	
Běla Drážková	Women's 200 m breaststroke	—N/a		3:43.0	4	did not advance	
Václav Antoš	Men's 4 × 200 m freestyle relay	11:12.8	3 q	DNS	—	did not advance	
Stanislav Bičák	Men's 4 × 200 m freestyle relay	11:12.8	3 q	DNS	—	did not advance	
Viktor Légat	Men's 4 × 200 m freestyle relay	11:12.8	3 q	DNS	—	did not advance	
Rudolf Piowatý	Men's 4 × 200 m freestyle relay	11:12.8	3 q	DNS	—	did not advance	

=== Water polo ===
Czechoslovakia made its second Olympic water polo appearance.

Roster

- Václav Ankrt
- František Cerník
- Frantšek Franěk
- Jan Hora
- J. Humelhans
- Hugo Klempfner
- František Kůrka
- Vojtech Neményi
- Jiří Reitman
- Josef Tomášek
- Frantšek Vacín

First round

Czechoslovakia	6–1	Greece	Piscine des Tourelles

Quarterfinals

Czechoslovakia	4–2	Ireland	Piscine des Tourelles

Semifinals

Belgium	5–1	Czechoslovakia	Piscine des Tourelles

Bronze medal quarterfinals

Hungary	7–0	Czechoslovakia	Piscine des Tourelles

== Athletics ==
Eighteen athletes represented Czechoslovakia in 1924. It was the nation's second appearance in the sport as well as the Games.

Ranks given are within the heat.

Athlete	Event	Heats		Quarterfinals		Semifinals		Final	
Athlete	Event	Result	Rank	Result	Rank	Result	Rank	Result	Rank
Josef Eberle	Marathon	N/A						did not finish	
František Fuhrherr-Nový	Pole vault	N/A				3.20	7	did not advance	
Bohumil Honzátko	Marathon	N/A						did not finish	
František Janda-Suk	Discus throw	N/A				34.08	10	did not advance	
Otakar Jandera	110 m hurdles	N/A		16.0	2 Q	Unknown	4	did not advance	
Emil Kalous	Marathon	N/A						did not finish	
Mór Kóczán	Javelin throw	N/A				48.39	12	did not advance	
Mikuláš Kucsera	High jump	N/A				No mark	3	did not advance	
Alois Linka	100 m	11.6	5	did not advance					
Alois Linka	100 m	Unknown	4	did not advance					
Josef Macháň	Long jump	N/A				6.09	6	did not advance	
Josef Macháň	High jump	N/A				1.75	6	did not advance	
Karel Nedobitý	5000 m	N/A				Unknown	10	did not advance	
Karel Přibyl	400 m	52.8	5	did not advance					
Karel Přibyl	800 m	N/A		2:03.8	4	did not advance			
Jan Plichta	10k walk	N/A						DQ	
Eduard Riedl	800 m	N/A		2:02.5	6	did not advance			
Vilém Šindler	1500 m	N/A				4:23.6	7	did not advance	
Alois Sobotka	Long jump	N/A				6.59	5	did not advance	
Antonín Svoboda	100 m	Unknown	3	did not advance					
Antonín Svoboda	Pentathlon	N/A						Elim-3	
Jiří Svoboda	Javelin throw	N/A				No mark	15	did not advance	

== Cycling ==
Eight cyclists represented Czechoslovakia in 1924:

- Antonín Perič
- Karel Červenka
- Antonín Charvát
- František Kundert
- Jaroslav Brož
- Oldřich Červinka
- Miloš Knobloch
- Karel Pechan

== Equestrian ==
Eleven equestrians represented Czechoslovakia in 1924. It was the nation's debut in the sport. Thiel finished sixth in the dressage for Czechoslovakia's best result.

Equestrian	Event	Final		
Equestrian	Event	Score	Time	Rank
Oldřich Buchar	Jumping	45.00	2:37.6	34
Josef Charous	Eventing	359.5	N/A	32
František Donda	Dressage	236.0	N/A	11
Jaroslav Hanf	Dressage	213.4	N/A	19
Bedřich John	Eventing	did not finish		
Matěj Pechman	Eventing	did not finish		
Rudolf Popler	Jumping	24.50	2:45.8	23
Josef Rabas	Jumping	did not finish		
Otto Schöniger	Dressage	215.0	N/A	18
František Statečný	Eventing	did not finish		
Emanuel Thiel	Dressage	256.2	N/A	6
Oldřich Buchar; Rudolf Popler; Josef Rabas	Team jumping	did not finish		
Josef Charous; Bedřich John; Matěj Pechman; František Statečný	Team eventing	did not finish		

== Fencing ==
Seven fencers, all men, represented Czechoslovakia in 1924. It was the nation's second appearance in the sport as well as the Games. The sabre team advanced to the final for the second consecutive Games (this time placing it in the top four), and for the second time finished without a win in the final pool.

Men

Ranks given are within the pool.

Fencer	Event	Round 1		Round 2		Quarterfinals		Semifinals		Final	
Fencer	Event	Result	Rank	Result	Rank	Result	Rank	Result	Rank	Result	Rank
František Dvořák	Foil	0–4	5	did not advance							
Josef Javůrek	Épée	0–8	9	N/A		did not advance					
Josef Javůrek	Foil	0–3	4	did not advance							
Josef Jungmann	Épée	2–7	9	N/A		did not advance					
Jan Tille	Épée	2–6	8	N/A		did not advance					
Alexandr Bárta; František Dvořák; Josef Jungmann; Luděk Oppl; Otakar Švorčík	Team sabre	1–1	2 Q	N/A		1–1	2 Q	1–0	2 Q	0–3	4

== Football ==
Czechoslovakia competed in the Olympic football tournament for the second time in 1924.

Round 1

May 25, 1924

Czechoslovakia	5–2	Turkey
Sloup 21'; Sedláček 28' 37'; Novák 64'; Čapek 74'	Report	Refet 63' 82'

Stade Bergeyre
Attendance: 5,000
Referee: P. Chr. Andersen (NOR)

Round 2

May 28, 1924

Switzerland	1–1 (a.e.t.)	Czechoslovakia
Dietrich 79'	Report	Sloup 21' (pen.)

Stade Bergeyre
Attendance: 12,000
Referee: P. Chr. Andersen (NOR)
May 30, 1924

Switzerland	1–0	Czechoslovakia
Pache 87'	Report

Stade Bergeyre
Attendance: 10,000
Referee: Marcel Slawik (FRA)

Final rank
9th place

== Gymnastics ==
Eight gymnasts represented Czechoslovakia in 1924. It was the nation's second appearance in the sport as well as the Games; Czechoslovakia had not won any medals in its prior appearance. Individual gymnasts had great success, taking four of the top six places (though Pražák missed out on the gold medal by .017 points) and with all six finishers placing in the top 13. Indruch and Kos, however, did not compete in each apparatus, preventing Czechoslovakia from turning in what would have been a dominant team score.

The only gold medal was that of Šupčík (the overall bronze winner) in the rope climbing. Pražák had two apparatus silvers to go with his all-around silver, while Koutný had one apparatus silver. Vácha had a pair of apparatus bronzes, and Mořkovský added one more. The total tally of nine medals was more than that won by any other nation, though three countries took a pair of gold medals each to place Czechoslovakia fourth on the leaderboard.

=== Artistic gymnastics ===
Equestrian	Event	Final	
Equestrian	Event	Score	Rank
Stanislav Indruch	All-around	did not finish	
Stanislav Indruch	Horizontal bar	17.430	19
Stanislav Indruch	Parallel bars	20.50	18
Miroslav Klinger	All-around	105.500	5
Miroslav Klinger	Horizontal bar	16.470	26
Miroslav Klinger	Parallel bars	21.13	10
Miroslav Klinger	Pommel horse	19.670	7
Miroslav Klinger	Rings	20.730	11
Miroslav Klinger	Rope climbing	8 (9.4 s)	24
Miroslav Klinger	Sidehorse vault	9.75	12
Miroslav Klinger	Vault	9.75	7
Josef Kos	All-around	did not finish	
Josef Kos	Horizontal bar	17.960	15
Josef Kos	Parallel bars	21.28	7
Jan Koutný	All-around	103.359	11
Jan Koutný	Horizontal bar	15.716	35
Jan Koutný	Parallel bars	21.00	11
Jan Koutný	Pommel horse	17.870	22
Jan Koutný	Rings	21.053	7
Jan Koutný	Rope climbing	8 (9.4 s)	24
Jan Koutný	Sidehorse vault	9.75	12
Jan Koutný	Vault	9.97	2nd place, silver medalist(s)
Bohumil Mořkovský	All-around	102.743	13
Bohumil Mořkovský	Horizontal bar	14.563	41
Bohumil Mořkovský	Parallel bars	20.93	13
Bohumil Mořkovský	Pommel horse	16.790	31
Bohumil Mořkovský	Rings	21.080	6
Bohumil Mořkovský	Rope climbing	10 (9.0 s)	18
Bohumil Mořkovský	Sidehorse vault	9.45	23
Bohumil Mořkovský	Vault	9.93	3rd place, bronze medalist(s)
Robert Pražák	All-around	110.323	2nd place, silver medalist(s)
Robert Pražák	Horizontal bar	18.730	9
Robert Pražák	Parallel bars	21.61	2nd place, silver medalist(s)
Robert Pražák	Pommel horse	18.970	13
Robert Pražák	Rings	21.483	2nd place, silver medalist(s)
Robert Pražák	Rope climbing	10 (8.8 s)	13
Robert Pražák	Sidehorse vault	9.80	8
Robert Pražák	Vault	9.74	9
Bedřich Šupčík	All-around	106.930	3rd place, bronze medalist(s)
Bedřich Šupčík	Horizontal bar	17.860	16
Bedřich Šupčík	Parallel bars	21.26	8
Bedřich Šupčík	Pommel horse	17.530	24
Bedřich Šupčík	Rings	21.120	5
Bedřich Šupčík	Rope climbing	10 (7.2 s)	1st place, gold medalist(s)
Bedřich Šupčík	Sidehorse vault	9.83	6
Bedřich Šupčík	Vault	9.33	15
Ladislav Vácha	All-around	105.300	6
Ladislav Vácha	Horizontal bar	14.700	39
Ladislav Vácha	Parallel bars	21.31	6
Ladislav Vácha	Pommel horse	18.330	17
Ladislav Vácha	Rings	21.430	3rd place, bronze medalist(s)
Ladislav Vácha	Rope climbing	10 (7.8 s)	3rd place, bronze medalist(s)
Ladislav Vácha	Sidehorse vault	9.83	6
Ladislav Vácha	Vault	9.70	10
Stanislav Indruch; Miroslav Klinger; Josef Kos; Jan Koutný; Bohumil Mořkovský; Robert Pražák; Bedřich Šupčík; Ladislav Vácha	Team	did not finish	

== Modern pentathlon ==
Two pentathletes represented Czechoslovakia in 1924. It was the nation's debut in the sport. The Czechoslovaks took the bottom two places.

Pentathlete	Event	Final	
Pentathlete	Event	Score	Rank
Jindřich Lepiere	Individual	169.5	38
Karel Tůma	Individual	166.5	37

== Sailing ==
A single sailor represented Czechoslovakia in 1924. It was the nation's debut in the sport.

Sailor	Event	Qualifying				Final			
Sailor	Event	Race 1	Race 2	Race 3	Total	Race 1	Race 2	Total	Rank
Eduard Bürgermeister	Olympic monotype	7	6	N/A		did not advance			

== Shooting ==
Eighteen sport shooters represented Czechoslovakia in 1924. It was the nation's second appearance in the sport as well as the Games.

Shooter	Event	Final	
Shooter	Event	Score	Rank
Antonín Byczanski	50 m rifle, prone	372	47
František Čermák	600 m free rifle	66	60
Miloslav Hlaváč	100 m deer, single shots	32	17
Miloslav Hlaváč	100 m deer, double shots	55	19
Miloslav Hlaváč	100 m team deer, single shots	33	7
Josef Hosa	100 m deer, single shots	21	30
Josef Hosa	100 m deer, double shots	41	27
Rudolf Jelen	50 m rifle, prone	381	36
Rudolf Jelen	600 m free rifle	75	46
Rudolf Jelen	100 m deer, single shots	24	28
Rudolf Jelen	100 m deer, double shots	57	15
Josef Kruz	25 m rapid fire pistol	7	53
Jaroslav Mach	25 m rapid fire pistol	13	47
Jaroslav Mach	600 m free rifle	79	35
Josef Pavlík	25 m rapid fire pistol	13	40
Kurt Riedl	Trap	Unknown	31–44
František Schuster	Trap	Unknown	31–44
Antonín Siegl	Trap	Unknown	31–44
Josef Sucharda	50 m rifle, prone	376	41
Josef Sucharda	600 m free rifle	79	35
Josef Sucharda	100 m deer, single shots	20	31
Josef Sucharda	100 m deer, double shots	53	20
Emil Werner	25 m rapid fire pistol	14	37
Emil Werner	50 m rifle, prone	369	52
Miloslav Hlaváč; Josef Hosa; Rudolf Jelen; Josef Suchada	100 m team deer, double shots	204	6
Antonín Byczanski; František Čermák; Josef Kozlík; Jaroslav Mach; Josef Sucharda	Team free rifle	501	14
Bruno Frank; Antonín Jílek; Richard Klier; Pavel Mach; Kurt Riedl; Antonín Siegl	Team clay pigeons	309	12

== Tennis ==
Men

Athlete	Event	Round of 128	Round of 64	Round of 32	Round of 16	Quarterfinals	Semifinals	Final	
Athlete	Event	Opposition Score	Opposition Score	Opposition Score	Opposition Score	Opposition Score	Opposition Score	Opposition Score	Rank
Jan Koželuh	Singles	Bye	Okamoto (JPN); W 4–6, 7–5, 10–8, 4–6, 6–4	Lacoste (FRA); L 1–6, 2–6, 1–6	did not advance				
Pavel Macenauer	Singles	Bye	Lammens (BEL); W 6–0, 6–1, 6–0	Williams (USA); L 2–6, 6–4, 6–3, 2–6, 1–6	did not advance				
Friedrich Rohrer	Singles	Kingscote (GBR); L 3–6, 4–6, 6–4, 6–3, 3–6	did not advance						
Ladislav Žemla	Singles	Bye	Harada (JPN); L 3–6, 6–3, 2–6, 2–6	did not advance					
Ernst Gottlieb; Friedrich Rohrer	Doubles	—N/a	Godfree / Woosnam (GBR); W 6–3, 6–4, 6–2	Williams / Washburn (USA); L 3–6, 2–6, 1–6	did not advance				
Jan Koželuh; Ladislav Žemla	Doubles	—N/a	van der Feen / Leembruggen (NED); W 6–3, 6–2, 6–3	Aeschlimann / Ferrier (SUI); W 6–4, 3–6, 6–4, 6–4	Richards / Hunter (USA); L 2–6, 3–6, 4–6	did not advance			

== Weightlifting ==
Athlete	Event	1H Snatch	1H Clean & Jerk	Press	Snatch	Clean & Jerk	Total	Rank
Bohumil Durdis	Men's −67.5 kg	70	82.5	72.5	90	110	425	3rd place, bronze medalist(s)
František Fišer	Men's +82.5 kg						435	16
Antonín Hrabě	Men's −60 kg	57.5	80	62.5	70	95	365	9
Jaroslav Skobla	Men's −82.5 kg	70	95	92.5	85	127.5	470	8
Bohumil Stinný	Men's −82.5 kg	70	X	X	–	–	DNF	–
Josef Tomáš	Men's −75 kg	60	72.5	80	70	110	392.5	15

== Wrestling ==
=== Greco-Roman ===
Men's

Athlete	Event	First round	Second round	Third round	Fourth round	Fifth round	Sixth round	Seventh round	Eighth round	Rank
Athlete	Event	Opposition Result	Opposition Result	Opposition Result	Opposition Result	Opposition Result	Opposition Result	Opposition Result	Opposition Result	Rank
Josef Beránek	Lightweight	Bergmann (AUT); W	Friman (FIN); L	Gaupset (NOR); L	did not advance			—N/a		=13
Jan Bozděch	Bantamweight	Gundersen (DEN); L	Ponte (ITA); W	Herschmann (AUT); L	did not advance			—N/a		=13
František Dyršmid	Featherweight	Quaqlia (ITA); W	Anttila (FIN); L	Toivola (FIN); L	did not advance					=13
František Kratochvíl	Lightweight	de Marchi (ITA); W	Rahmy (EGY); W	Coerse (NED); W	Frisenfeldt (DEN); W	Westerlund (FIN); L	Retired; L	—N/a		=5
František Pražský	Middleweight	Bye	Gorletti (ITA); L	Steinberg (EST); L	did not advance				—N/a	=15
Oldřich Pštros	Middleweight	Kónyi (HUN); L	Grandjean (SUI); W	Clody (FRA); W	Fischer (AUT); L	did not advance			—N/a	=9
František Řezáč	Featherweight	Fettes (LUX); W	Nord (NOR); L	Egeberg (NOR); L	did not advance					=13
Antonín Skopový	Bantamweight	Kueny (FRA); L	Olsen (NOR); W	Pütsep (EST); L	did not advance			—N/a		=13
František Tázler	Light heavyweight	Tetens (DEN); W	Westergren (SWE); L	Retired; L	did not advance				—N/a	=12
