= Denmark at the 1924 Summer Olympics =

- IOC code: DEN
- NOC: Danish Olympic Committee

in Paris
- Competitors: 89 (78 men and 11 women) in 13 sports
- Flag bearer: Peter Ryefelt
- Medals Ranked 12th: Gold 2 Silver 5 Bronze 2 Total 9

Summer Olympics appearances (overview)
- 1896; 1900; 1904; 1908; 1912; 1920; 1924; 1928; 1932; 1936; 1948; 1952; 1956; 1960; 1964; 1968; 1972; 1976; 1980; 1984; 1988; 1992; 1996; 2000; 2004; 2008; 2012; 2016; 2020; 2024

Other related appearances
- 1906 Intercalated Games

Denmark competed at the 1924 Summer Olympics in Paris, France. 89 competitors, 78 men and 11 women, took part in 60 events in 13 sports.

== Medalists ==
Medal	Name	Sport	Event	Date
Gold	Hans Jacob Nielsen	Boxing	Men's lightweight	July 20
Gold	Ellen Osiier	Fencing	Women's foil	July 4
Silver	Thyge Petersen	Boxing	Men's light heavyweight	July 20
Silver	Søren Petersen	Boxing	Men's heavyweight	July 20
Silver	Edmund Hansen, Willy Hansen	Cycling	Men's tandem	July 27
Silver	Frode Kirkebjerg	Equestrian	Individual eventing	July 26
Silver	Knud Degn, Christian Nielsen, Vilhelm Vett	Sailing	6 m Class	July 26
Bronze	Grete Heckscher	Fencing	Women's foil	July 4
Bronze	Niels Larsen	Shooting	Men's 600 m free rifle	June 27

== Athletics ==
Nine athletes represented Denmark in 1924. It was the nation's sixth appearance in the sport as well as the Games. Petersen's fourth-place finish in the pole vault was the best result for the Danish athletes in Paris.

Ranks given are within the heat.

Athlete	Event	Heats		Quarterfinals		Semifinals		Final	
Athlete	Event	Result	Rank	Result	Rank	Result	Rank	Result	Rank
Axel Jensen	Marathon	N/A						2:58:44.8	11
Kai Jensen	400 m	50.9	2 Q	Unknown	5	did not advance			
Kai Jensen	800 m	N/A		1:58.4	1 Q	Unknown	5	did not advance	
Karl Jensen	Discus throw	N/A				39.78	5	did not advance	
Karl Jensen	Hammer throw	N/A				36.265	11	did not advance	
Albert Larsen	800 m	N/A		1:58.8	3 Q	2:00.2	8	did not advance	
Albert Larsen	1500 m	N/A				4:11.5	3	did not advance	
Louis Lundgren	110 m hurdles	N/A		Unknown	3	did not advance			
Louis Lundgren	400 m hurdles	N/A		56.0	3	did not advance			
Henry Petersen	Pole vault	N/A				3.66	1 Q	3.90	4
Poul Schiang	100 m	Unknown	4	did not advance					
Henri Thorsen	110 m hurdles	N/A		16.0	1 Q	15.7	5	did not advance	
Henri Thorsen	400 m hurdles	N/A		57.2	2 Q	57.3	6	did not advance	
Mogens Truelsen	100 m	Unknown	3	did not advance					
Mogens Truelsen	200 m	Unknown	4	did not advance					
Kaj Jensen; Poul Schiang; Henri Thorsen; Mogens Truelsen	4 × 100 m relay	N/A		44.0	2 Q	43.8	4	did not advance	

== Boxing ==
Eight boxers represented Denmark at the 1924 Games. It was the nation's third appearance in the sport. Hans Jacob Nielsen became the first Danish Olympic champion in boxing after moving up from featherweight in 1920 to lightweight in 1924. Soren Petersen repeated as the silver medalist in the top weight class, while Thyge Petersen added another silver in the light heavyweight.

Boxer	Weight class	Round of 32	Round of 16	Quarterfinals	Semifinals	Final / Bronze match	
Boxer	Weight class	Opposition Score	Opposition Score	Opposition Score	Opposition Score	Opposition Score	Rank
Robert Larsen	Heavyweight	N/A	Konarzewski (POL); W	de Best (NED); L	did not advance		5
Carl Lindberg	Light heavyweight	Bye	Saraudi (ITA); L	did not advance			9
Hans Jacob Nielsen	Lightweight	Rodríguez (CHI); W	Savignac (FRA); W	Hansen (NOR); W	Boylstein (USA); W	Copello (ARG); W	1st place, gold medalist(s)
Harald Nielsen	Welterweight	Oldani (ITA); L	did not advance				17
Andreas Petersen	Welterweight	Gneftos (GRE); W	Méndez (ARG); L	did not advance			9
Charles Petersen	Lightweight	Laurent (LUX); W	Hansen (NOR); L	did not advance			9
Soren Petersen	Heavyweight	N/A	Scotti (ITA); W	Clifton (GBR); W	de Best (NED); W	von Porat (NOR); L	2nd place, silver medalist(s)
Thyge Petersen	Light heavyweight	Rodríguez (ARG); W	Gerbich (POL); W	Mulholland (USA); W	Sørsdal (NOR); W	Mitchell (GBR); L	2nd place, silver medalist(s)

Opponent nation	Wins	Losses	Percent
Argentina	2	1	.667
Chile	1	0	1.000
France	1	0	1.000
Great Britain	1	1	.500
Greece	1	0	1.000
Italy	1	2	.333
Luxembourg	1	0	1.000
Netherlands	1	1	.500
Norway	2	2	.500
Poland	2	0	1.000
United States	2	0	1.000
Total	15	7	.682

Round	Wins	Losses	Percent
Round of 32	4	1	.800
Round of 16	4	3	.571
Quarterfinals	3	1	.750
Semifinals	3	0	1.000
Final	1	2	.333
Bronze match	0	0	–
Total	15	7	.682

== Cycling ==
Six cyclists represented Denmark in 1924. It was the nation's third appearance in the sport. The Hansens won Denmark's first Olympic cycling medal, with a silver in the tandem competition.

=== Road cycling ===
Ranks given are within the heat.

Cyclist	Event	Final	
Cyclist	Event	Result	Rank
Erik Andersen	Time trial	did not finish	
Ahrensborg Claussen	Time trial	7:19:16.4	38

=== Track cycling ===
Ranks given are within the heat.

Cyclist	Event	First round		First repechage		Quarterfinals		Second repechage		Semifinals		Final	
Cyclist	Event	Result	Rank	Result	Rank	Result	Rank	Result	Rank	Result	Rank	Result	Rank
Holger Guldager	Sprint	Unknown	2 r	Unknown	1 Q	Unknown	2 r	Unknown	1 Q	Unknown	2	did not advance	
Edmund Hansen	50 km	N/A										Unknown	8–36
Willy Hansen	50 km	N/A										did not finish	
Willy Hansen	Sprint	Unknown	2 r	Unknown	1 Q	Unknown	2 r	Unknown	3	did not advance			
Edmund Hansen; Willy Hansen	Tandem	N/A								12.8	1 Q	Unknown	2nd place, silver medalist(s)
Holger Guldager; Edmund Hansen; Willy Hansen; Jens Kjeldsen	Team pursuit	5:27.6	1 Q	N/A		did not start		N/A		did not advance			

== Diving ==
Four divers represented Denmark in 1924. It was the nation's second appearance in the sport.

Ranks given are within the heat.

Men

Diver	Event	Semifinals			Final		
Diver	Event	Points	Score	Rank	Points	Score	Rank
Herold Jansson	Plain high diving	21	141	5	did not advance		
Volmer Otzen	Plain high diving	22	137	4	did not advance		
Sven Palle Sørensen	10 m platform	16	400	3 Q	36	404.6	7
Sven Palle Sørensen	Plain high diving	38	125	7	did not advance		

Women

Diver	Event	Semifinals			Final		
Diver	Event	Points	Score	Rank	Points	Score	Rank
Edith Nielsen	10 m platform	18.5	128	3 Q	17.5	157	4

== Equestrian ==
A single equestrian represented Denmark in 1924. It was the nation's second appearance in the sport, and first since 1912. Kirkebjerg, who was on the 1912 team as well, won the silver medal in the eventing competition to earn Denmark's first Olympic equestrian medal.

Equestrian	Event	Final		
Equestrian	Event	Score	Time	Rank
Frode Kirkebjerg	Eventing	1853.5	N/A	2nd place, silver medalist(s)

== Fencing ==
Eleven fencers, seven men and four women, represented Denmark in 1924. It was the nation's sixth appearance in the sport as well as the Games; Denmark had competed in fencing more often than any other country. Denmark was one of nine countries to enter women in the first Olympic women's fencing event; Danish women took the gold and bronze medals in that event. Ellen Osiier won the women's foil, becoming the first Olympic champion in women's fencing. The Danish men were not as successful, taking no medals in their six events.

Men

Ranks given are within the pool.

Fencer	Event	Round 1		Round 2		Quarterfinals		Semifinals		Final	
Fencer	Event	Result	Rank	Result	Rank	Result	Rank	Result	Rank	Result	Rank
Jens Berthelsen	Épée	2–7	8	N/A		did not advance					
Jens Berthelsen	Foil	2–0	1 Q	2–2	3 Q	1–4	6	did not advance			
Jens Berthelsen	Sabre	N/A				1–5	7	did not advance			
Svend Munck	Foil	1–3	4	did not advance							
Svend Munck	Sabre	N/A				0–6	7	did not advance			
Ivan Osiier	Épée	5–3	2 Q	N/A		6–4	5 Q	4–7	10	did not advance	
Ivan Osiier	Foil	2–0	1 Q	4–1	2 Q	2–3	4 Q	4–1	2 Q	1–5	6
Ivan Osiier	Sabre	N/A				4–2	2 Q	7–1	2 Q	2–5	6
Peter Ryefelt	Épée	4–4	2 Q	N/A		4–5	6 Q	5–6	5 Q	4–7	9
Erik Sjøqvist	Foil	1–3	4	did not advance							
Viggo Stilling-Andersen	Épée	4–3	8	N/A		did not advance					
Jens Berthelsen; Svend Munck; Ivan Osiier; Erik Sjøqvist	Team foil	Bye		N/A		1–2	2 Q	0–2	3	did not advance	
Jens Berthelsen; Ivan Osiier; Peter Ryefelt; Viggo Stilling-Andersen	Team épée	1–2	4	N/A		did not advance					
Jens Berthelsen; Ejnar Levison; Svend Munck; Ivan Osiier; Peter Ryefelt	Team sabre	1–0	2 Q	N/A		0–2	3	did not advance			

Women

Ranks given are within the pool.

Fencer	Event	Quarterfinals		Semifinals		Final	
Fencer	Event	Result	Rank	Result	Rank	Result	Rank
Yutta Barding	Foil	3–2	3 Q	2–3	3 Q	1–4	5
Ingeborg Buhl	Foil	2–3	4	did not advance			
Grete Heckscher	Foil	5–0	1 Q	4–1	2 Q	3–2	3rd place, bronze medalist(s)
Ellen Osiier	Foil	6–0	1 Q	5–0	1 Q	5–0	1st place, gold medalist(s)

== Modern pentathlon ==
Three pentathletes represented Denmark in 1924. It was the nation's third appearance in the sport. Denmark was one of six nations to have competed in each edition of the Olympic modern pentathlon.

Pentathlete	Event	Final	
Pentathlete	Event	Score	Rank
Marius Christensen	Individual	85	14
Helge Jensen	Individual	61	6
Otto Olsen	Individual	86	15

== Sailing ==
Four sailors represented Denmark in 1924. It was the nation's second appearance in the sport. The 6 metre class boat took silver, matching the nation's previous best result in sailing.

Sailor	Event	Qualifying				Final			
Sailor	Event	Race 1	Race 2	Race 3	Total	Race 1	Race 2	Total	Rank
Aage Pedersen	Olympic monotype	8 (DNF)	7	N/A		did not advance			
Knud Degn; Christian Nielsen; Vilhelm Vett	6 metre class	1 Q	2 Q	8	11	3	2	5	2nd place, silver medalist(s)

== Shooting ==
Seven sport shooters represented Denmark in 1924. It was the nation's sixth appearance in the sport as well as the Games; Denmark was one of three nations (along with France and Great Britain) to have competed in each Olympic sport shooting competition. Larsen took the bronze in the 600 metre free rifle for Denmark's only shooting medal in 1924.

Shooter	Event	Final	
Shooter	Event	Score	Rank
Hans Jacobsen	Trap	Unknown	31–44
Niels Larsen	600 m free rifle	94	3rd place, bronze medalist(s)
Lars Jørgen Madsen	50 m rifle, prone	386	24
Lars Jørgen Madsen	600 m free rifle	82	24
Anders Peter Nielsen	50 m rifle, prone	393	4
Anders Peter Nielsen	600 m free rifle	82	24
Arne Nielsen	50 m rifle, prone	389	12
Erik Sætter-Lassen	50 m rifle, prone	393	4
Erik Sætter-Lassen	600 m free rifle	75	46
Peter Petersen; Niels Larsen; Lars Jørgen Madsen; Anders Peter Nielsen; Erik Sætter-Lassen	Team free rifle	626	6

== Swimming ==
Ranks given are within the heat.

Women

Swimmer	Event	Heats		Semifinals		Final	
Swimmer	Event	Result	Rank	Result	Rank	Result	Rank
Vibeke Møller	400 m freestyle	7:02.2	3	did not advance			
Agnete Olsen	100 m freestyle	1:23.0	3	did not advance			
Karen Maud Rasmussen	100 m freestyle	1:29.0	5	did not advance			
Hedevig Rasmussen	100 m freestyle	1:22.4	3	did not advance			
Hedevig Rasmussen	400 m freestyle	6:58.2	3 q	6:55.2	4	did not advance	
Vibeke Møller; Agnete Olsen; Hedevig Rasmussen; Karen Maud Rasmussen	4 × 100 m freestyle relay	—N/a				5:42.4	4

== Tennis ==
Men

Athlete	Event	Round of 128	Round of 64	Round of 32	Round of 16	Quarterfinals	Semifinals	Final	
Athlete	Event	Opposition Score	Opposition Score	Opposition Score	Opposition Score	Opposition Score	Opposition Score	Opposition Score	Rank
Einar Bache	Singles	Lozano (MEX); W 2–6, 8–6, 9–7, 6–4	Bayley (AUS); L 2–6, 1–6, 2–6	did not advance					
Erik Tegner	Singles	von Kelemen (HUN); W 6–4, 6–1, 6–1	Nielsen (NOR); L 5–7, 6–4, 6–4, 9–7	did not advance					
Einer Ulrich	Singles	Bye	Timmer (NED); L 3–6, 6–2, 6–1, 2–6, 3–6	did not advance					
Bjørn Thalbitzer	Singles	Bye	Woosnam (GBR); L 1–6, 1–6, 2–6	did not advance					
Erik Tegner; Einer Ulrich	Doubles	—N/a	Sleem / Jacob (IND); W 6–3, 6–4, 4–6, 6–4	Debran / Syz (SUI); W 3–6, 6–0, 6–1, 6–1	Williams / Washburn (USA); L 4–6, 4–6, 10–12	did not advance			
Einar Bache; Bjørn Thalbitzer	Doubles	—N/a	Harada / Okamoto (ITA); L 0–6, 0–6, 1–6	did not advance					

Women

Athlete	Event	Round of 64	Round of 32	Round of 16	Quarterfinals	Semifinals	Final	
Athlete	Event	Opposition Score	Opposition Score	Opposition Score	Opposition Score	Opposition Score	Opposition Score	Rank
Elsebeth Brehm	Singles	Gagliardi (ITA); L 0–6, 2–6	did not advance					

Mixed

Athlete	Event	Round of 32	Round of 16	Quarterfinals	Semifinals	Final	
Athlete	Event	Opposition Score	Opposition Score	Opposition Score	Opposition Score	Opposition Score	Rank
Elsebeth Brehm; Erik Tegner	Doubles	de Borman / Halot (BEL); L 2–6, 4–6	did not advance				

== Wrestling ==
=== Freestyle wrestling ===
Men's

Athlete	Event	Round of 32	Round of 16	Quarterfinal	Semifinal	Final	
Athlete	Event	Opposition Result	Opposition Result	Opposition Result	Opposition Result	Opposition Result	Rank
Søren Eriksen	Lightweight	—N/a	Wikström (FIN); L	Did not advance	Bronze medal semifinal Haavisto (FIN); L	did not advance	
Poul Hansen	Light heavyweight	—N/a	Roth (SUI); W	Courant (SUI); L	did not advance		
Rasmus Torgensen	Featherweight	Bye	MacKenzie (GBR); W	Newton (USA); L	Bronze medal semifinal Hansson (SWE); L	did not advance	

=== Greco-Roman ===
Men's

Athlete	Event	First round	Second round	Third round	Fourth round	Fifth round	Sixth round	Seventh round	Eighth round	Rank
Athlete	Event	Opposition Result	Opposition Result	Opposition Result	Opposition Result	Opposition Result	Opposition Result	Opposition Result	Opposition Result	Rank
Hermann Andersen	Bantamweight	Dierickx (BEL); L	Martinsen (NOR); L	did not advance				—N/a		=17
Holger Askehave	Lightweight	Praks (EST); L	Pavlidis (GRE); W	Rękawek (POL); W	Friman (FIN); L	did not advance		—N/a		=9
John Christoffersen	Middleweight	Dumont (BEL); W	Vilciņš (LAT); W	Nilsson (SWE); L	Reinderman (NED); W	Westerlund (FIN); L	did not advance		—N/a	=7
Søren Eriksen	Featherweight	Toivola (FIN); L	Rudzits (LAT); W	Anttila (FIN); L	did not advance					=13
Frants Frisenfeldt	Lightweight	Michelsen (NOR); W	Coerse (NED); W	Solé (ESP); W	Kratochvíl (TCH); L	Keresztes (HUN); L	Did not advance	—N/a		=5
Georg Gundersen	Bantamweight	Bozděch (TCH); W	Herschmann (AUT); L	Retired; L	did not advance			—N/a		=17
Poul Hansen	Heavyweight	Deglane (FRA); L	Sint (NED); W	Nilsson (SWE); L	did not advance			—N/a		=9
Emil Larsen	Heavyweight	Polis (LAT); W	Badó (HUN); L	Salila (FIN); W	Pothier (BEL); W	Rosenqvist (FIN); L	Did not advance	—N/a		4
Svend Nielsen	Light heavyweight	Muijs (NED); W	Baumanis (LAT); W	Svensson (SWE); L	Retired; L	did not advance			—N/a	=9
Axel Tetens	Light heavyweight	Tázler (TCH); L	Sax (AUT); W	Westergren (SWE); L	did not advance				—N/a	=9
Rasmus Torgensen	Featherweight	Anttila (FIN); L	Quaqlia (ITA); W	Käpp (EST); W	Toivola (FIN); L	did not advance				=8
