= Latvia at the 1924 Summer Olympics =

- IOC code: LAT
- NOC: Latvian Olympic Committee

in Paris
- Competitors: 41
- Flag bearer: Arvīds Ķibilds
- Medals: Gold 0 Silver 0 Bronze 0 Total 0

Summer Olympics appearances (overview)
- 1924; 1928; 1932; 1936; 1948–1988; 1992; 1996; 2000; 2004; 2008; 2012; 2016; 2020; 2024

Other related appearances
- Russian Empire (1908–1912); Soviet Union (1952–1988)

Latvia competed at the Summer Olympic Games for the first time at the 1924 Summer Olympics in Paris, France.

== Athletics ==
Ten athletes represented Latvia in 1924. It was the nation's debut appearance in the sport as well as the Games.

Ranks given are within the heat.

Athlete	Event	Heats		Quarterfinals		Semifinals		Final	
Athlete	Event	Result	Rank	Result	Rank	Result	Rank	Result	Rank
Vilis Cimmermans	5000 m	N/A				Unknown	12	did not advance	
Vilis Cimmermans	10000 m	N/A						did not finish	
Artūrs Gedvillo	100 m	Unknown	5	did not advance					
Gvido Jekals	100 m	Unknown	5	did not advance					
Gvido Jekals	200 m	Unknown	3	did not advance					
Gvido Jekals	Decathlon	N/A						5981.670	14
Alfrēds Kalniņš	10 km walk	N/A				Disqualified		did not advance	
Arvīds Ķibilds	10 km walk	N/A				Disqualified		did not advance	
Arvīds Ķibilds	Shot put	N/A				12.53	9	did not advance	
Arvīds Ķibilds	Discus throw	N/A				35.79	6	did not advance	
Arvīds Ķibilds	Javelin throw	N/A				50.15	8	did not advance	
Artūrs Motmillers	5000 m	N/A				Unknown	13	did not advance	
Artūrs Motmillers	10000 m	N/A						32:44.0	10
Jānis Oja	100 m	Unknown	2 Q	Unknown	5	did not advance			
Jānis Oja	200 m	Unknown	2 Q	Unknown	4	did not advance			
Alfrēds Ruks	10 km walk	N/A				Disqualified		did not advance	
Oto Seviško	100 m	Unknown	2 Q	Unknown	5	did not advance			
Oto Seviško	200 m	Unknown	5	did not advance					
Teodors Sukatnieks	Discus throw	N/A				35.985	9	did not advance	

== Boxing ==
A single boxer represented Latvia at the 1924 Games. It was the nation's debut in the sport as well as the Olympics. Gutmans lost his only bout.

Boxer	Weight class	Round of 32	Round of 16	Quarterfinals	Semifinals	Final / Bronze match	
Boxer	Weight class	Opposition Score	Opposition Score	Opposition Score	Opposition Score	Opposition Score	Rank
Ernests Gūtmans	Lightweight	Nicolares (URU); L	did not advance				17

Opponent nation	Wins	Losses	Percent
Uruguay	0	1	.000
Total	0	1	.000

Round	Wins	Losses	Percent
Round of 32	0	1	.000
Round of 16	0	0	–
Quarterfinals	0	0	–
Semifinals	0	0	–
Final	0	0	–
Bronze match	0	0	–
Total	0	1	.000

== Cycling ==
Four cyclists represented Latvia in 1924. It was the nation's debut in the sport as well as the Games.

=== Track cycling ===
Ranks given are within the heat.

Cyclist	Event	First round		First repechage		Quarterfinals		Second repechage		Semifinals		Final	
Cyclist	Event	Result	Rank	Result	Rank	Result	Rank	Result	Rank	Result	Rank	Result	Rank
Roberts Plūme	Sprint	Unknown	3 r	Unknown	3	did not advance							
Artūrs Zeiberliņš	Sprint	Unknown	3 r	Unknown	2	did not advance							
Andrejs Aspītis; Roberts Plūme; Fridrihs Ukstiņš; Arturs Zeiberliņš	Team pursuit	Unknown	2	N/A		did not advance		N/A		did not advance			

== Football ==
Latvia competed in the Olympic football tournament for the first time in 1924.

Round 1
Bye

Round 2

May 27, 1924

France	7–0	Latvia
Crut 17' 28' 55'; Nicolas 25' 50'; Boyer 71' 87'	Report

Stade de Paris
Attendance: 15,000
Referee: Henri Christophe (BEL)

Final rank
9th place

== Weightlifting ==
Athlete	Event	1H Snatch	1H Clean & Jerk	Press	Snatch	Clean & Jerk	Total	Rank
Kārlis Leilands	Men's +82.5 kg	77.5	87.5	100.0	100.0	132.5	497.5	5
Alberts Ozoliņš	Men's -75 kg	67.5	82.5	77.5	X	112.5	340	25
Ēriks Rauska	Men's -67.5 kg	65	X	75	80	105	325	21
Ēriks Reihmanis	Men's -82.5 kg	65	82.5	85	85	112.5	430	15

== Wrestling ==
=== Greco-Roman ===
Men's

Athlete	Event	First round	Second round	Third round	Fourth round	Fifth round	Sixth round	Seventh round	Eighth round	Rank
Athlete	Event	Opposition Result	Opposition Result	Opposition Result	Opposition Result	Opposition Result	Opposition Result	Opposition Result	Opposition Result	Rank
Arnolds Baumanis	Light heavyweight	Sax (AUT); W	Nielsen (DEN); L	Retired; L	did not advance				—N/a	=12
Alberts Krievs	Bantamweight	van Maaren (NED); L	Magyar (HUN); L	did not advance				—N/a		=17
Jānis Polis	Heavyweight	Larsen (DEN); L	Giuria (ITA); W	Pothier (BEL); W	Badó (HUN); L	did not advance		—N/a		=5
Rūdolfs Ronis	Lightweight	Christoffel (BEL); W	Akbaş (TUR); W	Praks (EST); W	Keresztes (HUN); L	Retired; L	Did not advance	—N/a		=9
Jānis Rudzīts	Featherweight	Mezulian (AUT); L	Eriksen (DEN); L	did not advance						=18
Kārlis Vilciņš	Middleweight	Doll (NED); W	Christoffersen (DEN); L	Grbić (YUG); L	did not advance				—N/a	=15
