= Turkey at the 1924 Summer Olympics =

- IOC code: TUR
- NOC: Turkish National Olympic Committee

in Paris
- Flag bearer: Ünvan Tayfuroğlu
- Medals: Gold 0 Silver 0 Bronze 0 Total 0

Summer Olympics appearances (overview)
- 1908; 1912; 1920; 1924; 1928; 1932; 1936; 1948; 1952; 1956; 1960; 1964; 1968; 1972; 1976; 1980; 1984; 1988; 1992; 1996; 2000; 2004; 2008; 2012; 2016; 2020; 2024

Other related appearances
- 1906 Intercalated Games

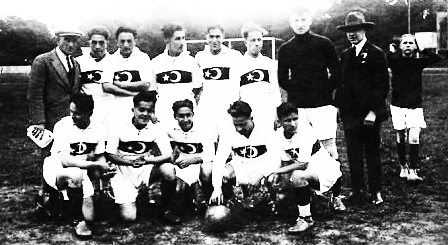
Turkey National Football Team on 25 May 1924.

Turkey competed at the 1924 Summer Olympics in Paris, France.

== Athletics ==
Twenty two athletes represented Turkey in 1924. It was the nation's second appearance in the sport.

Ranks given are within the heat.

Athlete	Event	Heats		Quarterfinals		Semifinals		Final	
Athlete	Event	Result	Rank	Result	Rank	Result	Rank	Result	Rank
Mohamed Burhan	200 m	Unknown	3	Did not advance					
Şekip Engineri	100 m	Unknown	6	Did not advance					
Rauf Hasağası	100 m	Unknown	6	Did not advance					
Ömer Besim Koşalay	1500 m	N/A				Unknown	8	Did not advance	

== Fencing ==
A single male fencer represented Turkey in 1924. It was the nation's debut in the sport.

Men

Ranks given are within the pool.

Fencer	Event	Round 1		Round 2		Quarterfinals		Semifinals		Final	
Fencer	Event	Result	Rank	Result	Rank	Result	Rank	Result	Rank	Result	Rank
Fuat Balkan	Sabre	N/A				1–4	6	Did not advance			

== Football ==
Turkey competed in the Olympic football tournament for the first time in 1924.

Round 1

May 25, 1924
15:30

Czechoslovakia	5–2	Turkey
Sloup 21'; Sedláček 28' 37'; Novák 64'; Čapek 74'	Report	Refet 63' 82'

Stade Bergeyre
Attendance: 5,000
Referee: P. Chr. Andersen (NOR)

Final rank
17th

== Weightlifting ==
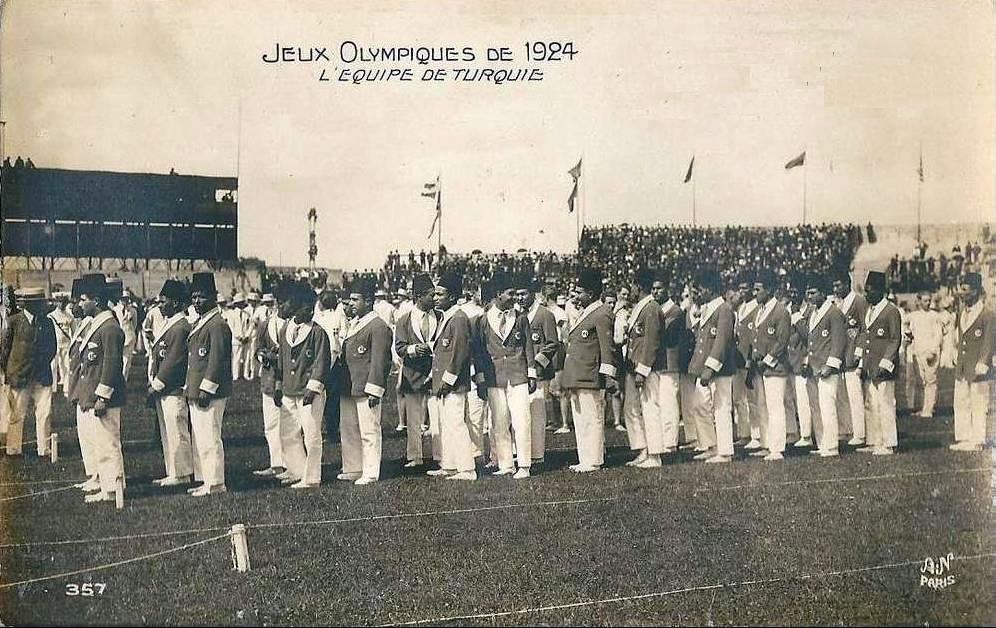
Turkey team at the games.

Athlete	Event	1H Snatch	1H Clean & Jerk	Press	Snatch	Clean & Jerk	Total	Rank
Cemal Erçman	Men's -60 kg	50	60	80	65	90	345	14

== Wrestling ==
=== Greco-Roman ===
Men's

Athlete	Event	First round	Second round	Third round	Fourth round	Fifth round	Sixth round	Seventh round	Eighth round	Rank
Athlete	Event	Opposition Result	Opposition Result	Opposition Result	Opposition Result	Opposition Result	Opposition Result	Opposition Result	Opposition Result	Rank
Fuat Akbaş	Lightweight	Westerlund (FIN); L	Ronis (LAT); L	Did not advance				—N/a		=20
Seyfi Berksoy	Light heavyweight	Westergren (SWE); L	Svensson (SWE); L	Did not advance					—N/a	=12
Mazhar Çakin	Bantamweight	Herschmann (AUT); L	Dierickx (BEL); L	Did not advance				—N/a		=17
Dűrrũ Sade	Middleweight	Westerlund (FIN); L	Reinderman (NED); L	Did not advance					—N/a	=20
Tayyar Yalaz	Middleweight	Vidal (ESP); W	Clody (FRA); W	Lindfors (FIN); L	Okulicz-Kozaryn (POL); L	Did not advance			—N/a	=9
