= Wrestling at the 1924 Summer Olympics – Men's Greco-Roman middleweight =

Wrestling at the Olympics

Men's middleweight Greco-Roman wrestling at the Games of the VIII Olympiad
- Venue: Vélodrome d'Hiver
- Dates: July 6–10, 1924
- Competitors: 27 from 19 nations

Medalists
1st place, gold medalist(s)		Edvard Westerlund	Finland
2nd place, silver medalist(s)		Arthur Lindfors	Finland
3rd place, bronze medalist(s)		Roman Steinberg	Estonia

The men's Greco-Roman middleweight was a Greco-Roman wrestling event held as part of the Wrestling at the 1924 Summer Olympics programme. It was the fourth appearance of the event. Middleweight was the third-heaviest category, including wrestlers weighing 67 to 75 kilograms.

== Results ==
Source: Official results; Wudarski

The tournament was double-elimination.

=== First round ===
Losses	Winner	Loser	Losses
0	Viktor Fischer (AUT)	Giuseppe Gorletti (ITA)	1
0	Paul Jahren (NOR)	Amadeo Gorgano (ITA)	1
0	Sándor Kónyi (HUN)	Oldřich Pštros (TCH)	1
0	Émile Clody (FRA)	Jules Grandjean (SUI)	1
0	Tayyar Yalaz (TUR)	Eladio Vidal (ESP)	1
0	Arthur Lindfors (FIN)	Adolphe Dumont (LUX)	1
0	Wacław Okulicz-Kozaryn (POL)	Louis Veuve (SUI)	1
0	Nikola Grbić (YUG)	Carl Nilsson (SWE)	1
0	Kārlis Vilciņš (LAT)	Wilhelmus Doll (NED)	1
0	John Christoffersen (DEN)	Jean Dumont (BEL)	1
0	Edvard Westerlund (FIN)	Dűrrũ Sade (TUR)	1
0	Jan Reinderman (NED)	Jean Domas (FRA)	1
0	Roman Steinberg (EST)	Ferenc Györgyei (HUN)	1
0	František Pražský (TCH)	Bye	–

=== Second round ===
Losses	Winner	Loser	Losses
1	Giuseppe Gorletti (ITA)	František Pražský (TCH)	1
0	Viktor Fischer (AUT)	Amadeo Gorgano (ITA)	2
0	Sándor Kónyi (HUN)	Paul Jahren (NOR)	1
1	Oldřich Pštros (TCH)	Jules Grandjean (SUI)	2
0	Tayyar Yalaz (TUR)	Émile Clody (FRA)	1
1	Eladio Vidal (ESP)	Adolphe Dumont (LUX)	2
0	Arthur Lindfors (FIN)	Wacław Okulicz-Kozaryn (POL)	1
0	Nikola Grbić (YUG)	Louis Veuve (SUI)	2
1	Carl Nilsson (SWE)	Wilhelmus Doll (NED)	2
0	John Christoffersen (DEN)	Kārlis Vilciņš (LAT)	1
0	Edvard Westerlund (FIN)	Jean Dumont (BEL)	2
0	Jan Reinderman (NED)	Dűrrũ Sade (TUR)	2
1	Jean Domas (FRA)	Ferenc Györgyei (HUN)	2
0	Roman Steinberg (EST)	Bye	–

=== Third round ===
Losses	Winner	Loser	Losses
0	Roman Steinberg (EST)	František Pražský (TCH)	2
1	Giuseppe Gorletti (ITA)	Paul Jahren (NOR)	2
0	Viktor Fischer (AUT)	Sándor Kónyi (HUN)	1
1	Oldřich Pštros (TCH)	Émile Clody (FRA)	2
0	Arthur Lindfors (FIN)	Tayyar Yalaz (TUR)	1
1	Wacław Okulicz-Kozaryn (POL)	Eladio Vidal (ESP)	2
0	Nikola Grbić (YUG)	Kārlis Vilciņš (LAT)	2
1	Carl Nilsson (SWE)	John Christoffersen (DEN)	1
0	Edvard Westerlund (FIN)	Jan Reinderman (NED)	1
1	Jean Domas (FRA)	Bye	–

=== Fourth round ===
Losses	Winner	Loser	Losses
0	Roman Steinberg (EST)	Jean Domas (FRA)	2
1	Giuseppe Gorletti (ITA)	Sándor Kónyi (HUN)	2
0	Viktor Fischer (AUT)	Oldřich Pštros (TCH)	2
0	Arthur Lindfors (FIN)	Nikola Grbić (YUG)	1
1	Wacław Okulicz-Kozaryn (POL)	Tayyar Yalaz (TUR)	2
0	Edvard Westerlund (FIN)	Carl Nilsson (SWE)	2
1	John Christoffersen (DEN)	Jan Reinderman (NED)	2

=== Fifth round ===
Losses	Winner	Loser	Losses
1	Giuseppe Gorletti (ITA)	Roman Steinberg (EST)	1
0	Arthur Lindfors (FIN)	Viktor Fischer (AUT)	1
1	Nikola Grbić (YUG)	Wacław Okulicz-Kozaryn (POL)	2
0	Edvard Westerlund (FIN)	John Christoffersen (DEN)	2

=== Sixth round ===
After this round, the undefeated Lindfors and Westerlund and the one-loss Steinberg were left. Lindfors and Westerlund advanced to the seventh round to face each other for gold, while Steinberg received the bronze.

Losses	Winner	Loser	Losses
0	Arthur Lindfors (FIN)	Giuseppe Gorletti (ITA)	2
1	Roman Steinberg (EST)	Viktor Fischer (AUT)	2
0	Edvard Westerlund (FIN)	Nikola Grbić (YUG)	2

=== Seventh round ===
Losses	Winner	Loser	Losses
0	Edvard Westerlund (FIN)	Arthur Lindfors (FIN)	1
