= Wrestling at the 1924 Summer Olympics – Men's Greco-Roman heavyweight =

Wrestling at the Olympics

Men's heavyweight Greco-Roman wrestling at the Games of the VIII Olympiad
- Venue: Vélodrome d'Hiver
- Dates: July 6–10, 1924
- Competitors: 17 from 10 nations

Medalists
1st place, gold medalist(s)		Henri Deglane	France
2nd place, silver medalist(s)		Edil Rosenqvist	Finland
3rd place, bronze medalist(s)		Rajmund Badó	Hungary

The men's Greco-Roman heavyweight was a Greco-Roman wrestling event held as part of the Wrestling at the 1924 Summer Olympics programme. It was the third appearance of the event. Heavyweight was the heaviest category, including wrestlers weighing over 82.5 kilograms.

== Results ==
Source: Official results; Wudarski

The tournament was double-elimination.

=== First round ===
Losses	Winner	Loser	Losses
0	Emil Larsen (DEN)	Jānis Polis (LAT)	1
0	Johan Salila (FIN)	Marcello Giuria (ITA)	1
0	Lucien Pothier (BEL)	Jaap Sjouwerman (NED)	1
0	Claes Johansson (SWE)	Ottó Szelky (HUN)	1
0	Jean Deglane (FRA)	Poul Hansen (DEN)	1
0	Jan Sint (NED)	Aleardo Donati (ITA)	1
0	Edil Rosenqvist (FIN)	Ernst Nilsson (SWE)	1
0	Edmond Dame (FRA)	Franz Mileder (AUT)	1
0	Rajmund Badó (HUN)	Bye	–

=== Second round ===
Losses	Winner	Loser	Losses
0	Rajmund Badó (HUN)	Emil Larsen (DEN)	1
1	Jānis Polis (LAT)	Marcello Giuria (ITA)	2
0	Lucien Pothier (BEL)	Johan Salila (FIN)	1
1	Ottó Szelky (HUN)	Jaap Sjouwerman (NED)	2
0	Jean Deglane (FRA)	Claes Johansson (SWE)	1
1	Poul Hansen (DEN)	Jan Sint (NED)	1
1	Ernst Nilsson (SWE)	Aleardo Donati (ITA)	2
0	Edil Rosenqvist (FIN)	Franz Mileder (AUT)	2
0	Edmond Dame (FRA)	Bye	–

After 20 minutes, Johansson was declared the winner over Deglane on points. French officials protested, and the two wrestlers were ordered to wrestle for another 6 minutes. Deglane was declared the victor, and Johansson was so disgusted with the result that he withdrew from the competition.

=== Third round ===
Losses	Winner	Loser	Losses
0	Rajmund Badó (HUN)	Edmond Dame (FRA)	1
1	Emil Larsen (DEN)	Johan Salila (FIN)	2
1	Jānis Polis (LAT)	Lucien Pothier (BEL)	1
0	Jean Deglane (FRA)	Ottó Szelky (HUN)	2
1	Ernst Nilsson (SWE)	Poul Hansen (DEN)	2
0	Edil Rosenqvist (FIN)	Jan Sint (NED)	2
–	Abandoned	Claes Johansson (SWE)	–

=== Fourth round ===
Losses	Winner	Loser	Losses
0	Rajmund Badó (HUN)	Jānis Polis (LAT)	2
0	Edil Rosenqvist (FIN)	Edmond Dame (FRA)	2
1	Emil Larsen (DEN)	Lucien Pothier (BEL)	2
0	Jean Deglane (FRA)	Ernst Nilsson (SWE)	2

=== Fifth round ===
After this round, the undefeated Deglane and Rosenqvist and the one-loss Badó were left. Deglane and Rosenqvist advanced to the sixth round to face each other for gold, while Badó received the bronze.

Losses	Winner	Loser	Losses
0	Jean Deglane (FRA)	Rajmund Badó (HUN)	1
0	Edil Rosenqvist (FIN)	Emil Larsen (DEN)	2

=== Sixth round ===
Losses	Winner	Loser	Losses
0	Jean Deglane (FRA)	Edil Rosenqvist (FIN)	1
