= Franz Mileder =

Austrian wrestler

- Born: 15 February 1891
- Died: Unknown

Franz Mileder (born 15 February 1891, date of death unknown) was an Austrian wrestler. He competed in the Greco-Roman heavyweight event at the 1924 Summer Olympics. At the 1911 Unofficial World Championships, Mileder won a bronze medal.
