= Robert Oksa =

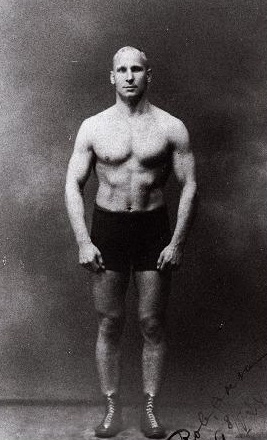
- Robert Oksa in 1924

Personal information
- Born: 13 February 1893; Turku, Grand Duchy of Finland
- Died: 30 May 1967 (aged 74); Stockholm, Sweden

Sport
- Sport: Greco-Roman wrestling
- Club: TuUL, Riento, Weikot

Robert Aleksander Oksa (13 February 1893 – 30 May 1967) was a Finnish-born wrestler and wrestling coach. He was the head coach of the Estonian and Swedish national teams in the 1920s–1950s.

== Life ==
Oksa was a railroad worker who won three Finnish championship titles in Greco-Roman wrestling in 1915–1917. During the 1917 General Strike, Oksa joined the Turku militia and in the 1918 Civil War of Finland he fought for the Red Guards. In April 1918, Oksa was captured by the German troops and sent to the Tammisaari prison camp, but he managed to escape and fled to Sweden. Oksa also shortly lived in St. Petersburg where he was acquainted with the members of the exile Communist Party of Finland.

In 1923–1924, Oksa was the head coach of the Estonian national wrestling team. One of his personal trainees was the 1924 Olympic bronze medalist Roman Steinberg. In 1924, Oksa returned Finland and worked as the head coach of the Finnish Workers' Sports Federation. In July 1926, Oksa was hired by the Swedish Wrestling Federation. During his coaching period, the Swedish wrestlers won 21 Olympic gold medals between 1928 and 1952. According to the 1952 gold medalist Viking Palm, Oksa raised Swedish wrestling into glory out of nothing. Oksa was granted the Swedish citizenship in 1944.

== Other ==
In 1915, the prominent Finnish sculptor Wäinö Aaltonen made a body sculpture of Oksa. After the Civil War, Aaltonen used it as a model for the White Guard memorial erected in Savonlinna. Since Oksa had fought for the Reds, his head was replaced by the head of the poet Aaro Hellaakoski.
