= Louis Veuve =

Swiss wrestler

Personal information
- Full name: Louis Florian Veuve
- Born: 19 September 1899
- Died: 25 December 1969 (aged 70) Chézard-Saint-Martin

Sport
- Country: Switzerland
- Sport: Greco-Roman wrestling
- Weight class: Middleweight

Louis Florian Veuve (19 September 1899 – 25 December 1969) was a Swiss wrestler. He competed in the Greco-Roman middleweight event at the 1924 Summer Olympics.
