= Eladio Vidal =

Spanish wrestler

- Born: 8 January 1897

Eladio Vidal (born 8 January 1897, date of death unknown) was a Spanish wrestler. He competed during the 1920s, representing the Ateneu Enciclopèdic Popular in Barcelona. He earned the title of champion of Spain and Catalonia. He competed in the Greco-Roman middleweight event at the 1924 Summer Olympics.
