= Viktor Legát =

Czech swimmer

Personal information
- Born: 23 April 1900 Prague, Austria-Hungary

Sport
- Sport: Swimming

Viktor Legát (born 23 April 1900; date of death unknown) was a Czech swimmer. He competed in three events at the 1924 Summer Olympics.
