= Jānis Rudzītis =

Latvian wrestler (1903–1967)

- Born: 17 November 1903
- Died: 5 November 1967 (aged 63)
- Olympic team: 1924

Jānis Rudzītis (17 November 1903 – 5 November 1967) was a Latvian wrestler. He competed in the Greco-Roman featherweight event at the 1924 Summer Olympics.
