= Rudolf Piowaty =

Czech swimmer (1900–1978)

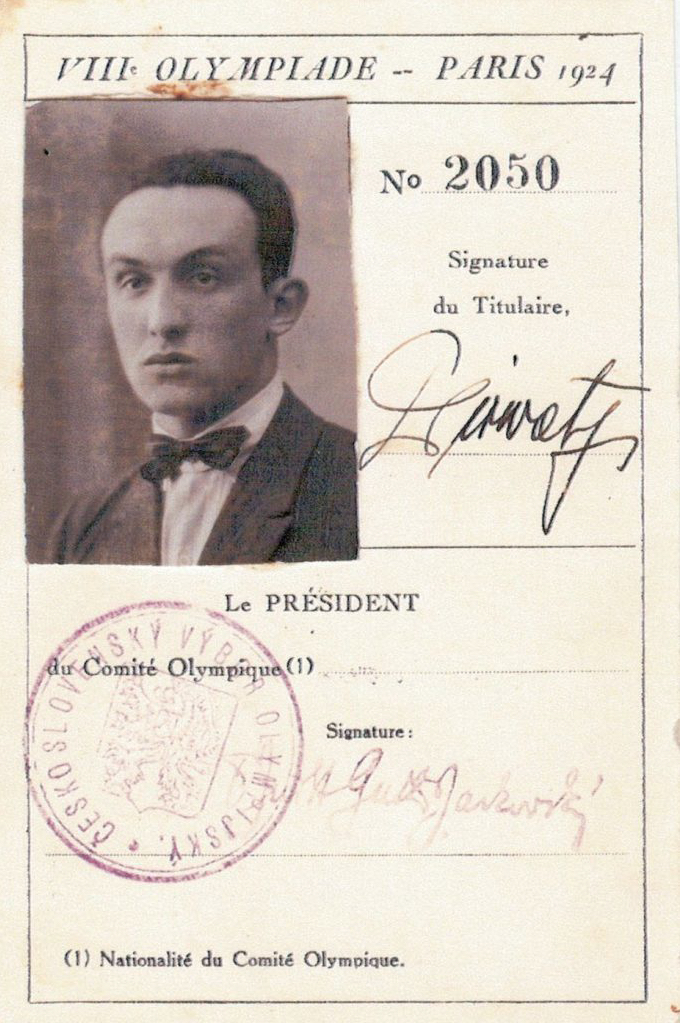
- Rudolf Piowaty Athlete's ID from the 1924 Paris Olympics

Personal information
- Nationality: Czechoslovak
- Born: 28 April 1900 Brno, Moravia, Austria-Hungary
- Died: 29 January 1978 (aged 77) Paris, Yukon, Canada

Sport
- Sport: Swimming
- Strokes: Freestyle, Breaststroke
- Club: Makabi Brno; Bar Kochba Brno

Rudolf Piowaty (28 April 1900 – 29 January 1978) was a Czech swimmer who competed for Czechoslovakia in two events in the 1924 Paris Olympics.

Piowaty joined the Czechoslovak military at the end of World War I, where he began serving in October 1921, and eventually became an officer. While in the Army, he trained to become an elite swimmer, capturing his first Czechoslovak title in 1921. Over the next several years, he continued to win titles at the National level, leading him to qualify for the 1924 Paris Olympics.

== 1924 Olympics ==
He competed in two events at the 1924 Summer Olympics in mid-July in Paris. In team events, he was a member of the Men's 4 x 200 metres Freestyle Relay with the Czech team, that swam a combined time of 11.12.8, placing third in the third preliminary heat, though the team did not swim in the semi-finals. He also swam in the Men's 200-meter breaststroke, making it to the semi-finals with a time of 3:11.8, though he did not qualify for the finals.

Piowaty was Jewish. He was a member of Czechoslovak Army in the interwar period. In his free time he was perfecting his swimming skills in Jewish sport clubs Makabi Brno and Bar Kochba Brno.

In July 1942, three years into the occupation of Czechoslovakia by Nazi forces, he managed to escape from the Protectorate of Bohemia and Moravia to Switzerland, swimming through Bodensee from the German side. He spent the wartime in Geneva helping the Czech delegate at the League of Nations in the Information Office. After World War II, he returned to Czechoslovakia, where he continued to serve in the military.

After the communist coup d'etat of 1948, Piowaty emigrated with the whole family to Canada, where he worked as a furniture merchant. He died on 29 January1978 in Paris, Ontario, Canada.
