= Marcello Giuria =

Italian wrestler

- Born: 2 October 1891; Genoa, Italy

Marcello Giuria (born 2 October 1891, date of death unknown) was an Italian wrestler. He competed in the Greco-Roman heavyweight event at the 1924 Summer Olympics.
