= Jules Grandjean =

Swiss wrestler

- Born: 1898

Jules Grandjean (born 1898, date of death unknown) was a Swiss wrestler. He competed in the Greco-Roman middleweight event at the 1924 Summer Olympics.
