= Stanislav Bičák =

Czech swimmer

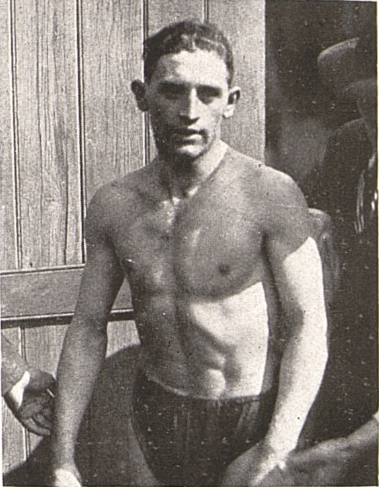

Personal information
- Born: 13 November 1905 Prague, Austria-Hungary
- Died: 27 January 1947 (aged 41) Prague, Czechoslovakia

Sport
- Sport: Swimming

Stanislav Bičák (13 November 1905 – 27 January 1947) was a Czech swimmer. He competed in three events at the 1924 Summer Olympics.
