= Arvīds Ķibilds =

Latvian athlete

Personal information
- Nationality: Latvian
- Born: 2 November 1895
- Died: 9 November 1980 (aged 85)

Sport
- Sport: Athletics

Arvīds Ķibilds (2 November 1895 – 9 November 1980) was a Latvian athlete. He competed in four events at the 1924 Summer Olympics.
