= Nikola Grbić (wrestler) =

Yugoslav wrestler (1899–1973)

- Born: 2 February 1899; Svračkovo Selo, Austria-Hungary
- Died: 2 December 1973 (aged 74); Buenos Aires, Argentina

Nikola Grbić (2 February 1899 – 2 December 1973) was a Yugoslav wrestler. He competed in the Greco-Roman middleweight event at the 1924 Summer Olympics.
