= Wacław Okulicz-Kozaryn =

Polish wrestler

- Born: 8 February 1884; Vymno, Vitebsk Governorate, Russian Empire
- Died: 14 April 1974 (aged 90); Warsaw, Poland

Wacław Okulicz-Kozaryn (8 February 1884 – 14 April 1974) was a Polish wrestler. He competed in the Greco-Roman middleweight event at the 1924 Summer Olympics.
