= Ferenc Györgyei =

Hungarian wrestler

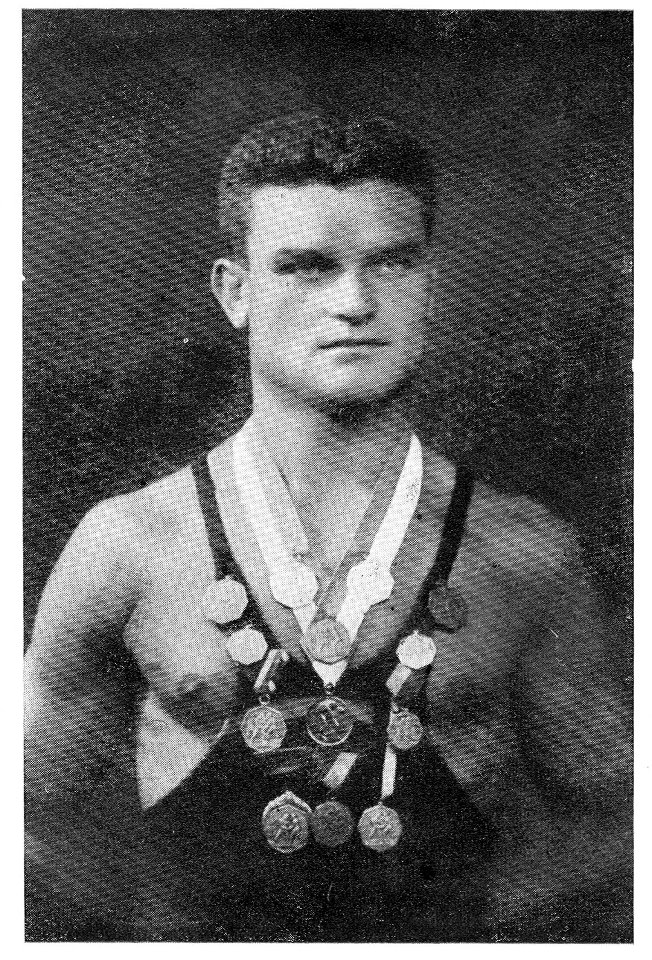
- Born: 29 November 1899; Budapest, Hungary
- Died: 26 August 1970 (aged 70)

Ferenc Györgyei (29 November 1899 – 26 August 1970) was a Hungarian wrestler. He competed in the Greco-Roman middleweight event at the 1924 Summer Olympics.
