= Jean Dumont (wrestler) =

Belgian wrestler

- Born: 12 January 1886
- Died: 13 July 1960 (aged 74)

Jean Dumont (12 January 1886 – 13 July 1960) was a Belgian wrestler. He competed in the Greco-Roman middleweight event at the 1924 Summer Olympics.
