= Tayyar Yalaz =

Turkish wrestler (1901–1943)

- Born: 1901; Istanbul, Turkey
- Died: 12 October 1943 (aged 41–42)

Tayyar Yalaz (1901 – 12 October 1943) was a Turkish sport wrestler, who competed at the 1924 and 1928 Olympics.

He was born in 1901 in Istanbul and began wrestling at Kuleli Military High School in Istanbul. Tayyar Yalaz participated at the Summer Olympics in Paris, France and in Amsterdam, Netherlands. In 1928, he wrestled in the 67 kg division and became 4th, which was the best place Turkey has ever received at the Olympics.

He served as the president of the Turkish Wrestling Federation from 1938 on until his death in 1943. He had the rank of a major.
