= Han van Senus =

Dutch water polo player (1900–1976)

Personal information
- Full name: Antonie Hendrikus Catharinus van Senus
- Nationality: Netherlands
- Born: 10 October 1900 Rotterdam, the Netherlands
- Died: 9 December 1976 (aged 76) Capelle aan den IJssel, the Netherlands

Sport
- Sport: Water polo

Senior clubs
- Years: Team
- –: 't IJ Amsterdam
National team
- Years: Team
- ?-?: Netherlands

Antonie Hendrikus Catharinus "Han" van Senus (10 October 1900 - 9 December 1976) was a Dutch male water polo player. He was a member of the Netherlands men's national water polo team. He competed with the team at the 1924 Summer Olympics and 1928 Summer Olympics.

He was the brother of water polo player Pieter van Senus, who also competed at the 1924 and 1928 Olympics for the national team.
