= Pieter van Senus =

Dutch swimmer (1903–1968)

Personal information
- Full name: Pieter François van Senus
- Born: 8 December 1903 Rotterdam, Netherlands
- Died: 23 September 1968 (aged 64) Rotterdam, Netherlands

Sport
- Sport: Swimming, water polo
- Club: Amsterdamsche Zwemclub 1870

Pieter van Senus (8 December 1903 – 23 September 1968) was a Dutch swimmer and water polo player. He competed in the men's 100 metre backstroke event at the 1924 Summer Olympics and the water polo at the 1928 Summer Olympics.

Pieter is the younger brother of water polo player Han van Senus, who was part of the national team at the 1924 Summer Olympics and also at the 1928 Summer Olympics.
