= Jean Domas =

French wrestler

- Born: 1892
- Died: Unknown

Jean Domas (born 1892, date of death unknown) was a French wrestler. He competed in the Greco-Roman middleweight event at the 1924 Summer Olympics.
