= Paul Jahren =

Norwegian sport wrestler

- Born: 17 January 1895; Oslo, Norway
- Died: 6 September 1963 (aged 68); Oslo, Norway

Paul Jahren (17 January 1895 – 6 September 1963) was a Norwegian sport wrestler. He was born in Kristiania and represented the club Fagforeningens IL. He competed at the 1924 Summer Olympics, in Greco-Roman wrestling, when he tied 15th in the middleweight class.
