= Roman Steinberg =

Estonian wrestler (1900–1939)

Personal information
- Born: 5 April 1900 Massu, Governorate of Estonia, Russian Empire
- Died: 20 May 1939 (aged 39) Tallinn, Estonia
Medal record
Men's Greco-Roman wrestling
Representing Estonia
Olympic Games
Bronze medal – third place	1924 Paris	75 kg

Roman Steinberg (after 1938, Roman Kivimägi; 5 April 1900 – 20 May 1939), was an Estonian Greco-Roman wrestling bronze medal winner in middleweight class at the 1924 Summer Olympics in Paris, France. Steinberg was also three times Estonian wrestling champion 1921–1923, coached by Robert Oksa. He died after contracting tuberculosis, age 39, and was buried at Alexander Nevsky Cemetery, Tallinn.

== See also ==
- Estonia at the 1924 Summer Olympics
