= Oldřich Pštros =

Czech wrestler

- Born: 1903
- Died: 18 October 1971 (aged 67–68)

Oldřich Pštros (1903 – 18 October 1971) was a Czech wrestler. He competed in the Greco-Roman middleweight event at the 1924 Summer Olympics.
