= Wilhelmus Doll =

Dutch wrestler (1900–1980)

- Born: 27 October 1900; Amsterdam, Netherlands
- Died: 15 May 1980 (aged 79); Amsterdam, Netherlands

Wilhelmus Doll (27 October 1900 – 15 May 1980) was a Dutch wrestler. He competed in the Greco-Roman middleweight event at the 1924 Summer Olympics.
