= Jean Lacoste =

French-German philosopher, scholar and essayist

Jean Lacoste (born 1950 in Paris) is a French-German philosopher, scholar and essayist. He is known for his research on Nietzsche, Goethe, Walter Benjamin and Ernst Cassirer. He is currently a philosophy professor at the Ecole Normale Supérieure.

== Publications ==
- La Philosophie aujourd'hui
- La philosophie de l'art
- Goethe
- Les chemins du labyrinthe
- Qu'est-Ce Que Le Beau
- Goethe, science et philosophie
- Le "Voyage en Italie" de Goethe
- La philosophie au XXème siècle. Introduction à la pensée. philosophique. contemporaine. Essai et textes, Paris, Hatier, 1988
