= Dűrrũ Sade =

Turkish wrestler

Dürrü Sade
- Born: 1902
- Died: September 23, 1979 (aged 76–77)

Dürrü Sade (1902 – September 23, 1979) was a Turkish wrestler. He competed in the Greco-Roman middleweight event at the 1924 Summer Olympics.
