= Sándor Kónyi =

Hungarian wrestler (1901–1976)

Sándor Kónyi (3 September 1901 – 20 November 1976) was a Hungarian wrestler. He competed in the Greco-Roman middleweight event at the 1924 Summer Olympics.
