= Ahmed Rahmy =

Egyptian wrestler

Personal information
- Nationality: Egyptian
- Born: 1894 Cairo
- Died: Unknown

Sport
- Sport: Wrestling

Ahmed Rahmy (born 1894, date of death unknown) was an Egyptian wrestler. He competed at the 1920 and 1924 Summer Olympics.
