= Ottó Szelky =

Hungarian wrestler

- Born: 30 January 1895
- Died: 21 July 1929 (aged 34)

Ottó Szelky (30 January 1895 – 21 July 1929) was a Hungarian wrestler. He competed in the Greco-Roman heavyweight event at the 1924 Summer Olympics. He won four national championships between 1919 and 1927.
