= Jan Novák (footballer, born 1896) =

Czechoslovak footballer

Personal information
- Date of birth: 5 July 1896
- Place of birth: Kladno, Austria-Hungary
- Date of death: 10 April 1968 (aged 71)

International career
Years	Team	Apps	(Gls)
1924	Czechoslovakia	2	(1)

Jan Novák (5 July 1896 – 10 April 1968) was a Czechoslovak footballer. He competed in the men's tournament at the 1924 Summer Olympics. On a club level, he played for SK Židenice.
