= Émile Clody =

French wrestler

- Born: 7 August 1903
- Died: 28 June 1960 (aged 56)

Émile Clody (7 August 1903 – 28 June 1960) was a French wrestler. He competed at the 1924 and the 1928 Summer Olympics.
