= Giuseppe Gorletti =

Italian wrestler

- Born: 28 August 1891; Milan, Italy
- Died: 29 March 1986 (aged 94); Milan, Italy

Giuseppe Gorletti (28 August 1891 – 29 March 1986) was an Italian wrestler. He competed at the 1920 and the 1924 Summer Olympics.
