= Piscine des Tourelles =

Municipal swimming pool in Paris, France

Coordinates: 48.8754°N 2.4062°E

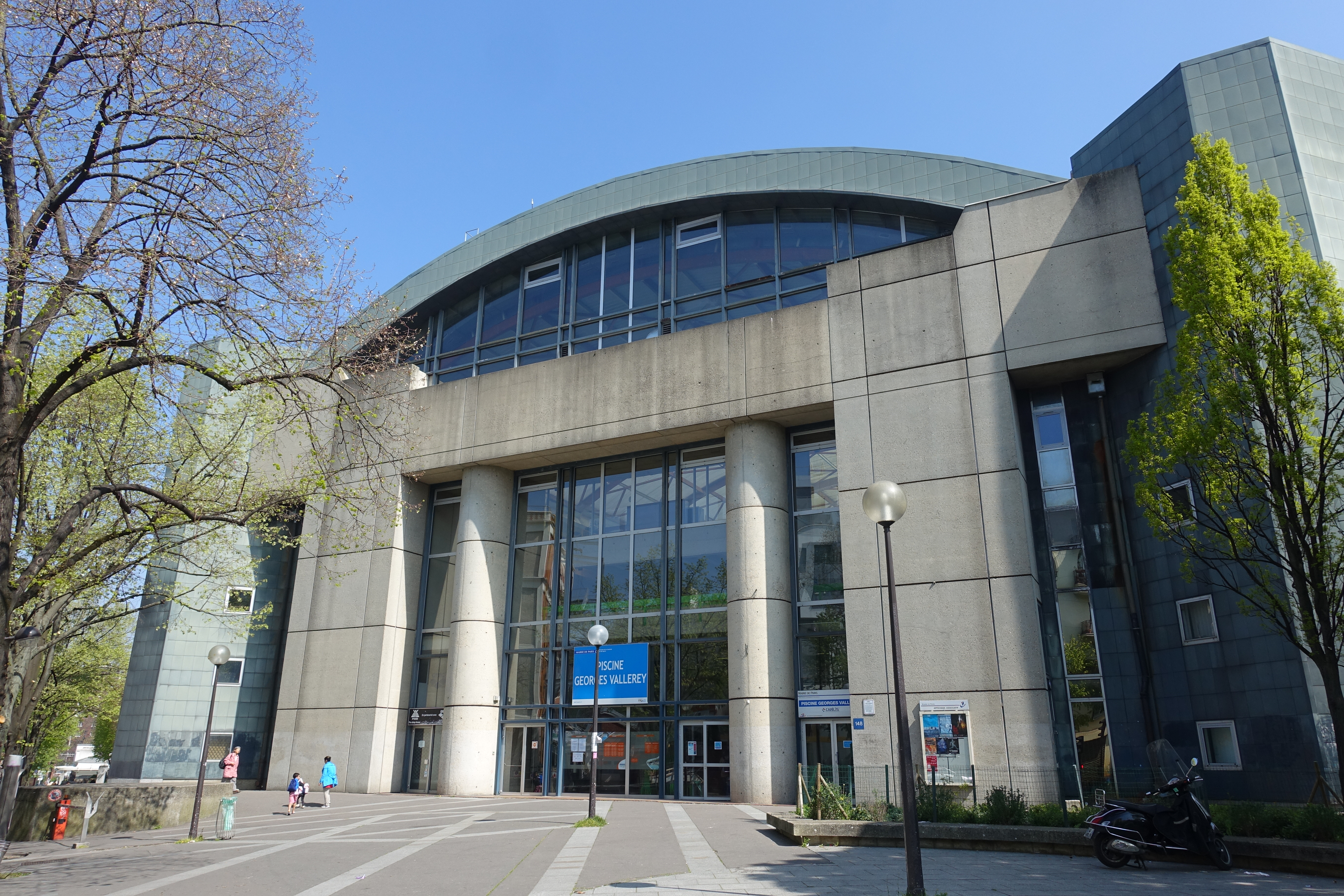
Piscine Georges Vallerey in 2017

The Piscine des Tourelles, sometimes listed as Le stade nautique des Tourelles, is an aquatics venue that was used to host the diving, swimming, water polo, and the swimming portion of the modern pentathlon events for the 1924 Summer Olympics. Located in the 20th arrondissement of Paris, it hosted eleven swimming, diving, and one water polo during those games. Attendance at the games totaled 51,000 for all eight event days.

In 1989, it underwent extensive renovation, and reopened as the Piscine Georges Vallerey, after French swimmer Georges Vallerey Jr., who competed in the 1948 Summer Olympics; the complex is nevertheless still widely known by its old name. The renovated pool is 50 meters in length but can be divided into two unequal parts by an underwater partition. A retractable roof was also installed as part of the renovation, allowing sunbathing when the weather is fine.

== Gallery ==
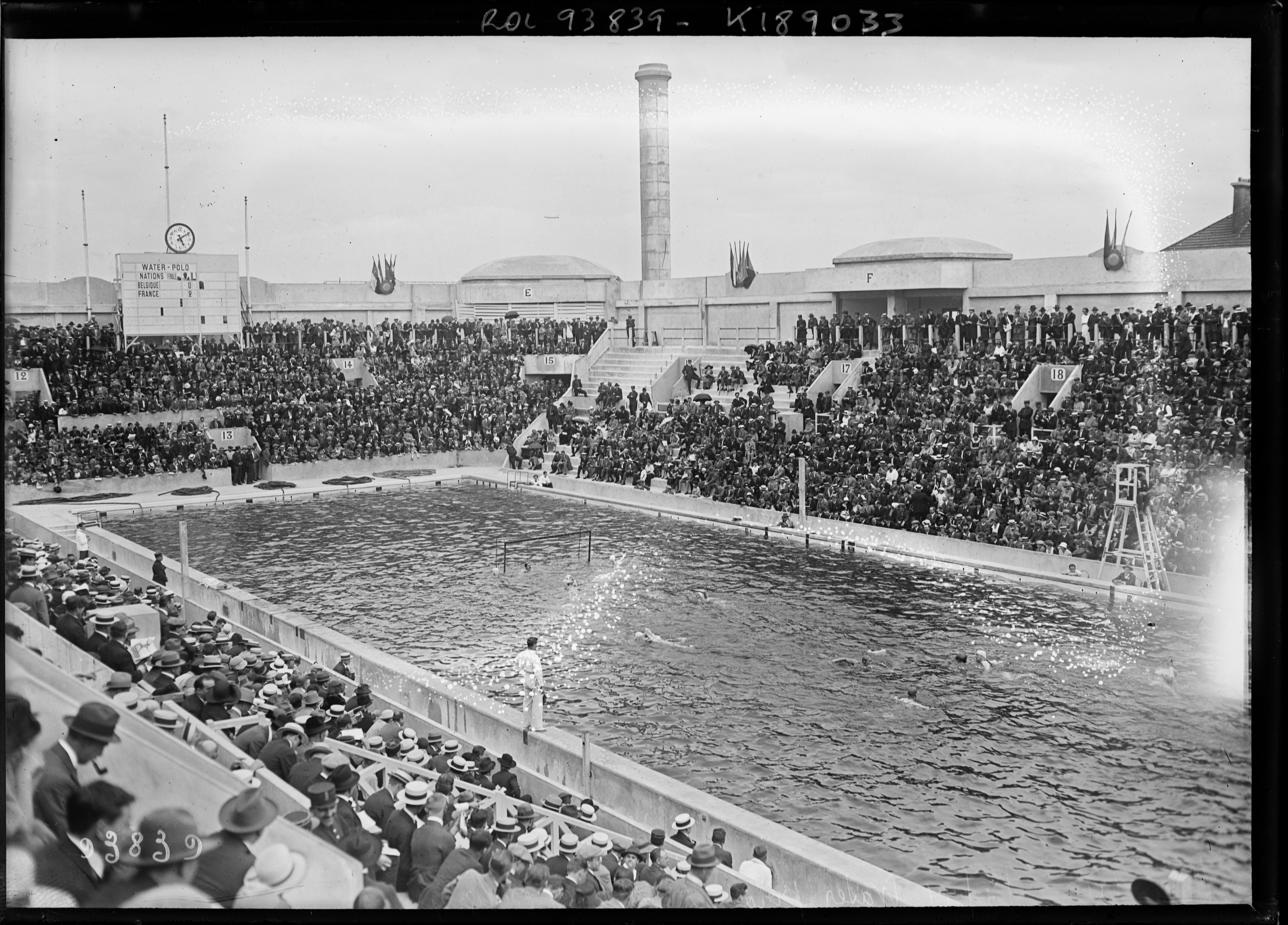
During the 1924 Summer Olympics

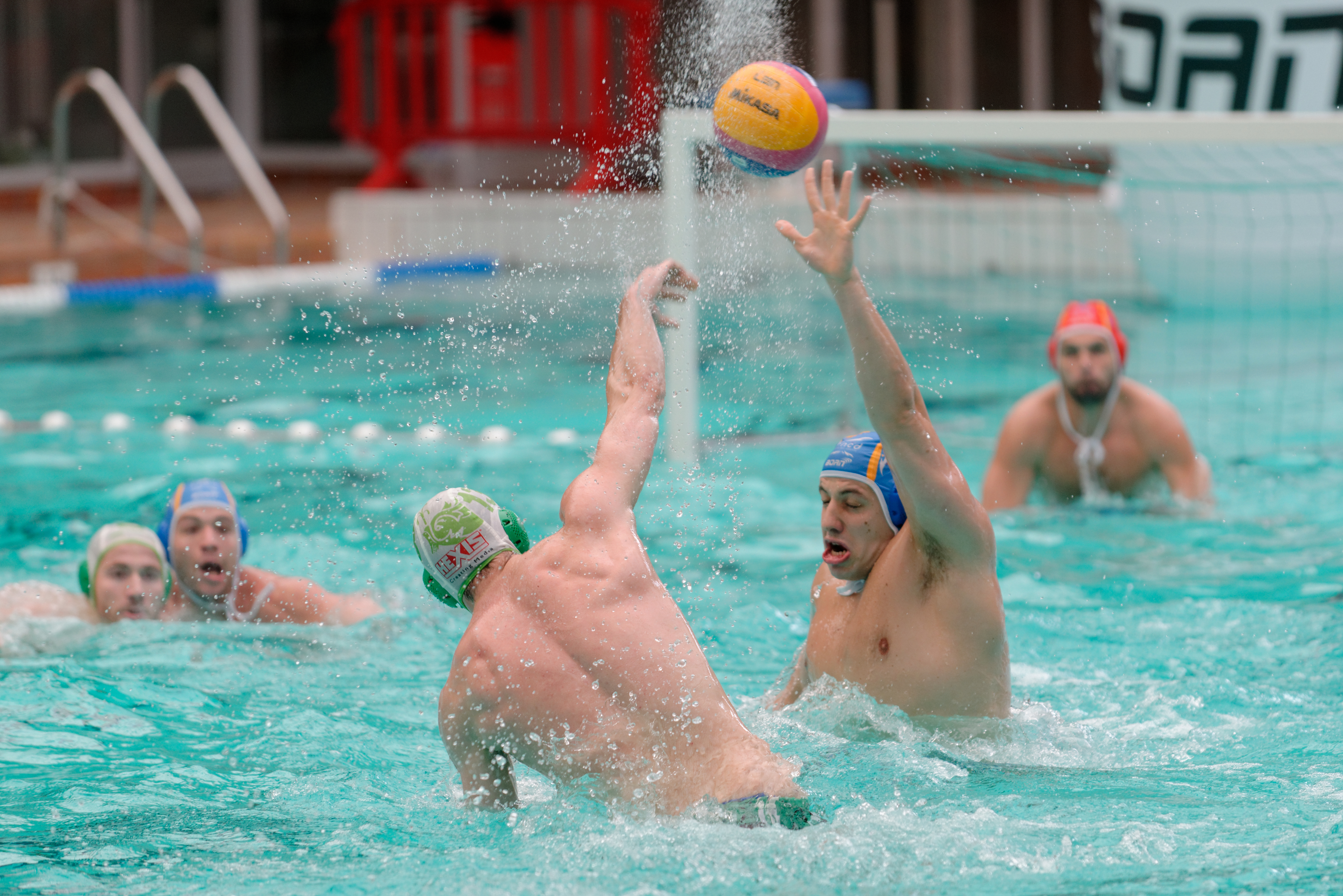
During a water polo match in 2014

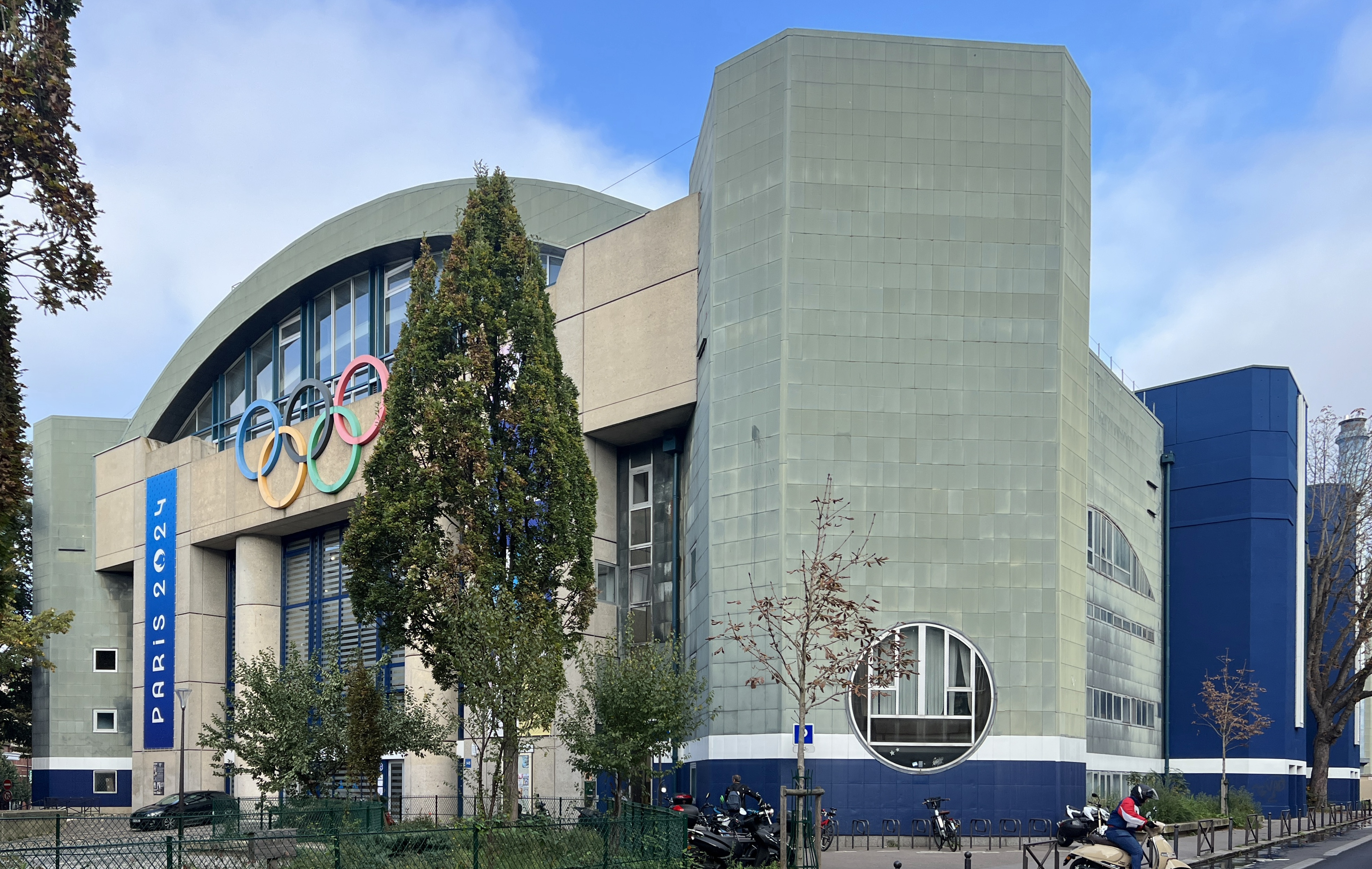
Olympic rings installed on venue in 2024
