= Carl Nilsson (wrestler) =

Swedish wrestler

- Born: 9 May 1897; Skåne, Sweden
- Died: 29 May 1970 (aged 73); Malmö, Sweden

Carl Nilsson (9 May 1897 – 29 May 1970) was a Swedish wrestler. He competed in the freestyle middleweight event at the 1924 Summer Olympics in Paris, France.
