= Johannes van Maaren =

Dutch wrestler

- Born: 4 March 1890; Zaltbommel, Netherlands
- Died: 6 June 1963 (aged 73); Amsterdam, Netherlands

Johannes Lambertus van Maaren (4 March 1890 – 6 June 1963) was a Dutch wrestler. He competed at the 1920, 1924 and 1928 Summer Olympics.
