= František Kratochvíl =

Czech wrestler

- Born: 16 January 1904; Libodřice, Austria-Hungary
- Died: 30 November 1995 (aged 91)

František Kratochvíl (16 January 1904 – 30 November 1995) was a Czech wrestler. He competed at the 1924 and the 1928 Summer Olympics.
