= Alberts Krievs =

Latvian wrestler (1902–1971)

- Born: 10 September 1902
- Died: 19 June 1971 (aged 68)

Alberts Krievs (10 September 1902 – 19 June 1971) was a Latvian wrestler. He competed in the Greco-Roman bantamweight at the 1924 Summer Olympics.
