= John Christoffersen =

Danish wrestler (1898–1966)

- Born: 20 February 1898; Aarhus, Denmark
- Died: 13 September 1966 (aged 68); Aarhus, Denmark

John Christoffersen (20 February 1898 – 13 September 1966) was a Danish wrestler. He competed in the freestyle middleweight and the Greco-Roman middleweight events at the 1924 Summer Olympics.
