= Svend Nielsen (wrestler) =

Danish wrestler (1892–1957)

- Born: 27 September 1892; Aarhus, Denmark
- Died: 15 March 1957 (aged 64); Aarhus, Denmark

Svend Aage Thorvald Michael Nielsen (27 September 1892 – 15 March 1957) was a Danish wrestler. He competed at the 1920 and 1924 Summer Olympics.
