= Kārlis Vilciņš =

Latvian wrestler (1892–1972)

- Born: 1 November 1892; Ogre Municipality, Latvia
- Died: 7 May 1972 (aged 79); Riga, Latvia

Kārlis Vilciņš (1 November 1892 – 7 May 1972) was a Latvian wrestler. He competed in the Greco-Roman middleweight event at the 1924 Summer Olympics.
