= Jan Muijs =

Dutch wrestler

- Born: 21 February 1898; Beverwijk, Netherlands
- Died: 15 May 1968 (aged 70); Beverwijk, Netherlands

Jan Muijs (21 February 1898 – 15 May 1968) was a Dutch wrestler. Muijs competed in Greco-Roman wrestling at the 1924 Summer Olympics. He won a bronze medal at the 1921 World Wrestling Championships.
