= Jan Reinderman =

Dutch wrestler

- Born: 17 April 1886; Amsterdam, Netherlands
- Died: 31 July 1964 (aged 78); Amsterdam, Netherlands

Jan Reinderman (17 April 1886 – 31 July 1964) was a Dutch wrestler. He competed in the Greco-Roman middleweight event at the 1924 Summer Olympics.
