= Kalle Westerlund =

Finnish wrestler (1897–1972)

- Born: 22 September 1897; Helsinki, Finland
- Died: 11 February 1972 (aged 74); Helsinki, Finland

Kalle Westerlund
Medal record

Men's Greco-Roman wrestling

Representing Finland

Olympic Games
Bronze medal – third place	1924 Paris	Lightweight

Kalle Westerlund (22 September 1897 – 11 February 1972) was a Finnish wrestler. He was born in Helsinki, and was the brother of Edvard Westerlund and Emil Westerlund. He won an Olympic bronze medal in Greco-Roman wrestling in 1924. He competed at 1921 World Wrestling Championships, where he placed fourth.
