= Léon Pottier =

Belgian shot putter

Personal information
- Nationality: Belgian
- Born: 8 February 1891 Stavelot
- Died: 6 July 1941 (aged 50) Verviers

Sport
- Sport: Athletics
- Event: Shot put

Léon Nicolas Pottier (8 February 1891 – 6 July 1941) was a Belgian athlete and wrestler. He competed in the men's shot put at the 1920 Summer Olympics and the Greco-Roman heavyweight event at the 1924 Summer Olympics.
