= Viktor Fischer (wrestler) =

Austrian wrestler

Personal information
- Born: 9 October 1892 Graz, Austria
- Died: 1977 (aged 84–85)

Viktor Fischer (9 October 1892 – 1977) was an Austrian wrestler. He competed at the 1912 Summer Olympics and the 1924 Summer Olympics.
