= Edvard Westerlund =

Finnish wrestler (1901–1982)

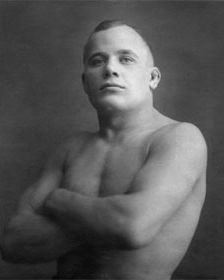

Personal information
- Born: 1 February 1901 Helsinki, Grand Duchy of Finland, Russian Empire
- Died: 7 December 1982 (aged 81) Helsinki, Finland
- Height: 174 cm (5 ft 9 in)
- Weight: 68–87 kg (150–192 lb)

Sport
- Sport: Greco-Roman wrestling
- Club: Helsingin Atleettiklubi, Helsinki
Medal record
Men's Greco-Roman wrestling
Representing Finland
Olympic Games
Gold medal – first place	1924 Paris	75 kg
Bronze medal – third place	1928 Amsterdam	67.5 kg
World Championships
Gold medal – first place	1922 Stockholm	75 kg
Bronze medal – third place	1921 Helsinki	67.5 kg
European championships
Silver medal – second place	1933 Helsinki	79 kg

Edvard Vilhelm "Eetu" Westerlund (1 February 1901 – 7 December 1982) was a Greco-Roman wrestler from Finland. He competed at the 1924, 1928 and 1936 Olympics and won a gold medal in 1924 and a bronze in 1928. He collected the same pair of medals at the world championships in 1921–22. Domestically Westerlund competed both in Greco-Roman and freestyle wrestling and won three titles: in 1927 in Greco-Roman lightweight, in 1929 in freestyle lightweight and in 1936 in Greco-Roman light-heavyweight. His brothers Kalle and Emil were also Olympic wrestlers.
