= Emil Larsen (wrestler) =

Danish wrestler (1888–1942)

- Born: 6 April 1888; Sjælland, Denmark
- Died: 26 June 1942 (aged 54); Copenhagen, Denmark

Emil Marinus Larsen (6 April 1888 – 26 June 1942) was a Danish wrestler. He competed at the 1920, 1924 and the 1928 Summer Olympics. He also won a bronze medal at the 1921 World Wrestling Championships.
