= Jānis Polis (wrestler) =

Latvian wrestler (1893–1953)

- Born: 12 January 1893; Burtnieku novads, Russian Empire
- Died: 29 September 1953 (aged 60); Riga, Latvian SSR, Soviet Union

Jānis Polis (12 January 1893 – 29 September 1953) was a Latvian wrestler. He competed for the Russian Empire at the 1912 Summer Olympics and for Latvia at the 1924 Summer Olympics.
