= Argentina at the 1924 Summer Olympics =

- IOC code: ARG
- NOC: Argentine Olympic Committee

in Paris
- Competitors: 77 in 11 sports
- Flag bearer: Enrique Thompson
- Medals Ranked 16th: Gold 1 Silver 3 Bronze 2 Total 6

Summer Olympics appearances (overview)
- 1900; 1904; 1908; 1912; 1920; 1924; 1928; 1932; 1936; 1948; 1952; 1956; 1960; 1964; 1968; 1972; 1976; 1980; 1984; 1988; 1992; 1996; 2000; 2004; 2008; 2012; 2016; 2020; 2024; 2028

Argentina at the 1924 Summer Olympics in Paris, France was the nation's fourth appearance out of seven editions of the Summer Olympic Games. Argentina sent to the 1924 Summer Olympics its first national team, under the auspices of the Argentine Olympic Committee (Comité Olímpico Argentino), 77 athletes (all males) that competed in 39 events in 11 sports. They brought home Argentina's inaugural batch of Olympic medals, one gold in a team sport, three silver and two bronze; the latter five medals for individual achievement.

== Medalists ==
Medal	Name	Sport	Event	Date
Gold	Argentina national polo team: Arturo Kenny; Juan Miles; Guillermo Naylor; Juan Nelson; Enrique Padilla	Polo		July 12
Silver	Luis Brunetto	Athletics	Men's triple jump	July 12
Silver	Alfredo Copello	Boxing	Men's lightweight	July 20
Silver	Héctor Méndez	Boxing	Men's welterweight	July 20
Bronze	Pedro Quartucci	Boxing	Men's featherweight	July 20
Bronze	Alfredo Porzio	Boxing	Men's heavyweight	July 20

== Aquatics ==
=== Swimming ===
Ranks given are within the heat.

Swimmer	Event	Heats		Semifinals		Final	
Swimmer	Event	Result	Rank	Result	Rank	Result	Rank
Alberto Zorrilla	100 m freestyle	1:08.2	2 Q	1:07.6	6	did not advance	
Alberto Zorrilla	400 m freestyle	5:49.4	4	did not advance			
Juan Behrensen; Tomás Jones; Jorge Moreau; Alberto Zorrilla	4 × 200 m freestyle relay	11:25.0	4	did not advance			

== Athletics ==
Ten athletes represented Argentina in 1924. It was the nation's debut appearance in the sport. Brunetto took a silver medal in the triple jump, and briefly held the Olympic record in the event.

Ranks given are within the heat.

Athlete	Event	Heats		Quarterfinals		Semifinals		Final	
Athlete	Event	Result	Rank	Result	Rank	Result	Rank	Result	Rank
Federico Brewster	400 m	51.8	2 Q	Unknown	6	did not advance			
Luis Brunetto	Triple jump	N/A				15.425 OR	1 Q	15.425	2nd place, silver medalist(s)
Emilio Casanovas	400 m	Unknown	4	did not advance					
Francisco Dova	400 m	51.0	3	did not advance					
Miguel Enrico	100 m	Unknown	6	did not advance					
Félix Escobar	100 m	Unknown	5	did not advance					
Félix Escobar	200 m	23.0	2 Q	Unknown	6	did not advance			
Félix Escobar	400 m	51.4	3	did not advance					
Camilo Rivas	100 m	Unknown	3	did not advance					
Enrique Thompson	400 m hurdles	N/A		57.0	3	did not advance			
Enrique Thompson	Decathlon	N/A						6310.525	13
Otto Diesch; Félix Escobar; Guillermo Newberry; Camilo Rivas	4 × 100 m relay	N/A		44.0	3	did not advance			

== Boxing ==
Ten boxers represented Argentina at the 1924 Games. It was the nation's second appearance in boxing. Argentina won its first medals in the sport, taking four medals total but no championships.

Boxer	Weight class	Round of 32	Round of 16	Quarterfinals	Semifinals	Final / Bronze match	
Boxer	Weight class	Opposition Score	Opposition Score	Opposition Score	Opposition Score	Opposition Score	Rank
Vicente Catada	Flyweight	Bye	Fee (USA); L	did not advance			9
Alfredo Copello	Lightweight	White (GBR); W	Marfut (ITA); W	Rothwell (USA); W	Tholey (FRA); W	Nielsen (DEN); L	2nd place, silver medalist(s)
Manuel Gallardo	Middleweight	Bye	Brousse (FRA); L	did not advance			9
Héctor Méndez	Welterweight	Palm (EST); W	Petersen (DEN); W	Mello (USA); W	Dwyer (IRL); W	Delarge (BEL); L	2nd place, silver medalist(s)
Benjamín Pertuzzo	Bantamweight	Ricciardi (ITA); W	Hilliard (IRL); W	Tripoli (USA); L	did not advance		5
Alfredo Porzio	Heavyweight	N/A	Peguilhan (FRA); W	Greathouse (USA); W	von Porat (NOR); L	de Best (NED); W	3rd place, bronze medalist(s)
Pedro Quartucci	Featherweight	Stuckemann (FRA); W	Beavis (GBR); W	Depont (FRA); W	Fields (USA); L	Devergnies (BEL); W	3rd place, bronze medalist(s)
Mario Reilly	Lightweight	Valdero (ESP); L	did not advance				17
Arturo Rodríguez	Light heavyweight	Petersen (DEN); L	did not advance				17
Alfredo Santoro	Welterweight	Bye	Stauffer (SUI); L	did not advance			9

Opponent nation	Wins	Losses	Percent
Belgium	1	1	.500
Denmark	1	2	.333
Estonia	1	0	1.000
France	4	1	.800
Great Britain	2	0	1.000
Italy	2	0	1.000
Ireland	2	0	1.000
Netherlands	1	0	1.000
Norway	0	1	.000
Spain	0	1	.000
Switzerland	0	1	.000
United States	3	3	.500
Total	17	10	.630

Round	Wins	Losses	Percent
Round of 32	4	2	.667
Round of 16	5	3	.625
Quarterfinals	4	1	.800
Semifinals	2	2	.500
Final	0	2	.000
Bronze match	2	0	1.000
Total	17	10	.630

== Cycling ==
Five cyclists represented Argentina in 1924. It was the nation's debut in the sport.

=== Road cycling ===
Ranks given are within the heat.

Cyclist	Event	Final	
Cyclist	Event	Result	Rank
Luis de Meyer	Time trial	7:14:10.4	31
Julio Polet	Time trial	did not finish	
Cosme Saavedra	Time trial	7:09:16.2	30
José Zampicchiatti	Time trial	7:24:17.0	43
Luis de Meyer; Julio Polet; Cosme Saavedra; José Zampicchiatti	Team time trial	21:47:43.6	9

=== Track cycling ===
Ranks given are within the heat.

Cyclist	Event	First round		First repechage		Quarterfinals		Second repechage		Semifinals		Final	
Cyclist	Event	Result	Rank	Result	Rank	Result	Rank	Result	Rank	Result	Rank	Result	Rank
Luis de Meyer	50 km	N/A										Unknown	8–36
Eugenio Gret	50 km	N/A										Unknown	8–36
Eugenio Gret	Sprint	Unknown	2 r	Unknown	3	did not advance							
Julio Polet	50 km	N/A										Unknown	8–36
Julio Polet	Sprint	Unknown	2 r	Unknown	2	did not advance							
Cosme Saavedra	50 km	N/A										Unknown	8–36

== Fencing ==
Thirteen fencers, all men, represented Argentina in 1924. It was the nation's second appearance in the sport, and first since 1900. Larraz matched the country's best individual fencing result to date, set in 1900, at fifth place.

Men

Ranks given are within the pool.

Fencer	Event	Round 1		Round 2		Quarterfinals		Semifinals		Final	
Fencer	Event	Result	Rank	Result	Rank	Result	Rank	Result	Rank	Result	Rank
Francisco Bollini	Épée	2–7	8	N/A		did not advance					
Horacio Casco	Foil	2–1	2 Q	2–3	4	did not advance					
Horacio Casco	Sabre	N/A				4–2	1 Q	5–3	3 Q	1–6	8
Carlos Guerrico	Foil	0–3	4	did not advance							
Roberto Larraz	Foil	1–2	3 Q	5–0	1 Q	4–1	2 Q	3–2	4 Q	2–4	5
Luis Lucchetti	Épée	4–4	5 Q	N/A		7–3	1 Q	5–6	7	did not advance	
Carmelo Merlo	Sabre	N/A				4–3	4 Q	3–5	6	did not advance	
Pedro Nazar	Épée	6–2	1 Q	N/A		2–7	8	did not advance			
Wenceslao Paunero	Épée	4–4	2 Q	N/A		0–9	10	did not advance			
Arturo Ponce	Sabre	N/A				1–4	5	did not advance			
Raúl Sola	Sabre	N/A				3–3	4 Q	4–4	5	did not advance	
Horacio Casco; Roberto Larraz; Luis Lucchetti; Ángel Santamarina	Team foil	1–0	1 Q	N/A		1–1	2 Q	0–2	3	did not advance	
Luis Lucchetti; Pedro Nazar; Wenceslao Paunero; Cipriano Pons	Team épée	0–2	3	N/A		did not advance					
Horacio Casco; Carmelo Merlo; Arturo Ponce; Raúl Sola; Santiago Torres	Team sabre	1–0	1 Q	N/A		2–0	1 Q	0–2	3	did not advance	

== Polo ==
Argentina sent a polo team to the Olympics for the first time in 1924. In the round-robin tournament, defeated Spain handily in its first game. The second game for Argentina was against the United States, who had already won their other three games and could clinch the gold by beating Argentina. The South Americans were able to come from behind late in the match, however, and defeat the United States. They then beat Great Britain and France to secure the championship.

Ranks given are within the pool.

Players	Event	Round robin				
Players	Event	Wins	Losses	Points for	Points against	Rank
Arturo Kenny; Juan Miles; Guillermo Naylor; Juan Nelson; Enrique Padilla	Men's polo	4	0	46	14	1st place, gold medalist(s)

July 4

Argentina	16–2	Spain

July 6

Argentina	6–5	United States

July 9

Argentina	9–5	Great Britain

July 12

Argentina	15–2	France

== Rowing ==
Nine rowers represented Argentina in 1924. It was the nation's debut in the sport.

Ranks given are within the heat.

Rower	Event	Semifinals		Repechage		Final	
Rower	Event	Result	Rank	Result	Rank	Result	Rank
Julio Alles; Alberto Anderson; Francisco Borgonovo; Federico Lecot; Miguel Madero; David Nolting; Carlos Serantes; Armando Trabucco; Tomás Cerruti	Eight	Unknown	3 r	Unknown	2	did not advance	

== Sailing ==
Five sailors represented Argentina in 1924. It was the nation's debut in the sport.

Sailor	Event	Qualifying				Final			
Sailor	Event	Race 1	Race 2	Race 3	Total	Race 1	Race 2	Total	Rank
Bernardo Milhas	Olympic monotype	5	3	N/A		did not advance			
Rolando Aguirre; César Gérico; Juan Milberg; Bernardo Milhas; Mario Uriburu	8 metre class	4	3	4	11	did not advance			5

== Shooting ==
Eight sport shooters represented Argentina in 1924. It was the nation's debut in the sport.

Shooter	Event	Final	
Shooter	Event	Score	Rank
Lorenzo Amaya	25 m rapid fire pistol	18	4
Carlos Balestrini	25 m rapid fire pistol	15	30
Víctor Bigand	25 m rapid fire pistol	16	21
Antonio Daneri	50 m rifle, prone	382	34
Jorge del Mazo	50 m rifle, prone	382	34
Juan Martino	50 m rifle, prone	389	12
Matías Osinalde	25 m rapid fire pistol	18	5
Abelardo Rico	50 m rifle, prone	389	12

== Tennis ==
Men

Athlete	Event	Round of 128	Round of 64	Round of 32	Round of 16	Quarterfinals	Semifinals	Final	
Athlete	Event	Opposition Score	Opposition Score	Opposition Score	Opposition Score	Opposition Score	Opposition Score	Opposition Score	Rank
Héctor Cattaruzza	Singles	Papadopoulos (GRE); W 7–5, 7–5, 6–1	van Lennep (NED); L 3–6, 1–6, 1–6	did not advance					
Carlos Dumas	Singles	Bye	Aeschlimann (SUI); L 5–7, 4–6, 0–6	did not advance					
Arturo Hortal	Singles	Castro (POR); W 6–1, 6–4, 6–2	Hunter (USA); L 3–6, 3–6, 1–6	did not advance					
Guillermo Robson	Singles	Bye	Bye	Alonso (ESP); L 9–7, 4–6, 0–6, 4–6	did not advance				
Héctor Cattaruzza; Jorge Williams	Doubles	—N/a	Bye	Wennergren / Müller (SWE); L 2–6, 0–6, 3–6	did not advance				
Carlos Dumas; Guillermo Robson	Doubles	—N/a	Bye	Grahn / Schybergson (FIN); W 6–1, 6–3, 6–0	Lacoste / Borotra (FRA); L 4–6, 1–6, 3–6	did not advance			

== Weightlifting ==
Athlete	Event	1H Snatch	1H Clean & Jerk	Press	Snatch	Clean & Jerk	Total	Rank
Carlos Bergara	Men's −82.5 kg	80	85	92.5	97.5	127.5	482.5	5
Alfredo Pianta	Men's −75 kg	62.5	80	75	80	105	402.5	12
Ángel Rovere	Men's −75 kg	62.5	72.5	72.5	85	112.5	405	11
