= Boxing at the 1924 Summer Olympics – Welterweight =

Welterweight boxing at the Games of the VIII Olympiad
- Venue: Vélodrome d'hiver
- Dates: July 15–20, 1924
- Competitors: 29 from 19 nations

Medalists
1st place, gold medalist(s)		Jean Delarge; Belgium
2nd place, silver medalist(s)		Héctor Méndez; Argentina
3rd place, bronze medalist(s)		Douglas Lewis; Canada

The men's welterweight event was part of the boxing programme at the 1924 Summer Olympics. The weight class was the fourth-heaviest contested, and allowed boxers of up to 147 pounds (66.7 kilograms). The competition was held from Tuesday, July 15, 1924, to Sunday, July 20, 1924. 29 boxers from 19 nations competed. Giuseppe Oldani was disqualified in his round of 16 bout against Douglas Lewis by referee T. H. Walker for persistent holding. Oldani's supporters pelted Walker with sticks, coins and walking stick knobs. This went on for nearly an hour, until Walker was escorted from the arena under the protection of several British, American and South African boxers.

== Results ==
Round of 32; July 15
Jean Delarge (BEL)	KO3
Louis Sauthier (SUI)	L
Patrick O'Hanrahan (GBR)	PTS
René Dubois (FRA)	L
Roy Ingram (RSA)	PTS
Joseph Rémy (BEL)	L
Douglas Lewis (CAN)	PTS
Edvard Hultgren (SWE)	L
Giuseppe Oldani (ITA)	PTS
Harald Nielsen (DEN)	L
Hugh Haggerty (USA)	RSC1
Adam Świtek (POL)	L
Patrick Dwyer (IRL)	PTS
James Basham (GBR)	L
Ko Cornelissen (NED)	PTS
Alf Pedersen (NOR)	L
Théodore Stauffer (SUI)	PTS
Alexander Decker (AUT)	L
Héctor Méndez (ARG)	RET2
Valter Palm (EST)	L
Andreas Petersen (DEN)	W
Emmanouil Gneftos (GRE)	DIS3
Al Mello (USA)	PTS
Gaston Doussot (FRA)	L
Edgar Christensen (NOR)	PTS
Giuseppe Colacicco (ITA)	L

Round of 16; July 17
Jean Delarge (BEL)	PTS
Patrick O'Hanrahan (GBR)	L
Roy Ingram (RSA)	PTS
Jan Dam (NED)	L
Douglas Lewis (CAN)	W
Giuseppe Oldani (ITA)	DQ2
Hugh Haggerty (USA)	RSC2
Jan Ertmański (POL)	L
Patrick Dwyer (IRL)	PTS
Ko Cornelissen (NED)	L
Théodore Stauffer (SUI)	PTS
Alfredo Santoro (ARG)	L
Héctor Méndez (ARG)	PTS
Andreas Petersen (DEN)	L
Al Mello (USA)	KO1
Edgar Christensen (NOR)	L

Quarterfinals; July 18
Jean Delarge (BEL)	PTS
Roy Ingram (RSA)	L
Douglas Lewis (CAN)	PTS
Hugh Haggerty (USA)	L
Patrick Dwyer (IRL)	KO3
Théodore Stauffer (SUI)	L
Héctor Méndez (ARG)	W
Al Mello (USA)	DQ2

Semifinals; July 19
Jean Delarge (BEL)	PTS
Douglas Lewis (CAN)	L
Patrick Dwyer (IRL)	L
Héctor Méndez (ARG)	RSC3

Final; July 20
Jean Delarge (BEL)	PTS
Héctor Méndez (ARG)	L
Bronze medal bout
Douglas Lewis (CAN)	W
Patrick Dwyer (IRL)	w/o

== Sources ==
- official report
- Wudarski, Pawel (1999). "Wyniki Igrzysk Olimpijskich" (in Polish).
