= Boxing at the 1924 Summer Olympics – Lightweight =

Boxing competitions

Lightweight boxing at the Games of the VIII Olympiad
- Venue: Vélodrome d'hiver
- Dates: July 16–20, 1924
- Competitors: 30 from 22 nations

Medalists
| 1st place, gold medalist(s) | | Hans Jacob Nielsen; Denmark |
| 2nd place, silver medalist(s) | | Alfredo Copello; Argentina |
| 3rd place, bronze medalist(s) | | Frederick Boylstein; United States |

The men's lightweight event was part of the boxing programme at the 1924 Summer Olympics. The weight class was the fourth-lightest contested, and allowed boxers of up to 135.5 pounds (61.2 kilograms). The competition was held from July 16, 1924 to July 20, 1924. 30 boxers from 22 nations competed.

== Results ==
Round of 32; July 16
Hans Jacob Nielsen (DEN) | PTS
Zorobabel Rodríguez (CHI) | L
Richard Savignac (FRA) | PTS
Ferdinando De Petrillo (ITA) | L
Haakon Hansen (NOR) | PTS
Anton Eichholzer (AUT) | L
Charles Petersen (DEN) | PTS
Grégoire Laurent (LUX) | L
Alfred Genon (BEL) | PTS
Béla Lőwig (HUN) | L
Charles Sinclair (AUS) | PTS
Huub Huizenaar (NED) | L
Arnold Tholey (FRA) | PTS
Charlie Purdy (NZL) | L
Julio César Nicolari (URU) | PTS
Ernests Gutmans (LAT) | L
Dick Beland (RSA) | PTS
Kristoffer Nilsen (NOR) | L
Vicente Valdero (ESP) | PTS
Mario Reilly (ARG) | L
Alfredo Copello (ARG) | PTS
Walter White (GBR) | L
Luigi Marfut (ITA) | PTS
Michel Haddad (EGY) | L
Ben Rothwell (USA) | KO2
John Kelleher (IRL) | L
Chris Graham (CAN) | PTS
Liberto Corney (URU) | L

Round of 16; July 17
Hans Jacob Nielsen (DEN) | PTS
Richard Savignac (FRA) | L
Haakon Hansen (NOR) | PTS
Charles Petersen (DEN) | L
Frederick Boylstein (USA) | PTS
George Shorter (GBR) | L
Alfred Genon (BEL) | PTS
Colin Sinclair (AUS) | L
Arnold Tholey (FRA) | PTS
Julio César Nicolari (URU) | L
Dick Beland (RSA) | PTS
Vicente Valdero (ESP) | L
Alfredo Copello (ARG) | PTS
Luigi Marfut (ITA) | L
Ben Rothwell (USA) | PTS
Chris Graham (CAN) | L

Quarterfinals; July 18
Hans Jacob Nielsen (DEN) | PTS
Haakon Hansen (NOR) | L
Frederick Boylstein (USA) | PTS
Alfred Genon (BEL) | L
Arnold Tholey (FRA) | PTS
Dick Beland (RSA) | L
Alfredo Copello (ARG) | W
Ben Rothwell (USA) | DQ2

Semifinals; July 19
Hans Jacob Nielsen (DEN) | PTS
Frederick Boylstein (USA) | L
Arnold Tholey (FRA) | L
Alfredo Copello (ARG) | PTS

Final; July 20
Hans Jacob Nielsen (DEN) | PTS
Alfredo Copello (ARG) | L
Bronze medal bout
Frederick Boylstein (USA) | PTS
Arnold Tholey (FRA) | L
