= Sauthier =

Sauthier is a surname. Notable people with the surname include:

- Ademar Agostinho Sauthier (born 1940), Brazilian Roman Catholic priest and theologian
- Anthony Sauthier (born 1991), Swiss footballer
- Claude J. Sauthier (1736–1802), French illustrator, draftsman, surveyor and mapmaker
- Jacques Sauthier (1905–?), Swiss boxer
- Louis Sauthier (1902–?), Swiss boxer
