= Bracegirdle =

Bracegirdle is an English surname. People with the name include:

- Anne Bracegirdle (c. 1671 – 1748), English actress
- Frederick Bracegirdle (1885–1948), British sports shooter
- John Bracegirdle (died 1613/1614), English poet
- Lee Bracegirdle (fl. from 1977), Australian-American composer, orchestral horn player and conductor
- Leighton Bracegirdle (1881–1970), Australian naval officer
- Mark Anthony Bracegirdle, Anglo-Australian political activist, known for an incident in Ceylon
- Chicane (musician) (Nicholas Bracegirdle, born 1971)
