= Charles Jardine =

Australian boxer

Charles Jardine (26 February 1889 – 6 October 1942) was an Australian boxer who competed in the 1924 Summer Olympics.

Charles Tennant Jardine was a resident of Inverell, and Moree (N.S.W) districts. A keen sportsman, he was renowned for his champion rifle shooting, shot put, and throwing the hammer, but in the realm of boxing he was an Australian champion.

Training as an amateur boxer, he won the N.S.W Amateur Heavyweight Championship in 1922, and the following year the Australian Heavyweight Championship. In 1924 he was selected to represent Australia at the 1924 Summer Olympics at Paris.

In 1924 he was eliminated in the first round of the heavyweight class after losing to the upcoming gold medalist Otto von Porat.
