= Guerrico =

Guerrico may refer to

- ARA Guerrico, an Argentine Navy corvette
- Rear Admiral Martín Guerrico, an Argentine Navy officer who fought in the 19th century Paraguayan War
- Carlos Guerrico (1889–1958), Argentine Olympic fencer
- Ignacio Guerrico (born 1998), Argentine footballer
- Inés de Guerrico Eguses (Sor María Jacinta; 1793–1840), Argentine nun, writer
