= Delbarre =

Delbarre is a French surname. Notable people with the surname include:

- Catherine Delbarre (1925–2025), French foil fencer
- Charles Delbarre (1886–1961), Belgian sports shooter

== See also ==
- Raoul de Godewaersvelde, born Francis Albert Victor Delbarre (1928–1977), French singer
