= Giuseppe Oldani =

Italian boxer

Giuseppe Oldani (born 15 July 1904, date of death unknown) was an Italian boxer who competed in the 1924 Summer Olympics. He was born in Milan. In 1924 he was eliminated in the second round of the welterweight class after losing his fight to the upcoming bronze medalist Douglas Lewis.
