= Kristoffer Nilsen =

Norwegian boxer (1901–1975)

Kristoffer Nilsen (23 May 1901 – 6 September 1975) was a Norwegian boxer who competed in the 1924 Summer Olympics. He was born and died in Oslo, and represented Kristiania AK. In 1924 he was eliminated in the first round of the lightweight class after losing his fight to Richard Beland.
