= Julio César Nicolari =

Uruguayan boxer

Personal information
- Full name: Julio César Nicolares
- Nationality: Uruguayan
- Born: 9 September 1903 Canelones, Uruguay
- Died: 7 November 1977 (aged 74) Montevideo, Uruguay

Sport
- Sport: Boxing
Medal record
Men's boxing
Representing Uruguay
South American Championships
Gold medal – first place	1924	Lightweight
Gold medal – first place	1925	Lightweight

Julio César "Nicolari" Nicolares (9 September 1903 – 7 November 1977) was a Uruguayan boxer. Born in Canelones, he was selected to be part of the Uruguayan team at the 1924 Summer Olympics for the nation's first appearance at a Games. Competing in the men's lightweight division, became the first Uruguayan boxer to win a bout at the Games though lost his second fight. He was named the 1924 and 1925 South American Champion.

== Biography ==
Julio César "Nicolari" Nicolares was born on 9 September 1903 in Canelones, Uruguay.

For the 1924 Summer Olympics held in Paris, France, Nicolari was selected to be part of the Uruguayan team for their debut appearance. There, he competed in the men's lightweight division against 29 other athletes. He first competed in the first round held on 16 July in the tenth match. He was pitted against Ernests Gūtmanis of Latvia, winning the match by decision. With this, he became the first Uruguayan boxer to win a bout at the Olympic Games. The second round was held the following day, where Nicolari was pitted against Arnold Tholey of France. Nicolari lost the match by decision and placed equal ninth with seven other athletes.

In the same year, Nicolari was named the South American Champion after defeating Francisco Caldera of Chile in the finals. He then won the following year's Championships after defeating his compatriot, Valdenegro. After his amateur career, he transitioned to professional boxing. He later died on 7 November 1977 in Montevideo, Uruguay, at the age of 77.
