= Frederick Roe =

Frederick Roe may refer to:

- Fred Roe (polo), American polo player
- Fred Roe, English painter
- Sir Frederick Adair Roe, 1st Baronet, British barrister and magistrate
