= Georges Galinat =

French boxer

Georges Galinat (22 May 1904 – 14 May 1976) was a French boxer. He competed in the 1924 Summer Olympics. In 1924, Gallant was eliminated in the first round of the heavyweight class after losing his fight to Ed Greathouse of the United States.
