= Daneri =

Daneri is a surname. Notable people with the surname include:

- Alicia Daneri (born 1942), Argentine Egyptologist
- Antonio Daneri (1884–?), Argentine sport shooter
