= Alexander Decker =

Austrian boxer

Alexander Decker (31 October 1904 – 2 March 1990) was an Austrian boxer who competed in the 1924 Summer Olympics. He was eliminated in the first round of the welterweight tournament by losing his fight to Théodore Stauffer.
