= Alf Pedersen =

Norwegian boxer (1904–1925)

Alf Pedersen (20 January 1904 – 3 March 1925) was a Norwegian boxer who competed in the 1924 Summer Olympics. In 1924 he was eliminated in the first round of the welterweight class after losing his fight to Jan Cornelisse. In 1925, Pedersen died of meningitis in Bergen.
