= Shooting at the 1924 Summer Olympics – Men's 50 metre small-bore rifle =

Sports shooting at the Olympics

Men's 50 metre rifle, prone at the Games of the VIII Olympiad
- Venue: Le Stade Olympique Reims
- Date: 23 June 1924
- Competitors: 66 from 19 nations

Medalists
1st place, gold medalist(s)		Pierre Coquelin de Lisle	France
2nd place, silver medalist(s)		Marcus Dinwiddie	United States
3rd place, bronze medalist(s)		Josias Hartmann	Switzerland

The men's 50 metre miniature rifle was a shooting sports event held as part of the Shooting at the 1924 Summer Olympics programme. It was the third appearance of the event. The competition was held on 23 June 1924 at the shooting ranges at Reims. 66 shooters from 19 nations competed.

== Records ==
These were the standing world and Olympic records prior to the 1924 Summer Olympics.

World record	-	none	-	-
Olympic record	391	(United States) Lawrence Nuesslein	Antwerp (BEL)	August 2, 1920

There was no official world record registered.

Pierre Coquelin de Lisle set a new Olympic record with 398 rings.

== Results ==
A maximum of four competitors per nation were allowed.

Place	Shooter	Total
1	Pierre Coquelin de Lisle (FRA)	398
2	Marcus Dinwiddie (USA)	396
3	Josias Hartmann (SUI)	394
4	Erik Sætter-Lassen (DEN)	393
4	Jean Theslöf (FIN)	393
4	Anders Peter Nielsen (DEN)	393
7	Jakob Reich (SUI)	392
7	Viktor Knutsson (SWE)	392
9	Paul Van Asbroeck (BEL)	391
10	Walter Stokes (USA)	390
10	Walter Lienhard (SUI)	390
12	Juan Martino (ARG)	389
12	Abelardo Rico (ARG)	389
12	Arne Nielsen (DEN)	389
12	John Boles (USA)	389
12	John Grier (USA)	389
12	Leon Lagerlöf (SWE)	389
18	Willy Røgeberg (NOR)	388
18	Voitto Kolho (FIN)	388
20	Émile Rumeau (FRA)	387
20	Elemér Takács (HUN)	387
20	Heikki Huttunen (FIN)	387
20	António Martins (POR)	387
24	Lars Jørgen Madsen (DEN)	386
24	Mauritz Eriksson (SWE)	386
26	Arthur Balbaert (BEL)	385
26	Olaf Sletten (NOR)	385
26	August Onsrud (NOR)	385
26	Olle Ericsson (SWE)	385
30	Conrad Adriaenssens (BEL)	384
31	Charles Delbarre (BEL)	383
31	Georges Bordier (FRA)	383
31	Victor Bonafède (MON)	383
34	Jorge del Mazo (ARG)	382
34	Antonio Daneri (ARG)	382
36	Herman Schultz (MON)	381
36	Rudolf Jelen (TCH)	381
38	Antti Valkama (FIN)	380
38	José Macedo (BRA)	380
40	Camillo Isnardi (ITA)	377
41	Ioannis Theofilakis (GRE)	376
41	Ernesto Panza (ITA)	376
41	Willy Schnyder (SUI)	376
41	Josef Sucharda (TCH)	376
45	Roger Abel (MON)	375
45	Olaf Johannessen (NOR)	375
47	Rezső Velez (HUN)	372
47	Antonín Byczanski (TCH)	372
49	David Lewis (GBR)	371
49	Francisco Mendonça (POR)	371
51	Ricardo Ticchi (ITA)	370
52	William Artis (GBR)	369
52	Simion Vartolomeu (ROU)	369
52	Emil Werner (TCH)	369
55	Frederick Bracegirdle (GBR)	367
55	António Ferreira (POR)	367
57	John Clift (GBR)	365
58	Georgios Moraitinis (GRE)	364
59	Joseph Chiaubaut (MON)	361
60	Alexandros Theofilakis (GRE)	358
61	Giuseppe Laveni (ITA)	357
62	Francisco António Real (POR)	355
62	Vasile Ghițescu (ROU)	355
64	Manuel Solis (MEX)	353
65	Constantin Țenescu (ROU)	326
66	Alexandru Vatamanu (ROU)	321
