= Adam Świtek =

Polish boxer

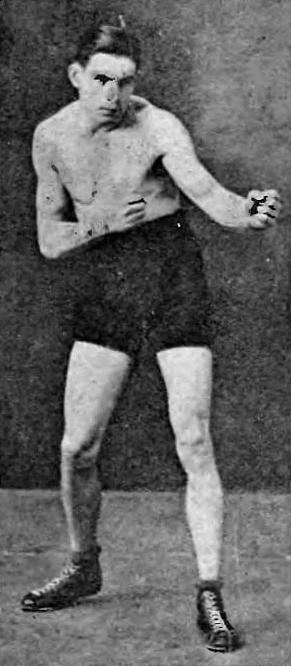
Adam Świtek

Adam Józef Świtek (24 December 1901 – 19 March 1960) was a Polish boxer who competed in the 1924 Summer Olympics. In 1924 he was eliminated in the first round of the welterweight class after losing his bout to Hugh Haggerty of the United States.
