= Edvard Hultgren =

Swedish boxer

Edvard Hultgren (24 January 1904 – 26 April 1984) was a Swedish boxer who competed in the 1924 Summer Olympics. In 1924 he was eliminated in the first round of the welterweight class after losing his fight to the upcoming bronze medalist Douglas Lewis.
