= Joseph Rémy =

Belgian boxer

Joseph Rémy (born 23 September 1906, date of death unknown) is a Belgian boxer who competed in the 1924 Summer Olympics. In 1924 he was eliminated in the first round of the welterweight class after losing to Roy Ingram of South Africa.
