= Jan Dam =

Jan Dam may refer to:

- Jan Dam (footballer) (born 1968), Faroese footballer
- Jan Dam (boxer) (1905–1985), Dutch boxer
