= Huub Huizenaar =

Dutch boxer

Huub Huizenaar boxing in 1932

Hubertus "Huub" Cornelis Marinus Baargarst (pseudonym Huub Huizenaar, 12 January 1909 – 25 October 1985) was a Dutch boxer who competed in the 1924 Summer Olympics. He was born in Rotterdam and died in Eindhoven. In 1924 he was eliminated in the first round of the lightweight class after losing his fight to Charles Sinclair.
