= Riccardo Bertazzolo =

Italian boxer

Riccardo Bertazzolo (4 July 1903 – 5 March 1975) was an Italian boxer who competed in the 1924 Summer Olympics. He was born in Venice. In 1924 he was defeated in the quarterfinals of the heavyweight class by the eventual gold medalist Otto von Porat.
