= Polo at the 1924 Summer Olympics =

Polo at the Olympics

Men's polo at the Games of the VIII Olympiad
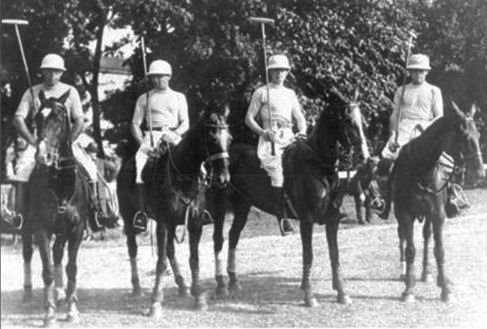
- Argentina polo team, gold medal winner
- Venue: Château de Bagatelle; Saint-Cloud Racecourse
- Dates: 28 June – 12 July 1924
- Competitors: 24 from 5 nations

Medalists
1st place, gold medalist(s)		Argentina
2nd place, silver medalist(s)		United States
3rd place, bronze medalist(s)		Great Britain

A polo tournament was contested at the 1924 Summer Olympics in Paris. The competition ran from 28 June to 12 July at the Château de Bagatelle and the Saint-Cloud Racecourse, with five teams competing. Argentina won the gold medal, beating all four of the other nations in the country's Olympic polo debut. Silver went to the United States, which played in—and won—the first three games of the tournament before a close-played (6–5) loss to Argentina in game 6. Great Britain, the two-time defending champions, finished with bronze.

== Background ==
This was the fourth time that polo was played at the Olympics; the sport had previously appeared in 1900, 1908, and 1920 and would appear again in 1936. Each time, the tournament was for men only.

Argentina and the United States were favored; the two teams were recognized as the top two polo nations in the world but had never faced each other before.

Argentina made its debut in polo in 1924. Great Britain made its fourth appearance; it was the only nation to compete in all five editions of the Olympic polo tournament. The United States made its third appearance, while France and Spain each made their second.

== Competition format ==
For the first time, the polo tournament used a round-robin format. Each nation played each other nation once.

== Results ==
Pos	Team	Pld	W	L	PF	PA	PD	ARG	USA	GBR	ESP	FRA
1	Argentina	4	4	0	46	14	+32		6–5	9–5	16–2	15–2
2	United States	4	3	1	43	11	+32	5–6		10–2	15–2	13–1
3	Great Britain	4	2	2	33	24	+9	5–9	2–10		10–3	16–2
4	Spain	4	1	3	22	42	−20	2–16	2–15	3–10		15–1
5	France	4	0	4	6	59	−53	2–15	1–13	2–16	1–15	

Source: Olympedia

June 28

United States	13–1	France

July 1

United States	15–2	Spain

July 3

United States	10–2	Great Britain

July 4

Argentina	16–2	Spain

July 5

Great Britain	16–2	France

July 6

Argentina	6–5	United States

July 7

Great Britain	10–3	Spain

July 9

Argentina	9–5	Great Britain

July 10

Spain	15–1	France

July 12

Argentina	15–2	France

== Rosters ==
Argentina

- Arturo Kenny
- Juan Miles
- Guillermo Naylor
- Juan Nelson
- Enrique Padilla

France

- Pierre de Chapelle
- Hubert de Monbrison
- Charles de Polignac
- Jules Macaire
- Jean Pastré

Great Britain

- Frederick W. Barrett
- Dennis Bingham
- Fred Guest
- Kinnear Wise

Spain

- Álvaro de Figueroa
- Count of Velayos
- Hernando Fitz-James
- Leopoldo Saínz de la Maza
- Justo San Miguel
- Rafael Fernández, 2nd Duke of Santo Mauro

United States

- Elmer Boeseke
- Tommy Hitchcock, Jr.
- Fred Roe
- Rodman Wanamaker
