= Michel Haddad =

Egyptian boxer

Michel George Haddad (22 February 1902 – 3 May 1983) was an Egyptian boxer who competed in the 1924 Summer Olympics. In 1924 he was eliminated in the first round of the lightweight class after losing his fight to Luigi Marfut.
