= Giuseppe Colacicco =

Italian boxer

Giuseppe Colacicco (4 April 1904 – 28 August 1984) was an Italian boxer who competed in the 1924 Summer Olympics. In 1924 he was eliminated in the first round of the welterweight class after losing his fight to Edgar Christensen.
