= Arturo Kenny =

Argentine polo player

Olympic medal record

Men's polo

Representing Argentina
Gold medal – first place	1924 Paris	Team competition

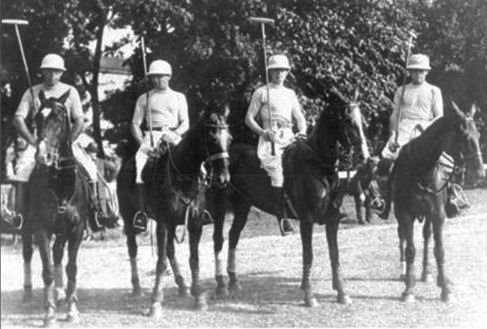
Kenny, Juan Nelson, Enrique Padilla and Juan Miles, 1924

Arturo Juan Kenny y Gahan (born 12 December 1888, date of death unknown) was an Argentine polo player who competed in the 1924 Summer Olympics. He was born in Santa Fe and was of Irish descent. Kenny was part of the Argentine polo team, which won the gold medal.
