= Jan Ertmański =

Polish boxer

Jan Ertmański (5 October 1902 – 10 May 1968) was a Polish boxer who competed in the 1924 Summer Olympics. He was born in Poznań and died in London, Great Britain. In 1924 he was eliminated in the second round of the welterweight class after losing his bout to Hugh Haggerty.
