= Al Mello =

American boxer

Personal information
- Nickname: The Lowell Tiger
- Nationality: American
- Born: Alfons Tavares; January 31, 1906 Lowell, Massachusetts
- Died: October 31, 1993 (aged 87) Tewksbury, Massachusetts
- Height: 5 ft 7 in (1.70 m)
- Weight: Welterweight

Boxing career
- Reach: 67 in (1.70 m)
- Stance: Southpaw, Left-handed

Boxing record
- Total fights: 52
- Wins: 42
- Win by KO: 22
- Losses: 10

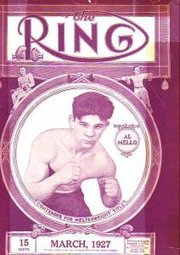
Cover of Ring Magazine 1927

Alfons Mello Tavares (January 31, 1906 – October 31, 1993) was an American Olympic and professional boxer who was a contender for the world middleweight title in 1929-30. He held the New England Welterweight title during his career.

== Early years ==
Tavares was born in Lowell, Massachusetts, on January 16, 1906, of Portuguese heritage. As a youth, he worked in the textile mills, and took up boxing as a teenager, using the name Al Mello.

== Amateur, and professional career ==
After winning the National Amateur Welterweight Championship, as a 5' 7", 148 pound welterweight, he qualified for the 1924 U.S. Olympic Boxing team in Paris. In his first fight, he defeated hometown favorite, Gaston Doussot of France. In the second round, Al Knocked out Norway's Edgar Christensen in the match's first few minutes. Unfortunately, in the quarterfinals, Al was eliminated in a second-round disqualification bout of the Olympic boxing final, losing to Héctor Méndez, of Argentina.

Mello turned professional after the Olympics in 1925, and earned the nickname, "the Stocky Portuguese Battler." Losing only two of his first twenty pro fights, he finished his six-year career record of 42 wins, 10 losses, with 22KOs. He lost only twice to a Technical knockout, but never was counted out for a full knockout.

In April 1926, Al married Mary Veronica Rupa of Lowell. The couple travelled to Atlantic and New York Cites for their honeymoon. He began his training for a bout at Braves Field in June.

=== Taking the USA New England welterweight title ===
Mello took the USA New England welterweight title against Jewish boxer Meyer Cohen at the Arena in Boston in an eighth round knockout on October 3, 1927. Mello's blows were cleaner and sharper, and he led in points throughout the bout. The Boston Globe wrote that Mello had first taken the USA New England title against George "Kid" Lee on July 7, 1926, but he actually lost the official decision.

Of Mello's 10 losses, 4 were disqualifications for low punches. Some of his notable fights include wins over former middle and welterweight champions, Vince and Joe Dundee. He fought George Kid Lee four times, losing 3 of the 4.

On February 27, 1928, Mello lost to highly rated world middleweight contender Ace Hudkins in a fourth round disqualification for punching low at the Arena in Boston. He lost to Hudkins earlier in a ten round points decision on June 1, 1927, in Queens.

Al retired after his final fight with future world middleweight champion Lou Brouillard, which he lost in an eighth round technical knockout at the Boston Garden on May 15, 1931, before 15,000 spectators. Mello had not boxed regularly for two years and took a terrific beating. Brouillard's left hooks connected too often and too powerfully in the eighth, causing Mello's manager to throw in the towel. The bout was for both the New England Middle and Welterweight titles. The Brouillard match was only one of two fights where Al lost due to a technical knock out, the other, just 23 months earlier, was in his second fight with Gorilla Jones.

== Life after boxing ==
Al enlisted in the Army during World War II, and was involved in the Italian Campaign. After retiring, he opened "Al Mello's Restaurant" in his native Lowell. He died in 1993, at age 87, leaving six children and six grandchildren, and was buried in Holy Trinity Cemetery in Lowell.
