= Zorobabel Rodríguez (boxer) =

Chilean boxer

Zorobabel Rodríguez Rodríguez
Personal information
- Nationality: Chilean
- Born: 13 April 1902

Boxing career
- Weight class: Lightweight

Zorobabel Rodríguez Rodríguez (born 13 April 1902, date of death unknown) was a Chilean boxer who competed in the 1924 Summer Olympics. In 1924 he was eliminated in the first round of the lightweight class after losing his fight to the upcoming gold medalist Hans Jacob Nielsen.
