= Richard Savignac =

French boxer

Richard Savignac (22 February 1905 – 30 October 1991) was a French boxer who competed in the 1924 Summer Olympics. In 1924, he was eliminated in the second round of the lightweight class after losing his fight to the upcoming gold medalist, Hans Jacob Nielsen.
