= Liberto =

Origin
- Language: Italian
- Meaning: Freedman
- Region of origin: Italy

Other names
- Variant forms: Di Liberto, Di Liberti, Diliberto, Diliberti, Liberace, Liberaci, Liberato, Liberatori, Liberati, Liberti, Libertini, Libertino, Libertucci

Liberto
- Gender: Male
- Languages: Italian, Spanish, Portuguese

Origin
- Origin: Libertus
- Meaning: Freedman
- Region of origin: Europe (Italy, Spain, and Portugal) and Latin America

Other names
- Variant form: Libero
- Derived: Libertino

Liberto is both a given name and a surname of Italian origin.

== Etymology ==
The term liberto derives from Greek: ἀπελεύθεροι, which means a freed slave. In ancient Greece, those freed slaves had various kinds of obligations toward their former owners and they did not have full citizens rights.

In ancient Rome they were called Latin: libertus, a freedman (feminine: liberta) or an emancipated person who acts for and on behalf of its former master, who became his patron (Latin: patronus). During the Empire period and after the judgment of a magistrate they were freed from a Latin: iusta servitus. Despite being freed by manumission and acquiring the Roman citizenship and a legal personality, they did not have the same legal rights of the free-born and were excluded from the main offices, maintaining a subordinate position and many obligations on behalf of their former masters, which can be summarized in three duties: Latin: obsequium (obedience; respecting the patron as a father), Latin: operae (work), and Latin: bona (honesty; masters maintain the right of inheritance). This status could be revoked by Latin: revocatio in servitutem propter ingratitudinem. During the late imperial period a liberto can achieve the full status of naive by Latin: natalium restitution.

However, the name Liberto has also been traced to an unrelated Germanic given name.

== Notable people ==
- Giuseppe Liberto (born 1943), Italian priest, choral director and composer
- Liberto Beltrán (born 1996), Spanish footballer
- Liberto Corney (1905–1955), Uruguayan boxer
- Vivian Cash (born Vivian Liberto; 1934–2005), American homemaker and author

== See also ==
- Roman law
- Slavery in ancient Greece
- Slavery in ancient Rome
