= Anton Eichholzer =

Austrian boxer

Anton "Toni" Eichholzer (14 March 1903 – 19 March 1961) was an Austrian boxer who competed in the 1924 Summer Olympics. In 1924 he was eliminated in the first round of the lightweight class after losing his fight to Haakon Hansen.
