= Tormod Normann =

- Born: 10 March 1905; Kristiania, Norway
- Died: 1974 (aged 68–69)
- Occupations: Lawyer and sports administrator

Tormod Normann (10 March 1905 – 1974) was a Norwegian lawyer, competitive swimmer and sports administrator, who served as secretary general for the Norwegian Confederation of Sports for more than twenty years.

== Personal life ==
Normann was born in Kristiania to Johan Kristian Olsen and Theodora Olsen, and married Olga Fredrikke Andersen in 1927. He graduated as cand.jur. in 1946.

== Career ==
Representing Oslo Atletklub and SK Speed, Normann was Norwegian champion in 200 metres breaststroke twelve times between 1923 and 1938, and Nordic champion in 1933 and 1935. He served as secretary general for the Norwegian Confederation of Sports from 1945 to 1968. His published works include Norges deltakelse i De Olympiske Leker (1948, 1952, 1956, 1960 and 1964). He edited the sports magazine Norsk idrett in 1958, and he was a regular contributor to the magazine Svensk idrett from 1957 to 1968.
