= Oslo AK =

Norwegian sports club

Oslo Atletklub is a Norwegian sports club from Oslo. It now only has a section for weightlifting.

The club was founded as Kristiania Atletklub on 4 October 1916.

Their best athlete was Otto von Porat who became an Olympic gold medalist in amateur boxing in 1924. Haakon Hansen and Kristoffer Nilsen also competed at the 1924 Olympics, and Ingvald Bjerke competed at the 1928 Olympics. Arthur Nord represented the club in sport wrestling in 1924 and 1928. The club also competed in swimming, where Tormod Normann was the club's best achiever. Boxing, wrestling and swimming were later discontinued.
