= Colin Sinclair (boxer) =

Australian boxer (1830–1970)

Charles Colin Sinclair (15 June 1890 – 30 August 1970) was an Australian boxer who competed in the 1924 Summer Olympics. In 1924 he was eliminated in the second round of the lightweight class after losing his fight to Alfred Genon.
