= David Lewis (sport shooter) =

British sports shooter

Personal information
- Full name: David E. Lewis
- Born: 7 June 1879
- Died: 17 October 1966 (aged 87)

Sport
- Sport: Sports shooting

David Lewis (7 June 1879 – 17 October 1966) was a British sports shooter. He competed in the 50 m rifle event at the 1924 Summer Olympics.
