= John Clift =

British sports shooter (1877–1953)

Personal information
- Born: 23 June 1877; Wandsworth, London, England
- Died: 14 May 1953 (aged 75); Cheltenham, Gloucestershire, England

Sport
- Sport: Sports shooting

Major John George Neilson Clift OBE (23 June 1877 – 14 May 1953) was a British sports shooter and archaeologist. He competed in the 50 m rifle event at the 1924 Summer Olympics.

From 1907 to 1914, he was joint honorary secretary of the British Archaeological Association. He also served in the Royal Engineers and the Royal Air Force in the First World War. He was appointed a Member of the Order of the British Empire in the 1919 New Year Honours. He was later awarded the OBE. He died in Cheltenham.
