= Arthur Clifton (boxer) =

British boxer

Personal information
- Nationality: British
- Born: 20 August 1897; Lambeth, London, England
- Died: 2nd quarter 1975 (aged 77); Redbridge, London, England

Sport
- Sport: Boxing

Arthur John Clifton (20 August 1897 – 1975) was a British boxer. He competed in the men's heavyweight event at the 1924 Summer Olympics.

Clifton won the Amateur Boxing Association 1924 heavyweight title, when boxing out of the PLA Police ABC.
