= Marcus Dinwiddie =

American sport shooter (1906–1951)

Personal information
- Born: August 27, 1906 Washington, D. C., United States
- Died: March 20, 1951 (aged 44) Oak Ridge, Tennessee, United States

Sport
- Sport: Sports shooting
Medal record
Men's shooting
Representing United States
Olympic Games
Silver medal – second place	1924 Paris	50 m rifle, Standing

Marcus William Dinwiddie (August 27, 1906 – March 20, 1951) was an American sport shooter who competed in the 1924 Summer Olympics. In 1924 he won the silver medal 50 metre rifle, standing in the team free rifle competition. He was born in Washington, D.C., and died in Oak Ridge, Tennessee.
