= James Basham =

British boxer

Personal information
- Full name: James George Basham
- Nationality: British
- Born: 12 May 1903; Shoreditch
- Died: 1977; Warwick

Sport
- Sport: Boxing

James George Basham (12 May 1903 – 1977) was a British boxer. He competed in the men's welterweight event at the 1924 Summer Olympics.
