= Tomasz Konarzewski =

Polish boxer

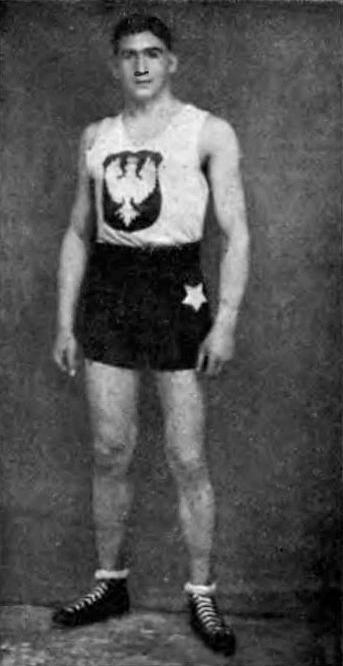
Tomasz Konarzewski

Tomasz Konarzewski (17 July 1904 – 20 February 1974) was a Polish boxer who competed in the 1924 Summer Olympics. He was born in Sieradz and died in Łódź. In 1924 he was eliminated in the first round of the heavyweight class after losing his bout to Robert Larsen.
