= Gaston Doussot =

French boxer

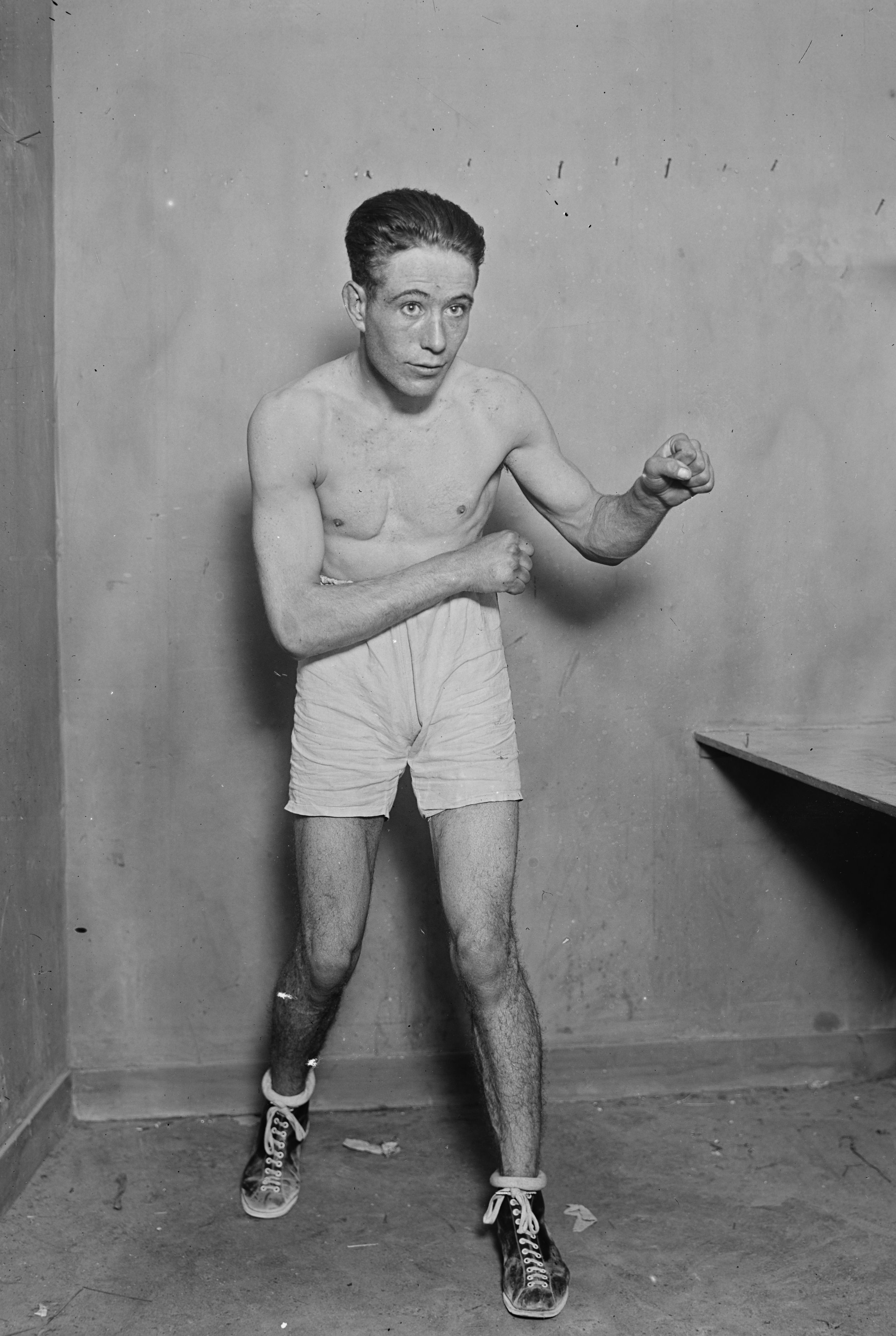
Georges Doussot 1924

Gaston Doussot (9 February 1901 – 28 April 1965) was a French boxer. He competed in the 1924 Summer Olympics. In 1924, Doussot was eliminated in the first round of the welterweight class after losing his fight to Al Mello.
