= William Artis (sport shooter) =

British sports shooter

Personal information
- Born: 3 October 1884 Wangford, Suffolk, England
- Died: 23 June 1957 (aged 72) Southwold, Surrey, England

Sport
- Sport: Sports shooting

William John Artis MC (3 October 1884 – 23 June 1957) was a British sports shooter. He competed in the 50 m rifle event at the 1924 Summer Olympics.

Artis farmed on his family farm in Suffolk before and after World War I, during which he served in the Machine Gun Corps and won the Military Cross in 1918. After the war and into the 1930s he served in the Territorial Army with the Suffolk Yeomanry, rising to the rank of Major.
