= Emmanouil Gneftos =

Greek boxer and rower

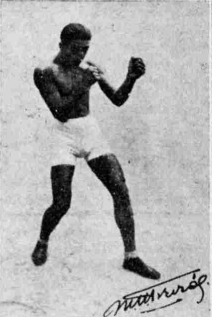

Personal information
- Native name: Εμμανουήλ Γνευτός
- Nationality: Greek
- Born: 1904
- Died: Unknown

Sport
- Sport: Boxing

Emmanouil "Manolis" Gneftos (Εμμανουήλ "Μανώλης" Γνευτός); born 1904, date of death unknown), also written as Emmanouil Gneytos, was a Greek-Egyptian boxer and rower. He represented Greece in boxing at the 1924 Summer Olympics in Paris.

== Athletic career ==
Gneftos was the first Greek boxer to compete at the Olympic Games. At the 1924 Summer Olympics, he competed in the men's welterweight event. He was eliminated in his first bout, losing to Andreas Petersen of Denmark on 15 July 1924.

He was later described as having been a champion of Egypt and Greece for 15 years. In 1950, he was living in Alexandria and serving as general director of the Patriarchal Labour Office. He also served as a boxing judge.

Gneftos was also a rower with the Hellenic Naval Club of Alexandria. He was a rowing champion in Egypt and placed second at the Pan-Egyptian Games.
