= Jan Dam (boxer) =

Dutch boxer

Johannes "Jan" Dam (24 November 1905 – 19 December 1985) was a Dutch boxer who competed in the 1924 Summer Olympics. He was born and died in Rotterdam. In 1924 he was eliminated in the second round of the welterweight class after losing his fight to Roy Ingram.
