= Georges Bordier =

French sports shooter

Personal information
- Born: 7 April 1880
- Died: 9 October 1948 (aged 68)

Sport
- Sport: Sports shooting

Georges Bordier (7 April 1880 – 9 October 1948) was a French sports shooter. He competed in the 50 m rifle event at the 1924 Summer Olympics.
