= John Grier =

American sports shooter

Personal information
- Born: February 6, 1901
- Died: June 30, 1991 (aged 90) Wilmington, Delaware, United States

Sport
- Sport: Sports shooting

John B. "Cap" Grier (February 6, 1901 – June 30, 1991) was an American sports shooter. He competed in the 50 m rifle event at the 1924 Summer Olympics.

Grier was inducted into the Delaware Sports Museum and Hall of Fame in 1979.
