= Carlo Scotti =

Italian boxer

Carlo Scotti (11 May 1904 – 1 August 1961) was an Italian boxer who competed in the 1924 Summer Olympics. In 1924 he was eliminated in the first round of the heavyweight class after losing his fight to the upcoming silver medalist Søren Petersen.
