= Ben Rothwell (boxer) =

American boxer

Benjamin "Ben" Rothwell, Jr. (September 14, 1902 – December 14, 1979) was an American boxer who competed in the 1924 Summer Olympics. He was born in West Point, Virginia and died in Short Hills, New Jersey. In 1924 he was eliminated in the quarter-finals of the lightweight class after losing his fight to the eventual silver medalist Alfredo Copello of Argentina.

== Professional boxing record ==
6 fights	6 wins	0 losses
By knockout	5	0
By decision	1	0

No.	Result	Record	Opponent	Type	Round, time	Date	Location	Notes
6	Win	6–0	(United States) Joey Ryan	PTS	6	Mar 23, 1925	(United States) Philadelphia, Pennsylvania, U.S.	
5	Win	5–0	(United States) Jackie Adnit	KO	3 (?)	Feb 28, 1925	(United States) Ridgewood Grove SC, Brooklyn, New York, U.S.	
4	Win	4–0	(Sweden) Ernie Lind	TKO	2 (6)	Dec 3, 1924	(United States) 1st Regiment Armory, Newark, New Jersey, U.S.	
3	Win	3–0	(United States) George Brandt	KO	1 (8)	Nov 24, 1924	(United States) Laurel Garden, Newark, New Jersey, U.S.	
2	Win	2–0	(United States) Hal Simmons	KO	2 (6)	Nov 11, 1924	(United States) Laurel Garden, Newark, New Jersey, U.S.	
1	Win	1–0	(United States) Joe Carlo	TKO	2 (6)	Nov 3, 1924	(United States) Laurel Garden, Newark, New Jersey, U.S.	
