= Béla Lőwig =

Hungarian boxer

Personal information
- Nationality: Hungarian
- Born: 7 July 1902
- Died: 1982 (aged 79–80)

Sport
- Sport: Boxing

Béla Lőwig (7 July 1902 – 1982) was a Hungarian boxer. He competed in the men's lightweight event at the 1924 Summer Olympics. He also took part in the 1924 and 1925 Europa Championships. In 1927, he was banned from boxing for six months due to violations against officers of the Hungarian Boxing Association, and he did not return to the sport when his ban was lifted.

Lőwig also worked as a bodyguard for the Hungarian fascist leader Ferenc Szálasi. In 1946, he was sentenced to three years in prison.
