= Alfredo Santoro =

Argentine boxer

Alfredo Santoro (born 6 November 1906, date of death unknown) was an Argentine boxer who competed in the 1924 Summer Olympics. In 1924, he was eliminated in the second round of the welterweight class after losing his fight to Théodore Stauffer.
