= Boxing at the 1924 Summer Olympics – Heavyweight =

Boxing competitions

Heavyweight boxing at the Games of the VIII Olympiad
- Venue: Vélodrome d'hiver
- Dates: July 16–20, 1924
- Competitors: 15 from 11 nations

Medalists
1st place, gold medalist(s)		Otto von Porat; Norway
2nd place, silver medalist(s)		Søren Petersen; Denmark
3rd place, bronze medalist(s)		Alfredo Porzio; Argentina

The men's heavyweight event was part of the boxing programme at the 1924 Summer Olympics. The weight class was the heaviest contested, allowing boxers weighing over 175 pounds (79.4 kilograms). The competition was held from Wednesday, July 16, 1924, to Sunday, July 20, 1924. Fifteen boxers from eleven nations competed.

== Results ==
Round of 16; July 16
Otto von Porat (NOR)	RSC2
Charles Jardine (AUS)	L
Riccardo Bertazzolo (ITA)	PTS
Cornelis O'Kelly (GBR)	L
Alfredo Porzio (ARG)	PTS
Charles Peguilhan (FRA)	L
Ed Greathouse (USA)	PTS
Georges Galinat (FRA)	L
Henk de Best (NED)	-
Bye	-
Robert Larsen (DEN)	W
Tomasz Konarzewski (POL)	DIS2
Søren Petersen (DEN)	PTS
Carlo Scotti (ITA)	L
Arthur Clifton (GBR)	PTS
Eddie Eagan (USA)	L

Quarterfinals; July 18
von Porat (NOR)	KO3
Bertazzolo (ITA)	L
Porzio (ARG)	PTS
Greathouse (USA)	L
de Best (NED)	PTS
Larsen (DEN)	L
Petersen (DEN)	W
Clifton (GBR)	w/o

Semifinals; July 19
von Porat (NOR)	PTS
Porzio (ARG)	L
de Best (NED)	L
Petersen (DEN)	PTS

Final; July 20
von Porat (NOR)	PTS
Petersen (DEN)	L
Bronze medal bout
Porzio (ARG)	PTS
de Best (NED)	L

== Sources ==
- Wudarski, Pawel (1999). "Wyniki Igrzysk Olimpijskich" (in Polish).
