= Pierre Coquelin de Lisle =

French sport shooter

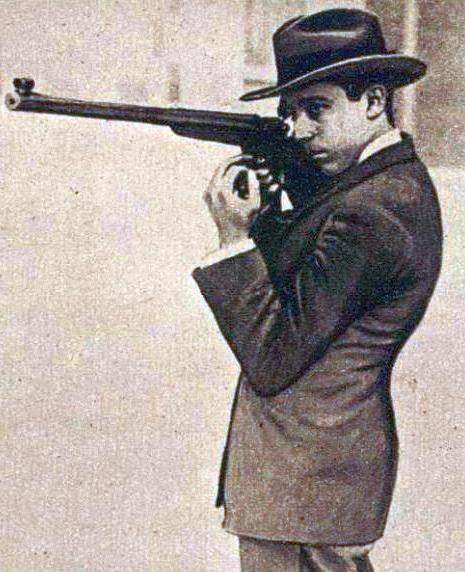

Personal information
- Born: 19 July 1900 Lille, France
- Died: 22 July 1980 (aged 80) Ivry-sur-Seine, France

Sport
- Sport: Sports shooting
Medal record
Men's shooting
Representing France
Olympic Games
Gold medal – first place	1924 Paris	50 m rifle, prone

Pierre Coquelin de Lisle (19 July 1900 – 22 July 1980) was a French sport shooter who competed in the 1924 Summer Olympics. In 1924 he won the gold medal in the 50 metre rifle, prone competition.
