= Joseph Chiaubaut =

Monegasque sports shooter (1880–1969)

Personal information
- Born: 26 August 1880
- Died: 23 December 1969 (aged 89)

Sport
- Sport: Sports shooting

Joseph Chiaubaut (26 August 1880 – 23 December 1969) was a Monegasque sports shooter. He competed in the 50 m rifle event at the 1924 Summer Olympics.
