= Henk de Best =

Dutch boxer

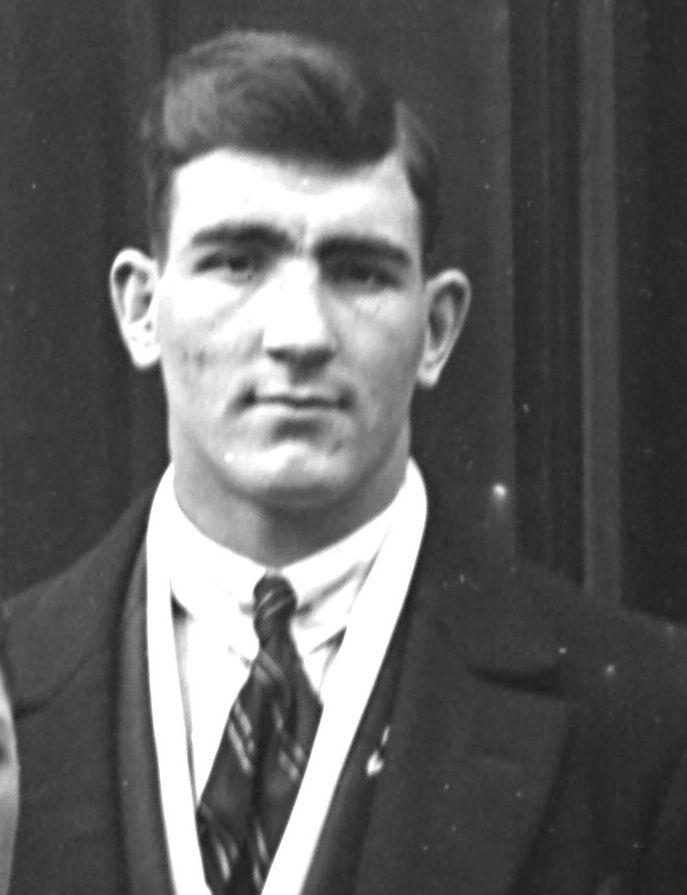
Henk de Best in 1924

Hendrik "Henk" de Best (1 May 1905, in Amsterdam – 6 July 1978, in Amsterdam) was a Dutch boxer who competed in the 1924 Summer Olympics. In 1924 he finished fourth in the heavyweight class after losing the bronze medal bout to Alfredo Porzio.
