= Justo San Miguel =

Spanish polo player

Personal information
- Born: 5 July 1870; Granada, Spain
- Died: 2 June 1947 (aged 76); Madrid, Spain

Sport
- Sport: Polo

Justo San Miguel (5 July 1870 – 2 June 1947) was a Spanish polo player. He competed in the polo tournament at the 1924 Summer Olympics.
