= Ernesto Panza =

Italian sports shooter

Personal information
- Born: 23 May 1878 Milan, Italy
- Died: 27 April 1949 (aged 70)

Sport
- Sport: Sports shooting

Ernesto Panza (23 May 1878 – 27 April 1949) was an Italian sports shooter. He competed in the 50 m rifle event at the 1924 Summer Olympics.
