= Alfred Genon =

Belgian boxer

Alfred "Alf" Dieudonné Genon (30 November 1903 – 25 October 1974) was a Belgian boxer who competed in the 1924 Summer Olympics. He was born in Herstal. In 1924 he was eliminated in the quarterfinals of the lightweight class after losing to the upcoming bronze medalist Frederick Boylstein.
