= John Kelleher (boxer) =

Irish boxer

Personal information
- Nationality: Irish
- Born: 12 November 1901
- Died: 23 December 1972 (aged 71)

Sport
- Sport: Boxing

John Kelleher (12 November 1901 – 23 December 1972) was an Irish boxer. He competed in the men's lightweight event at the 1924 Summer Olympics.
