= Grégoire Laurent =

Luxembourgish boxer

Grégoire "Gusty" Laurent (4 March 1906 in Le Sablon, France – 22 March 1985) was a Luxembourgish boxer who competed in the 1924 Summer Olympics. In 1924 he was eliminated in the first round of the lightweight class after losing his fight to Charles Petersen.
