= Louis Sauthier =

Swiss boxer

Personal information
- Nationality: Swiss
- Born: 1902

Sport
- Sport: Boxing

Louis Sauthier (born 1902, date of death unknown) was a Swiss boxer. He competed in the men's welterweight event at the 1924 Summer Olympics. At the 1924 Summer Olympics, he lost to Jean Delarge of Belgium.
