= Mario Reilly =

Argentine boxer

Mario Reilly (born 15 May 1905, date of death unknown) was an Argentine boxer who competed in the 1924 Summer Olympics. In 1924 he was eliminated in the first round of the lightweight class after losing his fight to Vicente Valdero.
