= Arne Nielsen =

Danish sports shooter (1895–1942)

Personal information
- Born: 1 October 1895 Aarhus, Denmark
- Died: 20 June 1942 (aged 46) Copenhagen, Denmark

Sport
- Sport: Sports shooting

Arne Nielsen (1 October 1895 – 20 June 1942) was a Danish sports shooter. He competed in the 50 m rifle event at the 1924 Summer Olympics.
