= Ernests Gūtmanis =

Latvian boxer

Ernests Gūtmanis (born 15 January 1901, date of death unknown) was a Latvian boxer who competed in the 1924 Summer Olympics. In 1924 he was eliminated in the first round of the lightweight class after losing his fight to Jorge Nicolares.
