= Charles Peguilhan =

French boxer

Charles Peguilhan (18 September 1906 – 14 December 1926) was a French boxer who competed in the 1924 Summer Olympics. He died in Hartford, Connecticut. In 1924 he was eliminated in the first round of the heavyweight class after losing to the upcoming bronze medalist Alfredo Porzio.

He died one day after his first professional fight in the United States as a result of injuries after he was knocked out by Al Friedman.
