= Ed Greathouse =

American boxer

Elery "Ed" Guy Greathouse (October 26, 1899 – 1956) was an American boxer who competed in the 1924 Summer Olympics in Paris. He was born in Roane County, West Virginia. At the 1924 Olympic tournament Greathouse was eliminated in the second round of the heavyweight class after losing his fight to the eventual bronze medalist Alfredo Porzio of Argentina.
