= Guillermo Naylor =

Argentine polo player (1884–1976)

Olympic medal record

Men's polo
Gold medal – first place	1924 Paris	Team competition

Guillermo Brookes Naylor (born William Brookes Naylor Adie; 4 September 1884 – 23 January 1976) was an Argentine polo player who competed in the 1924 Summer Olympics. In 1924 he was part of the Argentine polo team, which won the gold medal. He was of British descent.
