= Roy Ingram =

South African boxer (1900–1972)

Reginald William Thomas "Roy" Ingram (19 November 1900 – 1972) was a South African boxer who competed in the 1920 Summer Olympics and in the 1924 Summer Olympics. He was born in Belfast, United Kingdom of Great Britain and Ireland

In 1920, he was eliminated in the second round of the welterweight class after losing his fight to Trygve Stokstad. Four years later, he was eliminated in the quarter-finals of the welterweight class after losing his fight to the eventual gold medalist Jean Delarge.
