= Fred Roe (polo) =

American polo player

Personal information
- Born: January 18, 1889 Robert Lee, Texas, United States
- Died: May 6, 1968 (aged 79) Robert Lee, Texas, United States

Sport
- Sport: Polo

Fred Roe (January 18, 1889 – May 6, 1968) was an American polo player, horse breeder, and banker.

He grew up on his parents' 6-square-mile ranch in rural Coke County, Texas, and assisted his father in its operations at a very early age. He was interested in training saddle horses, especially polo ponies. He became interested in polo as a young man, competing locally first in nearby San Angelo, and later nationwide and even internationally. He became famous as one of the most skilled polo players in America.

Roe competed in the polo tournament at the 1924 Summer Olympics, winning a silver medal.

In August 1927, he was critically injured during a match on Long Island. He was unable to play at an elite level after his accident, but he continued to be active in the game as a horse breeder and trainer.

Roe graduated from Yale College and Harvard Business School.
