= Camilo Rivas =

Argentine sprinter

Personal information
- Nationality: Argentine
- Born: 1898

Sport
- Sport: Track and field
- Events: 100m, 4x100m

Carlos "Camilo" Rivas (born 1898, date of death unknown) was an Argentine track and field athlete. Rivas competed in the men's 100 metres hurdles and the men's 4 x 100 metres relay at the 1924 Summer Olympics.
