= Charles Delbarre =

Belgian sports shooter

Personal information
- Born: 20 April 1886
- Died: 14 November 1961 (aged 75)

Sport
- Sport: Sports shooting

Charles Delbarre (20 April 1886 – 14 November 1961) was a Belgian sports shooter. He competed in the 50 m rifle event at the 1924 Summer Olympics.
