= Carlos Balestrini =

Argentine sports shooter

Personal information
- Born: 8 March 1880 Córdoba, Argentina
- Died: 22 April 1972 (aged 92)

Sport
- Sport: Sports shooting

Carlos Balestrini (8 March 1880 – 22 April 1972) was an Argentine sports shooter. He competed at the 1924 Summer Olympics and the 1936 Summer Olympics.
