= Raúl Sola =

Argentine fencer

Personal information
- Born: 1898

Sport
- Sport: Fencing

Raúl Sola (born 1898, date of death unknown) was an Argentine fencer. He competed in the individual and team sabre competitions at the 1924 Summer Olympics.
