= Patrick Dwyer (boxer) =

Irish boxer

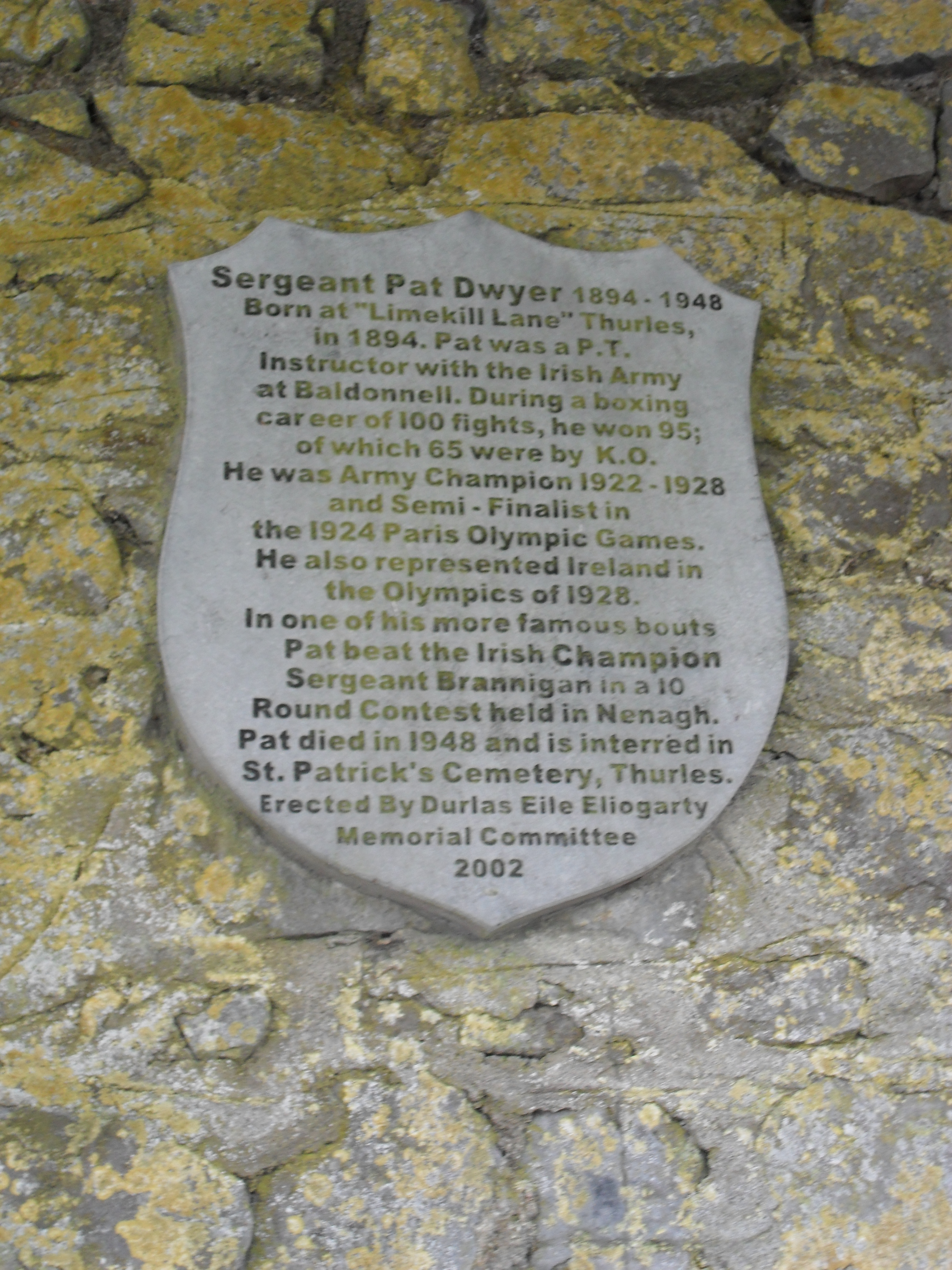
- Plaque in Thurles commemorating Dwyer. It claims he "represented Ireland" at the 1928 Olympics; he did not fight but was present as a coach.

Personal information
- Nickname: Rocky
- Nationality: Irish Free State
- Born: 31 March 1894 Thurles, County Tipperary, Ireland
- Died: 9 August 1948 (aged 54) Thurles, County Tipperary, Ireland
- Weight: welterweight (135–147 lb; 61.2–66.7 kg)

Boxing career
- Stance: Orthodox

Boxing record
- Total fights: 100
- Wins: 95
- Win by KO: 65
- Losses: 5

Patrick "Pat" Dwyer (31 March 1894 – 9 August 1948) was an Irish boxer. He competed in the men's welterweight event at the 1924 Summer Olympics. He lived most of his life in Thurles and worked as a Garda Síochána (policeman).
