= Frederick Bracegirdle =

British sports shooter

Personal information
- Born: 24 June 1885 Derby, England
- Died: 5 August 1948 (aged 63) Derby, England

Sport
- Sport: Sports shooting

Frederick Bracegirdle (24 June 1885 – 5 August 1948) was a British sports shooter. He competed in the 50 m rifle event at the 1924 Summer Olympics.
