= Luis de Meyer =

Argentine cyclist

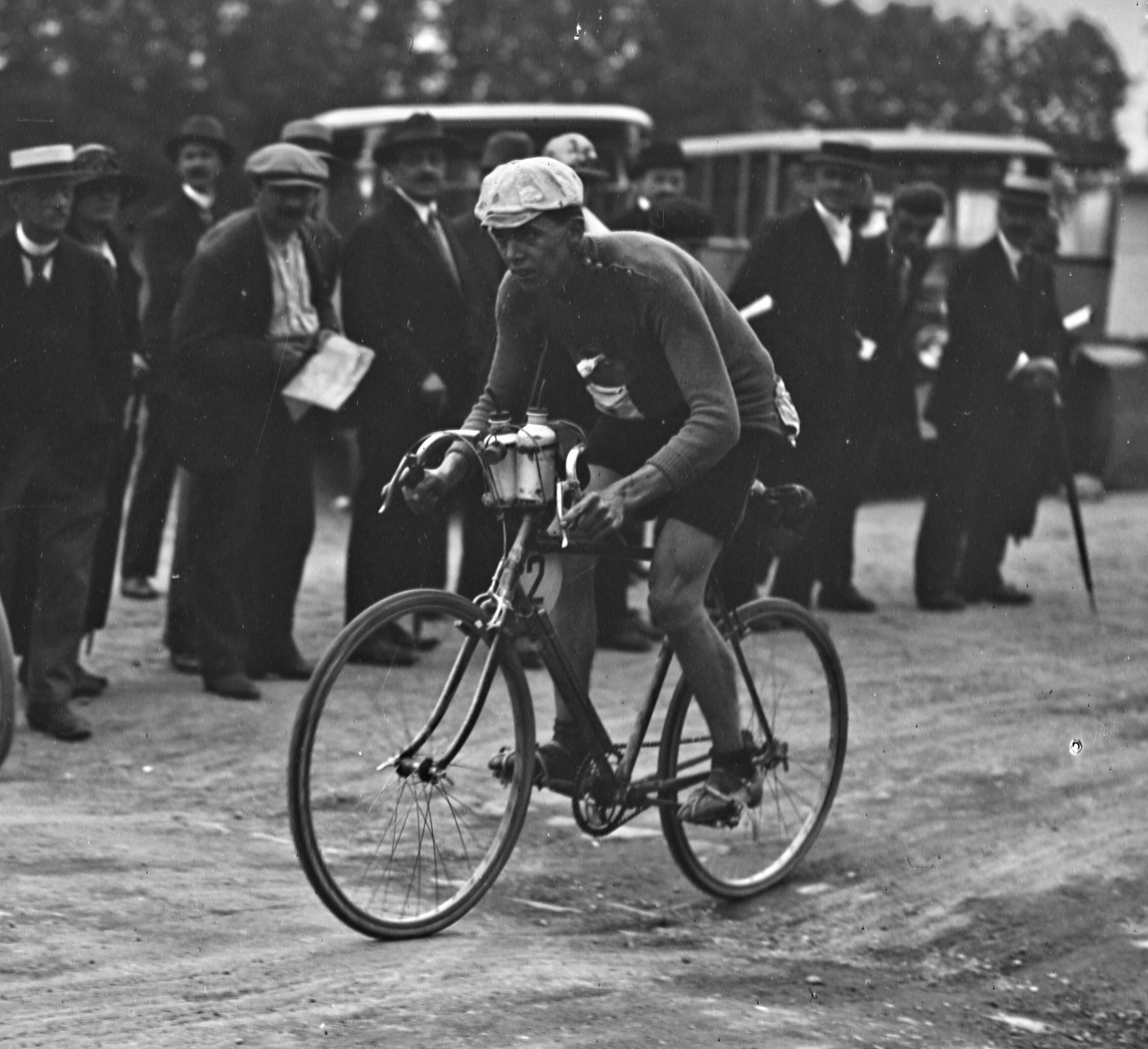
- de Meyer at the 1924 Summer Olympics

Personal information
- Born: 1903

Cycling career
- Sport: Cycling

Luis de Meyer (born 1903, date of death unknown) was an Argentine cyclist. He competed in three events at the 1924 Summer Olympics and two events at the 1928 Summer Olympics.
