= Arnold Tholey =

French boxer

Arnold Tholey (12 July 1903 – 22 January 1988) was a French boxer. He competed in the 1924 Summer Olympics. In 1924, Tholey finished fourth in the lightweight class after losing the bronze medal bout to Frederick Boylstein.
