= Julio Polet =

Argentine cyclist (1898–?)

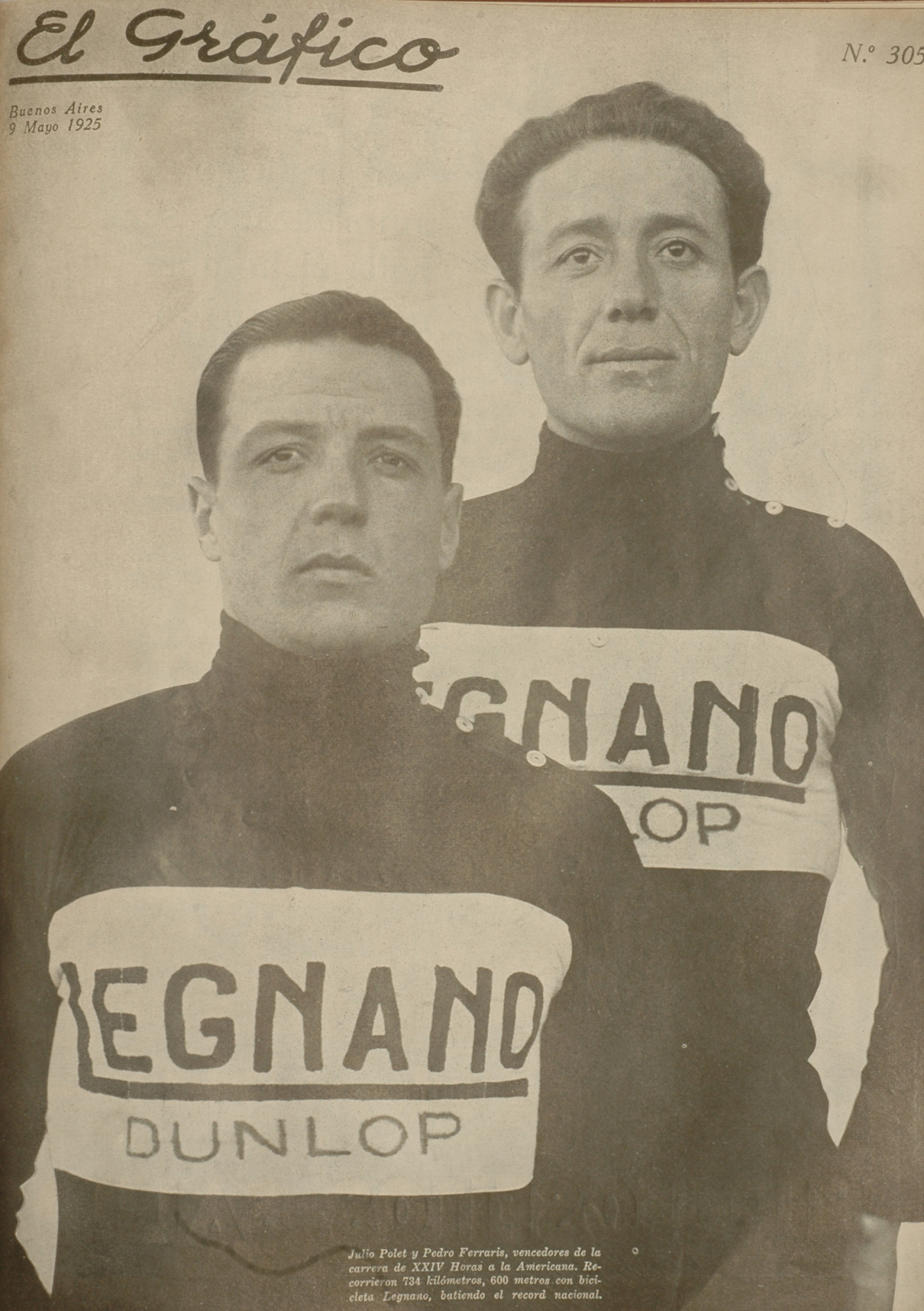

Personal information
- Born: 10 November 1898
- Died: 31 December 1946 (aged 48)

Cycling career
- Sport: Cycling

Julio Polet (10 November 1898 – 31 December 1946) was an Argentine cyclist. He competed in four events at the 1924 Summer Olympics.
