= Liberto Corney =

Uruguayan boxer (1905–1955)

- Born: 20 February 1905; Buenos Aires, Argentina
- Died: 23 July 1968 (aged 63)
- Occupation: Boxer

Liberto Corney Espallargas (20 February 1905 – 23 July 1968) was a Uruguayan boxer who competed in the 1924 Summer Olympics. He was born in Buenos Aires, Argentina. In 1924, he was eliminated in the first round of the lightweight class after losing his fight to Chris Graham of Canada.
