= Carmelo Merlo =

Argentine fencer

Personal information
- Born: 16 July 1881 Buenos Aires
- Died: 23 August 1963 (aged 82)

Sport
- Sport: Fencing

Carmelo Merlo (16 July 1881 – 23 August 1963) was an Argentine fencer. He competed in three Olympic Games in the sabre competitions.
