= Abelardo Rico =

Argentine sports shooter

Personal information
- Born: 14 August 1889
- Died: Unknown

Sport
- Sport: Sports shooting

Abelardo Rico (born 14 August 1889, date of death unknown) was an Argentine sports shooter. He competed in the 50 m rifle event at the 1924 Summer Olympics.
