= Arturo Ponce =

Argentine fencer

Personal information
- Born: 1886

Sport
- Sport: Fencing

Arturo Ponce (born 1886, date of death unknown) was an Argentine fencer. He competed in the individual and team sabre competitions at the 1924 Summer Olympics.
