= Cipriano Pons =

Argentine fencer

Personal information
- Born: 17 March 1890
- Died: 20 June 1985 (aged 95)

Sport
- Sport: Fencing

Cipriano Pons (17 March 1890 – 20 June 1985) was an Argentine fencer. He competed in the team épée competition at the 1924 Summer Olympics.
