= Ademar Agostinho Sauthier =

Brazilian Catholic priest

Ademar Sauthier Augustine (born 8 August 1940 in Osório) is a Brazilian Catholic priest of the Roman Catholic Archdiocese of Porto Alegre and Deputy Assistant Secretary for Pastoral of National Conference of Bishops of Brazil (CNBB).

== Biography ==
Ademar Sauthier studied philosophy and theology at the Our Lady Immaculate Conception Seminary in Viamão. He was ordained a priest on 20 December 1964. In 1989 Sauthier obtained a doctorate in philosophy at the Pontifical Gregorian University in Rome. His studies included a specialization in Pastoral Theology. He was pastor of the Shrine of Our Lady of Aparecida parish, in Porto Alegre from 1971 to 1977 and Our Lady of Perpetual Help Parish, in Porto Alegre. Sauthier taught at the Major Seminary of Viamão and Saint Bonaventure Institute in Brazil. From 2003 to 2006 he was executive secretary of the Southern Region 3 of CNBB; from 2002 to early 2007 was Episcopal Vicar of the Vicariate of Culture of the Archdiocese of Porto Alegre.

From 2007 to June 2011 Sauthier was Deputy Assistant Secretary for Pastoral CNBB in Brazil. On 4 June 2011 during the Assembly of Bishops of Rio Grande do Sul he was chosen again to fill the position of executive secretary of the Southern Region 3 of CNBB.

== Published books ==
Author

- Liberdade e compromisso : “O Tempo e o Vento” de Erico Verissimo. EDIPUCRS; ISBN 978-85-7430-753-4.
- Notebooks of FAFINC (1986)
- Freedom and Commitment: Erico Verissimo's The Time and the Wind: a philosophical inquiry (1989)
- Memories of my life: Clemente Sauthier (1998)
- Immigration Swiss-Valesana in Rio Grande do Sul (2005)

Co-author

- Adonis Valdir Fauth; Ademar Agostinho Sauthier; Angela da Silva Ribeiro. A imigração suíço-valesana no Rio Grande do Sul: 130 anos, nossa história escrevemos todos os dias. Associação Valesana do Brasil; 2005.
