= Vicente Valdero =

Spanish boxer

Vicente Valdero Cerdán (born 10 September 1905, date of death unknown) was a Spanish boxer who competed in the 1924 Summer Olympics. In 1924 he was eliminated in the second round of the lightweight class after losing his fight to Richard Beland of South Africa.
