= Haakon Hansen (boxer) =

Norwegian boxer

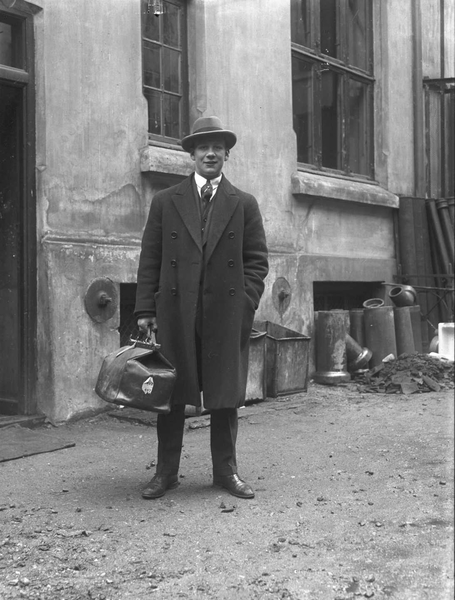
Norwegian boxer Haakon Hansen

Haakon Hansen (9 January 1907 – 28 May 1985) was a Norwegian boxer who competed in the 1924 Summer Olympics.

He was born and died in Oslo, and represented Kristiania AK. In 1924 he was eliminated in the quarterfinals of the lightweight class after losing his fight to the upcoming gold medalist Hans Jacob Nielsen.
