= Juan Martino =

Argentine sports shooter

Personal information
- Born: 1887
- Died: Unknown

Sport
- Sport: Sports shooting

Juan Martino (born 1887, date of death unknown) was an Argentine sports shooter. He competed in the 50 m rifle event at the 1924 Summer Olympics.
