= Luigi Marfut =

Italian boxer

Luigi Marfut (16 April 1904 in Rome – 1980) was an Italian boxer who competed in the 1924 Summer Olympics. In 1924 he was eliminated in the second round of the lightweight class after losing his fight to the eventual silver medalist Alfredo Copello.
