= John Bracegirdle =

English clergyman and poet

John Bracegirdle (died 1613–1614), was an English clergyman and poet.

Although Bracegirdle has been reported to have been a son of John Bracegirdle (more often seen as Bretchgirdle), vicar of Stratford-upon-Avon from 1560 to 1569, Bretchgirdle's will makes it clear that he was unmarried. He was matriculated as a sizar of Queens' College, Cambridge, in December 1588, proceeded B.A. in 1591-1592, commenced M.A. in 1595, and proceeded B.D. in 1602. He was inducted to the vicarage of Rye, Sussex, on the presentation of Thomas Sackville, Lord Buckhurst, 12 July 1602, and was buried there on 8 February 1613-14.

He is the author of 'Psychopharmacon, the Mindes Medicine; or the Phisicke of Philosophie, contained, in five bookes, called the Consolation of Philosophie, compiled by Anicius Manlius Torquatus Severinus Boethius,' translated into English blank verse, except the metres, which are in many different kinds of rhyme, Addit. MS. 11401. It is dedicated to Thomas Sackville, Earl of Dorset.
