= Jorge del Mazo =

Argentine sports shooter

Personal information
- Born: 3 June 1899 (age 127)

Sport
- Sport: Sports shooting

Jorge del Mazo (born 3 June 1899, date of death unknown) was an Argentine sports shooter. He competed in the 50 m rifle event at the 1924 Summer Olympics.
