= Frederick Boylstein =

American boxer

Medal record

Men's boxing

Representing the United States

Olympic Games
Bronze medal – third place	1924 Paris	Lightweight

Frederick Boylstein (March 15, 1902 – February 28, 1972) was a lightweight professional boxer from the United States, who competed in the 1920s. He won a bronze medal at the 1924 Summer Olympics in the lightweight division, losing against Alfredo Copello in the semi-finals.

== Pro career ==
Boylstein turned pro in 1925 and retired in 1930, having won 8, lost, and drawn 1.
