= Argentina national polo team =

Polo team in Argentina

Argentina
- Full name: Argentina national polo team
- Sport: Polo
- Based in: Buenos Aires
- Stadium: Campo Argentino de Polo
- Championships: List: World Polo Championship (5): 1987, 1992, 1998, 2011, 2017; Olympic Games (2): 1924, 1936

The Argentina national polo team (Spanish: Selección nacional de polo de Argentina) represents Argentina in international polo officially and it is controlled by the Argentine Polo Association.

== See also ==
- Argentine Polo Association
- Campo Argentino de Polo
