= Juan Miles =

Argentine polo player (1895–1981)

Olympic medal record

Men's polo
Gold medal – first place	1924 Paris	Team competition

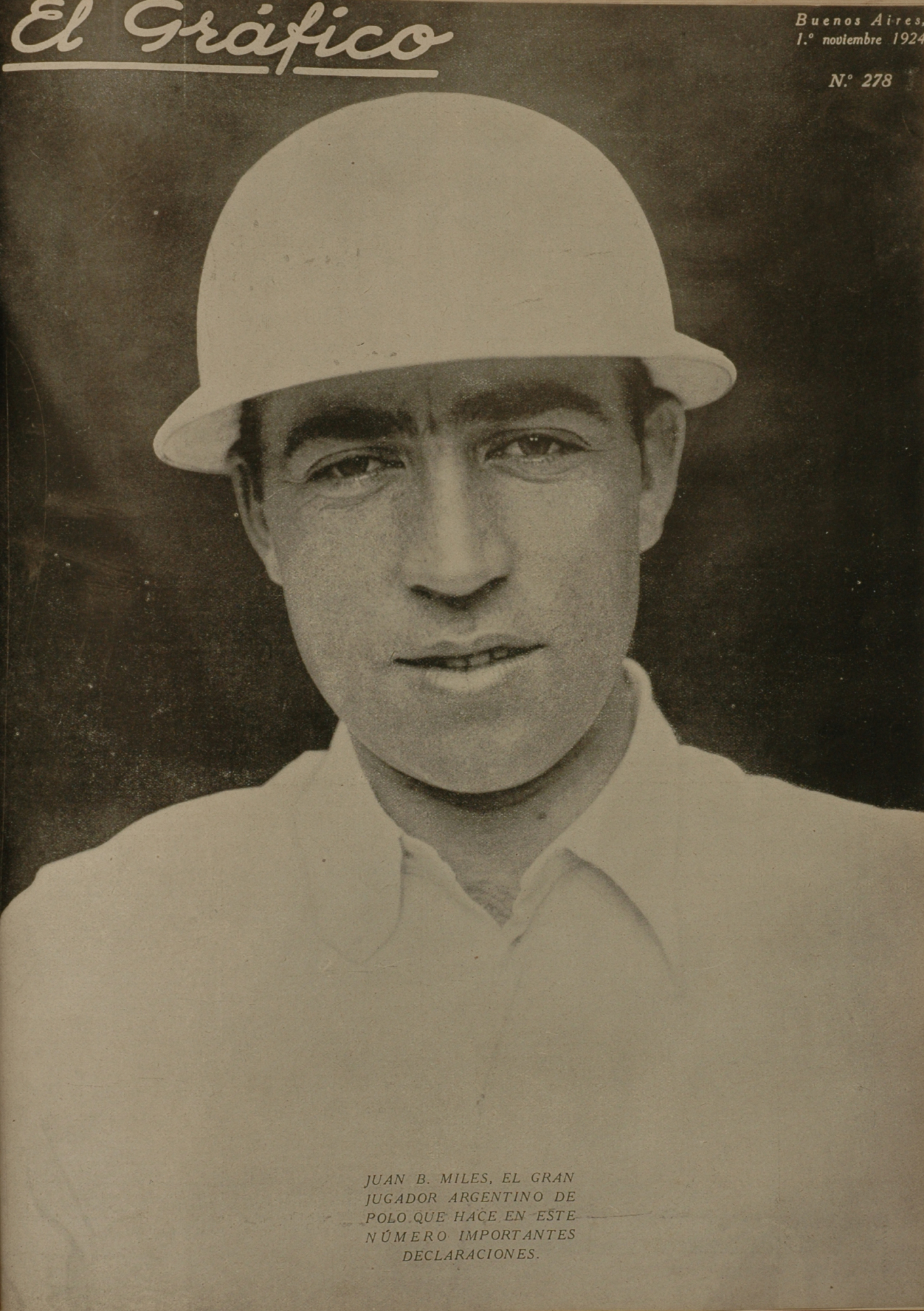
Miles in 1924

Juan Bautista Miles Passo (24 June 1895 – 18 December 1981) was an Argentine polo player who competed in the 1924 Summer Olympics. He was born and died in Buenos Aires. His nickname was "El Sordo" (The deaf) due to his hearing problems he got while he was working for a Railway Company in Buenos Aires. In 1924 Miles was part of the Argentine polo team, which won the gold medal.
