= Edgar Christensen =

Norwegian boxer

Medal record

Men's amateur boxing

Representing Norway

European Amateur Championships
Gold medal – first place	1927 Berlin	Middleweight

Edgar Normann Christensen (April 13, 1905 – July 13, 1977) was a Norwegian-American boxer who competed in the 1924 Summer Olympics. He was born in Minneapolis.

Edgar Normann Christensen competed in the Olympics on behalf of Norway in 1924 in Paris. He was eliminated in the second round of the welterweight class. He later took gold in the middleweight during the European Championship for amateurs in Berlin in 1927.

Under the name Edgar Normann, he fought professionally in the United States from November 1929 to July 1931. His career status after 8 years and 44 fights, 28 wins (including 15 by knockout), 9 losses (2 KO) and 7 draws.
