= Carlos Guerrico =

Argentine fencer

Personal information
- Born: 28 April 1889 Buenos Aires, Argentina
- Died: 7 December 1958 (aged 69)

Sport
- Sport: Fencing

Carlos Guerrico (28 April 1889 – 27 December 1958) was an Argentine fencer. He competed in the individual foil competition at the 1924 Summer Olympics.
