= Hugh Haggerty =

American boxer

Hugh Haggerty (January 1, 1905 – August 5, 1941) was an American boxer who competed in the 1924 Summer Olympics. He was born in Pittsburgh, Pennsylvania and died in Etna, Pennsylvania at the age of 36.

After two knockout victories in the 1924 Summer Olympics in Paris, Haggerty was eliminated in the quarterfinals of the welterweight division, losing his fight on points to the eventual bronze medalist Douglas Lewis of Canada. Along with his brothers Harry and Johnny, Hugh returned home and became part of the storied history of Pittsburgh boxing during the 1920s and 1930s.
