= Ko Cornelissen =

Dutch boxer

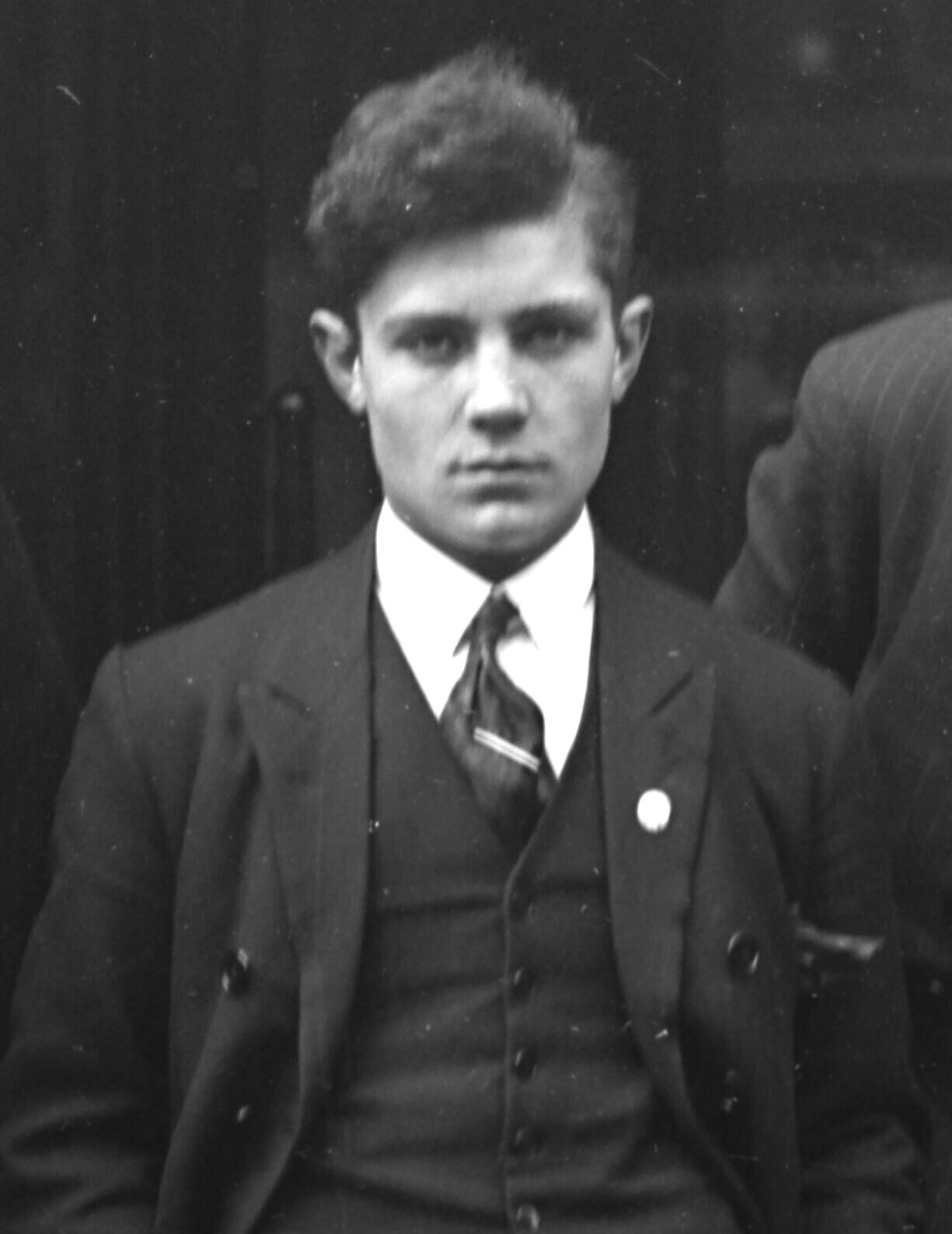
Ko Cornelissen in 1924

Jacobus Gerardus “Ko” Cornelissen (29 January 1904, Amsterdam - 10 December 1954, Amsterdam) was a Dutch boxer who was a six-time national champion. He won his first title at the age of 16.

Cornelissen competed in the 1924 Summer Olympics in Paris. After winning the first round by decision against Alf Johan Pedersen from Norway, he lost in the second round against Patrick “Paddy” Dwyer, alias Rocky, from Ireland. Cornelissen was a member of D.O.S Amsterdam for 25 years, and won several National titles:

- 1920 Featherweight
- 1921 Lightweight
- 1923 Welterweight
- 1925 Unknown weight class
- 1926 Middleweight
- 1927 Middleweight

After his boxing career he acted for various years as a boxing referee. Shortly after the Second World War he contracted typhus and subsequently emphysema from which he died in 1954.

== Jan Cornelisse ==
Due to sloppy administration in 1924, Cornelissen has until recently been known as "Jan Cornelisse" in official Olympic records. Of the nine Dutch boxers at the 1924 games, five were registered under the wrong name.
