= Enrique Padilla (polo) =

Argentine polo player

Olympic medal record

Men's polo
Gold medal – first place	1924 Paris	Team competition

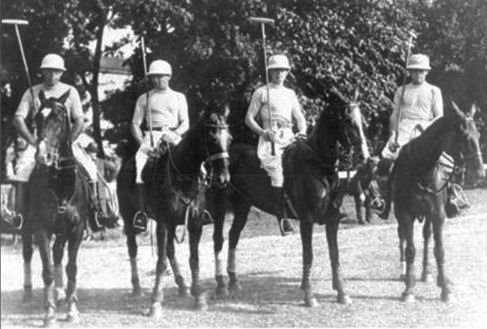
Enrique Padilla (second from left) as part of the Argentine Olympic team in 1924

Enrique Padilla (born 12 June 1890, date of death unknown) was an Argentine polo player who competed in the 1924 Summer Olympics. In 1924 he was part of the Argentine polo team, which won the gold medal.
