= Théodore Stauffer =

Swiss boxer

Personal information
- Nationality: Swiss
- Born: 29 May 1901
- Died: 13 October 1971 (aged 70)

Sport
- Sport: Boxing

Théodore Stauffer (29 May 1901 – 13 October 1971) was a Swiss boxer. He competed in the men's welterweight event at the 1924 Summer Olympics.
