= Richard Beland =

South African boxer (1896–1970)

Personal information
- Nationality: South African
- Born: 30 November 1896; Johannesburg, South African Republic
- Died: 27 February 1970 (aged 73)

Sport
- Sport: Boxing

Richard Beland (30 November 1896 – 27 February 1970) was a South African boxer. He competed at the 1920 Summer Olympics and the 1924 Summer Olympics.
