= Douglas Lewis (boxer) =

Canadian boxer

Olympic medal record

Men's Boxing
Bronze medal – third place	1924 Paris	Welterweight

Douglas Lewis (August 6, 1898 – February 19, 1981) was a welterweight professional boxer from Canada, who competed in the 1920s. Lewis trained out of Toronto's Praestamus Athletic Club, where Larry Gains also trained. He won the bronze medal in Boxing at the 1924 Summer Olympics in the welterweight division, losing against Jean Delarge in the semi-finals. He was born in Toronto, Ontario. After his boxing career, he moved to Los Angeles, California where he was a boxing trainer. In 1951, he obtained a patent for a new kind of boxing hand bandage.
