= Héctor Méndez (boxer) =

Argentine boxer (1897–1977)

Olympic medal record

Men's Boxing
Silver medal – second place	1924 Paris	Welterweight

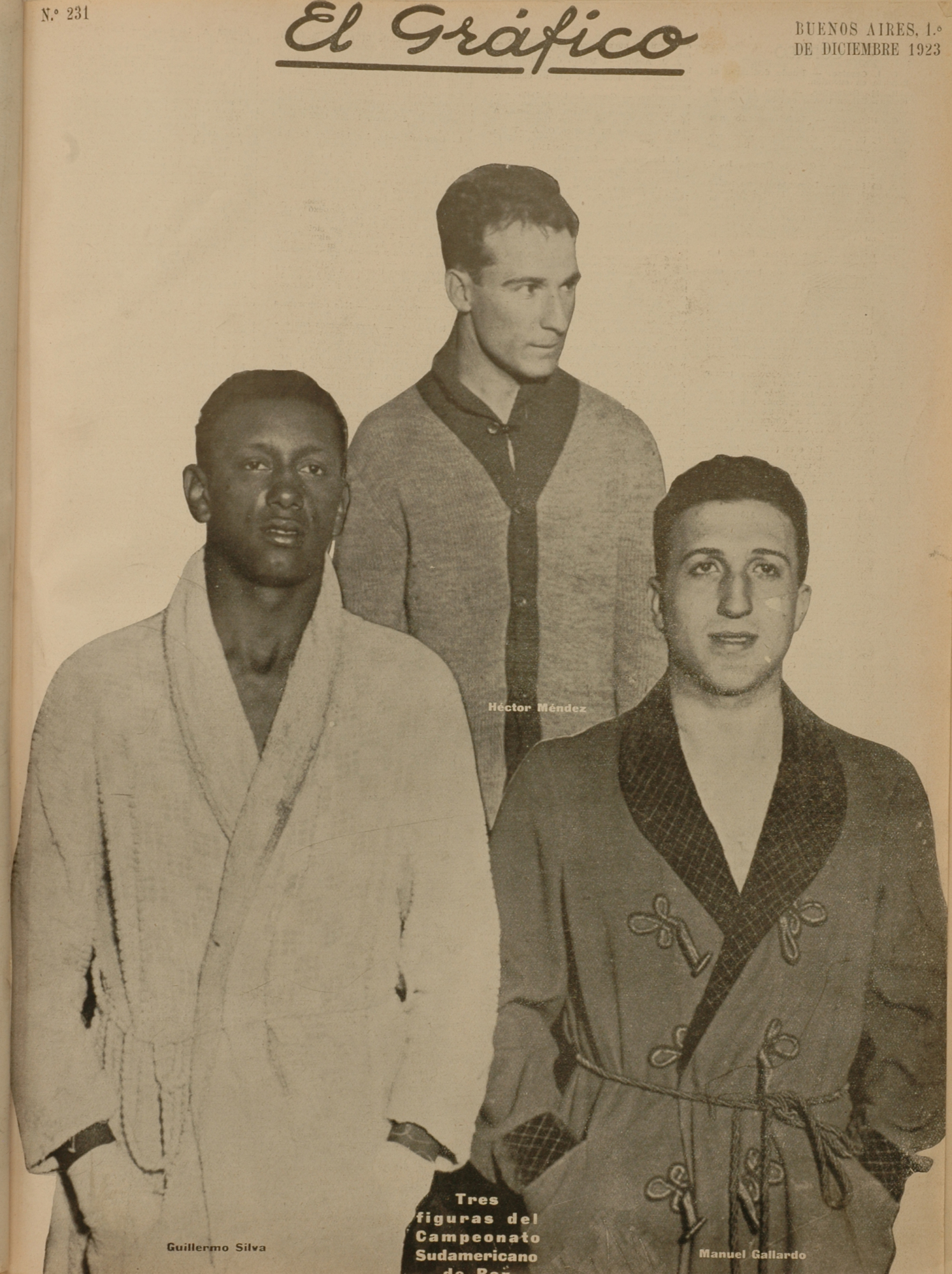
Guillermo Silva, Héctor Méndez, and Manuel Gallardo featured in El Gráfico from December 1923

Héctor Eugene Méndez (1 August 1897 – 13 December 1977) was an Argentine welterweight professional boxer who competed in the 1920s. He won a silver medal at the 1924 Summer Olympics, losing against Jean DeLarge in the final bout. Héctor was the flag bearer for his country at the opening ceremony of the 1928 Summer Olympics.
