= Alfredo Porzio =

Argentine boxer

Olympic medal record

Men's Boxing
Bronze medal – third place	1924 Paris	Heavyweight

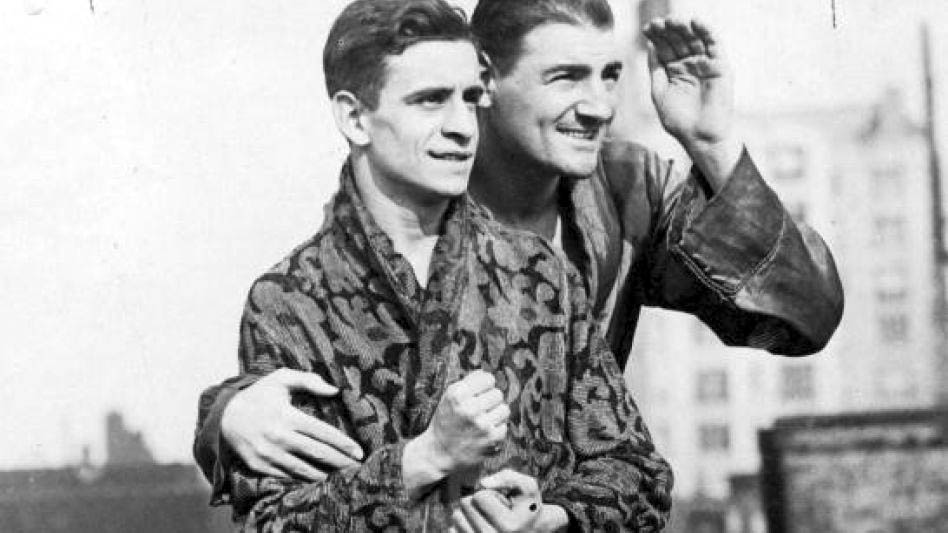
Alfredo Porzio (right)

Alfredo Porzio (31 August 1900 – 14 September 1976) was an Argentine heavyweight professional boxer who competed in the 1920s. He was born in Buenos Aires.

== Amateur career ==
As an amateur, Porzio won the South American Heavyweight Championship in Buenos Aires, CF, Argentina, in 1923. He won a bronze medal in boxing at the 1924 Summer Olympics in the heavyweight division, losing against Otto von Porat in the semi-final.
