= Antonio Daneri =

Argentine sports shooter

Personal information
- Born: 11 September 1884 Buenos Aires, Argentina

Sport
- Sport: Sports shooting

Antonio Daneri (born 11 September 1884, date of death unknown) was an Argentine sports shooter. He competed at the 1924 Summer Olympics and the 1932 Summer Olympics.
