= Otto von Porat =

Norwegian boxer (1903–1982)

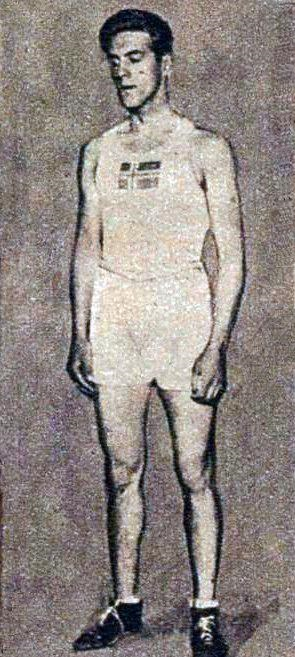

Medal record

Men's boxing

Representing Norway
Gold medal – first place	1924 Paris	Heavyweight

Otto Wessel von Porat (29 November 1903 – 14 October 1982) was a Swedish-born Norwegian heavyweight boxer. He won a gold medal in Boxing at the 1924 Summer Olympics, defeating Danish boxer Søren Petersen in the final.

== Background ==
Von Porat was born in the little parish of Pjätteryd, Kronoberg County, Sweden, into an independently wealthy family. The von Porats lived on a huge estate in Sweden. An English tutor gave von Porat and his three brothers their early education, hence von Porat learned to speak English with a decidedly British accent. He also learned to speak Danish, Swedish, Norwegian, German and French fluently.

While very young, he and his family moved to Copenhagen, Denmark, where his father organized a branch of the Berlitz Language School. In early 1914 the family settled in Oslo, Norway, where his father made extensive maritime investments. The von Porat fortune disappeared rapidly when World War I came along, forcing the four von Porat boys to seek work.

== Amateur career ==
It was while employed as a minor clerk in the office of an Oslo shipping agent that von Porat became interested in boxing. He knocked out two opponents in one evening during his first amateur tournament. Shortly thereafter he knocked out the amateur middleweight champion of Denmark in two rounds. Otto von Porat went on to defeat all the best heavyweight amateurs in Europe, then won the Olympic Heavyweight Gold Medal at the 1924 Paris Olympics. He returned to Norway to serve in the Norwegian Army.

He represented the club Oslo AK.

== Pro career ==
Von Porat then came to the United States in the summer of 1926, turning professional at that time. He generally fought in the rings of Minneapolis, New York City, and Chicago. He was a huge drawing card in the Chicago area. He could often be found at the Chicago Norske Klub, a Norwegian-American cultural center. It is said that his fight with Paulino Uzcudun "gave rise to the wide-spread impression that von Porat lack[ed] aggressiveness and ... the 'killer instinct.' Although he had a once-promising career and was a top contender for the Heavyweight Title, von Porat apparently lacked self-confidence and thus "lost fighting strength in the rough American school."

== Life after boxing ==
After his boxing career ended von Porat continued to live in Chicago. In 1982 he died in Bærum, Norway.

== Trivia ==
- Featured on the cover of the April 1930 The Ring magazine.
- One of only four Norwegian boxers to have gained success in America during the 20th Century, along with Terry Martin, Haakon Hansen, and Pete Sanstol.
