= Jean Delarge =

Belgian boxer

Olympic medal record

Men's Boxing

Representing Belgium
Gold medal – first place	1924 Paris	Welterweight

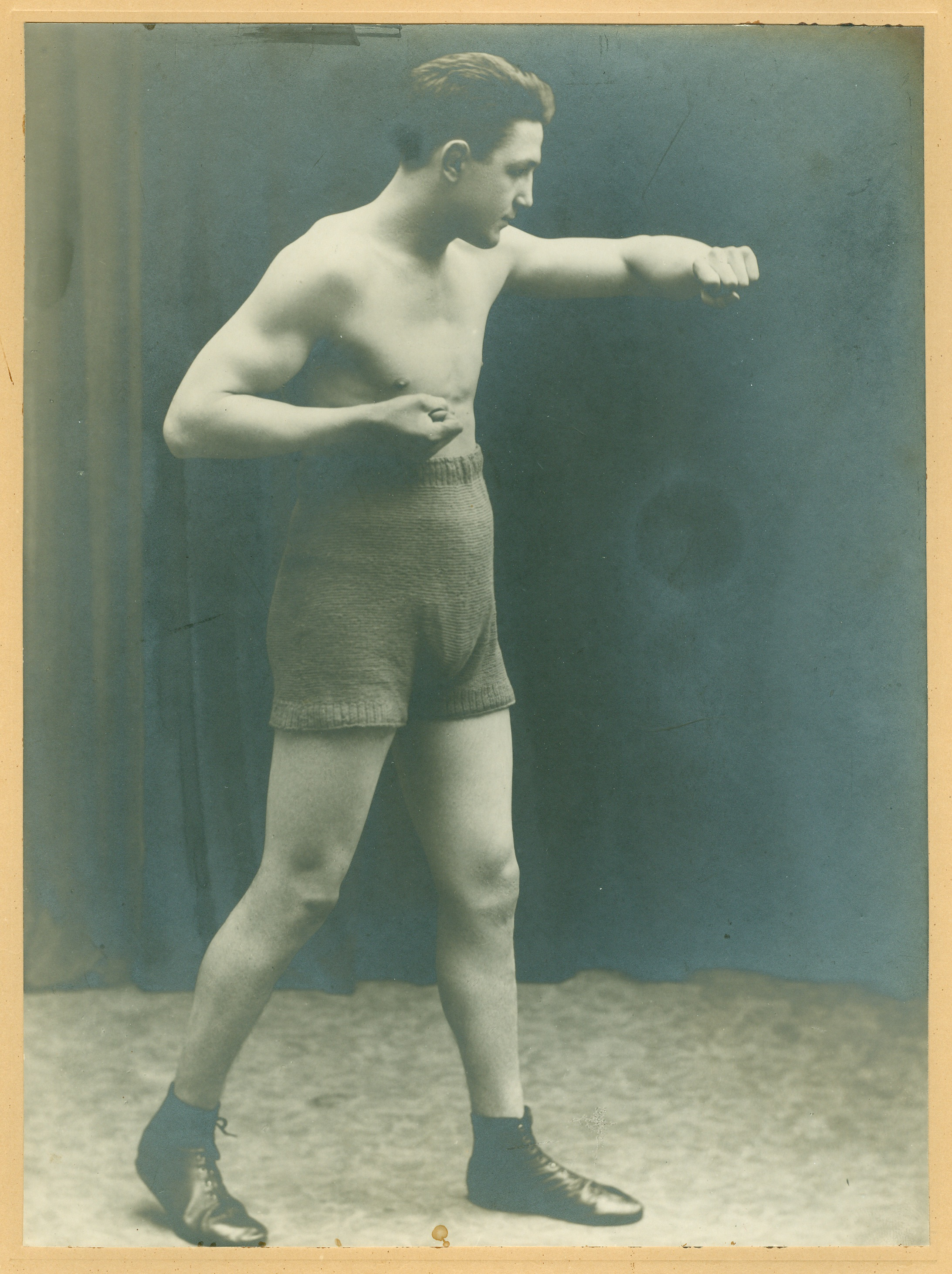
Jean delarge

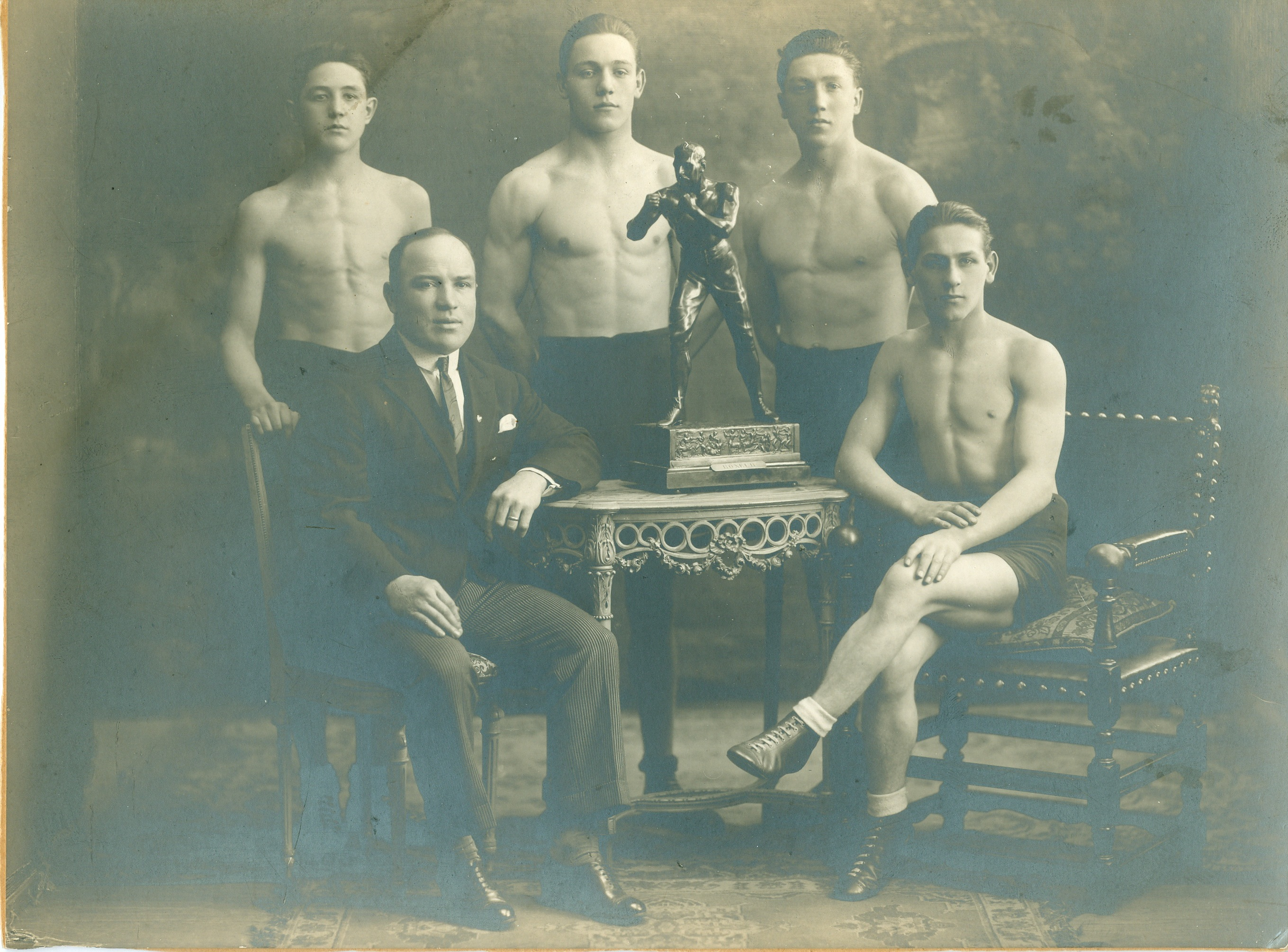
OLYMPIADE 1924 RETOUR A LIEGE 1

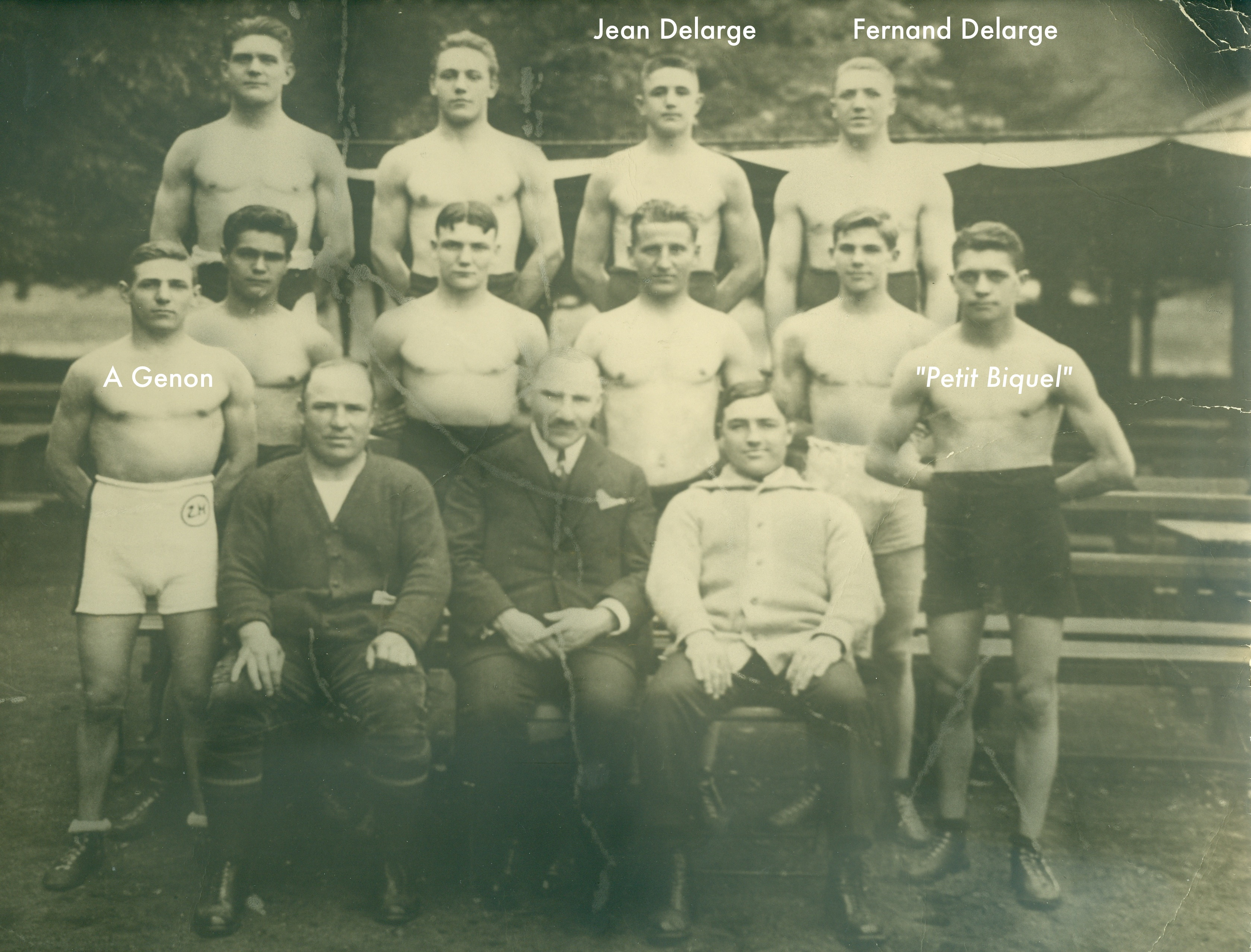
Jean deluge gold medal boxing olympics 1924Fernand Delarge Champion d'europeA Genon Champion d'Europe Welter

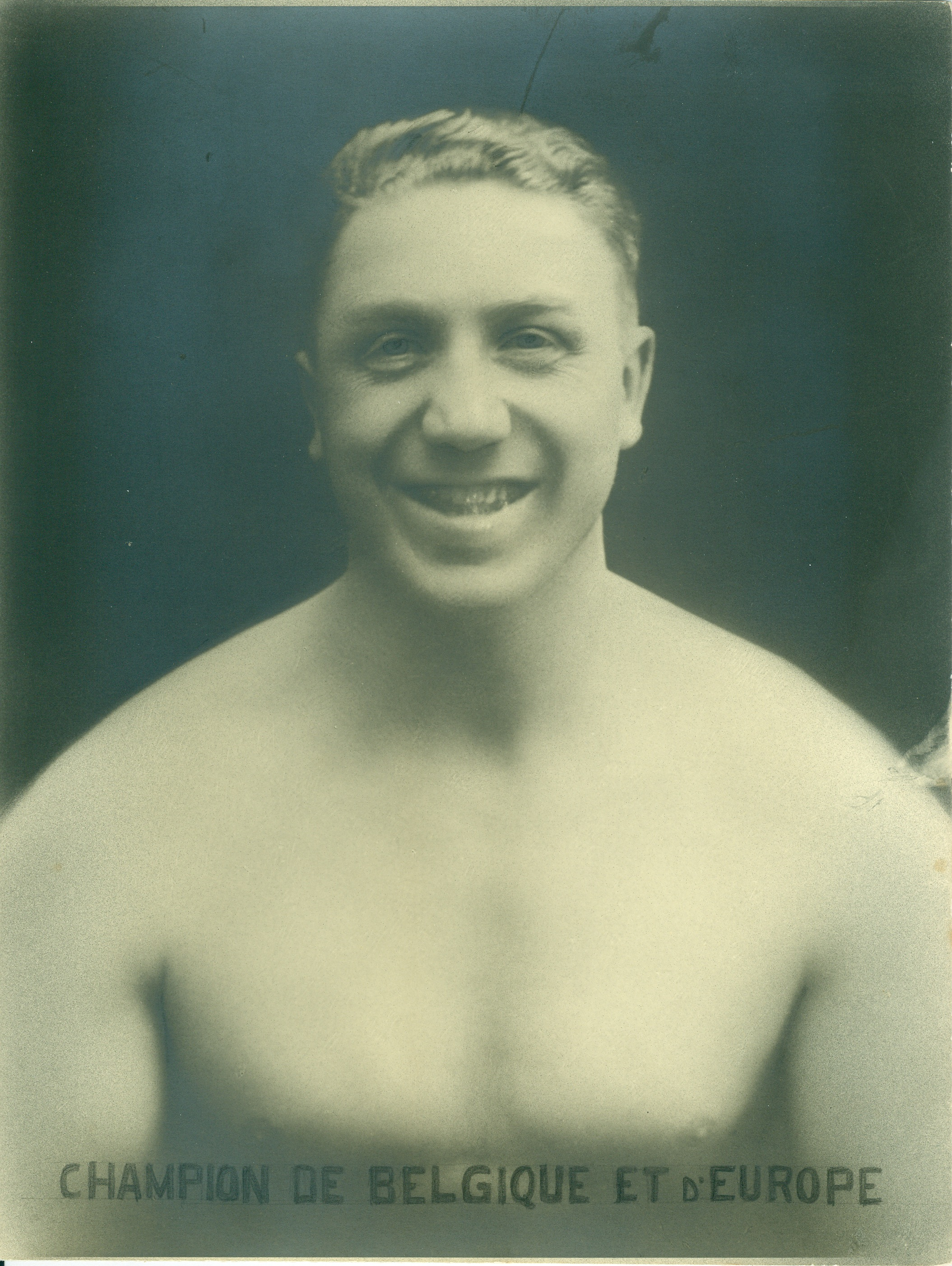
Jean delarge Champion de belgique et d Europe

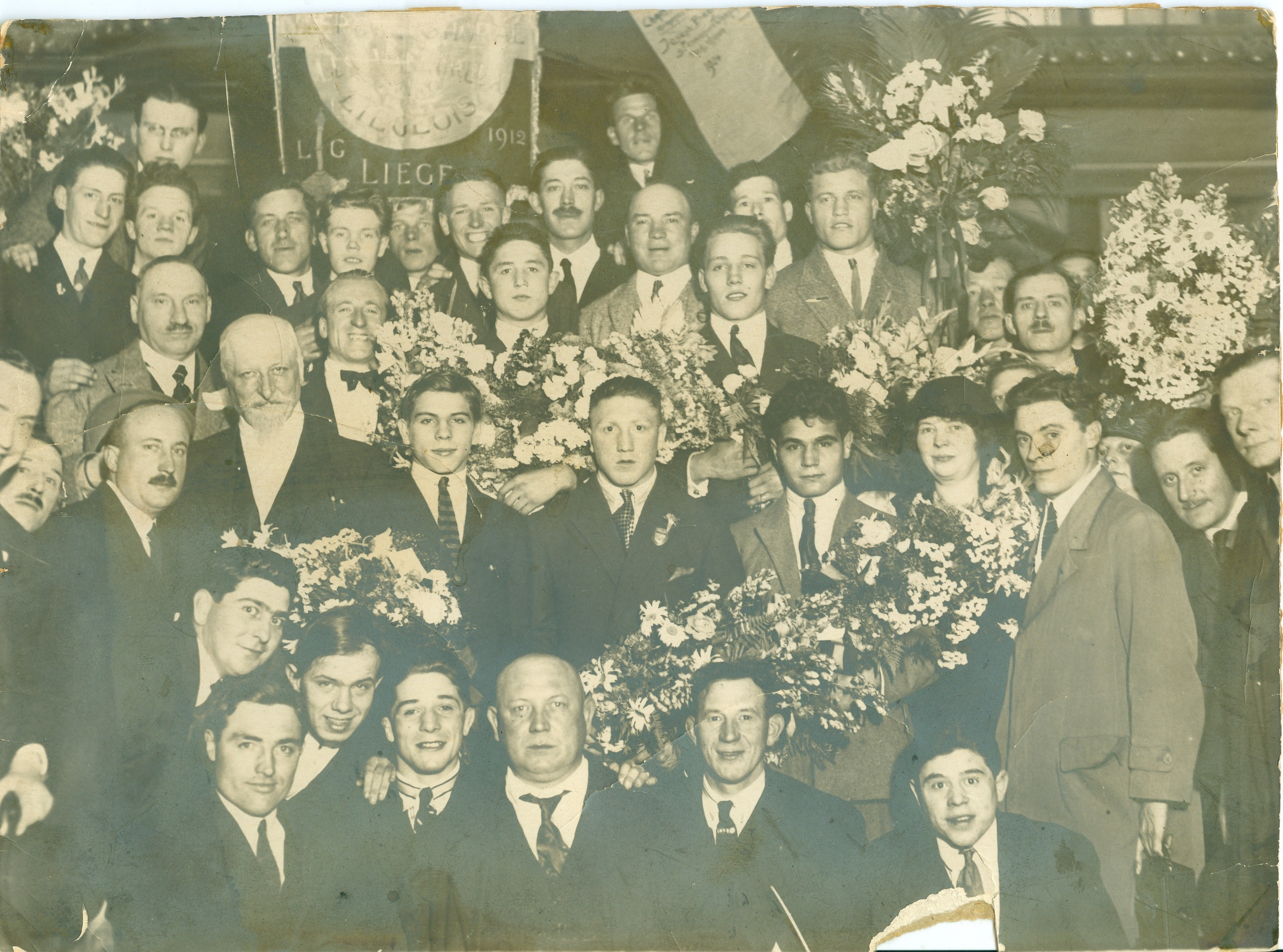
retour a liège après les jeux olympiques de 1924 avec la médaille d'or en boxe. Acceuil a l'hotel de ville de liege

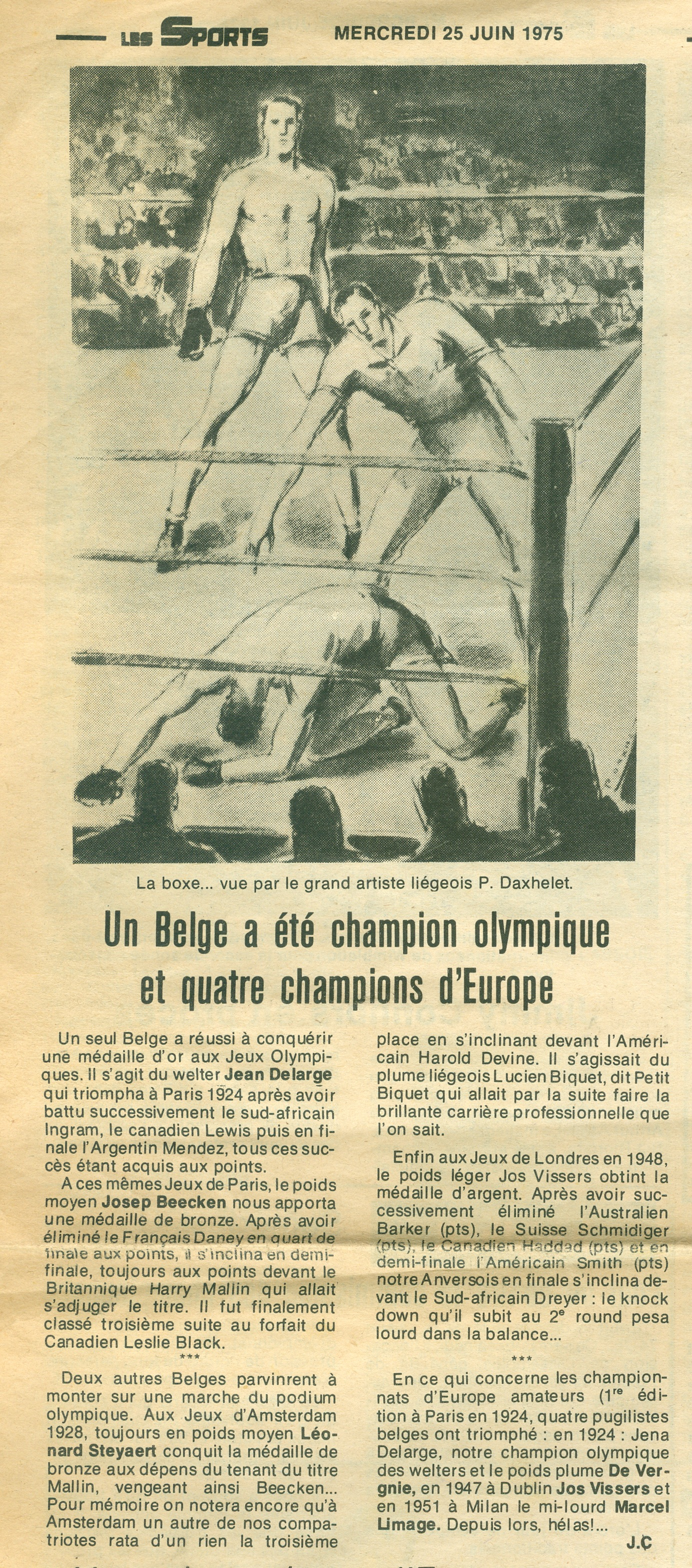
Jean delarge Champion de belgique et d Europe 2

Jean Delarge (6 April 1906 – 7 July 1977) was a Belgian welterweight professional boxer who competed in the 1920s. He was born in Liège. Delarge won the gold medal in boxing at the 1924 Summer Olympics in the welterweight category, defeating Héctor Méndez in the final.
