= Hans Jacob Nielsen =

Danish boxer (1899–1967)

Hans Nielsen
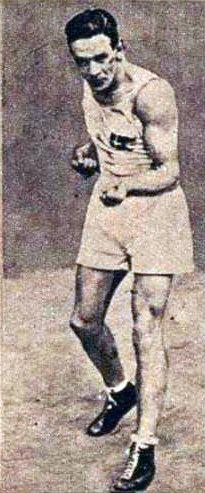
- Nielsen, Olympic lightweight champion in 1924

Medal record

Men's boxing

Representing Denmark

Olympic Games
| Gold medal – first place | 1924 Paris | Lightweight |

Hans Jacob Nielsen (2 September 1899 in Næstved – 6 February 1967 in Aalborg) was a Danish featherweight and lightweight boxer who competed in the 1920s.

He was reigning world champion between 1924 and 1928 after winning the gold medal in boxing at the 1924 Summer Olympics in the lightweight category, defeating Alfredo Copello in the final.

His first Olympic appearance was at the 1920 Antwerp Games when he was eliminated in the second round of the featherweight class after losing his fight to James Cater.

At the Amsterdam Olympics in 1928, Nielsen tried to defend his Olympic title in the lightweight division but lost in the semifinal to the eventual gold medalist Carlo Orlandi. Nielsen also lost the bronze medal bout to Gunnar Berggren and thus finished fourth.

== 1920 Olympic results ==
Below is the record of Hans Jacob Nielsen, a Danish featherweight boxer who competed at the 1920 Antwerp Olympics:

- Round of 32: bye
- Round of 16: lost to James Cater (Great Britain) by decision
