= Alfredo Copello =

Argentine boxer

Olympic medal record

Men's Boxing
Silver medal – second place	1924 Paris	Lightweight

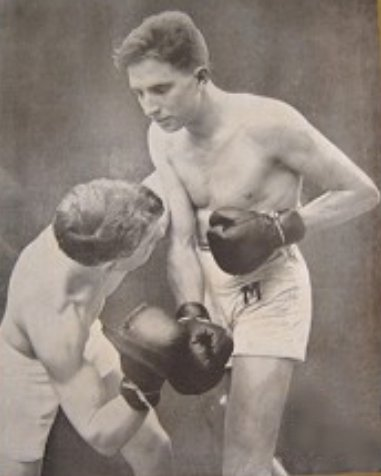
Alfredo Copello during a bout in 1922

Alfredo Copello (born 15 March 1903, died 1986 in Buenos Aires) was an Argentine lightweight professional boxer who competed in the 1920s. He won a silver medal in Boxing at the 1924 Summer Olympics, having lost to the Danish Hans Jacob Nielsen in the final bout.
