= De Jong =

De Jong (Dutch pronunciation: [də ˈjɔŋ]) is a Dutch language surname meaning "young". It is the most common surname in the Netherlands, represented by 86,534 people in 2017. It may also be found in the anglicized form Young or De Young.

Notable people with the surname are listed in the sections below.

== Academics ==
- Aise Johan de Jong (born 1966), Dutch mathematician
- Arie de Jong (1865–1957), Dutch physician and linguist (Volapük)
- Catherine de Jong (born 1956), Dutch anesthesiologist and drug rehab physician
- Gerrit de Jong Jr. (1892–1978), Dutch-born Dean of Brigham Young University
- Jan Willem de Jong (1921–2000), Dutch indologist
- John H.A.L. de Jong (born 1947), Dutch linguist
- Kenneth A De Jong, American computer scientist
- Loe de Jong (1914–2005), Dutch historian and journalist
- Mayke de Jong (born 1950), Dutch historian
- Piet de Jong (born 1938), Dutch dendrologist
- William DeJong (born 1950), American researcher in alcohol abuse

== Arts ==
- Ate de Jong (born 1953), Dutch film director
- Bettie de Jong (born 1933), Dutch dancer
- Boaz de Jong (born 1988), Dutch music producer and DJ known as "Boaz van de Beatz"
- Constance DeJong (visual artist) (born 1950), American sculptor and painter
- Eddie de Jong (born 1950), Dutch cartoonist
- Erik de Jong (born 1961), Dutch singer-songwriter known as Spinvis
- Esther De Jong (born 1974), Dutch model, artist and writer
- Florence De Jong (1894–1990), English theatre and cinema organist
- Folkert de Jong (born 1972), Dutch artist
- Hans de Jong (1932–2011), Dutch sculptor, designer and ceramist
- Henry de Jong (born 2001) New Zealand lead drummer
- Jacqueline de Jong (born 1939), Dutch painter and sculptor
- Jane de Jong (born 1987), New Zealand singer who performs under the name Ruby Frost
- Jill de Jong (born 1982), Dutch model and actress
- Lewis de Jong (born 2003) New Zealand lead guitarist and vocals
- Marinus De Jong (1891–1984), Dutch-born Belgian composer and pianist
- Mark de Jong, Dutch Trance DJ
- Matt de Jong, graphic designer and art director
- Maurice de Jong (born 1973), Dutch rock musician known as "Mories"
- Michael De Jong (1945–2018), Dutch–American blues guitarist and singer-songwriter
- Mijke de Jong (born 1959), Dutch film director
- Paul de Jong, Dutch-American cellist
- Piet de Jong (artist) (1887–1967), English artist
- Pieter de Jong (c. 1610–after 1639), Dutch guard portrayed by Frans Hals
- Sam de Jong, New Zealand record producer
- Tania de Jong, Dutch-born Australian soprano and entrepreneur
- Sjoerd De Jong (born ca. 1984), Dutch level designer/game artist

== Politics and religion ==
- Alida de Jong (1885–1943), Jewish-Dutch politician
- Bert de Jong (politician) (1945–2026), Dutch politician
- Cameron DeJong (born 1979), American (New Hampshire) politician
- Dennis de Jong (born 1955), Dutch politician
- Everard de Jong (born 1958), Dutch Roman Catholic auxiliary bishop
- Frank de Jong (born 1955), Canadian politician and environmentalist
- Harry de Jong (1932–2014), Canadian (British Columbia) politician
- Jacob de Jong (c.1700–c.1764), Dutch Governor of Ceylon in 1752
- Johannes de Jong (1885–1955), Dutch Roman Catholic Cardinal
- Léon de Jong (born 1982), Dutch politician
- Mike de Jong (born 1963/64), Canadian politician
- Piet de Jong (1915–2016), Prime Minister of the Netherlands 1967–1971
- Simon De Jong (1942–2011), Dutch-born Canadian politician
- Winny de Jong (born 1958), Dutch politician

== Sports ==
=== Football ===
- Aad de Jong (1921–2003), Dutch football defender
- Andre de Jong (born 1996), New Zealand football forward
- Boy de Jong (born 1994), Dutch football goalkeeper
- Djenna de Jong (born 2005), footballer
- Fred de Jong (born 1964), New Zealand football striker
- Frenkie de Jong (born 1997), Dutch football midfielder
- Henk de Jong (born 1964), Dutch football manager
- Jason de Jong (born 1990), Filipino football midfielder
- Jean-Paul de Jong (born 1970), Dutch football midfielder and manager
- Jerry de Jong (born 1964), Dutch football defender
- John de Jong (born 1977), Dutch football midfielder
- Luuk de Jong (born 1990), Dutch football forward
- Marcel de Jong (born 1986), Canadian soccer player
- Nick de Jong (born 1989), Dutch football midfielder
- Nigel de Jong (born 1984), Dutch football midfielder
- Siem de Jong (born 1989), Dutch football midfielder
- Theo de Jong (born 1947), Dutch football midfielder and coach
- Tommy De Jong (born 1987), French football striker

=== Other sports ===
- Antoinette de Jong (born 1995), Dutch speed skater
- Arie de Jong (1882–1966), Dutch fencer
- Barbara de Jong (born 1952), Dutch rower
- Bert de Jong (born 1955), Dutch speed skater
- Bert de Jong (1956–2013), Dutch rally driver
- Bianca de Jong-Muhren (born 1986), Dutch chess grandmaster
- Bob de Jong (born 1976), Dutch speed skater
- Chase De Jong (born 1993), American baseball pitcher
- Daniël de Jong (born 1992), Dutch racing driver
- Demi de Jong (born 1995), Dutch cyclist
- Dimi de Jong (born 1994), Dutch snowboarder
- Doris de Jong (1902–1991), Dutch fencer
- Haley de Jong (born 2001), Canadian artistic gymnast
- Idske de Jong (born 1984), Dutch curler
- Imani de Jong (born 2002), Dutch swimmer
- Jan de Jong (1942–2009), ice master of the Thialf skating stadium
- Jannick de Jong (born 1987), Dutch motorcycle racer
- Jesper de Jong (born 2000), Dutch tennis player
- Joel de Jong (born 2002), Dutch Paralympic sprinter
- Johanna de Jong (1895–1976), Dutch fencer
- Jordan De Jong (born 1979), American baseball pitcher
- Jos De Jong (1920–1986), Belgian wrestler
- Koos de Jong (1912–1993), Dutch sailor
- Letitia de Jong (born 1993), Dutch speed skater
- Linda de Jong, New Zealand rower
- Marjolein de Jong (born 1968), Dutch volleyball player
- Martijn de Jong (born 1974), Dutch mixed martial artist
- Mike de Jong (born 1963 or 1964), Canadian politician
- Nick de Jong (sailor) (born 1942), Dutch sailor
- Nicolaas de Jong (1887–1966), Dutch cyclist
- Nicolas de Jong (born 1988), Dutch-French basketball player
- Paul DeJong (born 1993), American baseball player
- Petronella de Jong (born 1970), Dutch sailor
- Rachelle de Jong (born 1979), Canadian rower
- Reggie de Jong (born 1964), Dutch swimmer
- Reuben de Jong, New Zealand kickboxer
- Rita de Jong (born 1965), Dutch rower
- Sidney de Jong (1979–2026), Dutch baseball player
- Thalita de Jong (born 1993), Dutch cyclist
- Tonny de Jong (born 1974), Dutch speed skater
- Worthy de Jong (born 1988), Dutch basketball player
- Xenia Stad-de Jong (1922–2012), Dutch sprinter

== Writers and journalists ==
- Constance DeJong (born 1950), American librettist and playwright
- Daphne de Jong (born 1939), pseudonym of New Zealand romance writer Clair de Jong
- Dola de Jong (1911–2003), Dutch-American writer
- Meindert De Jong (1906–1991), Dutch-born American author
- Oek de Jong (born 1952), Dutch novelist

== As part of a compound surname ==
- Robin Huisman de Jong (born 1988), Dutch footballer
- J.P.B. de Josselin de Jong (1886–1964), Dutch anthropologist
- P.E. de Josselin de Jong (1922–1999), Dutch anthropologist
- Pieter de Josselin de Jong (1861–1906), Dutch painter
- Johanna Stokhuyzen-de Jong (1895–1976), Dutch fencer
- Theodoor Johan Arnold van Zijll de Jong (1836–1917), Dutch military leader

== See also ==
- 76272 De Jong, an asteroid
- De Jonge
- De Jongh
- Jong (disambiguation)
