= De Jongh =

De Jongh is a Dutch surname meaning "junior". It is a variation of the more common form "de Jong" or "de Jonge". Among people with the surname "de Jongh", "de Iongh" or "de Jonghe" are:

- Adri de Jongh (born 1970), South African sprinter
- Aimée de Jongh (born 1988), Dutch cartoonist
- Andrée de Jongh (1916–2007), Belgian World War II resistance fighter
- Claude de Jongh (1605–1663), Dutch landscape painter
- Dick de Jongh (born 1939), Dutch logician
- Eddy de Jongh (born 1931), Dutch art historian
- Emily de Jongh-Elhage (born 1946), Netherlands Antilles politician
- Gabriel de Jongh (1913–2004), Dutch-born South African painter
- Grietje de Jongh (1924–2002), Dutch sprinter
- Hendrik Pieter de Jongh (born 1970), Dutch football manager
- Igone de Jongh (born 1979), Dutch ballet dancer
- John de Jongh Jr. (born 1957), American territorial administrator
- Juan de Jongh (born 1988), South African rugby player
- Jules de Jongh, American voice actress
- Lilly de Jongh Osborne (1883–1975), Costa Rican writer and art collector
- Ludolf Leendertsz de Jongh (1616–1679), Dutch genre and portrait painter
- Mandy de Jongh (born 1961), Dutch taekwondo practitioner
- Mawar Eva de Jongh (born 2001), Indonesian actress
- Michelle De Jongh (born 1997), Swedish footballer
- Nicholas de Jongh (born 1944), British theatre critic and playwright
- Steven de Jongh (born 1973), Dutch bicycle racer
- Theunis Willem de Jongh (1913–1999/2000), South African bank governor
- Tinus de Jongh (1885–1942), Dutch-born South African painter

De Iongh

- Carel de Iongh (1883–1964), Dutch soldier and sports shooter, brother of Hendrik
- Hendrik de Iongh (1877–1962), Dutch soldier and fencer, brother of Carel

De Jonghe / Dejonghe

- Adriaen de Jonghe (1511–1575), Dutch Renaissance humanist
- Albert Dejonghe (1894–1981), Belgian racing cyclist
- Gustave Léonard de Jonghe (1829–1893), Belgian portrait and genre painter
- Jan Baptiste de Jonghe (1785–1844), Belgian landscape painter
- Jimmy De Jonghe (born 1992), Belgian footballer
- Kevin De Jonghe (born 1991), Belgian racing cyclist
- Sam Dejonghe (born 1991), Belgian racing driver

== See also ==
- De Jong
- De Jonge
- Jong (disambiguation)
