= Bert de Jong =

Bert de Jong may refer to:

- Bert de Jong (speed skater) (born 1955), Dutch speed skater
- Bert de Jong (rally driver) (1956–2013), Dutch rally champion
- Bert de Jong (politician) (1945–2026), member of the Dutch Senate

== See also ==
- De Jong
