= De Jonge =

De Jonge is a Dutch surname meaning the younger. People with this surname include:

- Bonifacius de Jonge (1567–1625), Grand Pensionary of Zeeland
- Bonifacius Cornelis de Jonge (1875–1958), Dutch politician
- Brendon de Jonge (born 1980), Zimbabwean golfer
- Carla de Jonge (1886–1972), Dutch art historian and museum director
- Constantin Ranst de Jonge (1635–1714), Dutch whaler
- Cornelis Matelief de Jonge (1569–1632), Dutch admiral
- Freek de Jonge (born 1944), Dutch cabaret performer
- Hugo de Jonge (born 1977), Dutch politician
- Jan de Jonge (born 1963), Dutch footballer
- Jan Martszen de Jonge (1609–1647) Dutch painter
- Johan Karel Jakob de Jonge (1828–1880), Dutch historian, museum curator, and draftsman
- Johannes Cornelis de Jonge (1793–1853), Dutch politician and historian
- Laura de Jonge (born 1960), Canadian filmmaker
- Maarten de Jonge (born 1985), Dutch racing cyclist
- Marc de Jonge (1949–1996), French actor
- Mark de Jonge (born 1984), Canadian canoeist
- Olivia DeJonge (born 1998), Australian actress
- Peter de Jonge (born 1954), American writer
- Saskia de Jonge (born 1986), Dutch swimmer

Often "de Jonge" is not part of the surname, but like "junior" indicates that the person's father had the same name. Some examples of these are:

- Constantin Ranst de Jonge (1635–1714), Dutch East India Company trader
- Cornelis Evertsen de Jonge (1628–1679), Dutch admiral
- Jan Jansz de Jonge Stampioen (1610–1690), Dutch mathematician
- Ryklof van Goens de jonge (1642–1687), Governor of Dutch Ceylon
- Willem van de Velde, de Jonge (1633–1707), Dutch marine painter

== See also ==
- De Jong (disambiguation)
- De Jongh
- Jong (disambiguation)
