= Jong =

Jong may refer to:

== Surname ==
- Jung (Korean surname), spelled Jong in North Korea
- Zhong (surname), spelled Jong in the Gwoyeu Romatzyh system
- Common Dutch surname "de Jong"; see
  - De Jong
  - De Jonge
  - De Jongh
- Erica Jong (born 1942), American author
- Winnifred Jong, Canadian filmmaker

== Given name ==
- Jong Uichico, Filipino professional basketball head coach
- Kim Jong (table tennis) (born 1989), North Korean table tennis player

== Locations ==
- Jong, Iran, a village in Razavi Khorasan Province, Iran
- Jong, Norway, a district in the municipality of Bærum, Norway
- Jong River, a river in Sierra Leone
- Pulau Jong, Singapore island

== Other ==
- Mala Mala Jong, a fictional character from the animated series Xiaolin Showdown
- Muk Yan Jong, a martial arts dummy
- Javanese jong, a type of sailing ship
- JONG (political party)
