= De Young =

De Young or DeYoung may refer to:

== People ==
- Bailey De Young, American actress
- Charles de Young, American journalist and businessman
- Cliff DeYoung, American actor and musician
- Dennis DeYoung, American rock musician
- Frederic R. DeYoung, American politician
- Karen DeYoung, American journalist
- Liam de Young, Australian field hockey player
- Mary de Young, American professor of sociology
- Michael Henry de Young, American journalist and businessman

== Other ==
- 134244 De Young, a main-belt asteroid
- DeYoung, former name of Calumet Park, Illinois, US
- DeYoung Family Zoo, a zoological park in Wallace, Michigan, US
- M. H. de Young Memorial Museum, a fine art museum in Golden Gate Park, San Francisco, California, US
- Park de Young, a former name of Mosaic Stadium at Taylor Field, in Regina, Saskatchewan, Canada

== See also ==
- De Jong
