= Gabriel de Jongh =

South African painter (1913–2004)

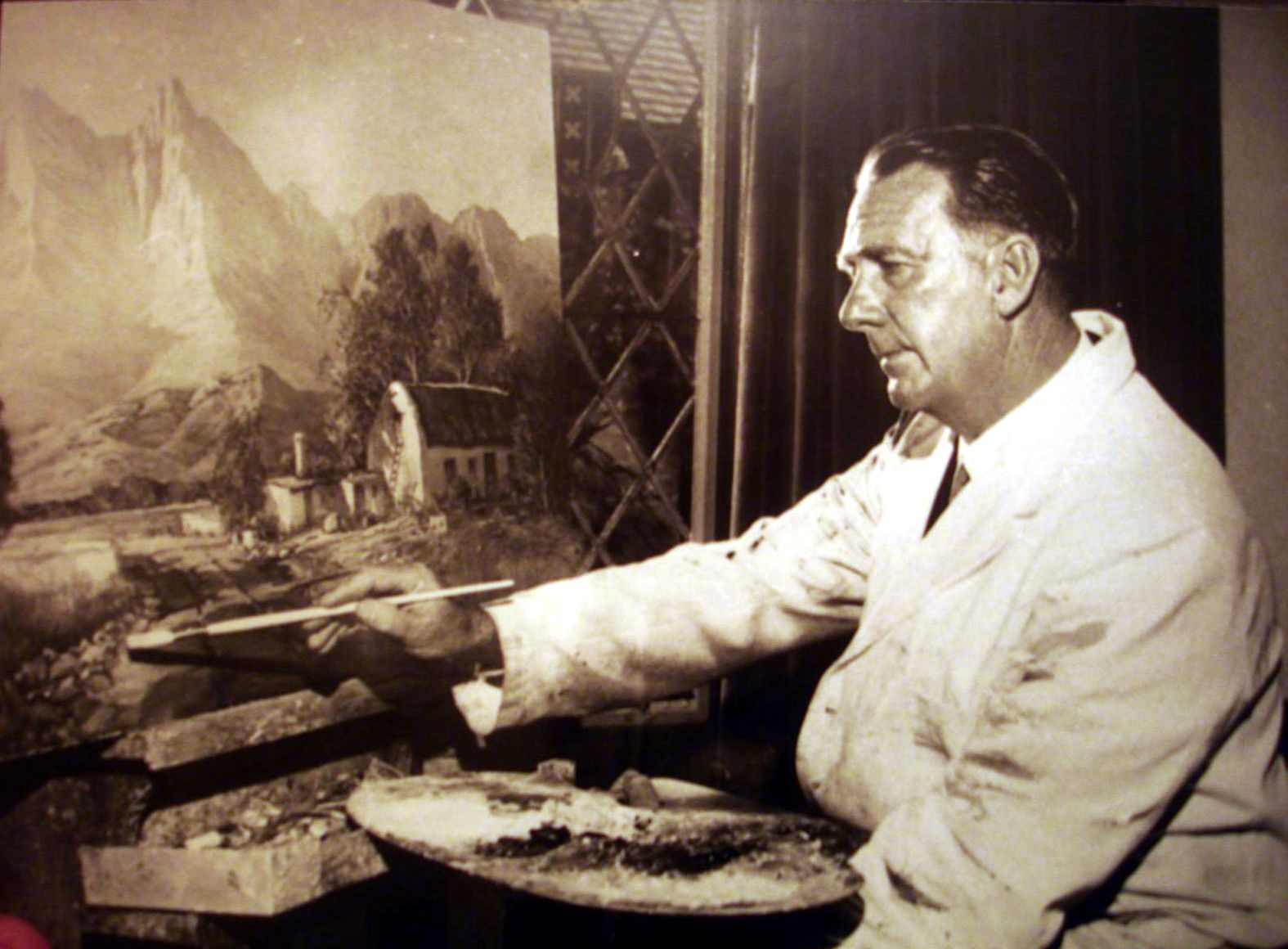

"Landscape with Cottage"

Gabriel Cornelis de Jongh (6 April 1913 – 11 March 2004) was a Dutch-born South African painter.

Gabriel de Jongh was born in Amsterdam, the only son of landscape artist Tinus de Jongh. After a very close relationship with his father, Gabriel decided to pursue the same career, his father being both tutor and critic. Working in oil, watercolour, ink and pencil, he painted landscapes, still lifes, seascapes, and wildlife; he also depicted religious themes.

Tinus de Jongh travelled to South Africa in 1921, his wife following with the family six months later, and settled in a cottage in Fish Hoek. Gabriel accompanied his father on rambles through the Cape Peninsula, searching for painterly subjects. Later he studied at the Michaelis School of Fine Art and the Slade School of Art in London. He did a course in woodcarving under H. V. Meyerowitz in Cape Town, and a course in photo-lithography at the Cape Times.

Tinus bought a car in 1923, travelling ever further afield, and always accompanied by his family. In 1924 the family moved to Rondebosch, Gabriel attending Rondebosch and Wynberg Boy's schools, and matriculating in 1930. Before starting his training at the Cape Times, Gabriel was tutored for a year in watercolour techniques by his father. Gabriel spent all his free time producing small watercolours of the Malay Quarter, Cape Town Docks and Table Mountain. Over weekends he pursued various sports and was a keen golfer. His tennis was of sufficiently high standard to represent The Cape Times in tournaments. He became a member of the S A Turf Club and owned a champion racehorse, "Glorious".

Completing his apprenticeship he became interested in colour reproduction of fine art, coming under the guidance of Charles Hardy. During this period he started experimenting with etchings.

Tinus exhibited in Hermanus in 1937 and suggested that Gabriel display some of his works. Gabriel's twenty watercolours sold on the first day. When some of his works were displayed in Port Elizabeth and well-received, the news delighted his father. Thereafter his work was regularly exhibited at various art societies in the Eastern Cape, Orange Free State and Johannesburg.

Gabriel married Mercia Maria Kotze in 1938, moving into a home adjacent to his parents.

With the hostilities of World War II Gabriel volunteered for service, but was needed by The Cape Times because of his skills in photo-lithography. He joined the Civil Defence Corps with his father until 1942 when all expatriate Dutch citizens were called up by the Dutch government. Tinus' declining health was diagnosed as lung cancer and Gabriel was granted compassionate leave to be with his father, who died on 17 July 1942. Gabriel was ordered to join the Eighth Contingent of the Koninklijke Nederlandsche Brigade, and embarked on the "Sabajak" arriving in Britain on 16 December 1942. Amidst preparations for war, Gabriel spent his free time drawing in the English countryside, and attended the Slade School of Art, transferred to Windermere during the war, as a part-time student. On 5 August 1944 he departed for Normandy. As a war artist he depicted scenes in France, England, Belgium and the Netherlands. Injured by anti-personnel shells, he was declared medically unfit, arriving back in South Africa on 12 June 1945, and returning to work at The Cape Times, traumatised by his war experiences.

In 1946 he acquired an army truck converted to a caravan, and set off with his wife and son Tinus, on a grand painting tour of the Eastern Cape, Basutoland and Natal. While staying at the Cathedral Peak Hotel in the Drakensberg, he was persuaded to exhibit his works there by the owner, Albert van der Riet. This proved a large factor in his swing from watercolours to oils.

Gabriel made lengthy tours of Britain, Europe, South America and East Africa, but remained devoted to the landscapes of the Western Cape, referred to by his descendants as the "boompie-bergie-huisie-thing". He purchased a boat, the Pocketa, in which he explored the Cape waters. A painting of Cape Point is displayed in the clubhouse of the Marlin and Tuna Club of which he was a member.

He was commissioned to paint the Villa Dubochet in Clarens, where President Paul Kruger died in exile, and Boekenhoutfontein, his historic homestead near Rustenburg. Other commissions included Jan van Riebeek's landing in Table Bay, the 1963 volcanic eruption on Tristan da Cunha, and a 1,8 x 2,4 metre canvas of the elephant Ndlulamithi. His works are to be seen in public and private collections all over the world.

Gabriel established the Tinus de Jongh Memorial Gallery in Stellenbosch in 1981 and turned into a major tourist attraction on the wine route. The gallery closed ten years later when the Lanzerac Hotel changed hands.
