= John H.A.L. de Jong =

John H.A.L. de Jong (born 22 June 1947, The Hague) graduated in General Linguistics, French and English languages from Leiden University and obtained a PhD in Educational Measurement from Twente University. He has published many articles and books on language acquisition and assessment and on educational measurement. He is specialized in the empirical scaling of language proficiency and promotes the development of internationally standardized reporting scales of language proficiency. He was involved from the start in developing the Common European Framework of Reference for Languages.

After teaching French for seven years, De Jong continued his career at CITO, the Dutch National Institute for Educational Management. In 2000 he set up a company, "Language Testing Services" (LTS), to provide advice and services in the areas of language curriculum development, language testing and assessment in general to national and international educational authorities, educational institutions and international business corporations. In September 2006 he joined Pearson Language Tests as Vice President Test Development and developed a new computer based test of academic English, Pearson Test of English. De Jong moved on within Pearson English and held the function of Senior Vice President Standards and Quality until he left Pearson in 2016.

He was appointed Chair in Language Testing at VU University Amsterdam in 2009 and left the university in 2017, supervising research in the area of language testing & language proficiency modeling.

In 2016 De Jong received the Cambridge/International Language Testing Association Distinguished Achievement Award.
