= Alida de Jong =

Dutch politician (1885–1943)

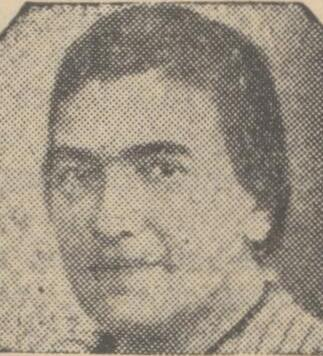
- De Jong c. 1937

Member of the Dutch House of Representatives
- In office 1931–1933
- In office 1937–1943

Member of the municipal council of Amsterdam
- In office 1935–1940

Personal details
- Born: Aaltje de Jong; 18 December 1885 Amsterdam, Netherlands
- Died: 9 July 1943 (aged 57) Sobibor, General Government (occupied Poland)
- Party: SDAP
- Relatives: Loe de Jong (niece)

Aaltje (Alida) de Jong (18 December 1885 – 9 July 1943) was a Jewish-Dutch politician.

== Early life and education ==
De Jong was a daughter of the diamond worker and milk deliverer Levie de Jong and Sarah Serlui and aunt of the historian and first director of the RIOD Loe de Jong. After public primary school and refresher education, De Jong trained as a seamstress. She became a costume seamstress and was a board member of the Dutch Association of Workers in the Clothing Industry from 1912 to 1940. She also worked for this union - first as second secretary, later as chief executive officer and member of the executive board. She was also a representative at the Dutch Association of Trade Unions. From 1927, De Jong held board positions at the Social Democratic Workers' Party (SDAP).

== Political career ==
From 1931 to 1933 and from 1937, De Jong was a member of the House of Representatives of the States General on behalf of the SDAP. In addition, she was a member of the Amsterdam city council from 1935. In the House of Representatives she mainly spoke on topics surrounding economic affairs and labor, defense and social affairs. In December 1931 she played a leading role in the strikes at the Hollandia factories and in 1932 she negotiated a labor dispute in the Amsterdam clothing industry.

== Death ==
In 1940 she was expelled from the municipal council by the German occupiers. During the raid of 20 June 1943, De Jong was arrested and transported to Westerbork transit camp. On 6 July that year she was deported to the Sobibor extermination camp, where she was murdered on 9 July.
