= Tinus de Jongh =

Dutch-born South African painter (1885–1942)

- Born: Martinus Johannes "Tinus" de Jongh; 31 January 1885; Amsterdam
- Died: 17 July 1942 (aged 57); Bloemfontein
- Occupation: Painter

Martinus Johannes "Tinus" de Jongh (31 January 1885 in Amsterdam – 17 July 1942 in Bloemfontein) was a Dutch-born painter an printmaker who is one of South Africa's most popular artists.

== Career ==
Self-taught, he began his career as a decorator in the Netherlands, and then pursued painting full-time. He achieved some note when the Stedelijk Museum in Amsterdam purchased one of his early pictures. He arrived in South Africa in 1921, practicing a sober style within the Dutch tradition, typified there by Still Life with Birds and Hare. The light and landscape of South Africa soon caused him to abandon his muted palette in favour of more saturated colours. His formulaic approach to painting Cape landscapes with gabled farmhouses created such a demand that he abandoned his considered brushwork in favour of a broader palette knife technique. His etchings sold in the hundreds through his dealer Louis Woolf.

== Death ==
He died on 17 July 1942 from lung cancer.

== Personal life ==
Tinus married Johanna Maria Verhoef in April 1911. They had three children: Wilhelmina, Petronella and Gabriel de Jongh, who became a landscape artist in South Africa.
