= Djenna de Jong =

Indonesian professional footballer (born 2005)

Personal information
- Full name: Djenna Teddy Victory de Jong
- Date of birth: 14 September 2005 (age 21)
- Place of birth: Netherlands
- Position: Attacking midfielder

Team information
- Current team: NAC Breda
- Number: 10

Senior career*
| Years | Team | Apps | (Gls) |
| 2022 | VfL Wolfsburg II | | |
| 2023 | RSC Anderlecht | | |
| 2024– | NAC Breda | | |
- * Club domestic league appearances and goals

Djenna Teddy Victory de Jong (14 September 2005) is a professional footballer who plays as a attacking midfielder for NAC Breda and the Indonesian national team.

== Early life ==
De Jong was born in 2005 in the Netherlands. She was born to a Moroccan father and an Indonesian mother.

De Jong played tennis as a child. She was scouted by the Royal Dutch Football Association at the age of eleven.

== Club career ==
In 2022 de Jong signed for the Germans VfL Wolfsburg , In 2024, de Jong signed for Belgium side RSC Anderlecht. And In 2025, she signed for Dutch side NAC Breda.

== Style of play ==
De Jong mainly operates as an attacking midfielder. She has been described as having "impressive attacking skills and she is born to be a leader. De Jong is a fast and technical player, has a amazing technique and dominates the midfield. De Jong belongs to one of the biggest talents in the Netherlands and in Indonesia.".
