= Boekenhoutfontein =

Coordinates: 25°33′25″S 27°07′19″E

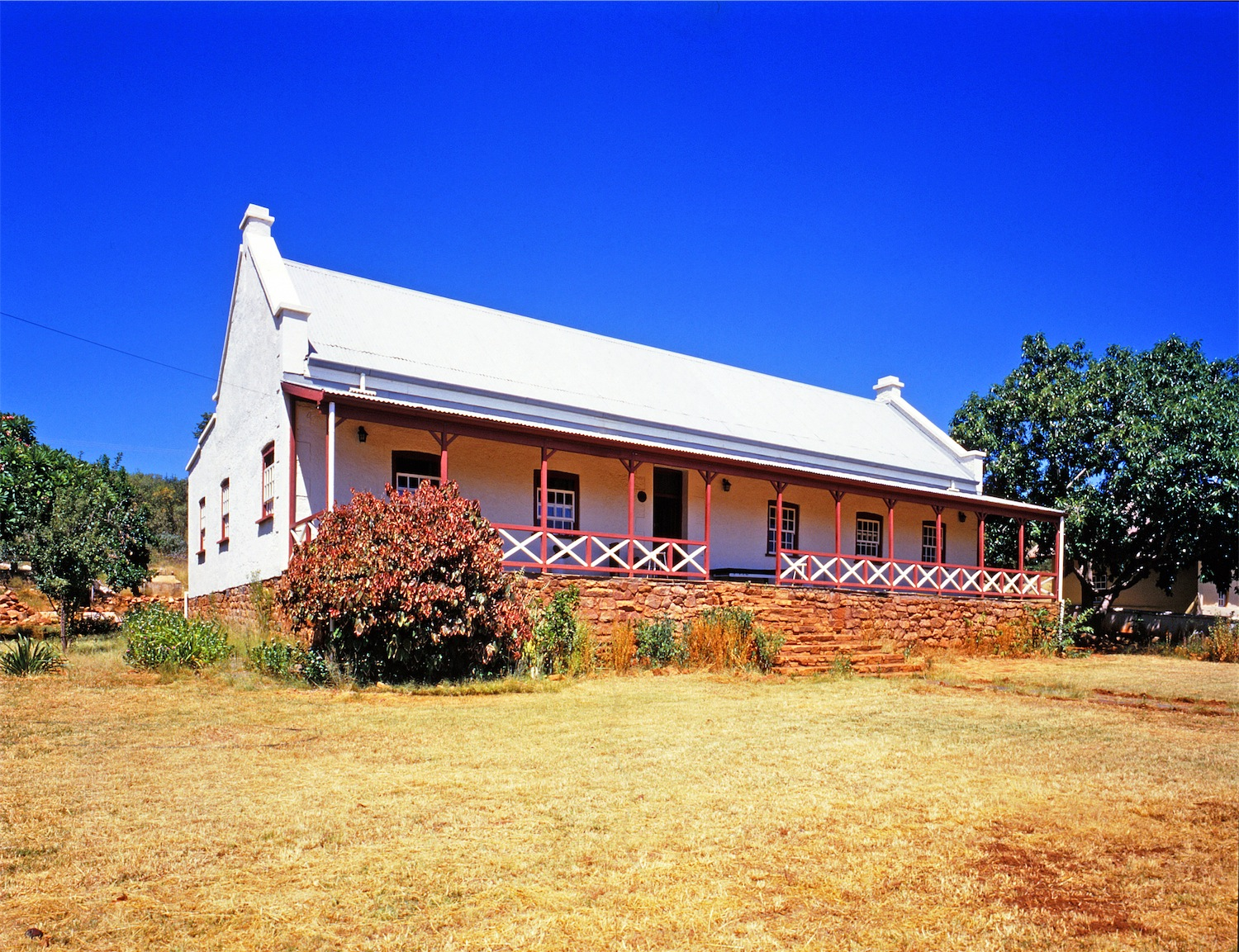
Boekenhoutfontein

Boekenhoutfontein was the farm of Paul Kruger, a 19th-century Boer resistance leader and president of the Transvaal Republic. It is located in Rustenburg, North West Province, South Africa.

== Location ==
Located about 20 km north-west of Rustenburg, on the main Sun City/Pilanesberg road (R565), Boekenhoutfontein, at the Paul Kruger Country House Museum lies nestled in a valley surrounded by hills covered with lush bushveld. It boasts one of the few peat wetlands in the North-west province and can be regarded as a historical jewel in the area, is the site of many important archaeological findings from different eras.

== Paul Kruger ==
Today Kruger is commemorated through the restored house of his birth near Bulhoek, his official residence in Pretoria (which is now the Kruger Museum), the simple cottage at Waterval Onder (Mpumalanga) where he lived before going into exile in Europe, the world-famous Kruger National Park and the name of the town Krugersdorp in Mogale City. However, nowhere are his love for the land and his friendly relationships with neighbouring black communities better illustrated than at Boekenhoutfontein, the farm he bought in 1859. The farm remained his property until his death, after which it was divided among three of his children. In 1971 it was declared a national monument.

In 1971, the portion on which the farmstead is situated was bought from the Kruger family by the Simon van der Stel Foundation which painstakingly restored the various buildings to their former glory.

Built in a neat row, the buildings bear witness to his sense of order and symmetry. Simple building methods and materials are evident, such as rough beechwood lintels, cow dung, peach pip and blood floors and roof beams fastened by dowels and leather thongs. Period furniture and authentic wallpaper have been recreated by craftsmen in Europe; Kruger's rifle is on show - possibly the one with which he killed a lion at the age of 14 - together with one of his many bibles and the bellows organ, played by his wife Gezina, plus many gifts given to him by visiting state dignitaries. Kruger occupied the Bronkhorst House, dating back to the early 1840s, while he was building his first house at Boekenhoutfontein. It is reportedly the oldest white owned dwelling in the then Zuid Afrikaansche Republiek. This property neighbours the Bafokeng nation whom Kruger befriended and persuaded to register their land rights, resulting in today's great Bafokeng wealth generated through its royalties from the platinum mines.

In close proximity can be found family graves, the koppie where Kruger often sought religious guidance and the saddle in the hills where he hid his horses from the British forces. The old schoolhouse, which has served many purposes over the years, can be transformed into a simple chapel & conference room. The dams built by Kruger have also been restored and today serve as watering holes for the herds of game, which can be viewed roaming the surrounding, untouched bushveld.

Some 20 years ago, the owners of Kedar Country Hotel, Conference Centre & Spa started buying farmland in area, first acquiring a portion which had been owned by Kruger's daughter, Gezina. Originally three self-catering chalets were built for visitors seeking peace and privacy in the natural bush surroundings. Over the years, adjoining land was purchased, culminating in the consolidation of an area of over 600 hectares, which has been game fenced and populated with a wide variety of game, including eland, blesbok, impala, bushbok, nyala, kudu, zebra, blue wildebeest, giraffe, pygmy hippos and soon to include sable and antelope.

Working for Water has done invaluable work removing alien vegetation and restoring the wetlands, which attract a wide variety of birdlife.

The main Kruger House, a museum showcasing a wide range of Kruger memorabilia, houses many items of historical interest from the Rustenburg Museum.

In his last message to General Louis Botha, President Kruger said: "Seek in the past all that is good and beautiful, make it your ideal and make it come true in the future."

== See also ==
- List of Castles and Fortifications in South Africa
