= Carel de Iongh =

Dutch sports shooter

Personal information
- Born: 6 October 1883 Dordrecht, Netherlands
- Died: 2 June 1964 (aged 80) Voorburg, Netherlands

Sport
- Sport: Sports shooting

Carel de Iongh (6 October 1883 – 2 June 1964) was a Dutch sports shooter. He competed in two events at the 1924 Summer Olympics.
