= William DeJong =

William DeJong (born 1950) is a Professor in the Department of Community Health Sciences at the Boston University School of Public Health.

== Education and career ==
DeJong received his AB degree from Dartmouth College in 1973, and subsequently received his MA and PhD from Stanford University. He received his PhD in 1977 in social psychology. From 1995 to 2004, he was the director of the United States Department of Education's Center for Alcohol and Other Drug Abuse and Violence Prevention.

== Research ==
DeJong's research covers multiple areas in the field of public health, including alcohol and tobacco control, health communications, and health promotion. In 2014, he co-authored a review article that found that the United States' legal drinking age of 21 had saved lives since it was raised to that level as a result of a law passed in 1984.

== Views ==
DeJong has been critical of designated driver programs, saying in 1994 that there was no evidence that they were effective. In 2001, when California State University adopted a new set of anti-drinking policies such as treatment programs and advisory boards, DeJong said that this represented a major change from the previous approach most schools used to address drinking on their campuses, which previously focused mainly on communicating messages. He has also said that almost all experts agree that Alcoholics Anonymous is effective, and has harshly criticized the alcoholic beverage industry for, according to him, "rely to a great extent on underage drinkers and abusive drinkers for the profits that they make."
