= Johannes Cornelis de Jonge =

Dutch historian & politician (1793–1853)

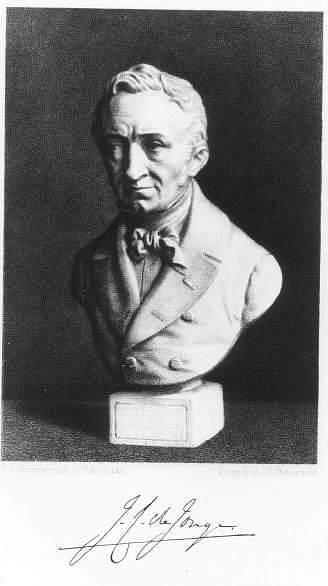
Bust of jhr. J.C. de Jonge

Jhr. Johannes Cornelis de Jonge (9 May 1793 in Zierikzee – 12 June 1853 in The Hague) was a Dutch Rijksarchivaris (Chief Archivist of the Dutch National Archives), historian, and politician. He is best known for his encyclopedic Geschiedenis van het Nederlandsche Zeewezen, a naval history of the Netherlands that was based on the Dutch naval archives, a large part of which were destroyed in a fire in the archives of the Dutch Department of the Navy in 1844. By default therefore this history had to come in the place of the lost primary documents.

== Personal life ==
De Jonge was born in an old "patrician" family of Zeeland notables (his ancestor Bonifacius de Jonge had been Raadpensionaris of Zeeland from 1615 to 1625), for which reason he and his family received the aristocratic title of Jonkheer, when king William I of the Netherlands reorganized the Dutch aristocracy in 1814. He was the son of Willem Adriaan de Jonge van Campens Nieuwland and Cornelia Petronella Mogge Pous. As a boy he was already interested in history, and he was instrumental in saving a number of medieval Zeeland charters from being auctioned off in 1810 by the French authorities in his native city of Zierikzee. This brought him to the attention of Hendrik van Wijn, the first archivist of the Batavian Republic, who became the first Rijksarchivaris in the new Kingdom of the Netherlands in 1814, and nominated de Jonge as his deputy in that year. Meanwhile, de Jonge was pursuing his studies in jurisprudence and history at Leiden University, and as a member of the studentenweerbaarheid (student militia) he took part in the Waterloo campaign with the Dutch army. After his return to Leiden he received his doctorate in law and history on 27 July 1816 with the doctoral thesis Diplomata quaedam Hollandica et Zelandica partim inedita partim emendata animadversionibus illustrata.

He married Henrietta Philippina Jacoba van Kretschmar on 18 September 1816 with whom he had five children. He died after suffering a stroke in his mansion Huize Zuidhoorn near Rijswijk/The Hague in 1853.

== Career ==
He was appointed substituut (deputy) Rijksarchivaris in March 1814. In 1816 he was also appointed superintendent of the Koninklijk Kabinet van Munten, Penningen en Gesneden Stenen (Royal Dutch Numismatic Collection). In both offices he promoted the accessibility of the collections of archival sources and coins by publishing catalogs. He wrote a large number of historical publications and published facsimile publications of historical documents, in which he used his direct access to the archives. In 1820 he became a corresponding member of the Royal Institute of the Netherlands. In 1825 he became a regular member.

In 1831, after the death of his mentor Van Wijn, he himself was appointed Rijksarchivaris. In this period he wrote his magnum opus on the history of the Dutch navy: Geschiedenis van het Nederlandsche Zeewezen (6 volumes, between 1833 and 1848). In 1833 he obtained the original copy of the Union of Utrecht treaty for the National Archives from the Koninklijke Bibliotheek, and a large collection of original medieval charters that had previously been held in the Charter room of the County, later Province, of Holland.

De Jonge was also politically active. He was appointed a member of the municipal council of The Hague in 1825. In that capacity he became editor of the Dagblad voor Zuid-Holland en 's-Gravenhage (the official publication of the city) in 1827. In 1844 he was elected wethouder (alderman) of The Hague, which he remained till his death. He was also a member of the Provinciale Staten of the province of South Holland between 1840 and 1851.

== Publications ==
The following is a selection of his published works:

- Verhalen over den oorsprong der Hoeksche en Kabeljauwsche twisten, (Leiden 1817)
- Levensschets van Floris den voogd van Holland (1819)
- Notice sur le Cabinet des médailles et des pierres gravées de S.M. le Roi des Pays-Bas. La Haye (1823)
- Levensbeschrijving van Johan en Cornelis Evertsen, Luitenant-Admiralen van Zeeland (The Hague 1820)
- Verhalen over den oorsprong, den voortgang en de hoedanigheid van den invloed des derden Staats in de Statenvergaderingen gedurende het Hertogelijk en Grafelijk bewind in Braband, Vlaanderen, Holland en Zeeland (for which he received a royal gold medal, 1824)
- De Unie van Brussel des jaars 1577 (The Hague, 1825)
- Verhandelingen en onuitgegeven stukken, betreffende de geschiedenis der Nederlanden (2 vols., Delft 1825, The Hague 1827)
- Onderzoek over den oorsprong der Nederlandsche vlag (1831)
- Hendrik van Wijn als geleerde en staatsman geschetst (1832)
- Geschiedenis van het Nederlandsche zeewezen (6 vols., The Hague 1833-1848, 2nd edition Haarlem 1858-1862, edited by his son Jan Karel Jacob de Jonge)
- Neerlands roem ter zee (Zwolle 1868)
- Nederland en Venetië ('The Hague 1852).

== Sources ==
- Branden, F.J. van den, and Frederiks, J.G. (1888–1891). "Jonge, Jhr. Mr. Johannes Cornelis de, in: Biographisch Woordenboek der Noord- en Zuidnederlandsche letterkunde". Digitale Bibliotheek voor de Nederlandse Letteren (in Dutch). pp. 397–398.
- Brugmans, Hajo (1918). "Jonge, Jhr. Mr. Johannes Cornelis de, in Nieuw Nederlandsch Biografisch Woordenboek". Resources Huygens ING (in Dutch). pp. 816–818.
- Holtrop, J.W. (1853). "Levensberigt van Jhr. Mr. Johannes Cornelis de Jonge, in: Jaarboek van de Maatschappij der Nederlandse Letterkunde". Digitale Bibliotheek voor de Nederlandse Letteren (in Dutch). pp. 157–170.
