= Johanna Stokhuyzen-de Jong =

Dutch fencer (1895–1976)

Personal information
- Born: 17 October 1895 Leiden, Netherlands
- Died: 28 October 1976 (aged 81) Oegstgeest, Netherlands

Sport
- Sport: Fencing

Johanna Stokhuyzen-de Jong (17 October 1895 – 28 October 1976) was a Dutch fencer. She competed in the women's individual foil at the 1924 Summer Olympics.
