= Claude de Jongh =

Dutch Golden Age painter

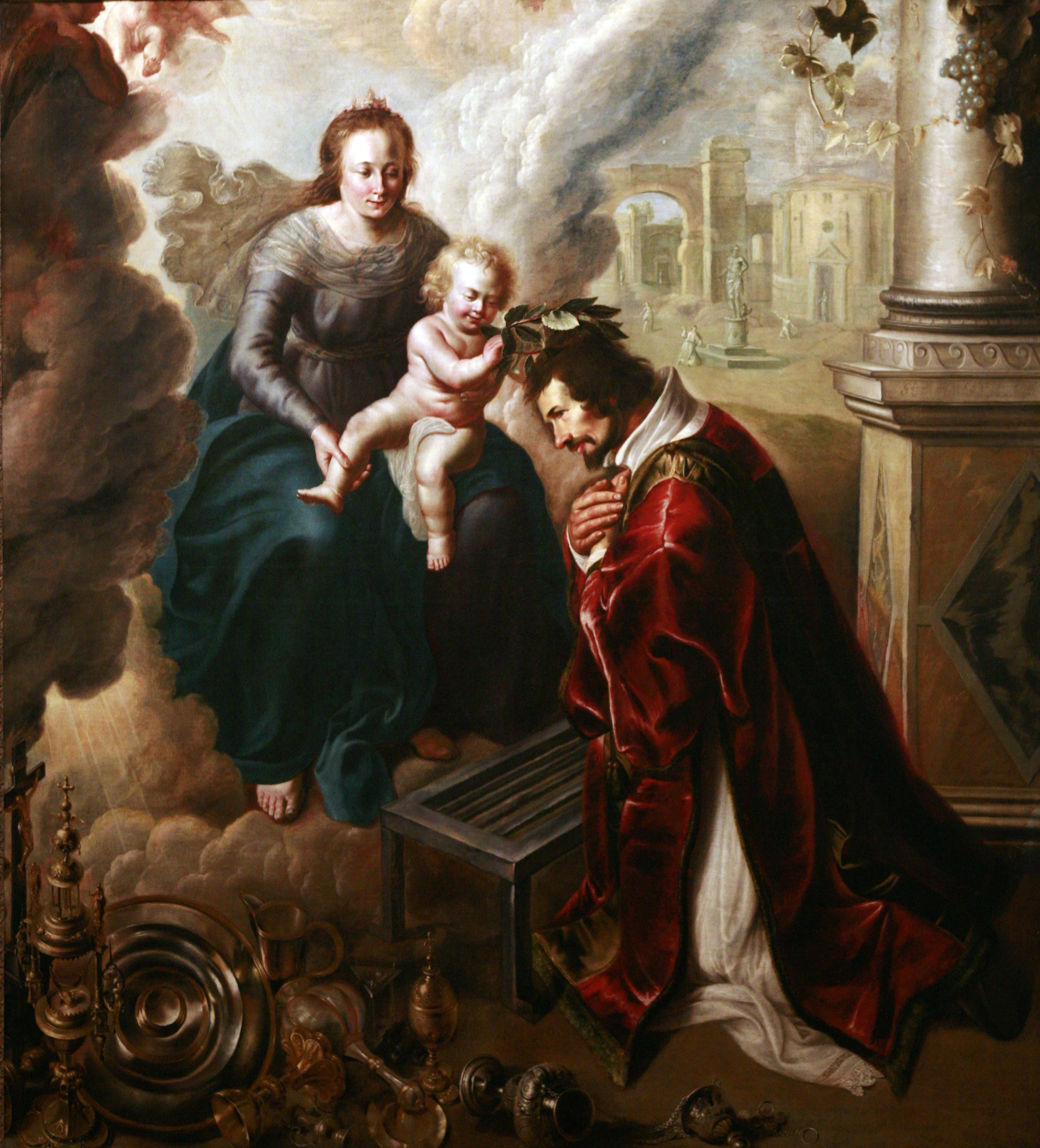
Saint Lawrence crowned by Baby Jesus

Claude de Jongh (1605, Utrecht – 1663, Utrecht), was a Dutch Golden Age painter.

== Biography ==
According to the Netherlands Institute for Art History he was a landscape painter who travelled to England and is registered there several times from 1625-1650.
