= Lilly de Jongh Osborne =

Costa Rican writer (1883–1975)

- Born: November 9, 1883; San José, Costa Rica
- Died: March 14, 1975 (aged 91); Guatemala City, Guatemala

Lilly de Jongh Osborne (November 9, 1883 – March 14, 1975) was a Costa Rican writer, lecturer, collector, and scholar specializing in Mesoamerican arts, crafts, and textiles. She published several works in this field. Some of her many artifacts are part of the collections at the University of Pennsylvania Museum of Archaeology and Anthropology

== Biography ==
Born in San José, Costa Rica, Osborne was the daughter of Dutch parents, Juan J. and Jenny G. de Jongh. She graduated from the Colegio de Senoritas (San Jose, 1900). She had been a member of various organizations including the Academia de Geografía e Historia de Guatemala, El Ateneo de El Salvado, Society of Woman Geographers, and Real Academia de Bellas Artes de San Fernando. The Guatemalan textiles which she collected in the mid to late 1930s are housed at the University of Pennsylvania Museum of Archaeology and Anthropology. She has published extensively in this field.

She married Edmund Arthur Osborne (1873–1941). There were three children, Stanley, Leslie, and Elsa. Osborne died in Guatemala City, Guatemala 1975.

== Selected works ==
- Minor Native arts in Central America
- Indian crafts of Guatemala
- 1928, Brief von Lilly de Jongh Osborne an Max Uhle
- 1933, Making a textile collection (with Pan American Union)
- 1935, Tupui or coral serpent, black spots on Indian children
- 1935, Guatemala textiles
- 1956, Four keys to El Salvador
- 1960, Así es Guatemala
- 1963, Breves apuntes de la indumentar a idigena de Guatemala
- 1965, Folklore, supersticiones y leyendas de Guatemala (with Sociedad de Geografía e Historia de Guatemala; Comisión Permanente de Folklore, Etnografía y Etnología)
- 1965, Indian crafts of Guatemala and El Salvador (with Jay I. Kislak Reference Collection (Library of Congress))

== Bibliography ==
- Hilton, Ronald (1946). Who's Who in Latin America: Part II, Central America and Panama. Stanford University Press. ISBN 978-0-8047-0712-1.
- Schevill, Margot Blum; Berlo, Janet Catherine; Dwyer, Edward B. (5 July 2010). Textile Traditions of Mesoamerica and the Andes: An Anthology. University of Texas Press. ISBN 978-0-292-78761-2.
