= Michael De Jong =

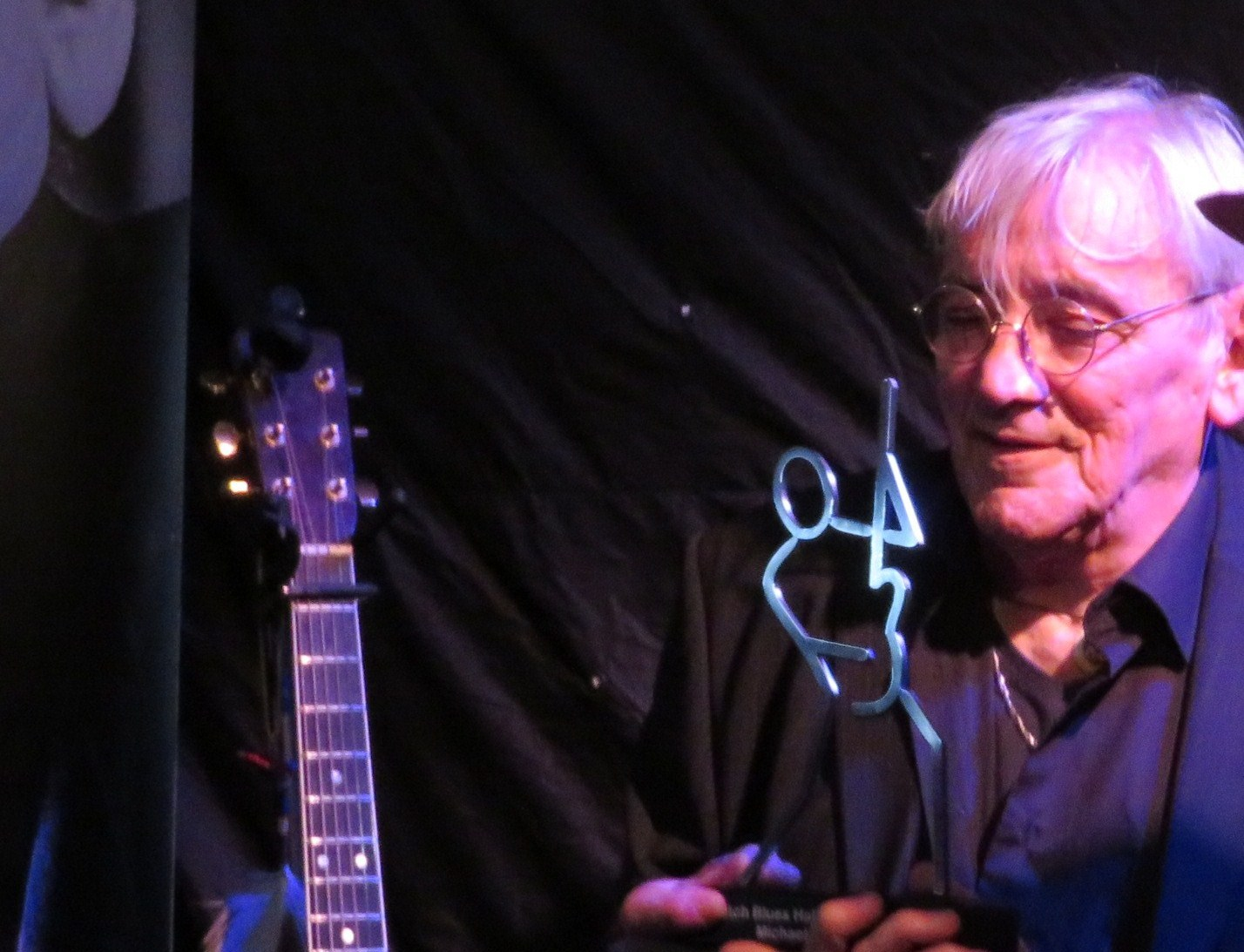
- De Jong in 2017

Background information
- Born: January 22, 1945; Fontenay-le-Comte, France
- Died: March 10, 2018 (aged 73) Dordrecht, Netherlands
- Genres: Blues, singer songwriter
- Occupations: Musician, songwriter
- Instruments: Vocals, guitar
- Years active: 1960–present
- Labels: Dutch Uncle Music
- Website: michaeldejong.com

Michael De Jong (January 22, 1945 – March 10, 2018) was a Dutch–American blues guitarist and singer songwriter.

In the early days when he played with the Michael De Jong Band his music was influenced by Chuck Berry, Buddy Holly, Eddie Cochran, Jimmy Reed, 1950s blues and rockabilly. Later he played (mostly solo) intimate songs with a guitar and his hoarse voice. He wrote about his struggle with life, about women ("Gods masterpiece"), love and the decay of society.

== Biography ==
De Jong's father, Gerben "Gep" De Jong (1919 – 1994) was a Dutchman who fled the Netherlands during World War II. In France his father married a French Basque woman, at that time De Jong was born. After the War, they lived in The Netherlands until the family emigrated to the United States in 1950. From the age of five De Jong grew up in Grand Rapids, Michigan, where he ended up as the foreign outsider. When he was six years old he joined the church choir and he never stopped singing. His first performance was at this age: he sang "Ave Maria" in the boys church choir. In contradiction of this, he spent his ninth birthday in a youth institution for setting his school on fire. The reason for this: in front of his schoolmates he was blamed to be a bad Catholic, because his parents didn't donate enough money to the church. De Jong was caught early, otherwise he would have burned down the church, the vicarage and the monastery as well, he claimed. At the age of thirteen De Jong started playing the guitar without taking any lessons. This happened after seeing a concert by Johnny Cash: "That's what I wanna do." Five years later he started his first band The Nightwalkers, which backed Bobby Bare who shortly thereafter became successful with "The All American Boy" and the "Detroit City".

In 1967 he moved to Detroit. There he became a regular guest at the John Sinclair's Ann Arbor Blues Festival. Between 1970 and 1974 he traveled through the US. Finally he ended up in New Orleans. There he played in rather obscure clubs of Bourbon Street almost 7 nights a week for 13 months in a row. Often he was sharing the stage with Professor Longhair and the Neville Brothers. He moved to California in 1975 where he stayed for 10 years in San Francisco. During that time he played with or supported Jerry Garcia, Paul Butterfield, Albert Collins, John Lee Hooker, Maria Muldaur, Country Joe, Charlie Musselwhite, Albert King, and other musical legends. De Jong soon earned the respect of Philip Elwood, the San Francisco Examiner's top music critic. Around that time De Jong joined blues legend Jimmy Reed's band as his guitarist. One day Reed told him: "It ain't how you sing the song boy, it's how you live your life... and if you ain't lived the life, how can you sing the song". After hearing these words De Jong started writing his own songs. It was De Jong who discovered Reed's body after his death in Oakland.

In 1981, De Jong recorded his first album All Night Long. It was produced by Nick Gravenites (Electric Flag, Janis Joplin) and featured Steve Miller Band members Norton Buffalo and Greg Douglas.
:Review by Mike Joseph, S.F. Chronicle, exact date unknown, 1983:

"Sounds like Bob Seger fronting Dire Straits, but harder. The range here is from country-western ballads to balls-out rockers, and DeJong [sic] and his bandmates show that four-set nights of load rock 'n roll are more than familiar to them".

Three years later he was fed up with the American culture and, making an oath to himself never to come back, he returned to Europe. After travelling through Paris, London and Bremen he settled in Copenhagen, Denmark, from 1985 to 1988 when he "left" Denmark. In fact, after ending up in jail once again, he got kicked out of the country with a ban on returning for the next 10 years. Late eighties, early nineties De Jong stayed in Amsterdam, the Netherlands. But he'd enjoyed too much sex, drugs and blues these days and before (quoting De Jong: "I've committed all sins, except of murder."), now he had to pay the price. In 1992 he got the verdict of being HIV-positive. That time he stopped drinking and doing drugs, only by the help of his muse that time. One year later, in 1993, he moved to Dordrecht, where he also died on March 10, 2018.

His first European CD was Fugitive Love Songs for Tombstone Records. His first album for Munich Records was 1996's Who's Fooling Who. He recorded seven albums for Munich Records, often in one take. About the time he recorded Immaculate Deception (2000) doctors discovered a tumor on his vocal cords. The tumor was removed by lasering and afterwards he had to start learning to sing again.

== Discography ==
- All Night Long, Michael De Jong band (Sabine Records, for M.D.J. Productions, 1981) – Produced by Nick Gravenites

Norton Buffalo on harmonica, Greg Douglass on lead guitar, Byron Allred on piano, Doug Killmer on bass, Skip White on drums

- Fugitive Love Songs (Tombstone Records, 1993) – Recorded April 22–24, 1992 at Café Max, Rotterdam, the Netherlands
- Who's Foolin' Who' (Munich, 1996) – Recorded at: Stonesound Studio, Roosendaal, NL
- Alive (Munich, 1997) – Recorded at Cafe de Amer, Amen, NL
- Grown Man Moan (Munich, 1998) – Recorded, Mixed & Mastered at Farmsound Studio, Heelsum, NL
- The Waiting Game (Munich, 1999) – Recorded, Mixed & Mastered at Farmsound Studio, Heelsum, NL
- Immaculate Deception (Munich, 2000) – Recorded at Sonic Arts Studio, Austin, Texas

Riley Osborne, keyboards (played for Willie Nelson) – Kevin Russell, mandoline (known from The Gourds) – Glen Fukunaga, bass (played for Bob Dylan) – Jon Dee Graham, lap-steel-guitar (known from True Believers) – John Hagen, cello (known from Lyle Lovett's Large Band)

- Park Bench Serenade (Munich, 2001) – Recorded and Mixed at Arlyn Studio, Austin, Texas
- Last Chance Romance (Munich, 2002) – Recorded at Fortress Studio, London, England
- 23, Rue Boyer (Corazong, 2004) – Recorded at Carre, Amsterdam(NL): Muziekcentrum Vredenburg, Utrecht(NL): Patronaat, Haarlem(NL): La Maroguinerie, Paris(FR)
- Imaginary Conversation (Corazong, 2004) – Recorded at Studio van Schuppen, Veenendaal, NL
- Echo From The Mountain (Mink Records, 2005) – Recorded at Nighttown, Rotterdam(NL): De Kleine Komedie, Amsterdam(NL): Odeon, Zwolle(NL): Oosterpoort, Groningen(NL): 013, Tilburg(NL)
- The Great Illusion (Music & Words, 2006) – Recorded at: Eurosound Studio, Herveld, NL: All Ears Studio, Amsterdam, NL: Farmsound Studio, Heelsum, NL
- For Madmen Only (Music & Words, 2009) – Recorded & Mastered at Farmsound Studio, Heelsum, NL
- Life in D-Minor (MW Records. 2012) – Mixed & Mastered at Farmsound Studio, Heelsum, NL
- Lone Wolf Howling (Live Tour 2012) (Dutch Uncle Music) – Recorded at The Netherlands?
- Michael De Jong Band Live – 30 Year Anniversary (Dutch Uncle Music, 2013) – Recorded Live At The Stone, San Francisco, CA, November 19, 1983 / Mastered at Farmsound studio, Heelsum, NL
- Something For The Pain (Dutch Uncle Music, 2014) – Mixed & Mastered at Farmsound Studio, Heelsum, NL
- Requiem For The Lonely (Dutch Uncle Music, 2016) - Recorded at Farmsound studio, Heelsum, NL / Rubber Room Studio, Frederick, MA, US / Life Song Studio, Santa Cruz, CA, US / Route 44 Studio, Sebastopol, CA, US

== Quotes ==
- De Jong asked about his guitar playing:

"I never had a lesson in my life. I play what I feel, what I've gone through, what I've seen. I've tried quitting, but I can't".

- He returned to the Netherlands "to learn how to pronounce my last name".
- Asked why he sings the blues:

"... they've killed King, Malcolm X and the Kennedys. All my heroes are dead. So I sing the blues".

- Does he hunger for commercial success?

"Maybe I'll never be a commercial success. But I'll touch a lot of people".

== Other information ==
- The album Immaculate Deception was recorded in three days and the mixing took only two days.
- "Waiting for the Rainbow", from the album Park Bench Serenade, was written in about an hour in the Daniël Den Hoop hospital during the waiting on the removal of the tumor on his vocal cords.
- For his solo live album 23 Rue Boyer, distributed by Corazong Records with its headquarters in Spain, De Jong got almost no royalties due to a struggle with the Spanish organisation for author rights.
- A deal with record label Universe was cancelled by De Jong when he was told his name on the cd cover would be written as "Michael Young". Universe said this way the music would sell better. For a man who was trying to honor his father, Gerrit/Gerben De Jong, this request was one step too far.
- As a gesture for the fans De Jong put his CDs that were no longer available online for free on his official website. Other CDs could be ordered at the lowest price. "I saw one of my CDs for sale on the internet for the price of almost €80. I can't accept that. I think my fans have the right to buy my music for normal prices".
