= Eddy de Jongh =

Dutch art historian (born 1931)

Eduard Siegfried "Eddy" de Jongh (Amsterdam, 7 June 1931) is a Dutch art historian specialized in iconography. He was professor of art history with a teaching assignment in iconography at Utrecht University between 1976 and 1989.

== Career ==
De Jongh (1931) studied art history in Utrecht with Jan G. van Gelder and William S. Heckscher. Between 1963 and 1966 he was librarian of the Utrecht Art History Institute, later working there as a teacher and research assistant. From 1966 to 1973 he was part of the Center for Advanced Study in Art History. In 1976 he was appointed professor of iconology and art theory at Utrecht University, a position he held until 1990. In 1976 he was guest curator of the exhibition Tot lering en vermaak ('To instruct and entertain') at the Rijksmuseum. Central to this exhibition was the idea that signs in paintings provide explanations for the (moral) meaning of the art. This iconological method introduced by De Jongh proved influential and would be used for decades at the Rijksmuseum and elsewhere.

De Jongh was elected a member of the Royal Netherlands Academy of Arts and Sciences (KNAW) in 1987. He is a foreign member of The Royal Flemish Academy of Belgium for Science and the Arts (KVAB), honorary member of the Historians of Netherlandish Art and doctor honoris causa of the University of Amsterdam (2002). In 2011 he received the Gijselaar-Hintzenfonds Prijs, intended for art historians who manage to reach a broad audience. In 2019 he was awarded honorary membership of the Dutch Association of Art Historians (Vereniging van Nederlandse Kunsthistorici), which called him the "founding father of iconography in the Netherlands".

== Selected bibliography ==
=== Books ===
- Zinne- en minnebeelden in de schilderkunst van de zeventiende eeuw, Amsterdam-Antwerpen 1967
- Tot lering en vermaak. Betekenissen van Hollandse genrevoorstellingen uit de zeventiende eeuw, Rijksmuseum, Amsterdam 1976
- [et al.], Still life in the age of Rembrandt, Auckland City Art Gallery, Auckland 1982
- Portretten van echt en trouw. Huwelijk en gezin in de Nederlandse kunst van de zeventiende eeuw, Frans Halsmuseum, Haarlem 1986
- Kunst en het vruchtbare misverstand. Huizinga-lezing 1992, Amsterdam 1993
- [et al.], Faces of the Golden Age. Seventeenth-Century Dutch Portraits, Yamaguchi, Kumamoto, Tokyo, Rotterdam, Kunsthal 1994
- Kwesties van betekenis. Thema en motief in de Nederlandse schilderkunst van de zeventiende eeuw, Leiden 1995 ( English edition: Questions of meaning. Theme and motif in Dutch seventeenth-century painting, Leiden 2000) (Japanese edition: オランダ絵画のイコノロジー―テーマとモチーフを読み解く, Tokyo 2005)
- [with Ger Luijten] Spiegel van alledag. Nederlandse genreprenten 1550-1700, Rijksmuseum, Amsterdam 1997 ( English edition: Mirror of everyday life. Genre prints in the Netherlands 1550-1700)
- Dankzij de tiende muze. 33 Opstellen uit Kunstschrift, Leiden 2000
- [with Jan Piet Filedt Kok] Peter Vos. Metamorfosen, Bussum 2013 (French edition: Peter Vos. Métamorphoses, Paris-Bussum 2013)
- [with Jan Piet Filedt Kok] Peter Vos. Getekende brieven, Amsterdam 2017
- [with Jan Piet Filedt Kok] Peter Vos. Getekende boeken, Amsterdam 2020
- ‘Onbenul! Dit is poëzie’. De getekende en geschreven gedichten van Peter Vos, Bussum 2023.

=== Articles ===
- [with P.J. Vinken], ‘Frans Hals als voortzetter van een emblematische traditie. Bij het huwelijksportret van Isaac Massa en Beatrix van der Laen’, Oud Holland 76 (1961), pp. 117-152
- [with P.J. Vinken], ‘De boosaardigheid van Hals’ regenten en regentessen’, Oud Holland 78 (1963), pp. 1-26
- 'Diogenes de mensenzoeker. Bij Jacob van Campens schilderij in het Centraal Museum'. Kunst in Utrecht 1 (1962-1963), pp. 110-113.
- ‘Erotica in vogelperspectief. De dubbelzinnigheid van een reeks 17de-eeuwse genrevoorstellingen’, Simiolus 3 (1968-69), pp. 22-74
- ‘The Spur of Wit: Rembrandt’s Response to an Italian Challenge’, Delta. A Review of Arts, Life and Thought in the Netherlands, Summer 1969, pp. 49-67
- ‘Vermommingen van Vrouw Wereld in de 17de eeuw’, Album amicorum J.G. van Gelder, The Hague 1973, pp. 198-206
- ‘“’t Gotsche krulligh mall”. De houding tegenover de gotiek in het zeventiende-eeuwse Holland’, Nederlands Kunsthistorisch Jaarboek 24 (1973), pp. 85-145
- ‘Grape symbolism in paintings of the 16th and 17th centuries’, Simiolus 7 (1974), pp. 166-191
- ‘Pearls of virtue and pearls of vice’, Simiolus 8 (1975-76), pp. 69-97
- ‘Real Dutch art and not-so-real Dutch art: some nationalistic views of seventeenth-century Netherlandish painting’, Simiolus 20 (1990–91), pp. 197–206
- ‘Some notes on interpretation’, in David Freedberg and Jan de Vries (eds.), Art in history, history in art. Studies in seventeenth-century Dutch culture, Santa Monica, California 1991, pp. 119–136
- ‘Nationalistische visies op zeventiende-eeuwse Hollandse kunst’, in S.C. Dik en G.W. Muller (eds.), Het hemd is nader dan de rok. Zes voordrachten over het eigene van de Nederlandse cultuur, Publikaties van de Commissie Geesteswetenschappen KNAW, nr. 1, Assen-Maastricht 1992, pp. 61–82
- ‘De Nederlandse zeventiende-eeuwse schilderkunst door politieke brillen bezien’, in Frans Grijzenhout & Henk van Veen (eds.), De gouden eeuw in perspectief. Het beeld van de Nederlandse zeventiende-eeuwse schilderkunst in later tijd, Nijmegen 1992, pp. 225–249 (English translation 1999)
- ‘De iconologische benadering van de zeventiende-eeuwse Nederlandse schilderkunst’, in Frans Grijzenhout & Henk van Veen (eds.), De gouden eeuw in perspectief. Het beeld van de Nederlandse zeventiende-eeuwse schilderkunst in later tijd, Nijmegen 1992, pp. 299–329 (English translation 1999)
- ‘Die "Sprachlichkeit" der niederländischen Malerei im 17. Jahrhundert’, in Sabine Schulze (ed.), Leselust. Niederländische Malerei von Rembrandt bis Vermeer, Schirn Kunsthalle, Frankfurt 1993, pp. 23–33
- ‘Realism and Seeming Realism in Seventeenth-Century Dutch Painting’, in Wayne Franits (ed.), Looking at Seventeenth-Century Dutch Art. Realism Reconsidered, Cambridge 1997, pp. 21–56, 206-211
- ‘Painted Words in Dutch Art of the Seventeenth Century’, in Iain Hampshire-Monk, Karin Tilmans en Frank van Vree (eds.), History of Concepts: Comparative Perspectives, Amsterdam 1998, pp. 167–189
- ‘On balance’, in Ivan Gaskell and Michiel Jonker (eds.), Vermeer Studies (Studies in the History of Art 55), National Gallery of Art, Washington D.C. 1998, pp. 351–365
- ‘The model woman and women of flesh and blood’, in Julia Lloyd Williams (ed.), Rembrandt’s Women, National Gallery of Scotland, Edinburgh, Royal Academy, London 2001, pp. 29-35
- ‘Vluchtige rook vereeuwigd. Betekenissen van tabaksgebruik in zeventiende-eeuwse voorstellingen’, in Rookgordijnen. Roken in de kunsten: van olieverf tot celluloid, Kunsthal, Rotterdam 2003, pp. 85–127
- ‘De symboliek van vis, visser, visgerei en vangst’, in Liesbeth M. Helmus (ed.), VIS. Stillevens van Hollandse en Vlaamse meesters 1550-1700, Centraal Museum, Utrecht en Amos Anderson Art Museum, Helsinki 2004, pp. 75–119 (English edition: ‘The symbolism of fish, fisherman, fishing gear and the catch’, in Liesbeth M. Helmus (ed.) FISH. Still lifes by Dutch and Flemish masters 1550-1700, Centraal Museum, Utrecht and Amos Anderson Art Museum, Helsinki 2004, pp. 75–119)
- ‘Frans van Mieris: Questions of Understanding’, in Quentin Buvelot (ed.), Frans van Mieris 1635-1681, Washington (National Gallery of Art) 2006, pp. 44–61, 216-218
- ‘De iconografische voorraadkamer’, in Mariëtte Haveman, Eddy de Jongh, Ann-Sophie Lehmann en Annemiek Overbeek (eds.), Ateliergeheimen. Over de werkplaats van de Nederlandse kunstenaar vanaf 1200 tot heden, Lochem-Amsterdam 2006, pp. 162–187
- ‘Angenehme Täuschung und angenehmes Dunkel’, in: exhib. cat. Schein oder Wirklichkeit? Realismus in der Niederländischen Malerei des 17. Jahrhunderts, Emden (Ostfriesisches Landesmuseum) 2010, pp. 10–19
- ‘Rembrandt in de ogen van Peter Vos’, in: Face Book. Studies on Dutch and Flemish portraiture of the 16th-18th centuries. Liber amicorum presented to Rudolf E.O. Ekkart on the occasion of his 65th birthday, Leiden 2012, pp. 175–182
- ‘"Things that intimate more than they say". On the iconological approach to seventeenth-century Dutch art’, in: exhib. cat. = Rembrandt and the Golden Age of Dutch Painting. Szépmüvészeti Múzeum, Budapest 2014–2015, pp. 82–101
- ‘The Heights of Inspiration. Hercules Segers’s "delight in strangeness"’, in: cat. tent. Under the Spell of Hercules Segers. Rembrandt and the Moderns, Museum het Rembrandthuis 2016-2017, pp. 43-59
- ‘Een verhandeling over de mens in wekelijkse afleveringen’, in: Siegfried Woldhek. Zie zo, Zwolle 2017, pp. 146–160
- ‘Onverbloemde en getransformeerde zelfportretten van Peter Vos’, in: Anna Cecilia Koldeweij & Jos Koldeweij (eds.), De verbeelder verbeeld(t). Boekillustratie en beeldende kunst, Nijmegen 2017, pp. 28–35
- ‘Blufvertoon met de benen. Verwarrende associaties naar aanleiding van Jan Steens De burger van Delft’, in: Een opmerkelijk oog. Essays opgedragen aan Jeroen Stumpel ter ere van zijn emeritaat. Article 19 (December 2017), pp. 20–26
- ‘De kneedbare Rembrandt. Hoe Hollandse kunst wordt gebruikt in debatten over identiteit’, Ons Erfdeel 62, No. 2 (May 2019), pp. 88–101 (online in English: ‘The Malleable Rembrandt. How Dutch art is used in debates about identity’)
