= Pieter de Josselin de Jong =

Dutch painter

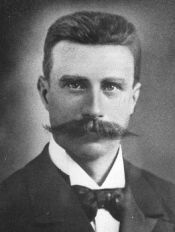
- De Josselin de Jong
- Born: 2 August 1861; Sint-Oedenrode
- Died: 2 June 1906 (aged 44); The Hague

Pieter de Josselin de Jong (2 August 1861 – 2 June 1906) was a Dutch painter from North Brabant.

== Life ==
Josselin de Jong was born in Sint-Oedenrode and was trained at the art academy in Den Bosch before attending the Royal Academy of Arts in Antwerp. He also attended the École des Beaux-Arts in Paris. He was a member of Arti et Amicitiae and the Pulchri Studio. He died in The Hague.

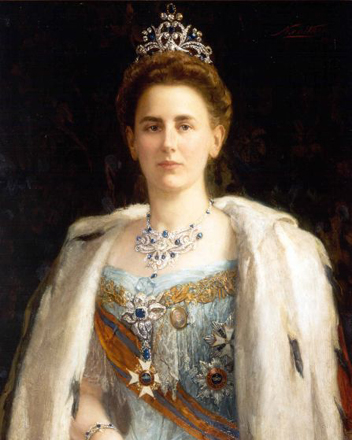
Portrait of Queen Wilhelmina in 1898

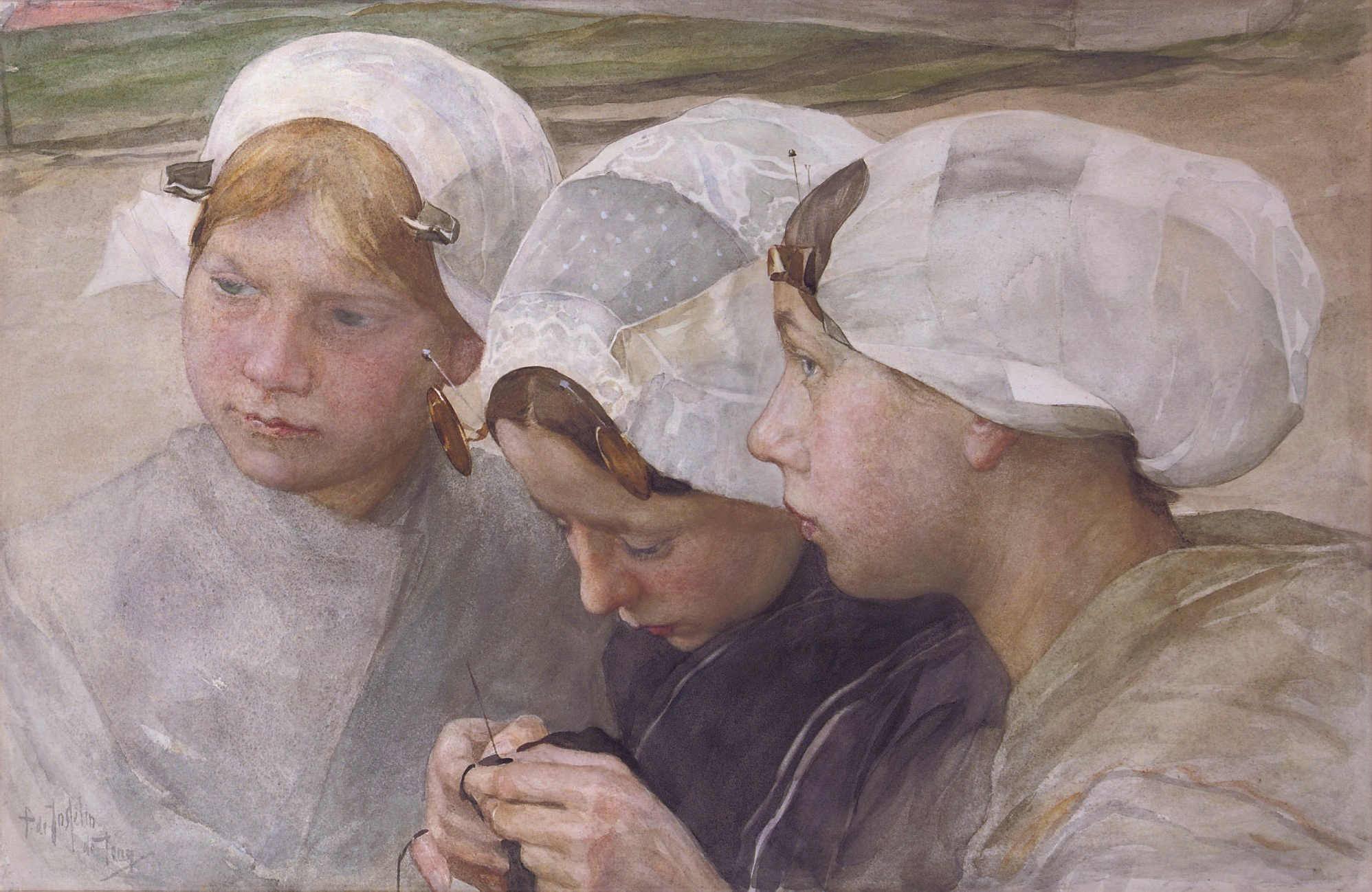
Three girls from Scheveningen

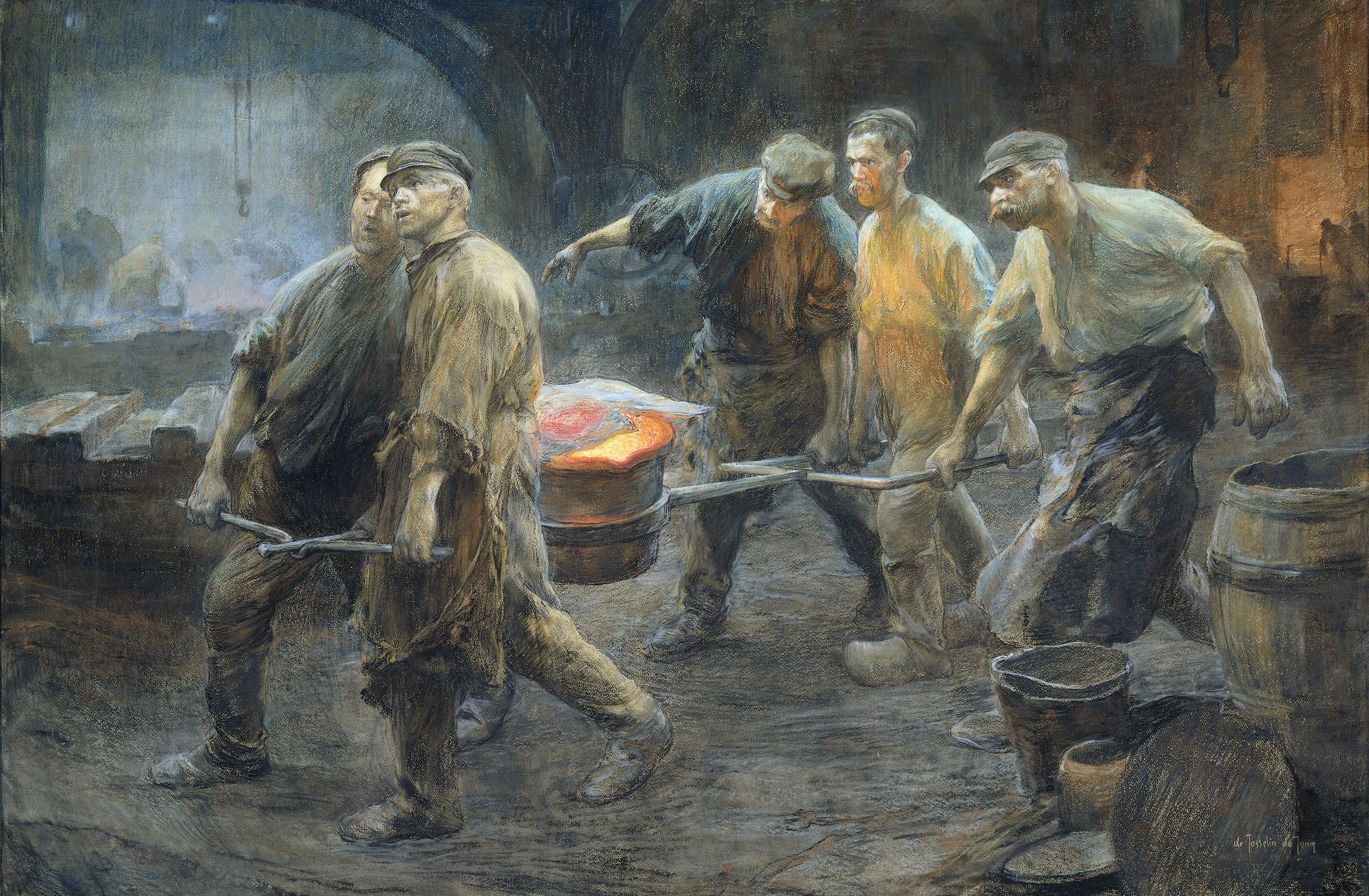
Foundry

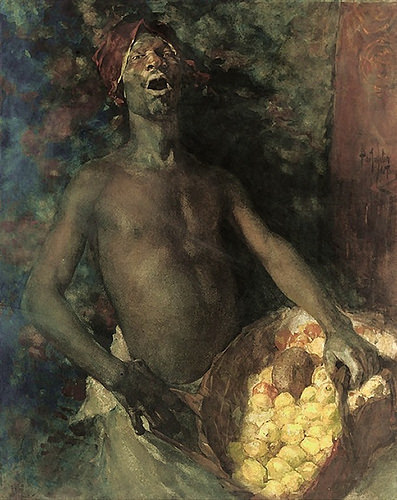
Lemon seller

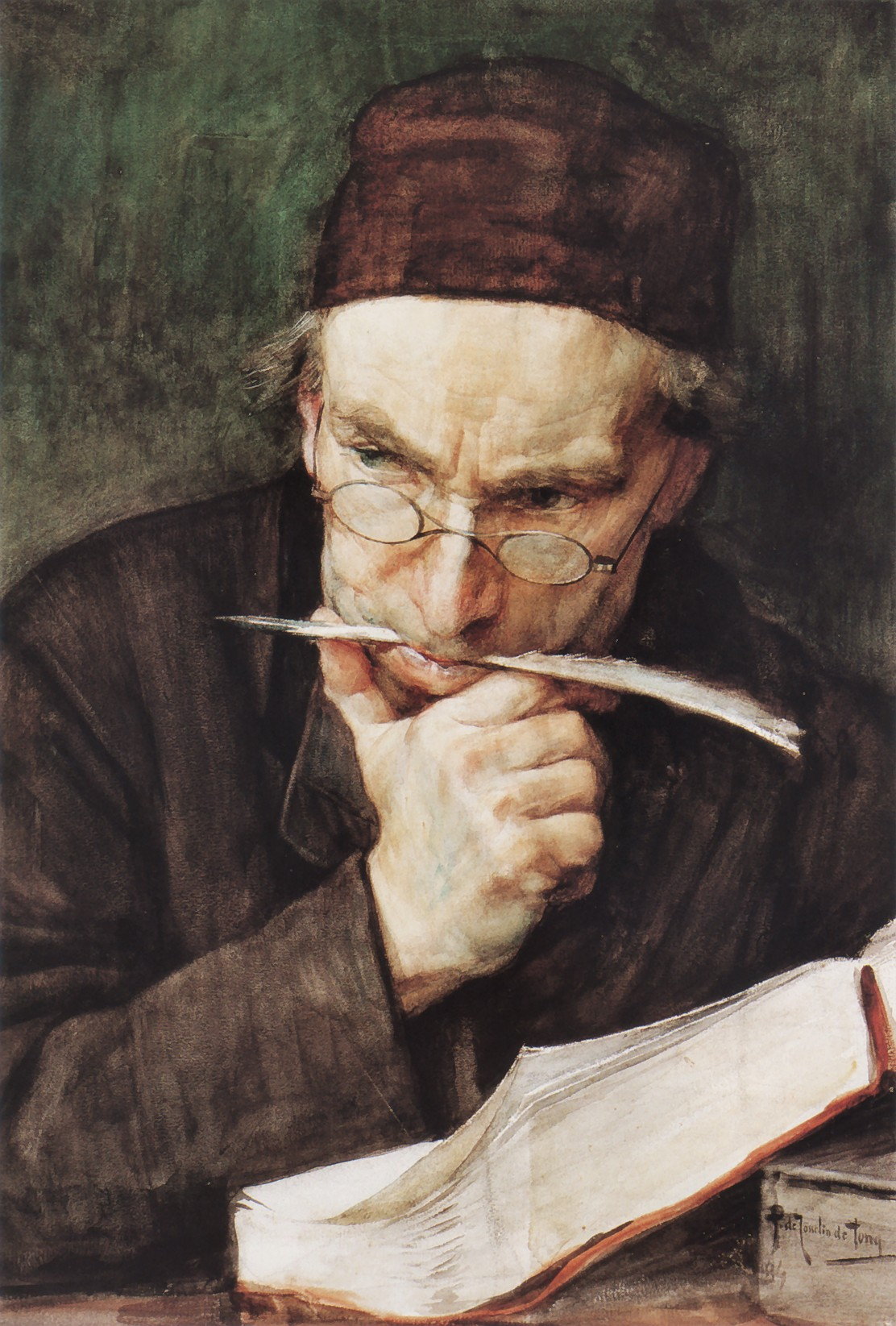
Pennelikker
