= Bonifacius de Jonge =

Dutch government official (1567–1625)

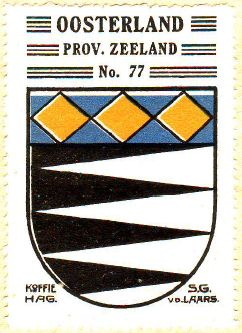
Crest of the Heerlijkheid Oosterland

Bonifacius de Jonge, Heer of Oosterland and Heer-Jansland in Zeeland (Zierikzee, 1567 – Middelburg, June 1625) was raadpensionaris of Zeeland province in the Dutch Republic between 1615 and 1625.

== Career ==
De Jonge was the eldest son of Jan de Jonge van Oosterland, burgemeester of the city of Zierikzee, and Cornelia Boenze. He first became pensionary of his native city and was appointed Secretary of the States of Zeeland on 24 March 1599. He was raadpensionaris of Zeeland from 18 February 1615 until his death in 1625.

== Personal life ==
De Jonge was married several times:

- Maria Stavenisse (1587 - 1591)
- Dina de Huybert (1595 - 1601)
- Catharina Winckelman (1603; she survived him by 22 years)

He had many children. Among his descendants are Bonifacius Cornelis de Jonge and Johannes Cornelis de Jonge.
