= Pearson Test of English =

Suite of English language proficiency examinations

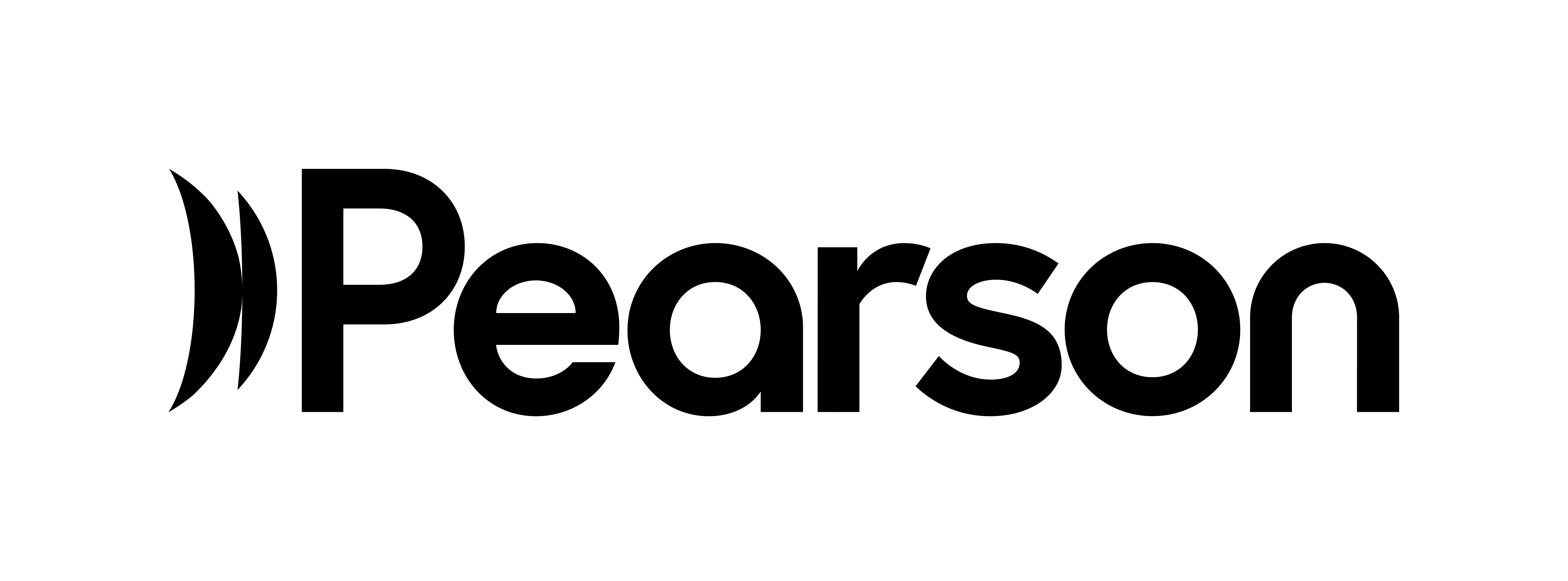
- Pearson logo (as of 2025)
- Acronym: PTE
- Type: Computer-based English language proficiency examination
- Administrator: Pearson plc
- Skills tested: Listening, reading, speaking, writing
- Purpose: Academic admission, employment, and migration assessment
- Year started: 2009
- Duration: Approximately 2 hours (varies by test)
- Score range: 10–90 (Global Scale of English)
- Score validity: Typically 2 years
- Offered: Year-round
- Restrictions on attempts: No formal limit (restrictions may apply by test centre or authority)
- Regions: Worldwide
- Languages: English
- Prerequisites: None
- Fee: Varies by country and test centre
- Used by: Universities, employers, and immigration authorities
- Related tests: IELTS, TOEFL, CELPIP
- Website: www.pearsonpte.com
- Some versions are approved as Secure English Language Tests (SELT) for UK visas and for immigration programmes in Australia, Canada, and New Zealand.

Pearson Test of English (PTE) is a suite of computer-based English language proficiency examinations developed and administered by Pearson plc. It is designed to assess English language ability for academic admission, employment, and migration purposes. PTE assessments measure four language skills: listening, reading, speaking, and writing.

PTE tests are reported using the Global Scale of English (GSE), a numerical scale ranging from 10 to 90 that is aligned to the Common European Framework of Reference for Languages (CEFR).

PTE is accepted by academic institutions in Australia, Canada, New Zealand, the United Kingdom, the United States, and Europe. Certain PTE tests are recognised for visa and immigration purposes in multiple countries.

PTE is one of several major international English language proficiency examinations, alongside the International English Language Testing System (IELTS), the Test of English as a Foreign Language (TOEFL), and the Canadian English Language Proficiency Index Program (CELPIP).

== Examinations ==
Exam	Full name	Primary purpose	Main uses	Target users
PTE Academic	Pearson Test of English Academic	Assessment of academic English proficiency	University and college admissions; professional registration; migration applications in Australia and New Zealand	Students and professionals
PTE Academic UKVI	Pearson Test of English Academic (UKVI)	Secure English Language Test (SELT) for the United Kingdom	UK work and study visas requiring a four-skills SELT	UK visa applicants
PTE Core	Pearson Test of English Core	Assessment of general English for Canadian immigration	Canadian permanent residency and immigration programmes	Immigration applicants to Canada
PTE Home A1	Pearson Test of English Home A1	Basic speaking and listening proficiency	UK family and partner visa applications	Family visa applicants
PTE Home A2	Pearson Test of English Home A2	Elementary speaking and listening proficiency	UK settlement route applications	Family visa extension applicants
PTE Home B1	Pearson Test of English Home B1	Intermediate speaking and listening proficiency	UK settlement and citizenship applications	Permanent residence and citizenship applicants

== PTE Academic ==
=== History and development ===
PTE Academic was launched in 2009 as a computer-based English language proficiency test primarily for higher education admissions and migration purposes. It was developed as an alternative to established English proficiency examinations and uses automated scoring technologies for speaking and writing tasks.

=== Test format ===
PTE Academic is delivered in a single session at authorised test centres and assesses speaking, writing, reading, and listening skills. The test duration is approximately two hours.

The test is divided into three sections:

Section	Duration (approx.)	Description
Speaking & Writing	54–67 minutes	Includes read aloud, repeat sentence, describe image, retell lecture, answer short questions, summarise written text, and essay writing. A personal introduction task is included but not scored.
Reading	29–30 minutes	Includes multiple choice questions, re-order paragraphs, and fill-in-the-blank tasks.
Listening	30–43 minutes	Includes tasks based on audio or audio-visual recordings to assess comprehension.

=== Scoring ===
Scores are reported on Pearson's Global Scale of English (10–90), aligned to the CEFR.

PTE Academic uses automated scoring systems to assess responses. Pearson states that certain tasks may include human expert review to ensure scoring quality and fairness.

Pearson reports that results are typically available within 48 hours, although processing times may take up to five days.

=== Acceptance ===
PTE Academic is accepted by universities and colleges globally. It is also recognised for visa and migration purposes, including by:

- Australian Government Department of Home Affairs
- Immigration New Zealand

== PTE Core ==
PTE Core is a general English language proficiency test introduced by Pearson and approved by Immigration, Refugees and Citizenship Canada (IRCC) for economic immigration programmes.

The test became available in 2024 following IRCC approval. It assesses listening, reading, speaking, and writing skills in practical and workplace-related contexts rather than academic settings.

=== Format ===
PTE Core is delivered in authorised test centres and uses automated scoring technologies.

Section	Duration (approx.)	Description
Speaking & Writing	~50 minutes	Includes read aloud, repeat sentences, describe images, respond to situations, summarise written text, and email writing tasks.
Reading	~30 minutes	Includes fill-in-the-blank tasks, multiple choice questions, and re-order paragraphs.
Listening	~30 minutes	Includes summarising spoken text and other listening comprehension tasks.

Scores are valid for two years for immigration purposes.

PTE Core is not intended for university admission purposes.

== PTE Secure English Language Tests (SELT) ==
Pearson provides Secure English Language Tests (SELT) approved by the United Kingdom Home Office for visa and immigration applications. SELT tests must be taken at an approved test centre and include a Secure English Language Test Unique Reference Number (SELT URN) on the score report.

=== Types ===
- PTE Academic UKVI – A four-skills test (speaking, listening, reading, writing) delivered in compliance with UKVI security requirements.
- PTE Home A1 – Speaking and listening at CEFR A1 level.
- PTE Home A2 – Speaking and listening at CEFR A2 level.
- PTE Home B1 – Speaking and listening at CEFR B1 level.

These tests correspond to CEFR proficiency requirements under UK immigration rules.

=== UK acceptance ===
PTE SELT tests are included on the UK Home Office list of approved Secure English Language Tests for visa and immigration applications.

== Research and validation ==
Pearson publishes technical documentation regarding the development and validation of its English language assessments.

Automated scoring systems in language testing have been examined in academic literature regarding reliability and validity.

Independent research has examined the relationship between PTE Academic scores and scores on the International English Language Testing System (IELTS) Academic test, exploring equivalence and the comparability of the two assessments.^

Academic research has examined standardized English language assessments, including studies comparing PTE Academic with other established tests and evaluating its relationship to academic performance. For example, independent researchers at the University of Exeter analyzed the use of PTE Academic scores to predict achievement and proficiency gains within an intensive English for Academic Purposes (EAP) foundation programme, providing evidence on how PTE scores correlate with subsequent educational outcomes.

Another academic paper has examined aspects of PTE Academic's test design and validity. A research note published on ResearchGate investigated the cognitive and face validity of specific writing tasks in PTE Academic, such as Summarize Written Text and Write Essay, providing evidence that these item types function as intended in assessing writing proficiency.

== See also ==
- International English Language Testing System
- Test of English as a Foreign Language
- Canadian English Language Proficiency Index Program
- Common European Framework of Reference for Languages
