= Bert de Jong (politician) =

Dutch politician (1945–2026)

Member of the Senate of the Netherlands
- In office 8 June 1999 – 15 July 2000

Personal details
- Born: 5 August 1945 Westzaan, Netherlands
- Died: 5 July 2026 (aged 80) Vierhouten, Netherlands
- Party: Christian Democratic Appeal

Engelbertus Pieter "Bert" de Jong (5 August 1945 – 5 July 2026) was a Dutch politician who was a member of the Dutch Senate from 8 June 1999 until 15 July 2000 for the Christian Democratic Appeal.

De Jong studied Dutch law at Utrecht University between 1963 and 1969. He earned his promotion at the same university in 1975. Starting in 1979 he was a professor of social law at the Vrije Universiteit Amsterdam. He later was president of the board of trustees of the Sociale Verzekeringsbank.

De Jong was made Knight of the Order of Orange-Nassau on 29 April 1997. He died in Vierhouten on 5 July 2026, at the age of 80.
