= List of European Aquatics Championships medalists in swimming (men) =

This is the complete list of men's LEN European Aquatics Championships medalists in swimming from 1926 to date.

== Freestyle ==
=== 50 metre ===
Year	Gold	Silver	Bronze
1987 Strasbourg	Jörg Woithe (GDR)	Gennadiy Prigoda (URS)	Stéfan Voléry (SUI)
1989 Bonn	Volodymyr Tkachenko (URS)	Evgeniy Kotriaga (URS)	Nils Rudolph (GDR)
1991 Athens	Nils Rudolph (GER)	Gennadiy Prigoda (URS)	Mike Fibbens (GBR)
1991 Athens	Nils Rudolph (GER)	Gennadiy Prigoda (URS)	Volodymyr Tkachenko (URS)
1993 Sheffield	Aleksandr Popov (RUS)	Christophe Kalfayan (FRA)	Raimundas Mažuolis (LIT)
1995 Vienna	Aleksandr Popov (RUS)	Christophe Kalfayan (FRA)	Torsten Spanneberg (GER)
1997 Seville	Aleksandr Popov (RUS)	Mark Foster (GBR)	Julien Sicot (FRA)
1999 Istanbul	Pieter van den Hoogenband (NED)	Lorenzo Vismara (ITA)	Aleksandr Popov (RUS)
2000 Helsinki	Aleksandr Popov (RUS)	Pieter van den Hoogenband (NED)	Lorenzo Vismara (ITA)
2002 Berlin	Bartosz Kizierowski (POL)	Lorenzo Vismara (ITA)	Oleksandr Volynets (UKR)
2004 Madrid	Aleksandr Popov (RUS)	Stefan Nystrand (SWE)	Lorenzo Vismara (ITA)
2006 Budapest	Bartosz Kizierowski (POL)	Oleksandr Volynets (UKR)	Duje Draganja (CRO)
2008 Eindhoven	Alain Bernard (FRA)	Duje Draganja (CRO)	Stefan Nystrand (SWE)
2010 Budapest	Frédérick Bousquet (FRA)	Stefan Nystrand (SWE)	Fabien Gilot (FRA)
2012 Debrecen	Frédérick Bousquet (FRA)	Stefan Nystrand (SWE)	Andriy Govorov (UKR)
2014 Berlin	Florent Manaudou (FRA)	Konrad Czerniak (POL)	Ari-Pekka Liukkonen (FIN)
2016 London	Florent Manaudou (FRA)	Andriy Govorov (UKR)	Ben Proud (GBR)
2018 Glasgow	Ben Proud (GBR)	Kristian Gkolomeev (GRE)	Andrea Vergani (ITA)
2020 Budapest	Ari-Pekka Liukkonen (FIN)	Ben Proud (GBR)	Kristian Gkolomeev (GRE)
2022 Rome	Ben Proud (GBR)	Leonardo Deplano (ITA)	Kristian Gkolomeev (GRE)
2024 Belgrade	Kristian Gkolomeev (GRE)	Stergios Marios Bilas (GRE)	Vladyslav Bukhov (UKR)
2026 Paris	Nikita Sheremet (UKR)	Egor Kornev (NAB) Andrej Barna (SRB)	Not awarded

=== 100 metre ===
Year	Gold	Silver	Bronze
1926 Budapest	István Bárány (HUN)	Arne Borg (SWE)	Georg Werner (SWE)
1927 Bologna	Arne Borg (SWE)	István Bárány (HUN)	August Heitmann (GER)
1931 Paris	István Bárány (HUN)	András Székely (HUN)	Pavol Steiner (TCH)
1934 Magdeburg	Ferenc Csik (HUN)	Helmuth Fischer (GER)	Otto Wille (GER)
1938 London	Kees Hoving (NED)	Frederick Dove (GBR)	István Körösi (HUN)
1947 Monte Carlo	Alex Jany (FRA)	Per-Olof Olsson (SWE)	Elemér Szathmáry (HUN)
1950 Vienna	Alex Jany (FRA)	Göran Larsson (SWE)	Joris Tjebbes (NED)
1954 Turin	Imre Nyéki (HUN)	Lev Balandin (URS)	Géza Kádas (HUN)
1958 Budapest	Paolo Pucci (ITA)	Viktor Konoplyov (URS)	Gyula Dobay (HUN)
1962 Leipzig	Alain Gottvallès (FRA)	Per-Ola Lindberg (SWE)	Ron Kroon (NED)
1966 Utrecht	Bob McGregor (GBR)	Leonid Ilyichov (URS)	Udo Poser (GDR)
1970 Barcelona	Michel Rousseau (FRA)	Roland Matthes (GDR)	Georgi Kulikov (URS)
1974 Vienna	Peter Nocke (FRG)	Vladimir Bure (URS)	Klaus Steinbach (FRG)
1977 Jönköping	Peter Nocke (FRG)	Vladimir Bure (URS)	Marcello Guarducci (ITA)
1981 Split	Per Johansson (SWE)	Jörg Woithe (GDR)	Sergey Krasyuk (URS)
1983 Rome	Per Johansson (SWE)	Jörg Woithe (GDR)	Sergey Smiryagin (URS)
1985 Sofia	Stéphan Caron (FRA)	Jörg Woithe (GDR)	Stéfan Voléry (SUI)
1987 Strasbourg	Sven Lodziewski (GDR)	Stéphan Caron (FRA)	Dirk Richter (GDR)
1989 Bonn	Giorgio Lamberti (ITA)	Yuri Bashkatov (URS)	Raimundas Mažuolis (URS)
1991 Athens	Aleksandr Popov (URS)	Nils Rudolph (GER)	Giorgio Lamberti (ITA)
1993 Sheffield	Aleksandr Popov (RUS)	Tommy Werner (SWE)	Pavlo Khnykin (UKR)
1995 Vienna	Aleksandr Popov (RUS)	Torsten Spanneberg (GER)	Björn Zikarsky (GER)
1997 Seville	Aleksandr Popov (RUS)	Lars Frölander (SWE)	Oleg Rukhlevich (BLR)
1999 Istanbul	Pieter van den Hoogenband (NED)	Aleksandr Popov (RUS)	Lars Frölander (SWE)
2000 Helsinki	Aleksandr Popov (RUS)	Pieter van den Hoogenband (NED)	Lars Frölander (SWE)
2002 Berlin	Pieter van den Hoogenband (NED)	Aleksandr Popov (RUS)	Duje Draganja (CRO)
2004 Madrid	Filippo Magnini (ITA)	Pieter van den Hoogenband (NED)	Christian Galenda (ITA)
2006 Budapest	Filippo Magnini (ITA)	Stefan Nystrand (SWE)	Pieter van den Hoogenband (NED)
2008 Eindhoven	Alain Bernard (FRA)	Stefan Nystrand (SWE)	Filippo Magnini (ITA)
2010 Budapest	Alain Bernard (FRA)	Yevgeny Lagunov (RUS)	William Meynard (FRA)
2012 Debrecen	Filippo Magnini (ITA)	Alain Bernard (FRA)	Norbert Trandafir (ROU)
2014 Berlin	Florent Manaudou (FRA)	Fabien Gilot (FRA)	Luca Leonardi (ITA)
2016 London	Luca Dotto (ITA)	Sebastiaan Verschuren (NED)	Clément Mignon (FRA)
2018 Glasgow	Alessandro Miressi (ITA)	Duncan Scott (GBR)	Mehdy Metella (FRA)
2020 Budapest	Kliment Kolesnikov (RUS)	Alessandro Miressi (ITA)	Andrey Minakov (RUS)
2022 Rome	David Popovici (ROU)	Kristóf Milák (HUN)	Alessandro Miressi (ITA)
2024 Belgrade	David Popovici (ROU)	Nándor Németh (HUN)	Andrej Barna (SRB)
2026 Paris	David Popovici (ROU)	Egor Kornev NAB	Kristóf Milák (HUN)

=== 200 metre ===
Year	Gold	Silver	Bronze
1970 Barcelona	Hans Fassnacht (FRG)	Gunnar Larsson (SWE)	Georgi Kulikov (URS)
1974 Vienna	Peter Nocke (FRG)	Klaus Steinbach (FRG)	Aleksandr Samsonov (URS)
1977 Jönköping	Peter Nocke (FRG)	Andrey Krylov (URS)	Marcello Guarducci (ITA)
1981 Split	Sergey Koplyakov (URS)	Michael Söderlund (SWE)	Thomas Lejdström (SWE)
1983 Rome	Michael Gross (FRG)	Jörg Woithe (GDR)	Thomas Fahrner (FRG)
1985 Sofia	Michael Gross (FRG)	Sven Lodziewski (GDR)	Tommy Werner (SWE)
1987 Strasbourg	Anders Holmertz (SWE)	Giorgio Lamberti (ITA)	Michael Gross (FRG)
1989 Bonn	Giorgio Lamberti (ITA)	Artur Wojdat (POL)	Anders Holmertz (SWE)
1991 Athens	Artur Wojdat (POL)	Giorgio Lamberti (ITA)	Roberto Gleria (ITA)
1993 Sheffield	Antti Kasvio (FIN)	Yevgeny Sadovyi (RUS)	Anders Holmertz (SWE)
1995 Vienna	Jani Sievinen (FIN)	Anders Holmertz (SWE)	Antti Kasvio (FIN)
1997 Seville	Paul Palmer (GBR)	Massimiliano Rosolino (ITA)	Béla Szabados (HUN)
1999 Istanbul	Pieter van den Hoogenband (NED)	Paul Palmer (GBR)	Massimiliano Rosolino (ITA)
2000 Helsinki	Massimiliano Rosolino (ITA)	Pieter van den Hoogenband (NED)	Paul Palmer (GBR)
2002 Berlin	Pieter van den Hoogenband (NED)	Emiliano Brembilla (ITA)	Massimiliano Rosolino (ITA)
2004 Madrid	Pieter van den Hoogenband (NED)	Andrey Kapralov (RUS)	Filippo Magnini (ITA)
2004 Madrid	Pieter van den Hoogenband (NED)	Andrey Kapralov (RUS)	Massimiliano Rosolino (ITA)
2006 Budapest	Pieter van den Hoogenband (NED)	Massimiliano Rosolino (ITA)	Filippo Magnini (ITA)
2008 Eindhoven	Paul Biedermann (GER)	Amaury Leveaux (FRA)	Massimiliano Rosolino (ITA)
2010 Budapest	Paul Biedermann (GER)	Nikita Lobintsev (RUS)	Sebastiaan Verschuren (NED)
2012 Debrecen	Paul Biedermann (GER)	Amaury Leveaux (FRA)	Dominik Kozma (HUN)
2014 Berlin	Velimir Stjepanović (SRB)	Paul Biedermann (GER)	Yannick Agnel (FRA)
2016 London	Sebastiaan Verschuren (NED)	Velimir Stjepanović (SRB)	James Guy (GBR)
2018 Glasgow	Duncan Scott (GBR)	Danas Rapšys (LIT)	Mikhail Dovgalyuk (RUS)
2020 Budapest	Martin Malyutin (RUS)	Duncan Scott (GBR)	Tom Dean (GBR)
2022 Rome	David Popovici (ROU)	Antonio Djakovic (SUI)	Felix Auböck (AUT)
2024 Belgrade	David Popovici (ROU)	Danas Rapšys (LIT)	Antonio Djakovic (SUI)
2026 Paris	David Popovici (ROU)	Tomas Navikonis (LTU)	James Guy (GBR)

=== 400 metre ===
Year	Gold	Silver	Bronze
1926 Budapest	Arne Borg (SWE)	Herbert Heinrich (GER)	Friedel Berges (GER)
1927 Bologna	Arne Borg (SWE)	Herbert Heinrich (GER)	Václav Antoš (TCH)
1931 Paris	István Bárány (HUN)	Jean Taris (FRA)	Paolo Costoli (ITA)
1934 Magdeburg	Jean Taris (FRA)	Giacomo Signori (ITA)	Paolo Costoli (ITA)
1938 London	Björn Borg (SWE)	Werner Plath (GER)	Norman Wainwright (GBR)
1947 Monte Carlo	Alex Jany (FRA)	György Mitró (HUN)	Miloslav Bartušek (TCH)
1950 Vienna	Alex Jany (FRA)	Jean Boiteux (FRA)	Heinz-Günther Lehmann (FRG)
1954 Turin	György Csordás (HUN)	Angelo Romani (ITA)	Per-Olof Östrand (SWE)
1958 Budapest	Ian Black (GBR)	Boris Nikitin (URS)	Paolo Galletti (ITA)
1962 Leipzig	Johan Bontekoe (NED)	Hans Rosendahl (SWE)	Frank Wiegand (GDR)
1966 Utrecht	Frank Wiegand (GDR)	Semyon Belits-Geiman (URS)	Alain Mosconi (FRA)
1970 Barcelona	Gunnar Larsson (SWE)	Hans Fassnacht (FRG)	Santiago Esteva (ESP)
1974 Vienna	Aleksandr Samsonov (URS)	Bengt Gingsjö (SWE)	Andrey Krylov (URS)
1977 Jönköping	Sergey Rusin (URS)	Frank Wennmann (FRG)	Frank Pfütze (GDR)
1981 Split	Borut Petrič (YUG)	Vladimir Salnikov (URS)	Darjan Petrič (YUG)
1983 Rome	Vladimir Salnikov (URS)	Borut Petrič (YUG)	Darjan Petrič (YUG)
1985 Sofia	Uwe Dassler (GDR)	Sven Lodziewski (GDR)	Rainer Henkel (FRG)
1987 Strasbourg	Uwe Dassler (GDR)	Rainer Henkel (FRG)	Thomas Fahrner (FRG)
1989 Bonn	Artur Wojdat (POL)	Stefan Pfeiffer (FRG)	Mariusz Podkościelny (POL)
1991 Athens	Yevgeny Sadovyi (URS)	Artur Wojdat (POL)	Giorgio Lamberti (ITA)
1993 Sheffield	Antti Kasvio (FIN)	Paul Palmer (GBR)	Anders Holmertz (SWE)
1995 Vienna	Steffen Zesner (GER)	Paul Palmer (GBR)	Anders Holmertz (SWE)
1997 Seville	Emiliano Brembilla (ITA)	Massimiliano Rosolino (ITA)	Paul Palmer (GBR)
1999 Istanbul	Paul Palmer (GBR)	Emiliano Brembilla (ITA)	Dragoș Coman (ROM)
2000 Helsinki	Emiliano Brembilla (ITA)	Dragoș Coman (ROM)	Paul Palmer (GBR)
2002 Berlin	Emiliano Brembilla (ITA)	Massimiliano Rosolino (ITA)	Dragoș Coman (ROM)
2004 Madrid	Emiliano Brembilla (ITA)	Yury Prilukov (RUS)	Dragoș Coman (ROM)
2006 Budapest	Yury Prilukov (RUS)	Massimiliano Rosolino (ITA)	Nicolas Rostoucher (FRA)
2008 Eindhoven	Yury Prilukov (RUS)	Massimiliano Rosolino (ITA)	Nikita Lobintsev (RUS)
2010 Budapest	Yannick Agnel (FRA)	Paul Biedermann (GER)	Gergő Kis (HUN)
2012 Debrecen	Paul Biedermann (GER)	Gergő Kis (HUN)	Samuel Pizzetti (ITA)
2014 Berlin	Velimir Stjepanović (SRB)	Mitch D'Arrigo (ITA)	Jay Lelliott (GBR)
2016 London	Gabriele Detti (ITA)	Henrik Christiansen (NOR)	Péter Bernek (HUN)
2018 Glasgow	Mykhailo Romanchuk (UKR)	Henrik Christiansen (NOR)	Henning Mühlleitner (GER)
2020 Budapest	Martin Malyutin (RUS)	Felix Auböck (AUT)	Danas Rapšys (LIT)
2022 Rome	Lukas Märtens (GER)	Antonio Djakovic (SUI)	Henning Mühlleitner (GER)
2024 Belgrade	Felix Auböck (AUT)	Dimitrios Markos (GRE)	Antonio Djakovic (SUI)
2026 Paris	Léon Marchand (FRA)	Olivér Pápai (HUN)	Lukas Märtens (GER)

=== 800 metre ===
Year	Gold	Silver	Bronze
2008 Eindhoven	Gergő Kis (HUN)	Samuel Pizzetti (ITA)	Dragoș Coman (ROM)
2010 Budapest	Sébastien Rouault (FRA)	Christian Kubusch (GER)	Samuel Pizzetti (ITA)
2012 Debrecen	Gergő Kis (HUN)	Gregorio Paltrinieri (ITA)	Serhiy Frolov (UKR)
2014 Berlin	Gregorio Paltrinieri (ITA)	Pál Joensen (FRO)	Gabriele Detti (ITA)
2016 London	Gregorio Paltrinieri (ITA)	Gabriele Detti (ITA)	Mykhailo Romanchuk (UKR)
2018 Glasgow	Mykhailo Romanchuk (UKR)	Gregorio Paltrinieri (ITA)	Florian Wellbrock (GER)
2020 Budapest	Mykhailo Romanchuk (UKR)	Gregorio Paltrinieri (ITA)	Gabriele Detti (ITA)
2022 Rome	Gregorio Paltrinieri (ITA)	Lukas Märtens (GER)	Lorenzo Galossi (ITA)
2024 Belgrade	Mykhailo Romanchuk (UKR)	Dimitrios Markos (GRE)	Zalán Sárkány (HUN)
2026 Paris	Johannes Liebmann (GER)	Sven Schwarz (GER)	Zalán Sárkány (HUN)

=== 1500 metre ===
Year	Gold	Silver	Bronze
1926 Budapest	Arne Borg (SWE)	Friedel Berges (GER)	Joachim Rademacher (GER)
1927 Bologna	Arne Borg (SWE)	Giuseppe Perentin (ITA)	Joachim Rademacher (GER)
1931 Paris	Olivér Halassy (HUN)	Giuseppe Perentin (ITA)	Paolo Costoli (ITA)
1934 Magdeburg	Jean Taris (FRA)	Paolo Costoli (ITA)	Norman Wainwright (GBR)
1938 London	Björn Borg (SWE)	Bob Leivers (GBR)	Heinz Arendt (GER)
1947 Monte Carlo	György Mitró (HUN)	Ferenc Vörös (HUN)	Marijan Stipetić (YUG)
1950 Vienna	Heinz-Günther Lehmann (FRG)	Jean Boiteux (FRA)	Joseph Bernardo (FRA)
1954 Turin	György Csordás (HUN)	György Schuszter (HUN)	Vladimir Lavrinenko (URS)
1958 Budapest	Ian Black (GBR)	József Katona (HUN)	Gennady Androsov (URS)
1962 Leipzig	József Katona (HUN)	Miguel Torres (ESP)	Richard Campion (GBR)
1966 Utrecht	Semyon Belits-Geiman (URS)	Alan Kimber (GBR)	Aleksandr Pletnev (URS)
1970 Barcelona	Hans Fassnacht (FRG)	Werner Lampe (FRG)	Santiago Esteva (ESP)
1974 Vienna	Frank Pfütze (GDR)	James Carter (GBR)	Igor Yevgrafov (URS)
1977 Jönköping	Vladimir Salnikov (URS)	Valentin Parinov (URS)	Borut Petrič (YUG)
1981 Split	Vladimir Salnikov (URS)	Borut Petrič (YUG)	Rafael Escalas (ESP)
1983 Rome	Vladimir Salnikov (URS)	Borut Petrič (YUG)	Stefan Pfeiffer (FRG)
1985 Sofia	Uwe Dassler (GDR)	Rainer Henkel (FRG)	Stefan Pfeiffer (FRG)
1987 Strasbourg	Rainer Henkel (FRG)	Uwe Dassler (GDR)	Stefan Pfeiffer (FRG)
1989 Bonn	Jörg Hoffmann (GDR)	Stefan Pfeiffer (FRG)	Mariusz Podkościelny (POL)
1991 Athens	Jörg Hoffmann (GER)	Ian Wilson (GBR)	Sebastian Wiese (GER)
1993 Sheffield	Jörg Hoffmann (GER)	Sebastian Wiese (GER)	Igor Majcen (SLO)
1995 Vienna	Jörg Hoffmann (GER)	Graeme Smith (GBR)	Steffen Zesner (GER)
1997 Seville	Emiliano Brembilla (ITA)	Ihor Snitko (UKR)	Denys Zavhorodnyy (UKR)
1999 Istanbul	Ihor Snitko (UKR)	Dragoș Coman (ROM)	Sylvain Cros (FRA)
2000 Helsinki	Ihor Chervynskyy (UKR)	Emiliano Brembilla (ITA)	Dragoș Coman (ROM)
2002 Berlin	Yury Prilukov (RUS)	Christian Minotti (ITA)	Ihor Chervynskyy (UKR)
2004 Madrid	Yury Prilukov (RUS)	Ihor Chervynskyy (UKR)	Dragoș Coman (ROM)
2006 Budapest	Yury Prilukov (RUS)	Sébastien Rouault (FRA)	Nicolas Rostoucher (FRA)
2008 Eindhoven	Yury Prilukov (RUS)	David Davies (GBR)	Mateusz Sawrymowicz (POL)
2010 Budapest	Sébastien Rouault (FRA)	Pál Joensen (FRO)	Samuel Pizzetti (ITA)
2012 Debrecen	Gregorio Paltrinieri (ITA)	Gergő Kis (HUN)	Gergely Gyurta (HUN)
2014 Berlin	Gregorio Paltrinieri (ITA)	Pál Joensen (FRO)	Gabriele Detti (ITA)
2016 London	Gregorio Paltrinieri (ITA)	Gabriele Detti (ITA)	Mykhailo Romanchuk (UKR)
2018 Glasgow	Florian Wellbrock (GER)	Mykhailo Romanchuk (UKR)	Gregorio Paltrinieri (ITA)
2020 Budapest	Mykhailo Romanchuk (UKR)	Gregorio Paltrinieri (ITA)	Domenico Acerenza (ITA)
2022 Rome	Mykhailo Romanchuk (UKR)	Gregorio Paltrinieri (ITA)	Damien Joly (FRA)
2024 Belgrade	Kuzey Tunçelli (TUR)	Mykhailo Romanchuk (UKR)	Zalán Sárkány (HUN)
2026 Paris	Johannes Liebmann (GER)	Zalán Sárkány (HUN)	Oliver Klemet (GER)

== Backstroke ==
=== 50 metre ===
Year	Gold	Silver	Bronze
1999 Istanbul	Stev Theloke (GER)	Thomas Rupprath (GER)	Mariusz Siembida (POL)
2000 Helsinki	Stev Theloke (GER)	Darius Grigalionis (LIT)	David Ortega (ESP)
2002 Berlin	Thomas Rupprath (GER)	Stev Theloke (GER)	Bartosz Kizierowski (POL)
2004 Madrid	Stev Theloke (GER)	Darius Grigalionis (LIT)	David Ortega (ESP)
2006 Budapest	Helge Meeuw (GER)	Aristeidis Grigoriadis (GRE)	Matthew Clay (GBR)
2008 Eindhoven	Aristeidis Grigoriadis (GRE)	Flori Lang (SUI)	Ľuboš Križko (SVK)
2010 Budapest	Camille Lacourt (FRA)	Liam Tancock (GBR)	Guy Barnea (ISR)
2012 Debrecen	Jonatan Kopelev (ISR)	Mirco Di Tora (ITA)	Guy Barnea (ISR)
2012 Debrecen	Jonatan Kopelev (ISR)	Mirco Di Tora (ITA)	Richárd Bohus (HUN)
2012 Debrecen	Jonatan Kopelev (ISR)	Mirco Di Tora (ITA)	Dorian Gandin (FRA)
2014 Berlin	Vladimir Morozov (RUS)	Jérémy Stravius (FRA)	Chris Walker-Hebborn (GBR)
2016 London	Camille Lacourt (FRA)	Richárd Bohus (HUN)	Grigoriy Tarasevich (RUS)
2018 Glasgow	Kliment Kolesnikov (RUS)	Robert Glință (ROU)	Shane Ryan (IRL)
2020 Budapest	Kliment Kolesnikov (RUS)	Robert Glință (ROU)	Hugo González (ESP)
2022 Rome	Apostolos Christou (GRE)	Thomas Ceccon (ITA)	Ole Braunschweig (GER)
2024 Belgrade	Apostolos Christou (GRE)	Ksawery Masiuk (POL)	Evangelos Makrygiannis (GRE)
2026 Paris	Miroslav Knedla (CZE)	Kliment Kolesnikov NAB	Pavel Samusenko NAB

=== 100 metre ===
Year	Gold	Silver	Bronze
1926 Budapest	Gustav Fröhlich (GER)	Károly Bartha (HUN)	Eskil Lundahl (SWE)
1927 Bologna	Eskil Lundahl (SWE)	Aladár Bitskey (HUN)	Gustav Fröhlich (GER)
1931 Paris	Gerhard Deutsch (GER)	Aladár Bitskey (HUN)	Károly Nagy (HUN)
1934 Magdeburg	John Besford (GBR)	Ernst Küppers (GER)	Edgar Siegrist (SUI)
1938 London	Heinz Schlauch (GER)	Gerhard Nüsske (GER)	Árpád Lengyel (HUN)
1938 London	Heinz Schlauch (GER)	Gerhard Nüsske (GER)	Stans Scheffer (NED)
1947 Monte Carlo	Georges Vallerey (FRA)	Gyula Válent (HUN)	Jirí Kovár (TCH)
1950 Vienna	Göran Larsson (SWE)	Kees Kievit (NED)	Boris Škanata (YUG)
1954 Turin	Gilbert Bozon (FRA)	László Magyar (HUN)	John Brockway (GBR)
1958 Budapest	Robert Christophe (FRA)	Leonid Barbier (URS)	Wolfgang Wagner (GDR)
1962–1966	not included in the program		
1970 Barcelona	Roland Matthes (GDR)	Santiago Esteva (ESP)	Bob Schoutsen (NED)
1974 Vienna	Roland Matthes (GDR)	Lutz Wanja (GDR)	Zoltán Verrasztó (HUN)
1977 Jönköping	Miloslav Rolko (TCH)	Zoltán Verrasztó (HUN)	Klaus Steinbach (FRG)
1981 Split	Sándor Wladár (HUN)	Vladimir Shemetov (URS)	Viktor Kuznetsov (URS)
1983 Rome	Dirk Richter (GDR)	Vladimir Shemetov (URS)	Sergei Zabolotnov (URS)
1985 Sofia	Igor Polyansky (URS)	Dirk Richter (GDR)	Sergei Zabolotnov (URS)
1987 Strasbourg	Sergei Zabolotnov (URS)	Frank Baltrusch (GDR)	Frank Hoffmeister (FRG)
1989 Bonn	Martín López-Zubero (ESP)	Sergei Zabolotnov (URS)	Dirk Richter (GDR)
1991 Athens	Martín López-Zubero (ESP)	Dirk Richter (GER)	Franck Schott (FRA)
1993 Sheffield	Martín López-Zubero (ESP)	Vladimir Selkov (RUS)	Martin Harris (GBR)
1995 Vienna	Vladimir Selkov (RUS)	Jirka Letzin (GER)	Stefaan Maene (BEL)
1997 Seville	Martín López-Zubero (ESP)	Eithan Urbach (ISR)	Vladimir Selkov (RUS)
1999 Istanbul	Stev Theloke (GER)	Gordan Kožulj (CRO)	Eithan Urbach (ISR)
2000 Helsinki	David Ortega (ESP)	Volodymyr Nikolaychuk (UKR)	Derya Büyükuncu (TUR)
2002 Berlin	Stev Theloke (GER)	Markus Rogan (AUT)	Pierre Roger (FRA)
2004 Madrid	László Cseh (HUN)	Markus Rogan (AUT)	Stev Theloke (GER)
2006 Budapest	Arkady Vyatchanin (RUS)	Markus Rogan (AUT)	Aristeidis Grigoriadis (GRE)
2008 Eindhoven	Markus Rogan (AUT)	Aristeidis Grigoriadis (GRE)	Arkady Vyatchanin (RUS)
2010 Budapest	Camille Lacourt (FRA)	Jérémy Stravius (FRA)	Liam Tancock (GBR)
2012 Debrecen	Aristeidis Grigoriadis (GRE)	Helge Meeuw (GER)	Yakov Toumarkin (ISR)
2014 Berlin	Chris Walker-Hebborn (GBR)	Jérémy Stravius (FRA)	Jan-Philip Glania (GER)
2016 London	Camille Lacourt (FRA)	Grigoriy Tarasevich (RUS)	Simone Sabbioni (ITA)
2016 London	Camille Lacourt (FRA)	Grigoriy Tarasevich (RUS)	Apostolos Christou (GRE)
2018 Glasgow	Kliment Kolesnikov (RUS)	Evgeny Rylov (RUS)	Apostolos Christou (GRE)
2020 Budapest	Robert Glință (ROU)	Hugo González (SPA)	Apostolos Christou (GRE)
2020 Budapest	Robert Glință (ROU)	Hugo González (SPA)	Yohann Ndoye-Brouard (FRA)
2022 Rome	Thomas Ceccon (ITA)	Apostolos Christou (GRE)	Yohann Ndoye-Brouard (FRA)
2024 Belgrade	Apostolos Christou (GRE)	Evangelos Makrygiannis (GRE)	Ksawery Masiuk (POL)
2026 Paris	Apostolos Christou (GRE)	Thomas Ceccon (ITA)	Pavel Samusenko NAB

=== 200 metre ===
Year	Gold	Silver	Bronze
1962 Leipzig	Leonid Barbier (URS)	Wolfgang Wagner (GDR)	József Csikány (HUN)
1966 Utrecht	Yuriy Hromak (URS)	Jaime Monzó (ESP)	Joachim Rother (GDR)
1970 Barcelona	Roland Matthes (GDR)	Santiago Esteva (ESP)	Volker Werner (GDR)
1974 Vienna	Roland Matthes (GDR)	Zoltán Verrasztó (HUN)	Róbert Rudolf (HUN)
1977 Jönköping	Zoltán Verrasztó (HUN)	Miloslav Rolko (TCH)	Jan Thorell (SWE)
1981 Split	Sándor Wladár (HUN)	Vladimir Shemetov (URS)	Frédéric Delcourt (FRA)
1983 Rome	Sergei Zabolotnov (URS)	Sándor Wladár (HUN)	Frank Baltrusch (GDR)
1985 Sofia	Igor Polyansky (URS)	Sergei Zabolotnov (URS)	Frank Baltrusch (GDR)
1987 Strasbourg	Sergei Zabolotnov (URS)	Igor Polyansky (URS)	Frank Baltrusch (GDR)
1989 Bonn	Stefano Battistelli (ITA)	Vladimir Selkov (URS)	Tino Weber (GDR)
1991 Athens	Martín López-Zubero (ESP)	Dirk Richter (GER)	none awarded
1991 Athens	Martín López-Zubero (ESP)	Vladimir Selkov (URS)	none awarded
1993 Sheffield	Vladimir Selkov (RUS)	Martín López-Zubero (ESP)	Emanuele Merisi (ITA)
1995 Vienna	Vladimir Selkov (RUS)	Nicolae Butacu (ROM)	Adam Ruckwood (GBR)
1997 Seville	Vladimir Selkov (RUS)	Emanuele Merisi (ITA)	Ralf Braun (GER)
1999 Istanbul	Ralf Braun (GER)	Gordan Kožulj (CRO)	Emanuele Merisi (ITA)
2000 Helsinki	Gordan Kožulj (CRO)	Emanuele Merisi (ITA)	Yoav Gath (ISR)
2002 Berlin	Gordan Kožulj (CRO)	Markus Rogan (AUT)	Marko Strahija (CRO)
2004 Madrid	Markus Rogan (AUT)	Răzvan Florea (ROM)	Simon Dufour (FRA)
2006 Budapest	Arkady Vyatchanin (RUS)	László Cseh (HUN)	Răzvan Florea (ROM)
2008 Eindhoven	Markus Rogan (AUT)	Arkady Vyatchanin (RUS)	Răzvan Florea (ROM)
2010 Budapest	Stanislav Donets (RUS)	Markus Rogan (AUT)	Benjamin Stasiulis (FRA)
2012 Debrecen	Radosław Kawęcki (POL)	Péter Bernek (HUN)	Yakov Toumarkin (ISR)
2014 Berlin	Radosław Kawęcki (POL)	Christian Diener (GER)	Gábor Balog (HUN)
2016 London	Radosław Kawęcki (POL)	Yakov Toumarkin (ISR)	Danas Rapšys (LTU)
2018 Glasgow	Evgeny Rylov (RUS)	Radosław Kawęcki (POL)	Matteo Restivo (ITA)
2020 Budapest	Evgeny Rylov (RUS)	Luke Greenbank (GBR)	Roman Mityukov (SUI)
2022 Rome	Yohann Ndoye-Brouard (FRA)	Benedek Kovács (HUN)	Luke Greenbank (GBR)
2024 Belgrade	Oleksandr Zheltyakov (UKR)	Apostolos Siskos (GRE)	Roman Mityukov (SUI)
2026 Paris	Hubert Kós (HUN)	Apostolos Siskos (GRE)	Thomas Ceccon (ITA)

== Breaststroke ==
=== 50 metre ===
Year	Gold	Silver	Bronze
1999 Istanbul	Mark Warnecke (GER)	Oleh Lisohor (UKR)	Károly Güttler (HUN)
2000 Helsinki	Mark Warnecke (GER)	Oleh Lisohor (UKR)	Remo Lütolf (SUI)
2002 Berlin	Oleh Lisohor (UKR)	Mihály Flaskay (HUN)	Károly Güttler (HUN)
2004 Madrid	Oleh Lisohor (UKR)	Hugues Duboscq (FRA)	Matjaž Markič (SLO)
2006 Budapest	Oleh Lisohor (UKR)	none awarded	Matjaž Markič (SLO)
2006 Budapest	Alessandro Terrin (ITA)	none awarded	Matjaž Markič (SLO)
2008 Eindhoven	Oleh Lisohor (UKR)	Alexander Dale Oen (NOR)	Alessandro Terrin (ITA)
2010 Budapest	Fabio Scozzoli (ITA)	Dragoș Agache (ROM)	Lennart Stekelenburg (NED)
2012 Debrecen	Damir Dugonjič (SLO)	Fabio Scozzoli (ITA)	Panagiotis Samilidis (GRE)
2014 Berlin	Adam Peaty (GBR)	Giedrius Titenis (LTU)	Damir Dugonjič (SLO)
2016 London	Adam Peaty (GBR)	Peter John Stevens (SLO)	Ross Murdoch (GBR)
2018 Glasgow	Adam Peaty (GBR)	Fabio Scozzoli (ITA)	Peter John Stevens (SLO)
2020 Budapest	Adam Peaty (GBR)	Ilya Shymanovich (BLR)	Nicolò Martinenghi (ITA)
2022 Rome	Nicolò Martinenghi (ITA)	Simone Cerasuolo (ITA)	Lucas Matzerath (GER)
2024 Belgrade	Emre Sakçı (TUR)	Noel de Geus (GER)	Kristian Pitshugin (ISR)
2026 Paris	Nicolò Martinenghi (ITA)	Koen de Groot (NED)	Not awarded
2026 Paris	Nicolò Martinenghi (ITA)	Simone Cerasuolo (ITA)	Not awarded

=== 100 metre ===
Year	Gold	Silver	Bronze
1970 Barcelona	Nikolai Pankin (URS)	Roger-Philippe Menu (FRA)	Rolf Klees (FRG)
1974 Vienna	Nikolai Pankin (URS)	Walter Kusch (FRG)	David Leigh (GBR)
1977 Jönköping	Gerald Mörken (FRG)	Giorgio Lalle (ITA)	Walter Kusch (FRG)
1981 Split	Yuri Kis (URS)	Arsens Miskarovs (URS)	Gerald Mörken (FRG)
1983 Rome	Robertas Žulpa (URS)	Adrian Moorhouse (GBR)	Gerald Mörken (FRG)
1985 Sofia	Adrian Moorhouse (GBR)	Rolf Beab (FRG)	Dmitry Volkov (URS)
1987 Strasbourg	Adrian Moorhouse (GBR)	Dmitry Volkov (URS)	Gianni Minervini (ITA)
1989 Bonn	Adrian Moorhouse (GBR)	Dmitry Volkov (URS)	Nick Gillingham (GBR)
1991 Athens	Norbert Rózsa (HUN)	Adrian Moorhouse (GBR)	Gianni Minervini (ITA)
1993 Sheffield	Károly Güttler (HUN)	Nick Gillingham (GBR)	Vitaly Kirinchuk (RUS)
1995 Vienna	Frédérik Deburghgraeve (BEL)	Károly Güttler (HUN)	Andrey Korneyev (RUS)
1997 Seville	Aleksandr Gukov (BLR)	Károly Güttler (HUN)	Daniel Málek (CZE)
1999 Istanbul	Domenico Fioravanti (ITA)	Mark Warnecke (GER)	Stéphan Perrot (FRA)
2000 Helsinki	Domenico Fioravanti (ITA)	Jarno Pihlava (FIN)	Dmitry Komornikov (RUS)
2002 Berlin	Oleh Lisohor (UKR)	Roman Sludnov (RUS)	Hugues Duboscq (FRA)
2004 Madrid	Oleh Lisohor (UKR)	Hugues Duboscq (FRA)	Richárd Bodor (HUN)
2006 Budapest	Roman Sludnov (RUS)	Alexander Dale Oen (NOR)	Oleh Lisohor (UKR)
2008 Eindhoven	Alexander Dale Oen (NOR)	Hugues Duboscq (FRA)	Oleh Lisohor (UKR)
2010 Budapest	Alexander Dale Oen (NOR)	Hugues Duboscq (FRA)	Fabio Scozzoli (ITA)
2012 Debrecen	Fabio Scozzoli (ITA)	Valeriy Dymo (UKR)	Mattia Pesce (ITA)
2014 Berlin	Adam Peaty (GBR)	Ross Murdoch (GBR)	Giedrius Titenis (LTU)
2016 London	Adam Peaty (GBR)	Ross Murdoch (GBR)	Giedrius Titenis (LTU)
2018 Glasgow	Adam Peaty (GBR)	James Wilby (GBR)	Anton Chupkov (RUS)
2020 Budapest	Adam Peaty (GBR)	Arno Kamminga (NED)	James Wilby (GBR)
2022 Rome	Nicolò Martinenghi (ITA)	Federico Poggio (ITA)	Andrius Šidlauskas (LTU)
2024 Belgrade	Melvin Imoudu (GER)	Berkay Ömer Öğretir (TUR)	Andrius Šidlauskas (LTU)
2026 Paris	Nicolò Martinenghi (ITA)	Ivan Kozhakin NAB	Simone Cerasuolo (ITA)

=== 200 metre ===
Year	Gold	Silver	Bronze
1926 Budapest	Erich Rademacher (GER)	Louis Van Parijs (BEL)	Wilhelm Prasse (GER)
1927 Bologna	Erich Rademacher (GER)	Wilhelm Prasse (GER)	Louis Van Parijs (BEL)
1931 Paris	Toivo Reingoldt (FIN)	Karl Wittenberg (GER)	Erwin Sietas (GER)
1934 Magdeburg	Erwin Sietas (GER)	Paul Schwarz (GER)	Hans Malmstrøm (DEN)
1938 London	Jochen Balke (GER)	Erwin Sietas (GER)	Anton Cerer (YUG)
1947 Monte Carlo	Roy Romain (GBR)	Anton Cerer (YUG)	Sándor Németh (HUN)
1950 Vienna	Herbert Klein (FRG)	Maurice Lusien (FRA)	Bengt Rask (SWE)
1954 Turin	Klaus Bodinger (GDR)	Marek Petrusewicz (POL)	Sándor Utassy (HUN)
1958 Budapest	Leonid Kolesnikov (URS)	Roberto Lazzari (ITA)	Klaus Bodinger (FRG)
1962 Leipzig	Georgy Prokopenko (URS)	Ivan Karetnikov (URS)	Rob van Empel (NED)
1966 Utrecht	Georgy Prokopenko (URS)	Aleksandr Tutakayev (URS)	Egon Henninger (GDR)
1970 Barcelona	Klaus Katzur (GDR)	Nikolai Pankin (URS)	Walter Kusch (FRG)
1974 Vienna	David Wilkie (GBR)	Nikolai Pankin (URS)	David Leigh (GBR)
1977 Jönköping	Gerald Mörken (FRG)	Arsens Miskarovs (URS)	Walter Kusch (FRG)
1981 Split	Robertas Žulpa (URS)	Arsens Miskarovs (URS)	Adrian Moorhouse (GBR)
1983 Rome	Adrian Moorhouse (GBR)	Albán Vermes (HUN)	Robertas Žulpa (URS)
1985 Sofia	Dmitry Volkov (URS)	Alexandre Yokochi (POR)	Étienne Dagon (SUI)
1987 Strasbourg	József Szabó (HUN)	Sergey Sokolovskiy (URS)	Adrian Moorhouse (GBR)
1989 Bonn	Nick Gillingham (GBR)	Gary O'Toole (IRL)	József Szabó (HUN)
1991 Athens	Nick Gillingham (GBR)	Norbert Rózsa (HUN)	Sergio López (ESP)
1993 Sheffield	Nick Gillingham (GBR)	Károly Güttler (HUN)	Andrey Korneyev (RUS)
1995 Vienna	Andrey Korneyev (RUS)	Károly Güttler (HUN)	Frédérik Deburghgraeve (BEL)
1997 Seville	Aleksandr Gukov (BLR)	Andrey Korneyev (RUS)	Daniel Málek (CZE)
1999 Istanbul	Stéphan Perrot (FRA)	Dmitry Komornikov (RUS)	Yohann Bernard (FRA)
2000 Helsinki	Dmitry Komornikov (RUS)	Domenico Fioravanti (ITA)	Maxim Podoprigora (AUT)
2002 Berlin	Davide Rummolo (ITA)	Yohann Bernard (FRA)	Roman Sludnov (RUS)
2004 Madrid	Paolo Bossini (ITA)	Dmitry Komornikov (RUS)	Richárd Bodor (HUN)
2006 Budapest	Sławomir Kuczko (POL)	Paolo Bossini (ITA)	Kristopher Gilchrist (GBR)
2008 Eindhoven	Grigory Falko (RUS)	Alexander Dale Oen (NOR)	Hugues Duboscq (FRA)
2010 Budapest	Dániel Gyurta (HUN)	Alexander Dale Oen (NOR)	Hugues Duboscq (FRA)
2012 Debrecen	Dániel Gyurta (HUN)	Marco Koch (GER)	Panagiotis Samilidis (GRE)
2014 Berlin	Marco Koch (GER)	Ross Murdoch (GBR)	Giedrius Titenis (LTU)
2016 London	Ross Murdoch (GBR)	Marco Koch (GER)	Luca Pizzini (ITA)
2018 Glasgow	Anton Chupkov (RUS)	James Wilby (GBR)	Luca Pizzini (ITA)
2020 Budapest	Anton Chupkov (RUS)	Arno Kamminga (NED)	Erik Persson (SWE)
2022 Rome	James Wilby (GBR)	Matti Mattsson (FIN)	Luca Pizzini (ITA)
2024 Belgrade	Lyubomir Epitropov (BUL)	none awarded	Jan Kałusowski (POL)
2024 Belgrade	Erik Persson (SWE)	none awarded	Jan Kałusowski (POL)
2026 Paris	Filip Nowacki (GBR)	Caspar Corbeau (NED)	Luka Mladenovic (AUT)

== Butterfly ==
=== 50 metre ===
Year	Gold	Silver	Bronze
1999 Istanbul	Pieter van den Hoogenband (NED)	Miloš Milošević (CRO)	Mark Foster (GBR)
2000 Helsinki	Jere Hård (FIN)	Lars Frölander (SWE)	Mark Foster (GBR)
2002 Berlin	Jere Hård (FIN)	Thomas Rupprath (GER)	Lars Frölander (SWE)
2004 Madrid	Serhiy Breus (UKR)	Nikolay Skvortsov (RUS)	Andriy Serdinov (UKR)
2006 Budapest	Serhiy Breus (UKR)	Duje Draganja (CRO)	Jakob Andkjær (DEN)
2008 Eindhoven	Milorad Čavić (SRB)	Serhiy Breus (UKR)	Rafael Muñoz (ESP)
2010 Budapest	Rafael Muñoz (ESP)	Frédérick Bousquet (FRA)	Yevgeny Korotyshkin (RUS)
2012 Debrecen	Rafael Muñoz (ESP)	Frédérick Bousquet (FRA)	Yauhen Tsurkin (BLR)
2014 Berlin	Florent Manaudou (FRA)	none awarded	Andriy Govorov (UKR)
2014 Berlin	Yauhen Tsurkin (BLR)	none awarded	Ben Proud (GBR)
2016 London	Andriy Govorov (UKR)	László Cseh (HUN)	Ben Proud (GBR)
2018 Glasgow	Andriy Govorov (UKR)	Ben Proud (GBR)	Oleg Kostin (RUS)
2020 Budapest	Szebasztián Szabó (HUN)	Andriy Govorov (UKR)	Andrey Zhilkin (RUS)
2022 Rome	Thomas Ceccon (ITA)	Maxime Grousset (FRA)	Diogo Ribeiro (POR)
2024 Belgrade	Stergios Marios Bilas (GRE)	Simon Bucher (AUT)	Daniel Gracík (CZE)
2026 Paris	Egor Kornev NAB	Maxime Grousset (FRA)	Hryhory Pekarski NAA

=== 100 metre ===
Year	Gold	Silver	Bronze
1970 Barcelona	Hans Lampe (FRG)	Udo Poser (GDR)	Vladimir Nemshilov (URS)
1974 Vienna	Roger Pyttel (GDR)	Roland Matthes (GDR)	Folkert Meeuw (FRG)
1977 Jönköping	Roger Pyttel (GDR)	Pär Arvidsson (SWE)	John Mills (GBR)
1981 Split	Aleksey Markovsky (URS)	Pär Arvidsson (SWE)	Vadim Dombrovskiy (URS)
1983 Rome	Michael Gross (FRG)	David López-Zubero (ESP)	Aleksey Markovsky (URS)
1985 Sofia	Michael Gross (FRG)	Andy Jameson (GBR)	Marcel Gery (TCH)
1987 Strasbourg	Andy Jameson (GBR)	Michael Gross (FRG)	Benny Nielsen (DEN)
1989 Bonn	Rafał Szukała (POL)	Bruno Gutzeit (FRA)	Martin Herrmann (FRG)
1991 Athens	Vladislav Kulikov (URS)	Martín López-Zubero (ESP)	Nils Rudolph (GER)
1993 Sheffield	Rafał Szukała (POL)	Denis Pankratov (RUS)	Miloš Milošević (CRO)
1995 Vienna	Denis Pankratov (RUS)	Denys Sylantyev (UKR)	Rafał Szukała (POL)
1997 Seville	Lars Frölander (SWE)	Denys Sylantyev (UKR)	Franck Esposito (FRA)
1999 Istanbul	Lars Frölander (SWE)	James Hickman (GBR)	Denys Sylantyev (UKR)
2000 Helsinki	Lars Frölander (SWE)	Thomas Rupprath (GER)	James Hickman (GBR)
2002 Berlin	Thomas Rupprath (GER)	Andriy Serdinov (UKR)	Denys Sylantyev (UKR)
2004 Madrid	Andriy Serdinov (UKR)	Franck Esposito (FRA)	Nikolay Skvortsov (RUS)
2006 Budapest	Andriy Serdinov (UKR)	Amaury Leveaux (FRA)	Nikolay Skvortsov (RUS)
2008 Eindhoven	Yevgeny Korotyshkin (RUS)	Peter Mankoč (SLO)	Rafael Muñoz (ESP)
2010 Budapest	Yevgeny Korotyshkin (RUS)	Joeri Verlinden (NED)	Konrad Czerniak (POL)
2012 Debrecen	Milorad Čavić (SRB)	László Cseh (HUN)	Matteo Rivolta (ITA)
2014 Berlin	Konrad Czerniak (POL)	László Cseh (HUN)	Pavel Sankovich (BLR)
2016 London	László Cseh (HUN)	Konrad Czerniak (POL)	Mehdy Metella (FRA)
2018 Glasgow	Piero Codia (ITA)	Mehdy Metella (FRA)	James Guy (GBR)
2020 Budapest	Kristóf Milák (HUN)	Josif Miladinov (BUL)	James Guy (GBR)
2022 Rome	Kristóf Milák (HUN)	Noè Ponti (SUI)	Jakub Majerski (POL)
2024 Belgrade	Kristóf Milák (HUN)	Hubert Kós (HUN)	Jakub Majerski (POL)
2026 Paris	Kristóf Milák (HUN)	Maxime Grousset (FRA)	Noè Ponti (SUI)

=== 200 metre ===
Year	Gold	Silver	Bronze
1954 Turin	György Tumpek (HUN)	Zsolt Feyér (HUN)	Vadim Martinchik (URS)
1958 Budapest	Ian Black (GBR)	Pavel Pazdírek (TCH)	Graham Symonds (GBR)
1962 Leipzig	Valentin Kuzmin (URS)	Brian Jenkins (GBR)	Wolfgang Sieber (GDR)
1966 Utrecht	Valentin Kuzmin (URS)	Horst-Günter Gregor (GDR)	Anatoly Skavronsky (URS)
1970 Barcelona	Udo Poser (GDR)	Folkert Meeuw (FRG)	Hartmut Flöckner (GDR)
1974 Vienna	András Hargitay (HUN)	Brian Brinkley (GBR)	Hartmut Flöckner (GDR)
1977 Jönköping	Michael Kraus (FRG)	Roger Pyttel (GDR)	Pär Arvidsson (SWE)
1981 Split	Michael Gross (FRG)	Philip Hubble (GBR)	Sergey Fesenko (URS)
1983 Rome	Michael Gross (FRG)	Sergey Fesenko (URS)	Paolo Revelli (ITA)
1985 Sofia	Michael Gross (FRG)	Benny Nielsen (DEN)	Frank Drost (NED)
1987 Strasbourg	Michael Gross (FRG)	Benny Nielsen (DEN)	Vadim Yaroshchuk (URS)
1989 Bonn	Tamás Darnyi (HUN)	Rafał Szukała (POL)	Matijaž Koželj (YUG)
1991 Athens	Franck Esposito (FRA)	Rafał Szukała (POL)	Christophe Bordeau (FRA)
1993 Sheffield	Denis Pankratov (RUS)	Franck Esposito (FRA)	Chris-Carol Bremer (GER)
1995 Vienna	Denis Pankratov (RUS)	Konrad Gałka (POL)	Chris-Carol Bremer (GER)
1997 Seville	Franck Esposito (FRA)	Denys Sylantyev (UKR)	Steve Parry (GBR)
1999 Istanbul	Franck Esposito (FRA)	Denys Sylantyev (UKR)	Anatoly Polyakov (RUS)
2000 Helsinki	Anatoly Polyakov (RUS)	James Hickman (GBR)	Ioan Gherghel (ROM)
2002 Berlin	Franck Esposito (FRA)	Denys Sylantyev (UKR)	Anatoly Polyakov (RUS)
2004 Madrid	Denys Sylantyev (UKR)	Ioan Gherghel (ROM)	Anatoly Polyakov (RUS)
2006 Budapest	Paweł Korzeniowski (POL)	Ioannis Drymonakos (GRE)	Nikolay Skvortsov (RUS)
2008 Eindhoven	Ioannis Drymonakos (GRE)	Paweł Korzeniowski (POL)	Nikolay Skvortsov (RUS)
2010 Budapest	Paweł Korzeniowski (POL)	Nikolay Skvortsov (RUS)	Ioannis Drymonakos (GRE)
2012 Debrecen	László Cseh (HUN)	Bence Biczó (HUN)	Ioannis Drymonakos (GRE)
2014 Berlin	Viktor Bromer (DEN)	Bence Biczó (HUN)	Paweł Korzeniowski (POL)
2016 London	László Cseh (HUN)	Viktor Bromer (DEN)	Tamás Kenderesi (HUN)
2018 Glasgow	Kristóf Milák (HUN)	Tamás Kenderesi (HUN)	Federico Burdisso (ITA)
2020 Budapest	Kristóf Milák (HUN)	Federico Burdisso (ITA)	Tamás Kenderesi (HUN)
2022 Rome	Kristóf Milák (HUN)	Richárd Márton (HUN)	Alberto Razzetti (ITA)
2024 Belgrade	Kristóf Milák (HUN)	Krzysztof Chmielewski (POL)	Michal Chmielewski (POL)
2026 Paris	Léon Marchand (FRA)	Richárd Márton (HUN)	Apostolos Siskos (GRE)

== Individual Medley ==
=== 200 metre ===
Year	Gold	Silver	Bronze
1970 Barcelona	Gunnar Larsson (SWE)	Matthias Pechmann (GDR)	Hans Ljungberg (SWE)
1974 Vienna	David Wilkie (GBR)	Christian Lietzmann (GDR)	András Hargitay (HUN)
1977 Jönköping	András Hargitay (HUN)	Andrey Smirnov (URS)	Aleksandr Sidorenko (URS)
1981 Split	Aleksandr Sidorenko (URS)	Giovanni Franceschi (ITA)	Josef Hladký (TCH)
1983 Rome	Giovanni Franceschi (ITA)	Jens-Peter Berndt (GDR)	Josef Hladký (TCH)
1985 Sofia	Tamás Darnyi (HUN)	Josef Hladký (TCH)	Peter Bermel (FRG)
1987 Strasbourg	Tamás Darnyi (HUN)	Vadim Yaroshchuk (URS)	Raik Hannemann (GDR)
1989 Bonn	Tamás Darnyi (HUN)	Raik Hannemann (GDR)	Josef Hladký (FRG)
1991 Athens	Lars Sørensen (DEN)	Christian Gessner (GER)	Luca Sacchi (ITA)
1993 Sheffield	Jani Sievinen (FIN)	Attila Czene (HUN)	Christian Keller (GER)
1995 Vienna	Jani Sievinen (FIN)	Attila Czene (HUN)	Christian Keller (GER)
1997 Seville	Marcel Wouda (NED)	Xavier Marchand (FRA)	Jani Sievinen (FIN)
1999 Istanbul	Marcel Wouda (NED)	Massimiliano Rosolino (ITA)	Jani Sievinen (FIN)
2000 Helsinki	Massimiliano Rosolino (ITA)	Christian Keller (GER)	Xavier Marchand (FRA)
2002 Berlin	Jani Sievinen (FIN)	Alessio Boggiatto (ITA)	Markus Rogan (AUT)
2004 Madrid	Markus Rogan (AUT)	Jani Sievinen (FIN)	Massimiliano Rosolino (ITA)
2006 Budapest	László Cseh (HUN)	Alessio Boggiatto (ITA)	Tamás Kerékjártó (HUN)
2008 Eindhoven	László Cseh (HUN)	Dinko Jukić (AUT)	Vytautas Janušaitis (LIT)
2010 Budapest	László Cseh (HUN)	Markus Rogan (AUT)	Joe Roebuck (GBR)
2012 Debrecen	László Cseh (HUN)	James Goddard (GBR)	Markus Rogan (AUT)
2014 Berlin	László Cseh (HUN)	Philip Heintz (GER)	Roberto Pavoni (GBR)
2016 London	Andreas Vazaios (GRE)	Gal Nevo (ISR)	Alexis Santos (POR)
2018 Glasgow	Jérémy Desplanches (SUI)	Philip Heintz (GER)	Max Litchfield (GBR)
2020 Budapest	Hugo González (SPA)	Jérémy Desplanches (SUI)	Alberto Razzetti (ITA)
2022 Rome	Hubert Kós (HUN)	Alberto Razzetti (ITA)	Gabriel Lopes (POR)
2024 Belgrade	Hubert Kós (HUN)	Ron Polonsky (ISR)	Berke Saka (TUR)
2026 Paris	Hubert Kós (HUN)	Hugo González (ESP)'	Mikhail Shcherbakov NAB

=== 400 metre ===
Year	Gold	Silver	Bronze
1962 Leipzig	Gennady Androsov (URS)	Jan Jiskoot (NED)	Jürgen Bachmann (GDR)
1966 Utrecht	Frank Wiegand (GDR)	Andrey Dunayev (URS)	Klaus Katzur (GDR)
1970 Barcelona	Gunnar Larsson (SWE)	Hans Fassnacht (FRG)	Matthias Pechmann (GDR)
1974 Vienna	András Hargitay (HUN)	Christian Lietzmann (GDR)	Andrey Smirnov (URS)
1977 Jönköping	Sergey Fesenko (URS)	Andrey Smirnov (URS)	Csaba Sós (HUN)
1981 Split	Sergey Fesenko (URS)	Leszek Górski (POL)	Giovanni Franceschi (ITA)
1983 Rome	Giovanni Franceschi (ITA)	Jens-Peter Berndt (GDR)	Josef Hladký (TCH)
1985 Sofia	Tamás Darnyi (HUN)	Vadim Yaroshchuk (URS)	Raik Hannemann (GDR)
1987 Strasbourg	Tamás Darnyi (HUN)	József Szabó (HUN)	Patrick Kühl (GDR)
1989 Bonn	Tamás Darnyi (HUN)	Patrick Kühl (GDR)	Stefano Battistelli (ITA)
1991 Athens	Luca Sacchi (ITA)	Patrick Kühl (GER)	Christian Gessner (GER)
1993 Sheffield	Tamás Darnyi (HUN)	Jani Sievinen (FIN)	Marcel Wouda (NED)
1995 Vienna	Jani Sievinen (FIN)	Marcin Maliński (POL)	Luca Sacchi (ITA)
1997 Seville	Marcel Wouda (NED)	Frederik Hviid (ESP)	Robert Seibt (GER)
1999 Istanbul	Frederik Hviid (ESP)	Michael Halika (ISR)	Marcel Wouda (NED)
2000 Helsinki	István Batházi (HUN)	Cezar Bădiță (ROM)	Johann Le Bihan (FRA)
2002 Berlin	Alessio Boggiatto (ITA)	István Batházi (HUN)	Nicolas Rostoucher (FRA)
2004 Madrid	László Cseh (HUN)	Luca Marin (ITA)	Alessio Boggiatto (ITA)
2006 Budapest	László Cseh (HUN)	Luca Marin (ITA)	Alessio Boggiatto (ITA)
2008 Eindhoven	László Cseh (HUN)	Ioannis Drymonakos (GRE)	Luca Marin (ITA)
2010 Budapest	László Cseh (HUN)	Dávid Verrasztó (HUN)	Gal Nevo (ISR)
2012 Debrecen	László Cseh (HUN)	Dávid Verrasztó (HUN)	Ioannis Drymonakos (GRE)
2014 Berlin	Dávid Verrasztó (HUN)	Roberto Pavoni (GBR)	Federico Turrini (ITA)
2016 London	Dávid Verrasztó (HUN)	Richard Nagy (SVK)	Federico Turrini (ITA)
2018 Glasgow	Dávid Verrasztó (HUN)	Max Litchfield (GBR)	Joan Lluís Pons (ESP)
2020 Budapest	Ilya Borodin (RUS)	Alberto Razzetti (ITA)	Max Litchfield (GBR)
2022 Rome	Alberto Razzetti (ITA)	Dávid Verrasztó (HUN)	Pier Andrea Matteazzi (ITA)
2024 Belgrade	Apostolos Papastamos (GRE)	Balázs Holló (HUN)	Gábor Zombori (HUN)
2026 Paris	Ilya Borodin NAB	Alberto Razzetti (ITA)	Max Litchfield (GBR)

== Relays ==
=== 4 × 100 metre freestyle ===
Year	Gold	Silver	Bronze
1962 Leipzig	France; Alain Gottvallès; Jean-Pascal Curtillet; Robert Christophe; Gérard Gropaiz	Great Britain; Bob McGregor; John Martin-Dye; Peter Kendrew; Stanley Clarke	Sweden; Bengt-olof Nordvall; Jan Lundin; Mats Svensson; Per-Ola Lindberg
1966 Utrecht	East Germany; Frank Wiegand; Udo Poser; Horst-Günter Gregor; Peter Sommer	Soviet Union; Leonid Ilyichov; Viktor Mazanov; Georgi Kulikov; Vladimir Shuvalov	Sweden; Lester Eriksson; Göran Jansson; Ingvar Eriksson; Jan Lundin
1970 Barcelona	Soviet Union; Vladimir Bure; Viktor Mazanov; Georgi Kulikov; Leonid Ilyichov	West Germany; Gerhard Schiller; Rainer Jacob; Folkert Meeuw; Hans Fassnacht	East Germany; Roland Matthes; Lutz Unger; Frank Seebald; Udo Poser
1974 Vienna	West Germany; Klaus Steinbach; Gerhard Schiller; Kersten Meier; Peter Nocke	Soviet Union; Vladimir Bure; Aleksandr Samsonov; Anatoly Rybakov; Georgi Kulikov	East Germany; Roger Pyttel; Roland Matthes; Wilfried Hartung; Lutz Wanja
1977 Jönköping	West Germany; Klaus Steinbach; Andreas Schmidt; Jürgen Könnecker; Peter Nocke	Italy; Roberto Pangaro; Paolo Revelli; Paolo Sinegaelia; Marcello Guarducci	Soviet Union; Vladimir Bure; Sergey Labso; Sergey Koplyakov; Andrey Krylov
1981 Split	Soviet Union; Vladimir Shemetov; Vladimir Salnikov; Aleksandr Chayev; Sergey Koplyakov	Sweden; Per Holmertz; Per Wikström; Lasse Lindqvist; Per Johansson	West Germany; Peter Knust; Wilfried Kuhlem; Michael Gross; Andreas Schmidt
1983 Rome	Soviet Union; Sergey Smiryagin; Serhiy Krasyuk; Volodymyr Tkachenko; Aleksey Markovsky	Sweden; Thomas Lejdström; Per Johansson; Per Holmertz; Per Wikström	East Germany; Jörg Woithe; Dirk Richter; Rainer Sternal; Sven Lodziewski
1985 Sofia	West Germany; Alexander Schowtka; Thomas Fahrner; Dirk Korthals; Michael Gross	East Germany; Dirk Richter; Sven Lodziewski; Lars Hinneburg; Jörg Woithe	Sweden; Tommy Werner; Michael Söderlund; Bengt Baron; Per Johansson
1987 Strasbourg	East Germany; Dirk Richter; Thomas Flemming; Steffen Zesner; Sven Lodziewski	West Germany; Peter Sitt; Michael Gross; Rolf-Dieter Maltzann; Thomas Fahrner	Soviet Union; Gennadiy Prigoda; Vladimir Shemetov; Veniamin Tayanovich; Volodymyr Tkachenko
1989 Bonn	West Germany; Peter Sitt; André Schadt; Bengt Zikarsky; Björn Zikarsky	France; Stéphan Caron; Christophe Kalfayan; Laurent Neuville; Bruno Gutzeit	Sweden; Tommy Werner; Anders Holmertz; Håkan Karlsson; Joakim Holmquist
1991 Athens	Soviet Union; Pavlo Khnykin; Gennadiy Prigoda; Veniamin Tayanovich; Aleksandr Popov	Germany; Silko Günzel; Nils Rudolph; Steffen Zesner; Dirk Richter	Sweden; Tommy Werner; Göran Titus; Anders Holmertz; Göran Jansson
1993 Sheffield	Russia; Vladimir Predkin; Vladimir Pyshnenko; Yevgeny Sadovyi; Aleksandr Popov	Sweden; Fredrik Letzler; Tommy Werner; Lars Frölander; Anders Holmertz	Germany; Christian Tröger; Jochen Bludau; Steffen Zesner; Bengt Zikarsky
1995 Vienna	Russia; Vladimir Predkin; Roman Shchegolev; Roman Yegorov; Aleksandr Popov	Germany; Christian Tröger; Christian Keller; Torsten Spanneberg; Björn Zikarsky	Sweden; Lars Frölander; Christer Wallin; Fredrik Letzler; Anders Holmertz
1997 Seville	Russia; Aleksandr Popov; Roman Yegorov; Denis Pimankov; Vladimir Pyshnenko	Germany; Alexander Lüderitz; Steffen Zesner; Christian Tröger; Torsten Spanneberg	Netherlands; Bram van Haandel; Martijn Zuijdweg; Mark Veens; Pieter van den Hoogenband
1999 Istanbul	Netherlands; Johan Kenkhuis; Mark Veens; Marcel Wouda; Pieter van den Hoogenband	Russia; Denis Pimankov; Sergey Asyikhmin; Dmitry Chernyshyov; Aleksandr Popov	Germany; Christian Keller; Lars Merseburg; Christian Tröger; Lars Conrad
2000 Helsinki	Russia; Denis Pimankov; Dmitry Chernyshyov; Andrey Kapralov; Aleksandr Popov	Germany; Stefan Herbst; Lars Conrad; Christian Tröger; Stephan Kunzelmann	France; Romain Barnier; Nicolas Kintz; Hugo Viart; Frédérick Bousquet
2002 Berlin	Germany; Lars Conrad; Stefan Herbst; Torsten Spanneberg; Stephan Kunzelmann	Sweden; Erik la Fleur; Stefan Nystrand; Lars Frölander; Mattias Ohlin	Italy; Lorenzo Vismara; Christian Galenda; Michele Garcia; Simone Cercato
2004 Madrid	Italy; Lorenzo Vismara; Christian Galenda; Giacomo Vassanelli; Filippo Magnini	Russia; Andrey Kapralov; Yevgeny Lagunov; Ivan Usov; Denis Pimankov	France; Amaury Leveaux; Germain Cayette; Julien Sicot; Fabien Gilot
2006 Budapest	Italy; Alessandro Calvi; Christian Galenda; Lorenzo Vismara; Filippo Magnini	Russia; Yevgeny Lagunov; Andrey Grechin; Ivan Usov; Andrey Kapralov	France; Alain Bernard; Grégory Mallet; Fabien Gilot; Amaury Leveaux
2008 Eindhoven	Sweden; Marcus Piehl; Stefan Nystrand; Petter Stymne; Jonas Persson	Italy; Massimiliano Rosolino; Alessandro Calvi; Christian Galenda; Filippo Magnini	Netherlands; Mitja Zastrow; Bas van Velthoven; Robert Lijesen; Pieter van den Hoogenband
2010 Budapest	Russia; Yevgeny Lagunov; Andrey Grechin; Nikita Lobintsev; Danila Izotov	France; Fabien Gilot; Yannick Agnel; William Meynard; Alain Bernard	Sweden; Stefan Nystrand; Lars Frölander; Robin Andreasson; Jonas Persson
2012 Debrecen	France; Amaury Leveaux; Alain Bernard; Frédérick Bousquet; Jérémy Stravius	Italy; Andrea Rolla; Marco Orsi; Michele Santucci; Filippo Magnini	Russia; Vitaly Syrnikov; Oleg Tikhobaev; Nikita Konovalov; Viacheslav Andrusenko
2014 Berlin	France; Mehdy Metella; Fabien Gilot; Florent Manaudou; Jérémy Stravius	Russia; Andrey Grechin; Nikita Lobintsev; Alexandr Sukhorukov; Vladimir Morozov	Italy; Luca Dotto; Marco Orsi; Luca Leonardi; Filippo Magnini
2016 London	France; William Meynard; Florent Manaudou; Fabien Gilot; Clément Mignon	Italy; Luca Dotto; Luca Leonardi; Jonathan Boffa; Filippo Magnini	Belgium; Glenn Surgeloose; Jasper Aerents; Dieter Dekoninck; Pieter Timmers
2018 Glasgow	Russia; Evgeny Rylov; Danila Izotov; Vladimir Morozov; Kliment Kolesnikov	Italy; Luca Dotto; Ivano Vendrame; Lorenzo Zazzeri; Alessandro Miressi	Poland; Jan Świtkowski; Konrad Czerniak; Jakub Kraska; Kacper Majchrzak
2020 Budapest	Russia; Andrey Minakov; Aleksandr Shchegolev; Vladislav Grinev; Kliment Kolesnikov	Great Britain; Tom Dean; Matt Richards; James Guy; Duncan Scott	Italy; Alessandro Miressi; Lorenzo Zazzeri; Thomas Ceccon; Manuel Frigo
2022 Rome	Italy; Alessandro Miressi; Thomas Ceccon; Lorenzo Zazzeri; Manuel Frigo	Hungary; Nándor Németh; Szebasztián Szabó; Dániel Mészáros; Kristóf Milák	Great Britain; Jacob Whittle; Matthew Richards; Thomas Dean; Edward Mildred
2024 Belgrade	Serbia; Velimir Stjepanović; Nikola Aćin; Justin Cvetkov; Andrej Barna	Poland; Mateusz Chowaniec; Dominik Dudys; Ksawery Masiuk; Kamil Sieradzki	Greece; Apostolos Christou; Stergios Marios Bilas; Kristian Gkolomeev; Andreas Vazaios
2026 Paris	Hungary; Hubert Kós; Szebasztián Szabó; Nándor Németh; Kristóf Milák; Olivér Kós; Ádám Jászó	Neutral Athletes B Ivan Giryov; Vasilii Kukushkin; Aleksandr Shchegolev; Egor Kornev; Mikhail Shcherbakov; Roman Zhidkov; Andrey Minakov	Croatia; Jere Hribar; Vlaho Nenadić; Vili Sivec; Toni Dragoja

=== 4 × 200 metre freestyle ===
Year	Gold	Silver	Bronze
1926 Budapest	Germany; August Heitmann; Joachim Rademacher; Friedel Berges; Herbert Heinrich	Hungary; Zoltán Bitskey; András Wanié; Géza Szigritz; István Bárány	Sweden; Åke Borg; Arne Borg; Eskil Lundahl; Georg Werner
1927 Bologna	Germany; August Heitmann; Joachim Rademacher; Friedel Berges; Herbert Heinrich	Sweden; Åke Borg; Aulo Gustafsson; Eskil Lundahl; Arne Borg	Hungary; Géza Szigritz; Rezső Wanié; András Wanié; István Bárány
1931 Paris	Hungary; András Wanié; László Szabados; András Székely; István Bárány	Germany; Karl Schubert; Raymond Deiters; Hans Balk; Herbert Heinrich	Italy; Antonio Conelli; Sirio Bianchini; Ettore Baldo; Paolo Costoli
1934 Magdeburg	Hungary; Ödön Gróf; András Maróthy; Ferenc Csik; Árpád Lengyel	Germany; Heiko Schwartz; Wolfgang Leisewitz; Otto Lenkitsch; Otto Wille	Italy; Massimo Costa; Giacomo Signori; Guido Giunta; Paolo Costoli
1938 London	Germany; Werner Birr; Wolfgang Heimlich; Hans Freese; Werner Plath	France; Roland Pallard; Christian Talli; René Cavalero; Alfred Nakache	Great Britain; Frederick Dove; Kenneth Deane; Bob Leivers; Norman Wainwright
1947 Monte Carlo	Sweden; Per-Olof Olsson; Martin Lundén; Per-Olof Östrand; Olle Johansson	France; Alex Jany; Charles Babey; Georges Vallerey; Jean Vallerey	Hungary; Imre Nyéki; Géza Kádas; György Mitró; Elemér Szathmáry
1950 Vienna	Sweden; Tore Sjunnerholm; Per-Olof Östrand; Olle Johansson; Göran Larsson	France; Willy Blioch; Joseph Bernardo; Jean Boiteux; Alex Jany	Yugoslavia; Branko Vidović; Andrej Quinz; Mislav Stipetić; Marijan Stipetić
1954 Turin	Hungary; László Till; Zoltán Dömötör; Géza Kádas; Imre Nyéki	France; Jean Boiteux; Gilbert Bozon; Guy Montserret; Aldo Eminente	Soviet Union; Nikolay Suhorukov; Vyacheslav Kurennoy; Yuriy Abovyan; Lev Balandin
1958 Budapest	Soviet Union; Gennady Nikolayev; Vladimir Struzhanov; Igor Luzhkovsky; Boris Nikitin	Italy; Fritz Dennerlein; Paolo Galletti; Angelo Romani; Paolo Pucci	Hungary; József Katona; Imre Nyéki; György Müller; Gyula Dobay
1962 Leipzig	Sweden; Hans Rosendahl; Per-Ola Lindberg; Mats Svensson; Lars-Erik Bengtsson	France; Gérard Gropez; Alain Gottvallès; Jean-Pascal Curtillet; Robert Christophe	East Germany; Joachim Herbst; Martin Klink; Frank Wiegand; Volker Frischke
1966 Utrecht	Soviet Union; Leonid Ilyichov; Semyon Belits-Geiman; Aleksandr Pletnev; Yevgeny Novikov	East Germany; Horst-Günter Gregor; Alfred Müller; Udo Poser; Frank Wiegand	Sweden; Lester Eriksson; Olle Ferm; Ingvar Eriksson; Jan Lundin
1970 Barcelona	West Germany; Werner Lampe; Olaf von Schilling; Folkert Meeuw; Hans Fassnacht	Soviet Union; Georgi Kulikov; Ahmed Anarbayev; Aleksandr Samsonov; Vladimir Bure	East Germany; Lutz Unger; Wilfried Hartung; Roland Matthes; Udo Poser
1974 Vienna	West Germany; Klaus Steinbach; Werner Lampe; Folkert Meeuw; Peter Nocke	Soviet Union; Aleksandr Samsonov; Andrey Krylov; Viktor Aboimov; Georgi Kulikov	Sweden; Bernt Zarnowiecki; Anders Bellbring; Peter Pettersson; Bengt Gingsjö
1977 Jönköping	Soviet Union; Volodymyr Raskatov; Sergey Rusin; Sergey Koplyakov; Andrey Krylov	West Germany; Frank Wennmann; Klaus Steinbach; Peter Knust; Peter Nocke	East Germany; Rainer Strohbach; Roger Pyttel; Detlev Grabs; Frank Pfütze
1981 Split	Soviet Union; Vladimir Shemetov; Vladimir Salnikov; Aleksandr Chayev; Sergey Koplyakov	West Germany; Michael Gross; Gerald Schlupp; Andreas Schmidt; Frank Wennmann	Sweden; Michael Söderlund; Per Wikström; Per-Alvar Magnusson; Thomas Lejdström
1983 Rome	West Germany; Thomas Fahrner; Alexander Schowtka; Andreas Schmidt; Michael Gross	East Germany; Dirk Richter; Jörg Woithe; Rainer Sternal; Sven Lodziewski	Italy; Paolo Revelli; Marcello Guarducci; Raffaele Franceschi; Fabrizio Rampazzi
1985 Sofia	West Germany; Alexander Schowtka; Michael Gross; André Schadt; Thomas Fahrner	Sweden; Anders Holmertz; Per Johansson; Michael Söderlund; Tommy Werner	Netherlands; Edsard Schlingemann; Hans Kroes; Patrick Dybiona; Frank Drost
1987 Strasbourg	West Germany; Peter Sitt; Rainer Henkel; Thomas Fahrner; Michael Gross	East Germany; Lars Hinneburg; Thomas Flemming; Steffen Zesner; Sven Lodziewski	Sweden; Tommy Werner; Michael Söderlund; Anders Holmertz; Markus Eriksson
1989 Bonn	Italy; Massimo Trevisan; Roberto Gleria; Giorgio Lamberti; Stefano Battistelli	West Germany; Peter Sitt; Martin Herrmann; Erik Hochstein; Stefan Pfeiffer	East Germany; Uwe Dassler; Andree Matzk; Thomas Flemming; Steffen Zesner
1991 Athens	Soviet Union; Dmitry Lepikov; Vladimir Pyshnenko; Veniamin Tayanovich; Yevgeny Sadovyi	Italy; Emanuele Idini; Roberto Gleria; Stefano Battistelli; Giorgio Lamberti	Germany; Steffen Zesner; Uwe Dassler; Christian Keller; Jörg Hoffmann
1993 Sheffield	Russia; Dmitry Lepikov; Vladimir Pyshnenko; Yury Mukhin; Yevgeny Sadovyi	Germany; Jörg Hoffmann; Christian Tröger; Christian Keller; Steffen Zesner	France; Christophe Marchand; Yann de Fabrique; Lionel Poirot; Christophe Bordeau
1995 Vienna	Germany; Christian Keller; Oliver Lampe; Torsten Spanneberg; Steffen Zesner	Sweden; Christer Wallin; Anders Holmertz; Lars Frölander; Chris Eliasson	Italy; Massimiliano Rosolino; Piermaria Siciliano; Emanuele Merisi; Emanuele Idini
1997 Seville	Great Britain; Paul Palmer; Andrew Clayton; Gavin Meadows; James Salter	Netherlands; Pieter van den Hoogenband; Mark van der Zijden; Martijn Zuijdweg; Marcel Wouda	Germany; Lars Conrad; Christian Keller; Stefan Pohl; Steffen Zesner
1999 Istanbul	Germany; Christian Keller; Stefan Pohl; Lars Conrad; Michael Kiedel	Great Britain; Paul Palmer; Gavin Meadows; James Salter; Edward Sinclair	Russia; Maksim Korshunov; Dmitriy Kuzmin; Andrey Kapralov; Dmitry Chernyshyov
2000 Helsinki	Italy; Massimiliano Rosolino; Matteo Pelliciari; Simone Cercato; Emiliano Brembilla	Germany; Michael Kiedel; Christian Keller; Stefan Herbst; Stefan Pohl	Netherlands; Martijn Zuijdweg; Marcel Wouda; Mark van der Zijden; Pieter van den Hoogenband
2002 Berlin	Italy; Matteo Pelliciari; Emiliano Brembilla; Federico Cappellazzo; Massimiliano Rosolino	Germany; Moritz Zimmer; Stefan Pohl; Lars Conrad; Stefan Herbst	Greece; Thanasis Oikonomou; Nikos Xylouris; Ioannis Kokkodis; Spyridon Gianniotis
2004 Madrid	Italy; Emiliano Brembilla; Matteo Pelliciari; Massimiliano Rosolino; Filippo Magnini	Russia; Maksim Kuznetsov; Yevgeniy Natsvin; Andrey Kapralov; Yury Prilukov	France; Fabien Horth; Nicolas Kintz; Nicolas Rostoucher; Amaury Leveaux
2006 Budapest	Italy; Massimiliano Rosolino; David Berbotto; Nicola Cassio; Filippo Magnini	Great Britain; David Carry; Simon Burnett; Andrew Hunter; Ross Davenport	Greece; Andreas Zisimos; Georgios Demetis; Dimitrios Manganas; Nikos Xylouris
2008 Eindhoven	Italy; Emiliano Brembilla; Massimiliano Rosolino; Nicola Cassio; Filippo Magnini	Russia; Nikita Lobintsev; Alexandr Sukhorukov; Yevgeny Lagunov; Yury Prilukov	Austria; Dominik Koll; Markus Rogan; David Brandl; Dinko Jukić
2010 Budapest	Russia; Nikita Lobintsev; Danila Izotov; Sergey Perunin; Alexandr Sukhorukov	Germany; Paul Biedermann; Tim Wallburger; Robin Backhaus; Clemens Rapp	France; Yannick Agnel; Clément Lefert; Antton Harambouré; Jérémy Stravius
2012 Debrecen	Germany; Paul Biedermann; Dimitri Colupaev; Clemens Rapp; Tim Wallburger	Italy; Gianluca Maglia; Riccardo Maestri; Samuel Pizzetti; Filippo Magnini	Hungary; Dominik Kozma; Gergő Kis; Péter Bernek; László Cseh
2014 Berlin	Germany; Robin Backhaus; Yannick Lebherz; Clemens Rapp; Paul Biedermann	Russia; Artem Lobuzov; Dmitry Ermakov; Aleksandr Krasnykh; Alexandr Sukhorukov	Belgium; Louis Croenen; Glenn Surgeloose; Emmanuel Vanluchene; Pieter Timmers
2016 London	Netherlands; Dion Dreesens; Maarten Brzoskowski; Kyle Stolk; Sebastiaan Verschuren	Belgium; Louis Croenen; Glenn Surgeloose; Dieter Dekoninck; Pieter Timmers	Italy; Mitch D'Arrigo; Filippo Magnini; Luca Dotto; Gabriele Detti
2018 Glasgow	Great Britain; Calum Jarvis; Duncan Scott; Tom Dean; James Guy	Russia; Mikhail Vekovishchev; Martin Malyutin; Danila Izotov; Mikhail Dovgalyuk	Italy; Alessio Proietti Colonna; Filippo Megli; Matteo Ciampi; Mattia Zuin
2020 Budapest	Russia; Martin Malyutin; Aleksandr Shchegolev; Aleksandr Krasnykh; Mikhail Vekovishchev	Great Britain; Tom Dean; Matt Richards; James Guy; Duncan Scott	Italy; Stefano Ballo; Matteo Ciampi; Marco De Tullio; Stefano Di Cola
2022 Rome	Hungary; Nándor Németh; Richárd Márton; Balázs Holló; Kristóf Milák	Italy; Marco De Tullio; Lorenzo Galossi; Gabriele Detti; Stefano Di Cola	France; Hadrien Salvan; Wissam-Amazigh Yebba; Enzo Tesic; Roman Fuchs
2024 Belgrade	Lithuania; Tomas Navikonis; Tomas Lukminas; Kristupas Trepočka; Danas Rapšys	Hungary; Nándor Németh; Balázs Holló; Richárd Márton; Hubert Kós	Greece; Dimitrios Markos; Konstantinos Englezakis; Konstantinos Emmanouil Stamou; Andreas Vazaios
2026 Paris	Great Britain; Matthew Richards; Jack McMillan; James Guy; Duncan Scott; Tyler Melbourne-Smith; Thomas Dean; Gabriel Shepherd	France; Léon Marchand; Pierre Largeron; Sauveur Cristofini; Roman Fuchs; Néo Dutriaux	Germany; Lukas Märtens; Timo Sorgius; Jarno Baschnitt; Cornelius Jahn

=== 4 × 100 metre medley ===
Year	Gold	Silver	Bronze
1958 Budapest	Soviet Union; Leonid Barbier; Vladimir Minashkin; Vitaliy Chenenkov; Viktor Konoplyov	Hungary; László Magyar; György Kunsági; György Tumpek; Gyula Dobay	Italy; Gilberto Elsa; Roberto Lazzari; Fritz Dennerlein; Paolo Rocco
1962 Leipzig	East Germany; Jürgen Dietze; Egon Henninger; Horst-Günter Gregor; Frank Wiegand	Soviet Union; Veliko Siymar; Leonid Kolesnikov; Valentin Kuzmin; Viktor Konoplyov	Netherlands; Jan Weeteling; Wieger Mensonides; Jan Jiskoot; Ron Kroon
1966 Utrecht	Soviet Union; Viktor Mazanov; Georgy Prokopenko; Valentin Kuzmin; Leonid Ilyichov	East Germany; Jürgen Dietze; Egon Henninger; Horst-Günter Gregor; Frank Wiegand	Hungary; József Csikány; Ferenc Lenkei; Ákos Gulyás; István Szentirmay
1970 Barcelona	East Germany; Roland Matthes; Klaus Katzur; Udo Poser; Lutz Unger	France; Jean-Paul Berjeau; Roger-Philippe Menu; Alain Mosconi; Michel Rousseau	Soviet Union; Viktor Krasko; Nikolai Pankin; Vladimir Nemshilov; Leonid Ilyichov
1974 Vienna	West Germany; Klaus Steinbach; Walter Kusch; Folkert Meeuw; Peter Nocke	Great Britain; Colin Cunningham; David Wilkie; Stephen Nash; Brian Brinkley	Soviet Union; Igor Potyakin; Nikolai Pankin; Viktor Sharygin; Vladimir Bure
1977 Jönköping	West Germany; Klaus Steinbach; Gerald Mörken; Michael Kraus; Peter Nocke	East Germany; Lutz Wanja; Gregor Arnicke; Roger Pyttel; René Pläschke	Great Britain; James Carter; Duncan Goodhew; John Mills; Martin Smith
1981 Split	Soviet Union; Viktor Kuznetsov; Yuri Kis; Aleksey Markovsky; Serhiy Krasyuk	Sweden; Bengt Baron; Glen Christiansen; Pär Arvidsson; Per Johansson	East Germany; Dirk Richter; Sigurd Hanke; Olaf Ziesche; Jörg Woithe
1983 Rome	Soviet Union; Vladimir Shemetov; Robertas Žulpa; Aleksey Markovsky; Sergey Smiryagin	West Germany; Stefan Peter; Gerard Mörken; Michael Gross; Andreas Schmidt	East Germany; Dirk Richter; Sigurd Hanke; Andreas Ott; Jörg Woithe
1985 Sofia	West Germany; Thomas Lebherz; Rolf Beab; Michael Gross; Alexander Schowtka	East Germany; Dirk Richter; Ingo Grzywolz; Thomas Dreßler; Jörg Woithe	Italy; Mauro Marini; Gianni Minervini; Fabrizio Rampazzi; Andrea Ceccarini
1987 Strasbourg	Soviet Union; Igor Polyansky; Dmitry Volkov; Konstantin Petrov; Gennadiy Prigoda	Great Britain; Neil Cochran; Adrian Moorhouse; Andy Jameson; Roland Lee	East Germany; Frank Baltrusch; Christian Poswiat; Thomas Dreßler; Sven Lodziewski
1989 Bonn	Soviet Union; Sergei Zabolotnov; Dmitry Volkov; Vadim Yaroshchuk; Yuri Bashkatov	France; Franck Schott; Cédric Pénicaud; Bruno Gutzeit; Stéphan Caron	Italy; Stefano Battistelli; Gianni Minervini; Marco Braida; Giorgio Lamberti
1991 Athens	Soviet Union; Vladimir Selkov; Dmitry Volkov; Vladislav Kulikov; Aleksandr Popov	France; Franck Schott; Cédric Pénicaud; Bruno Gutzeit; Christophe Kalfayan	Hungary; Tamás Deutsch; Norbert Rózsa; Péter Horváth; Béla Szabados
1993 Sheffield	Russia; Vladimir Selkov; Vitaly Kirinchuk; Denis Pankratov; Aleksandr Popov	Hungary; Tamás Deutsch; Károly Güttler; Péter Horváth; Béla Szabados	Great Britain; Martin Harris; Nick Gillingham; Mike Fibbens; Mark Foster
1995 Vienna	Russia; Vladimir Selkov; Andrey Korneyev; Denis Pankratov; Aleksandr Popov	Hungary; Tamás Deutsch; Károly Güttler; Péter Horváth; Attila Czene	Germany; Tino Weber; Mark Warnecke; Fabian Hieronimus; Björn Zikarsky
1997 Seville	Russia; Vladimir Selkov; Andrey Korneyev; Vladislav Kulikov; Aleksandr Popov	Germany; Ralf Braun; Jens Kruppa; Thomas Rupprath; Christian Tröger	Poland; Mariusz Siembida; Marek Krawczyk; Marcin Kaczmarek; Bartosz Kizierowski
1999 Istanbul	Netherlands; Klaas-Erik Zwering; Marcel Wouda; Stefan Aartsen; Pieter van den Hoogenband	Germany; Stev Theloke; Mark Warnecke; Christian Keller; Christian Tröger	Russia; Sergey Ostapchuk; Dmitry Komornikov; Vladislav Kulikov; Aleksandr Popov
2000 Helsinki	Russia; Vladislav Aminov; Dmitry Komornikov; Dmitry Chernyshyov; Aleksandr Popov	Sweden; Mattias Ohlin; Martin Gustavsson; Lars Frölander; Stefan Nystrand	Ukraine; Volodymyr Nikolaychuk; Oleh Lisohor; Andriy Serdinov; Pavlo Khnykin
2002 Berlin	Russia; Evgeny Aleshin; Roman Sludnov; Igor Marchenko; Aleksandr Popov	France; Pierre Roger; Hugues Duboscq; Franck Esposito; Romain Barnier	Germany; Stev Theloke; Jens Kruppa; Thomas Rupprath; Stefan Herbst
2004 Madrid	Ukraine; Volodymyr Nikolaychuk; Oleh Lisohor; Andriy Serdinov; Yuriy Yegoshin	France; Simon Dufour; Hugues Duboscq; Franck Esposito; Julien Sicot	Hungary; László Cseh; Richárd Bodor; Zsolt Gáspár; Attila Zubor
2006 Budapest	Russia; Arkady Vyatchanin; Roman Sludnov; Nikolay Skvortsov; Andrey Kapralov	Ukraine; Andriy Oleynyk; Oleh Lisohor; Andriy Serdinov; Yuriy Yegoshin	Great Britain; Liam Tancock; James Gibson; Todd Cooper; Simon Burnett
2008 Eindhoven	Russia; Arkady Vyatchanin; Grigory Falko; Yevgeny Korotyshkin; Andrey Grechin	Croatia; Gordan Kožulj; Vanja Rogulj; Mario Todorović; Duje Draganja	Sweden; Simon Sjödin; Jonas Andersson; Lars Frölander; Stefan Nystrand
2010 Budapest	France; Camille Lacourt; Hugues Duboscq; Frédérick Bousquet; Fabien Gilot	Russia; Stanislav Donets; Roman Sludnov; Yevgeny Korotyshkin; Yevgeny Lagunov	Netherlands; Nick Driebergen; Lennart Stekelenburg; Joeri Verlinden; Sebastiaan Verschuren
2012 Debrecen	Italy; Mirco Di Tora; Fabio Scozzoli; Matteo Rivolta; Filippo Magnini	Germany; Helge Meeuw; Christian vom Lehn; Steffen Deibler; Marco di Carli	Hungary; Péter Bernek; Dániel Gyurta; László Cseh; Dominik Kozma
2014 Berlin	Great Britain; Chris Walker-Hebborn; Adam Peaty; Adam Barrett; Ben Proud	France; Jérémy Stravius; Giacomo Perez-Dortona; Mehdy Metella; Fabien Gilot	Hungary; László Cseh; Dániel Gyurta; Bence Pulai; Dominik Kozma
2016 London	Great Britain; Chris Walker-Hebborn; Adam Peaty; James Guy; Duncan Scott	France; Benjamin Stasiulis; Giacomo Perez-Dortona; Mehdy Metella; Florent Manaudou	Hungary; Gábor Balog; Gábor Financsek; László Cseh; Richárd Bohus
2018 Glasgow	Great Britain; Nicholas Pyle; Adam Peaty; James Guy; Duncan Scott	Russia; Kliment Kolesnikov; Anton Chupkov; Egor Kuimov; Vladimir Morozov	Germany; Christian Diener; Fabian Schwingenschlögl; Marius Kusch; Damian Wierling
2020 Budapest	Great Britain; Luke Greenbank; Adam Peaty; James Guy; Duncan Scott	Russia; Kliment Kolesnikov; Kirill Prigoda; Mikhail Vekovishchev; Andrey Minakov	Italy; Thomas Ceccon; Nicolò Martinenghi; Federico Burdisso; Alessandro Miressi
2022 Rome	Italy; Thomas Ceccon; Nicolò Martinenghi; Matteo Rivolta; Alessandro Miressi	France; Yohann Ndoye-Brouard; Antoine Viquerat; Clément Secchi; Maxime Grousset	Austria; Bernhard Reitshammer; Valentin Bayer; Simon Bucher; Heiko Gigler
2024 Belgrade	Austria; Bernhard Reitshammer; Valentin Bayer; Simon Bucher; Heiko Gigler	Poland; Ksawery Masiuk; Jan Kalusowski; Jakub Majerski; Kamil Sieradzki	Ukraine; Oleksandr Zheltiakov; Volodymyr Lisovets; Arsenii Kovalov; Illia Linnyk
2026 Paris	Neutral Athletes B Kliment Kolesnikov; Ivan Kozhakin; Andrey Minakov; Egor Kornev; Pavel Samusenko; Kirill Prigoda; Roman Shevliakov; Vasilii Kukushkin	Italy; Thomas Ceccon; Nicolò Martinenghi; Alberto Razzetti; Carlos D'Ambrosio; Michele Lamberti; Michele Busa	France; Yohann Ndoye-Brouard; Carl Aitkaci; Léon Marchand; Maxime Grousset; Mewen Tomac; Amaury Albar; Cédric Gabali

=== 4 × 100 metre mixed freestyle ===
Year	Gold	Silver	Bronze
2014 Berlin	Italy; Luca Dotto; Luca Leonardi; Erika Ferraioli; Giada Galizi	Russia; Andrey Grechin; Vladimir Morozov; Veronika Andrusenko; Margarita Nesterova	France; Clément Mignon; Grégory Mallet; Anna Santamans; Coralie Balmy
2016 London	Netherlands; Sebastiaan Verschuren; Ben Schwietert; Maud van der Meer; Ranomi Kromowidjojo	Italy; Filippo Magnini; Luca Dotto; Erika Ferraioli; Federica Pellegrini	France; Clément Mignon; Jérémy Stravius; Charlotte Bonnet; Anna Santamans
2018 Glasgow	France; Jérémy Stravius; Mehdy Metella; Marie Wattel; Charlotte Bonnet	Netherlands; Nyls Korstanje; Stan Pijnenburg; Femke Heemskerk; Ranomi Kromowidjojo	Russia; Kliment Kolesnikov; Vladislav Grinev; Maria Kameneva; Arina Openysheva
2020 Budapest	Great Britain; Duncan Scott; Tom Dean; Anna Hopkin; Freya Anderson	Netherlands; Stan Pijnenburg; Jesse Puts; Ranomi Kromowidjojo; Femke Heemskerk	Italy; Alessandro Miressi; Thomas Ceccon; Federica Pellegrini; Silvia Di Pietro
2022 Rome	France; Maxime Grousset; Charles Rihoux; Charlotte Bonnet; Marie Wattel	Great Britain; Thomas Dean; Matthew Richards; Anna Hopkin; Freya Anderson	Sweden; Björn Seeliger; Robin Hanson; Sarah Sjöström; Louise Hansson
2024 Belgrade	Hungary; Hubert Kós; Szebasztián Szabó; Panna Ugrai; Nikolett Pádár	Poland; Mateusz Chowaniec; Kamil Sieradzki; Zuzanna Famulok; Kornelia Fiedkiewicz	Germany; Martin Wrede; Peter Varjasi; Nicole Maier; Nina Jazy
2026 Paris	Neutral Athletes B Egor Kornev; Ivan Giryov; Daria Klepikova; Kira Manokhina; Roman Zhidkov; Vasilii Kukushkin; Dariia Surushkina; Kseniia Sorokina	Netherlands; Sean Niewold; Merlin Belmon; Milou van Wijk; Marrit Steenbergen; Brandon van den Berg; Yara van Kalmthout; Imani de Jong	Italy; Carlos D'Ambrosio; Thomas Ceccon; Sara Curtis; Emma Virginia Menicucci; Manuel Frigo; Alessandra Mao

=== 4 × 200 metre mixed freestyle ===
Year	Gold	Silver	Bronze
2018 Glasgow	Germany; Jacob Heidtmann; Henning Mühlleitner; Reva Foos; Annika Bruhn	Russia; Mikhail Vekovishchev; Mikhail Dovgalyuk; Valeriya Salamatina; Viktoriya Andreyeva	Great Britain; Stephen Milne; Craig McLean; Kathryn Greenslade; Freya Anderson
2020 Budapest	Great Britain; Tom Dean; James Guy; Abbie Wood; Freya Anderson	Italy; Stefano Ballo; Stefano Di Cola; Federica Pellegrini; Margherita Panziera	Russia; Aleksandr Shchegolev; Aleksandr Krasnykh; Anna Egorova; Anastasiya Kirpichnikova
2022 Rome	Great Britain; Tom Dean; Matt Richards; Freya Colbert; Freya Anderson	France; Hadrien Salvan; Wissam-Amazigh Yebba; Charlotte Bonnet; Lucile Tessariol	Italy; Stefano Di Cola; Matteo Ciampi; Alice Mizzau; Noemi Cesarano
2024 Belgrade	Hungary; Richárd Márton; Balázs Holló; Minna Ábrahám; Nikolett Pádár	Poland; Bartosz Piszczorowicz; Kamil Sieradzki; Wiktoria Gusc; Zuzanna Famulok	Germany; Danny Schmidt; Philipp Peschke; Nicole Maier; Leonie Kullmann
2026 Paris	Great Britain; Jack McMillan; Matt Richards; Freya Colbert; Freya Anderson; Leah Schlosshan; Tyler Melbourne-Smith	Germany; Lukas Märtens; Jarno Baschnitt; Linda Roth; Maya Tobehn; Timo Sorgius; Nicole Maier	Neutral Athletes B Grigorii Vekovishchev; Ivan Giryov; Daria Klepikova; Kseniia Misharina; Roman Akimov; Andrei Cherepkov; Sofia Diakova

=== 4 × 100 metre mixed medley ===
Year	Gold	Silver	Bronze
2014 Berlin	Great Britain; Chris Walker-Hebborn; Adam Peaty; Jemma Lowe; Fran Halsall	Netherlands; Bastiaan Lijesen; Bram Dekker; Inge Dekker; Femke Heemskerk	Russia; Vladimir Morozov; Vitalina Simonova; Viacheslav Prudnikov; Veronika Andrusenko
2016 London	Great Britain; Chris Walker-Hebborn; Adam Peaty; Siobhan-Marie O'Connor; Fran Halsall	Italy; Simone Sabbioni; Martina Carraro; Piero Codia; Federica Pellegrini	Hungary; Gábor Balog; Gábor Financsek; Evelyn Verrasztó; Zsuzsanna Jakabos
2018 Glasgow	Great Britain; Georgia Davies; Adam Peaty; James Guy; Freya Anderson	Russia; Kliment Kolesnikov; Yuliya Yefimova; Svetlana Chimrova; Vladimir Morozov	Italy; Margherita Panziera; Fabio Scozzoli; Elena Di Liddo; Alessandro Miressi
2020 Budapest	Great Britain; Kathleen Dawson; Adam Peaty; James Guy; Anna Hopkin	Netherlands; Kira Toussaint; Arno Kamminga; Nyls Korstanje; Femke Heemskerk	Italy; Margherita Panziera; Nicolò Martinenghi; Elena Di Liddo; Alessandro Miressi
2022 Rome	Netherlands; Kira Toussaint; Arno Kamminga; Nyls Korstanje; Marrit Steenbergen	Italy; Thomas Ceccon; Nicolò Martinenghi; Elena Di Liddo; Silvia Di Pietro	Great Britain; Medi Harris; James Wilby; Jacob Peters; Anna Hopkin
2024 Belgrade	Israel; Anastasia Gorbenko; Ron Polonsky; Gal Cohen Groumi; Andrea Murez	Germany; Maya Werner; Melvin Imoudu; Luca Armbruster; Nina Jazy	Hungary; Hubert Kós; Eszter Békési; Richárd Márton; Petra Senánszky
2026 Paris	France; Mary-Ambre Moluh; Carl Aitkaci; Maxime Grousset; Marie Wattel; Amaury Albar; Albane Cachot	Netherlands; Maaike de Waard; Caspar Corbeau; Sean Niewold; Marrit Steenbergen; Koen de Groet; Tessa Giele	Neutral Athletes B Kliment Kolesnikov; Kirill Prigoda; Daria Klepikova; Alexandra Kuznetsova; Pavel Samusenko; Ivan Kozhakin; Arina Surkova; Alina Gaifutdinova

== See also ==
- List of European Aquatics Championships medalists in swimming (women)
- List of European Aquatics Championships medalists in open water swimming
- List of European Aquatics Championships medalists in artistic swimming
