= Bitskey =

Bitskey is a surname. Notable people with the surname include:

- Aladár Bitskey (1905–1991), Hungarian swimmer
- Tibor Bitskey (1929–2015), Hungarian television and film actor
- Zoltán Bitskey (1904–1988), Hungarian swimmer
