= Sergey Sokolovskiy =

Sergey Sokolovsky
Personal information
- Full name: Sergey Vladimirovich Sokolovsky
- Nationality: Soviet Union
- Born: January 19, 1969 (age 57) Krasnoyarsk-45, Krasnoyarsk Krai, Soviet Union
- Height: 176 cm (5 ft 9 in)
- Weight: 68 kg (150 lb)

Sport
- Sport: Swimming
- Strokes: Breaststroke
- Club: "Olimp" (Zelenogorsk), DYUSSH (Krasnoyarsk)
- Coach: Vladimir Avdeev, L.M. Shishkarev
Medal record
European Championships
Silver medal – second place	Strasbourg 1987	200 m breaststroke
Soviet Union Championships
Gold medal – first place	1987	200 m breaststroke
Silver medal – second place	1987	50 m breaststroke
Silver medal – second place	1987	100 m breaststroke
Soviet Union Short Course Championships
Gold medal – first place	1987	200 m breaststroke
Gold medal – first place	1988	200 m breaststroke
Silver medal – second place	1987	100 m breaststroke
Silver medal – second place	1988	4×100 m medley relay
Silver medal – second place	1989	200 m breaststroke

Sergey Vladimirovich Sokolovsky (Russian: Сергей Владимирович Соколовский; born 19 January 1969 in Krasnoyarsk-45, Krasnoyarsk Krai, Soviet Union) is a former Soviet swimmer specializing in the breaststroke. He is a silver medalist of the 1987 European Aquatics Championships, a multiple-time champion and medalist of the USSR championships, and a USSR record holder. Member of the USSR national team from 1985 to 1990. Master of Sport of the USSR, International Class (1987).

== Biography ==
Sokolovsky began swimming in 1977 at the youth sports school in Krasnoyarsk under the guidance of coach Vladimir Avdeev. In 1989, he graduated from the Siberian Academy of Physical Culture (formerly known as the Omsk Institute of Physical Culture).

== Career ==
Result	Competition	Event
Silver	1987 European Aquatics Championships	200 m breaststroke
Gold	USSR Championships 1987	200 m breaststroke
Gold	USSR Short Course Championships 1987	200 m breaststroke
Gold	USSR Short Course Championships 1988	200 m breaststroke

Three-time USSR champion and multiple-time medalist.

Champion and medalist of the Spartakiad of the Peoples of the USSR.

USSR record holder.

Winner of the USSR vs. GDR dual meet (1986, 200 m breaststroke – 2:18.75).
