= Friedel Berges =

German swimmer (1903–1969)

Personal information
- Born: October 23, 1903 Darmstadt, German Empire
- Died: August 13, 1969 (aged 65) Darmstadt, Germany

Sport
- Sport: Swimming
Medal record
Representing Germany
European Championships
Gold medal – first place	1926 Budapest	4x200m freestyle relay
Gold medal – first place	1927 Bologna	4x200m freestyle relay
Silver medal – second place	1926 Budapest	1500m freestyle
Bronze medal – third place	1926 Budapest	400m freestyle

Friedel Berges (23 October 1903 – 13 August 1969) was a German swimmer who competed in the 1928 Summer Olympics.
