= Klaus Bodinger =

German swimmer (1932–1994)

Personal information
- Born: 14 May 1932 Breslau, Germany
- Died: 6 April 1994 (aged 61) Strasbourg, Germany

Sport
- Sport: Swimming
- Club: Stahl Nord Leipzig (1952), Motor Gohlis Nord (1953)
Medal record
Swimming
European Championships
Representing East Germany
Gold medal – first place	1954 Turin	200 m breaststroke
Representing West Germany
Bronze medal – third place	1958 Budapest	200 m breaststroke

Klaus Bodinger (14 May 1932 – 6 April 1994) was a German swimmer who specialized in the 200 m breaststroke. In this discipline he won two national titles in 1952–1953 and a gold medal at the 1954 European Aquatics Championships competing for East Germany. He then moved to West Germany, where he won three national titles in 1955, 1957 and 1958. He also won a bronze medal at the 1958 European Aquatics Championships competing for West Germany.
