= Joris Tjebbes =

Dutch swimmer

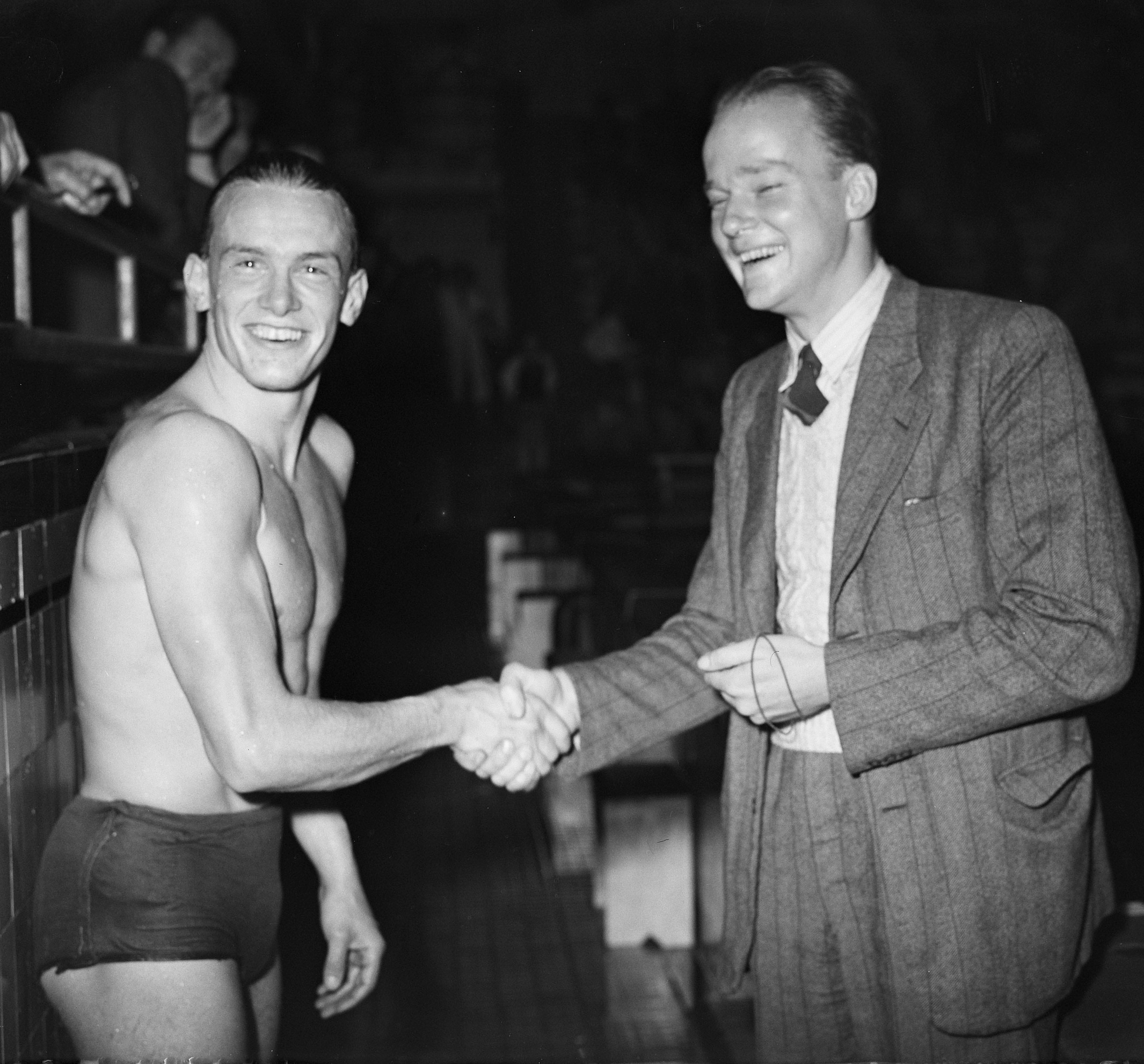
- Kees Hoving congratulates Joris Tjebbes (left) with breaking his national record in the 100 m freestyle in 1950

Personal information
- Born: 5 November 1929 Vlissingen, the Netherlands
- Died: 31 July 2001 (aged 71) Hoogeveen, the Netherlands

Sport
- Sport: Swimming
- Club: HPC, Heemstede
Medal record
Representing the Netherlands
European Championships
Bronze medal – third place	1950 Vienna	100 m freestyle

Joris Willem Eelco Tjebbes (5 November 1929, in Vlissingen – 31 July 2001, in Hoogeveen) was a Dutch freestyle swimmer. He won a bronze medal at the 1950 European Aquatics Championships and competed at the 1952 Summer Olympics. Between 1950 and 1952, Tjebbes was the national champion in the 100 m and 400 m and set nine national records in the 100 m, 200 m and 400 m freestyle events.
