= Gennady Androsov =

Ukrainian swimmer (1939–2016)

Personal information
- Born: 1 August 1939 Krasnoye, Novosibirsk Oblast, Russian SFSR, Soviet Union
- Died: 21 April 2016 (aged 76) Lviv, Ukraine
- Height: 1.69 m (5 ft 7 in)
- Weight: 61 kg (134 lb)

Sport
- Sport: Swimming
- Club: Dynamo Lviv (1956–1963)
Medal record
Representing Soviet Union
European Championships
Gold medal – first place	1962 Leipzig	400 m medley
Bronze medal – third place	1958 Budapest	1500 m freestyle

Gennady Ivanovich Androsov (Russian: Геннадий Иванович Андросов; 1 August 1939 – 21 March 2016) was a Ukrainian swimmer. He won a gold medal in the individual 400 m medley at the 1962 European Aquatics Championships, and set a world record in the same event in 1957. In the 1500 m freestyle discipline, he won a bronze medal at the 1958 European Aquatics Championships and competed at the 1956 and 1960 Summer Olympics. He was a national champion in the 400 m (1961), 1500 m (1956, 1960) and 4×200 m freestyle (1961) and 400 m medley (1962, 1963) events.
