= Kees Hoving =

Dutch swimmer (1919–1991)

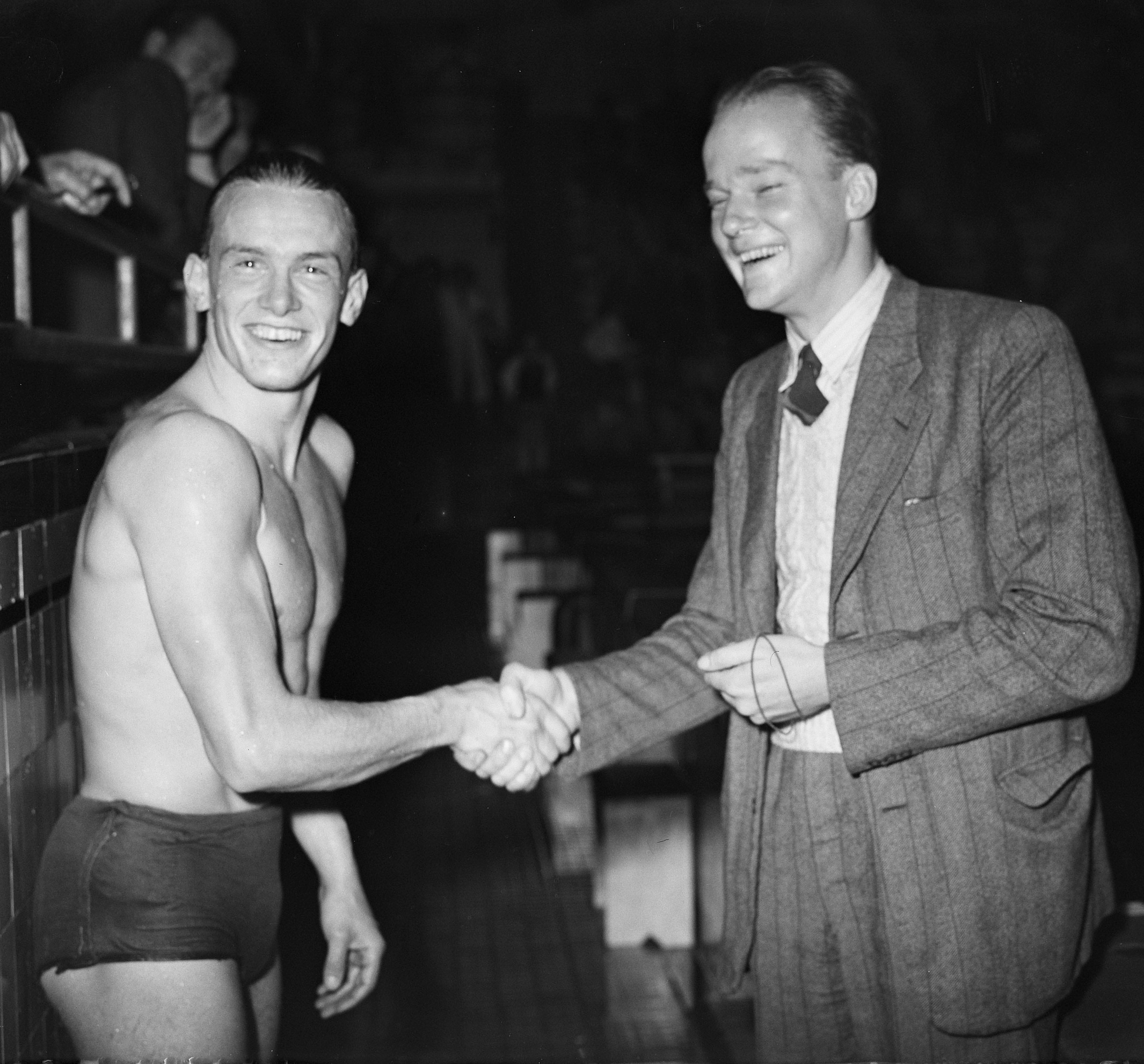
- Kees Hoving (right) congratulates Joris Tjebbes with breaking his national record in October 1950

Personal information
- Born: 1919 Medan, Indonesia
- Died: 1991 (aged 71–72) Utrecht, Netherlands

Sport
- Sport: Swimming
Medal record
Representing the Netherlands
European Championships
Gold medal – first place	1938 London	100m freestyle

Kees Hoving (1919 – 1991) was a Dutch swimmer who specialized in the 100m freestyle event. He won the 1938 European Aquatics Championships with a time of 59.8 seconds, becoming the first Dutch male athlete to win a European swimming title and to swim 100 meters within one minute. After that he did not compete internationally, except for the 1947 European Aquatics Championships, due to World War II and later due to a conflict with his swimming club. However, he won the national championships in 1937, 1938, 1941, 1946 and 1948, and set eight national records between 1937 and 1946. His records were broken only in 1950, by Joris Tjebbes.
