= Valentin Kuzmin =

Russian swimmer (1941–2008)

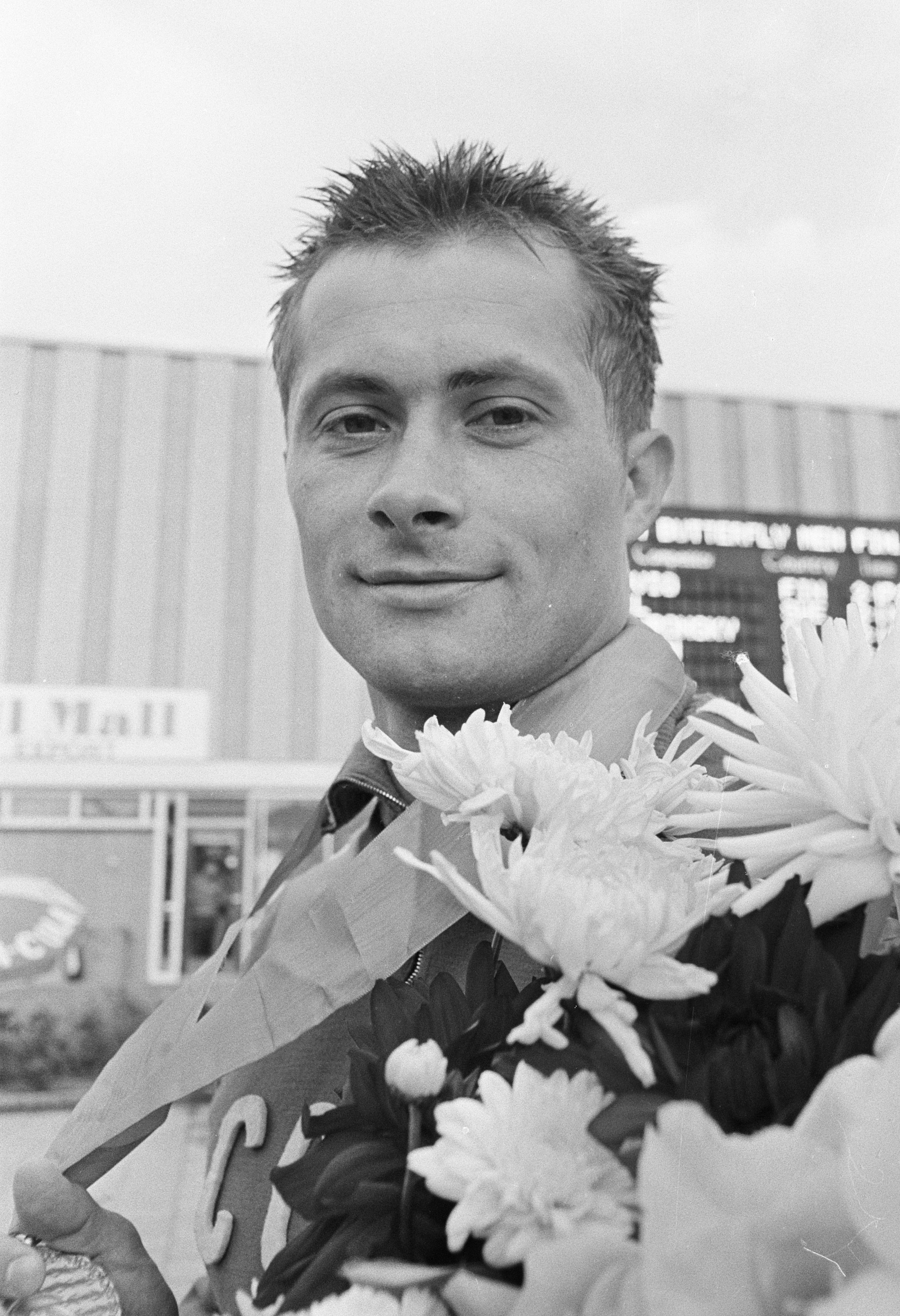
- Kuzmin in 1966

Personal information
- Born: 4 January 1941 Moscow, Russia
- Died: 2008 (aged 67) Moscow, Russia
- Height: 1.79 m (5 ft 10 in)
- Weight: 77 kg (170 lb)

Sport
- Sport: Swimming
- Club: Burevestnik Moscow
Medal record
Representing Soviet Union
European Championships
Gold medal – first place	1962 Leipzig	100 m butterfly
Silver medal – second place	1962 Leipzig	4×100 m medley
Gold medal – first place	1966 Utrecht	100 m butterfly
Gold medal – first place	1966 Utrecht	4×100 m medley

Valentin Kuzmin (Russian: Валентин Кузьмин; 4 January 1941 – 2008) was a Russian butterfly swimmer who won one silver and three gold medals at the European championships in 1962 and 1966. He competed in four events at the 1960, 1964 and 1968 Summer Olympics and finished in seventh, fifth and fourth place in the 200 m butterfly event, respectively. His team was also fourth in the 4 × 100 m medley relay in 1964.

Between 1962 and 1966 he set seven European records, four in the 200 m butterfly and three in the 4 × 100 m medley relay. During 1959–1966 he also set 24 national records and won 20 national titles in butterfly and medley events.

After retirement from senior swimming he competed in the masters category and won two national titles in 1989. He had a PhD in economical sciences and was a professor at the Moscow State University. Between 1989 and 2005 he worked in Chile with the United Nations. After returning to Russia he took part in European championships in Sweden.
