= Jürgen Dietze =

German swimmer (1942–2026)

Personal information
- Born: 16 September 1942 Leipzig, Germany
- Died: 30 August 2026 (aged 83) Leipzig, Germany

Sport
- Sport: Swimming
Medal record
Representing East Germany
European Championships
Gold medal – first place	1962 Leipzig	4x100m medley relay
Silver medal – second place	1966 Utrecht	4x100m medley relay

Jürgen Dietze (16 September 1942 – 30 August 2026) was a German swimmer who competed in the 1960 Summer Olympics and in the 1964 Summer Olympics.
