= Vladimir Avdeev =

Russian swimming coach (born 1954)

- Владимир Михайлович Авдеев
- Born: July 16, 1954 (age 72); Kansk, Krasnoyarsk Krai, Russian SFSR, Soviet Union
- Occupation: Swimming coach
- Awards: Honored Coach of Russia; Excellence in Physical Culture and Sports Badge

Vladimir Mikhailovich Avdeev (Russian: Владимир Михайлович Авдеев; born 16 July 1954) is a Russian swimming coach, Honored Coach of Russia (1991), and a coach of the highest qualification category. Since 1990, he has been a coach of the Russian national swimming team.

== Biography ==
Vladimir Avdeev was born in Kansk, Krasnoyarsk Krai, Russian SFSR, Soviet Union. In 1978, he graduated from the Siberian Academy of Physical Culture in Omsk. In 1972, he achieved the rank of Candidate for Master of Sports in freestyle swimming.

== Career ==
Vladimir began his coaching career in 1978 at the Youth Sports School in Krasnoyarsk-45 (now known as Zelenogorsk). From 1978 to 1984, he worked at the Olympic Reserve Sports School "Olimp" in Zelenogorsk. Between 1984 and 1995, he coached at Youth Sports School No. 6 in Omsk, and since 1995, he has been working again at "Olimp".

Throughout his career, Vladimir Avdeev has trained:

- 1 Honoured Master of Sport of Russia,
- 1 Master of Sport of Russia, International Class,
- 7 Masters of Sport,
- and 15 Candidates for Master of Sports.

In 1991, he was awarded the title of Honored Coach of Russia. Other awards include:

- "Excellence in Physical Culture and Sports Badge" (1997),
- Badge "For Merit to the City" (2016),
- Letter of Gratitude from the Governor of Krasnoyarsk Krai (2011),
- Honorary Certificate from the Minister of Sports of Krasnoyarsk Krai (2012).

== Notable students ==
- Arina Openysheva — Honoured Master of Sport of Russia, bronze medalist at the 2016 FINA World Swimming Championships (25 m), participant in the 2016 Summer Olympics, champion and multiple medalist of the Summer Universiade, and European Games champion.
- Sergey Sokolovsky — Master of Sport of Russia, International Class, silver medalist at the 1987 European Aquatics Championships and winner of the USSR championships.
- Valentin Pakhomov — Master of Sport, bronze medalist at the World Youth Games in Moscow, and silver medalist at the Russian junior championships.
- Dmitry Shinkarev — Master of Sport, member of the Krasnoyarsk Krai team, medalist of the Siberian Federal District championships, and participant in national competitions.
