= Aladár Bitskey =

Hungarian swimmer (1905–1991)

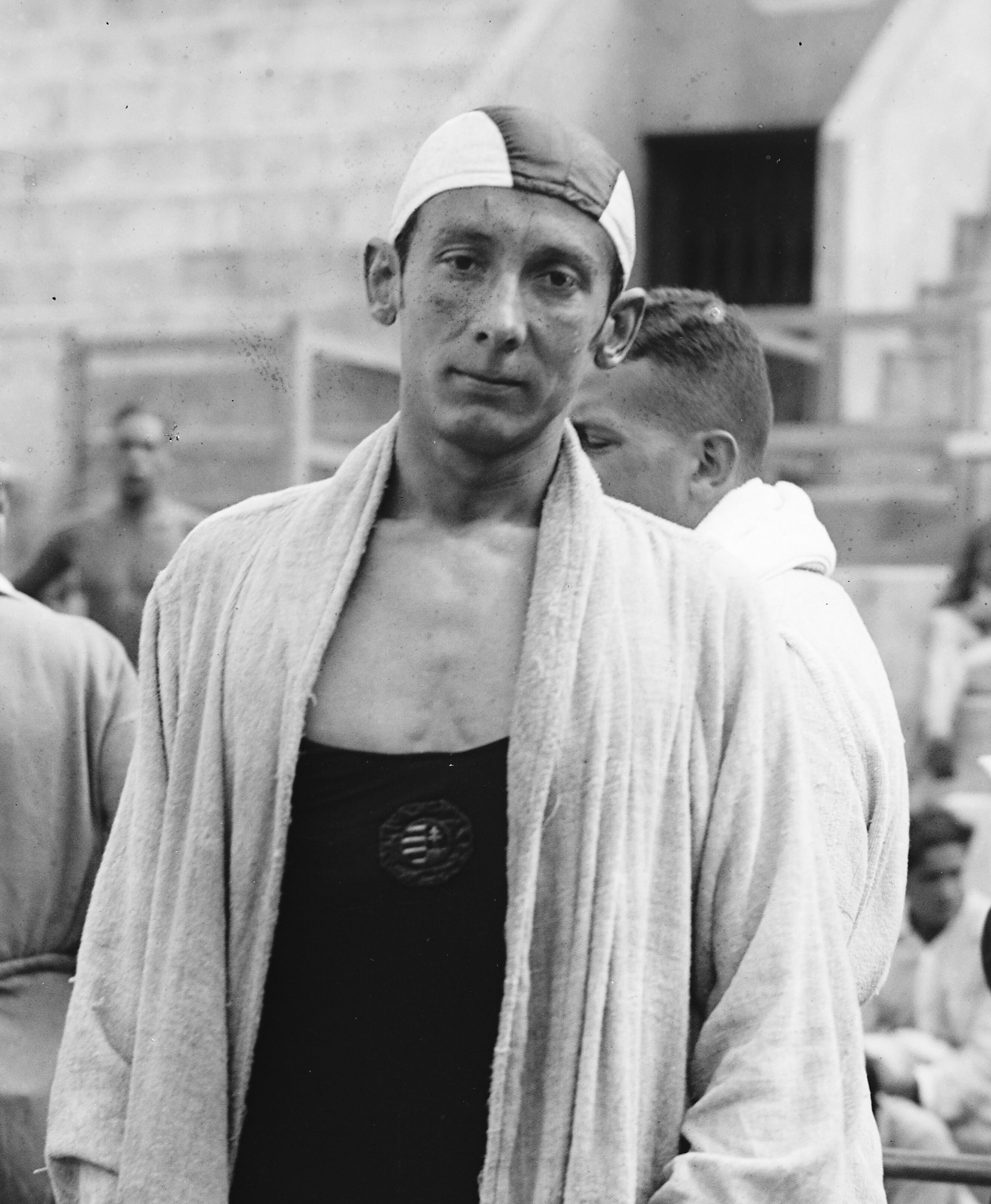
- Aladár Bitskey in 1928

Personal information
- Born: 18 October 1905 Eger, Hungary
- Died: 18 March 1991 (aged 85) Eger, Hungary

Sport
- Sport: Swimming
- Club: Magyar Véderő Egylet Egri Sportegyesület
Medal record
Representing Hungary
European Championships
Silver medal – second place	1927 Bologna	100 m backstroke
Silver medal – second place	1931 Paris	100 m backstroke

Aladár Bitskey (18 October 1905 – 18 March 1991) was a Hungarian swimmer who won silver medals at the European championships of 1927 and 1931 in the 100 m backstroke. He competed in the same event at the 1928 Summer Olympics, but did not reach the final.

His elder brother, Zoltán Bitskey, was also a Hungarian Olympic swimmer.
