= Zoltán Bitskey =

Hungarian swimmer (1904–1988)

Personal information
- Born: 10 February 1904 Zvolen, Austria-Hungary
- Died: 1 August 1988 (aged 84) Miskolc, Hungary

Sport
- Sport: Swimming
Medal record
Men's swimming
Representing Hungary
European Championships
Silver medal – second place	1926 Budapest	4×200 m freestyle

Zoltán Bitskey (10 February 1904 – 1 August 1988) was a Hungarian swimmer who won a silver medal in the 4×200 m freestyle relay at the 1926 European Aquatics Championships. He competed in the 200 m breaststroke event at the 1924 Summer Olympics, but did not reach the finals.

His younger brother, Aladár Bitskey, was also a Hungarian Olympic swimmer.
