= Leonid Kolesnikov =

Soviet swimmer (1937–2010)

Personal information
- Born: April 27, 1937 Tashkent, Uzbekistan
- Died: November 17, 2010 (aged 73) Moscow, Russia
- Height: 1.80 m (5 ft 11 in)
- Weight: 73 kg (161 lb)

Sport
- Sport: Swimming
- Club: CSKA Moscow
Medal record
Representing the Soviet Union
European Championships
Gold medal – first place	1958 Budapest	200 m breaststroke
Silver medal – second place	1962 Leipzig	4×100 m medley

Leonid Nikolayevich Kolesnikov (Russian: Леонид Николаевич Колесников; 27 April 1937 – 17 November 2010) was a Soviet swimmer. He had his best achievements in breaststroke, winning a European title in the 200 m in 1958 and setting a world record in the 100 m breaststroke in 1961. He competed at the 1960 Summer Olympics in the 400 m freestyle and 4×100 m medley relay and finished in fifth place in the relay, swimming the breaststroke leg.

Between 1958 and 1961 Kolesnikov set six European records: three in the 200 m breaststroke and three in the 4×100 m medley relay. In 1962 he won a silver medal in the medley relay at the European championships.
