= European Aquatics Championships =

European championships in swimming

- Status: Active
- Genre: Sporting event
- Date: Mid-year
- Frequency: Biennial
- Country: Varying
- Inaugurated: 1926
- Most recent: Paris 2026
- Previous event: Belgrade 2024
- Next event: 2028

The European Aquatics Championships (commonly referred to as Europeans) is the continental Aquatics championship for Europe, which is organised by European Aquatics (LEN) – the governing body for aquatic sport in Europe. The Championships are currently held every two years (in even years) and since 2022, they have included 5 aquatics disciplines: swimming (long course/50m pool), diving, synchronised swimming, open water swimming and high diving. Prior to 1999, the championships also included water polo, which beginning in 1999 LEN split-off into a separate championships. The open water events are not held during the Olympic year.

The Championships are generally held over a two-week time-period in mid-to-late Summer, but in the most recent Summer Olympics years (2004, 2008, 2012, 2016 and 2020), the Championships were moved to the Spring to be moved away from the Summer Olympic Games.

The swimming portion of these championships is considered one of the pre-eminent swimming competitions in the world. LEN also conducts an annual short-course (25 meters) swimming championship, which is a completely separate, distinct event (typically held in early December).

== Championships ==
Historically, the Championships were first held in 1926, and included water polo prior to 1999 when the discipline was moved to the European Water Polo Championship. From 1973-1999 Europeans were held in years without a Summer Olympics or World Championships, save 1979 (1973 being the inception year of the World Championships; and 1999 being the last year before Worlds moved from even-years between Summer Olympics to every-odd year beginning in 2001). Women were first allowed to participate at the second Championships in 1927.

| Number | Year | Host city | Country | Events | Dates | First in the medal table | Second in the medal table | Third in the medal table |
|---|---|---|---|---|---|---|---|---|
| 1 | 1926 | Budapest | Hungary | 9 | 18–22 August 1926 | Germany | Sweden | Hungary |
| 2 | 1927 | Bologna | Italy | 16 | 31 August – 4 September 1927 | Germany | Sweden | Netherlands |
| 3 | 1931 | Paris | France | 16 | 23–30 August 1931 | Hungary | Germany | Netherlands |
| 4 | 1934 | Magdeburg | Germany | 16 | 12–19 August 1934 | Germany | Netherlands | Hungary |
| 5 | 1938 | London | Great Britain | 16 | 6–13 August 1938 | (Nazi Germany) Germany | Denmark | Netherlands |
| 6 | 1947 | Monte Carlo | Monaco | 16 | 10–14 September 1947 | France | Denmark | Hungary |
| 7 | 1950 | Vienna | Austria | 16 | 20–27 August 1950 | France | Netherlands | West Germany |
| 8 | 1954 | Turin | Italy | 18 | 31 August – 5 September 1954 | Hungary | USSR | East Germany |
| 9 | 1958 | Budapest | Hungary | 20 | 31 August – 6 September 1958 | USSR | Great Britain | Netherlands |
| 10 | 1962 | Leipzig | East Germany | 23 | 18–25 August 1962 | Netherlands | East Germany | USSR |
| 11 | 1966 | Utrecht | Netherlands | 23 | 20–27 August 1966 | USSR | East Germany | Netherlands |
| 12 | 1970 | Barcelona | Spain | 34 | 5–13 September 1970 | East Germany | USSR | West Germany |
| 13 | 1974 | Vienna | Austria | 37 | 18–25 August 1974 | East Germany | West Germany | Great Britain |
| 14 | 1977 | Jönköping | Sweden | 37 | 14–21 August 1977 | East Germany | USSR | West Germany |
| 15 | 1981 | Split | Yugoslavia | 37 | 4–12 September 1981 | East Germany | Soviet Union | Great Britain |
| 16 | 1983 | Rome | Italy | 38 | 22–27 August 1983 | East Germany | Soviet Union | West Germany |
| 17 | 1985 | Sofia; Oslo | Bulgaria; Norway | 39 | 4–11 August 1985; 12–18 August 1985 | East Germany | Soviet Union | West Germany |
| 18 | 1987 | Strasbourg | France | 41 | 16–23 August 1987 | East Germany | Soviet Union | West Germany |
| 19 | 1989 | Bonn | West Germany | 43 | 15–20 August 1989 | East Germany | Soviet Union | France |
| 20 | 1991 | Athens; Terracina | Greece; Italy | 47 | 18–25 August 1991; 14–15 September 1991 | Soviet Union | Germany | Hungary |
| 21 | 1993 | Sheffield; Slapy | Great Britain; Czech Republic | 47 | 3–8 August 1993; 28–29 August 1993 | Germany | Russia | Hungary |
| 22 | 1995 | Vienna | Austria | 47 | 22–27 August 1995 | Russia | Germany | Hungary |
| 23 | 1997 | Seville | Spain | 51 | 19–24 August 1997 | Russia | Germany | Hungary |
| 24 | 1999 | Istanbul | Turkey | 55 | 26 July – 1 August 1999 | Germany | Russia | Netherlands |
| 25 | 2000 | Helsinki | Finland | 55 | 3–9 July 2000 | Russia | Germany | Italy |
| 26 | 2002 | Berlin | Germany | 57 | 29 July – 4 August 2002 | Germany | Russia | Italy |
| 27 | 2004 | Madrid | Spain | 58 | 5–16 May 2004 | Ukraine | Russia | Italy |
| 28 | 2006 | Budapest | Hungary | 58 | 26 July – 6 August 2006 | Russia | Germany | France |
| 29 | 2008 | Eindhoven | Netherlands | 54 | 13–24 March 2008 | Russia | Italy | France |
| 30 | 2010 | Budapest | Hungary | 61 | 4–15 August 2010 | Russia | Germany | France |
| 31 | 2012 | Debrecen; Eindhoven | Hungary; Netherlands | 55 | 15–27 May 2012 | Hungary | Germany | Italy |
| 32 | 2014 | Berlin | Germany | 64 | 13–24 August 2014 | Great Britain | Russia | Italy |
| 33 | 2016 | London | Great Britain | 64 | 9–22 May 2016 | Great Britain | Hungary | Russia |
| 34 | 2018 (Note: Part of the European Championships.) | Glasgow; Edinburgh | Great Britain | 72 | 2–12 August 2018 | Russia | Great Britain | Italy |
| 35 | 2020 | Budapest | Hungary | 73 | 10–23 May 2021 | Russia | Great Britain | Italy |
| 36 | 2022 | Rome | Italy | 77 | 11–21 August 2022 | Italy | Great Britain | Ukraine |
| 37 | 2024 | Belgrade | Serbia | 74 | 10–23 June 2024 | Hungary | Spain | Greece |
| 38 | 2026 | Paris | France | 76 | 31 July–16 August 2026 | Great Britain | Italy | Neutral Athletes B (Note: In accordance with sanctions imposed following the 2022 Russian invasion of Ukraine, athletes from Russia were not permitted to use the name, flag, or anthem of the Russian Federation. They instead participated as "Neutral Athletes B (NAB)" and under the European Aquatics flag.) |

== Medal tables (1926–2026) ==
Updated after the 2026 European Aquatics Championships.

=== Overall ===
| Rank | Nation | Gold | Silver | Bronze | Total |
|---|---|---|---|---|---|
| 1 | Russia | 197 | 116 | 87 | 400 |
| 2 | Germany | 184 | 177 | 147 | 508 |
| 3 | Italy | 143 | 175 | 220 | 538 |
| 4 | East Germany | 143 | 115 | 68 | 326 |
| 5 | Hungary | 139 | 125 | 94 | 358 |
| 6 | Great Britain | 128 | 124 | 149 | 401 |
| 7 | France | 98 | 107 | 102 | 307 |
| 8 | Soviet Union | 97 | 87 | 79 | 263 |
| 9 | Netherlands | 92 | 105 | 93 | 290 |
| 10 | Ukraine | 72 | 74 | 73 | 219 |
| 11 | Sweden | 71 | 79 | 76 | 226 |
| 12 | West Germany | 41 | 33 | 49 | 123 |
| 13 | Spain | 39 | 68 | 55 | 162 |
| 14 | Denmark | 30 | 25 | 34 | 89 |
| 15 | Poland | 23 | 26 | 30 | 79 |
| 16 | Romania | 17 | 26 | 32 | 75 |
| 17 | Austria | 17 | 20 | 24 | 61 |
| 18 | Greece | 16 | 22 | 29 | 67 |
| 19 | Finland | 13 | 9 | 12 | 34 |
| 20 | Neutral Athletes B | 10 | 9 | 13 | 32 |
| 21 | Czech Republic | 9 | 2 | 17 | 28 |
| 22 | Belgium | 7 | 8 | 18 | 33 |
| 23 | Ireland | 7 | 8 | 4 | 19 |
| 24 | Israel | 7 | 6 | 12 | 25 |
| 25 | Norway | 6 | 9 | 5 | 20 |
| 26 | Switzerland | 5 | 14 | 22 | 41 |
| 27 | Belarus | 5 | 10 | 17 | 32 |
| 28 | Lithuania | 5 | 7 | 11 | 23 |
| 29 | Serbia | 5 | 2 | 2 | 9 |
| 30 | Slovakia | 3 | 11 | 4 | 18 |
| 31 | Bulgaria | 3 | 4 | 9 | 16 |
| 32 | Yugoslavia | 2 | 14 | 13 | 29 |
| 33 | Croatia | 2 | 7 | 8 | 17 |
| 34 | Czechoslovakia | 2 | 5 | 11 | 18 |
| 35 | Slovenia | 2 | 5 | 10 | 17 |
| 36 | Turkey | 2 | 1 | 5 | 8 |
| 37 | Portugal | 1 | 2 | 5 | 8 |
| 38 | Bosnia and Herzegovina | 1 | 1 | 1 | 3 |
| 38 | Neutral Athletes A (Note: In accordance with sanctions imposed following the 2022 Russian invasion of Ukraine, athletes from Belarus were not permitted to use the name, flag, or anthem of the Republic of Belarus. They instead participated as "Neutral Athletes A (NAA)" and under the European Aquatics flag.) | 1 | 1 | 1 | 3 |
| 40 | Estonia | 1 | 1 | 0 | 2 |
| 41 | Faroe Islands | 0 | 3 | 0 | 3 |
| 42 | Iceland | 0 | 2 | 1 | 3 |
| 43 | FR Yugoslavia | 0 | 1 | 0 | 1 |
| 44 | Armenia | 0 | 0 | 1 | 1 |
| Totals (44 entries) | | 1,646 | 1,646 | 1,643 | 4,935 |

Note: The table includes medals won in swimming (since 1926), diving (since 1926), synchronized swimming (since 1974), open water swimming (since 1991), high diving (since 2022) and water polo since 1926 until and including 1997 when the discipline was part of the event. From 1999 the water polo event was separated and got its own independent tournament as European Water Polo Championship.

As of 2026, Albania, Andorra, Azerbaijan, Cyprus, Georgia, Gibraltar, Kosovo, Latvia, Liechtenstein, Luxembourg, Malta, Moldova, Monaco, Montenegro, North Macedonia and San Marino have yet to win a medal.

=== Swimming (1926–2026) ===
| Rank | Nation | Gold | Silver | Bronze | Total |
|---|---|---|---|---|---|
| 1 | East Germany | 132 | 100 | 55 | 287 |
| 2 | Hungary | 118 | 101 | 77 | 296 |
| 3 | Germany | 96 | 95 | 79 | 270 |
| 4 | Italy | 82 | 98 | 114 | 294 |
| 5 | Great Britain | 81 | 94 | 117 | 292 |
| 6 | Russia | 79 | 57 | 46 | 182 |
| 7 | France | 74 | 68 | 66 | 208 |
| 8 | Netherlands | 67 | 89 | 75 | 231 |
| 9 | Sweden | 63 | 59 | 67 | 189 |
| 10 | Soviet Union | 61 | 55 | 52 | 168 |
| 11 | Ukraine | 36 | 31 | 25 | 92 |
| 12 | West Germany | 35 | 27 | 42 | 104 |
| 13 | Denmark | 28 | 25 | 30 | 83 |
| 14 | Spain | 23 | 27 | 29 | 79 |
| 15 | Poland | 22 | 25 | 28 | 75 |
| 16 | Romania | 15 | 25 | 32 | 72 |
| 17 | Greece | 12 | 15 | 21 | 48 |
| 18 | Finland | 11 | 7 | 8 | 26 |
| 19 | Austria | 9 | 10 | 12 | 31 |
| 20 | Czech Republic | 8 | 2 | 11 | 21 |
| 21 | Belgium | 7 | 8 | 15 | 30 |
| 22 | Ireland | 7 | 8 | 3 | 18 |
| 23 | Israel | 7 | 6 | 9 | 22 |
| 24 | Norway | 6 | 8 | 5 | 19 |
| 25 | Lithuania | 5 | 7 | 11 | 23 |
| 26 | Belarus | 5 | 7 | 10 | 22 |
| 27 | Neutral Athletes B | 5 | 5 | 9 | 19 |
| 28 | Serbia | 5 | 2 | 1 | 8 |
| 29 | Switzerland | 4 | 8 | 12 | 24 |
| 30 | Slovakia | 3 | 11 | 2 | 16 |
| 31 | Croatia | 2 | 7 | 8 | 17 |
| 32 | Slovenia | 2 | 5 | 10 | 17 |
| 33 | Bulgaria | 2 | 3 | 7 | 12 |
| 34 | Turkey | 2 | 1 | 5 | 8 |
| 35 | Yugoslavia | 1 | 7 | 9 | 17 |
| 36 | Czechoslovakia | 1 | 3 | 9 | 13 |
| 37 | Portugal | 1 | 2 | 4 | 7 |
| 38 | Bosnia and Herzegovina | 1 | 1 | 1 | 3 |
| 39 | Estonia | 1 | 1 | 0 | 2 |
| 40 | Faroe Islands | 0 | 3 | 0 | 3 |
| 41 | Iceland | 0 | 2 | 1 | 3 |
| 42 | Neutral Athletes A | 0 | 0 | 1 | 1 |
| Totals (42 entries) | | 1,119 | 1,115 | 1,118 | 3,352 |

=== Diving (1926–2026) ===
| Rank | Nation | Gold | Silver | Bronze | Total |
|---|---|---|---|---|---|
| 1 | Germany | 62 | 60 | 49 | 171 |
| 2 | Russia | 53 | 43 | 33 | 129 |
| 3 | Italy | 29 | 26 | 29 | 84 |
| 4 | Great Britain | 29 | 24 | 25 | 78 |
| 5 | Soviet Union | 27 | 26 | 24 | 77 |
| 6 | Ukraine | 19 | 23 | 37 | 79 |
| 7 | East Germany | 11 | 14 | 13 | 38 |
| 8 | France | 9 | 7 | 11 | 27 |
| 9 | Sweden | 8 | 17 | 9 | 34 |
| 10 | Austria | 5 | 6 | 5 | 16 |
| 11 | Spain | 4 | 7 | 5 | 16 |
| 12 | West Germany | 4 | 3 | 2 | 9 |
| 13 | Netherlands | 4 | 1 | 3 | 8 |
| 14 | Finland | 2 | 2 | 4 | 8 |
| 15 | Denmark | 2 | 0 | 4 | 6 |
| 16 | Hungary | 1 | 5 | 7 | 13 |
| 17 | Czechoslovakia | 1 | 1 | 2 | 4 |
| 17 | Poland | 1 | 1 | 2 | 4 |
| 19 | Bulgaria | 1 | 1 | 0 | 2 |
| 20 | Switzerland | 0 | 3 | 0 | 3 |
| 21 | Belarus | 0 | 2 | 5 | 7 |
| 22 | Norway | 0 | 1 | 0 | 1 |
| 23 | Armenia | 0 | 0 | 1 | 1 |
| 23 | Ireland | 0 | 0 | 1 | 1 |
| Totals (24 entries) | | 272 | 273 | 271 | 816 |

=== Artistic swimming (1974–2026) ===
| Rank | Nation | Gold | Silver | Bronze | Total |
|---|---|---|---|---|---|
| 1 | Russia | 53 | 3 | 0 | 56 |
| 2 | Great Britain | 17 | 5 | 7 | 29 |
| 3 | Ukraine | 15 | 19 | 11 | 45 |
| 4 | Spain | 12 | 29 | 14 | 55 |
| 5 | France | 9 | 19 | 9 | 37 |
| 6 | Italy | 4 | 25 | 41 | 70 |
| 7 | Soviet Union | 4 | 3 | 1 | 8 |
| 8 | Netherlands | 3 | 6 | 8 | 17 |
| 9 | Greece | 3 | 5 | 6 | 14 |
| 10 | Austria | 3 | 4 | 6 | 13 |
| 11 | Neutral Athletes B | 3 | 1 | 3 | 7 |
| 12 | Germany | 1 | 3 | 1 | 5 |
| 13 | Neutral Athletes A | 1 | 1 | 0 | 2 |
| 14 | West Germany | 0 | 3 | 3 | 6 |
| 15 | Switzerland | 0 | 1 | 9 | 10 |
| 16 | Belarus | 0 | 1 | 2 | 3 |
| 17 | Israel | 0 | 0 | 3 | 3 |
| 18 | Slovakia | 0 | 0 | 2 | 2 |
| 19 | Hungary | 0 | 0 | 1 | 1 |
| 19 | Serbia | 0 | 0 | 1 | 1 |
| Totals (20 entries) | | 128 | 128 | 128 | 384 |

=== Open water swimming (1991–2026) ===
| Rank | Nation | Gold | Silver | Bronze | Total |
|---|---|---|---|---|---|
| 1 | Germany | 24 | 16 | 15 | 55 |
| 2 | Italy | 23 | 24 | 29 | 76 |
| 3 | Netherlands | 13 | 8 | 4 | 25 |
| 4 | Russia | 12 | 11 | 7 | 30 |
| 5 | Hungary | 8 | 11 | 7 | 26 |
| 6 | France | 6 | 12 | 13 | 31 |
| 7 | Greece | 1 | 2 | 2 | 5 |
| 8 | Switzerland | 1 | 2 | 1 | 4 |
| 9 | Great Britain | 1 | 1 | 0 | 2 |
| 10 | Czech Republic | 1 | 0 | 6 | 7 |
| 11 | Ukraine | 1 | 0 | 0 | 1 |
| 12 | Spain | 0 | 4 | 5 | 9 |
| 13 | Czechoslovakia | 0 | 1 | 0 | 1 |
| 14 | Bulgaria | 0 | 0 | 2 | 2 |
| 15 | Portugal | 0 | 0 | 1 | 1 |
| Totals (15 entries) | | 91 | 92 | 92 | 275 |

=== High diving (2022–2026) ===
| Rank | Nation | Gold | Silver | Bronze | Total |
|---|---|---|---|---|---|
| 1 | Romania | 2 | 1 | 0 | 3 |
| 2 | Ukraine | 1 | 2 | 0 | 3 |
| 3 | Germany | 1 | 0 | 1 | 2 |
| 4 | Italy | 0 | 1 | 2 | 3 |
| 5 | France | 0 | 0 | 1 | 1 |
| Totals (5 entries) | | 4 | 4 | 4 | 12 |

=== Water polo (1926–1997) ===
| Rank | Nation | Gold | Silver | Bronze | Total |
|---|---|---|---|---|---|
| 1 | Hungary | 12 | 8 | 2 | 22 |
| 2 | Soviet Union | 5 | 3 | 2 | 10 |
| 3 | Netherlands | 5 | 1 | 3 | 9 |
| 4 | Italy | 5 | 0 | 5 | 10 |
| 5 | West Germany | 2 | 0 | 2 | 4 |
| 6 | Yugoslavia | 1 | 7 | 4 | 12 |
| 7 | Germany | 0 | 3 | 2 | 5 |
| 8 | Sweden | 0 | 3 | 0 | 3 |
| 9 | Russia | 0 | 2 | 1 | 3 |
| 10 | France | 0 | 1 | 2 | 3 |
| 10 | Spain | 0 | 1 | 2 | 3 |
| 12 | East Germany | 0 | 1 | 0 | 1 |
| 12 | FR Yugoslavia | 0 | 1 | 0 | 1 |
| 14 | Belgium | 0 | 0 | 3 | 3 |
| 15 | Austria | 0 | 0 | 1 | 1 |
| Totals (15 entries) | | 30 | 31 | 29 | 90 |

== Multiple medalists in swimming (long course) ==
These table shows swimmers who have won at least 7 gold medals at the European Championships and is updated after the 2024 European Aquatics Championships.

Still active

=== Men ===
| # | Swimmer | Country | 1st place, gold medalist(s) | 2nd place, silver medalist(s) | 3rd place, bronze medalist(s) | Total |
|---|---|---|---|---|---|---|
| 1 | Alexander Popov | Soviet Union; Russia | 21 | 3 | 2 | 26 |
| 2 | Adam Peaty | Great Britain | 16 | 0 | 0 | 16 |
| 3 | László Cseh | Hungary | 14 | 4 | 5 | 23 |
| 4 | Michael Gross | West Germany | 13 | 4 | 2 | 19 |
| 5 | Pieter van den Hoogenband | Netherlands | 10 | 5 | 4 | 19 |
| 6 | Emiliano Brembilla | Italy | 10 | 3 | 0 | 13 |
| 7 | Filippo Magnini | Italy | 9 | 5 | 5 | 19 |
| 8 | Peter Nocke | West Germany | 9 | 1 | 0 | 10 |
| 9 | Duncan Scott | Great Britain | 8 | 4 | 0 | 12 |
| 10 | James Guy | Great Britain | 8 | 2 | 4 | 14 |
| 11 | Kristóf Milák | Hungary | 8 | 2 | 0 | 10 |
| 12 | Tamás Darnyi | Hungary | 8 | 0 | 0 | 8 |
| 13 | Oleh Lisohor | Ukraine | 7 | 3 | 3 | 13 |

=== Women ===
| # | Swimmer | Country | 1st place, gold medalist(s) | 2nd place, silver medalist(s) | 3rd place, bronze medalist(s) | Total |
|---|---|---|---|---|---|---|
| 1 | Sarah Sjöström | Sweden | 18 | 8 | 4 | 30 |
| 2 | Franziska van Almsick | Germany | 18 | 3 | 0 | 21 |
| 3 | Katinka Hosszú | Hungary | 15 | 6 | 4 | 25 |
| 4 | Freya Anderson | Great Britain | 11 | 3 | 4 | 18 |
| 5 | Heike Friedrich | East Germany; Germany | 11 | 2 | 0 | 13 |
| 6 | Simona Quadarella | Italy | 11 | 1 | 1 | 13 |
| 7 | Therese Alshammar | Sweden | 10 | 7 | 4 | 21 |
| 8 | Fran Halsall | Great Britain | 10 | 3 | 4 | 17 |
| 9 | Yana Klochkova | Ukraine | 10 | 2 | 4 | 16 |
| 10 | Sandra Völker | Germany | 9 | 4 | 4 | 17 |
| 11 | Krisztina Egerszegi | Hungary | 9 | 4 | 0 | 13 |
| 12 | Astrid Strauss | East Germany | 9 | 4 | 0 | 13 |
| 13 | Laure Manaudou | France | 9 | 1 | 3 | 13 |
| 14 | Kristin Otto | East Germany | 9 | 1 | 1 | 11 |
| 15 | Ute Geweniger | East Germany | 9 | 1 | 0 | 10 |
| 16 | Federica Pellegrini | Italy | 7 | 6 | 7 | 20 |
| 17 | Yuliya Yefimova | Russia | 7 | 4 | 2 | 13 |
| 18 | Mette Jacobsen | Denmark | 7 | 3 | 8 | 18 |
| 19 | Daniela Hunger | East Germany; Germany | 7 | 3 | 0 | 10 |
| 20 | Boglárka Kapás | Hungary | 7 | 2 | 4 | 13 |
| 20 | Ágnes Kovács | Hungary | 7 | 2 | 4 | 13 |
| 22 | Lucy Hope | Great Britain | 7 | 2 | 0 | 9 |
| 22 | Britta Steffen | Germany | 7 | 2 | 0 | 9 |

== See also ==
- List of European Aquatics Championships medalists in swimming (men)
- List of European Aquatics Championships medalists in swimming (women)
- List of European Aquatics Championships medalists in open water swimming
- List of European Aquatics Championships medalists in artistic swimming
- European Short Course Swimming Championships
