= Netherlands at the 1928 Summer Olympics =

- Flag of the Netherlands
- IOC code: NED
- NOC: Dutch Olympic Committee

in Amsterdam
- Competitors: 266 (222 men, 44 women) in 17 sports
- Medals Ranked 8th: Gold 6 Silver 9 Bronze 4 Total 19

Summer Olympics appearances (overview)
- 1900; 1904; 1908; 1912; 1920; 1924; 1928; 1932; 1936; 1948; 1952; 1956; 1960; 1964; 1968; 1972; 1976; 1980; 1984; 1988; 1992; 1996; 2000; 2004; 2008; 2012; 2016; 2020; 2024

Other related appearances
- 1906 Intercalated Games

The Netherlands was the host nation for the 1928 Summer Olympics in Amsterdam. 266 competitors, 222 men and 44 women, took part in 103 events in 17 sports.

== Medalists ==
On 11 August, the Netherlands won 7 medals on a single day. This remained the country's record until it won 8 medals on 28 July 2021 during the 2020 Summer Olympics.

| Medal | Name | Sport | Event | Date |
|---|---|---|---|---|
| Gold | Bep van Klaveren | Boxing | Men's featherweight | 11 August |
| Gold | Bernhard Leene, Daan van Dijk | Cycling | Men's tandem | 6 August |
| Gold | Charles Pahud de Mortanges | Equestrian | Individual eventing | 11 August |
| Gold | Gerard de Kruijff, Charles Pahud de Mortanges, Adolph van der Voort van Zijp | Equestrian | Team eventing | 11 August |
| Gold | Estella Agsteribbe, Petronella Burgerhof, Elka de Levie, Helena Nordheim, Anna Polak, Jud Simons, Jacoba Stelma, Jacomina van den Berg, Alida van den Bos, Anna van der Vegt, Petronella van Randwijk, Hendrika van Rumt | Gymnastics | Women's team all-around | 9 August |
| Gold | Marie Braun | Swimming | Women's 100 m backstroke | 11 August |
| Silver | Lien Gisolf | Athletics | Women's high jump | 5 August |
| Silver | Janus Braspennincx, Johannes Maas, Jan Pijnenburg, Piet van der Horst | Cycling | Men's team pursuit | 6 August |
| Silver | Antoine Mazairac | Cycling | Men's sprint | 6 August |
| Silver | Gerard Bosch van Drakestein | Cycling | Men's track time trial | 5 August |
| Silver | Gerard de Kruijff | Equestrian | Individual eventing | 11 August |
| Silver | Netherlands national field hockey team: Jan Ankerman; Jan Brand; Rein de Waal; Emile Duson; C. J. J. Hardebeck; T. F. Hubrecht; Gerrit Jannink; Adriaan Katte; August Kop; G. Leembruggen; H. J. L. Mangelaar Meertens; Otto Muller von Czernicki; Ab Tresling; W. J. van Citters; Tonny van Lierop; Paul van de Rovaart; C. J. van der Hagen; Robert van der Veen; J. J. van Tienhoven van den Bogaard; J. M. van Voorst van Beest; Haas Visser 't Hooft; N. Wenholt | Field hockey | | 26 May |
| Silver | Gerard de Vries Lentsch, Maarten de Wit, Lambertus Doedes, Hendrik Kersken, Johannes van Hoolwerff, Cornelis van Staveren | Sailing | 8 m class | 9 August |
| Silver | Marie Braun | Swimming | Women's 400 m freestyle | 6 August |
| Silver | Mietje Baron | Swimming | Women's 200 m breaststroke | 9 August |
| Bronze | Karel Miljon | Boxing | Men's light heavyweight | 11 August |
| Bronze | Gerard le Heux, Jan van Reede, Pierre Versteegh | Equestrian | Team dressage | 11 August |
| Bronze | Guus Scheffer | Weightlifting | Men's 75 kg | 29 July |
| Bronze | Jan Verheijen | Weightlifting | Men's 82.5 kg | 29 July |

== Athletics ==
Key

- Note – Ranks given for track events are within the athlete's heat only
- Q = Qualified for the next round
- q = Qualified for the next round as a fastest loser or, in field events, by position without achieving the qualifying target
- NR = National record
- N/A = Round not applicable for the event
- Bye = Athlete not required to compete in round
- NM = No mark

Men
Track & road events

| Athlete | Event | Round 1 | | Round 2 | | Semifinal | | Final | |
| Athlete | Event | Result | Rank | Result | Rank | Result | Rank | Result | Rank |
|---|---|---|---|---|---|---|---|---|---|
| Dolf Benz | 100 m | 11.4 | 4 | Did not advance | | | | | |
| Rinus van den Berge | 100 m | 11.1 | 2 Q | unknown | 4 | Did not advance | | | |
| Jaap Boot | 100 m | unknown | 3 | Did not advance | | | | | |
| Wilhelm Hennings | 100 m | 11.2 | 3 | Did not advance | | | | | |
| Rinus van den Berge | 200 m | unknown | 2 Q | unknown | 4 | Did not advance | | | |
| Harry Broos | 200 m | unknown | 2 Q | unknown | 5 | Did not advance | | | |
| Rinus van den Berge | 400 m | unknown | 4 | Did not advance | | | | | |
| Harry Broos | 400 m | unknown | 2 Q | unknown | 2 Q | 49.9 | 5 | Did not advance | |
| Andries Hoogerwerf | 400 m | unknown | 2 Q | unknown | 4 | Did not advance | | | |
| Adje Paulen | 400 m | unknown | 2 Q | unknown | 4 | Did not advance | | | |
| Andries Hoogerwerf | 800 m | unknown | 6 | —N/a | | Did not advance | | | |
| Adje Paulen | 800 m | unknown | 4 | —N/a | | Did not advance | | | |
| Guus Zeegers | 800 m | unknown | 4 | —N/a | | Did not advance | | | |
| Wilhelm Effern | 1500 m | unknown | 7 | —N/a | | | | Did not advance | |
| Frédéric du Hen | 1500 m | DNF | | —N/a | | | | Did not advance | |
| Guus Zeegers | 1500 m | unknown | 5 | —N/a | | | | Did not advance | |
| Jan Zeegers | 1500 m | unknown | 6 | —N/a | | | | Did not advance | |
| Pieter Gerbrands | 5000 m | DNF | | —N/a | | | | Did not advance | |
| Arie Klaase | 5000 m | unknown | 6 | —N/a | | | | Did not advance | |
| Nol Wolf | 5000 m | DNF | | —N/a | | | | Did not advance | |
| Bram Groeneweg | Marathon | —N/a | | | | | | DNF | |
| Henri Landheer | Marathon | —N/a | | | | | | 2:51:59 | 30 |
| Pleun van Leenen | Marathon | —N/a | | | | | | 3:14:37 | 56 |
| Teun Sprong | Marathon | —N/a | | | | | | DNF | |
| Willem van der Steen | Marathon | —N/a | | | | | | 3:19:53 | 57 |
| Joop Vermeulen | Marathon | —N/a | | | | | | 3:13:47 | 54 |
| Jan Britstra | 110m hurdles | unknown | 4 | —N/a | | Did not advance | | | |
| Arie Kaan | 110m hurdles | unknown | 4 | —N/a | | Did not advance | | | |
| Arie van Leeuwen | 110m hurdles | unknown | 4 | —N/a | | Did not advance | | | |
| Lau Spel | 110m hurdles | unknown | 3 | —N/a | | Did not advance | | | |
| Rinus van den Berge; Harry Broos; Andries Hoogerwerf; Adje Paulen | 4 x 400m relay | unknown | 4 | —N/a | | | | Did not advance | |

Field events

| Athlete | Event | Qualification | | Final | |
| Athlete | Event | Result | Rank | Result | Rank |
|---|---|---|---|---|---|
| Frits Bührman | High Jump | 1.70 | =28 | Did not advance | |
| Joop Kamstra | High Jump | 1.70 | =28 | Did not advance | |
| Henri Thesingh | High Jump | 1.77 | =19 | Did not advance | |
| Age van der Zee | Pole Vault | 3.30 | =14 | Did not advance | |

== Boxing ==
| Athlete | Event | Round of 32 | Round of 16 | Quarterfinals | Semifinals | Final / BM | |
| Athlete | Event | Opposition Result | Opposition Result | Opposition Result | Opposition Result | Opposition Result | Rank |
|---|---|---|---|---|---|---|---|
| Ben Bril | Flyweight | Bye | McDonagh (IRL); W | Lebanon (RSA); L | Did not advance | | |
| Bep van Klaveren | Featherweight | Bye | Panadez (ESP); W | Perry (GBR); W | Devin (USA); W | Peralta (ARG); W | 1st place, gold medalist(s) |
| David Baan | Lightweight | Bye | Webster (GBR); W | Nielsen (DEN); L | Did not advance | | |
| Cor Blommers | Welterweight | Bye | Annet (BEL); W | Landini (ARG); L | Did not advance | | |
| Karel Miljon | Light Heavyweight | —N/a | Johansson-Vallsater (SWE); W | Jackson (GBR); W | Pistulla (GER); L | McCorkindale (USA); W | 3rd place, bronze medalist(s) |
| Sam Olij | Heavyweight | —N/a | Goyder (BEL); W | Rodríguez (ARG); L | Did not advance | | |

== Cycling ==
Eleven cyclists, all men, represented the Netherlands in 1928.

Individual road race

- Leen Buis
- Janus Braspennincx
- Ben Duijker
- Anton Kuys

Team road race

- Leen Buis
- Janus Braspennincx
- Ben Duijker

Sprint

- Antoine Mazairac

Time trial

- Gerard Bosch van Drakestein

Tandem

- Bernard Leene
- Daan van Dijk

Team pursuit

- Janus Braspennincx
- Jan Maas
- Jan Pijnenburg
- Piet van der Horst
- Gerard Bosch van Drakestein

== Fencing ==
20 fencers, 17 men and 3 women, represented the Netherlands in 1928.

Men's foil

- Nicolaas Nederpeld
- Frans Mosman
- Paul Kunze

Men's team foil

- Frans Mosman, Doris de Jong, Nicolaas Nederpeld, Paul Kunze, Wouter Brouwer, Otto Schiff

Men's épée

- Willem Driebergen
- Pieter Mijer
- Arie de Jong

Men's team épée

- Leonard Kuypers, Arie de Jong, Henri Wijnoldy-Daniëls, Willem Driebergen, Alfred Labouchere, Karel John van den Brandeler

Men's sabre

- Arie de Jong
- Jan van der Wiel
- Henri Wijnoldy-Daniëls

Men's team sabre

- Cornelis Ekkart, Hendrik Hagens, Maarten van Dulm, Jan van der Wiel, Arie de Jong, Henri Wijnoldy-Daniëls

Women's foil

- Jo de Boer
- Adriana Admiraal-Meijerink
- Friederike Koderitsch

== Football ==
Round of 16

30 May 1928
19:00

| Netherlands | 0–2 | Uruguay |
|---|---|---|
| | Report | Scarone 20'; Urdinarán 86' |

Olympic Stadium, Amsterdam
Attendance: 27,730
Referee: John Langenus (Belgium)

Consolation tournament, First round

5 June 1928
14:00

| Netherlands | 3–1 | Belgium |
|---|---|---|
| Ghering 4'; Smeets 6'; Tap 63' | Report | Braine 85' |

Stadion Spangen, Rotterdam
Attendance: 20,000
Referee: Achille Gama (Italy)

Consolation tournament, Final

8 June 1928
14:00

| Netherlands | 2–2 (a.e.t.) | Chile |
|---|---|---|
| Ghering 59'; Smeets 66' | Report | Bravo 55'; Alfaro 89' |

Stadion Spangen, Rotterdam
Attendance: 18,000
Referee: Guillermo Comorera (Spain)

After a coin toss the Netherlands were declared winners and were handed the trophy which had been on offer (by the NVB), but gave it to Chile to take home as a 'memento' of the Netherlands, the Olympic Games and their Dutch football friends.

== Gymnastics ==
The Netherlands won the first Women's Gymnastics competition in Olympic history.

Five of the Olympics' first gold medal team were Jewish women: Estella Agsteribbe, Anna Dresden-Polak, Elka de Levie, Helena Nordheim, and Jud Simons. Of the five, only Levie survived the Holocaust; the rest were murdered in gas chambers at Auschwitz-Birkenau and Sobibor

== Hockey ==
Roster

The following is the Netherlands roster in the men's field hockey tournament of the 1928 Summer Olympics.

- Jan Ankerman
- Jan Brand
- Rein de Waal
- Emile Duson
- Gerrit Jannink
- Adriaan Katte
- August Kop
- Ab Tresling
- Paul van de Rovaart
- Robert van der Veen
- Haas Visser 't Hooft
- C. J. J. Hardebeck
- T. F. Hubrecht
- G. Leembruggen
- H. J. L. Mangelaar Meertens
- Otto Muller von Czernicki
- W. J. van Citters
- C. J. van der Hagen
- Tonny van Lierop
- J. J. van Tienhoven van den Bogaard
- J. M. van Voorst van Beest
- N. Wenholt

Group play

| Pos | Team | Pld | W | D | L | GF | GA | GD | Pts | Qualification |
|---|---|---|---|---|---|---|---|---|---|---|
| 1 | Netherlands (H) | 3 | 2 | 1 | 0 | 8 | 2 | +6 | 5 | Gold medal match |
| 2 | Germany | 3 | 2 | 0 | 1 | 8 | 3 | +5 | 4 | Bronze medal match |
| 3 | France | 3 | 1 | 0 | 2 | 2 | 8 | −6 | 2 | |
| 4 | Spain | 3 | 0 | 1 | 2 | 3 | 8 | −5 | 1 | |

Source: 1928 Official Report, p. 689
(H) Hosts

17 May 1928
15:15

| Netherlands | 5–0 | France |
|---|---|---|
| Van de Rovaart 20'; Tresling 23'; Jannink 35', 37'; Van der Veen 65' | Report |

Olympisch Stadion, Amsterdam
Attendance: 5,500
Umpires:
R. Liégeois (BEL)
E. de Cindric (HUN)

19 May 1928
16:00

| Netherlands | 2–1 | Germany |
|---|---|---|
| Van de Rovaart 20'; Van der Veen 32' | Report | Haag 7' |

Olympisch Stadion, Amsterdam
Attendance: 6,000
Umpires:
R. Liégeois (BEL)
B. Turnbull (IND)

23 May 1928
16:45

| Netherlands | 1–1 | Spain |
|---|---|---|
| Van der Veen 20' | Report | De Roig 63' |

Old Stadium, Amsterdam
Attendance: 2,750
Umpires:
P. Regibo (BEL)
R. Be-Cavin (SUI)

Gold Medal Match

26 May 1928
15:45

| (gold) India | 3–0 | Netherlands (silver) |
|---|---|---|
| Chand 15', 36'; Marthins ?' | Report |

Olympisch Stadion, Amsterdam
Attendance: 40,000
Umpires:
w. Simon (GER)
R. Liégeois (BEL)

== Modern pentathlon ==
Three male pentathletes represented the Netherlands in 1928.

| Athlete | Event | Shooting rank | Swimming rank | Fencing rank | Running rank | Equestrian rank | Total | Rank |
|---|---|---|---|---|---|---|---|---|
| Tjeerd Pasma | Men's | 32 | 13 | 34 | 5 | 24 | 108 | =24 |
| Willem van Rhijn | Men's | 11 | 10 | 5 | 17 | 28 | 71 | 9 |
| Christiaan Tonnet | Men's | 8 | 24 | 27 | 4 | 6 | 69 | =7 |

== Swimming ==
Men

| Athlete | Event | Heat | | Semifinal | | Final | |
| Athlete | Event | Time | Rank | Time | Rank | Time | Rank |
|---|---|---|---|---|---|---|---|
| Henk van Essen | 100 m freestyle | 1:07.4 | | Did not advance | | | |
| Dick de Man | 1500 m freestyle | 23:03.2 | | Did not advance | | | |
| Leen Korpershoek | 200 m breaststroke | 3:04.0 | | Did not advance | | | |
| Henk van Essen; Gerrit van Voorst; Piet Bannenberg; Johannes Brink | 4 × 200 m freestyle relay | —N/a | | Unknown | | Did not advance | |

Women

| Athlete | Event | Heat | | Semifinal | | Final | |
| Athlete | Event | Time | Rank | Time | Rank | Time | Rank |
|---|---|---|---|---|---|---|---|
| Maria Vierdag | 100 m freestyle | 1:14.4 | | Unknown | | Did not advance | |
| Truus Baumeister | 400 m freestyle | 6:26.4 | | Did not advance | | | |
| Marie Braun | 400 m freestyle | 5:53.8 | | 5:54.6 | | 5:57.8 | 2nd place, silver medalist(s) |
| Marie Braun | 100 m backstroke | 1:21.6 WR | | —N/a | | 1:22.0 | 1st place, gold medalist(s) |
| Jeanne Grendel | 100 m backstroke | 1:26.2 | | —N/a | | Did not advance | |
| Mietje Baron | 200 m breaststroke | 3:20.2 | | 3:15.4 | | 3:15.2 | 2nd place, silver medalist(s) |
| Cornelia van Gelder | 200 m breaststroke | Unknown | | Did not advance | | | |
| Margaretha van Norden | 200 m breaststroke | 3:27.2 | | Unknown | | Did not advance | |
| Eva Smits; Truus Baumeister; Maria Vierdag; Marie Braun | 4 × 100 m freestyle relay | —N/a | | 5:08.8 | | DSQ | |

== Weightlifting ==
| Athlete | Event | Press | Snatch | Clean & Jerk | Total | Rank |
|---|---|---|---|---|---|---|
| Cornelis Compter | Men's -60 kg | 75 | 70 | 92.5 | 237.5 | 19 |
| Hendrik de Wolf | Men's -60 kg | 72.5 | 75 | 100 | 247.5 | =16 |
| Gerrit Roos | Men's -67.5 kg | 75 | 75 | 105 | 255 | 14 |
| Cor Tabak | Men's -67.5 kg | 77.5 | 82.5 | 115 | 270 | 10 |
| Guus Scheffer | Men's -75 kg | 97.5 | 105 | 125 | 327.5 | 3rd place, bronze medalist(s) |
| Joop Zalm | Men's -75 kg | 92.5 | 85 | 107.5 | 285 | =9 |
| Willem Tholen | Men's -82.5 kg | 87.5 | 90 | 120 | 297.5 | 12 |
| Jan Verheijen | Men's -82.5 kg | 95 | 105 | 137.5 | 337.5 | 3rd place, bronze medalist(s) |
| Henk Verheijen | Men's +82.5 kg | 102.5 | 100 | - | - | - |
| Minus Verheijen | Men's +82.5 kg | 100 | 90 | 130 | 320 | 12 |

== Demonstration sports ==
=== Korfball ===
Two Dutch teams gave a korfball demonstration, with a match on 6 August in the Olympisch Stadion.
