= Swimming at the 1928 Summer Olympics – Men's 4 × 200 metre freestyle relay =

Men's 4 × 200 metre freestyle relay at the Games of the IX Olympiad
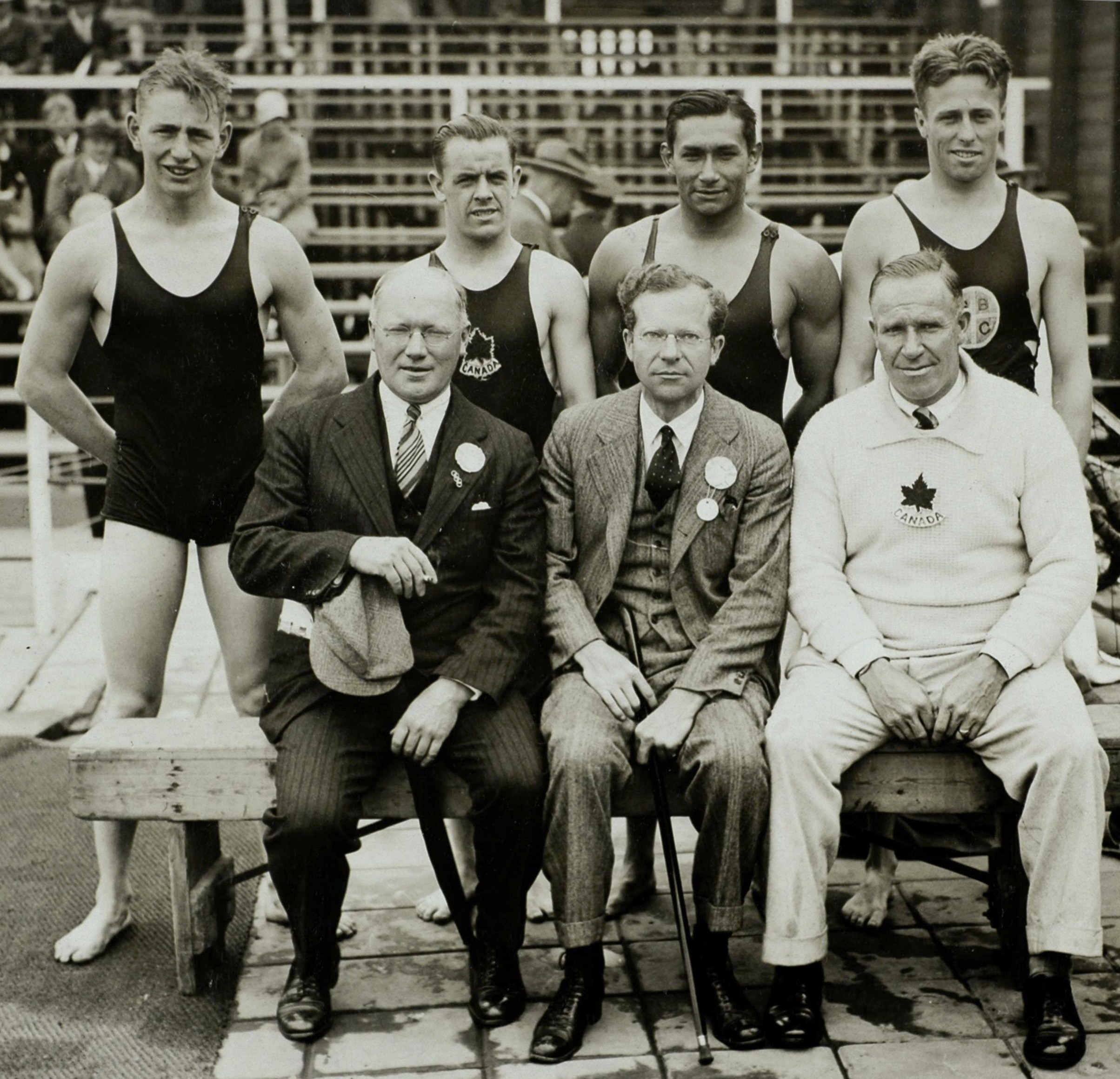
- Bronze medal team from Canada. Back row, left to right: Bourne, Thompson, Spence, and Ault
- Venue: Olympic Sports Park Swim Stadium
- Date: 9 August 1928 (heats); 11 August 1928 (final)
- Competitors: 55 from 13 nations
- Teams: 13
- Winning time: 9:36.2

Medalists
| 1st place, gold medalist(s) | | Austin Clapp; George Kojac; Walter Laufer; Johnny Weissmuller | United States |
| 2nd place, silver medalist(s) | | Nobuo Arai; Tokuhei Sada; Katsuo Takaishi; Hiroshi Yoneyama | Japan |
| 3rd place, bronze medalist(s) | | Garnet Ault; Munroe Bourne; Walter Spence; James Thompson | Canada |

The men's 4 × 200 metre freestyle relay was a swimming event held as part of the swimming at the 1928 Summer Olympics programme. It was the fifth appearance of the event, which was established in 1908. The competition was held on Saturday 11 August 1928.

Fifty-five swimmers from 13 nations competed.

Note: The International Olympic Committee medal database shows only these four swimmers from the United States as gold medalist. Paul Samson and David Young both swam in the semi-final are not credited with medals. Also the Japanese Kazuo Noda who swam in the semi-final is not listed as silver medalist.

== Records ==
These were the standing world and Olympic records (in minutes) prior to the 1928 Summer Olympics.

| World record | 9:49.6 | (Germany) (Germany) (Germany) (Germany) | | 1927 |
| Olympic record | 9:53.4 | (United States) Ralph Breyer (United States) Harry Glancy (United States) Wally O'Connor (United States) Johnny Weissmuller | Paris (FRA) | 20 July 1924 |

The United States with Paul Samson, Austin Clapp, David Young, and Johnny Weissmuller set a new world record in the semi-final with 9:38.8 minutes. In the final the United States with Austin Clapp, Walter Laufer, George Kojac, and Johnny Weissmuller bettered the world record to 9:36.2 minutes.

== Results ==
=== Semifinals ===
The fastest two in each semi-final and the fastest third-placed from across the semi-finals advanced to the final.

==== Semifinal 1 ====
| Rank | Nation | Swimmers | Time | Notes |
|---|---|---|---|---|
| 1 | United States | Paul Samson; Austin Clapp; David Young; Johnny Weissmuller | 9:38.8 | Q, WR |
| 2 | Japan | Kazuo Noda; Hiroshi Yoneyama; Tokuhei Sada; Katsuo Takaishi | 9:42.6 | Q |
| 3 | Sweden | Aulo Gustafsson; Sven-Pelle Pettersson; Eskil Lundahl; Arne Borg | 10:03.2 | Q |
| 4 | Argentina | Francisco Uranga; Amilcar Álvarez; Emilio Vives; Alberto Zorrilla | Unknown | |

==== Semifinal 2 ====
| Rank | Nation | Swimmers | Time | Notes |
|---|---|---|---|---|
| 1 | Canada | Munroe Bourne; James Thompson; Garnet Ault; Walter Spence | 9:55.0 | Q |
| 2 | Great Britain | Edward Peter; Joseph Whiteside; Reginald Sutton; Albert Dickin | 10:16.6 | Q |
| 3 | France | Philippe Tisson; Gustave Klein; Jean Taris; Albert Vandeplancke | 10:31.4 | |
| 4 | Netherlands | Henk van Essen; Gerrit van Voorst; Piet Bannenberg; Johannes Brink | Unknown | |
| 5 | Belgium | Louis Van Parijs; Pierre Coppieters; Martial van Schelle; Gérard Blitz | Unknown | |

==== Semifinal 3 ====
| Rank | Nation | Swimmers | Time | Notes |
|---|---|---|---|---|
| 1 | Hungary | András Wanié; Rezső Wanié; Géza Szigritz; István Bárány | 9:46.6 | Q |
| 2 | Spain | Francisco Segalá; Estanislao Artal; Ramón Artigas; José González | 11:50.6 | Q |
| 3 | Italy | Emilio Polli; Giuseppe Perentin; Antonio Conelli; Paolo Costoli | 10:03.2 | |
| 4 | Germany | Karl Schubert; August Heitmann; Friedel Berges; Herbert Heinrich | Unknown | |

=== Final ===
| Rank | Nation | Swimmers | Time | Notes |
|---|---|---|---|---|
| 1st place, gold medalist(s) | United States | Austin Clapp; Walter Laufer; George Kojac; Johnny Weissmuller | 9:36.2 | WR |
| 2nd place, silver medalist(s) | Japan | Hiroshi Yoneyama; Nobuo Arai; Tokuhei Sada; Katsuo Takaishi | 9:41.4 | |
| 3rd place, bronze medalist(s) | Canada | Munroe Bourne; James Thompson; Garnet Ault; Walter Spence | 9:47.8 | |
| 4 | Hungary | András Wanié; Rezső Wanié; Géza Szigritz; István Bárány | 9:57.0 | |
| 5 | Sweden | Aulo Gustafsson; Sven-Pelle Pettersson; Eskil Lundahl; Arne Borg | 10:01.8 | |
| 6 | Great Britain | Reginald Sutton; Joseph Whiteside; Edward Peter; Albert Dickin | 10:15.8 | |
| 7 | Spain | José González; Estanislao Artal; Ramón Artigas; Francisco Segalá | Unknown | |
