= Hungary at the 1928 Summer Olympics =

- IOC code: HUN
- NOC: Hungarian Olympic Committee

in Amsterdam
- Competitors: 109 in 12 sports
- Flag bearer: Kálmán Egri
- Medals Ranked 9th: Gold 4 Silver 5 Bronze 0 Total 9

Summer Olympics appearances (overview)
- 1896; 1900; 1904; 1908; 1912; 1920; 1924; 1928; 1932; 1936; 1948; 1952; 1956; 1960; 1964; 1968; 1972; 1976; 1980; 1984; 1988; 1992; 1996; 2000; 2004; 2008; 2012; 2016; 2020; 2024

Other related appearances
- 1906 Intercalated Games

Hungary competed at the 1928 Summer Olympics in Amsterdam, Netherlands. 109 competitors, 93 men and 16 women, took part in 63 events in 12 sports.

== Medalists ==
Medal	Name	Sport	Event	Date
Gold	Lajos Keresztes	Wrestling	Men's Greco-Roman lightweight	5 August
Gold	Ödön Tersztyánszky; János Garay; Attila Petschauer; József Rády; Sándor Gombos; Gyula Glykais	Fencing	Men's team sabre	9 August
Gold	Ödön Tersztyánszky	Fencing	Men's sabre	11 August
Gold	Antal Kocsis	Boxing	Men's flyweight	11 August
Silver	Béla Szepes	Athletics	Men's javelin throw	2 August
Silver	László Papp	Wrestling	Men's Greco-Roman middleweight	5 August
Silver	Hungary men's national water polo team: István Barta; Olivér Halassy; Márton Homonnai; Sándor Ivády; Alajos Keserű; Ferenc Keserű; József Vértesy	Water polo	Men's tournament	10 August
Silver	Attila Petschauer	Fencing	Men's sabre	11 August
Silver	István Bárány	Swimming	Men's 100 metre freestyle	11 August

Default sort order: Medal, Date, Name

Medals by sport
Sport	1st place, gold medalist(s)	2nd place, silver medalist(s)	3rd place, bronze medalist(s)	Total
Fencing	2	1	0	3
Wrestling	1	1	0	2
Boxing	1	0	0	1
Athletics	0	1	0	1
Swimming	0	1	0	1
Water polo	0	1	0	1
Total	4	5	0	9

=== Multiple medalists ===
The following competitors won multiple medals at the 1928 Olympic Games.

Name	Medal	Sport	Event
Ödön Tersztyánszky	Gold; Gold	Fencing	Men's team sabre Men's sabre
Attila Petschauer	Gold; Silver	Fencing	Men's team sabre Men's sabre

== Boxing ==
Men's Flyweight (– 50.8 kg)

- Antal Kocsis

- First Round — Bye
- Second Round — Defeated José Villanova Pueyo (ESP), points
- Quarterfinals — Defeated Hubert Ausböck (GER), points
- Semifinals — Defeated Carlo Covagnioli (ITA), points
- Final — Defeated Armand Apell (FRA), points

== Fencing ==
17 fencers, 14 men and 3 women, represented Hungary in 1928.

Men's foil

- György Rozgonyi
- Zoltán Schenker
- Gusztáv Kálniczky

Men's team foil

- Ödön von Tersztyánszky, György Rozgonyi, György Piller-Jekelfalussy, József Rády, Gusztáv Kálniczky, Péter Tóth

Men's épée

- József Rády
- János Hajdú
- Ottó Hátszeghy

Men's team épée

- József Rády, János Hajdú, Albert Bógathy, György Piller-Jekelfalussy, Ottó Hátszeghy

Men's sabre

- Ödön von Tersztyánszky
- Attila Petschauer
- Sándor Gombos

Men's team sabre

- Ödön von Tersztyánszky, János Garay, Attila Petschauer, József Rády, Sándor Gombos, Gyula Glykais

Women's foil

- Margit Danÿ
- Gizella Tary
- Erna Bogen-Bogáti

== Modern pentathlon ==
One male fencer represented Hungary in 1928.

- Tivadar Filótás

== Swimming ==
Men

Athlete	Event	Heat		Semifinal		Final	
Athlete	Event	Time	Rank	Time	Rank	Time	Rank
István Bárány	100 m freestyle	1:01.2		1:00.8		59.8	2nd place, silver medalist(s)
Antal Gáborfi	100 m freestyle	1:04.0		1:04.8		Did not advance	
Rezső Wanié	100 m freestyle	1:03.4		1:03.8		Did not advance	
Géza Szigritz	400 m freestyle	5:41.0		Did not advance			
Rezső Wanié	400 m freestyle	5:35.2		Did not advance			
Géza Szigritz	100 m backstroke	1:15.6		Did not advance			
András Wanié; Rezső Wanié; Géza Szigritz; István Bárány	4 × 200 metre freestyle relay	—N/a		9:46.6		9:57.0	4

Women

Athlete	Event	Heat		Semifinal		Final	
Athlete	Event	Time	Rank	Time	Rank	Time	Rank
Margit Sipos	100 m freestyle	1:18.8		Did not advance			
Sarolta Stieber	100 m freestyle	1:22.2		DNF		Did not advance	
