= Swimming at the 1928 Summer Olympics – Men's 100 metre freestyle =

Men's 100 metre freestyle at the Games of the IX Olympiad
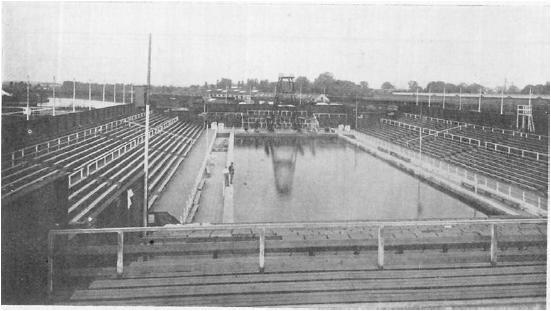
- The stadium
- Venue: Olympic Sports Park Swim Stadium
- Dates: 10–11 August
- Competitors: 30 from 17 nations
- Winning time: 58.6 OR

Medalists
1st place, gold medalist(s)		Johnny Weissmuller; United States
2nd place, silver medalist(s)		István Bárány; Hungary
3rd place, bronze medalist(s)		Katsuo Takaishi; Japan

The men's 100 metre freestyle was a swimming event held as part of the swimming at the 1928 Summer Olympics programme. It was the seventh appearance of the event, which had not been featured only at the 1900 Games. The competition was held on Friday and Saturday, 10 and 11 August 1928. Thirty swimmers from 17 nations competed. Nations had been limited to three swimmers each since the 1924 Games. Johnny Weissmuller of the United States repeated as gold medalist in the event, the second man to do so (after Duke Kahanamoku, who Weissmuller had beaten in 1924 for his first gold). It was the fifth consecutive victory for an American swimmer in the men's 100 metre freestyle. István Bárány earned Hungary's first medal in the event since 1908 with his silver. Katsuo Takaishi's bronze was Japan's first men's 100 metre freestyle medal. Bárány and Takaishi prevented the Americans from sweeping the medals a third consecutive time (1920 and 1924), as the United States swimmers finished first, fourth, and fifth.

== Background ==
This was the seventh appearance of the men's 100 metre freestyle. The event has been held at every Summer Olympics except 1900 (when the shortest freestyle was the 200 metres), though the 1904 version was measured in yards rather than metres.

Two of the five finalists from 1924 returned: gold medalist Johnny Weissmuller of the United States and fifth-place finisher Katsuo Takaishi of Japan. Weissmuller, as in 1924, was a heavy favorite in the event. He held the world record and had not been beaten in seven years.

Chile, Panama, and Poland each made their debut in the event. The United States made its seventh appearance, having competed at each edition of the event to date.

== Competition format ==
This freestyle swimming competition used a three-round (quarterfinals, semifinals, final) format. The advancement rule was the one used since 1912; for each round before the final, the top two in each heat plus the fastest third-place swimmer would advance. There were 7 heats of between 3 and 5 swimmers, allowing 15 swimmers to advance to the semifinals. The 3 semifinals had 5 swimmers each; 7 advanced to the final.

Each race involved two lengths of the 50-metre pool.

== Records ==
These were the standing world and Olympic records (in seconds) prior to the 1928 Summer Olympics.

World record	Johnny Weissmuller (USA)	57.4	Miami, United States	17 February 1924
Olympic record	Johnny Weissmuller (USA)	59.0	Paris, France	20 July 1924

Johnny Weissmuller improved his own Olympic record in the semifinals with 58.6 seconds and equalized this time again in the final.

== Schedule ==
Date	Time	Round
Friday, 10 August 1928	10:00; 16:00	Heats; Semifinals
Saturday, 11 August 1928	16:35	Final

== Results ==
=== Heats ===
The fastest two in each heat and the fastest third-placed from across the heats advanced.

==== Heat 1 ====
Rank	Swimmer	Nation	Time	Notes
1	Walter Laufer	United States	1:00.8	Q
2	Katsuo Takaishi	Japan	1:01.2	Q
3	August Heitmann	Germany	1:02.2	q
4	Eskil Lundahl	Sweden	1:03.0	
5	Hernán Schüler	Chile	Unknown	

==== Heat 2 ====
Rank	Swimmer	Nation	Time	Notes
1	Rezső Wanié	Hungary	1:03.4	Q
2	Francisco Uranga	Argentina	1:05.6	Q
3	Gustave Klein	France	1:05.8	
4	Mario Astaburuaga	Chile	Unknown	
5	Martial van Schelle	Belgium	Unknown	

==== Heat 3 ====
Rank	Swimmer	Nation	Time	Notes
1	Johnny Weissmuller	United States	1:00.0	Q
2	Walter Spence	Canada	1:00.6	Q
3	Norman Brooks	Great Britain	1:03.4	
4	Herbert Heinrich	Germany	Unknown	

==== Heat 4 ====
Rank	Swimmer	Nation	Time	Notes
1	Antal Gáborfi	Hungary	1:04.0	Q
2	Antonio Conelli	Italy	1:07.0	Q
3	Adán Gordón	Panama	1:10.8	

==== Heat 5 ====
Rank	Swimmer	Nation	Time	Notes
1	Alberto Zorrilla	Argentina	1:01.8	Q
2	Knut Olsen	Norway	1:05.0	Q
3	Sven-Pelle Pettersson	Sweden	1:06.4	
4	Faelo Zúñiga	Chile	Unknown	

==== Heat 6 ====
Rank	Swimmer	Nation	Time	Notes
1	George Kojac	United States	1:01.6	Q
2	Karl Schubert	Germany	1:03.8	Q
3	Reginald Sutton	Great Britain	1:04.0	
4	Munroe Bourne	Canada	Unknown	

==== Heat 7 ====
Rank	Swimmer	Nation	Time	Notes
1	István Bárány	Hungary	1:01.2	Q
2	Emilio Polli	Italy	1:04.0	Q
3	Henk van Essen	Netherlands	1:07.4	
4	José González	Spain	Unknown	
5	Władysław Kuncewicz	Poland	1:10.8	

=== Semifinals ===
The fastest two in each semi-final and the fastest third-placed from across the semi-finals advanced.

==== Semifinal 1 ====
Rank	Swimmer	Nation	Time	Notes
1	Katsuo Takaishi	Japan	1:00.0	Q
2	Walter Laufer	United States	1:00.6	Q
3	Walter Spence	Canada	1:01.4	q
4	Antal Gáborfi	Hungary	1:04.8	
5	Antonio Conelli	Italy	Unknown	

==== Semifinal 2 ====
Rank	Swimmer	Nation	Time	Notes
1	George Kojac	United States	1:01.0	Q
2	Alberto Zorrilla	Argentina	1:01.6	Q
3	Rezső Wanié	Hungary	1:03.8	
4	Francisco Uranga	Argentina	Unknown	
5	Karl Schubert	Germany	Unknown	

==== Semifinal 3 ====
Rank	Swimmer	Nation	Time	Notes
1	Johnny Weissmuller	United States	58.6	Q, OR
2	István Bárány	Hungary	1:00.8	Q
3	August Heitmann	Germany	1:03.6	
4	Knut Olsen	Norway	Unknown	
5	Emilio Polli	Italy	Unknown	

=== Final ===
Saturday 11 August 1928:

Rank	Swimmer	Nation	Time	Notes
1st place, gold medalist(s)	Johnny Weissmuller	United States	58.6	=OR
2nd place, silver medalist(s)	István Bárány	Hungary	59.8	
3rd place, bronze medalist(s)	Katsuo Takaishi	Japan	1:00.0	
4	George Kojac	United States	1:00.8	
5	Walter Laufer	United States	1:01.0	
6	Walter Spence	Canada	1:01.4	
7	Alberto Zorrilla	Argentina	1:01.6	

== Results summary ==
Rank	Swimmer	Nation	Heats	Semifinals	Final	Notes
1st place, gold medalist(s)	Johnny Weissmuller	United States	1:00.0	58.6	58.6	OR
2nd place, silver medalist(s)	István Bárány	Hungary	1:01.2	1:00.8	59.8	
3rd place, bronze medalist(s)	Katsuo Takaishi	Japan	1:01.2	1:00.0	1:00.0	
4	George Kojac	United States	1:01.6	1:01.0	1:00.8	
5	Walter Laufer	United States	1:00.8	1:00.6	1:01.0	
6	Walter Spence	Canada	1:00.6	1:01.4	1:01.4	
7	Alberto Zorrilla	Argentina	1:01.8	1:01.6	1:01.6	
8	August Heitmann	Germany	1:02.2	1:03.6	Did not advance	
9	Rezső Wanié	Hungary	1:03.4	1:03.8	Did not advance	
10	Antal Gáborfi	Hungary	1:04.0	1:04.8	Did not advance	
11	Knut Olsen	Norway	1:05.0	Unknown	Did not advance	4th in semifinal
11	Francisco Uranga	Argentina	1:05.6	Unknown	Did not advance	4th in semifinal
13	Antonio Conelli	Italy	1:07.0	Unknown	Did not advance	5th in semifinal
13	Emillio Polli	Italy	1:04.0	Unknown	Did not advance	5th in semifinal
13	Karl Schubert	Germany	1:03.8	Unknown	Did not advance	5th in semifinal
16	Eskil Lundahl	Sweden	1:03.0	Did not advance		
17	Norman Brooks	Great Britain	1:03.4	Did not advance		
18	Reginald Sutton	Great Britain	1:04.0	Did not advance		
19	Gustave Klein	France	1:05.8	Did not advance		
20	Sven-Pelle Pettersson	Sweden	1:06.4	Did not advance		
21	Henk van Essen	Netherlands	1:07.4	Did not advance		
22	José González	Spain	Unknown	Did not advance		Between 1:07.4 and 1:10.8
23	Adán Gordón	Panama	1:10.8	Did not advance		
23	Władysław Kuncewicz	Poland	1:10.8	Did not advance		5th in heat
25	Mario Astaburuaga	Chile	Unknown	Did not advance		4th in heat
25	Munroe Bourne	Canada	Unknown	Did not advance		4th in heat
25	Herbert Heinrich	Germany	Unknown	Did not advance		4th in heat
25	Faelo Zúñiga	Chile	Unknown	Did not advance		4th in heat
29	Hernán Schüler	Chile	Unknown	Did not advance		5th in heat
29	Martial van Schelle	Belgium	Unknown	Did not advance		5th in heat
