= Gambi =

Gambi is a surname. It may refer to:

== People ==
- Gambi (rapper) (born 1999), French rapper
- Gianni Gambi (also Giovanni; 1907–1986), Italian swimmer
- Letizia Gambi, Italian singer-songwriter and actress
- Vincenzo Gambi (died 1819), Italian pirate

== Fictional characters ==
- Paul Gambi, a fictional tailor appearing in comic published by DC Comics
- Peter Gambi, a fictional character appearing in comics published by DC Comics
