= Erich Rademacher =

German swimmer (1901-1979)

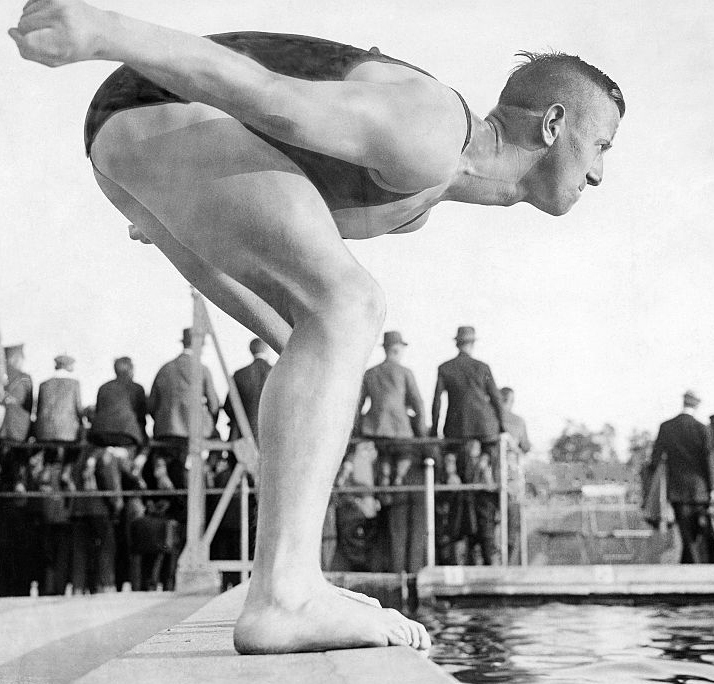
- Rademacher in 1932

Personal information
- Full name: Fritz Albert Erich Rademacher
- Nickname: Ete
- Born: 9 June 1901 Magdeburg, German Empire
- Died: 2 April 1979 (aged 77) Stuttgart, West Germany

Sport
- Sport: Swimming
- Strokes: Breaststroke
- Club: SC Hellas Magdeburg
Medal record
Representing Germany
Water polo
Olympic Games
Gold medal – first place	1928 Amsterdam	Team
Silver medal – second place	1932 Los Angeles	Team
European Championships
Bronze medal – third place	1926 Budapest	Team
Silver medal – second place	1931 Paris	Team
Swimming
Olympic Games
Silver medal – second place	1928 Amsterdam	200 m breaststroke
European Championships
Gold medal – first place	1926 Budapest	200 m breaststroke
Gold medal – first place	1927 Bologna	200 m breaststroke

Fritz Albert Erich "Ete" Rademacher (9 June 1901 – 2 April 1979) was a German breaststroke swimmer and water polo goalkeeper who competed at the 1928 and 1932 Olympics. In 1928 he was a member of the German water polo team that won the gold medal, he also won a silver medal in the 200 metres breaststroke. Four years later he won another silver medal with the German water polo team.

== Birth ==
Erich Rademacher was born on 9 June 1901 in Magdeburg, Kingdom of Prussia, German Empire, to Heinrich Rademacher.

== Early years ==
At 9 years old, on Christmas Eve, Ete received an invitation to become a member of the prestigious Hellas Magdeburg swim club, which was considered the best swim club in the country at the time. The invitation was received by his father, Heinrich, in the mail, and read: "die Vorstandversammlung vom 23. Dezember des Jahres Ihrem Antrag entsprochen und Ihren Sohn Erich in die Jugend-Abteilung unseres Clubs aufgenommen hat.", which very roughly translates to "we have decided to accept Erich into the youth department of our club". The letter went on to say: "Wir heißen Ihren Sohn herzlich willkommen, bitten Sie aber, um den in unseren Aufnahmebedingungen übernommenen Verpflichtungen nach besten Kräften gerecht werden zu können, ihn in seinem und unserem Interesse zum regelmäßigen Besuch unserer Übungsabende anhalten zu wollen.", which very roughly translates to "We warmly welcome your son, but ask you to do justice to the obligations made in our reception conditions to the best of his ability to ensure that he wants to attend our evening practices regularly."

Rademacher went to school to train as an insurance clerk.

== Swimming career ==
Rademacher was one of the only athletes at the time to have a manager, by the name of Kurt Behrens. Behrens increased Rademacher's popularity in the US swimming circles, and likely also funded some of his international tours.

=== National titles ===
In 1918, Rademacher became national champion in the 100 metre backstroke, the first of many national titles. From 1919-1927 excluding 1922, Rademacher was the national champion in the 100 metre breaststroke, meaning he was national champion in this event 7 times. In 1928, he became national champion in the 200 metre breaststroke. From 1924 to 1928, he was a national champion in the 4x100 metre freestyle relay. He was a national champion as the goalkeeper of the Hellas Magdeburg team in water polo from 1924 to 1926, then again from 1928 to 1931 and again in 1933. He also had other national titles in other less common disciplines. Through his whole career, Rademacher set 15 German national records.

Rademacher also won two Hungarian national championships, one British national championship, one Czechoslovak national championship and a US national championship.

=== European titles ===
At the 1926 European Championships in Budapest, he took home a bronze medal with his team in water polo, and became the European Champion in the Men's 200 metre breaststroke. He defended this title again in 1927. Finally, at the 1931 European Championships in Paris, he took home a silver medal with his team in water polo.

=== Olympic titles ===
Unfortunately for Rademacher, he was unable to compete in the 1920 and 1924 Olympic Games as Germany was not admitted after World War I.

By the 1928 Amsterdam Olympics, Rademacher was heavy favorite to win the gold medal in the men's 200 metres breaststroke event, as he held the world record of 2:48. However, Yoshiyuki Tsuruta employed an unforeseen strategy that was allowed at the time, of staying underwater for most of the race. Tsuruta beat Rademacher, setting a new world record of 2:45.4.

However, this disappointment was short lived, as Rademacher won gold as the goalkeeper for the German water polo team in the men's water polo.

This was followed 4 years later at the 1932 Los Angeles olympics, where Germany won silver in the men's water polo event, with Rademacher in goal.

=== World records ===
By 1925, Rademacher owned every single breaststroke world record in breaststroke events from 50 yards to 500 metres.

Rademacher set separate world records in the 400 metre breaststroke event in 1920, 1921, 1923, 1925 and 1926. In the 200 metre breaststroke event, he set world records in 1922 and 1927. In the 200 yards breaststroke, he set a world record in 1924, and in 1925, he set world records in the 100 metre and 500 metre breaststroke events. This meant that by 1925, Rademacher held all of the breaststroke world records from 100 to 500 metres.

=== International ventures ===
In 1926, Rademacher toured the United States, where he set 10 records in 11 days, and then in 1927 toured Japan as an exhibition swimmer.

By the end of his career, Rademacher had represented Germany in 42 international water polo matches, and had 1,012 first place finishes.

== Flying breaststroke technique ==
Rademacher is considered one of the first people to use the overarm recovery for breaststroke, which was named the "flying fish", and would later be used for the arms part of the butterfly stroke.

== Later life ==
During World War II he was conscripted by the Heer and fought for Germany’s Wehrmacht against the Soviet Union, was captured, and remained in a prison camp until 1947. During that period he suffered a permanent face injury and did not like to be photographed afterwards. After returning to Germany he shied away from swimming circles, and elected not to help set up a new swim association with his teammates from Hellas Magdeburg. Instead, he worked as an insurance clerk in Braunschweig and then in Stuttgart.

Rademacher was inducted into the International Swimming Hall of Fame in 1972, and into the Germany's Sports Hall of Fame in 2008. A street and an indoor swimming pool in Magdeburg are named after him.

== Family ==
His younger brother Joachim was his teammate in both water polo tournaments.

His son Ulrich Rademacher won 11 German swimming titles in 1954–58 and set 37 national records, and his second son Peter Rademacher played for the German water polo team.

== Death ==
Erich Rademacher died on 2 April 1979 in Stuttgart, West Germany, at the age of 77.

== See also ==
- Germany men's Olympic water polo team records and statistics
- List of Olympic medalists in swimming (men)
- List of Olympic medalists in water polo (men)
- List of Olympic champions in men's water polo
- List of men's Olympic water polo tournament goalkeepers
- List of members of the International Swimming Hall of Fame
