= Josef Staudinger =

Austrian diver

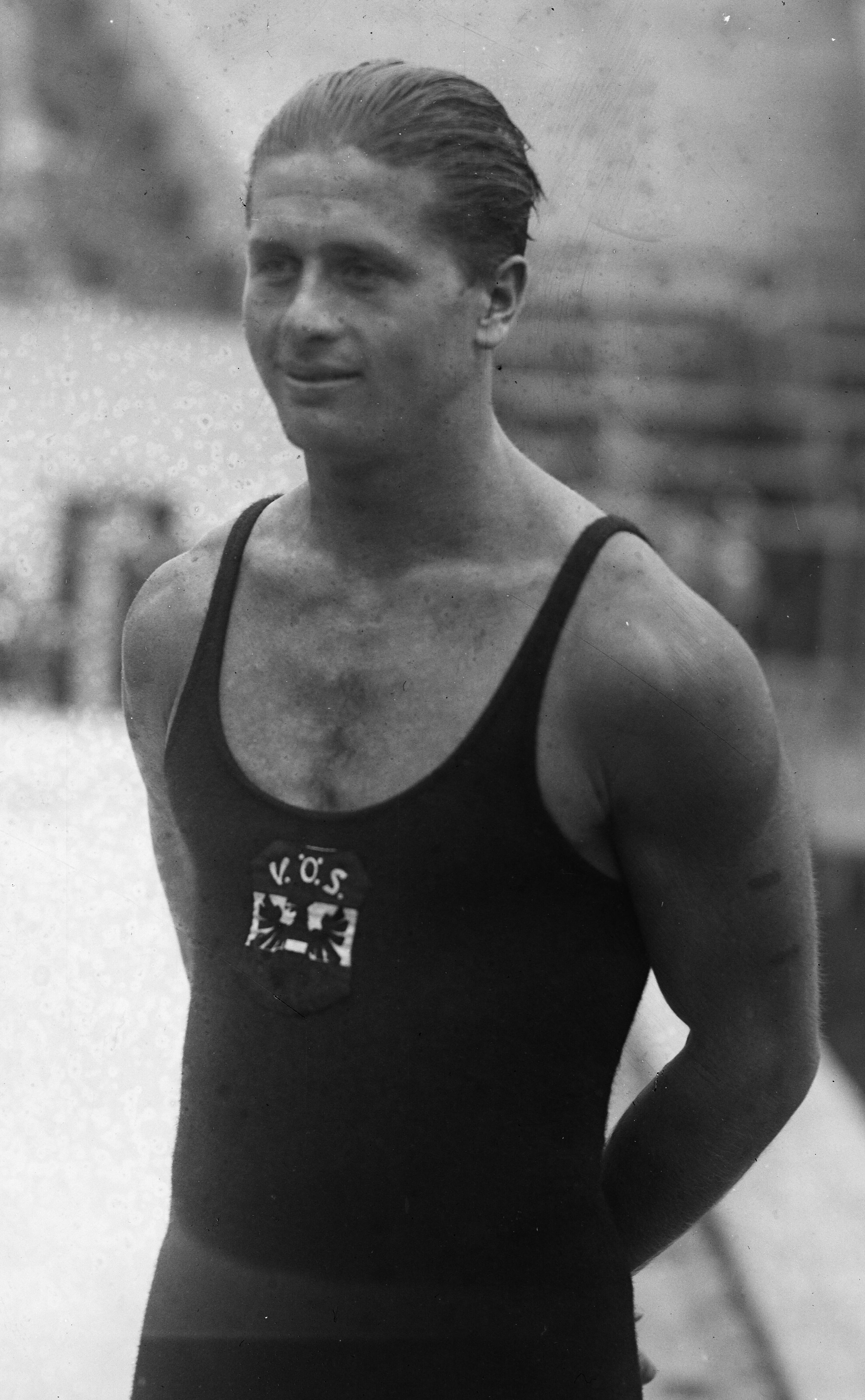
- Josef Staudinger in 1931

Personal information
- Born: 2 November 1906 Vienna, Austria
- Died: 3 April 1998 (aged 91) Vienna, Austria

Sport
- Sport: Diving
Medal record
Representing Austria
European Championships
Gold medal – first place	1931 Paris	Platform

Josef Staudinger (2 November 1906 – 3 April 1998) was an Austrian diver who competed in the 1928 Summer Olympics and in the 1932 Summer Olympics. He was born in Vienna and was the husband of Magdalena Epply. In 1928 he was eliminated in the first round of the 3 metre springboard event as well as of the 10 metre platform competition. Four years later he finished fourth in the 1932 10 metre platform event and ninth in the 1932 3 metre springboard contest.
