= Amílcar =

Amílcar is a Spanish and Portuguese male given name derived from Latin Hamilcar, itself a Punic name known to the Romans through their Carthaginian foes, especially Hamilcar Barca.

Notable people with the name Amílcar include:

- Amílcar Álvarez, Argentine swimmer
- Amílcar Barbuy, Brazilian footballer
- Amílcar Cabral, Bissau-Guinean/Cape Verdean politician
- Amílcar de Castro, Brazilian sculptor and graphic designer
- Amílcar Fonseca, Portuguese footballer
- Amílcar Henríquez, Panamanian footballer
- Amílcar Méndez Urízar, Guatemalan activist and politician
- Amílcar Romero, Dominican politician
- Amílcar de Sousa, Portuguese medical doctor and writer
- Amílcar Spencer Lopes, Cape Verdean politician
- Amílcar Villafuerte Trujillo, Mexican politician
- Jean Amilcar, the Senegalese foster son of Marie Antoinette
