= Van Voorst =

Van Voorst is a Dutch toponymic surname meaning "from Voorst". Notable people with the surname include:

- Carol van Voorst, American diplomat
- Gerrit van Voorst (1910–1986), Dutch swimmer
- John Van Voorst (1804–1898), English publisher
- Robert E. Van Voorst (born 1952), American theologian and educator

== See also ==
- Van Voorst tot Voorst
