= Aulo Gustafsson =

Swedish swimmer

Personal information
- Born: December 5, 1908 Stockholm, Sweden
- Died: August 19, 1982 (aged 73) Stockholm, Sweden

Sport
- Sport: Swimming
Medal record
Representing Sweden
European Championships
Bronze medal – third place	1927 Bologna	4×200 m freestyle

Aulo Lemuel Gustafsson (5 December 1908 – 19 August 1982) was a Swedish freestyle swimmer who competed in the 1928 Summer Olympics. He was born in and died in Stockholm.

At the 1927 European Aquatics Championships, he took a bronze medal the 4×200 m freestyle relay event along with Åke Borg, Eskil Lundahl, and Arne Borg. In the 1928 Summer Olympics, he was a member of the Swedish team which finished fifth in the 4×200 m freestyle relay event.

Gustafsson represented Stockholms KK.
