= Swimming at the 1928 Summer Olympics – Men's 400 metre freestyle =

Men's 400 metre freestyle at the Games of the IX Olympiad
- Venue: Olympic Sports Park Swim Stadium
- Date: 7 August 1928 (heats); 8 August 1928 (semifinals); 9 August 1928 (final)
- Competitors: 26 from 17 nations
- Winning time: 5:01.6 OR

Medalists
1st place, gold medalist(s)		Alberto Zorrilla	Argentina
2nd place, silver medalist(s)		Boy Charlton	Australia
3rd place, bronze medalist(s)		Arne Borg	Sweden

The men's 400 metre freestyle was a swimming event held as part of the swimming at the 1928 Summer Olympics programme. It was the fifth appearance of the event, which was established in 1908. The competition was held from Tuesday to Thursday, 7 to 9 August 1928.

Twenty-six swimmers from 17 nations competed.

== Records ==
These were the standing world and Olympic records (in minutes) prior to the 1928 Summer Olympics.

World record	4:50.3	(Sweden) Arne Borg	Stockholm (SWE)	11 September 1925
Olympic record	5:04.2	(United States) Johnny Weissmuller	Paris (FRA)	18 July 1924

In the final Alberto Zorrilla bettered the Olympic record to 5:01.6 minutes.

== Results ==
=== Heats ===
Tuesday 7 August 1928: The fastest two in each heat and the fastest third-placed from across the heats advanced.

==== Heat 1 ====
Rank	Swimmer	Nation	Time	Notes
1	Austin Clapp	United States	5:13.4	Q
2	Nobuo Arai	Japan	5:23.4	Q
3	Friedel Berges	Germany	5:27.8	
4	James Thompson	Canada	Unknown	

==== Heat 2 ====
Rank	Swimmer	Nation	Time	Notes
1	Buster Crabbe	United States	5:09.8	Q
2	Hiroshi Yoneyama	Japan	5:17.8	Q
3	Albert Vandeplancke	France	5:20.0	q
4	Géza Szigritz	Hungary	5:41.0	
5	Arthur Watts	Great Britain	Unknown	

==== Heat 3 ====
Rank	Swimmer	Nation	Time	Notes
1	Garnet Ault	Canada	5:18.8	Q
2	Herbert Heinrich	Germany	5:20.0	Q
3	Václav Antoš	Czechoslovakia	5:39.8	
4	Taburan Tamse	Philippines	5:39.8	

==== Heat 4 ====
Rank	Swimmer	Nation	Time	Notes
1	Arne Borg	Sweden	5:09.6	Q
2	Ray Ruddy	United States	5:26.4	Q
3	Walter Handschuhmacher	Germany	5:32.0	
4	Rezső Wanié	Hungary	5:35.2	

==== Heat 5 ====
Rank	Swimmer	Nation	Time	Notes
1	Katsuo Takaishi	Japan	5:22.8	Q
2	Boy Charlton	Australia	5:23.0	Q
3	Paolo Costoli	Italy	Unknown	
4	Adán Gordón	Panama	Unknown	
5	Hernán Téllez	Chile	Unknown	

==== Heat 6 ====
Rank	Swimmer	Nation	Time	Notes
1	Alberto Zorrilla	Argentina	5:19.2	Q
2	Jack Hatfield	Great Britain	5:32.8	Q
3	David Lindsay	New Zealand	5:38.6	
4	Billy Broderick	Ireland	Unknown	

=== Semifinals ===
Wednesday 8 August 1928: The fastest three in each semi-final advanced to the final.

==== Semifinal 1 ====
Rank	Swimmer	Nation	Time	Notes
1	Alberto Zorrilla	Argentina	5:11.4	Q
2	Boy Charlton	Australia	5:13.6	Q
3	Ray Ruddy	United States	5:20.6	Q
4	Garnet Ault	Canada	Unknown	
5	Hiroshi Yoneyama	Japan	Unknown	
—	Jack Hatfield	Great Britain	DNS	
—	Nobuo Arai	Japan	DNS	

==== Semifinal 2 ====
Rank	Swimmer	Nation	Time	Notes
1	Arne Borg	Sweden	5:05.4	Q
2	Buster Crabbe	United States	5:06.2	Q
3	Austin Clapp	United States	5:06.8	Q
4	Katsuo Takaishi	Japan	Unknown	
5	Herbert Heinrich	Germany	Unknown	
6	Albert Vandeplancke	France	Unknown	

=== Final ===
Friday 10 August 1928:

Rank	Swimmer	Nation	Time	Notes
1st place, gold medalist(s)	Alberto Zorrilla	Argentina	5:01.6	OR
2nd place, silver medalist(s)	Boy Charlton	Australia	5:03.6	
3rd place, bronze medalist(s)	Arne Borg	Sweden	5:04.6	
4	Buster Crabbe	United States	5:05.4	
5	Austin Clapp	United States	5:16.0	
6	Ray Ruddy	United States	5:25.0	
