= Conelli =

Conelli is an Italian surname. Notable people with the surname include:

- Antonio Conelli (1909–2003), Italian swimmer
- Caberto Conelli (1889–1974), Italian racing driver
- Vicente Conelli (born 2003), Chilean professional footballer

== See also ==
- Canelli
- Connelli
