= Faelo Zúñiga =

Chilean swimmer

Personal information
- Full name: Faelo Zúñiga
- Born: 16 June 1909 Santiago, Chile

Sport
- Sport: Swimming

Faelo Zúñiga (born 16 June 1909, date of death unknown) was a Chilean swimmer. He competed in the men's 100 metre freestyle event at the 1928 Summer Olympics.
