= Ramón Artigas =

Spanish swimmer (1908–1995)

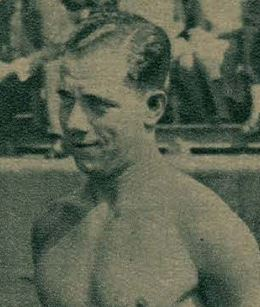

Personal information
- Born: 1 March 1908 Barcelona, Spain
- Died: 4 January 1995 (aged 86) Caracas, Venezuela

Sport
- Sport: Swimming

Ramón Artigas (1 March 1908 – 4 January 1995) was a Spanish swimmer. He competed in the men's 4 × 200 metre freestyle relay event at the 1928 Summer Olympics.
