= Karl Wittenberg =

German swimmer

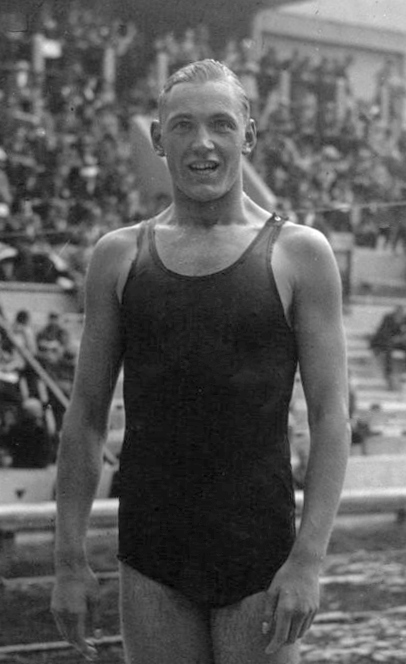
- Karl Wittenberg at the 1931 European Championships

Sport
- Sport: Swimming
- Club: Poseidon Berlin
Medal record
Representing Germany
European Championships
Silver medal – second place	1931 Paris	200 m breaststroke

Karl Wittenberg was a German swimmer who specialized in the 200 m breaststroke. In this event he won the national title and a silver medal at the European Championships in 1931.
