= Władysław Kuncewicz =

Polish swimmer

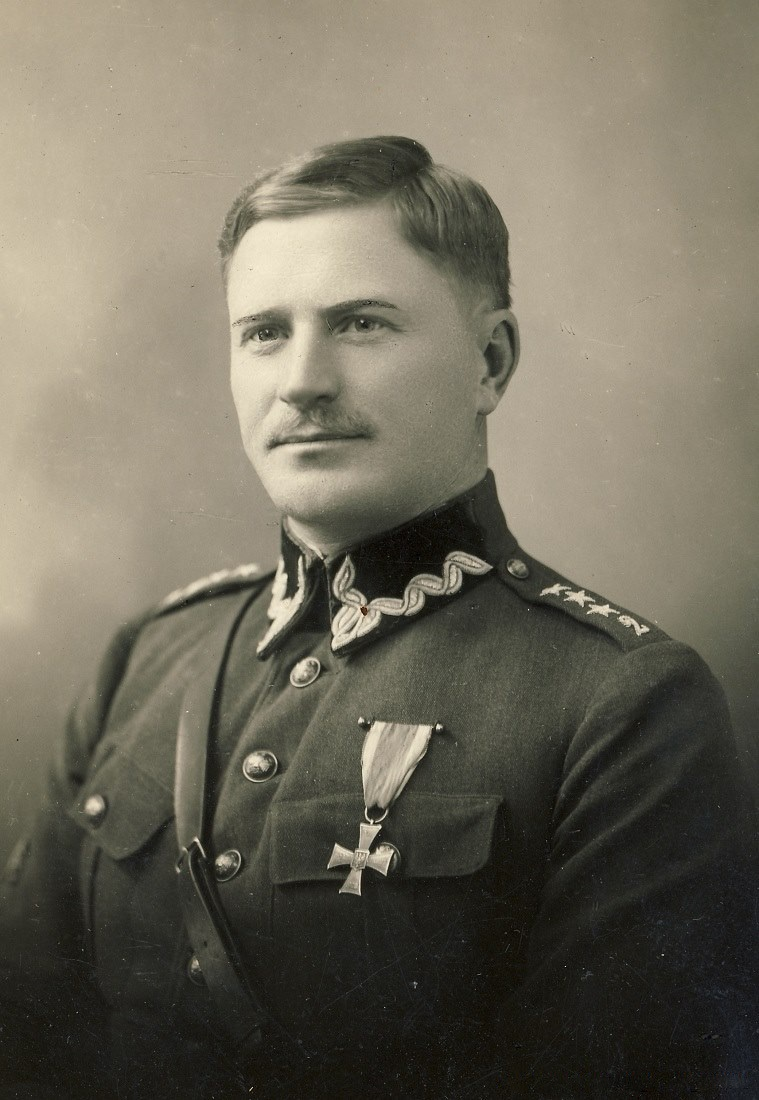
- Władysław Kuncewicz in 1928

Personal information
- Born: 23 October 1888 Kazan, Russian Empire

Sport
- Sport: Swimming

Władysław Kuncewicz (born 23 October 1888) was a Polish swimmer. He competed in the men's 100 metre freestyle event at the 1928 Summer Olympics.
