= Hernán Schüler =

Chilean swimmer

Personal information
- Full name: Hernán Schüler
- Born: 5 March 1909
- Died: 9 June 1994 (aged 85)

Sport
- Sport: Swimming

Hernán Schüler (5 March 1909 – 9 June 1994) was a Chilean swimmer. He competed in the men's 100 metre freestyle event at the 1928 Summer Olympics.
