= Gerhard Deutsch =

German swimmer

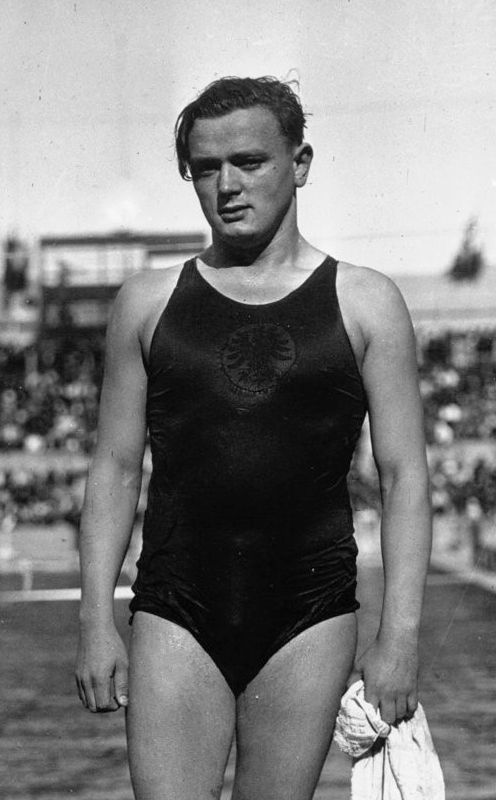
- Gerhard Deutsch at the 1931 European Championships

Sport
- Sport: Swimming
- Club: Borsil Breslau
Medal record
Representing Germany
European Championships
Gold medal – first place	1931 Paris	100 m backstroke

Gerhard Deutsch was a German swimmer. In 1931 he won the 100 m backstroke event at the national and European championships.
