= Joachim Rademacher =

German water polo player

Personal information
- Born: June 20, 1906 Magdeburg, German Empire
- Died: October 21, 1970 (aged 64) Dortmund, West Germany

Sport
- Sport: Swimming, water polo
Medal record
Representing Germany
Men's water polo
Olympic Games
Gold medal – first place	1928 Amsterdam	Team competition
Silver medal – second place	1932 Los Angeles	Team competition
Men's swimming
European Championships (LC)
Gold medal – first place	1926 Budapest	4×200 m freestyle
Gold medal – first place	1927 Bologna	4×200 m freestyle
Bronze medal – third place	1926 Budapest	1500 m freestyle
Bronze medal – third place	1927 Bologna	1500 m freestyle

Joachim ("Aki") Rademacher (20 June 1906 – 21 October 1970) was a German water polo player who competed in the 1928 Summer Olympics and in the 1932 Summer Olympics. He was born in Magdeburg.

In 1928 he was part of the German team which won the gold medal. He played all three matches and scored two goals. Four years later he won the silver medal with the German team. He played all four matches. His older brother Erich was his teammate in both tournaments.

He also competed in swimming, winning the bronze medal in the men's 1500 m freestyle at the first European Championships in 1926, and the gold in the men's 4×200 m freestyle relay event.

== See also ==
- Germany men's Olympic water polo team records and statistics
- List of Olympic champions in men's water polo
- List of Olympic medalists in water polo (men)
