= Takaji Takebayashi =

Japanese swimmer

Personal information
- Born: 8 August 1909
- Died: 1995 (aged 85–86)

Sport
- Sport: Swimming

Takaji Takebayashi (竹林 隆二, Takebayashi Takaji; 8 August 1909 – 1995) was a Japanese swimmer. He competed in the men's 1500 metre freestyle event at the 1928 Summer Olympics and the water polo tournament at the 1932 Summer Olympics.
