= Billy Broderick =

Irish swimmer

Personal information
- Full name: William Denis Broderick
- Nationality: Irish
- Born: 19 May 1908
- Died: 4 April 1946 (aged 37)

Sport
- Sport: Swimming

William Denis Broderick (19 May 1908 – 4 April 1946) was an Irish swimmer. He competed in the men's 400 metre freestyle event at the 1928 Summer Olympics.
