= Ewald Riebschläger =

German diver (1904–1993)

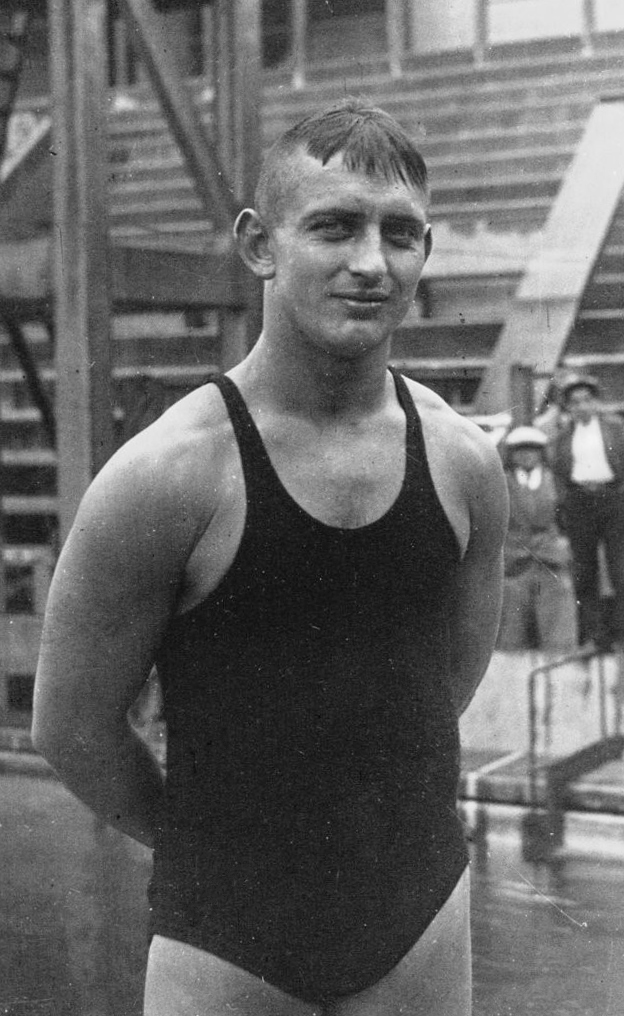
- Ewald Riebschläger at the 1931 European Championships

Personal information
- Born: 24 October 1904 Zeitz, Germany
- Died: 29 October 1993 (aged 89) Zeitz, Germany

Sport
- Sport: Diving
- Club: SV Zeitz
Medal record
Representing Germany
European Championships
Gold medal – first place	1927 Bologna	3 m springboard
Silver medal – second place	1927 Bologna	10 m platform
Gold medal – first place	1931 Paris	3 m springboard
Bronze medal – third place	1931 Paris	10 m platform
Bronze medal – third place	1934 Magdeburg	10 m platform

Ewald Riebschläger (24 October 1904 – 29 October 1993) was a German diver who won two gold, one silver and two bronze medals at the European championships of 1927–1934. He competed at the 1928 Summer Olympics in the 10 m platform and 3 m springboard events and finished in fifth and sixth place, respectively.
