= Yvonne Godard =

French swimmer

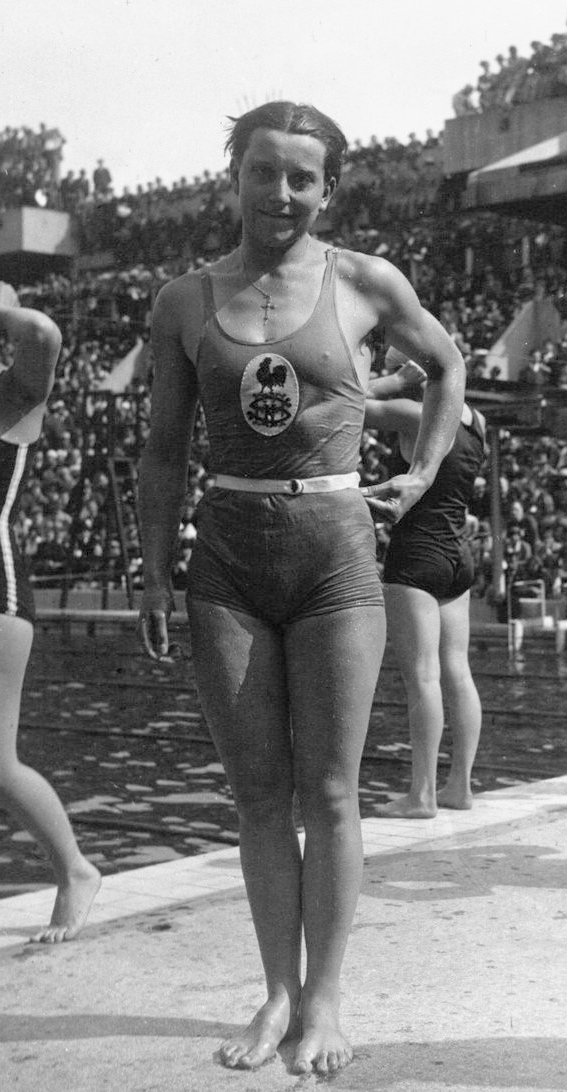
- Yvonne Godard at the 1931 European Championships

Personal information
- Born: 3 March 1908 Douai, France
- Died: 22 September 1975 (aged 67)

Sport
- Sport: Swimming
- Club: CN Paris
Medal record
Representing France
European Championships
Gold medal – first place	1931 Paris	100 m freestyle
Bronze medal – third place	1931 Paris	400 m freestyle

Yvonne Godard (3 March 1908 – 22 September 1975) was a French swimmer who won a gold and a bronze medal at the 1931 European championships in the 100 m and 400 m freestyle. She competed in these events at the 1932 Summer Olympics and finished fifth in the 400 m.
