= Gitta Mallasz =

Hungarian artist

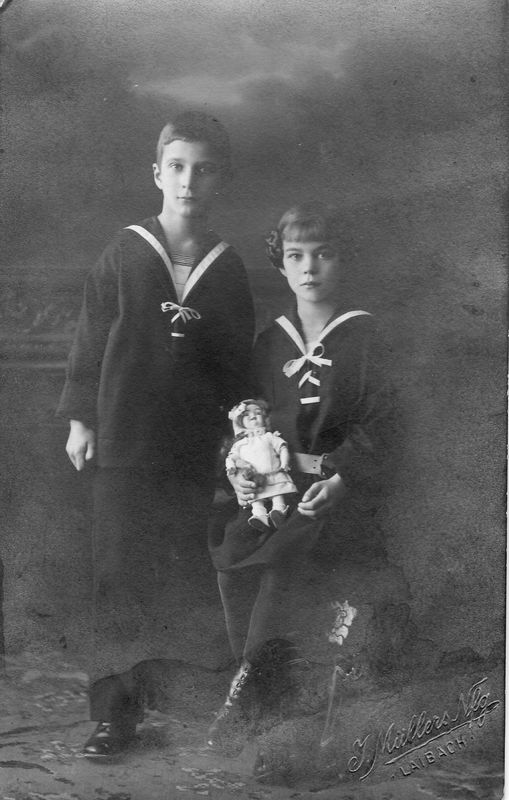
- Ottomár and Gitta Mallász in 1914

Personal information
- Born: 21 June 1907 Ljubljana, Carniola, Austria-Hungary
- Died: 25 May 1992 (aged 84) Tartaras, commune of Ampuis, France

Sport
- Sport: Swimming
Medal record
Representing Hungary
European Championships
Bronze medal – third place	1931 Paris	4×100 m freestyle

Gitta Mallasz (June 21, 1907 – May 25, 1992) was a Hungarian graphic designer and an artist. Today, she is best known for her transcription of a series of extraordinary spiritual instructions, of which she was one of the recipients in Hungary during World War II. In English, the book is called Talking with Angels.

== Life ==
Margit Eugenia (Gitta) Mallasz was born in 1907 in Ljubljana (Laibach) into an Austro-Hungarian family. Her father was an officer in the Hungarian army, her mother was Austrian. In her adolescence in Hungary she became friends with Hanna Dallos at the Academy of Graphic Arts. She was a talented swimmer and in the early thirties, became a national free style and backstroke champion. She won the bronze medal of the 4 × 100 m freestyle relay at the 1931 European Aquatics Championships in Paris. She also made the acquaintance of Lili Strausz, a professor of calisthenics who was also a massage therapist. Soon Gitta Mallasz resumed working in graphic art and joined Hanna Dallos in the atelier which she ran with her husband Joseph Kreutzer. Once antisemitism gained political power in Budapest, the aristocratic Gitta Mallasz took over the commercial management of the atelier from Hanna and Joseph, who were Jewish just like Lili Strausz.

This quartet of young people was in search of the meaning of life and the spiritual. Then the Second World War broke out. The atmosphere became oppressive and alarming. Hanna and Joseph rented a small house in the outskirts of Budapest and reduced their activities to the absolute essentials. Gitta Mallasz and Lili Strausz joined them. One day when Gitta shared her thoughts with her, Hanna Dallos revealed that it wasn't her any more who was speaking. The 25 June 1943, was the beginning of Talking with Angels, seventeen months of spiritual instructions received and transmitted by Hanna, which ended up in an old college building transformed into a workshop for manufacturing military uniforms. The clandestine purpose was trying to save a hundred Jews. Gitta Mallasz accepted the management of it in order to save her friends. But, in 1944, the Nazi vice tightened. Joseph Kreutzer was deported on 3 June, Hanna and Lili were taken to Ravensbrück on 2 December. They never returned; Gitta Mallasz found herself alone in possession of a few black covered notebooks containing the transcripts of the instructions.

In Hungary, after the Nazi terror came the Soviet oppression. Gitta became dress and stage designer and spokesperson for the State Folk Assembly of Rábai Miklós. In those years, in spite of her professional success, Gitta said that she felt like a living dead. In 1960, she "chose freedom" and settled in France. She restarted her career as a graphic designer. To save her family from persecution, she contracted a marriage of convenience with Laci Walder which later turned into a love-match. He was a Jewish communist, veteran of the International Brigade. With her husband, Helen Boyer, and several friends she set herself the task to translate the notebooks into French. The publication was delayed. Eventually, the writer Claude Mettra, producer at the French public radio station France Culture interviewed Gitta Mallasz about her spiritual adventure in his weekly program on March 22, 1976. The impact was enormous. Shortly thereafter, the text was published by Aubier and became an overnight bestseller.

Gitta Mallasz flatly refused to become a guru despite public pressure. But an invitation to a conference of the Zurich C. G. Jung Institute in June 1983 was an important turning point. From then on Gitta Mallasz dedicated the rest of her life to commenting on Talking with Angels, and guarding against false interpretations be it in conferences or in books. In 1988, in a severe accident she broke both her wrists. She gave up her little house in Périgord and moved to live in Tartaras (Ampuis) in the vineyard region of the Côte-Rôtie in the vicinity of her close friends Bernard and Patricia Montaud. From 1985 onwards, Bernard Montaud had been organizing her conferences. She spent her last years there peacefully, writing her last books and releasing the angel's teachings.

She died on May 25, 1992, in Tartaras, in the commune of Ampuis (France). Her ashes were dispersed over the Rhône.

== Talking with Angels ==
The dialogues in Hungarian were transcribed onto notebooks during a series of 88 events, from June 25, 1943, to November 23, 1944.

They have been published altogether in 21 languages.

The first edition was in French, Dialogues avec l'ange, published in 1976.

It was first published in English in a short edition in 1979 by Watkins Publishing, followed by a complete edition by Daimon Verlag in 1988 under the title Talking with Angels.

Only in 1989 was it published in Hungarian.

== Awards ==
Gitta Mallasz was recognized Righteous among the Nations in June 2011 for having saved a hundred Jewish women and children in Budapest in 1944.

== Books ==
=== In French ===
- Mallasz, Gitta (1984). Les Dialogues tels que je les ai vécus [The Dialogues as I lived them]. Paris: Aubier. ISBN 2-7007-0378-2.
- Mallasz, Gitta (1986). Les Dialogues, ou l'enfant né sans parents [The Dialogues, or the child born without parents]. Paris: Aubier. ISBN 2-7007-2630-8.
- Mallasz, Gitta (1989). Les Dialogues, ou le saut dans l'inconnu [The Dialogues, or leap into the unknown]. Paris: Aubier. ISBN 2-7007-2816-5.
- Mallasz, Gitta (1991). Petits Dialogues d'hier et d'aujourd'hui [Short Dialogues yesterday and today]. Paris: Aubier. ISBN 2-7007-2841-6.

=== In German ===
- Mallasz, Gitta (1983). Die Engel erlebt [The angels experienced]. Switzerland: Daimon Verlag. ISBN 978-3-85630-614-4.
- Mallasz, Gitta (1986). Weltenmorgen [Dawning world]. Switzerland: Daimon Verlag. ISBN 978-3-85630-025-8.
- Mallasz, Gitta (1990). Sprung ins Unbekannte [Leap into the unknown]. Switzerland: Daimon Verlag. ISBN 978-3-85630-717-2.

These books stem from correspondence following her public speaking engagements.
