= Ray Ruddy =

American swimmer (1911–1938)

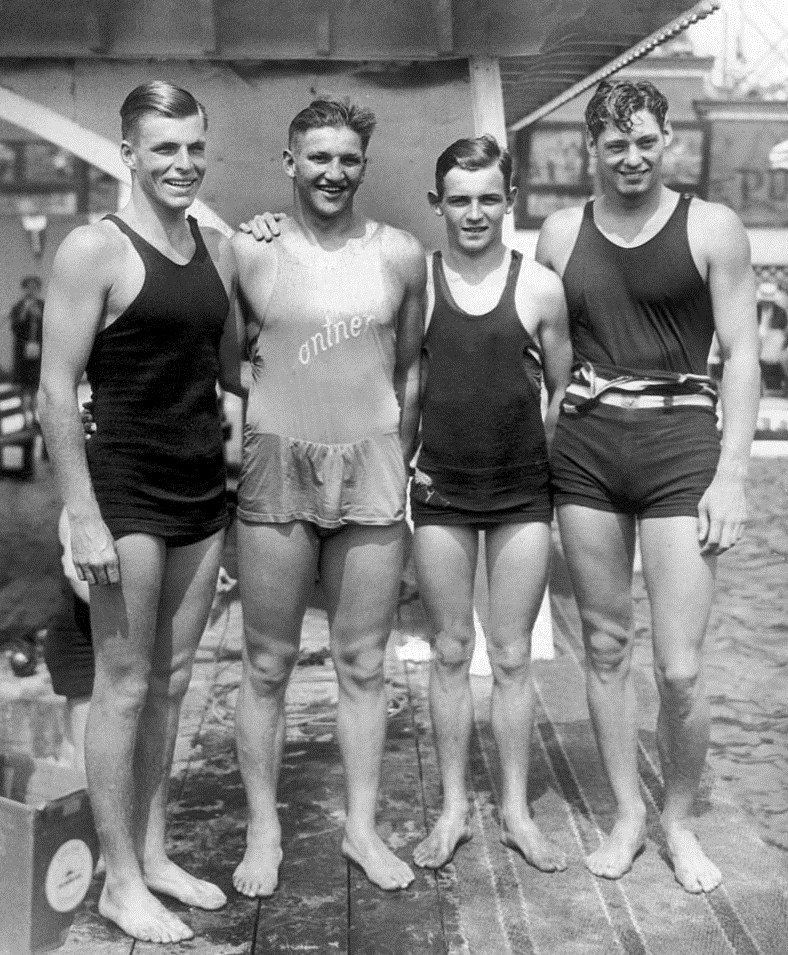
- Buster Crabbe, George Kojac, Ray Ruddy and Johnny Weissmuller in 1928

Personal information
- Full name: Raymond Maurice Ruddy
- Nickname: "Ray"
- National team: United States
- Born: August 31, 1911 New York City, New York, U.S.
- Died: December 4, 1938 (aged 27) New York City, New York, U.S.

Sport
- Sport: Swimming
- Strokes: Freestyle, water polo
- Club: New York Athletic Club
- College team: Columbia University

Raymond Maurice Ruddy (August 31, 1911 – December 4, 1938) was an American competition swimmer who represented the United States as a 16-year-old at the 1928 Summer Olympics in Amsterdam, Netherlands. He competed in the men's 400-meter freestyle, and placed sixth in event final with a time of 5:25.0. He also finished fourth overall in the men's 1,500-meter freestyle in a time of 21:05.0.

Ruddy was born in New York City, the son of 1904 Olympic swimmer Joe Ruddy. He attended Columbia University in New York, where he was a member of the Columbia Lions swimming and diving team in National Collegiate Athletic Association (NCAA) competition. He won the 1930 NCAA national championships in the 440-yard freestyle with a time of 4:55.6.

At the 1936 Summer Olympics in Berlin, Germany, he was a member of the ninth-place U.S. water polo team.

Ruddy died as a result of brain injuries sustained in an accidental fall in 1938; he was 27 years old.

In 1977, he was inducted into the USA Water Polo Hall of Fame.

== See also ==
- List of Columbia University alumni
