= David Young (American swimmer) =

American swimmer (1907–1988)

David King Young III
Personal information
- Full name: David King Young III
- National team: United States
- Born: April 20, 1907 Atlanta, Georgia, U.S.
- Died: January 16, 1988 (aged 80) San Antonio, Texas, U.S.

Sport
- Sport: Swimming
- Strokes: Backstroke, freestyle
- Club: New York Athletic Club
- College team: Georgia Institute of Technology

David K. Young (April 20, 1907 – January 16, 1988) was an American competition swimmer who represented the United States at the 1928 Summer Olympics in Amsterdam, Netherlands. Young swam for the gold medal-winning U.S. team in the preliminary heats of the men's 4×200-meter freestyle relay. Under the Olympic swimming rules in force in 1928, however, he was not eligible to receive a medal because he did not compete in the relay event final.

Young was born in Atlanta, Georgia. He attended the Georgia Institute of Technology, where he competed for the Georgia Tech Yellow Jackets swimming team in National Collegiate Athletic Association (NCAA) competition. In 1927, he won the NCAA national championship in the 150-yard backstroke with a time of 1:44.0.

== See also ==
- List of Georgia Institute of Technology alumni
- World record progression 4 × 200 metres freestyle relay
