= Francisco Segalá =

Spanish swimmer

Personal information
- Born: 14 March 1906
- Died: 12 December 1963 (aged 57) Barcelona, Spain

Sport
- Sport: Swimming

Francisco Segalá (14 March 1906 – 12 December 1963) was a Spanish swimmer. He competed in the men's 4 × 200 metre freestyle relay event at the 1928 Summer Olympics.
