= Hiroshi Yoneyama =

Japanese swimmer

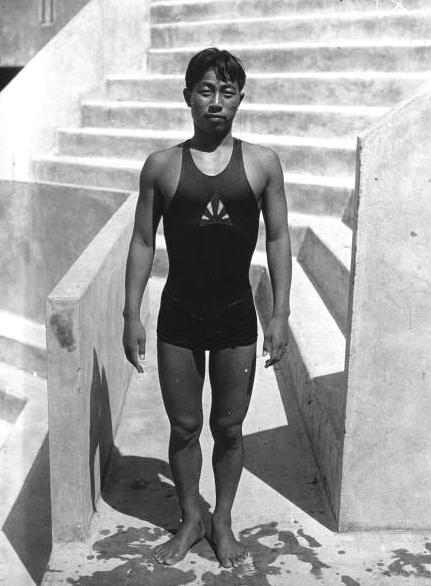
- Hiroshi Yoneyama in 1928

Personal information
- Born: 1908 Ibaraki Prefecture, Japan
- Died: January 24, 1988 (aged 79–80)
Medal record
Olympic Games
Silver medal – second place	1928 Amsterdam	4x200 m freestyle

Hiroshi Yoneyama (米山 弘, Yoneyama Hiroshi; 1908 in Ibaraki – January 24, 1988) was a Japanese swimmer who competed in the 1928 Summer Olympics in Amsterdam.

A graduate of Waseda University, Yoneyama was a member of the Japanese team which won the silver medal for the 4 × 200 meter freestyle relay event at the 1928 Amsterdam Olympics. He also placed fifth in the semifinal of the 400 meter freestyle event, and did not advance.
