= 1926 European Aquatics Championships =

Water sport competitions

1st European Aquatics Championships
- Host city: Budapest
- Country: Hungary
- Events: 9
- Opening: 18 August 1926
- Closing: 22 August 1926

The 1926 LEN European Aquatics Championships took place in Budapest, Hungary between 18 and 26 August 1926. At these inaugural championships, only men were allowed to compete.

== Medal table ==
* Host nation (Hungary)

Rank	Nation	Gold	Silver	Bronze	Total
1	Germany	5	3	4	12
2	Sweden	2	3	3	8
3	Hungary*	2	2	0	4
4	Belgium	0	1	0	1
5	Czechoslovakia	0	0	1	1
5	Great Britain	0	0	1	1
Totals (6 entries)		9	9	9	27

== Medal summary ==
=== Diving ===
Event	Gold		Silver		Bronze	
3 m springboard	Arthur Mund; Germany	186.42	Josef Lechnir; Germany	173.52	Július Balász; Czechoslovakia	164.72
Platform	Hans Luber; Germany	112.84	Helge Öberg; Sweden	107.60	Albert Knight; Great Britain	101.60

=== Swimming ===
Event	Gold		Silver		Bronze	
100 m freestyle	István Bárány; Hungary	1:01.0	Arne Borg; Sweden	1:01.1	Georg Werner; Sweden	1:03.6
400 m freestyle	Arne Borg; Sweden	5:14.2	Herbert Heinrich; Germany	5:21.4	Friedrich Berges; Germany	5:25.6
1500 m freestyle	Arne Borg; Sweden	21:29.2	Friedrich Berges; Germany	22:08.2	Joachim Rademacher; Germany	22:19.8
100 m backstroke	Gustav Fröhlich; Germany	1:16.0	Károly Bartha; Hungary	1:16.0	Eskil Lundahl; Sweden	1:16.1
200 m breaststroke	Erich Rademacher; Germany	2:52.6	Louis Van Parijs; Belgium	2:54.8	Wilhelm Prasse; Germany	3:00.1
4 × 200 m freestyle relay	Germany; August Heitmann; Joachim Rademacher; Friedrich Berger; Herbert Heinrich	9:57.2	Hungary; Zoltan Bitskey; András Wanié; Géza Szigritz; István Bárány	10:03.4	Sweden; Åke Borg; Arne Borg; Eskil Lundahl; Georg Werner	10:06.8

=== Water polo ===
Event	Gold	Silver	Bronze
Men's water polo	Hungary	Sweden	Germany

== See also ==
- List of European Championships records in swimming
