= Nobuo Arai =

Japanese swimmer (1909–1990)

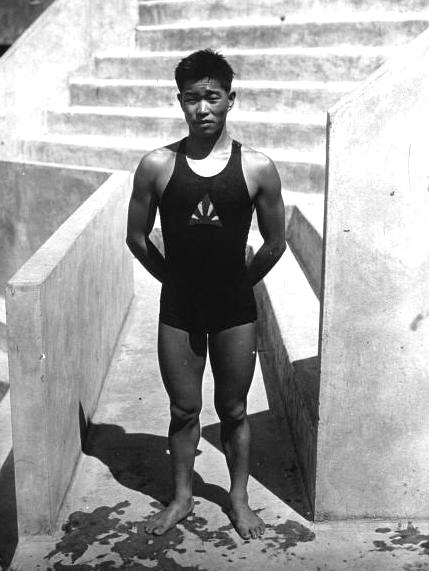

Personal information
- Born: 1909
- Died: June 15, 1990 (aged 80–81)
Medal record
Men's Swimming
Representing Japan
Olympic Games
Silver medal – second place	1928 Amsterdam	4x200 m freestyle

Nobuo Arai (新井 信男) (1909 – June 15, 1990) was a Japanese swimmer who competed at the 1928 Summer Olympics in Amsterdam. Arai was a member of the Japanese team which won the silver medal for the 4 × 200 meter freestyle relay event at the 1928 Amsterdam Olympics. He placed fourth in the semifinal of the 1500 meter freestyle event, but did not advance to the finals. He also qualified for the semifinals of the 400 meter freestyle event, but did not start.
