= Mario Astaburuaga =

Chilean swimmer (1904–1951)

Personal information
- Full name: Mario Astaburuaga
- Born: 4 July 1904 Valparaíso, Chile
- Died: 1951 Santiago, Chile

Sport
- Sport: Swimming

Mario Astaburuaga (4 July 1904 – 1951) was a Chilean swimmer. He competed in the men's 100 metre freestyle event at the 1928 Summer Olympics.
