= Alberto Zorrilla =

Argentine swimmer

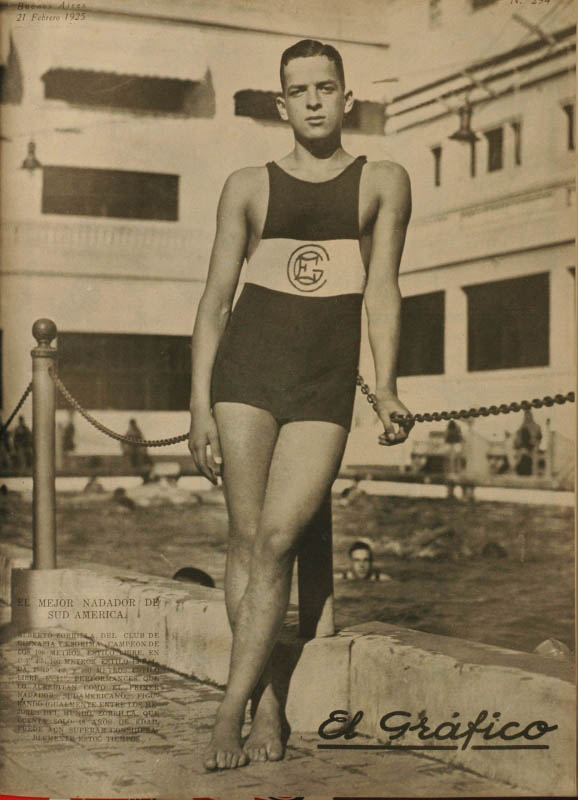

Personal information
- Born: April 6, 1906 Buenos Aires, Argentina
- Died: April 23, 1986 (aged 80) Miami, Florida, United States

Sport
- Sport: Swimming
Medal record
Representing Argentina
Olympic Games
Gold medal – first place	1928 Amsterdam	400 m freestyle

Victoriano Alberto Zorrilla (April 6, 1906 – April 23, 1986) was an Argentine swimmer who competed in the 1924 Summer Olympics and in the 1928 Summer Olympics where he became the first South American to win an Olympic swimming gold medal.

Zorrilla, aged just 18 years old, competed in Paris, France in the 1924 Summer Olympics, he entered in three events, in the 100 metres freestyle he finished 2nd behind Clayton Bourne from Canada in his opening heat so qualified for the semi-finals, in the semi-final he finished sixth nearly seven seconds behind winner Johnny Weissmuller who broke the Olympic record, in his other two events he didn't get past the heats, in the 400 metres freestyle he finished 4th, and in the 4 x 200 metre freestyle relay he again finished 4th in the heat.

Four years later he was competing in the 1928 Summer Olympics held in Amsterdam, Netherlands, he entered four events this time, in the 400 metres freestyle he won both his heat and semi-final, and then in the final he swam a time of 5:01.6 winning the gold medal and breaking the Olympic record which Johnny Weissmuller had set at the previous Olympics, thus also becoming South America's first Olympic swimming gold medalist. He also reached the finals in the 100 metres freestyle where he finished seventh, and the 1500 metres freestyle where he finished fifth, in his final event the 4 x 200 metre freestyle relay they finished last in there heat so didn't qualify for the final. Alberto was the flag bearer for Argentina at the opening ceremony of the 1932 Summer Olympics but missed the competitions due to illness.

He swam for the New York Athletic Club and in 1954 became a U.S citizen.

He married an Icelander, Sonja Wendel Benjamínsson de Zorilla. They became rich, at least partly through Wall Street investments, and later in life lived on Park Avenue, New York.

He died in Miami, Florida two weeks after his 80th birthday. He is buried in Iceland next to his wife Sonja.

== See also ==
- List of members of the International Swimming Hall of Fame
