= Swimming at the 1928 Summer Olympics – Men's 1500 metre freestyle =

Men's 1500 metre freestyle at the Games of the IX Olympiad
- Venue: Olympic Sports Park Swim Stadium
- Date: 4–6 August
- Competitors: 19 from 13 nations

Medalists
1st place, gold medalist(s)		Arne Borg	Sweden
2nd place, silver medalist(s)		Boy Charlton	Australia
3rd place, bronze medalist(s)		Buster Crabbe	United States

The men's 1500 metre freestyle was a swimming event held as part of the swimming at the 1928 Summer Olympics programme. It was the fifth appearance of the event, which was established in 1908. The competition was held from Saturday to Monday, 4 to 6 August 1928.

Nineteen swimmers from 13 nations competed.

== Records ==
These were the standing world and Olympic records (in minutes) prior to the 1928 Summer Olympics.

World record	19:07.2	(Sweden) Arne Borg	Bologna (ITA)	2 September 1927
Olympic record	20:06.6	(Australia) Boy Charlton	Paris (FRA)	15 July 1924

In the final Arne Borg bettered the Olympic record to 19:51.8 minutes.

== Results ==
=== Heats ===
Saturday 4 August 1928: The fastest two in each heat and the fastest third-placed from across the heats advanced.

==== Heat 1 ====
Rank	Swimmer	Nation	Time	Notes
1	Austin Clapp	United States	21:31.0	Q
2	Takaji Takebayashi	Japan	22:30.4	Q
3	James Thompson	Canada	22:56.6	
4	Giovanni Gambi	Italy	Unknown	
5	Jean Taris	France	Unknown	

==== Heat 2 ====
Rank	Swimmer	Nation	Time	Notes
1	Nobuo Arai	Japan	21:35.4	Q
2	Giuseppe Perentin	Italy	21:42.4	Q
3	Dick de Man	Netherlands	23:03.2	
4	David Lindsay	New Zealand	Unknown	

==== Heat 3 ====
Rank	Swimmer	Nation	Time	Notes
1	Katsuo Takaishi	Japan	21:20.8	Q
2	Ray Ruddy	United States	22:12.0	Q
3	Václav Antoš	Czechoslovakia	22:43.0	

==== Heat 4 ====
Rank	Swimmer	Nation	Time	Notes
1	Alberto Zorrilla	Argentina	22:21.2	Q
2	Garnet Ault	Canada	22:55.8	Q

==== Heat 5 ====
Rank	Swimmer	Nation	Time	Notes
1	Arne Borg	Sweden	20:14.2	Q
2	Boy Charlton	Australia	20:17.4	Q
3	Buster Crabbe	United States	20:17.8	q
4	Walter Handschuhmacher	Germany	22:18.6	
5	Taburan Tamse	Philippines	Unknown	

=== Semifinals ===
Sunday 5 August 1928: The fastest three in each semi-final advanced to the final.

==== Semifinal 1 ====
Rank	Swimmer	Nation	Time	Notes
1	Arne Borg	Sweden	20:42.0	Q
2	Alberto Zorrilla	Argentina	21:17.0	Q
3	Garnet Ault	Canada	21:33.4	Q
4	Nobuo Arai	Japan	Unknown	
—	Takaji Takebayashi	Japan	DNF	
—	Austin Clapp	United States	DNS	

==== Semifinal 2 ====
Rank	Swimmer	Nation	Time	Notes
1	Buster Crabbe	United States	20:55.4	Q
2	Boy Charlton	Australia	20:57.0	Q
3	Ray Ruddy	United States	21:31.2	Q
4	Giuseppe Perentin	Italy	Unknown	
—	Katsuo Takaishi	Japan	DNS	

=== Final ===
Monday 6 August 1928:

Rank	Swimmer	Nation	Time	Notes
1st place, gold medalist(s)	Arne Borg	Sweden	19:51.8	OR
2nd place, silver medalist(s)	Boy Charlton	Australia	20:02.6	
3rd place, bronze medalist(s)	Buster Crabbe	United States	20:28.8	
4	Ray Ruddy	United States	21:05.0	
5	Alberto Zorrilla	Argentina	21:23.8	
6	Garnet Ault	Canada	21:46.0	
