= Willy den Turk =

Dutch swimmer

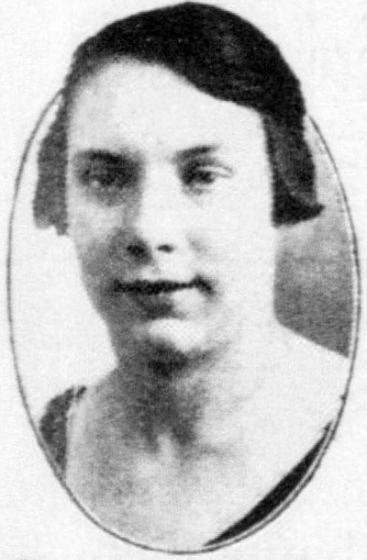

Personal information
- Born: 3 April 1908 Rotterdam, the Netherlands
- Died: 19 June 1937 (aged 29) Rotterdam, the Netherlands

Sport
- Sport: Swimming
- Club: Rotterdamsche Dames Zwemclub
Medal record
Representing the Netherlands
European Championships
| Gold medal – first place | 1927 Bologna | 100 m backstroke |
| Silver medal – second place | 1927 Bologna | 4×100 m freestyle |

Wilhelmina "Willy" den Turk (3 April 1908 – 19 June 1937) was a Dutch swimmer. She won a gold medal in the 100 m backstroke and a silver in the 4×100 m freestyle relay at the 1927 European Aquatics Championships. The same year she set a world record in the 100 m backstroke. This was the first Dutch world record in a backstroke event, and it was bettered by another Dutch swimmer, Marie Braun.

Den Turk was selected for the 100 m backstroke and the 4×100 m medley relay at the 1928 Summer Olympics, but had to withdraw due to a foot injury. She retired shortly thereafter, married Henri Emil Lagerman in 1930, and in 1933 gave birth to a son. She died of a sudden illness, aged 29.
