= Philippe Tisson =

French swimmer

Personal information
- Full name: Philippe Tisson
- Born: 8 March 1903
- Died: 2 January 1990 (aged 86)

Sport
- Sport: Swimming

Philippe Tisson (8 March 1903 – 2 January 1990) was a French freestyle swimmer. He competed in the men's 4 × 200 metre freestyle relay event at the 1928 Summer Olympics.
