= 1927 European Aquatics Championships =

Water sport competitions

2nd European Aquatics Championships
- Host city: Bologna
- Country: Italy
- Events: 16
- Opening: 31 August 1927
- Closing: 4 September 1927

The 1927 LEN European Aquatics Championships were held from 31 August to 4 September in Bologna, Italy. Women's events were held for the first time.

== Medal table ==
=== Overall ===
* Host nation (Italy)

Rank	Nation	Gold	Silver	Bronze	Total
1	Germany	5	5	6	16
2	Sweden	4	2	1	7
3	Netherlands	3	2	0	5
4	Great Britain	2	2	1	5
5	Hungary	1	2	1	4
6	Austria	1	0	2	3
7	France	0	2	0	2
8	Italy*	0	1	2	3
9	Belgium	0	0	2	2
10	Czechoslovakia	0	0	1	1
Totals (10 entries)		16	16	16	48

=== Swimming ===
* Host nation (Italy)

Rank	Nation	Gold	Silver	Bronze	Total
1	Sweden	4	1	0	5
2	Germany	3	3	5	11
3	Netherlands	3	2	0	5
4	Great Britain	1	2	1	4
5	Hungary	0	2	1	3
6	Italy*	0	1	0	1
7	Austria	0	0	2	2
8	Belgium	0	0	1	1
8	Czechoslovakia	0	0	1	1
Totals (9 entries)		11	11	11	33

== Medal summary ==
=== Diving ===
Men's events

Event	Gold		Silver		Bronze	
3 m springboard	Ewald Riebschläger; Germany	7/173.86	Edmund Lindmark; Sweden	16.5/159.86	Luciano Cozzi; Italy	18/160.14
Platform	Hans Luber; Germany	7/114.86	Ewald Riebschläger; Germany	11/111.24	Ezio Selva; Italy	18/100.64

Women's events

Event	Gold		Silver		Bronze	
3 m springboard	Klara Bornett; Austria	5/103.32	Lini Söhnchen; Germany	11/91.96	Hanni Rehborn; Germany	14/86.24
Platform	Isabelle White; Great Britain	5/36.40	Irène Savollon; France	12.5/32.40	Eva Olliwier; Sweden	14/32.20

=== Swimming ===
Men's events

Event	Gold		Silver		Bronze	
100 m freestyle	Arne Borg; Sweden	1:00.0	István Bárány; Hungary	1:03.2	August Heitmann; Germany	1:03.4
400 m freestyle	Arne Borg; Sweden	5:08.6	Herbert Heinrich; Germany	5:15.8	Václav Antoš; Czechoslovakia	5:16.2
1500 m freestyle	Arne Borg; Sweden	19:07.2; WR	Giuseppe Perentin; Italy	21:50.4	Joachim Rademacher; Germany	22:00.0
100 m backstroke	Eskil Lundahl; Sweden	1:17.4	Aladár Bitskey; Hungary	1:17.6	Gustav Fröhlich; Germany	1:17.8
200 m breaststroke	Erich Rademacher; Germany	2:55.2	Wilhelm Prasse; Germany	2:58.0	Louis Van Parijs; Belgium	2:59.8
4 × 200 m freestyle relay	Germany; August Heitmann; Joachim Rademacher; Friedrich Berger; Herbert Heinrich	9:49.6; WR	Sweden; Åke Borg; Aulo Gustafsson; Eskil Lundahl; Arne Borg	9:52.0	Hungary; Géza Szigritz; Rezsö Wanie; András Wanié; István Bárány	10:36.0

Women's events

Event	Gold		Silver		Bronze	
100 m freestyle	Maria Vierdag; Netherlands	1:15.0	Joyce Cooper; Great Britain	1:15.0	Charlotte Lehmann; Germany	1:16.1
400 m freestyle	Marie Braun; Netherlands	6:11.8	Marion Laverty; Great Britain	6:13.6	Fritzi Löwy; Austria	6:21.0
100 m backstroke	Willy den Turk; Netherlands	1:24.6	Marie Braun; Netherlands	1:26.2	Phyllis Harding; Great Britain	1:30.8
200 m breaststroke	Hilde Schrader; Germany	3:20.4	Charlotte Mühe; Germany	3:25.2	Hedy Bienenfeld; Austria	3:27.0
4 × 100 m freestyle relay	Great Britain; Marion Laverty; Valerie Davies; Ellen King; Joyce Cooper	5:11.0	Netherlands; Truus Klapwijk; Willy den Turk; Marie Braun; Maria Vierdag	5:11.6	Germany; Charlotte Lehmann; Anni Rehborn; Marianne Schmidt; Reni Erkens	5:12.8

Legend: WR – World record

=== Water polo ===
Event	Gold	Silver	Bronze
Men's tournament	Hungary	France	Belgium

== See also ==
- List of European Championships records in swimming
