= Charlotte Lehmann =

German swimmer

Personal information
- Born: 3 October 1906 Dresden
- Died: Unknown
Medal record
Women's swimming
Representing Germany
European Championships
Bronze medal – third place	1927 Bologna	100 m freestyle
Bronze medal – third place	1927 Bologna	4×100 m freestyle

Charlotte Lehmann (born 3 October 1906, date of death unknown) was a German freestyle swimmer, born in Dresden, who competed in the 1928 Summer Olympics.

In 1928 she finished fourth with the German relay team in the 4×100 metre freestyle relay competition. In the 100 metre freestyle event she finished sixth. She also participated in the 400 metre freestyle competition but was eliminated in the first round.
