= Hernán Téllez =

Chilean swimmer

Personal information
- Full name: Hernán Téllez Calderón
- Born: c. 1911
- Died: 18 July 1986

Sport
- Sport: Swimming

Hernán Téllez (c. 1911 – 18 July 1986) was a Chilean swimmer. He competed in the men's 400 metre freestyle event at the 1928 Summer Olympics.
