= Tokuhei Sada =

Japanese swimmer (1909–1933)

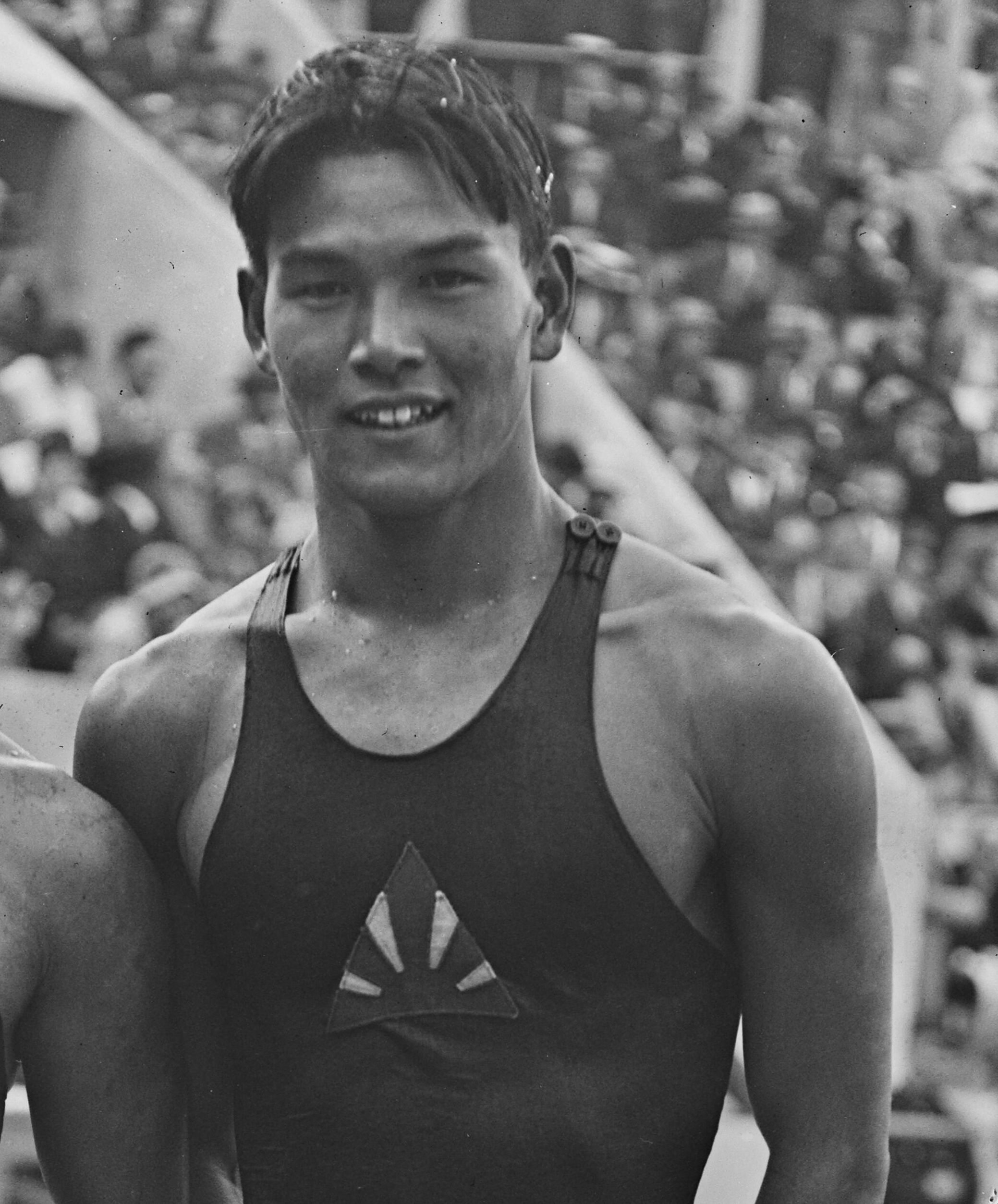

Personal information
- Born: 1909
- Died: December 17, 1933 (aged 23–24)
Medal record
Men's Swimming
Representing Japan
Olympic Games
Silver medal – second place	1928 Amsterdam	4x200 m freestyle

Tokuhei Sada (佐田 徳平, Sada Tokuhei) (1909 – December 17, 1933) was a Japanese swimmer who competed at the 1928 Summer Olympics in Amsterdam.

Born in Yamanashi Prefecture, Sada grew up in Nagoya and was a graduate of Meiji University. Sada was a member of the Japanese team which won the silver medal for the 4 × 200 meter freestyle relay event at the 1928 Amsterdam Olympics. After the Olympics, he went to work for Hankyu, but died due to a disease in 1933.
