= Emilio Vives =

Argentine swimmer

Personal information
- Nationality: Argentine
- Born: 1909

Sport
- Sport: Swimming

Emilio Vives (born 1909, date of death unknown) was an Argentine swimmer. He competed in the men's 4 × 200 metre freestyle relay event at the 1928 Summer Olympics.
