= Estanislao Artal =

Spanish swimmer

Personal information
- Born: 5 September 1912 Barcelona, Spain
- Died: September 1967 (aged 54–55) Barcelona, Spain

Sport
- Sport: Swimming

Estanislao Artal (5 September 1912 – September 1967) was a Spanish swimmer. He competed in the men's 4 × 200 metre freestyle relay event at the 1928 Summer Olympics.
