= Géza Szigritz =

Hungarian swimmer

Personal information
- Full name: Géza Szigritz
- Nickname: Tarródy
- Nationality: Hungary
- Born: 18 January 1907 Krivány, Austria-Hungary
- Died: 12 December 1949 (aged 42) Eger, Heves, Hungary

Sport
- Sport: Swimming
- Strokes: Freestyle
- Club: Magyar Véderő Egylet; Egri Sportegyesület
Medal record
Men's swimming
Representing Hungary
European Championships
Silver medal – second place	1926 Budapest	4×200 m freestyle
Bronze medal – third place	1927 Bologna	4×200 m freestyle

Géza Szigritz (also known as Tarródy, 18 January 1907 – 12 December 1949) was a Hungarian swimmer who competed in the 1928 Summer Olympics.

He was born in Krivány, Detva District and died in Eger.

In the 1928 Summer Olympics, he was a member of the Hungarian team which finished fourth in the 4×200 m freestyle relay event. In the 400 m freestyle competition, he was eliminated in the first round.
