= Antonio Conelli =

Italian swimmer (1909–2003)

Personal information
- Born: September 26, 1909 Lugano, Switzerland
- Died: August 14, 2003 (aged 93) Como, Italy

Sport
- Sport: Swimming
Medal record
Representing Italy
European Championships
Bronze medal – third place	1931 Paris	4×200 m freestyle

Antonio Conelli (26 September 1909 – 14 August 2003) was an Italian freestyle swimmer who competed in the 1928 Summer Olympics.

In 1928 he was eliminated in the semi-finals of the 100 metre freestyle event. He was also a member of the Italian relay team which was eliminated in the first round of the 4×200 metre freestyle relay competition.
