= Dick de Man =

Dutch swimmer

Personal information
- Born: 16 May 1909 Utrecht, Netherlands
- Died: 3 July 1996 (aged 87) Utrecht, Netherlands

Sport
- Sport: Swimming

Dick de Man (16 May 1909 – 3 July 1996) was a Dutch swimmer. He competed in the men's 1500 metre freestyle event at the 1928 Summer Olympics.
