= Leen Buis =

Dutch cyclist

Personal information
- Born: 5 December 1906 Zwanenburg, Netherlands
- Died: 17 November 1986 (aged 79) Amsterdam, Netherlands

Cycling career
- Sport: Cycling

Leendert "Leen" Buis (5 December 1906 – 17 November 1986) was a Dutch road cyclist. He competed in the 1928 Summer Olympics, finishing 17th individually and 9th in the team competition.

== See also ==
- List of Dutch Olympic cyclists
