= Tivadar Filótás =

Hungarian modern pentathlete (1903–1945)

Personal information
- Born: 18 October 1903
- Died: 2 August 1945 (aged 41) Ganghofen, Bayern, Germany

Sport
- Sport: Modern pentathlon

Tivadar Filótás (18 October 1903 – 2 August 1945) was a Hungarian modern pentathlete. He competed at the 1928 Summer Olympics.
