= Piet Bannenberg =

Dutch swimmer

Personal information
- Nationality: Dutch
- Born: 3 January 1911 Amsterdam, Netherlands
- Died: 6 March 2002 (aged 91) Son, Netherlands

Sport
- Sport: Swimming

Piet Bannenberg (3 January 1911 – 6 March 2002) was a Dutch swimmer. He competed in the men's 4 × 200 metre freestyle relay event at the 1928 Summer Olympics.
