= Magdalene Epply-Staudinger =

Austrian diver

Personal information
- Nationality: Austrian
- Born: 22 September 1907 Vienna, Austria-Hungary
- Died: 23 July 2005 (aged 94) Vienna, Austria

Sport
- Sport: Diving
Medal record
Women's diving
Representing Austria
European Championships
Gold medal – first place	1931 Paris	Platform
Silver medal – second place	1931 Paris	3 m springboard

Magdalene Epply-Staudinger (22 September 1907 – 23 July 2005) was an Austrian diver. She competed in two events (10 metre platform & 3 metre springboard) at the 1932 Summer Olympics and the 1936 Summer Olympics.
