= Willem Tholen =

Dutch weightlifter (1900–1984)

Personal information
- Full name: Wilhelmus "Willem" Tholen
- Born: 28 May 1900 Haarlem, the Netherlands
- Died: 21 March 1984 (aged 83) Haarlem the Netherlands

Sport
- Country: Netherlands
- Sport: Weightlifting
- Weight class: Light-Heavyweight
- Club: Krachtsportvereniging Haarlem

Wilhelmus "Willem" Tholen (28 May 1900 – 21 March 1984) was a Dutch male weightlifter, who competed in the Light-Heavyweight category and represented the Netherlands at the Olympic Games.

Tholen won the national competition in October 1926 in Haarlem, ahead of W. v/d Heide from The Hague. Later that month, also at the national competition in Haarlem, he lost to J. Verheien from The Hague. At the national weightlifting championships in June 1927, he won the silver medal, again behind J. Verheien. Two months later, in August 1927, Tholen was officially selected by the national federation to represent the Netherlands at the 1928 Summer Olympics. From October 1927 the Olympic team, including Tholen, trained one evening every other week at De Jonge Bokser in Amsterdam, supervised by A. de Jong. Tholen did some competitions as preparation for the Olympic Games, including on 15 January and 24 January 1928 in Haarlem. And during competitions and demonstrations of the Olympic team in April 1928 in Amsterdam. At the 1928 Summer Olympics he finished 12th.
