= Antal Gáborfi =

Hungarian swimmer

Personal information
- Nationality: Hungarian
- Born: 9 June 1904 Budapest, Austria-Hungary

Sport
- Sport: Swimming

Antal Gáborfi (born 9 June 1904, date of death unknown) was a Hungarian swimmer. He competed in the men's 100 metre freestyle event at the 1928 Summer Olympics.
