= Louis Van Parijs =

Belgian swimmer

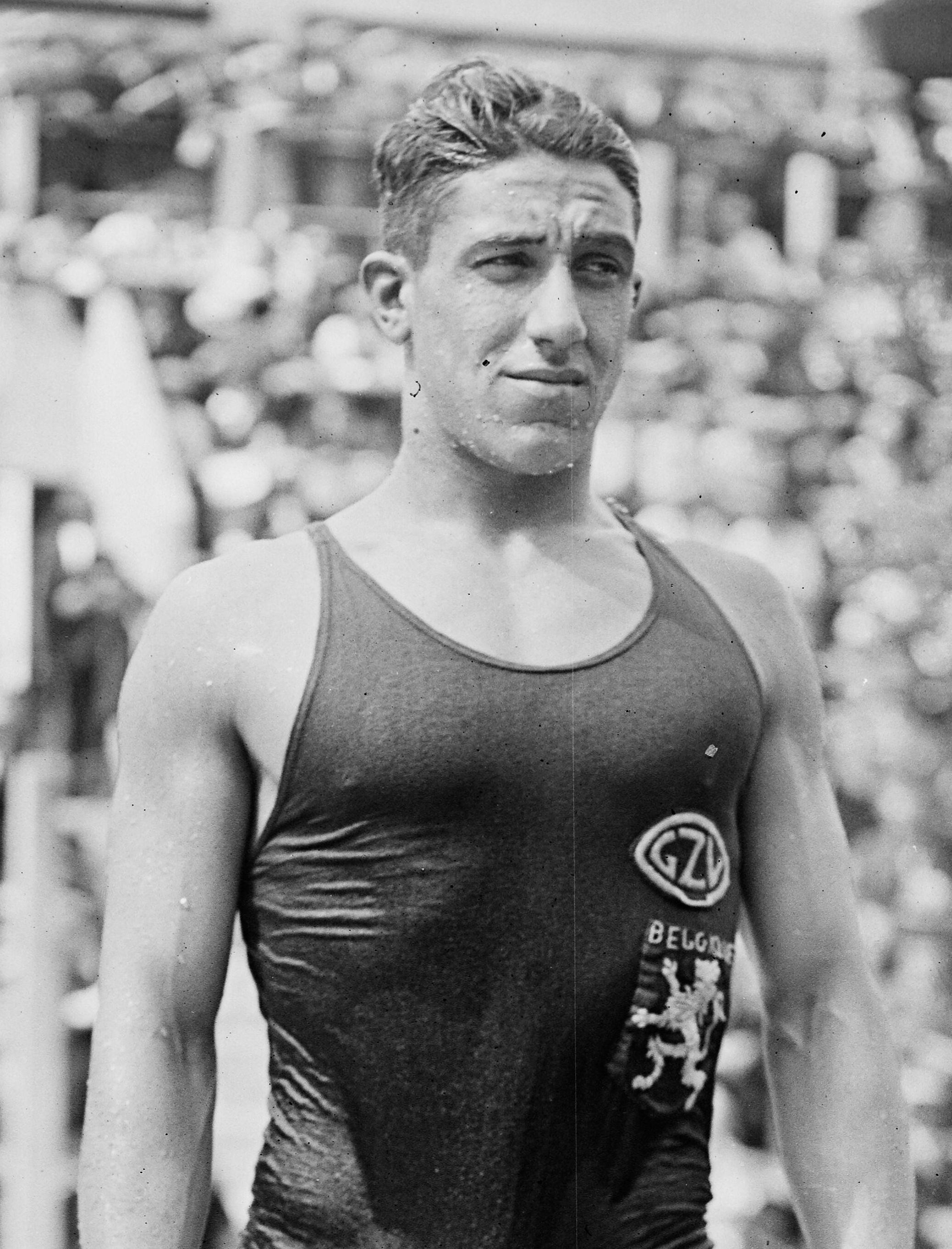
- Image of Louis Van Parys

Personal information
- Born: July 16, 1908 Ghent, Belgium
- Died: September 6, 1998 (aged 90) Ghent, Belgium

Sport
- Sport: Swimming
Medal record
Representing Belgium
European Championships
| Silver medal – second place | 1926 Budapest | 200m breaststroke |
| Bronze medal – third place | 1927 Bologna | 200m breaststroke |

Louis Van Parijs, also spelled Parys (July 16, 1908 – September 6, 1998) was a Belgian swimmer who won two medals in the 200m breaststroke at the 1926 and 1927 European Aquatics Championships. He was the national champion in the same event in 1925–1927, 1930 and 1937, but also competed in freestyle swimming and won the 200m and 400m national titles in 1927. He participated in the 1928 Summer Olympics but did not reach the finals.
