= 1931 European Aquatics Championships =

Water sport competitions

3rd European Aquatics Championships
- Host city: Paris
- Country: France
- Events: 16
- Opening: 23 August 1931
- Closing: 30 August 1931

The 1931 LEN European Aquatics Championships were held from 23 to 30 August in Paris, France.

== Medal table ==
* Host nation (France)

Rank	Nation	Gold	Silver	Bronze	Total
1	Hungary	5	2	2	9
2	Germany	3	4	4	11
3	Netherlands	3	2	0	5
4	Austria	2	1	1	4
5	Great Britain	1	3	3	7
6	France*	1	2	2	5
7	Finland	1	0	0	1
8	Italy	0	1	3	4
9	Sweden	0	1	0	1
10	Czechoslovakia	0	0	1	1
Totals (10 entries)		16	16	16	48

== Medal summary ==
=== Diving ===
Men's events

Event	Gold		Silver		Bronze	
3 m springboard	Ewald Riebschläger; Germany	136.22	Maurice Lepage; France	135.32	Willi Neumann; Germany	134.38
Platform	Josef Staudinger; Austria	111.82	Willi Neumann; Germany	108.90	Ewald Riebschläger; Germany	107.96

Women's events

Event	Gold		Silver		Bronze	
3 m springboard	Olga Jordan; Germany	77.00	Madi Epply; Austria	72.86	? Schlüter; Germany	69.??
Platform	Madi Epply; Austria	34.28	Ingeborg Sjöqvist; Sweden	33.62	R Cretté-Flavier; France	32.94

=== Swimming ===
Men's events

Event	Gold		Silver		Bronze	
100 m freestyle	István Bárány; Hungary	59.8	András Székely; Hungary	1:00.8	Pavel Steiner; Czechoslovakia	1:03.0
400 m freestyle	István Bárány; Hungary	5:04.0	Jean Taris; France	5:04.2	Paolo Costoli; Italy	5:16.8
1500 m freestyle	Olivér Halassy; Hungary	20:49.0	Giuseppe Perentin; Italy	20:50.6	Paolo Costoli; Italy	21:09.4
100 m backstroke	Gerhard Deutsch; Germany	1:14.8	Aladár Bitskey; Hungary	1:15.8	Károly Nagy; Hungary	1:16.2
200 m breaststroke	Ivo Reingoldt; Finland	2:52.2	Karl Wittenberg; Germany	2:54.4	Erwin Sietas; Germany	2:55.0
4 × 200 m freestyle relay	Hungary; András Wanié; László Szabados; András Székely; István Bárány	9:34.0; WR	Germany; Karl Schubert; Raimund Deiters; Hans Balk; Herbert Heinrich	9:48.6	Italy; Antonio Conelli; Sirio Bianchelli; Ettore Baldo; Paolo Costoli	9:49.0

Women's events

Event	Gold		Silver		Bronze	
100 m freestyle	Yvonne Godard; France	1:10.0	Willy den Ouden; Netherlands	1:11.8	Joyce Cooper; Great Britain	1:12.0
400 m freestyle	Marie Braun; Netherlands	5:42.0	Joyce Cooper; Great Britain	5:54.0	Yvonne Godard; France	5:55.4
100 m backstroke	Marie Braun; Netherlands	1:22.8	Joyce Cooper; Great Britain	1:23.6	Phyllis Harding; Great Britain	1:24.8
200 m breaststroke	Cecelia Wolstenholme; Great Britain	3:16.4	Jenny Kastein; Netherlands	3:18.2	Margery Hinton; Great Britain	3:20.4
4 × 100 m freestyle relay	Netherlands; Truus Baumeister; Maria Vierdag; Willy den Ouden; Marie Braun	4:55.0	Great Britain; Valerie Davies; Phyllis Harding; Jean McDowell; Joyce Cooper	5:00.8	Hungary; Margit Mallasz; Ilona Tóth; Margit Sipos; Magda Lenkei	5:02.2

Legend: WR – World record

=== Water polo ===
Event	Gold	Silver	Bronze
Men's tournament	Hungary	Germany	Austria

== See also ==
- List of European Championships records in swimming
