= Rezső Wanié =

Hungarian swimmer

Personal information
- Born: April 12, 1908 Szeged, Austria-Hungary
- Died: April 9, 1986 (aged 77)

Sport
- Sport: Swimming
Medal record
Representing Hungary
European Championships
Bronze medal – third place	1927 Bologna	4×200 m freestyle

Rezső Wanié (12 April 1908 – 9 April 1986) was a Hungarian swimmer who competed in the 1928 Summer Olympics. He was born in Szeged. In the 1928 he was a member of the Hungarian team which finished fourth in the 4 × 200 m freestyle relay event. In the 100 m freestyle competition he was eliminated in the semi-finals and in the 400 m freestyle contest he was eliminated in the first round.
