= Gusztáv Kálniczky =

Hungarian fencer

Personal information
- Born: 17 May 1896
- Died: 1964 (aged 67–68)

Sport
- Sport: Fencing

Gusztáv Kálniczky (17 May 1896 – 1964) was a Hungarian fencer. He competed in the individual and team foil events at the 1928 Summer Olympics.
