= Margit Sipos =

Hungarian swimmer

Personal information
- Born: 12 October 1908 Budapest, Hungary

Sport
- Sport: Swimming
- Club: NTE, Budapest
Medal record
Representing Hungary
European Championships
Bronze medal – third place	1931 Paris	4×100 m freestyle

Margit H. Sipos (born 12 October 1908) was a Hungarian swimmer who won a bronze medal in the 4 × 100 m freestyle relay at the 1931 European Aquatics Championships. She competed in the 100 m freestyle event at the 1928 Summer Olympics, but did not reach the finals.
