= Johannes Brink =

Dutch swimmer

Personal information
- Nationality: Dutch
- Born: 29 April 1912 Amsterdam, Netherlands
- Died: 29 April 1976 (aged 64) Amsterdam, Netherlands

Sport
- Sport: Swimming

Johannes Brink (29 April 1912 – 29 April 1976) was a Dutch swimmer. He competed in the men's 4 × 200 metre freestyle relay event at the 1928 Summer Olympics.
