= Ben Duijker =

Dutch cyclist (1903–1990)

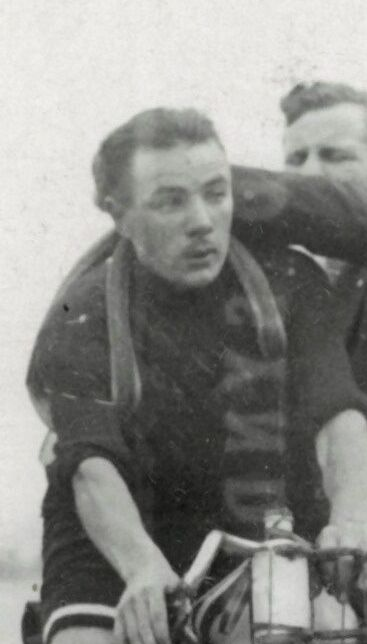

Personal information
- Full name: Bernardus "Ben" Duijker
- Born: 1 August 1903 Amsterdam, Netherlands
- Died: 9 December 1990 (aged 87) Amsterdam, Netherlands

Cycling career
- Sport: Cycling

Bernardus "Ben" Duijker (1 August 1903 – 9 December 1990) was a Dutch cyclist. He competed in the individual and team road race events at the 1928 Summer Olympics.

== See also ==
- List of Dutch Olympic cyclists
