= Eskil Lundahl =

Swedish swimmer and architect

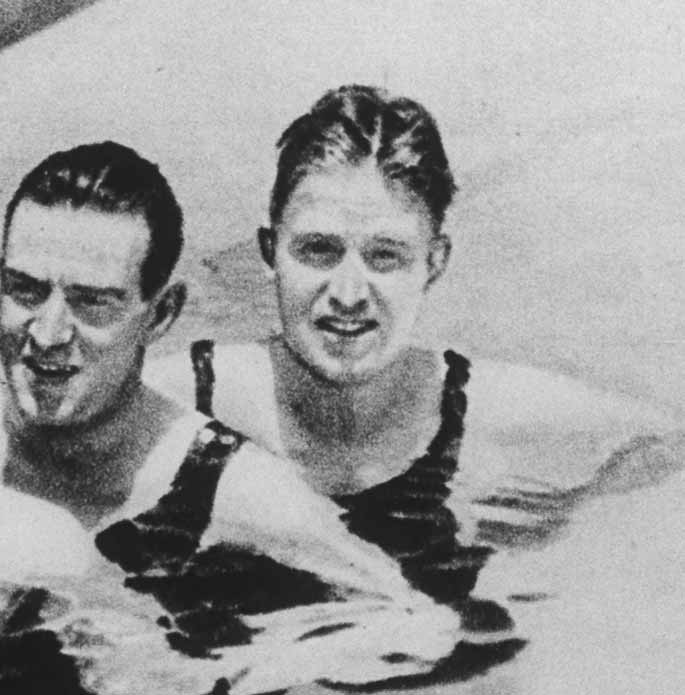
- Lundahl at the 1932 Olympics

Personal information
- Born: 7 September 1905 Malmö, Sweden
- Died: 10 November 1992 (aged 87) Bromma, Stockholm, Sweden

Sport
- Sport: Swimming
- Strokes: Freestyle, backstroke
- Club: SoIK Hellas
Medal record
Representing Sweden
European Championships
Gold medal – first place	1927 Bologna	100 m backstroke
Silver medal – second place	1927 Bologna	4×200 m freestyle
Bronze medal – third place	1926 Budapest	100 m backstroke
Bronze medal – third place	1926 Budapest	4×200 m freestyle

Eskil Johannes Lundahl (7 September 1905 – 10 November 1992) was a Swedish swimmer who competed in the 1928, 1932 and 1948 Summer Olympics.

In the 1928 he was a member of the Swedish team that finished fifth in the 4×200 m freestyle relay. He was eliminated in a semi-final of the 100 m backstroke and in first round of the 100 m freestyle event. Four years later he was again eliminated in the first round of the 100 m freestyle and 100 m backstroke competitions.

At the 1948 Summer Olympics he participated as an architect in the art competition.
