= Vincenzo Gambi =

19th-century Italian pirate

- Born: Italy
- Died: 1819; Gulf of Mexico
- Piratical career
- Type: pirate, smuggler, naval artillery officer
- Years active: c. 1805-1819
- Rank: Captain
- Base of operations: New Orleans; Galveston
- Commands: Petit Milan; Philanthrope

Vincenzo Gambi (died 1819) was a 19th-century Italian pirate. He was considered one of the most notorious men in the Gulf of Mexico during the early 19th century and raided shipping in the gulf for well over a decade before his death. Gambi was one of several pirates associated with Jean Lafitte and later assisted him during the Battle of New Orleans along with Dominique You, Rene Beluche and another fellow Italian-born pirate Louis "Nez Coupé" Chighizola.

== Biography ==
One of Lafitte's partners, Gambi had a long criminal history that preceded him prior to his arrival in New Orleans during the early 19th century. Within several years, he had become of the major pirates active in the Gulf of Mexico and was claimed to have personally killed dozens of his victims with an axe. He was one of the first men to be approached by Jean Lafitte when he first began to organize the warring factions of the pirates of Grand Terre and the Bay of Barataria. At one of his earliest conferences, Lafitte asked his fellow pirates to sail as privateers with a letter of marque and limit their attacks only to the Spanish. Gambi openly defied him however, refusing to this request outright and left the conference. Soon after, Lafitte received news that Gambi was encouraging his own men to revolt against him. Lafitte was soon confronted by one of Gambi's officers who, challenging him with a pistol, shouted "The men of Gambi take orders only from Gambi!" Lafitte then drew his own pistol and shot the officer, killing him.

Sailing with Lafitte's pirate fleet during the next years, he was later given command of the schooner Petit Milan in May 1813 and captured a Spanish schooner carrying a cargo of dry goods soon after. He took the prize to Cat Island, roughly 15 miles (24 km) west of the mouth of Lafourche, with the profits being split between the Lafitte brothers and the rest of the fleet. He and the others were well known in New Orleans and openly sold captured prizes and cargo, often English manufactured goods, to friends and acquaintances in the city.

He and the others sided, with Lafitte, against the British, during the War of 1812 and was present with Lafitte, Dominique You, Rene Beluche and Louis "Nez Coupé" Chighizola during the Battle of New Orleans. After the war, Gambi was granted American citizenship by President James Madison as were Lafitte and the others who participated in the battle. After Lafitte left Grand Terre for Texas, Gambi settled on Cheniere Caminada, building a large house and raising his family there. The house became a home for Lafitte, Dominique You, Rene Beluche and others.

In 1815, Gambi was enlisted by General Jean Robert Marie Humbert and José Álvarez de Toledo y Dubois in their conspiracy to invade Texas. Despite the United States and Spain being at peace, the US funded his piracy activities against the Spanish. In May, he captured two Spanish ships off the coast of Tampico and brought them back to Grande Isle on June 1. While both ships were carrying cocoa and dry goods, one ship was found with silver ingots. The crew and passengers of the two ships were held captive in what was described by one of the captives as a "most cruel situation" for four weeks before Gambi send them back in one of the prizes.

Spanish agents in New Orleans eventually become aware of the intentions of Humbert and Toledo however, especially after Humbert publicly stated his plans in a newspaper article, and both Toledo and Gambi were arrested by Commodore Daniel Patterson for piracy. Neither of the men were convicted, however.

Gambi was one of the hundred or so Baratarians who followed Lafitte after receiving his pardon from President James Madison. He was going to be given command of the Victoria, however he left almost immediately after due to a falling out between him and the Lafittes when Pierre Lafitte sued him in a civil suit over a $250 loan on July 2, 1817. During the next four years, he engaged in outright piracy, continuing to loot and sink a number of ships before he himself was apparently killed by his own men who found him asleep on a pile of gold. Catching up to Gambi once more, his schooner was captured in December 1819 by Daniel Patterson in what is thought to have been the last pirate ship active in the western Gulf of Mexico. Patterson learned from the crew that they had killed Gambi after learning that he had kept several thousand dollars owed to them they had taken from their latest victim. As he slept on deck during the night, his head resting on a spar, one of his men decapitated him using "the very bloody ax which he so often used", according to news reports published around 1819, including a colorful story by the Opelousas Courier.
