= Amílcar Álvarez =

Argentine swimmer

Amilcar Álvarez
Personal information
- Born: 14 June 1909

Sport
- Sport: Swimming

Amilcar Álvarez (born 14 June 1909, date of death unknown) was an Argentine swimmer. He competed in the men's 4 × 200 metre freestyle relay event at the 1928 Summer Olympics.
