= Gianni Gambi =

Italian swimmer (1907–1986)

Giovanni Gambi
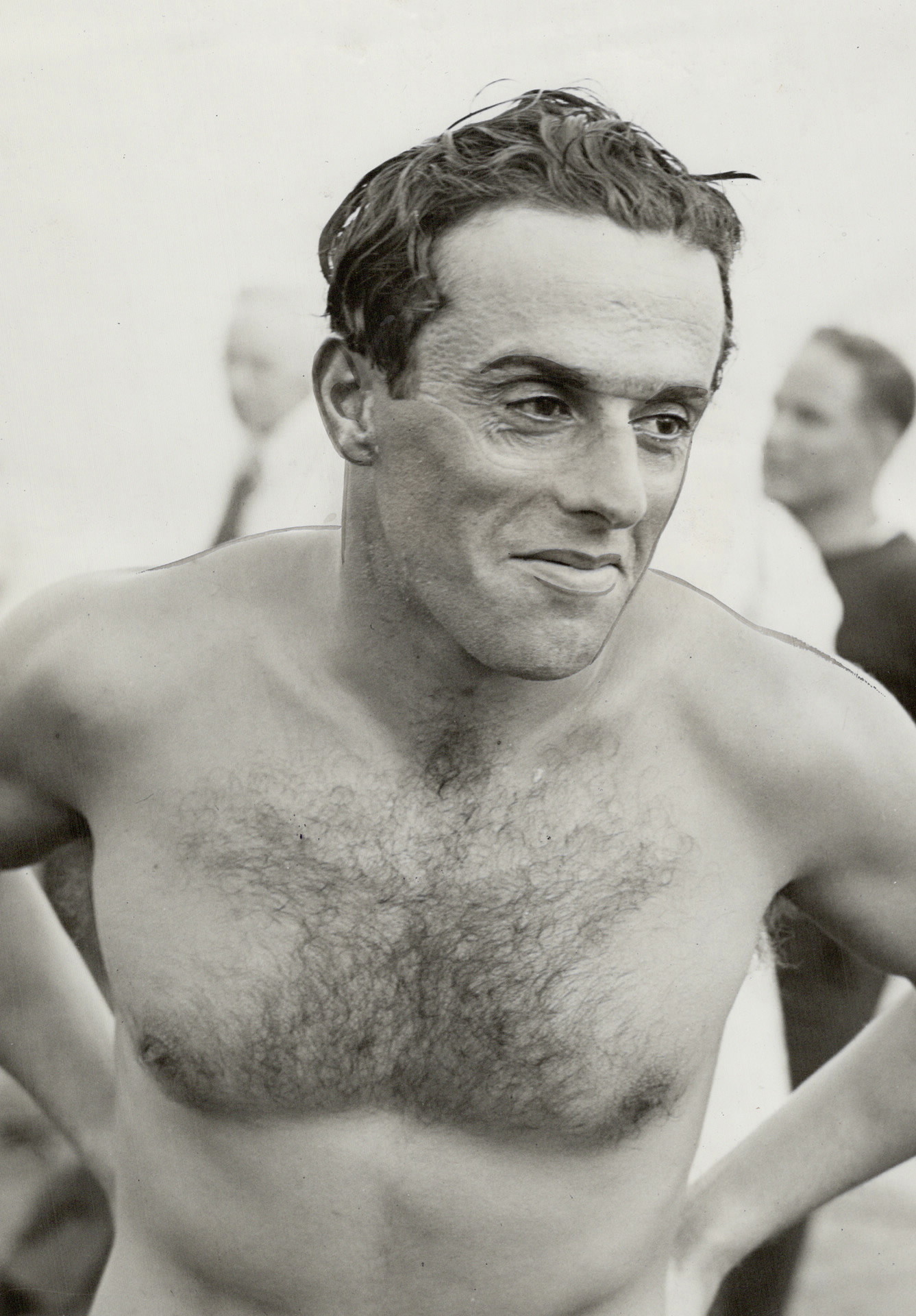
- Gambi in Canada 1937

Personal information
- Born: 6 September 1907 Ravenna, Italy
- Died: 18 May 1986 (aged 78) Ravenna, Italy

Sport
- Sport: Swimming

Gianni Gambi (also Giovanni; 6 September 1907 – 18 May 1986) was an Italian swimmer who competed in the 1500 m freestyle at the 1928 Summer Olympics. After the Olympics he changed to open water swimming, together with his brother Cecco, and in the 1930s competed in Canada and the United States. In 1948 he crossed the English Channel in 12 hours and 40 minutes. Next year he swam 21 miles between Naples and Capri in 15 hours.
