= Karl Schubert (swimmer) =

German swimmer

Personal information
- Born: 20 May 1908 Neisse, Germany (modern-day Nysa, Poland)
- Died: 18 March 1991 (aged 82) Pirmasens, Germany

Sport
- Sport: Swimming
- Club: Borsil Breslau
Medal record
Men's swimming
Representing Germany
European Championships
Silver medal – second place	1931 Paris	4×200 m freestyle

Karl Schubert (20 May 1908 – 18 March 1991) was a German swimmer who won a silver medal at the 1931 European Aquatics Championships. He also competed at the 1928 Summer Olympics but was eliminated in preliminaries.
