= Gerrit van Voorst =

Dutch swimmer

Personal information
- Nationality: Dutch
- Born: 18 July 1910 Amsterdam, Netherlands
- Died: 13 November 1986 (aged 76) Castricum, Netherlands

Sport
- Sport: Swimming

Gerrit van Voorst (18 July 1910 – 13 November 1986) was a Dutch swimmer. He competed in the men's 4 × 200 metre freestyle relay event at the 1928 Summer Olympics.
