= August Heitmann =

German swimmer

Personal information
- Born: 1907 Kalymnos, Greece
- Died: 1971 (aged 63–64) Santiago de Chile, Chile

Sport
- Sport: Swimming
Medal record
Representing Germany
European Championships (LC)
Gold medal – first place	1926 Budapest	4×200 m freestyle
Gold medal – first place	1927 Bologna	4×200 m freestyle
Bronze medal – third place	1927 Bologna	100 m freestyle

August Heitmann (1907 – 1971) was a German swimmer who competed in the 1928 Summer Olympics.
