= Herbert Heinrich =

German swimmer

Personal information
- Born: 27 July 1899 Leipzig, German Empire
- Died: 17 February 1975 (aged 75) Düsseldorf, West Germany

Sport
- Sport: Swimming
Medal record
Representing Germany
European Championships (LC)
Gold medal – first place	1926 Budapest	4×200 m freestyle
Gold medal – first place	1927 Bologna	4×200 m freestyle
Silver medal – second place	1926 Budapest	400 m freestyle
Silver medal – second place	1927 Bologna	400 m freestyle
Silver medal – second place	1931 Paris	4×200 m freestyle

Herbert Heinrich (27 July 1899 – 17 February 1975) was a German swimmer who competed in the 1928 Summer Olympics. Heinrich was considered the preeminent short distance German swimmer of the early 1920s, but because German athletes had been excluded from the Olympic Games in 1920 and 1924, prior to 1928, Heinrich was only able to compete internationally at the European Swimming Championships, first held in 1926 in Budapest.
