= Henk van Essen =

Dutch swimmer

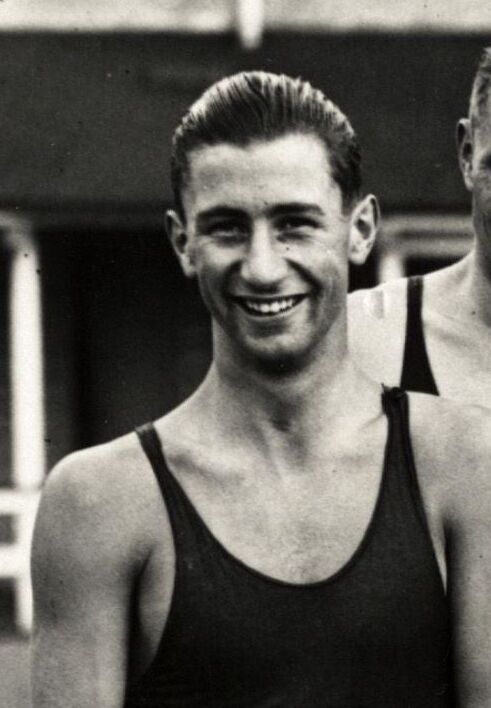
- Henk van Essen in 1927

Personal information
- Born: 5 February 1909 Amsterdam, Netherlands
- Died: 23 December 1968 (aged 59) Kortenhoef, Netherlands

Sport
- Sport: Swimming

Henk van Essen (5 February 1909 – 23 December 1968) was a Dutch freestyle swimmer. He competed in two events at the 1928 Summer Olympics. His last result is the 10th place for the men's 4x200 m freestyle - heat during the Olympic Games 1928.
