= Egypt at the 1928 Summer Olympics =

- IOC code: EGY
- NOC: Egyptian Olympic Committee

in Amsterdam, Netherlands 28 July–12 August 1928
- Competitors: 32 in 5 sports
- Flag bearer: Ibrahim Moustafa
- Medals Ranked 17th: Gold 2 Silver 1 Bronze 1 Total 4

Summer Olympics appearances (overview)
- 1912; 1920; 1924; 1928; 1932; 1936; 1948; 1952; 1956; 1960–1964; 1968; 1972; 1976; 1980; 1984; 1988; 1992; 1996; 2000; 2004; 2008; 2012; 2016; 2020; 2024

Other related appearances
- 1906 Intercalated Games –––– United Arab Republic (1960, 1964)

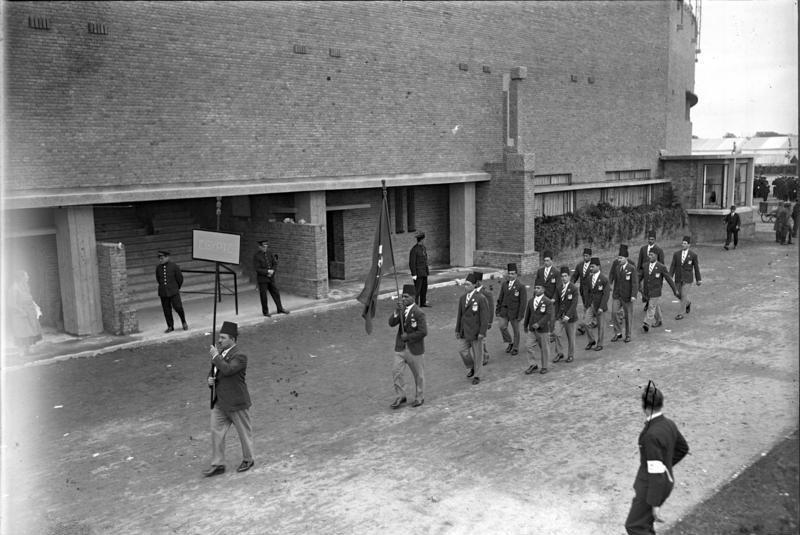
The entry of the Egyptian athletes at the opening of the 1928 Games.

Egypt competed at the 1928 Summer Olympics in Amsterdam, Netherlands. 32 competitors, all men, took part in 15 events in 5 sports.

== Medalists ==
Medal	Name	Sport	Event	Date
Gold	Ibrahim Moustafa	Wrestling	Men's Greco-Roman light heavyweight	August 5
Gold	El Sayed Nosseir	Weightlifting	Men's 82.5 kg	July 29
Silver	Farid Simaika	Diving	Men's 10 m platform	August 9
Bronze	Farid Simaika	Diving	Men's 3 m springboard	August 8

== Aquatics ==
=== Diving ===
Two divers, both men, represented Egypt in 1928. It was the nation's debut appearance in the sport. Farid Simaika competed in both the springboard and platform events, taking bronze in the former and silver in the latter. Simaika originally was announced as the winner of the platform contest, as his average score of 99.58 was the highest. However, the event officials then announced that 4 of the 5 judges had scored American Pete Desjardins higher than Simaika and therefore Desjardins was the winner under the rules in place at the time.

Abdel Moneim Mokhtar competed in the platform, finishing 6th in his semifinal group and not making the top-3 cut necessary to advance to the final.

Diver	Event	Semifinals			Final		
Diver	Event	Points	Score	Rank	Points	Score	Rank
Farid Simaika	Men's 3 metre springboard	10	164.96	2 Q	13	172.46	3rd place, bronze medalist(s)
Abdel Moneim Mokhtar	Men's 10 metre platform	31	59.14	6	Did not advance		
Farid Simaika	Men's 10 metre platform	6	102.38	1 Q	9	99.58	2nd place, silver medalist(s)

== Fencing ==
Eight fencers, all men, represented Egypt in 1928. It was the nation's third appearance in the sport. For the first time, Egyptian fencers advanced to an event final: Cicurel placed 8th and Moyal placed 10th in the men's individual épée.

Fencer	Event	Round 1		Quarterfinals		Semifinals		Final	
Fencer	Event	Result	Rank	Result	Rank	Result	Rank	Result	Rank
Elie Adda	Men's épée	2 wins	8	Did not advance					
Salvator Cicurel	Men's épée	6 wins	1 Q	8 wins	1 Q	5 wins	3 Q	3 wins	8
Saul Moyal	Men's épée	6 wins	3 Q	7 wins	4 Q	4 wins	5 Q	1 win	10
Elie Adda	Men's team épée	1–1	2 Q	1–2	3	Did not advance			
Mohamed Charaoui	Men's team épée	1–1	2 Q	1–2	3	Did not advance			
Salvator Cicurel	Men's team épée	1–1	2 Q	1–2	3	Did not advance			
Joseph Misrahi	Men's team épée	1–1	2 Q	1–2	3	Did not advance			
Saul Moyal	Men's team épée	1–1	2 Q	1–2	3	Did not advance			
Mahmoud Abdin	Men's foil	—N/a		0 wins	6	Did not advance			
Joseph Misrahi	Men's foil	—N/a		3 wins	6	Did not advance			
Saul Moyal	Men's foil	—N/a		4 wins	2 Q	2 wins	6	Did not advance	
Mahmoud Abdin	Men's team foil	0–2	3	Did not advance					
Salvator Cicurel	Men's team foil	0–2	3	Did not advance					
Joseph Misrahi	Men's team foil	0–2	3	Did not advance					
Saul Moyal	Men's team foil	0–2	3	Did not advance					
Abu Bakr Ratib	Men's team foil	0–2	3	Did not advance					
Mohamed Charaoui	Men's sabre	—N/a		Bye		1 win	7	Did not advance	
Hamad Niazi	Men's sabre	—N/a		2 wins	4	Did not advance			

== Football ==

Summary

Team	Event	Prelim.	Round of 16	Quarterfinals	Semifinals	Final / BM	
Team	Event	Opposition Score	Opposition Score	Opposition Score	Opposition Score	Opposition Score	Rank
Egypt men's	Men's tournament	Bye	Turkey; W 7–1	Portugal; W 2–1	Argentina; L 6–0	Italy; L 11–3	4

Men's tournament

Egypt competed in men's football for the 3rd time in 1928. Egypt won its first two matches before falling to Argentina in the semifinals; the team took 4th place after losing the bronze medal game as well. It was the best result in Egypt's Olympic history, improving upon the 5th place finish in 1924.

Team roster

Head coach: Valerian Bezveconnîi, aka "Valer-Bei"?

No.	Pos.	Player	Date of birth (age)	Caps	Club
-	DF	Sayed Abaza			(Egypt) Zamalek
-	DF	Sid Ahmed			(Egypt)
-	FW	Moussa El-Ezam			(Egypt)
-	MF	Ali El-Hassani	1897		(Egypt) Zamalek
-	FW	Ismail El-Sayed Hooda "Ismail I"	1900		(Egypt) Al Ittihad Alexandria Club
-	MF	Gaber El-Soury			(Egypt) Al Ittihad Alexandria Club
-	FW	Gamil El-Zobair			(Egypt) Al Ahly
-	DF	Mohamed Gamal			(Egypt)
-	FW	Mohamed Shemais			(Egypt)
-	GK	Abdel Hamid Hamdi			(Egypt) Zamalek
-	MF	Abdel Halim Hassan			(Egypt) Al-Masry SC
-	MF	Mohamed Hassan			(Egypt)
-	FW	Mahmoud Ismail Hooda "Ismail II"	1899		(Egypt) Al Ittihad Alexandria Club
-	MF	Ahmed Mansour			(Egypt)
-	FW	Mahmoud Mokhtar El-Tetsh	23 December 1907 (aged 20)		(Egypt) Al Ahly
-	FW	Ali Mohamed Riad	1904		(Egypt) Zamalek
-	GK	Mohamed Ali Rostam			(Egypt) El Sekka El Hadid SC
-	DF	Ahmed Salem			(Egypt) Zamalek
-	FW	Mahmoud Salem			(Egypt)
-	MF	Ahmed Soliman			(Egypt) Al Ahly
-	FW	Ahmed Mokhtar			(Egypt) Al Ahly

Round of 16

28 May 1928
19:00

Egypt	7–1	Turkey
El-Hassany 20' (pen.); Riad 27'; Mokhtar 46', 50', 63'; El-Sayed Hooda 53'; El-Zobeir 86'	Report	Refet 71'

Olympic Stadium, Amsterdam
Attendance: 2,744
Referee: Marcel Slawick (FRA)

Quarterfinals

4 June 1928
19:00

Egypt	2–1	Portugal
Mokhtar 15'; Riad 48'	Report	Vítor Silva 76'

Olympic Stadium, Amsterdam
Attendance: 3,448
Referee: Giovanni Mauro (ITA)

Semifinals

6 June 1928
19:00

Argentina	6–0	Egypt
Cherro 10'; Ferreira 32', 82'; Tarasconi 37', 54', 61'	Report

Olympic Stadium, Amsterdam
Attendance: 7,887
Referee: Pedro Escartín (ESP)

Bronze medal match

9 June 1928
16:00

Italy	11–3	Egypt
Schiavo 6', 42', 58'; Baloncieri 14', 52'; Banchero 19', 39', 44'; Magnozzi 72', 80', 88'	Report	Riad 12', 16'; El-Ezam 60'

Olympic Stadium, Amsterdam
Attendance: 6,378
Referee: Jan Langenus (BEL)

== Weightlifting ==
Two weightlifters, both male, represented Egypt in 1928. It was the nation's third appearance in the sport. El-Sayed Nosseir became Egypt's first Olympic champion (and first medalist of any kind) when he won the light heavyweight competition. He broke two world records (snatch and total) and the remaining two Olympic records (press and jerk) in doing so. Hussein Moukhtar competed in the middleweight, finishing 7th.

Lifter	Event	Press		Snatch		Clean & Jerk		Total	Rank
Lifter	Event	Result	Rank	Result	Rank	Result	Rank	Total	Rank
Hussein Moukhtar	Men's −75 kg	90	7	92.5	9	120	6	302.5	7
El-Sayed Nosseir	Men's −82.5 kg	100 OR	1	112.5 WR	1	142.5 OR	1	355 WR	1st place, gold medalist(s)

== Wrestling ==
Four wrestlers, all men, represented Egypt in 1928. It was the nation's third appearance in the sport. Ibrahim Moustafa earned Egypt's first medal in wrestling, a gold, by winning the men's light heavyweight Greco-Roman event. He had finished 4th in the event at the 1924 Games. Moustafa's medal was only Egypt's second in any sport; he missed becoming the first Egyptian Olympic champion only because his event finished one week after El-Sayed Nosseir's weightlifting event.

=== Greco-Roman wrestling ===
Athlete	Event	Round 1	Round 2	Round 3	Round 4	Round 5	Round 6	Round 7	Rank
Athlete	Event	Opposition Result	Opposition Result	Opposition Result	Opposition Result	Opposition Result	Opposition Result	Opposition Result	Rank
Ibrahim Kamel	Men's bantamweight	Aria (FRA); L Decision 3pts	Maudr (TCH); L Fall 6pts	Did not advance				—N/a	14
Ali Kamel	Men's featherweight	Kárpáti (HUN); L Fall 3pts	Arıkan (TUR); W Fall 3pts	Väli (EST); L Fall 6pts	Did not advance				10
Ibrahim Moustafa	Men's light heavyweight	Appels (BEL); W Fall 0pts	Şefik (TUR); W Decision 1pt	Bye	Hansen (DEN); W Fall 1pt	Pellinen (FIN); W Decision 2pts	Rieger (GER); W Decision 3pts	—N/a	1st place, gold medalist(s)
Ibrahim Sobh	Men's heavyweight	Badó (HUN); L Fall 3pts	Wiesberger (AUT); L Fall 6pts	Did not advance				—N/a	11
