= Mund (disambiguation) =

Mund is a commune in Valais, Switzerland.

Mund may also refer to:

== Surname ==
- Arthur Mund (1899–?), a diver in the 1928 Olympics
- Cara Mund, an American beauty pageant titleholder
- Frances Munds (1866–1948), an American suffragist
- Günther Mund (1934–2011), a diver in the 1948 and 1956 Olympics
- Lilo Mund (born 1939), a Chilean diver
- Pros Mund (c. 1589–1644), Danish admiral in the 17th century
- Uwe Mund (conductor) (born 1941)
- Uwe Mund (rower) (born 1962), rower in the 1988 Olympics
- Werner Mund, fencer
- Johannes Ludwig Leopold Mund, naturalist: see Mund and Maire

== Other uses ==
- Mund (law), a concept of the role of "protector" in Germanic law and early feudalism
- Mundu, an Indian garment
- A village or settlement in Toda society
- Mund, Gujrat, a village in Pakistan

== See also ==
- Munds, a related surname
