= Diving at the 1928 Summer Olympics – Men's 10 metre platform =

Men's 10 metre platform at the Games of the IX Olympiad

Medalists
1st place, gold medalist(s)		Pete Desjardins	United States
2nd place, silver medalist(s)		Farid Simaika	Egypt
3rd place, bronze medalist(s)		Michael Galitzen	United States

The men's 10 metre platform, also reported as high diving, was one of four diving events on the diving at the 1928 Summer Olympics programme. The competition was actually held from both 10 metre and 5 metre boards. Divers performed four compulsory dives – running plain dive, backward somersault (5 metre platform), standing plain dive, running plain dive (10 metre platform) – and four dives of the competitor's choice (different from the compulsory), from either platform, for a total of eight dives. The competition was held from Thursday 9 August 1928 to Saturday 11 August 1928. Twenty-four divers from twelve nations competed.

== Results ==
=== First round ===
The three divers who scored the smallest number of points in each group of the first round advanced to the final.

==== Group 1 ====
Rank	Diver	Nation	Points	Score	Notes
1	Walter Colbath	United States	5	91.68	Q
2	Albert Knight	Great Britain	14	83.48	Q
3	Karl Schumm	Germany	14	81.44	Q
4	Helge Öberg	Sweden	17	80.36	
5	Armand Billard	France	25	67.96	
6	Abdel Moneim Mokhtar	Egypt	31	59.14	
7	Harry Morris	Australia	34	53.42	
8	Emanuel Davidson	Netherlands	40	46.40	
9	Luigi Cangiullo	Italy		DNF	

==== Group 2 ====
Rank	Diver	Nation	Points	Score	Notes
1	Farid Simaika	Egypt	6	102.38	Q
2	Michael Galitzen	United States	9	98.56	Q
3	Julius Rehborn	Germany	15	83.46	Q
4	Eugène Lenormand	France	24	74.12	
5	Eugen Ahnström	Sweden	25	73.08	
6	Josef Staudinger	Austria	26	73.32	
7	Thomas Mather	Great Britain	35	55.10	

==== Group 3 ====
Rank	Diver	Nation	Points	Score	Notes
1	Pete Desjardins	United States	5	104.52	Q
2	Ewald Riebschläger	Germany	11	81.98	Q
3	Alfred Phillips	Canada	14	78.42	Q
4	Yrjö Lampila	Finland	21	72.34	
5	Wilfred Burne	Great Britain	25	71.20	
6	Henk Lotgering	Netherlands	33	67.76	
7	Gösta Horn	Sweden	35	63.84	
8	Ezio Selva	Italy	36	61.56	

=== Final ===
Simiaka was originally announced as the winner of the competition, and the Egyptian national anthem was played. The officials then declared that a mistake had been made, and that the number of judges ranking the diver higher, not total points or score, determined the winner. Four of the five judges had placed Desjardins 1st and Simaika 2nd; only one judge had Simaika 1st and Desjardins 2nd. Consequently, Desjardins was awarded his second gold medal.

Rank	Diver	Nation	Points						Score
Rank	Diver	Nation	Judge 1	Judge 2	Judge 3	Judge 4	Judge 5	Total	Score
1st place, gold medalist(s)	Pete Desjardins	United States	2	1	1	1	1	6	98.74
2nd place, silver medalist(s)	Farid Simaika	Egypt	1	2	2	2	2	9	99.58
3rd place, bronze medalist(s)	Michael Galitzen	United States	3	3	3	3	3	15	92.34
4	Walter Colbath	United States	4	5	4	4	4	21	85.78
5	Ewald Riebschläger	Germany	5	4	6	5	7	27	82.44
6	Karl Schumm	Germany	6	6	5	6	5	28	80.54
7	Alfred Phillips	Canada	7	7	7	8	6	35	77.26
8	Albert Knight	Great Britain	9	9	8	7	8	41	72.22
9	Julius Rehborn	Germany	8	8	9	9	9	43	67.78

== Sources ==
- Netherlands Olympic Committee (1928). "The Ninth Olympiad Amsterdam 1928 - Official Report" (PDF). Amsterdam J. H. de Bussy, Ltd. pp. p. 778. Archived from the original (pdf) on 8 April 2008.
- Herman de Wael (26 January 2001). "Diving - men's platform (Amsterdam 1928)".
