= Diving at the 1928 Summer Olympics – Men's 3 metre springboard =

Men's 3 metre springboard at the Games of the IX Olympiad

Medalists
1st place, gold medalist(s)		Pete Desjardins	United States
2nd place, silver medalist(s)		Michael Galitzen	United States
3rd place, bronze medalist(s)		Farid Simaika	Egypt

The men's 3 metre springboard, also reported as fancy diving, was one of four diving events on the diving at the 1928 Summer Olympics programme. The competition was actually held from both 3 metre and 1 metre boards. Divers performed five compulsory dives from the 3 metre board – running plain header forward, standing backward header, running isander (half gainer), backward spring and forward dive, running header forward with half screw – and six dives of the competitor's choice (different from the compulsory), from either board, for a total of eleven dives. The competition was held from Monday 6 August 1928 to Wednesday 8 August 1928. Twenty-three divers from fifteen nations competed.

== Results ==
=== First round ===
A point-for-place system was used to determine qualification for the final. Each of the five judges arrived at a final score for each diver. The diver with the best score from a judge received 1 point, second-best received 2 points, and so on; this process repeated for each judge. The three divers who scored the smallest number of points in each group of the first round advanced to the final.

==== Group 1 ====
Place	Diver	Nation	Points	Score
1	Pete Desjardins	United States	5	182.10
2	Heinz Plumanns	Germany	12	148
3	Alfred Phillips	Canada	17	134.10
4	Luciano Cozzi	Italy	20	129.14
5	Edmund Lindmark	Sweden	22	123.70
6	Henk Lotgering	Netherlands	29	112.98
7	Armand Billard	France	37	101.44
8	Josef Nesvadba	Czechoslovakia	38	102.48

==== Group 2 ====
Place	Diver	Nation	Points	Score
1	Michael Galitzen	United States	5	178.94
2	Farid Simaika	Egypt	10	164.96
3	Ewald Riebschläger	Germany	15	151.20
4	Julius Balasz	Czechoslovakia	20	139.24
5	Curt Sjöberg	Sweden	27	129.26
6	Josef Staudinger	Austria	28	128.54
7	Arthur Bischoff	Switzerland	35	100.14
8	Harry Morris	Australia	40	94.96

==== Group 3 ====
Place	Diver	Nation	Points	Score
1	Harold Smith	United States	5	169.70
2	Arthur Mund	Germany	11	148.48
3	Fumio Takashina	Japan	14	139.82
4	Maurice Lepage	France	21	132.52
5	Louis Gompers	Netherlands	24	123.24
6	Federico Mariscal	Mexico	31	88.84
7	Stanley C. Mercer	Great Britain	34	81.84

=== Final ===
The Official Report shows both the raw scores and the points determined via the point-for-place system used in the preliminary round. However, neither was used to determine the winners. Instead, the divers were ranked based on how many judges had scored them better than the next diver. Thus, Simaika (13 points) finished behind Galitzen (14 points) because 3 judges had given Galitzen higher scores (placing him 2nd and Simaika 3rd) and 2 judges had given Simaika higher scores (placing him 2nd, Smith 3rd, and Galitzen 4th—causing Galitzen to have a higher point-for-place score).

Rank	Diver	Nation	Points						Score
Rank	Diver	Nation	Judge 1	Judge 2	Judge 3	Judge 4	Judge 5	Total	Score
1st place, gold medalist(s)	Pete Desjardins	United States	1	1	1	1	1	5	185.04
2nd place, silver medalist(s)	Michael Galitzen	United States	2	4	2	2	4	14	174.06
3rd place, bronze medalist(s)	Farid Simaika	Egypt	3	2	3	3	2	13	172.46
4	Harold Smith	United States	4	3	4	4	3	18	168.96
5	Arthur Mund	Germany	6	5	5	7.5	6	29.5	154.72
6	Ewald Riebschläger	Germany	7	6	6	5	7	31	153.86
7	Alfred Phillips	Canada	5	8	7	7.5	5	32.5	149.48
8	Heinz Plumanns	Germany	8	7	8	6	8	37	150.18
9	Fumo Takashina	Japan	9	9	9	9	9	45	139.78

== Sources ==
- Netherlands Olympic Committee (1928). "The Ninth Olympiad Amsterdam 1928 - Official Report" (PDF). Amsterdam J. H. de Bussy, Ltd. pp. p. 774. Archived from the original (pdf) on 8 April 2008.
- Herman de Wael (24 May 2001). "Diving - men's springboard (Amsterdam 1928)".
