= Rehborn (surname) =

Rehborn is a surname. Notable people with the surname include:

- Anni Rehborn (1904–1986), German swimmer
- Hanni Rehborn (1907–1987), German diver
- Julius Rehborn (1899–1987), German diver
