= Diving at the 1928 Summer Olympics – Women's 3 metre springboard =

Women's 3 metre springboard at the Games of the IX Olympiad

Medalists
| 1st place, gold medalist(s) | | Helen Meany | United States |
| 2nd place, silver medalist(s) | | Dorothy Poynton | United States |
| 3rd place, bronze medalist(s) | | Georgia Coleman | United States |

The women's 3 metre springboard, also reported as fancy diving, was one of four diving events on the diving at the 1928 Summer Olympics programme. The competition was actually held from both 3 metre and 1 metre boards. Divers performed three compulsory dives from the 3 metre board – running plain header forward, standing backward header, backward spring and forward dive – and three dives of the competitor's choice (different from the compulsory), from either board, for a total of six dives. The competition was held on Thursday 9 August 1928. Ten divers from four nations competed.

== Results ==
Since there were only ten entries for this event, instead of groups, a direct final was contested.

| Place | Diver | Nation | Points | Score |
|---|---|---|---|---|
| 1st place, gold medalist(s) | Helen Meany | United States | 6 | 78.62 |
| 2nd place, silver medalist(s) | Dorothy Poynton-Hill | United States | 13 | 75.62 |
| 3rd place, bronze medalist(s) | Georgia Coleman | United States | 14 | 73.38 |
| 4 | Ilse Meudtner | Germany | 22 | 67.42 |
| 5 | Margret Borgs | Germany | 26 | 65.16 |
| 6 | Lini Söhnchen | Germany | 34 | 63.28 |
| 7 | Truus Klapwijk | Netherlands | 35 | 60.98 |
| 8 | Alida van Leeuwen | Netherlands | 35 | 59.82 |
| 9 | Klara Bornett | Austria | 40 | 56.90 |
| 10 | Catharina Hesterman | Netherlands | 50 | 48.20 |

== Sources ==
- Netherlands Olympic Committee (1928). "The Ninth Olympiad Amsterdam 1928 - Official Report" (PDF). Amsterdam J. H. de Bussy, Ltd. pp. p. 792. Archived from the original (pdf) on 8 April 2008.
- Herman de Wael (9 October 2002). "Diving - women's springboard (Amsterdam 1928)".
