= Diving at the 1928 Summer Olympics – Women's 10 metre platform =

Women's 10 metre platform at the Games of the IX Olympiad

Medalists
1st place, gold medalist(s)		Elizabeth Becker-Pinkston; United States
2nd place, silver medalist(s)		Georgia Coleman; United States
3rd place, bronze medalist(s)		Laura Sjöqvist; Sweden

The women's 10 metre platform, also reported as high diving, was one of four diving events on the diving at the 1928 Summer Olympics programme. The competition was actually held from both 10 metre and 5 metre boards. Divers performed a total of four compulsory dives: a standing plain header and running plain header from both the 10 metre and 5 metre platforms. The competition was held on Friday 10 August 1928, and on Saturday 11 August 1928. Seventeen divers from eight nations competed.

== Results ==
=== First round ===
The three divers who scored the smallest number of points in each group of the first round advanced to the final.

==== Group 1 ====
Rank	Diver	Nation	Points	Score	Notes
1	Elizabeth Becker-Pinkston	United States	6	32.00	Q
2	Georgia Coleman	United States	9.5	31.40	Q
3	Greta Onnela	Finland	21	28.00	Q
4	Isabelle White	Great Britain	22.5	27.80	
5	Ingegärd Töpel	Sweden	24	27.00	
6	Edith Nielsen	Denmark	29	26.20	
7	Truus Klapwijk	Netherlands	31.5	26.00	
8	Hjördis Töpel	Sweden	38.5	24.60	
9	Margret Borgs	Germany	43	23.60	

==== Group 2 ====
Rank	Diver	Nation	Points	Score	Notes
1	Laura Sjöqvist	Sweden	8	29.20	Q
2	Mietje Baron	Netherlands	12	28.40	Q
3	Hanni Rehborn	Germany	14.5	28.20	Q
4	Renée Cretté-Flavier	France	17.5	27.60	
5	Alida van Leeuwen	Netherlands	24	26.20	
6	Clarita Hunsberger	United States	29.5	24.40	
7	Doris Grimes	Great Britain	34.5	22.80	
8	Kathleen Le Rossignol	Great Britain	39.5	19.80	

=== Final ===
Rank	Diver	Nation	Points	Score
1st place, gold medalist(s)	Elizabeth Becker-Pinkston	United States	9	31.60
2nd place, silver medalist(s)	Georgia Coleman	United States	10.5	30.60
3rd place, bronze medalist(s)	Laura Sjöqvist	Sweden	13.5	29.20
4	Mietje Baron	Netherlands	21	27.20
5	Greta Onnela	Finland	25	26.00
6	Hanni Rehborn	Germany	26	26.50

== Sources ==
- Netherlands Olympic Committee (1928). "The Ninth Olympiad Amsterdam 1928 - Official Report" (PDF). Amsterdam J. H. de Bussy, Ltd. pp. p. 794. Archived from the original (pdf) on 8 April 2008.
- Herman de Wael (7 August 2001). "Diving - women's platform (Amsterdam 1928)".
