= Walter Colbath =

American diver (1906–1986)

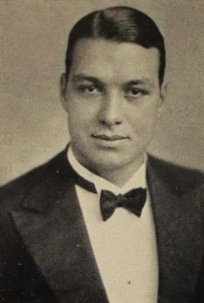
- Colbath, circa 1930 Northwestern Junior Class Photo

Personal information
- Full name: Walter Newell Colbath Sr.
- Born: March 10, 1906 Saginaw, Michigan, U.S.
- Died: March 24, 1986 (aged 80) Palm Beach Gardens, Florida, U.S.
- Height: 6 ft 2 in (1.88 m)
- Spouse: Vesta Swenson

Sport
- Sport: Diving, Freestyle swimming
- College team: Northwestern University 1930
- Club: Chicago Athletic Association; Illinois Athletic Club
- Coached by: Tom Robinson (Northwestern)

Walter Newell Colbath Sr. (March 10, 1906 – March 24, 1986) was an American diver and swimmer who competed for Northwestern University and placed fourth in the platform diving competition at the 1928 Amsterdam Olympics. He later had short careers in radio, and as a prep school diving and swimming coach. After WWII Naval service at Great Lakes Naval base in Chicago, and later the Pacific, he had a long career as a manager in the steel industry.

Colbath was born March 10, 1906, to Richard Colbath and Agnes Cora Russell in Saginaw, Michigan. After a family move, he attended Lane Manual Technical High School in North, Chicago, Illinois, where he may have received training that prepared him for his subsequent career in the steel industry. By 1923, he represented Lane Technical in diving competition, where he competed in the Interscholastic Championships at the Illinois Athletic Club Pool in Chicago that December. He later competed and trained with the Chicago Athletic Association and Illinois Athletic Club during his swimming career. At the Illinois Athletic Club, he may have received training from their Hall of Fame Head Coach Bill Bachrach

== Northwestern University ==
Colbath, seated (2rd from R), 1927 NU swim team

He attended Northwestern University from 1926 to 1930 where he competed under Hall of Fame Head Coach Tom Robinson. He met his wife Vesta H. Swenson while at Northwestern, where she was voted the "1931 Northwestern Beauty Queen" by her class. During his collegiate swimming career, he was a National Collegiate diving champion in 1928, 1929, and 1930.

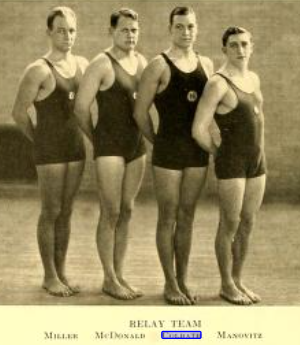
Colbath, (3rd from l), 1927 NU relay team

While at Northwestern, Colbath distinguished himself as one of the more outstanding collegiate divers of his era. As a sophomore, he captured second place in the Big Ten Conference diving championships and won the NCAA diving title. In his Sophomore year, though he was undefeated in diving events, he also swam with the 4-man Northwestern freestyle relay team, which finished the year with a 4–2 record. In his Junior, year where he served as Class President, he captured both Conference and NCAA titles and won his place on the 1928 U.S. Olympic team.

As a Senior around 1929–1930, he served as team captain, placed second in the Big Ten Conference, and captured the NCAA Diving title. He was a Central American Athletic Union diving Champion for seven consecutive years prior to 1932. Colbath was a member of Sigma Alpha Epsilon Fraternity and graduated Northwestern in the Spring of 1930.

In February, 1927, he served as a pall bearer, along with Johnny Weissmuller for fellow IAC swimmer, Northwestern Student and 1924 Olympic swimming gold medalist Sybil Bauer. Bauer won the 100-meter backstroke at the 1924 Paris Olympics, and had been a friend of Weissmuller.

== 1928 Amsterdam Olympics ==
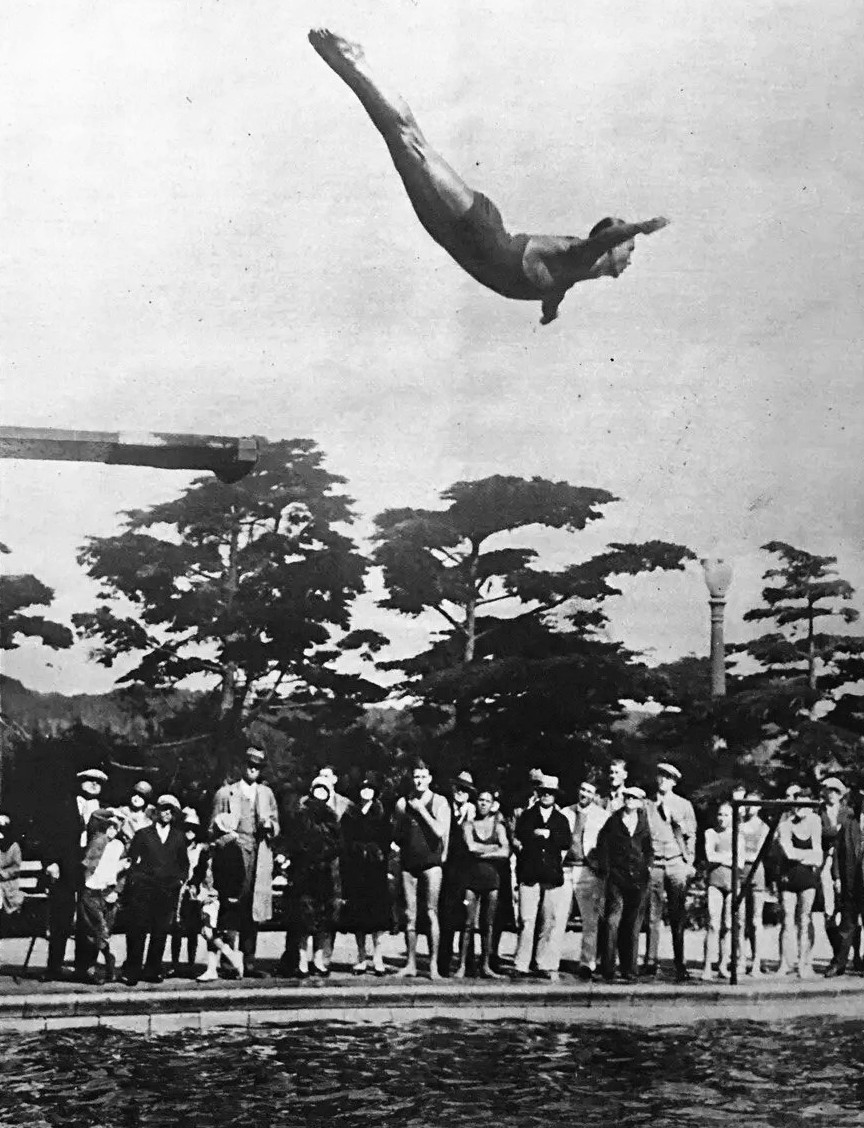
Colbath in swan dive, 1928

During his Junior year at Northwestern, he competed in the men's 10 metre platform event at the 1928 Summer Olympics where he placed fourth in Platform Diving. Americans Pete Desjardins took the gold, and Micky Galitzen took bronze. Colbath's stocky, muscular build and six foot height was unusual for a young competitive diver during his era.

Colbath married Vesta Swenson, a Northwestern graduate, and member of the Kappa Kappa Gamma Sorority on June 16, 1932, in Evanston, Illinois at her home on Lincoln Street. Colbath was working as the radio character Lilac with station WGN at the time.

He performed as a diver at the Streets of Paris Pavilion at the Chicago World's fair in 1933, and again when the fair opened in 1934.

== Post-collegiate careers ==
In an early radio career in the 1930s, he played the role of Lilac on Chicago's WGN, as part of the Harold Dean Show and later played the part of Jack Armstrong. He began a coaching career as a swimming and diving coach at Evanston's St. George High School and in 1935 began coaching swimming and diving at New Hampshire's prestigious preparatory school, Phillips Exeter Academy in Exeter, New Hampshire.

While serving in WWII in the 1940s, as a commissioned Lieutenant, Colbath oversaw a strenuous training program for commando naval recruits at the Great Lakes Naval Training Center in the greater Chicago area beginning in 1942. His responsibilities also included the recruitment of around 40 of the nation's top swimmers to teach basic swimming skills to thousands of new Naval recruits, who were required to swim a minimum of 50 yards. He also coached a competitive swimming team for Navy. He continued to serve with the U.S. Navy in the Pacific, and eventually earned the rank of Lieutenant Commander.

After WWII, Colbath served in industry, beginning with Ryerson Steel and then worked for the Chicago Steel Service. He later started his own company in Riviera Beach, Florida, which provided a large percentage of the steel used in the development of the Bahamas. He lived in Palm Beach, Florida after 1958 only six miles from his steel company in Riviera Beach.

He died on March 24, 1986, at a Palm Beach Gardens Nursing Home and was buried in Saint Mark's Episcopal Church Columbarium. He was survived by his wife Vesta, a son, Walter Jr. who became a Judge, three grandchildren and a sister.

=== Honors ===
He was inducted into the Northwestern University Athletic Hall of Fame in May 1986.
