= Caroline Smith (diver) =

American diver

Caroline Macias
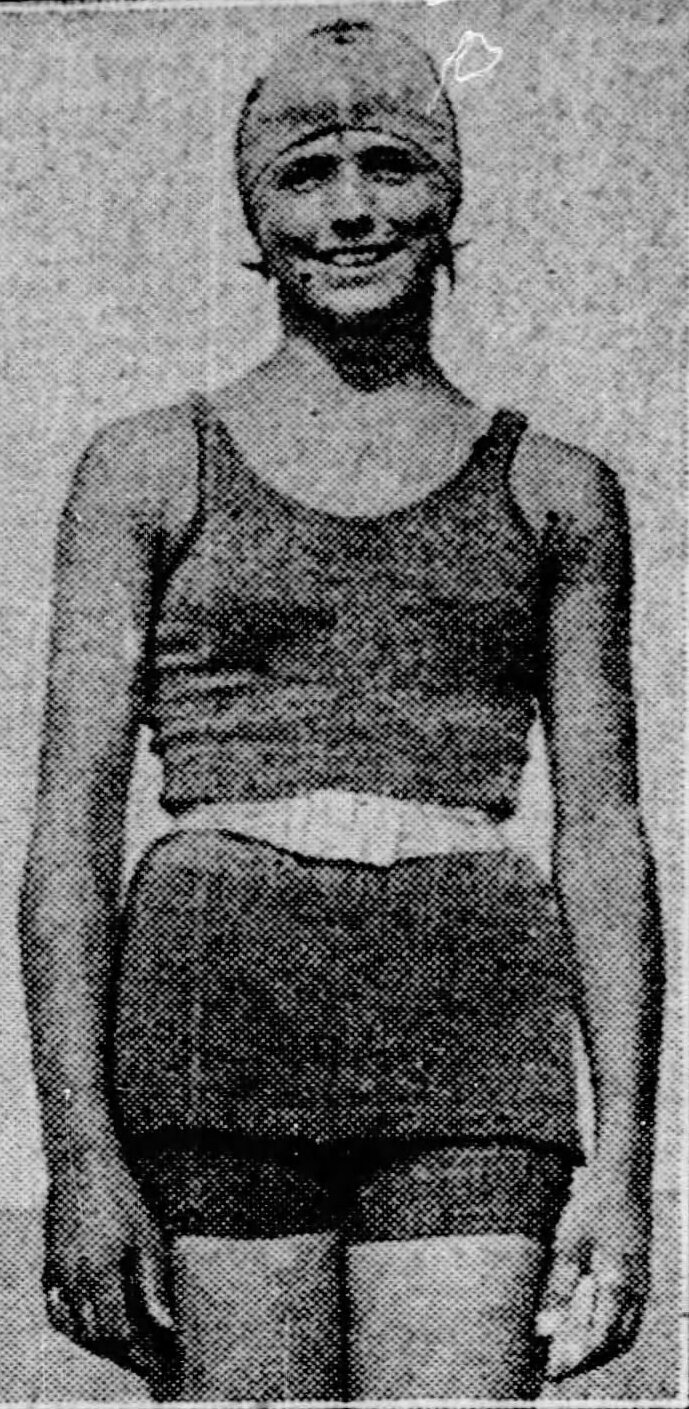
- Smith circa 1924

Personal information
- Born: Caroline Smith; July 21, 1906 Cairo, Illinois, United States
- Died: November 11, 1994 (aged 88) Las Vegas, Nevada, United States
Medal record
Women's diving
Representing the United States
Olympic Games
Gold medal – first place	1924 Paris	10 m platform

Caroline Smith (later Macias) (July 21, 1906 – November 11, 1994) was an American diver who competed in the 1924 Summer Olympics.

On the eve of her 18th birthday, July 20, 1924, in Paris, France, Smith won the gold medal in the 10 meter platform competition. She defeated teammate Elizabeth Becker-Pinkston by a half-point in the judges' scoring.

Smith was inducted in the International Swimming Hall of Fame in 1988.
