= Hassan Niazi =

Hassan Niazi may refer to:

- Hassan Niazi (fencer), an Egyptian fencer
- Hassan Niazi (actor), a Pakistani actor
