= Munds =

Munds is a surname. Notable people with the surname include:

- Arthur Munds (1870−1940), English cricketer
- Frances Munds (1866–1948), American suffragist
- Raymond Munds (1882–1962), English cricketer, brother of Arthur

== See also ==
- Munds Park, Arizona
