= Alida van Leeuwen =

Dutch diver (1908–1991)

Alie van Leeuwen
Personal information
- Full name: Alida Impia Maria van Leeuwen
- Nationality: Dutch
- Born: 13 August 1908; Amsterdam, Netherlands
- Died: 23 October 1991 (aged 83); Amstelveen, Netherlands

Sport
- Sport: Diving

Alida Impia Maria "Alie" van Leeuwen (13 August 1908 – 23 October 1991) was a Dutch diver. She competed in two events (3 metre springboard & 10 metre platform) at the 1928 Summer Olympics.
