= Gompers =

Gompers is a surname. Notable people with the surname include:

- Bill Gompers (1928–2019), American football player
- Louis Gompers (1902–1981), Dutch diver
- Paul A. Gompers (born 1964), American economist and professor
- Samuel Gompers (1850–1924), American labor union leader of the American Federation of Labor
