= Diving at the 1928 Summer Olympics =

Coordinates: 52.3475°N 4.8561°E

Diving at the Games of the IX Olympiad
- Venue: Olympic Sports Park Swim Stadium
- Dates: 6 August 1928 through 11 August 1928
- No. of events: 4
- Competitors: 61 from 17 nations

At the 1928 Summer Olympics in Amsterdam, four diving events were contested. The men's plain high diving event was dropped from the Olympic program. The competitions were held from Monday, 6 August 1928 to Saturday, 11 August 1928.

== Medal summary ==
The events are labelled as 3 metre springboard and 10 metre platform by the International Olympic Committee, and appeared on the 1928 Official Report as fancy diving and high diving, respectively. The platform events included dives from both 10 metre and 5 metre platforms, while the springboard events included dives from 3 metre and 1 metre springboards.

=== Men ===
Event	Gold	Silver	Bronze
3 m springboard	Pete Desjardins (USA)	Michael Galitzen (USA)	Farid Simaika (EGY)
10 m platform	Pete Desjardins (USA)	Farid Simaika (EGY)	Michael Galitzen (USA)

=== Women ===
Event	Gold	Silver	Bronze
3 m springboard	Helen Meany (USA)	Dorothy Poynton (USA)	Georgia Coleman (USA)
10 m platform	Elizabeth Becker-Pinkston (USA)	Georgia Coleman (USA)	Laura Sjöqvist (SWE)

== Participating nations ==
A total of 61 divers (38 men and 23 women) from 17 nations (men from 16 nations - women from 9 nations) competed at the Amsterdam Games:

- Australia (1) (men:1 women:0)
- Austria (2) (men:1 women:1)
- Canada (1) (men:1 women:0)
- Czechoslovakia (2) (men:2 women:0)
- Denmark (1) (men:0 women:1)
- Egypt (2) (men:2 women:0)
- Finland (2) (men:1 women:1)
- France (4) (men:3 women:1)
- Germany (9) (men:5 women:4)
- Great Britain (7) (men:4 women:3)
- Italy (3) (men:3 women:0)
- Japan (1) (men:1 women:0)
- Mexico (1) (men:1 women:0)
- Netherlands (7) (men:3 women:4)
- Sweden (8) (men:5 women:3)
- Switzerland (1) (men:1 women:0)
- United States (9) (men:4 women:5)

== Medal table ==
Rank	Nation	Gold	Silver	Bronze	Total
1	United States	4	3	2	9
2	Egypt	0	1	1	2
3	Sweden	0	0	1	1
Totals (3 entries)		4	4	4	12
