= Ilse Meudtner =

German diver

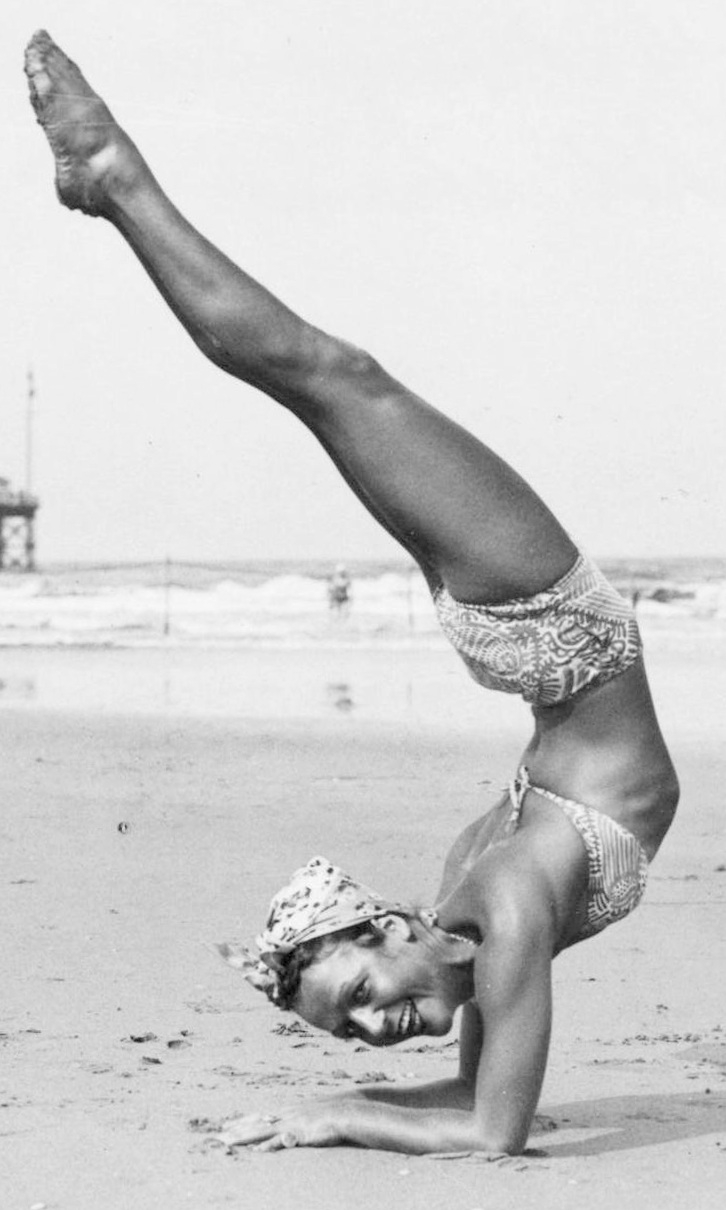
- Ilse Meudtner in 1940

Personal information
- Born: 1 November 1912 Berlin, Germany
- Died: 18 July 1990 (aged 77) Madrid, Spain

Sport
- Sport: Diving
- Club: SG Neukölln Berlin

Ilse Meudtner (1 November 1912 – 18 July 1990) was a German diver and dancer. She competed at the 1928 Summer Olympics in the 3 m springboard and finished fourth.

Between 1934 and 1940 Meudtner was a solo dancer at the Berlin State Opera, and during World War II she performed abroad. After the war she married a Dutch man and became a Dutch citizen. An injury in 1955 ended her dancing career. From 1964 she worked as a journalist in Madrid, reporting on the country and its people several times for Die Zeit.
