= Mahmoud Houda =

Egyptian footballer (1899–1964)

Personal information
- Full name: Mahmoud Ismail Mohamed Houda
- Date of birth: 2 April 1899
- Place of birth: Alexandria, Egypt
- Date of death: 3 June 1964 (aged 65)
- Place of death: Alexandria, Egypt
- Position: Forward

Senior career*
Years	Team	Apps	(Gls)
- Al Ittihad

International career
1924–1928	Egypt	4	(1)
1924–1928	Egypt Olympic	5	(0)
- * Club domestic league appearances and goals

Mahmoud Ismail Mohamed Houda (Arabic: محمود حوده; 2 April 1899 – 3 June 1964), known as Abu Rajul Dahab (Arabic: أبو رجل دهب) affectionately by supporters of Al Ittihad, was an Egyptian footballer who represented Egypt as a forward at both the 1924 and the 1928 Summer Olympics.

== Club career ==
Houda spent the majority of his career with Al Ittihad, the club his elder brother, Hassan Rasmi, had helped to found. Alongside his younger brother, Sayed Houda, he lifted the Egypt Cup in 1926. The pair were recruited by Al Ahly for tours to Europe during the 1920s. Houda retired from playing in 1937.
