= Sophie Hennebert =

Belgian diver (1904–1957)

Personal information
- Nationality: Belgian
- Born: 13 September 1904; Brussels, Belgium
- Died: 19 September 1957 (aged 53); Stamford, Connecticut, U.S.

Sport
- Sport: Diving

Sophie Hennebert (13 September 1904 – 19 September 1957) was a Belgian diver. She competed in the women's 10 metre platform event at the 1924 Summer Olympics.
