= Hidekatsu Ishida =

Japanese diver

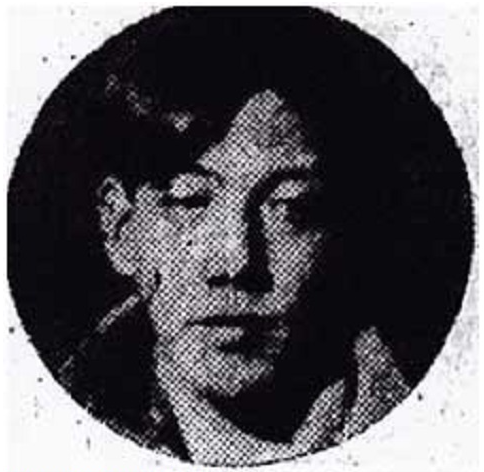

Personal information
- Native name: 石田 英勝
- Nationality: Japanese
- Born: 1908 Oita Prefecture, Japan
- Died: February 1945 (aged 36–37) Philippines

Sport
- Sport: Diving

Hidekatsu Ishida (石田 英勝, Ishida Hidekatsu; 1908 – February 1945) was a Japanese diver. He competed in the men's 10 metre platform event at the 1932 Summer Olympics.

== Personal life ==
An aviator in civilian life, Ishida died in the during World War II while serving in the Special Flying Unit of the Imperial Japanese Army in the Philippines.
