= Renée Cretté-Flavier =

French diver

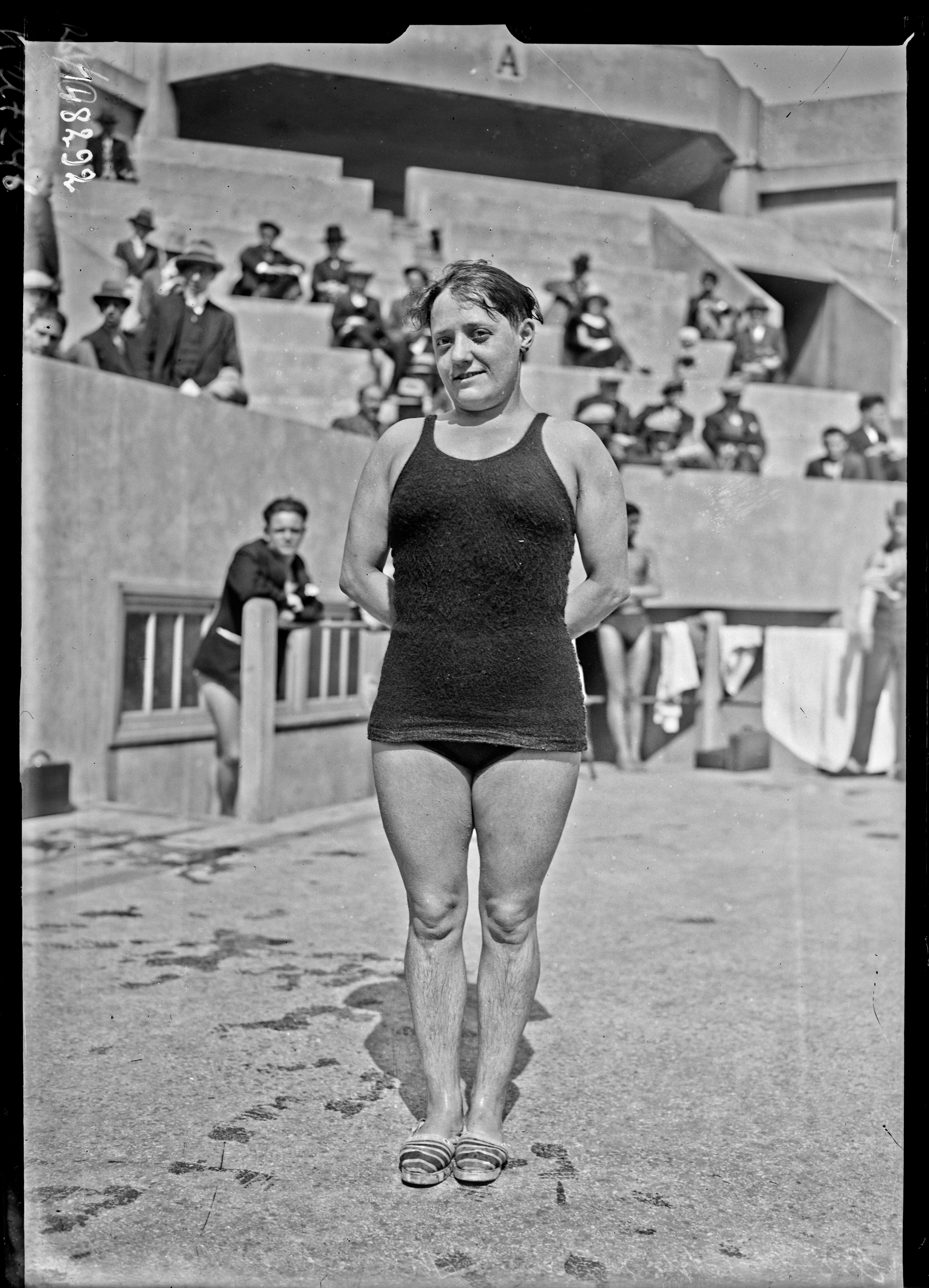
- Renée Cretté-Flavier in 1930 during the French swimming championship

Personal information
- Nationality: French
- Born: 20 August 1902 Paris, France
- Died: 25 May 1985 (aged 82) Lyon, France

Sport
- Sport: Diving
Medal record
Women's diving
Representing France
European Championships
Bronze medal – third place	1931 Paris	Platform

Renée Cretté-Flavier (20 August 1902 – 25 May 1985) was a French diver. She competed in the women's 10 metre platform event at the 1928 Summer Olympics, but did not advance to the final.
