= Emanuel Davidson =

Dutch diver

Personal information
- Nationality: Dutch
- Born: 19 August 1902; Amsterdam, Netherlands
- Died: 3 November 1955 (aged 53); Groningen, Netherlands

Sport
- Sport: Diving

Emanuel Davidson (19 August 1902 – 3 November 1955) was a Dutch diver. He competed in the men's 10 metre platform event at the 1928 Summer Olympics.
