= Maurice Lepage =

French diver

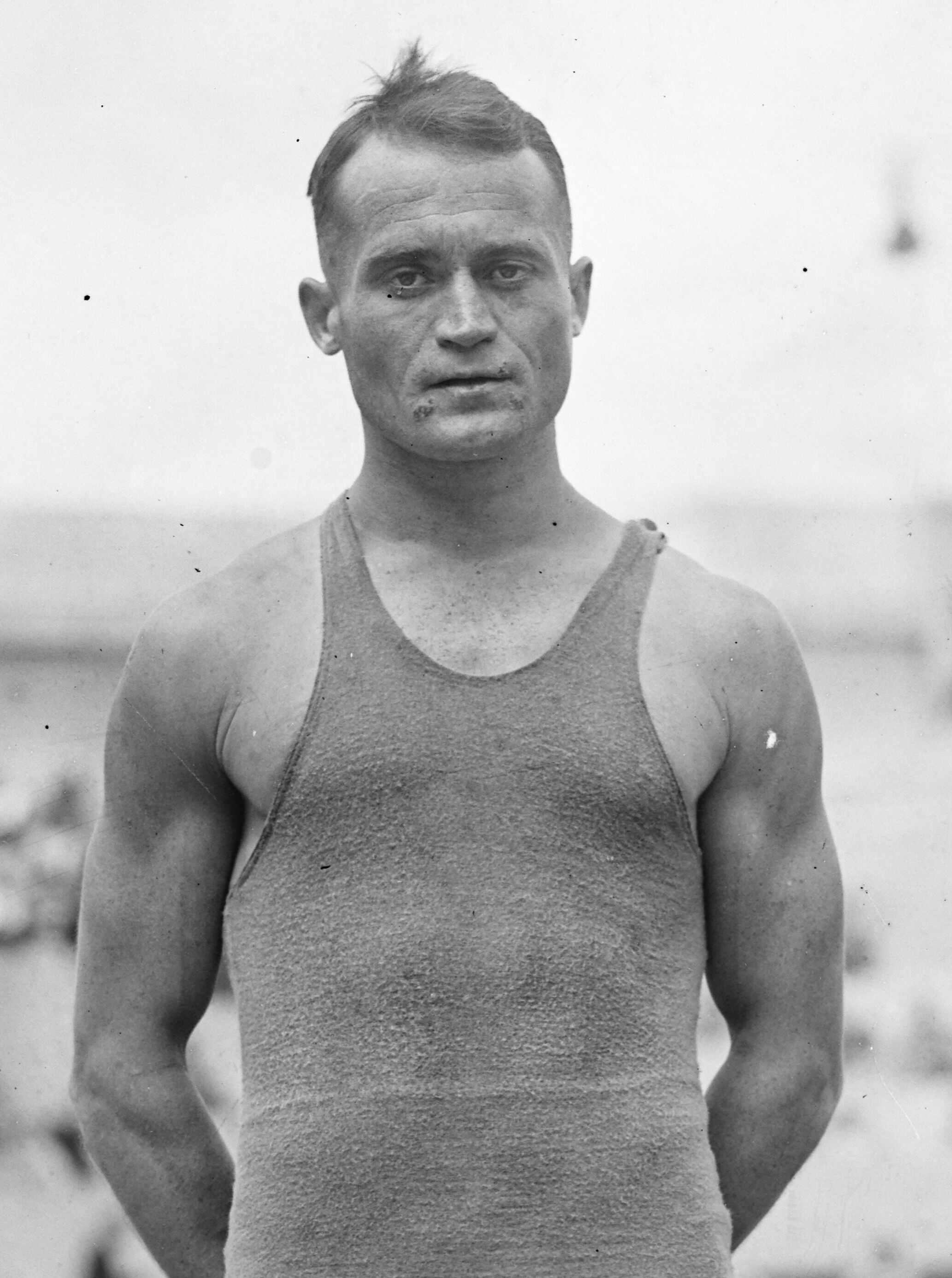
- Maurice Lepage in 1929

Personal information
- Full name: Maurice Henri Marius Lepage
- Nationality: French
- Born: 24 December 1904 Noviant-aux-Prés, France
- Died: 12 July 1945 (aged 40) Nancy, France

Sport
- Sport: Diving
Medal record
Men's diving
Representing France
European Championships
Silver medal – second place	1931 Paris	3 m springboard

Maurice Lepage was a French diver. He competed in the men's 3 metre springboard event at the 1928 Summer Olympics.
