= Heinz Plumanns =

German diver

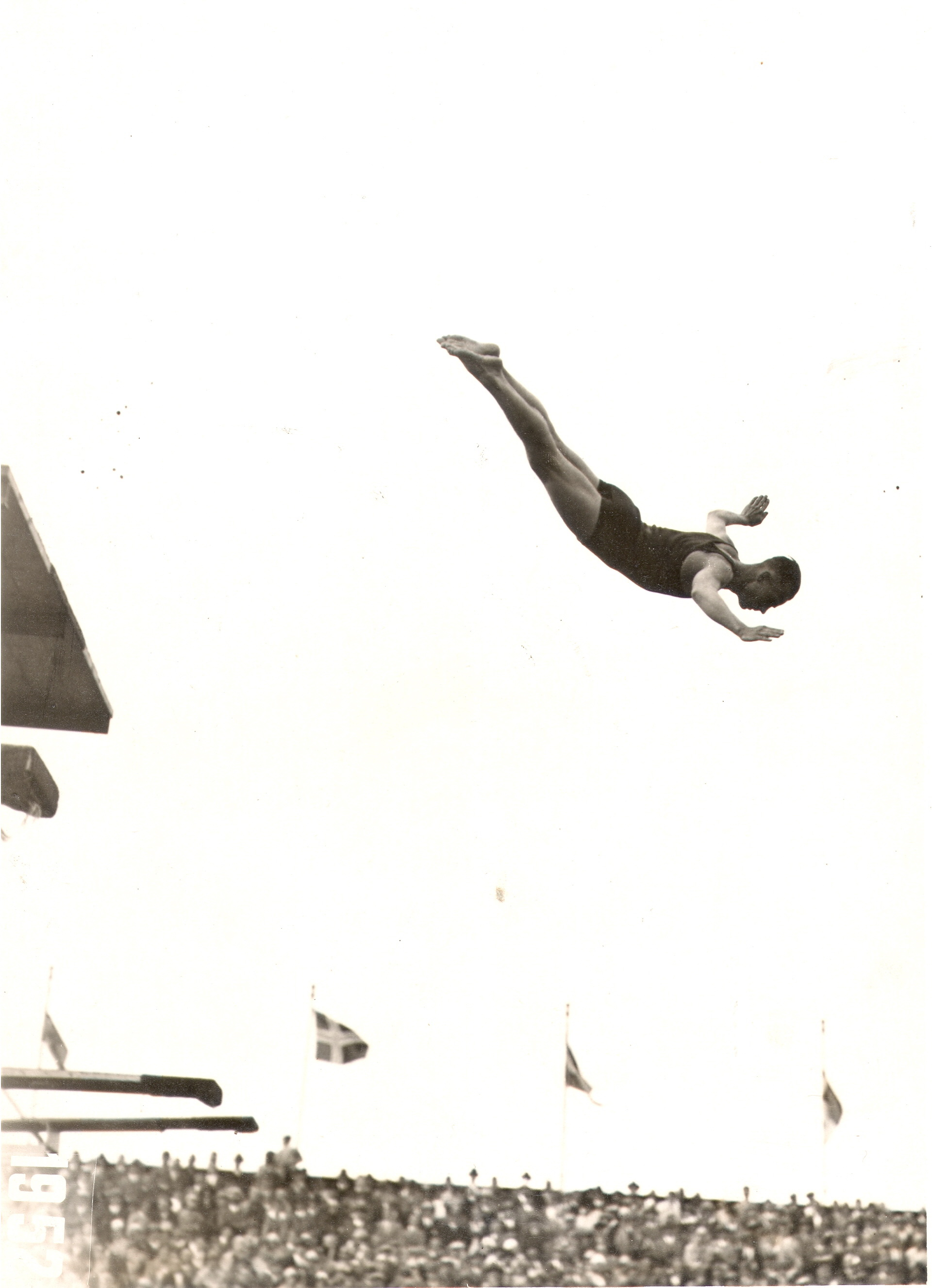
- Heinz Plumanns in 1928

Personal information
- Born: 28 June 1902; Cologne, Germany
- Died: 12 January 1986 (aged 83); Bad Neuenahr-Ahrweiler, West Germany

Sport
- Sport: Diving

Heinz Plumanns (28 June 1902 – 12 January 1986) was a German diver who competed in the 1928 Summer Olympics. In 1928 he finished eighth in the 3 metre springboard competition.
