= Luciano Cozzi =

Italian diver (1909–1996)

Personal information
- Nationality: Italian
- Born: 9 September 1909 Milan, Italy
- Died: 18 September 1986 (aged 77) Milan, Italy

Sport
- Sport: Diving
Medal record
Representing Italy
European Championships
Bronze medal – third place	1927 Bologna	3 m springboard

Luciano Cozzi (9 September 1909 – 18 September 1996) was an Italian diver. He competed in the men's 3 metre springboard event at the 1928 Summer Olympics.
