= Lini Söhnchen =

German diver

Personal information
- Born: July 19, 1897 Witten, German Empire
- Died: June 2, 1978 (aged 80)

Sport
- Sport: Diving
Medal record
Representing Germany
European Championships
Silver medal – second place	1927 Bologna	3 m springboard

Karoline "Lini" Söhnchen (19 July 1897 – 2 June 1978) was a German diver who competed in the 1928 Summer Olympics. She was born in Witten. In 1928 she finished sixth in the 3 metre springboard event.

She was the German national champion eight times (in 1921 and 1922 and consecutively from 1924 to 1929).
