= Frank Kurtz =

American diver and United States Air Force officer (1911–1996)

Colonel Frank Kurtz
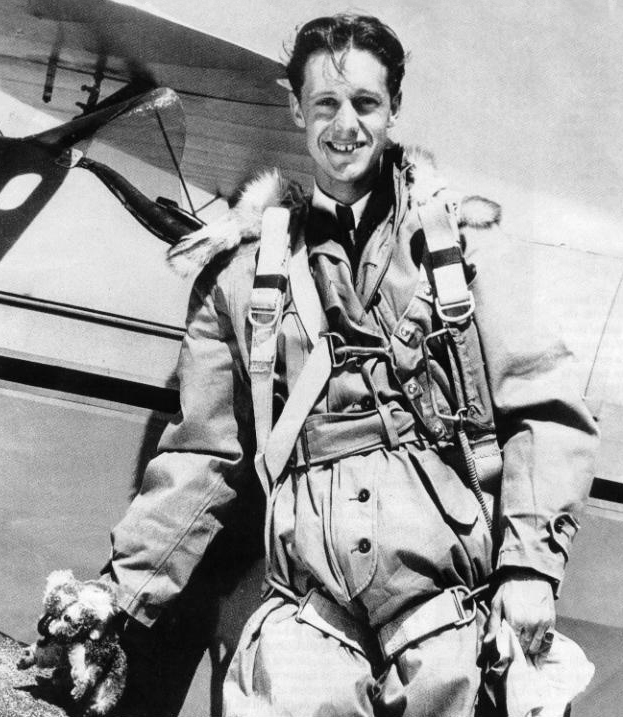
- Kurtz in 1935
- Born: Frank Allen Kurtz Jr. September 11, 1911; Davenport, Iowa, U.S.
- Died: October 31, 1996 (aged 85); North Hollywood, Los Angeles, U.S.
- Spouse: Margaret Rogers
- Relatives: Swoosie Kurtz (daughter)
- Military career
- Allegiance: United States
- Branch: United States Air Force
- Rank: Colonel
- Units: 463rd Bomb Group; United States Army Air Corps; United States Army Air Forces; United States Air Force
- Awards: Croix de Guerre (Fr); Silver Stars (3); Distinguished Flying Crosses (3); Air Medals (3); Presidential Citations (5)
- Other work: Executive at William May Garland

Frank Kurtz
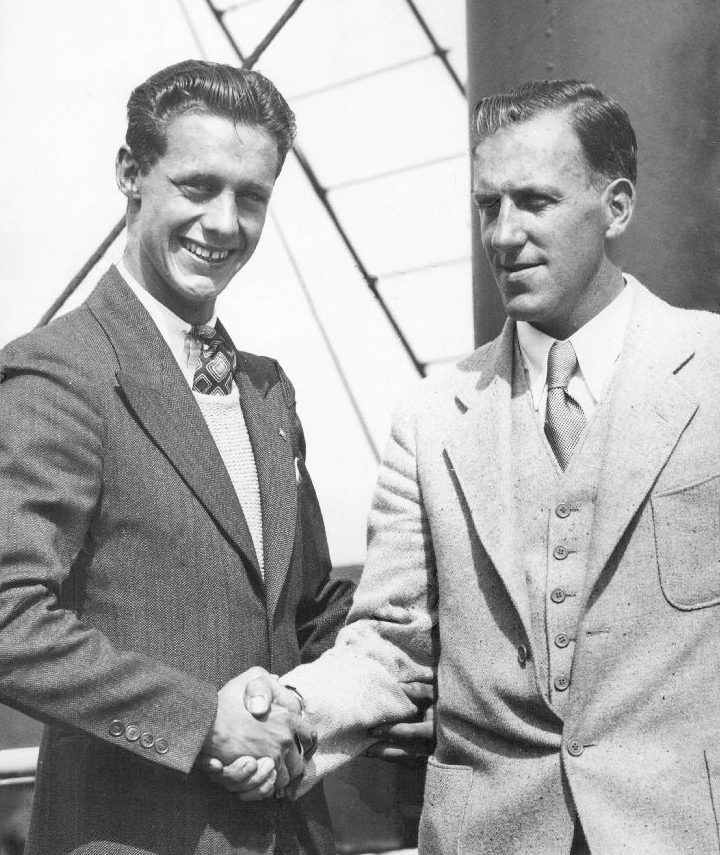
- Kurtz (left) and Swendsen in 1931

Sport
- Sport: Diving
- Club: Los Angeles Athletic Club
Medal record
Representing the United States
Olympic Games
Bronze medal – third place	1932 Los Angeles	10 m platform

Colonel Frank Allen Kurtz Jr. (September 9, 1911 – October 31, 1996) was an American Olympic diver and an aviator in the United States Army Air Forces.

== Life and career ==
Kurtz was born in Davenport, Iowa, the third child of Dora Lee (née Fenton) and Frank Allen Kurtz, Sr., an insurance salesman. He grew up in Kansas City, Missouri. Kurtz became interested in flying at age 16, and in 1935 flew an open cockpit plane, setting a speed record flight from Los Angeles to Mexico City to Washington, D.C., and back to Los Angeles.

Kurtz's diving abilities impressed Olympic champion swimmer Johnny Weissmuller, who encouraged him to train with famous coach Clyde Swendsen.

Kurtz graduated from Hollywood High School and went on to the University of Southern California especially to join the diving team. He won a bronze medal in the 10 meter platform at the 1932 Olympics and placed fifth in 1936, competing with an injured shoulder. He also won the AAU platform title in 1933.

== Military career ==
Kurtz joined the Army to train as a pilot, anticipating a career in commercial aviation. Before the war, he held the national junior transcontinental speed record and established half a dozen other speed marks for light planes.

He was Commander of the 463d Bombardment Group (Heavy), 15th Air Force, Celone Airfield, Foggia, Italy (1944–45) and a survivor of the air attack at Clark Field in the Philippines, two days after the Japanese attack on Pearl Harbor on December 7, 1941. In Australia, he salvaged and helped to rebuild a B-17D Flying Fortress bomber using a combination of parts from other wrecked B-17s. At that time, the repaired B-17D was nicknamed "The Swoose" by 19th Bomb Group pilot, Captain Weldon Smith. The tail of a Boeing B-17D, AAF Ser. No. 40-3091 was grafted onto 40-3097, resulting in a hybrid B-17D. The bomber became "half swan and half goose" just like the lyrics in the then-popular novelty song "Alexander, The Swoose." He flew a record number of missions for a B-17 Before the end of the war, "The Swoose" was scheduled to be scrapped and melted down for its aluminium content. Kurtz then convinced the City of Los Angeles to retrieve his by-then famous bomber for use as a World War II memorial: It was the only B-17 that flew from the beginning of World War II until the end. Today, "The Swoose" is the oldest surviving B-17 and the only early "D" model still in existence. It is located at the National Museum of the United States Air Force at Wright-Patterson Air Force Base in Fairborn, Ohio, for restoration work to enable future display.

After 24 years in the service of the United States Armed Forces (U.S. Army Air Corps, U.S. Army Air Forces, and the U.S. Air Force), Kurtz retired and became a top executive at the William May Garland development firm.

== Personal life ==
Kurtz married Margret "Margo" Rogers and had one child, actress Swoosie Kurtz (born 1944). His daughter's first name "Swoosie" (rhymes with Lucy, rather than woozy) is derived from his two B-17s named "The Swoose" and "Swoose II", which he piloted with the 19th and 463rd Bomb Groups.

Kurtz died in 1996 from complications following a fall. In 2012, he was inducted into the International Swimming Hall of Fame. He served as President of the SoCal Olympians from 1976-1977, and as president of the national Olympian alumni association, the United States Olympians, from 1978-1982. He was succeeded as national president by Dorothy Langkop, a speed skater who competed in 1932 in Lake Placid, and was head of the Texas Olympians. There is a memoir titled "My Rival, The Sky. A Memoir of the Home Front", written by Margo Kurtz. Her book details the life of her husband Frank, his experiences as an Olympic diver and aviator, and their relationship. Swoosie Kurtz also published a memoir, "Part Swan, Part Goose."

== See also ==
- List of members of the International Swimming Hall of Fame
- List of University of Southern California people
