= Doris Grimes =

British diver

Personal information
- Full name: Doris Emmie Grimes
- Nationality: British
- Born: 1 January 1909; Wandsworth, Greater London, England
- Died: 27 June 1987 (aged 78); Arundel, West Sussex, England

Sport
- Country: Great Britain
- Sport: Diving

Doris Emmie Grimes (1 January 1909 – 27 June 1987) was a British diver. She competed in the women's 10 metre platform event at the 1928 Summer Olympics.
