= Diving at the 1924 Summer Olympics – Women's 10 metre platform =

Women's 10 metre platform at the Games of the VIII Olympiad
- Venue: Swimming Stadium Tourelles
- Dates: 19 July (semifinals); 20 July (final)
- Competitors: 11 from 6 nations

Medalists
1st place, gold medalist(s)		Caroline Smith	United States
2nd place, silver medalist(s)		Elizabeth Becker	United States
3rd place, bronze medalist(s)		Hjördis Töpel	Sweden

The women's 10 metre platform, also reported as plongeons de haut vol ordinaires (English: regular high diving), was one of five diving events on the diving at the 1924 Summer Olympics programme. It was actually held from both 10 metre and 5 metre platforms. The competitors performed four compulsory dives. The competition was held on Saturday 19 July 1924, and Sunday 20 July 1924. Eleven divers from six nations competed.

== Results ==
=== First round ===
The three divers who scored the smallest number of points in each group of the first round advanced to the final.

==== Group 1 ====
Rank	Diver	Nation	Points	Score	Notes
1	Elizabeth Becker-Pinkston	United States	11	161	Q
2	Hjördis Töpel	Sweden	11.5	159	Q
3	Helen Meany	United States	16.5	152	Q
4	Verrall Newman	Great Britain	18	154	
5	Eva Olliwier	Sweden	20.5	148	
6	Beatrice Armstrong	Great Britain	27.5	141	

==== Group 2 ====
Rank	Diver	Nation	Points	Score	Notes
1	Caroline Smith	United States	5.5	160	Q
2	Isabelle White	Great Britain	9.5	150	Q
3	Edith Nielsen	Denmark	18.5	128	Q
4	Margarete Adler	Austria	19.5	125	
5	Sophie Hennebert	Belgium	22	118	

=== Final ===
Rank	Diver	Nation	Points	Score
1st place, gold medalist(s)	Caroline Smith	United States	10.5	167
2nd place, silver medalist(s)	Elizabeth Becker-Pinkston	United States	11	166
3rd place, bronze medalist(s)	Hjördis Töpel	Sweden	15.5	164
4	Edith Nielsen	Denmark	17.5	157
5	Helen Meany	United States	22	148
6	Isabelle White	Great Britain	28.5	140
