= Margret Borgs =

German diver

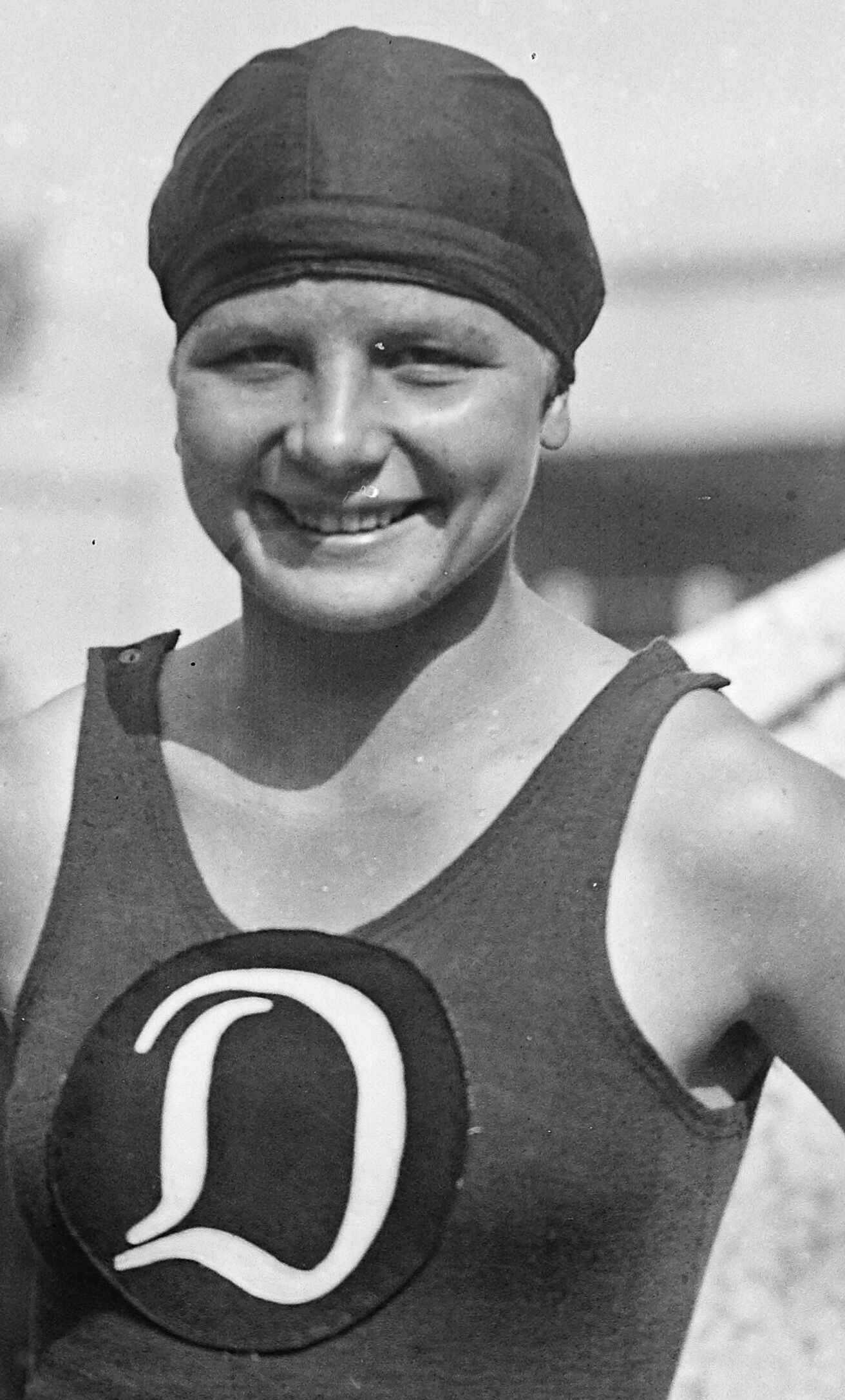
- Margret Borgs in 1928

Personal information
- Born: 17 February 1909 Emmerich am Rhein, Germany
- Died: 4 May 1993 (aged 84) Vienna, Austria

Sport
- Sport: Diving

Margret Borgs (later Mund, 17 February 1909 – 4 May 1993) was a German diver who competed in the 1928 Summer Olympics. She was the wife of Arthur Mund who also represented Germany at the 1928 Olympics in diving. Their son Günther Mund and daughter Lilo Mund were also Olympic divers, who both competed for Chile.

In 1928 she finished fifth in the 3 metre springboard event. In the 10 metre platform competition she was eliminated in the first round.
