= Fumio Takashina =

Japanese diver

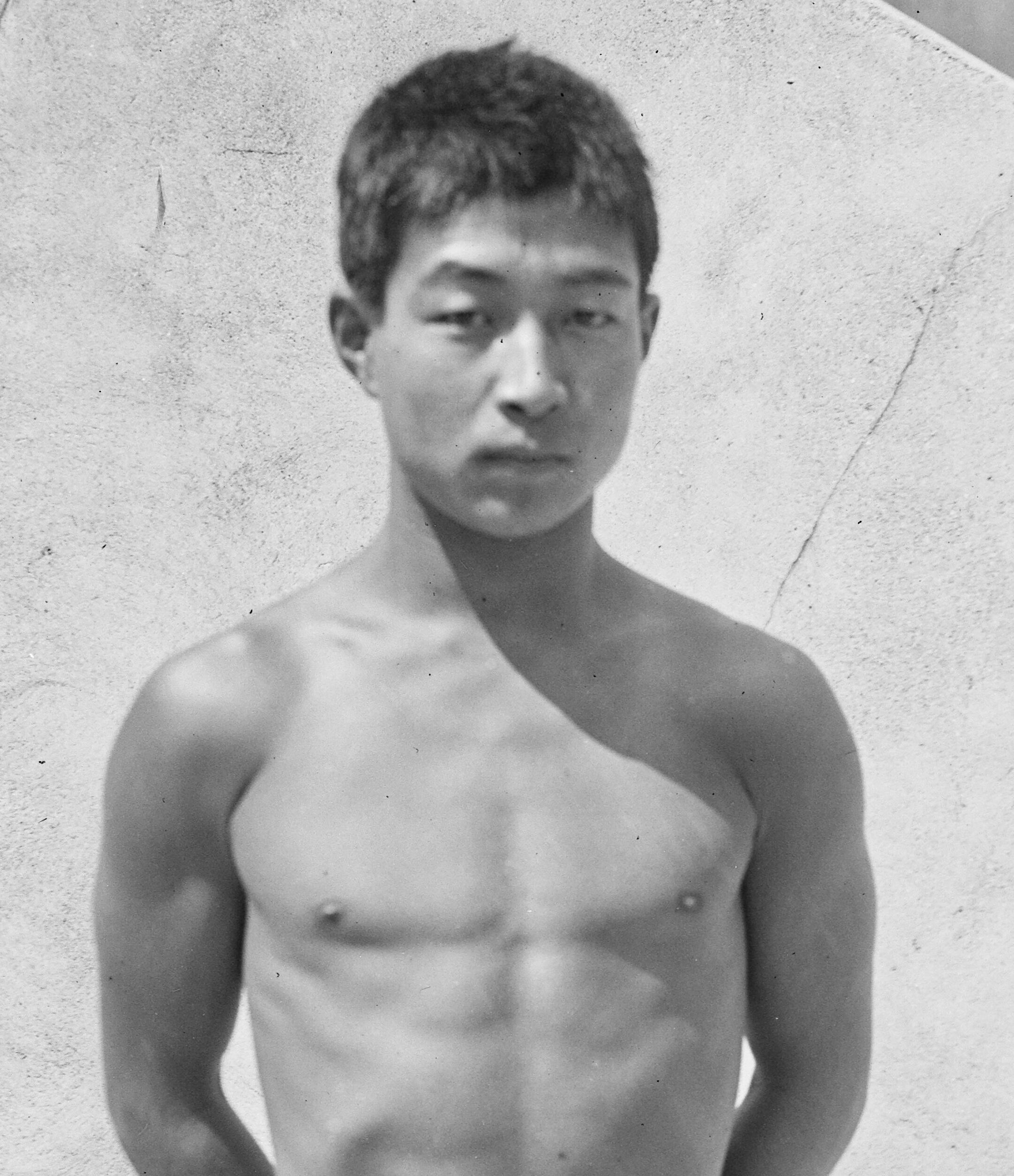

Personal information
- Nationality: Japanese
- Born: 1911

Sport
- Sport: Diving

Fumio Takashina (高階富士夫, Takashina Fumio; born 1911, date of death unknown) was a Japanese diver. He competed in the men's 3 metre springboard event at the 1928 Summer Olympics.
