= Ezio Selva =

Italian diver (1902–1957)

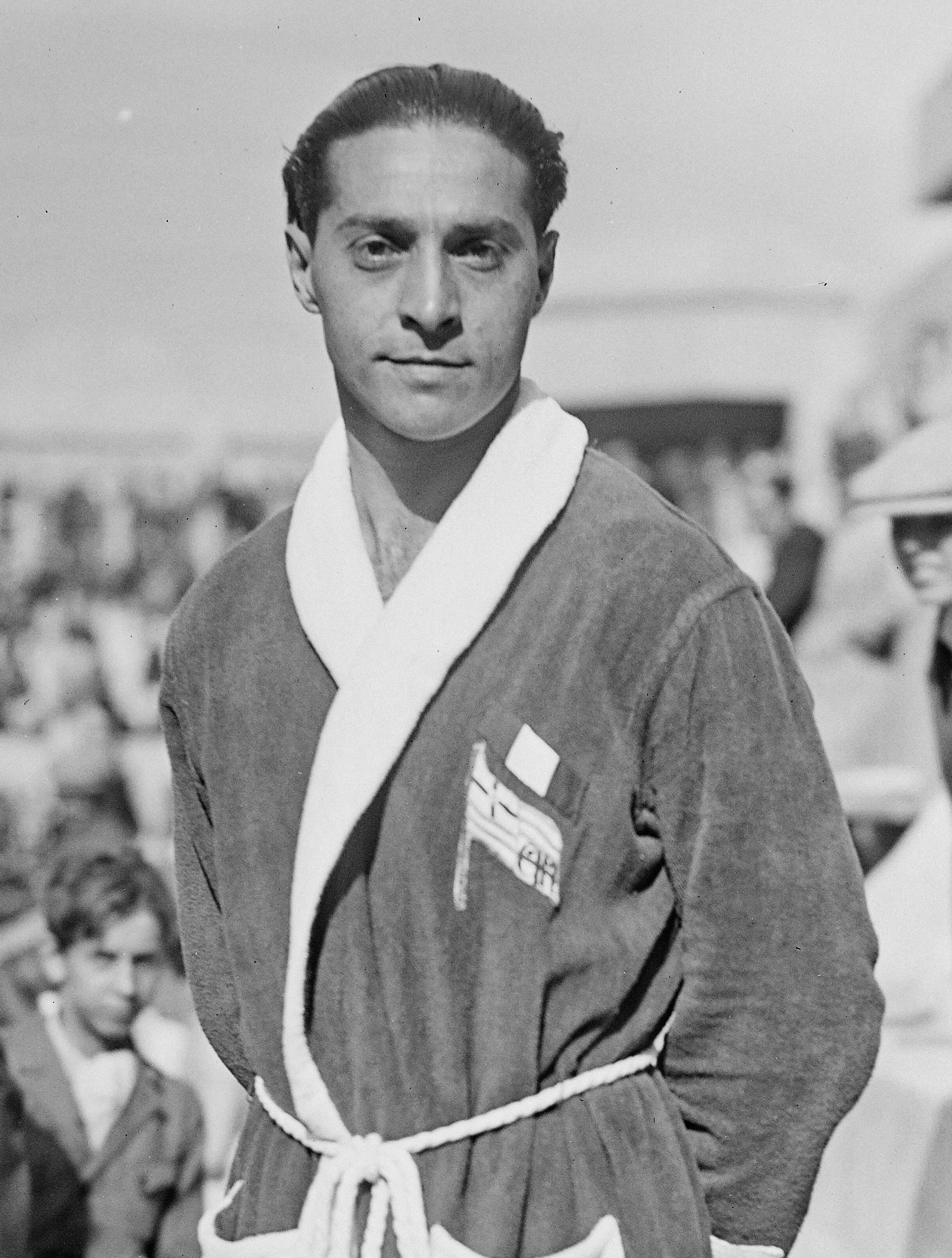
- Ezio Selva in 1928

Personal information
- Nationality: Italian
- Born: 20 March 1902 Locarno, Switzerland
- Died: 29 December 1957 (aged 54) Miami Beach, Florida, United States

Sport
- Sport: Diving
Medal record
Men's diving
Representing Italy
European Championships
Bronze medal – third place	1927 Bologna	Platform

Ezio Selva (20 March 1902 – 29 December 1957) was an Italian diver. He competed in the men's 10 metre platform event at the 1928 Summer Olympics. Selva was also a powerboat racer, and was killed in a race at Miami Beach.
