= Louis Gompers =

Dutch diver

Personal information
- Nickname: Lou Gompers
- National team: Netherlands at 1928 Olympics
- Born: 5 March 1902 Amsterdam, Netherlands
- Died: 22 October 1981 (aged 79) Los Angeles, California, US
- Spouse: Sara/Sonny Sturhoofd
- Children: Lody Gompers; Frieda van Bergen
- Parents: Elias Gompers (father); Esther Wessel (mother)

Sport
- Sport: Diving
- Club: Het IJ, Amsterdam

Achievements and titles
- National finals: bronze in 1927, 1930, and 1940

Louis "Lou" Gompers (5 March 1902 – 22 October 1981) was a Dutch diver and Dutch-American business professional, originally in leatherware. He competed in the men's 3 metre springboard event at the 1928 Summer Olympics.

== Early life ==
Louis Gompers was born in Amsterdam to Elias Gompers and to Esther Wessel. He had a brother Bernard who was born 1907. Bernard, his wife and children, and their father Elias were murdered in the Holocaust. Their mother Esther died in 1942.

== Diving career ==
On 1919, Gompers ended third place in the winter tournament of Het IJ, behind W.A. Frings and J. Veldhof. In the summer of 1920, he ended first, ahead of W.A. Frings. For his dives in both tournaments, Gompers received raving reviews in the Algemeen Handelsblad.

In the 1927 national championships, Gomperts ended third behind Henk Lotgering and Joop Stotijn. Early 1928, Gompers won the International Het IJ Games in diving, ahead of E. Davidson.

In the 1928 Olympic qualifying games in Utrecht, Gompers came second after Lotgering and ahead of Stotijn. At the Olympic Games of 1928, Gompers and fellow IJ-teammate Henk Lotgering represented the Netherlands in the 1-3 meters jumps, yet did not make it to beyond the first round. Among the two, Gompers gained a higher ranking and score, while Lotgering collected more points. [Lotegering and Davidson competed in the 5-10 meter jumps.]

In 1929, Gompers dived to the first place in the International Zian Swim Competition in The Hague, ahead of Zian member Joop Stotijn. In the 1930 Dutch national championships, Louis Gompers won bronze with 104 points, behind Joop Stotijn (139 points) and Henk Lotgering (125).

Gompers and Lotgering made a surprise comeback in 1940, when Gompers dived after many years of absence to the third place in the Dutch national championships. Henk Lotgering won, Piet Koppelle was runner-up.

== Personal and death ==
On 9 August 1927 Louis Gompers married Sara "Sonny" Sturhoofd, later an interior designer, daughter of Jacobus Sturhoofd and Esther Loonstein. Lou was active in the Dutch Red Cross and served in the military campaign of 1940 to defend the Netherlands at Nazi Germany's invasion.

During the Holocaust, Lou and Sonny managed to hide in Doorn and Zeist, where Lou was active in and assisted by the underground. He was arrested near the end of the war. After the war they moved back to Amsterdam, and adopted two Holocaust orphans (the twins Lody and Frieda van Bergen).

In the early 1950s they immigrated to the US. In California they engaged in trade and filed a patent in 1970. Lou Gompers died in 1981, Sonny in 1995, their son Lody in 2023.
