= Karl Schumm =

German diver

Personal information
- Born: 16 April 1899 Cologne, German Empire
- Died: 12 December 1962 (aged 63) Cologne, West Germany

Sport
- Sport: Diving

Karl Schumm (16 April 1899 – 12 December 1962) was a German diver who competed in the 1928 Summer Olympics. In 1928 he finished sixth in the 10 metre platform event.
