= Yrjö Lampila =

Finnish diver

Personal information
- Nationality: Finnish
- Born: 23 April 1901; Helsinki, Finland
- Died: 18 October 1963 (aged 62); Helsinki, Finland

Sport
- Sport: Diving

Yrjö Lampila (23 April 1901 – 18 October 1963) was a Finnish diver. He competed in the men's 10 metre platform event at the 1928 Summer Olympics.
