= Carlos Curiel =

Mexican diver

Personal information
- Born: April 30, 1913; Monterrey, Mexico

Sport
- Sport: Diving

Carlos Félix Curiel Galván (born 30 April 1913, date of death unknown) was a Mexican diver who competed in the 1932 Summer Olympics. He was born in Monterrey. In 1932 he finished fifth in the 10 metre platform event.
