= Edith Nielsen =

Danish diver

Personal information
- Born: May 12, 1906 Copenhagen, Denmark
- Died: November 23, 1994 (aged 88) Copenhagen, Denmark

Sport
- Sport: Diving

Edith Nancy Sophie Bechmann Nielsen (later Scheffler, 12 May 1906 – 23 November 1994) was a Danish diver who competed in the 1924 and 1928 Summer Olympics. In 1924 she finished fourth in the 10 metre platform competition. Four years later she was eliminated in the first round of the 10 metre platform event.
