= Abdel Moneim Mokhtar =

Egyptian diver (1905–1983)

Personal information
- Nationality: Egyptian
- Born: July 1905
- Died: 27 May 1983 (aged 77)

Sport
- Sport: Diving

Abdel Moneim Mokhtar (July 1905 – 27 May 1983) was an Egyptian diver. He competed in the men's 10 metre platform event at the 1928 Summer Olympics. Primarily a gymnast, he switched to diving at the Games upon being told that he needed to be part of a team to compete in the gymnastics tournament. He later had a radio show in Cairo and was the head of several national sporting bodies.

== Early life ==
Mokhtar was born in July 1905. He took up gymnastics in primary school and continued this pursuit at the El Saidia Secondary School for Boys in Giza.

== Career ==
Mokhtar became the Egyptian secondary school gymnastic champion in 1923 and defended his title for the next four years. In 1927, he was selected by the Ministry of Information to head a yearly Egyptian gymnastics festival. The event's royal patronage put him into contact with Prince Omar Toussoun, who at the time was the head of the Egyptian Olympic Committee. This led to his selection to represent Egypt at the 1928 Summer Olympics but, upon arrival in Amsterdam, he was told that he could not compete in the tournament as the lone member of an Egyptian gymnastics team. He therefore entered the diving tournament, which also featured fellow Egyptian and upcoming medalist Farid Simaika, and took part in the men's 10 metre platform event, where he was sixth in his group and did not advance to the final.

In 1930, Mokhtar travelled to England to further his studies of physical education, and followed this up with a journey to Germany in 1931. He returned to Egypt in 1932 and established a rowing club in the Agouza neighborhood of Giza, which was the first in the region.

== Later life ==
In the 1930s, Mokhtar had a radio broadcast in Cairo that covered topics related to fitness. In his later years, he also served as the head of several national bodies relating to the promotion and administration of sport. He died 27 May 1983, at the age of 77.
