= Greta Onnela =

Finnish diver

Personal information
- Full name: Greta Naemi Onnela
- Nationality: Finnish
- Born: 23 August 1910; Vaasa, Finland
- Died: 10 August 1957 (aged 46); Vaasa, Finland

Sport
- Sport: Diving

Greta Naemi Onnela (23 August 1910 – 10 August 1957) was a Finnish diver. She competed in the women's 10 metre platform event at the 1928 Summer Olympics and placed fifth.
