= Catharina Hesterman =

Dutch diver (1902–1982)

Personal information
- Nationality: Dutch
- Born: 17 September 1902; Amsterdam, Netherlands
- Died: 17 July 1982 (aged 79); Amstelveen, Netherlands

Sport
- Sport: Diving

Catharina Hesterman (17 September 1902 – 17 July 1982) was a Dutch diver. She competed in the women's 3 metre springboard event at the 1928 Summer Olympics. She finished tenth, with a total of 48.20 points.
