= Diving at the 1932 Summer Olympics – Men's 10 metre platform =

Men's 10 metre platform at the Games of the X Olympiad

Medalists
1st place, gold medalist(s)		Harold Smith	United States
2nd place, silver medalist(s)		Michael Galitzen	United States
3rd place, bronze medalist(s)		Frank Kurtz	United States

The men's 10 metre platform, also reported as high diving, was one of four diving events on the diving at the 1932 Summer Olympics programme. The competition was actually held from both 10 metre and 5 metre platforms. Divers performed four compulsory dives – running plain header forward, standing backward spring and forward somersault with pike (10 metre), standing straight Isander (half gainer), standing double somersault backward with tuck (5 metre) – and four dives of the competitor's choice (different from the compulsory) for a total of eight dives. The competition was held on Saturday 13 August 1932. Eight divers from five nations competed.

== Results ==
Since there were only eight entries, instead of groups, a direct final was contested.

Rank	Diver	Nation	Score
1st place, gold medalist(s)	Harold Smith	United States	124.80
2nd place, silver medalist(s)	Michael Galitzen	United States	124.28
3rd place, bronze medalist(s)	Frank Kurtz	United States	121.98
4	Josef Staudinger	Austria	103.44
5	Carlos Curiel	Mexico	83.82
6	Jesús Flores	Mexico	77.94
7	Alfred Phillips	Canada	77.10
8	Hidekatsu Ishida	Japan	75.92
