= Verrall Newman =

British diver

Personal information
- Nationality: British
- Born: 21 January 1897; Hampstead, England
- Died: 7 October 1987 (aged 90); Honiton, England

Sport
- Sport: Diving

Verrall Newman (21 January 1897 – 7 October 1987) was a British diver. She competed in the women's 10 metre platform event at the 1924 Summer Olympics.

In March 2022 a variety of her sporting medals, still in the possession of her family, were shown on the BBC Television programme Antiques Roadshow.
