= Kathleen Le Rossignol =

British diver

Personal information
- Nationality: British
- Born: 22 July 1908 Saint Helier, Jersey
- Died: 6 March 2001 (aged 92)

Sport
- Sport: Diving

Kathleen Le Rossignol (22 July 1908 – 6 March 2001) was a British diver. She competed in the women's 10 metre platform event at the 1928 Summer Olympics.
