= Gösta Horn =

Swedish diver

Personal information
- Nationality: Swedish
- Born: 24 January 1907 Eskilstuna, Sweden
- Died: 10 December 1943 (aged 36) Baltic Sea, near Öland, Sweden

Sport
- Sport: Diving

Gösta Horn (24 January 1907 – 10 December 1943) was a Swedish diver. He competed in the men's 10 metre platform event at the 1928 Summer Olympics. He died on 10 December 1943 when the military plane he was travelling on crashed into the sea off the coast off Öland.
