= Jesús Flores (diver) =

Mexican diver

Personal information
- Born: December 14, 1912; Monterrey, Mexico

Sport
- Sport: Diving

Jesús Flores Alba (born December 14, 1912, date of death unknown) is a Mexican diver who competed in the 1932 Summer Olympics and in the 1936 Summer Olympics. He was born in Monterrey.

In 1932 he finished sixth in the 10 metre platform event. Four years later he finished 24th in the 10 metre platform competition.
