= Mohamed Rostam =

Egyptian footballer

Personal information
- Full name: Mohamed Ali Rostam

International career
Years	Team	Apps	(Gls)
- Egypt

Mohamed Ali Rostam was an Egyptian footballer. He competed in the men's tournament at the 1928 Summer Olympics.
