= Anni Rehborn =

German swimmer (1904–1986)

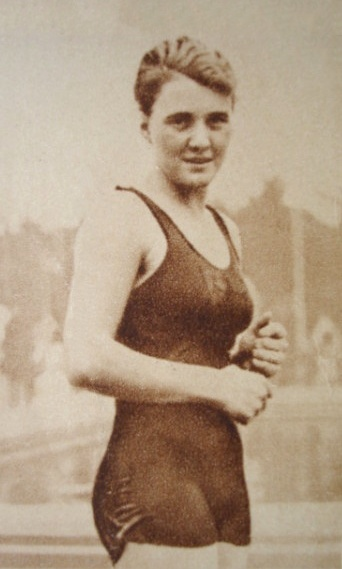
- Anni Rehborn c. 1932

Personal information
- Born: 25 August 1904 Bochum, German Empire
- Died: 15 January 1986 (aged 81) Essen, North Rhine-Westphalia, West Germany

Sport
- Sport: Swimming
- Club: SV Bochum
Medal record
Swimming
Representing Germany
European Championships
Bronze medal – third place	1927 Bologna	4×100 m freestyle

Anni Rehborn (25 August 1904 – 15 January 1986) was a German swimmer who won a bronze medal in the 4 × 100 m freestyle relay at the 1927 European Aquatics Championships. She entered two swimming events at the 1928 Summer Olympics, but did not compete for unknown reasons. During her career she won eight national titles in the 100 m backstroke (1923–1925, 1927–1929) and 100 m freestyle events (1923–1924).

== Family ==
Rehborn joined the Nazi Party in 1932.

Rehborn was the wife of Karl Brandt, one of Adolf Hitler's personal physicians. The two married on 17 March 1934. The couple had only one child, Karl Adolf Brandt, born 4 October 1935. With her husband a part of Hitler's inner circle, Rehborn became close friends with both Eva Braun and Margarete Speer, wife of Albert Speer. Karl Brandt led the Action T4 euthanasia programme started by a decree from Hitler in September 1939, in which disabled patients were executed by the regime. Karl Brandt was tried for crimes against humanity at the Doctors' Trial, found guilty and executed by hanging in 1948.

Her elder brother Julius and sister Hanni were Olympic divers.
