= Mohamed Charaoui =

Egyptian fencer

Personal information
- Born: 1906

Sport
- Sport: Fencing

Mohamed Charaoui (born 1906, date of death unknown) was an Egyptian fencer. He competed in the team épée and individual sabre events at the 1928 Summer Olympics.
