= Moussa El-Ezam =

Egyptian footballer (died 1960)

Personal information
- Date of death: 1960
- Place of death: Cairo, Egypt

International career
Years	Team	Apps	(Gls)
- Egypt

Moussa El-Ezam (Arabic: مُوسَى الْعَظْم; died 1960) was an Egyptian footballer. He competed in the men's tournament at the 1928 Summer Olympics.
