= Eugen Ahnström =

Swedish diver

Personal information
- Nationality: Sweden
- Born: 28 September 1904; Stockholm, Sweden
- Died: 17 February 1974 (aged 69); Enskede, Sweden

Sport
- Sport: Diving

Eugen Nikolaus Ahnström (28 September 1904 – 17 February 1974) was a Swedish diver. He competed in the 1928 Summer Olympics.
