= Michael Galitzen =

American diver (1909–1959)

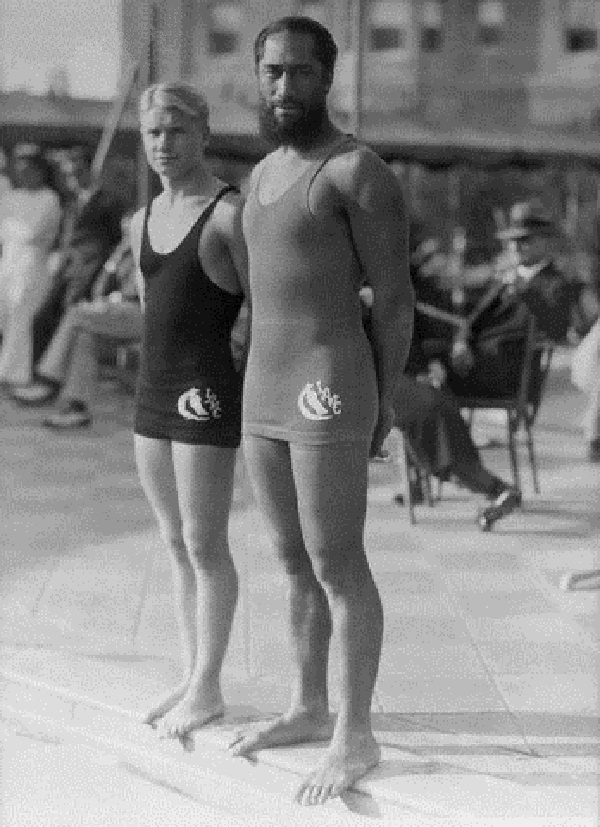
- Riley and Duke Kahanamoku in 1927.

Personal information
- Born: September 6, 1909 Los Angeles, California
- Died: June 6, 1959 (aged 49) Hollywood, California
Medal record
Men's diving
Representing the United States
| Gold medal – first place | 1932 Los Angeles | 3 m springboard |
| Silver medal – second place | 1928 Amsterdam | 3 m springboard |
| Silver medal – second place | 1932 Los Angeles | 10 m platform |
| Bronze medal – third place | 1928 Amsterdam | 10 m platform |

Michael Riley Galitzen, also known as Mickey Riley (September 6, 1909, Los Angeles, California – June 6, 1959, Hollywood, California) was an American diver who won four total medals, one gold, at the 1928 Summer Olympics and 1932 Summer Olympics.

Galitzen won acclaim both for his individual diving and as a tandem diver with his brother John. He won two medals in diving at Amsterdam in 1928 as Michael Galitzen. In 1931 his coach suggested that the brothers use Americanized stage names — "Mickey Riley" and "Johnny Riley". He won gold and silver medals in Los Angeles in 1932 under that name. After the Olympics, he worked as a film editor, and he and John appeared frequently in diving shows. He was found dead in his Hollywood apartment in 1959; the death was attributed to natural causes.

Galitzen was inducted into the International Swimming Hall of Fame in 1977.
