= Abdel Hamid Hamdi =

Egyptian footballer

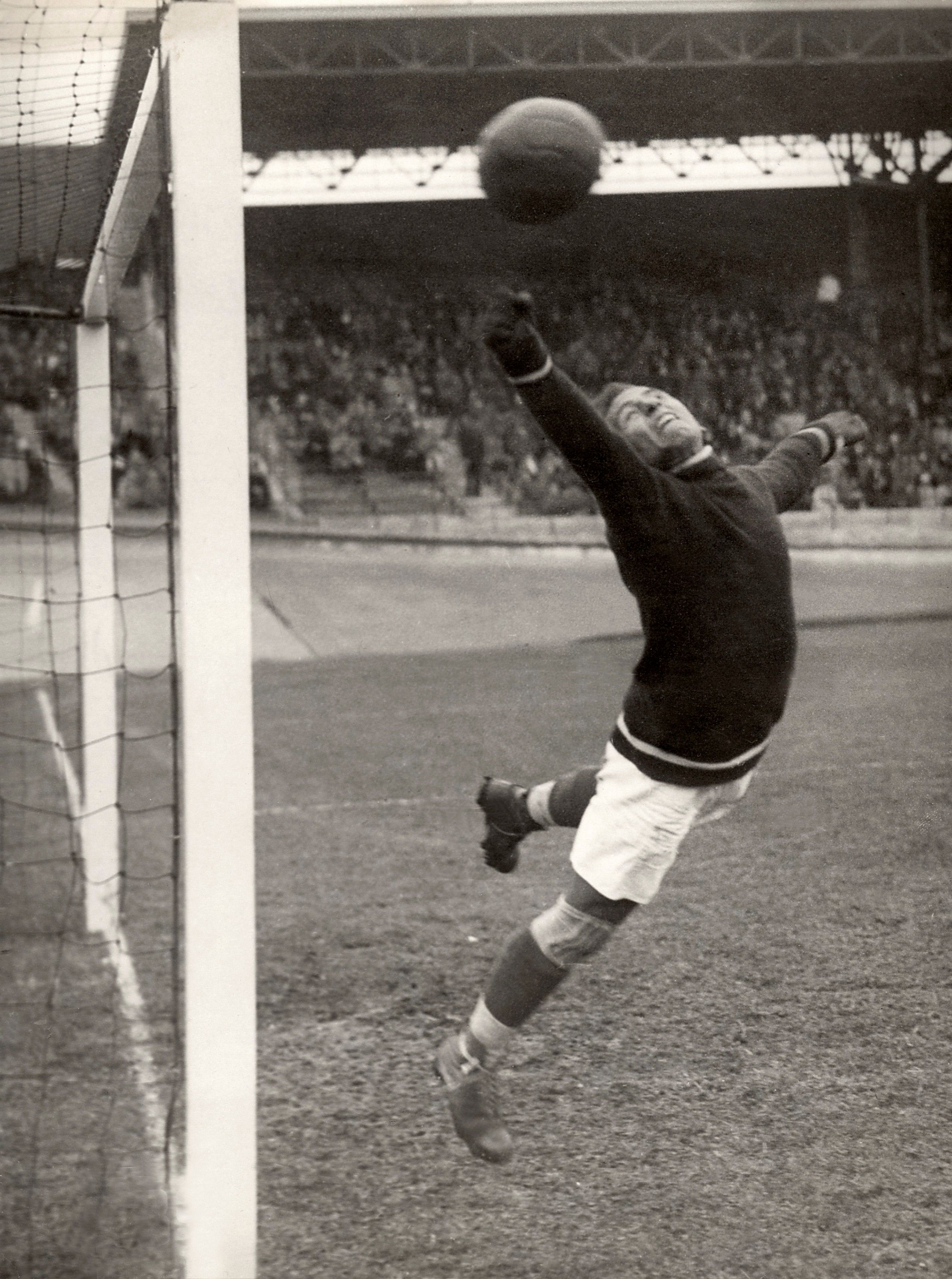

Senior career*
Years	Team	Apps	(Gls)
- Al Ahly

International career
- Egypt
- * Club domestic league appearances and goals

Abdel Hamid Hamdi was an Egyptian footballer. He competed in the men's tournament at the 1928 Summer Olympics. Hamdi is deceased.
