= Lala Sjöqvist =

Swedish diver

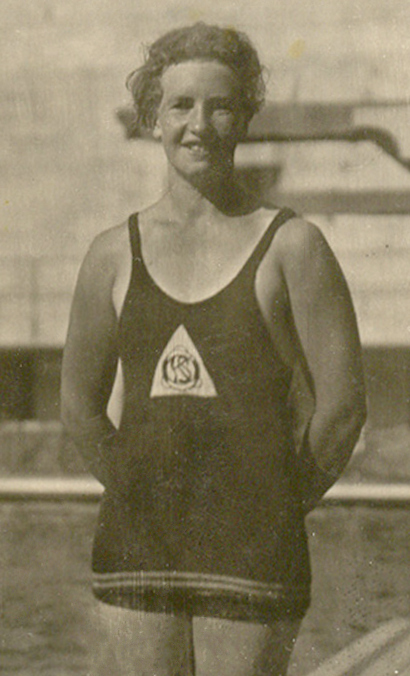

Personal information
- Born: 23 September 1903 Nybro, Kalmar, Sweden
- Died: 8 August 1964 (aged 60) Rockneby, Kalmar, Sweden

Sport
- Sport: Diving
- Club: Kalmar SS
Medal record
Representing Sweden
Olympic Games
Bronze medal – third place	1928 Amsterdam	10 m platform

Lala Valborg Sjöqvist (also Sjöquist, later Larsson, 23 September 1903 – 8 August 1964) was a Swedish diver who won the bronze medal in the 10 m platform event at the 1928 Olympics. Her younger sister Ingeborg was also an Olympic diver, competing for Sweden in the platform at the 1932 and 1936 Games.
