= Hanni Rehborn =

German diver

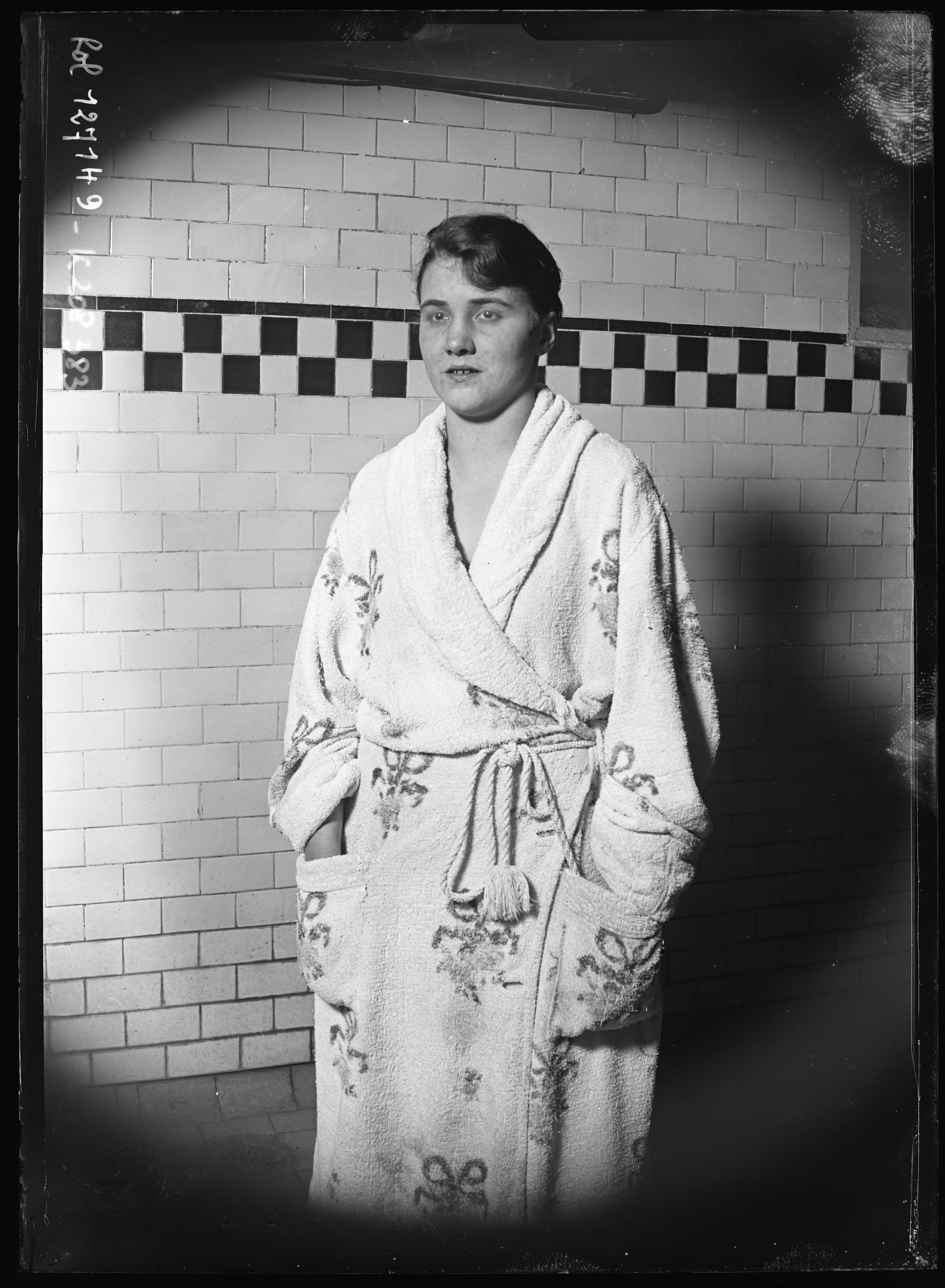
- Hanni Rehborn in France in 1928

Personal information
- Born: November 20, 1907 Bochum, Germany
- Died: November 30, 1987 (aged 80) Essen, West Germany

Sport
- Sport: Diving
Medal record
Representing Germany
European Championships
Bronze medal – third place	1927 Bologna	3 m springboard

Margrete Emma Johanne "Hanni" Rehborn (20 November 1907 – 30 November 1987) was a German diver who competed in the 1928 Summer Olympics. She finished sixth in the 10 metre platform event. Her elder brother, Julius, was also an Olympic diver and her sister, Anni, was also nominated for the 1928 Summer Olympics, but did not participate for unknown reasons.
