= Julius Rehborn =

German diver

Personal information
- Born: December 30, 1899; Langenberg, Westphalia, German Empire
- Died: November 27, 1987 (aged 87); Ulm, West Germany

Sport
- Sport: Diving

Karl Julius Rehborn (30 December 1899 – 27 November 1987) was a German diver who competed in the 1928 Summer Olympics. He finished ninth in the 10 metre platform event. His younger sisters were also Olympic athletes: Hanni was a diver and Anni a swimmer. He and Hanni died just three days apart.
