= Lilo Mund =

Chilean diver

Personal information
- Full name: Lilo Mund Borgs
- Born: 1939 (age 86–87) Santiago, Chile

Sport
- Sport: Diving

Lilo Mund Borgs (Note: In this Spanish name, the first or paternal surname is Mund and the second or maternal family name is Borgs.) (born 1939) is a Chilean former Olympic diver. She competed in the women's 3 metre springboard event at the 1956 Summer Olympics.

Her brother Günther Mund was also a Chilean Olympic diver. Both of Mund's parents, Arthur Mund and Margret Borgs, competing for Germany at the 1928 Summer Olympics.
