= Arthur Munds =

English cricketer

Arthur Edward Munds (20 January 1870−19 July 1940) was an English cricketer. He was a left-handed batsman and a left-arm medium-pace bowler who played for Kent County Cricket Club. Munds was born at Lydd in Kent in 1870 and died at High Wycombe in Buckinghamshire aged 70 in 1940.

Munds made a single first-class cricket appearance during 1896, having previously made two appearances for Kent's Second XI. He scored ten runs and bowled five over without taking a wicket in the match.

Munds' father, Edward, was groundsman at Hythe Cricket Club for 47 years and his brother, Raymond, made seven appearances for the Kent team in the early 20th century.

== Bibliography ==
- Carlaw, Derek (2020). Kent County Cricketers, A to Z: Part One (1806–1914) (PDF). Cardiff: ACS.
