= Hussein Moukhtar =

Egyptian weightlifter

Personal information
- Nationality: Egyptian
- Born: 10 January 1905 Dumyat, Egypt
- Died: April 1966

Sport
- Sport: Weightlifting

Hussein Moukhtar (10 January 1905 – April 1966) was an Egyptian weightlifter. He competed at the 1928 Summer Olympics and the 1936 Summer Olympics.
