= Gamil El-Zobair =

Egyptian footballer (born 1983)

Personal information
- Place of birth: Sudan
- Date of death: 2 September 1983
- Place of death: Cairo, Egypt

Senior career*
Years	Team	Apps	(Gls)
1924–1931	Al Ahly		
1931–1934	Zamalek		

International career
- Egypt
- * Club domestic league appearances and goals

Mohamed Gamil El-Zobair (date of birth unknown; died 2 September 1983) was an Egyptian footballer. He competed in the men's tournament at the 1928 Summer Olympics.
