= Raymond Munds =

English cricketer

Personal information
- Full name: Raymond Munds
- Born: 28 December 1882; Lydd, Kent
- Died: 29 July 1962 (aged 79); Folkestone, Kent
- Batting: Left-handed
- Bowling: Right-arm slow
- Relatives: Arthur Munds (brother)

Domestic team information
- Years: Team
- 1902–1908: Kent

Career statistics
| Competition | First-class |
|---|---|
| Matches | 7 |
| Runs scored | 121 |
| Batting average | 12.10 |
| 100s/50s | 0/0 |
| Top score | 29 |
| Catches/stumpings | 3/− |
- Source: CricInfo, 8 April 2012

Raymond Munds (28 December 1882 – 29 July 1962) was an English professional cricketer who played seven first-class cricket matches for Kent County Cricket Club in the early 20th century. Munds was a left-handed batsman who bowled right-arm slow. He was born at Lydd in Kent.

Munds was a product of Kent's Tonbridge Nursery, the county's development centre for young professionals at Tonbridge, and was considered a promising batsman – scoring 1,416 runs in 1907. He played for the Kent First XI between 1902 and 1908. He played in three County Championship matches, three times against Marylebone Cricket Club (MCC) and once against Cambridge University. He made his debut for Kent in 1902 against MCC and played his final first-class match in 1908 against Cambridge University. He made a number of appearances for the Kent Second XI and MCC in minor matches and for many years for Hythe Cricket Club. His Wisden obituary states that he played as a wicket-keeper but there is no evidence that he did so in first-class matches.

He later stood as an umpire in three first-class fixtures and in nearly 50 Minor Counties Championship matches. He died at Folkestone on 29 July 1962 aged 79. Munds' father was groundsman at Hythe Cricket Club for 47 years and his brother, Arthur, played one first-class match for Kent in 1896.

== Bibliography ==
- Carlaw, Derek (2020). Kent County Cricketers, A to Z: Part One (1806–1914) (PDF). Cardiff: ACS.
