= Günther Mund =

Chilean diver

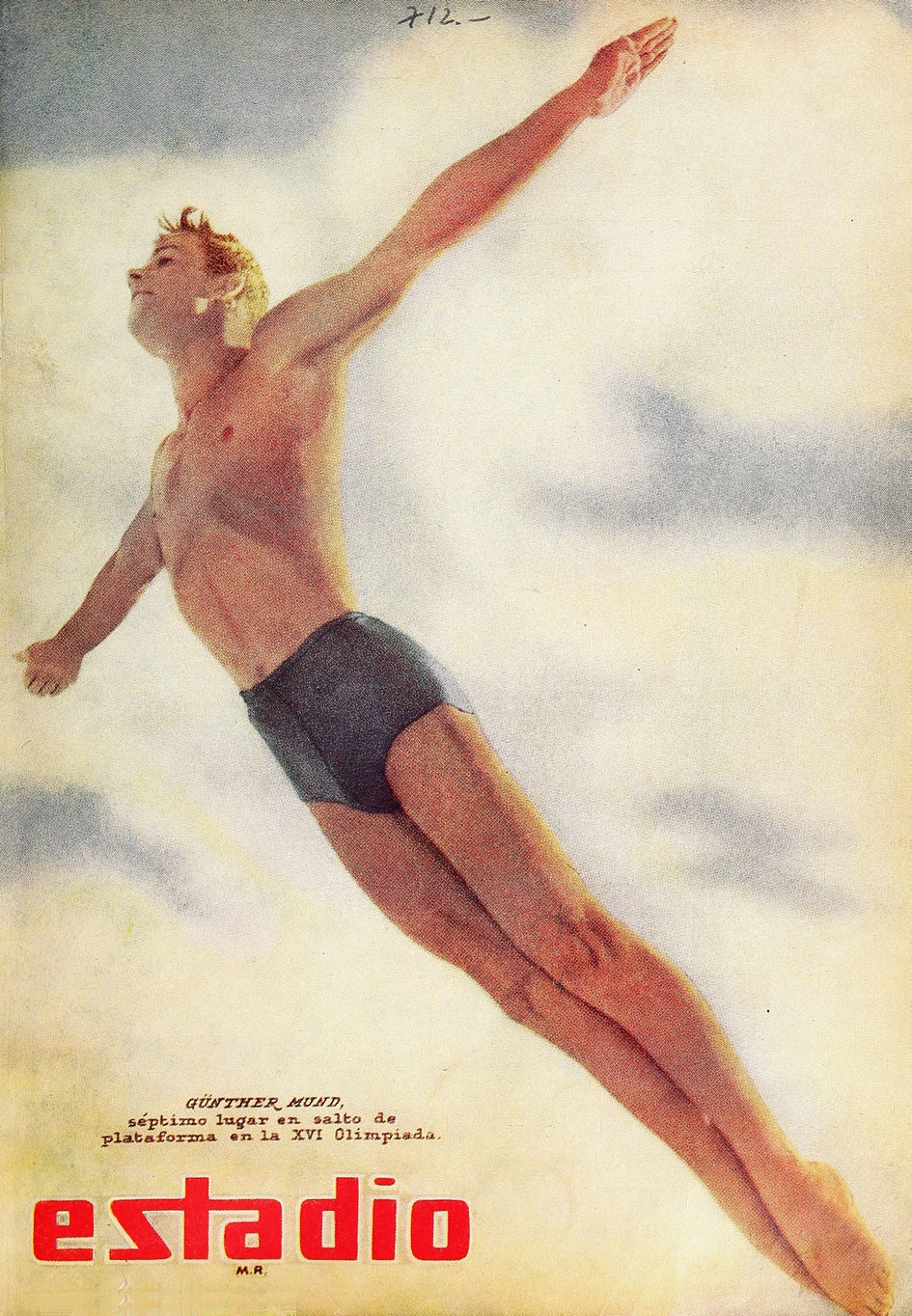

Personal information
- Born: August 7, 1934 Santiago de Chile, Chile
- Died: March 27, 2011 (aged 76) Melipilla, Chile

Sport
- Sport: Diving

Günther Mund Borgs (Note: In this Spanish name, the first or paternal surname is Mund and the second or maternal family name is Borgs.) (August 7, 1934 – March 27, 2011) was a competitive diver who represented Chile at two Olympic Games. At the 1948 Summer Olympics he was 26th in the 3 metre springboard. At the 1956 Summer Olympics he was 7th in the 3 metre springboard and 19th in the 10 metre platform.

His sister is diver Lilo Mund. Mund's parents Arthur Mund and Margret Borgs were also Olympic divers, competing for Germany at the 1928 Summer Olympics. Günther died in a light aircraft accident on March 27, 2011 in Melipilla, Chile.
