= Arthur Mund =

German diver

Personal information
- Born: 10 February 1899 Halberstadt, German Empire
- Died: 14 November 1990 (aged 91)

Sport
- Sport: Diving
Medal record
Representing Germany
European Championships
Gold medal – first place	1926 Budapest	3 m springboard

Arthur Mund (10 February 1899 – 14 November 1990) was a German diver who competed in the 1928 Summer Olympics. He was the husband of Margret Borgs who was also a diver representing Germany at the 1928 Olympics. Their son Günther Mund and daughter Lilo Mund too were Olympic divers, who both competed for Chile. Mund was born in Halberstadt. In 1928 he finished fifth in the 3 metre springboard event.
