= Pete Desjardins =

American diver (1907–1985)

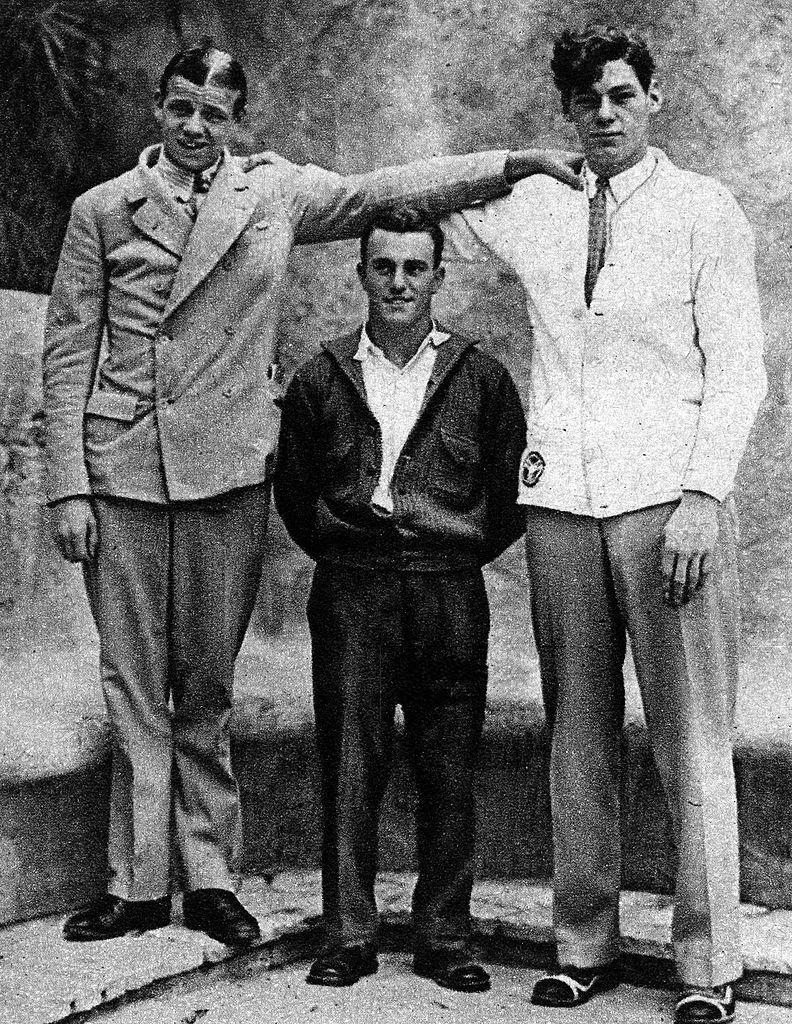
- Desjardins in 1926, flanked by Arne Borg and Johnny Weissmuller

Personal information
- Full name: Ulise Joseph Desjardins
- Born: April 12, 1907 St-Pierre-Jolys, Manitoba, Canada
- Died: May 6, 1985 (aged 78) Miami, Florida, U.S.

Sport
- Sport: Diving
Medal record
Representing United States
Olympic Games
Silver medal – second place	1924 Paris	3 m springboard
Gold medal – first place	1928 Amsterdam	3 m springboard
Gold medal – first place	1928 Amsterdam	10 m platform

Ulise Joseph "Pete" Desjardins (April 12, 1907 – May 6, 1985) was an American diver who competed in the 1924 and 1928 Summer Olympics.

Born in St-Pierre-Jolys, Manitoba, Canada, Desjardins grew up in Florida. In 1924 he won the silver medal in the 3 m springboard competition and finished sixth in the plain high diving event. Four years later, he won gold medals in the 3 meter springboard and 10 meter platform.

At the 1928 Games Desjardins had the maximum score for two of his springboard dives, but his platform gold medal was unexpected. Farid Simaika from Egypt initially won the competition, and the Egyptian anthem was already being played at the award ceremony, when the judges reconsidered their scoring and placed Desjardins first.

Desjardins studied economics at Stanford University and is a member of the Stanford Athletic Hall of Fame, though he never won a collegiate championship. He performed swimming exhibitions in the Billy Rose's Aquacade, together with Johnny Weissmuller, Martha Norelius and Helen Meany, for which he was declared a professional. He continued to appear in the Aquacade until World War II, and later performed in diving shows through the 1960s.

== See also ==
- List of members of the International Swimming Hall of Fame
