= Farid Simaika =

Egyptian diver

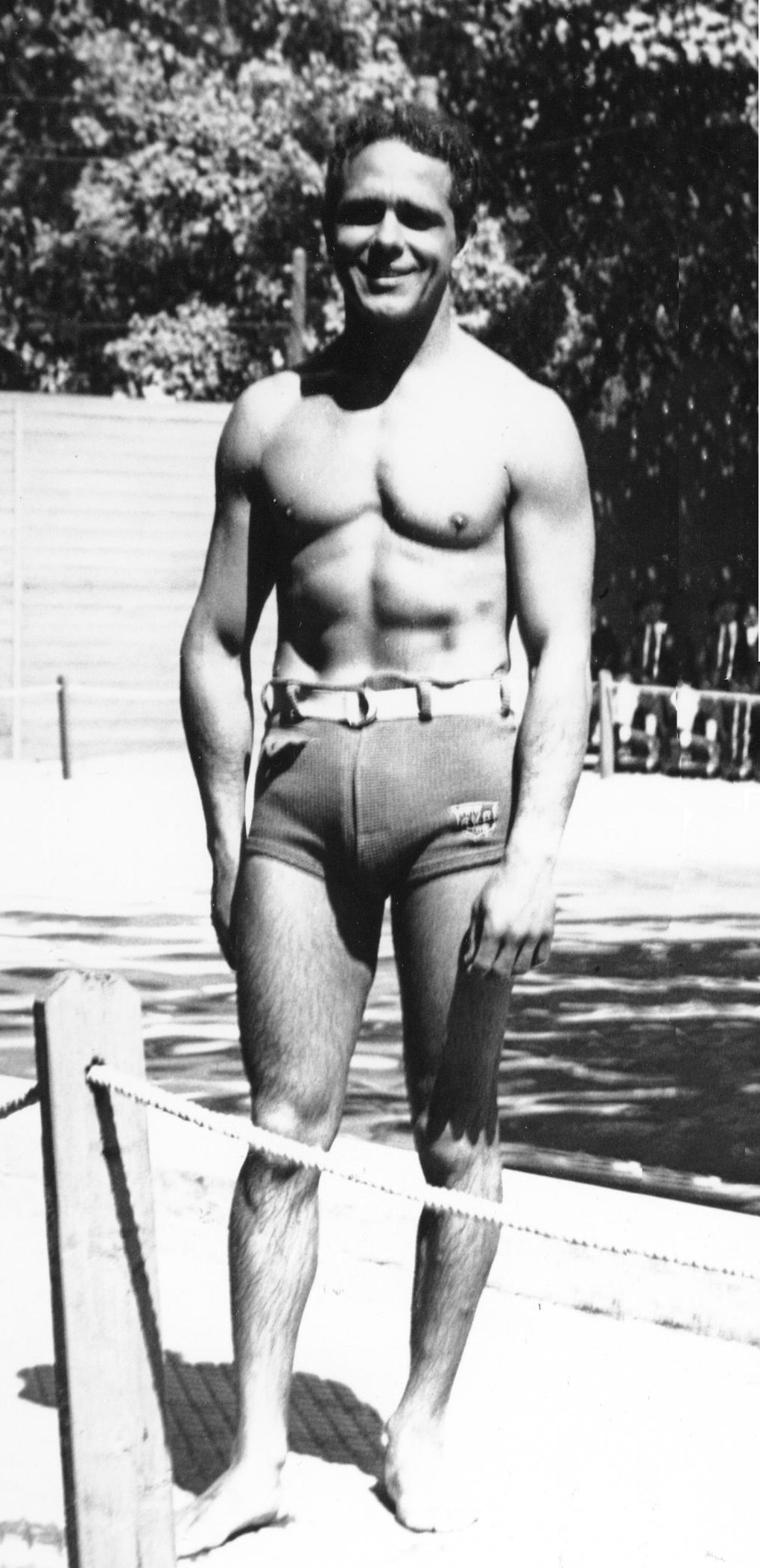

Personal information
- Born: 12 June 1907 Alexandria, Egypt
- Died: 11 September 1943 (aged 36) Makassar, Indonesia

Sport
- Sport: Diving
Medal record
Representing Egypt
Olympic Games
Silver medal – second place	1928 Amsterdam	10 metre platform
Bronze medal – third place	1928 Amsterdam	3 metre springboard

Farid Simaika (Egyptian Arabic: فريد سميكة 12 June 1907 – 11 September 1943) was an Olympic diver who competed for Egypt.

== Early life ==
Simaika was born on 12 June 1907 in Alexandria to one of the oldest Coptic families which can trace their ancestry to the middle of the 17th century. The Simaikas were mostly magistrates and notables who prospered in the service of State and Church. His father, Bassili Bey Simaika, was director of Alexandria customs. Before moving to the United States in the 1920s, Simaika was already a well-known Egyptian diving champion. He also held an Egyptian pilot's license.

== Diving titles ==
In 1927 and representing the Ambassador Swimming Club of Los Angeles, Simaika won the American Amateur Athletic Union (AAU) low board championship and came in second place to Pete Desjardins in the American national fancy high diving competition. He then went on to win the American national fancy high board diving championships in 1930, 1931 and 1932. In 1931, he represented the Hollywood Athletic Club. Simaika's performance in the 1932 American diving championship so impressed the Japanese that they invited him to compete in the Japanese high diving competition held in Tokyo around the year 1932. He won the Japanese title with ease.

== Olympic glory ==
Competing for Egypt at the 1928 Summer Olympics Simaika won the silver medal at platform high diving and the bronze medal at the 3-meter springboard. Simaika's silver medal was controversial, as the judges first announced Simaika the winner, with the Desjardins coming second. While the band played the Egyptian national anthem, it was discovered that Desjardins won the contest.

The Charleston Gazette gives a more detailed account as to why Simaika had his gold medal withdrawn: “The finals in the men's diving saw one of the most curious incidents of the Olympiad. Simaika, the California-trained Egyptian plunger, finished with top points at 99.58, and the Egyptian flag was hoisted and the Egyptian national anthem sung for the first time of the meeting. But soon afterwards it was announced that a majority of the Judges by a vote of 5 to 4 had decided that Desjardins of Miami was the winner with the best general average of points for the eight dives”.

== Later life ==
Having won two Olympic diving medals in addition to four A.A.U. diving titles, Simaika went on to star in the various world's fair water shows from Chicago's Century of Progress to the Billy Rose's Aquacade in Cleveland and New York. In 1934, Simaika and fellow Olympic and A.A.U. diving champion Harold Smith toured the world giving diving exhibitions. During the same year they also toured the US, exhibiting at various local American water carnivals, as part of a national program “to help stimulate interest in swimming and diving”. Simaika also toured Europe diving with his good friend and Olympic nemesis Desjardins. Simaika's high diving act included a blind-folded tandem done with Smith (which they also performed in a Metro Goldwyn Mayer film entitled “Double diving”) and 2-a-day 66-foot tower dives at the Canadian National Exhibition in Toronto. The year 1935 saw Simaika as a “special student” at the University of California at Los Angeles (UCLA) as well as coach of the university's diving team. In fact, The U.S. National Archives and Records Administration lists Simaika's education as “two years of college”.

Simaika appeared in three Hollywood films: he did diving stunts in Seas Beneath (1931) directed by John Ford. He then starred, together with Harold Smith, in Metro Goldwyn Mayer's Double Diving, narrated by Pete Smith (1939). He finally starred in Del Frazier's Water Sports (1941) together with Ruth Nurmi and John Deering.

== Marriages ==
Simaika married Mabel Van Den Akker, Hollywood society girl and daughter of a wealthy Hollywood jeweler in Hollywood on 11 February 1929. They divorced in 1931. In 1935, aged 27, Simaika married Betty J. Wilson. When Simaika and Wilson filed an intention to wed notice, the marriage license bureau initially refused to grant them a marriage license because of doubt whether Simaika was “an Egyptian or a Caucasian”. Existing California laws at the time prevented Caucasians from marrying “those of another race”. After consulting experts, the county counsel's office in Los Angeles (California) ruled on 26 April 1935 that “an Egyptian is of the Caucasian race” and that “Egyptians were of the Hamitic and Semitic branch of the Caucasian race”, thereby removing the racial barrier to their marriage.

== War service and death ==
In March 1942 Simaika received American citizenship, and on 3 August 1942 enlisted in the U.S. Army. The year 1943 saw Simaika training at Lowry Field in Colorado as an assistant intelligence officer of a bombardment group preparing for overseas action. Later that year, he was second lieutenant attached to a bomber unit in the U.S. air corps. It is believed that in 1943 Simaika's plane was shot down over Makassar in South Sulawesi, Indonesia. He was declared dead on 10 December 1945 and listed as missing in action.

Simaika was awarded the Distinguished Flying Cross and was promoted in rank to First lieutenant. In 1982 he was inducted into the International Swimming Hall of Fame. A major road in Cairo's Heliopolis district is named after him.

== See also ==
- List of members of the International Swimming Hall of Fame
