= Sayed Houda =

Egyptian footballer (1900-1985)

Personal information
- Date of birth: 19 November 1900
- Place of birth: Alexandria, Egypt
- Date of death: 8 August 1985 (aged 84)

International career
Years	Team	Apps	(Gls)
- Egypt

Sayed Houda (19 November 1900 – 8 August 1985) was an Egyptian footballer. He competed at the 1924 Summer Olympics and the 1928 Summer Olympics.
