= Hamad Niazi =

Egyptian fencer

Personal information
- Born: 1891
- Died: 1950 (aged 58–59)

Sport
- Sport: Fencing

Hamad Niazi (1891 – 1950) was an Egyptian fencer. He competed in the individual sabre event at the 1928 Summer Olympics.
