= Harold Smith (diver) =

American diver (1909–1958)

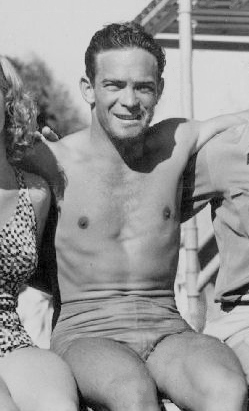
- Smith in 1937

Personal information
- Full name: Edwin Harold Smith
- Born: February 19, 1909 Ontario, California, U.S.
- Died: March 5, 1958 (aged 49) La Jolla, California, U.S.

Sport
- Sport: Diving
- Club: Los Angeles Athletic Club
Medal record
Representing the United States
Olympic Games
Gold medal – first place	1932 Los Angeles	10 m platform
Silver medal – second place	1932 Los Angeles	3 m springboard

Edwin Harold Smith, known informally as Dutch Smith (February 19, 1909 – March 5, 1958), was an American diver who competed at the 1928 and 1932 Summer Olympics.

In 1928, he finished fourth in the 3m springboard. Four years later in the 1932 Summer Olympics, he won the gold medal in the 10m platform and a silver in the 3m springboard. Domestically, he won the AAU springboard titles in the 1m in 1928 and 1930; and in the 3m in 1930 and 1931. After the 1932 Olympics, he became a professional show diver, and a diving coach at New York Athletic Club and Yale University. He also prepared the German diving team for the 1936 Summer Olympics. During World War II, he served as a captain in the United States Marine Corps. After the war, he worked as a pool manager at luxury hotels in Palm Springs and Santa Barbara. He died at age 49 of cancer.

== Honors ==
In 1979, Smith was inducted into the International Swimming Hall of Fame.

== On film ==
Dutch Smith and Egyptian champion Farid Sumaika appear in a Pete Smith short, Double Diving (1939), in which they give a 10-minute exhibition of synchronized diving, as pioneered by themselves.

== See also ==
- List of members of the International Swimming Hall of Fame
