= Elizabeth Becker-Pinkston =

American diver (1903–1989)

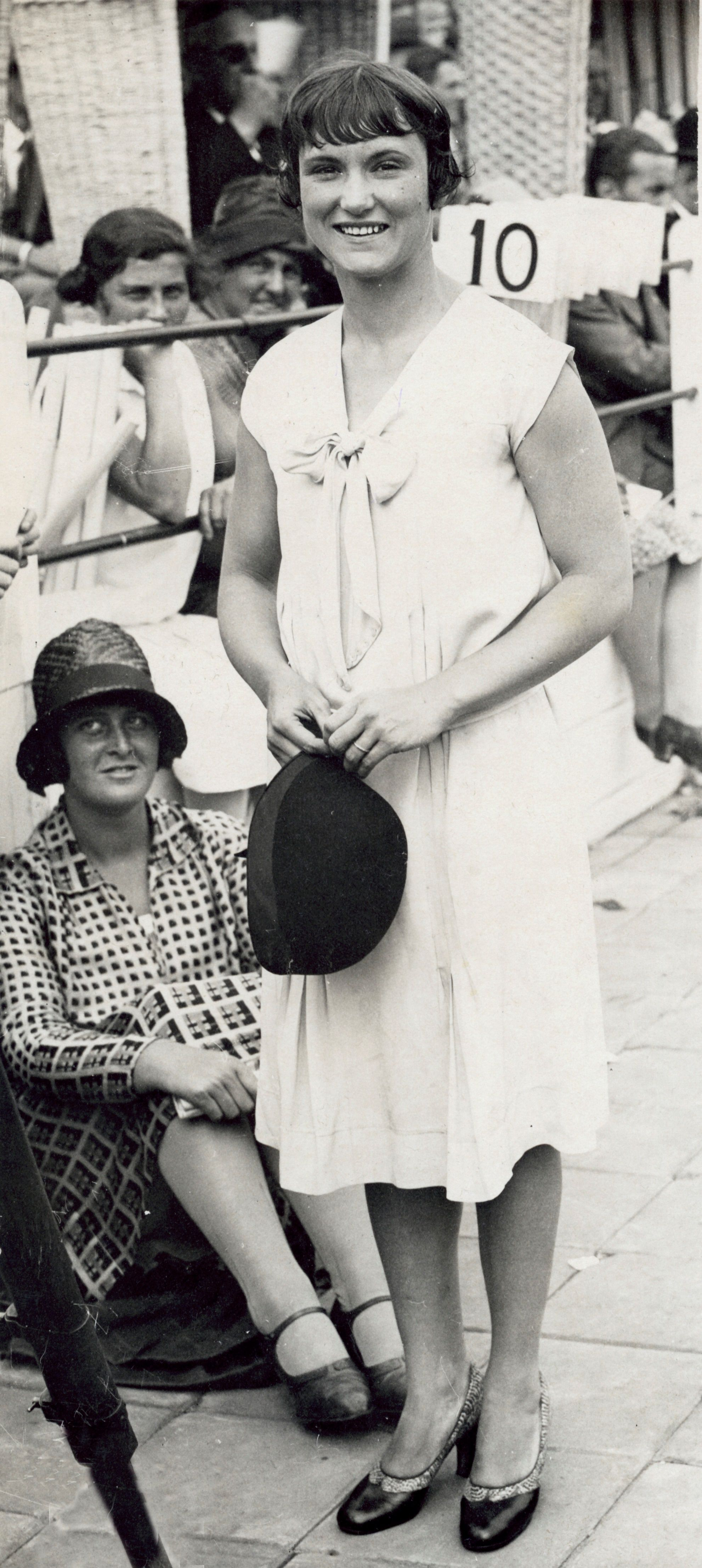
- Becker-Pinkston in 1928

Personal information
- Born: March 6, 1903 Philadelphia, Pennsylvania, United States
- Died: April 6, 1989 (aged 86) Detroit, Michigan, United States

Sport
- Sport: Diving
Medal record
Representing the United States
Olympic Games
Gold medal – first place	1924 Paris	3 m springboard
Gold medal – first place	1928 Amsterdam	10 m platform
Silver medal – second place	1924 Paris	10 m platform

Elizabeth Anna Becker-Pinkston (née Becker, later Campbell; March 6, 1903 – April 6, 1989) was an American diver who competed in the 1924 Summer Olympics and in the 1928 Summer Olympics.

In 1916, when she was 13 years old, she was recognized as a promising future swimming champion.

In 1924 she won the gold medal in the 3 metre springboard event as well as the silver medal in the 10 metre platform competition. Four years later she won the gold medal in the 10 metre platform event.

== See also ==
- List of members of the International Swimming Hall of Fame
