= Helen Meany =

American diver

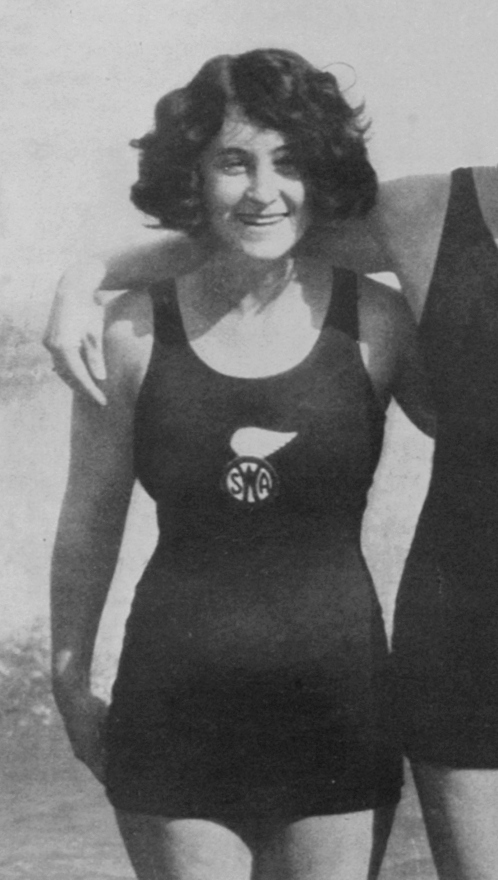
- Janicke

Personal information
- Born: December 15, 1904 New York City, U.S.
- Died: July 21, 1991 (aged 86) Greenwich, Connecticut, U.S.
- Height: 152 cm (5 ft 0 in)

Sport
- Sport: Diving
- Club: Women's Swimming Association
Medal record
Representing the United States
Olympic Games
Gold medal – first place	1928 Amsterdam	3 m springboard

Helen Meany (later Gravis, December 15, 1904 – July 21, 1991) was an American diver who competed at the 1920, 1924 and 1928 Summer Olympics. In 1920 she was eliminated in the first round of the 10 m platform competition. Four years later, she finished fifth in the 10 m platform. In 1928, she won the gold medal in the 3 m springboard.

Meany was the first American female diver to compete at three Olympics. Domestically, she won 17 AAU titles in 1920–1928 before appearing in paid exhibitions that disqualified her as an amateur. In September 1930 she married Harry Balfe. In 1971 she was inducted into the International Swimming Hall of Fame.
