= Henk Lotgering =

Dutch diver

Personal information
- Nationality: Dutch
- Born: 11 February 1903 Amsterdam, Netherlands
- Died: 13 September 1984 (aged 81) Amsterdam, Netherlands

Sport
- Sport: Diving

Hendrik "Henk" Lotgering (11 February 1903 – 13 September 1984) was a Dutch diver. He competed at the 1924 Summer Olympics and the 1928 Summer Olympics.
