= Italian record progression 800 metres freestyle =

== Long course (50 m) ==
=== Men ===
#	Time		Name	Club	Date	Meet	Location	Ref
1	11:44.80		Giuseppe Perentin	Pullino	1927	-	Bologna, Italy	
2	11:17.00		Giuseppe Perentin	Edera Trieste	1928	-	Amsterdam, Netherlands	
3	10:41.00		Paolo Costoli	Florentia	1930	-	Milan, Italy	
4	10:37.00		Giovanni Paliaga	R.N. Napoli	1950	-	Naples, Italy	
5	10:34.20		Giovanni Paliaga	R.N. Napoli	1950	-	Naples, Italy	
6	10:25.80		Angelo Romani	Vis Sauro	1952	-	Pesaro, Italy	
7	10:14.00		Giovanni Paliaga	Fiat Ricambi	1953	-	Sanremo, Italy	
8	10:11.90		Angelo Romani	Vis Sauro	1953	-	Pesaro, Italy	
9	10:09.50		Angelo Romani	Vis Sauro	1955	-	Terni, Italy	
10	09:56.80		Angelo Romani	Vis Sauro	1957	-	Pesaro, Italy	
11	09:52.30		Paolo Galletti	Florentia	1958	-	Rome, Italy	
12	09:47.50		Paolo Galletti	Florentia	1958	-	Budapest, Hungary	
13	09:39.60		Antonello Rastrelli	R.N. Napoli	1962	-	Naples, Italy	
14	09:38.50		Giovanni Orlando	Canottieri Napoli	1963	-	Milan, Italy	
15	09:36.60		Giorgio Quadri	Picanello	1976	-	Rome, Italy	
16	09:27.00		Sergio De Gregorio	Picanello	1965	-	Sanremo, Italy	
17	09:24.50		Sergio De Gregorio	Picanello	1965	-	Milan, Italy	
18	09:17.40		Sergio Alibertini	Picanello	1969	-	Syracuse, Sicily, Italy	
19	09:15.70		Sergio Alibertini	Picanello	1970	-	Rome, Italy	
20	09:14.10		Sandro Grassi	Florentia	1971	-	Rome, Italy	
21	09:10.10		Sandro Grassi	Florentia	1971	-	Syracuse, Sicily, Italy	
22	09:07.50		Sandro Grassi	Florentia	1971	-	Bolzano, Italy	
23	08:51.60		Arnaldo Cinquetti	Florentia	1972	-	Turin, Italy	
24	08:44.20		Sergio Affronte	Florentia	1975	-	Las Palmas, Spain	
25	08:43.61		Sergio Affronte	Florentia	1975	-	Algiers, Algeria	
26	08:36.60		Giorgio Quadri	Na	1976	-	Rome, Italy	
27	08:32.87		Fabio Bracaglia	Na	1976	-	Oslo, Norway	
28	08:32.64		Giorgio Quadri	Na	1977	-	Turin, Italy	
29	08:29.31		Giorgio Quadri	Na	1977	-	Rome, Italy	
30	08:28.99		Giorgio Quadri	Na	1978	-	Chiavari, Italy	
31	08:28.65		Giovanni Nagni	Na	1978	-	Rome, Italy	
32	08:24.40		Giorgio Quadri	Gymdomar	1979	-	Rome, Italy	
33	08:23.41		Giovanni Nagni	Gymdomar	1979	-	Florence, Italy	
34	08:20.77		Renato Paparella	Gymdomar	1981	-	Como, Italy	
35	08:18.27		Renato Paparella	Gymdomar	1982	-	Verona, Italy	
36	08:14.68		Mauro Rodella	Gymdomar	1982	-	Milan, Italy	
37	08:13.45		Stefano Grandi	Gymdomar	1984	-	Los Angeles, United States	
38	08:11.05		Stefano Battistelli	Gymdomar	1986	-	Berlin, Germany	
39	08:06.12		Stefano Battistelli	Gymdomar	1986	-	Madrid, Spain	
40	08:03.85		Giorgio Lamberti	Leonessa Brescia	1989	-	Genoa, Italy	
41	08:03.21		Emiliano Brembilla	Bergamo Nuoto	1996	-	Rome, Italy	
42	07:59.83		Emiliano Brembilla	Carabinieri	1997	-	Rome, Italy	
43	07:57.02		Andrea Righi	Futura Prato	2001	-	Livorno, Italy	
44	07:51.82		Massimiliano Rosolino	Larus Nuoto	2005	-	Rome, Italy	
45	07:50.40		Massimiliano Rosolino	Larus Nuoto	2005	-	Riccione, Italy	
46	07:49.98		Federico Colbertaldo	Nazionale	2007	-	Melbourne, Australia	
47	07:48.13		Samuel Pizzetti	-	26 May 2009	Italian Championships	Pescara, Italy	
48	07:43.84		Federico Colbertaldo	National Team	29 July 2009	World Championships	Rome, Italy	
49	07:42.74		Gabriele Detti	Centro Sportivo Esercito	8 April 2014	Italian Championships	Riccione, Italy	
50	07:40.81		Gregorio Paltrinieri	National Team	5 August 2015	World Championships	Kazan, Russia	
51	07:40.77		Gabriele Detti	National Team	26 July 2017	World Championships	Budapest, Hungary	
52	07:39.27	ER	Gregorio Paltrinieri	National Team	24 July 2019	World Championships	Gwangju, South Korea	

Legend: # – Record awaiting ratification by Italian Swimming Federation; WR – World record; ER – European record;
Records not set in finals: h – heat; sf – semifinal; r – relay 1st leg; rh – relay heat 1st leg; b – B final; † – en route to final mark; tt – time trial

=== Women ===
#	Time		Name	Club	Date	Meet	Location	Ref
1	15:51.50		N. Gamenara	Sanremese	1932	-	Bologna, Italy	
2	15:33.50		Grazia Scalia	Roma nuoto	1932	-	Rome, Italy	
3	15:12.80		Grazia Scalia	Torino Nuoto	1933	-	Rome, Italy	
4	13:15.50		Narcisa Foscati	Torino Nuoto	1935	-	Sanremo, Italy	
5	13:13.30		S. Samuel	Torino n.	1938	-	Sanremo, Italy	
6	12:55.20		M. Kratochwila	Giordana Genova	1938	-	Sanremo, Italy	
7	12:28.20		Romana Calligaris	R.N. Napoli	1949	-	Trieste, Italy	
8	12:08.00		Sandra Valle	R.N. Napoli	1957	-	Rome, Italy	
9	11:41.30		Sandra Valle	R.N. Napoli	1957	-	Rome, Italy	
10	11:39.90		Sandra Valle	R.n. napoli	1958	-	Rome, Italy	
11	11:32.70		Velleda Veschi	Doria	1959	-	Rome, Italy	
12	11:24.20		Sandra Valle	Doria	1959	-	Rome, Italy	
13	11:23.00		Velleda Veschi	Doria	1960	-	Rome, Italy	
14	11:17.80		Gisella Costoli	Doria	1961	-	Rome, Italy	
15	10:52.70		Velleda Veschi	Doria	1961	-	Rome, Italy	
16	10:44.60		Valentina Martinoli	Doria	1963	-	Genoa, Italy	
17	10:19.30		Novella Calligaris	Nazionale	1968	-	Minsk, Belarus	
18	09:57.70		Novella Calligaris	Nazionale	1968	-	Málaga, Spain	
19	09:56.70		Novella Calligaris	Nazionale	1968	-	Milan, Italy	
20	09:46.60		Novella Calligaris	Nazionale	1969	-	Prague, Czech Republic	
21	09:38.00		Novella Calligaris	Nazionale	1969	-	Naples, Italy	
22	09:36.90		Novella Calligaris	Nazionale	1969	-	Vienna, Austria	
23	09:36.70		Novella Calligaris	Nazionale	1970	-	Barcelona, Spain	
24	09:30.80		Novella Calligaris	Nazionale	1971	-	Milan, Italy	
25	09:23.80		Novella Calligaris	Nazionale	1971	-	Rome, Italy	
26	09:20.90		Novella Calligaris	Nazionale	1971	-	Bolzano, Italy	
27	09:20.80		Novella Calligaris	Nazionale	1971	-	Udine, Italy	
28	09:20.40		Novella Calligaris	Na	1972	-	[[Hamilton]], Italy	
29	09:19.90		Novella Calligaris	Na	1972	-	Bolzano, Italy	
30	09:13.40		Novella Calligaris	Na	1972	-	Rome, Italy	
31	09:06.00		Novella Calligaris	Gre	1972	-	Turin, Italy	
32	09:02.96		Novella Calligaris	Snam	1972	-	Munich, Germany	
33	08:57.46		Novella Calligaris	Snam	1972	-	Munich, Germany	
34	08:52.97		Novella Calligaris	Snam	1973	-	Belgrade, Serbia	
35	08:52.02		Roberta Felotti	Snam	1978	-	Florence, Italy	
36	08:51.58		Roberta Felotti	Snam	1979	-	Milan, Italy	
37	08:49.55		Roberta Felotti	Snam	1979	-	Palma de Mallorca, Spain	
38	08:47.60		Roberta Felotti	Snam	1979	-	Tokyo, Japan	
39	08:45.34		Roberta Felotti	Snam	1980	-	Piacenza, Italy	
40	08:43.40		Carla Lasi	SNAM	1983	-	Rome, Italy	
41	08:41.84		Carla Lasi	SNAM	1984	-	Los Angeles, United States	
42	08:39.70		Manuela Melchiorri	Mantova	1988	-	Rome, Italy	
43	08:39.58		Manuela Melchiorri	Mantova	1989	-	Ravenna, Italy	
44	08:35.84		Manuela Melchiorri	Mantova	1989	-	Rome, Italy	
45	08:28.92		Cristina Sossi	Mantova	1989	-	Bonn, Germany	
46	08:20.23		Alessia Filippi	-	16 August 2008	Olympic Games	Beijing, China	
47	08:17.21		Alessia Filippi	National Team	1 August 2009	World Championships	Rome, Italy	
48	08:16.45		Simona Quadarella	National Team	4 August 2018	European Championships	Glasgow, United Kingdom	
49	8:14.99		Simona Quadarella	National Team	27 July 2019	World Championships	Gwangju, South Korea	
50	8:14.55		Simona Quadarella	Italy	3 August 2024	Olympic Games	Paris, France	
51	8:12.81	ER	Simona Quadarella	Italy	2 August 2025	World Championships	Singapore, Singapore	

Legend: # – Record awaiting ratification by Italian Swimming Federation; WR – World record; ER – European record;
Records not set in finals: h – heat; sf – semifinal; r – relay 1st leg; rh – relay heat 1st leg; b – B final; † – en route to final mark; tt – time trial

== Short course (25 m) ==
=== Men ===
#	Time		Name	Club	Date	Meet	Location	Ref
1	08:15.10		Paolo Revelli	San Donato	1981	-	Gainesville, United States	
2	08:08.41		Renato Paparella	San Donato	1983	-	Paris, France	
3	08:01.97		Stefano Grandi	Gymdomar	1984	-	Ravenna, Italy	
4	08:01.11		Stefano Battistelli	Gymdomar	1987	-	Turin, Italy	
5	08:00.87		Massimo Trevisan	Garbagnate	1987	-	Turin, Italy	
6	07:55.60		Giorgio Lamberti	Garbagnate	1987	-	Verona, Italy	
7	07:53.60		Massimo Trevisan	Garbagnate	1989	-	Bonn, Germany	
8	07:52.70		Massimo Trevisan	Carabinieri	1992	-	Milan, Italy	
9	07:51.84		Piermaria Siciliano	Fiamme Gialle	1995	-	Paris, France	
10	07:47.64		Emiliano Brembilla	Bergamo Nuoto	1997	-	Imperia, Italy	
11	07:39.30		Emiliano Brembilla	Carabinieri	1998	-	Sydney, Australia	
12	07:31.18		Federico Colbertaldo	National Team	19 December 2009	Duel in the Pool	Manchester, United Kingdom	
13	07:30.31	†	Gregorio Paltrinieri	National Team	16 December 2018	World Championships	Hangzhou, China	
14	07:27.94		Gregorio Paltrinieri	National Team	7 November 2021	European Championships	Kazan, Russia	

Legend: # – Record awaiting ratification by Italian Swimming Federation; WR – World record; ER – European record;
Records not set in finals: h – heat; sf – semifinal; r – relay 1st leg; rh – relay heat 1st leg; b – B final; † – en route to final mark; tt – time trial

=== Women ===
#	Time	Name	Club	Date	Meet	Location	Ref
1	8:42.10	Roberta Felotti	N.C. Verona	1981	-	Verona, Italy	
2	8:42.10	Carla Lasi	San Donato	1982	-	Crema, Italy	
3	8:38.70	Carla Lasi	San Donato	1983	-	Asti, Italy	
4	8:35.82	Carla Lasi	SNAM	1985	-	Loano, Italy	
5	8:35.11	Tanya Vannini	Fiorentina Nuoto	1987	-	Loano, Italy	
6	8:33.00	Manuela Melchiorri	Fiamme Gialle	1988	-	Rome, Italy	
7	8:26.91	Manuela Melchiorri	Fiamme Gialle	1989	-	Lavagna, Italy	
8	8:26.09	Cristina Sossi	Leonessa Brescia	1991	-	Milan, Italy	
9	8:25.32	Simona Ricciardi	Fiamme Gialle	2005	-	Trieste, Italy	
10	8:21.40	Simona Ricciardi	Esp	2005	-	Trieste, Italy	
11	8:16.35	Alessia Filippi	Aurelia Nuoto	2007	-	Berlin, Germany	
12	8:12.84	Alessia Filippi	Aurelia Nuoto	14 December 2007	-	Debrecen, Hungary	
13	8:04.53	Alessia Filippi	Aurelia Nuoto	12 December 2008	European Championships	Rijeka, Croatia	
14	8:03.00	Simona Quadarella	Italy	5 December 2025	European Championships	Lublin, Poland	

Legend: # – Record awaiting ratification by Italian Swimming Federation; WR – World record; ER – European record;
Records not set in finals: h – heat; sf – semifinal; r – relay 1st leg; rh – relay heat 1st leg; b – B final; † – en route to final mark; tt – time trial
