= Italian record progression 400 metres freestyle =

== Long course (50 m) ==
=== Men ===
#	Time	Name	Club	Date	Meet	Location	Ref
1	5:34.00	Mario Massa	Juv. Nervi	1923	-	Rijeka, Croatia	
2	5:32.20	Giuseppe Perentin	Pullino	1927	-	Bologna, Italy	
3	5:27.20	R. Baciagalupo	Nafta Ge.	1928	-	Rome, Italy	
4	5:25.00	Giuseppe Perentin	Edera Trieste	1929	-	Bologna, Italy	
5	5:24.00	Paolo Costoli	Libero	1929	-	Rome, Italy	
6	5:19.00	Paolo Costoli	Libero	1929	-	Rome, Italy	
7	4:54.60	Giovanni Paliaga	R.n. Napoli	1950	-	Turin, Italy	
8	4:40.40	Angelo Romani	Vis Sauro	1954	-	Turin, Italy	
9	4:37.60	Angelo Romani	Italy	1 Dec 1956	Olympic Games	Melbourne, Australia	
10	4:37.50	Fritz Dennerlein	Can. Napoli	1960	-	Rome, Italy	
11	4:35.60	Paolo Galletti	Florentia	1960	-	Rome, Italy	
12	4:31.10	Giovanni Orlando	Can. Napoli	1961	-	Turin, Italy	
13	4:29.90	Giovanni Orlando	Can. Napoli	1962	-	Leipzig, Germany	
14	4:29.80	Sergio De Gregorio	Roma Nuoto	1963	-	Sanremo, Italy	
15	4:25.80	Pierpaolo Spangaro	Edera Trieste	1964	-	Sanremo, Italy	
16	4:21.40	Sandro Grassi	Florentia	1971	-	Syracuse, Italy	
17	4:19.60	Sandro Grassi	Florentia	1971	-	Milan, Italy	
18	4:19.60	Arnaldo Cinquetti	Fiamme Oro Roma	1972	-	Rome, Italy	
19	4:19.00	Arnaldo Cinquetti	Fiamme Oro Roma	1972	-	Groningen, Netherlands	
20	4:16.30	Arnaldo Cinquetti	Fiamme Oro Roma	1972	-	Rome, Italy	
21	4:13.60	Arnaldo Cinquetti	Fiamme Oro Roma	1972	-	Turin, Italy	
22	4:11.50	Arnaldo Cinquetti	Fiamme Oro Roma	1973	-	Bratislava, Slovakia	
23	4:09.37	Arnaldo Cinquetti	Fiamme Oro Roma	1973	-	Belgrade, Serbia	
24	4:06.70	Marcello Guarducci	Carabinieri	1976	-	Acapulco, Mexico	
25	4:03.95	Fabio Bracaglia	Lazio Nuoto	1976	-	Oslo, Norway	
26	4:02.01	Giorgio Quadri	Lazio Nuoto	1977	-	Chiavari, Italy	
27	3:59.71	Paolo Revelli	De Gregorio-NC Verona	1978	-	Rome, Italy	
28	3:58.90	Paolo Revelli	De Gregorio-NC Verona	1978	-	Berlin, Germany	
29	3:58.17	Giorgio Quadri	Fiamme Oro Roma	1980	-	Piacenza, Italy	
30	3:56.73	M. Rodella	Fiat Ricambi	1982	-	Chiavari, Italy	
31	3:56.03	Marco Dell'Uomo	De Gregorio-NC Verona	1984	-	Amersfoort, Netherlands	
32	3:55.73	Marco Dell'Uomo	De Gregorio-NC Verona	1984	-	Rome, Italy	
33	3:55.00	Marco Dell'Uomo	De Gregorio-NC Verona	1984	-	Los Angeles, United States	
34	3:52.73	Giorgio Lamberti	Leonessa Brescia	1987	-	Strasbourg, France	
35	3:50.58	Giorgio Lamberti	Leonessa Brescia	1988	-	San Donato Milanese, Italy	
36	3:50.46	Giorgio Lamberti	Leonessa Brescia	1991	-	Athens, Greece	
37	3:49.35	Emiliano Brembilla	Bergamo Nuoto	1996	-	Atlanta, United States	
38	3:49.32	Emiliano Brembilla	Carabinieri	1997	-	Bari, Italy	
39	3:48.94	Emiliano Brembilla	Carabinieri	1997	-	San Donato Milanese, Italy	
40	3:45.96	Emiliano Brembilla	Carabinieri	1997	-	Seville, Spain	
41	3:45.65	Massimiliano Rosolino	Canottieri	2000	-	Sydney, Australia	
42	3:43.40	Massimiliano Rosolino	Italy	16 Sep 2000	Olympic Games	Sydney, Australia	

Legend: # – Record awaiting ratification by Italian Swimming Federation; WR – World record; ER – European record;
Records not set in finals: h – heat; sf – semifinal; r – relay 1st leg; rh – relay heat 1st leg; b – B final; † – en route to final mark; tt – time trial

=== Women ===
#	Time	Name	Club	Date	Meet	Location	Ref
1	06:51.80	Nerina Bravin	Sturla	1929	-	Rome, Italy	
2	06:45.20	Ines Sulligi	Sturla	1931	-	Rome, Italy	
3	06:39.20	Emanuela Toso	Sturla	1933	-	Bologna, Italy	
4	06:27.80	Narcisa Foscati	Sturla	1936	-	Trieste, Italy	
5	06:21.40	Liliana Riva	Sturla	1937	-	Sanremo, Italy	
6	06:18.20	S. Samuel	Torino N.	1935	-	Sanremo, Italy	
7	06:11.80	Etta Radivo	Giordana Genova	1938	-	Trieste, Italy	
8	06:02.90	M. Kratochwila	Giordana Genova	1938	-	Sanremo, Italy	
9	05:55.50	Etta Radivo	N/a	1941	-	Sanremo, Italy	
10	05:42.20	Romana Calligaris	R.n. napoli	1949	-	Venice, Italy	
11	05:36.40	Romana Calligaris	R.N. Napoli	1950	-	Levanto, Italy	
12	05:35.40	Romana Calligaris	R.N. Napoli	1951	-	Trieste, Italy	
13	05:35.40	Romana Calligaris	R.N. Napoli	1951	-	Trieste, Italy	
14	05:34.90	Sandra Valle	R.N. Napoli	1957	-	Rome, Italy	
15	05:31.00	Sandra Valle	R.N. Napoli	1957	-	Paris, France	
16	05:30.10	Sandra Valle	R.N. Napoli	1957	-	Genoa, Italy	
17	05:28.80	Romana Calligaris	Na	1951	-	Marseille, France	
18	05:22.60	Velleda Veschi	-	1957	-	Genoa, Italy	
19	05:19.30	Velleda Veschi	-	1958	-	Budapest, Hungary	
20	05:15.50	Paola Saini	-	1960	-	Rome, Italy	
21	05:13.10	Paola Saini	-	1960	-	Rome, Italy	
22	05:12.80	Paola Saini	-	1961	-	Turin, Italy	
23	05:09.00	Daniela Beneck	-	1962	-	Rome, Italy	
24	05:08.00	Paola Saini	-	1962	-	Moscow, Russia	
25	05:06.10	Daniela Beneck	-	1962	-	Sanremo, Italy	
26	05:05.30	Daniela Beneck	-	1962	-	Genoa, Italy	
27	05:04.80	Daniela Beneck	-	1962	-	Rome, Italy	
28	04:56.90	Daniela Beneck	Nazionale	1964	-	Paris, France	
29	04:56.10	Daniela Beneck	Nazionale	1964	-	Dieren, Netherlands	
30	04:52.20	Daniela Beneck	Nazionale	1965	-	Sanremo, Italy	
31	04:51.50	Nives Cassera	Nazionale	1968	-	Málaga, Spain	
32	04:46.20	Novella Calligaris	Nazionale	1969	-	Milan, Italy	
33	04:45.70	Novella Calligaris	Nazionale	1969	-	Belgrade, Serbia	
34	04:42.70	Novella Calligaris	Nazionale	1969	-	Naples, Italy	
35	04:42.20	Novella Calligaris	Nazionale	1969	-	Vienna, Italy	
36	04:39.10	Novella Calligaris	Nazionale	1969	-	Dubrovnik, Italy	
37	04:38.30	Novella Calligaris	Nazionale	1971	-	Düsseldorf, Germany	
38	04:36.80	Novella Calligaris	Nazionale	1971	-	Rome, Italy	
39	04:33.60	Novella Calligaris	Nazionale	1971	-	Berlin, Germany	
40	04:31.90	Novella Calligaris	Nazionale	1971	-	Bolzano, Italy	
41	04:31.90	Novella Calligaris	Nazionale	1971	-	Bolzano, Italy	
42	04:31.80	Novella Calligaris	Nazionale	1972	-	Rome, Italy	
43	04:29.10	Novella Calligaris	Nazionale	1972	-	Syracuse, Italy	
44	04:29.10	Novella Calligaris	Nazionale	1972	-	Syracuse, Italy	
45	04:26.70	Novella Calligaris	Nazionale	1972	-	Turin, Italy	
46	04:24.14	Novella Calligaris	Gre	1978	-	Munich, Germany	
47	04:22.44	Novella Calligaris	Snam	1972	-	Munich, Germany	
48	04:22.44	Novella Calligaris	Gre	1972	-	Munich, Germany	
49	04:21.79	Novella Calligaris	SNAM	1973	-	Belgrade, Serbia	
50	04:21.79	Novella Calligaris	Gre	1973	-	Belgrade, Serbia	
51	04:19.90	Roberta Felotti	SNAM	1979	-	Rome, Italy	
52	04:18.94	Roberta Felotti	SNAM	1979	-	Split, Croatia	
53	04:18.29	Roberta Felotti	SNAM	1980	-	Piacenza, Italy	
54	04:18.14	Carla Lasi	SNAM	1983	-	Rome, Italy	
55	04:15.51	Carla Lasi	SNAM	1984	-	Rome, Italy	
56	04:15.37	Orietta Patron	Gabbiano	1987	-	Rome, Italy	
57	04:13.31	Tanya Vannini	Fiorentina N.	1987	-	Strasbourg, France	
58	04:10.71	Tanya Vannini	Fiorentina N.	1987	-	Strasbourg, France	
59	04:10.38	Federica Pellegrini	Dds	2005	-	Riccione, Italy	
60	04:08.56	Alessia Filippi	Fiamme Gialle	2006	-	Riccione, Italy	
61	04:06.51	Federica Pellegrini	Aniene	2007	-	Melbourne, Australia	
62	04:05.79	Federica Pellegrini	Nazionale	2007	-	Melbourne, Australia	
63	04:01.53	Federica Pellegrini	Nazionale	24 Mar 2008	-	Eindhoven, Netherlands	

Legend: # – Record awaiting ratification by Italian Swimming Federation; WR – World record; ER – European record;
Records not set in finals: h – heat; sf – semifinal; r – relay 1st leg; rh – relay heat 1st leg; b – B final; † – en route to final mark; tt – time trial

== Short course (25 m) ==
=== Men ===
#	Time		Name	Club	Date	Meet	Location	Ref
1	5:05.40		Paolo Costoli	Florentia	1929	-	Nice, France	
2	4:54.80		Paolo Costoli	Florentia	1953	-	Marseille, France	
3	4:47.80		Giovanni Paliaga	Fiat Ricambi	1953	-	Turin, Italy	
4	4:30.00	ER	Angelo Romani	Dom	1956	-	New Haven, United States	
5	3:52.21		Paolo Revelli	Carabinieri	1981	-	Gainesville, United States	
6	3:49.72		Marco Dell'Uomo	Carabinieri	1984	-	Ravenna, Italy	
7	3:46.70		Giorgio Lamberti	Carabinieri	1987	-	Loano, Italy	
8	3:46.13		Giorgio Lamberti	Carabinieri	1988	-	Bonn, Germany	
9	3:41.74		Giorgio Lamberti	Carabinieri	1988	-	Bonn, Germany	
10	3:41.74		Giorgio Lamberti	Dom	1988	-	Bonn, Germany	
11	3:41.15		Giorgio Lamberti	Carabinieri	1990	-	Desenzano, Italy	
12	3:40.89		Giorgio Lamberti	Carabinieri	1990	-	Viareggio, Italy	
13	3:40.83		Federico Colbertaldo	Dom	2007	-	Debrecen, Hungary	
14	3:40.45		Emiliano Brembilla	Canottieri	1998	-	Sheffield, United Kingdom	
15	3:39.59		Massimiliano Rosolino	Larus Nuoto	2000	-	Valencia, Spain	
16	3:39.55		Massimiliano Rosolino	Larus Nuoto	4 February 2006	-	East Meadow, United States	
17	3:38.49	h	Federico Colbertaldo	Italy	11 December 2008	European Championships	Rijeka, Croatia	
18	3:37.22		Gabriele Detti	Italy	2 December 2015	European Championships	Netanya, Israel	
19	3:36.63		Gabriele Detti	In Sport Rane Rosse	7 April 2019	Coppa Caduti di Brema	Riccione, Italy	

Legend: # – Record awaiting ratification by Italian Swimming Federation; WR – World record; ER – European record;
Records not set in finals: h – heat; sf – semifinal; r – relay 1st leg; rh – relay heat 1st leg; b – B final; † – en route to final mark; tt – time trial

=== Women ===
#	Time	Name	Club	Date	Meet	Location	Ref
1	4:14.40	Carla Lasi	San Donato	1982	-	Asti, Italy	
2	4:14.20	Carla Lasi	SNAM	1984	-	Verolanuova, Italy	
3	4:13.68	Carla Lasi	SNAM	1984	-	Ravenna, Italy	
4	4:12.44	Tanya Vannini	Amici N. Firenze	1985	-	Loano, Italy	
5	4:10.83	Tanya Vannini	Fiorentina N.	1986	-	Bonn, Germany	
6	4:09.90	Manuela Melchiorri	Fiorentina N.	1989	-	Lavagna, Italy	
7	4:09.48	Manuela Melchiorri	Dds	1990	-	Desenzano, Italy	
8	4:09.48	Tanya Vannini	Fiorentina N.	1990	-	Desenzano, Italy	
9	4:09.38	Simona Ricciardi	Dds	2002	-	Verona, Italy	
10	4:08.48	Simona Ricciardi	Fiamme Gialle	2002	-	Camogli, Italy	
11	4:08.48	Simona Ricciardi	Fiamme Gialle	2003	-	Camogli, Italy	
12	4:04.42	Simona Ricciardi	Fiamme Gialle	2005	-	Viareggio, Italy	
13	4:02.81	Federica Pellegrini	Nazionale	2005	-	Trieste, Italy	
14	3:59.96	Federica Pellegrini	Nazionale	9 December 2006	-	Helsinki, Finland	
15	3:59.35	Alessia Filippi	Aurelia Nuoto	13 December 2008	European Championships	Rijeka, Croatia	
16	3:57.59	Federica Pellegrini	Circolo Canottieri Aniene	6 March 2011	Italian Team Championships	Ostia (Rome), Italy	
17	3:56.70	Simona Quadarella	Italy	2 December 2025	European Championships	Lublin, Poland	

Legend: # – Record awaiting ratification by Italian Swimming Federation; WR – World record; ER – European record;
Records not set in finals: h – heat; sf – semifinal; r – relay 1st leg; rh – relay heat 1st leg; b – B final; † – en route to final mark; tt – time trial
