= Italian record progression 200 metres freestyle =

The Italian record progression in the 200 metres freestyle documents the improvement of Italy’s national best times in the 200 m freestyle event for both men and women, in long course (50 m) and short course (25 m) pools.

== Long course (50 m) ==
=== Men ===
#	Time		Name	Club	Date	Meet	Location	Ref
1	2:24.40		Paolo Costoli	Florentia	1929	-	Nice, France	
2	2:16.40		Alfonso Buonocore	Canottieri Napoli	1950	-	Naples, Italy	
3	2:14.20		Angelo Romani	Vis Sauro	1952	-	Pesaro, Italy	
4	2:13.20		Angelo Romani	Vis Sauro	1953	-	Pesaro, Italy	
5	2:09.60		Angelo Romani	Vis Sauro	1954	-	Turin, Italy	
6	2:09.00		Angelo Romani	Vis Sauro	1956	-	Rome, Italy	
7	2:08.30		Paolo Pucci	Lazio Nuoto	1958	-	Turin, Italy	
8	2:07.30		Fritz Dennerlein	Canottieri Napoli	1960	-	Hamburg, Germany	
9	2:06.10		Fritz Dennerlein	Canottieri Napoli	1961	-	Turin, Italy	
10	2:05.40		Giovanni Orlando	Canottieri Napoli	1962	-	Rome, Italy	
11	2:04.00		Bruno Bianchi	Fiat Ricambi	1964	-	Sanremo, Italy	
12	2:03.40		Sergio De Gregorio	Roma Nuoto	1964	-	Tokyo, Japan	
13	2:01.10		Sergio De Gregorio	Roma Nuoto	1965	-	Milan, Italy	
14	2:01.10		Fabrizio Nardini	Fiamme Oro Roma	1970	-	Barcelona, Spain	
15	2:01.00		Lorenzo Marugo	Genova N.	1972	-	Turin, Italy	
16	1:59.40		Arnaldo Cinquetti	Fiamme Oro Roma	1973	-	Bratislava, Slovakia	
17	1:59.00		Arnaldo Cinquetti	Fiamme Oro Roma	1972	-	Turin, Italy	
18	1:58.40		Arnaldo Cinquetti	Fiamme Oro Roma	1973	-	Belgrade, Serbia	
19	1:55.80		Marcello Guarducci	R.N. Trento	1975	-	Las Palmas, Spain	
20	1:54.70		Marcello Guarducci	Carabinieri	1976	-	Acapulco, Mexico	
21	1:53.72		Marcello Guarducci	Carabinieri	1976	-	Montreal, Canada	
22	1:53.72		Marcello Guarducci	Carabinieri	1976	-	Montreal, Canada	
23	1:52.35		Marcello Guarducci	Carabinieri	1977	-	Jönköping, Sweden	
24	1:52.23		Marcello Guarducci	Carabinieri	1978	-	West Berlin, Germany	
25	1:51.85		Fabrizio Rampazzo	Nuoto 2000	1981	-	Turin, Italy	
26	1:51.47		Paolo Revelli	De Gregorio-NC Verona	1983	-	Rome, Italy	
27	1:51.25		Paolo Revelli	De Gregorio-NC Verona	1983	-	Rome, Italy	
28	1:50.31		Giorgio Lamberti	Leonessa Brescia	1987	-	Buenos Aires, Argentina	
29	1:50.01		Giorgio Lamberti	Leonessa Brescia	1987	-	Buenos Aires, Argentina	
30	1:49.08		Giorgio Lamberti	Leonessa Brescia	1987	-	Catania, Italy	
31	1:48.68		Giorgio Lamberti	Leonessa Brescia	1987	-	Strasbourg, France	
32	1:48.20		Giorgio Lamberti	Leonessa Brescia	1988	-	East Berlin, Germany	
33	1:47.90		Giorgio Lamberti	Leonessa Brescia	1988	-	Florence, Italy	
34	1:46.69	WR	Giorgio Lamberti	Italy	15 Aug 1989	European Championships	Bonn, Germany	
35	1:46.60		Massimiliano Rosolino	Italy	17 Sep 2000	Olympic Games	Sydney, Australia	
36	1:46.33		Marco Belotti	Canottieri Aniene	5 Mar 2009	Italian Championships	Pescara, Italy	
37	1:46.29	r	Emiliano Brembilla	Italy	31 Jul 2009	World Championships	Rome, Italy	
38	1:45.76	sf	Filippo Megli	Italy	22 Jul 2019	World Championships	Gwangju, South Korea	
39	1:45.67		Filippo Megli	Italy	23 Jul 2019	World Championships	Gwangju, South Korea	
40	1:45.23	sf	Carlos D'Ambrosio	Italy	28 July 2025	World Championships	Singapore, Singapore	
41	1:45.15		Carlos D'Ambrosio	Italy	20 August 2025	World Junior Championships	Otopeni, Romania	

Legend: # – Record awaiting ratification by Italian Swimming Federation; WR – World record; ER – European record;
Records not set in finals: h – heat; sf – semifinal; r – relay 1st leg; rh – relay heat 1st leg; b – B final; † – en route to final mark; tt – time trial

=== Women ===
#	Time		Name	Club	Date	Meet	Location	Ref
1	03:23.40		Nerina Bravin	Giordana Genova	1927	-	Bologna, Italy	
2	02:58.20		Ines Sulligi	Giordana Genova	1933	-	Bologna, Italy	
3	02:53.60		Narcisa Foscati	Giordana Genova	1935	-	Sanremo, Italy	
4	02:51.00		M. Kratochwila	Giordana Genova	1938	-	Merano, Italy	
5	02:50.70		M. Kratochwila	Giordana Genova	1938	-	Sanremo, Italy	
6	02:50.40		M. Kratochwila	Giordana Genova	1939	-	Genoa, Italy	
7	02:48.80		B. Lokar	R.N. Trento	1939	-	Trieste, Italy	
8	02:45.40		M. Santoro	R.N. Trento	1947	-	Turin, Italy	
9	02:42.30		Romena Calligaris	R.N. Napoli	1949	-	Split, Croatia, Croatia	
10	02:38.70		Romena Calligaris	R.N. Napoli	1950	-	Milan, Italy	
11	02:38.20		Romena Calligaris	R.N. Napoli	1950	-	Genoa, Italy	
12	02:36.50		Sandra Valle	R.N. Napoli	1956	-	Genoa, Italy	
13	02:36.30		Sandra Valle	R.N. Napoli	1957	-	Rome, Italy	
14	02:35.80		Velleda Veschi	N/a	1958	-	Milan, Italy	
15	02:30.90		Paola Saini	N.C. Milano	1959	-	Rome, Italy	
16	02:29.90		Paola Saini	N.C. Milano	1960	-	Rome, Italy	
17	02:29.40		Paola Saini	N.C. Milano	1960	-	Rome, Italy	
18	02:28.20		Paola Saini	N.C. Milano	1960	-	Split, Croatia, Croatia	
19	02:26.60		Paola Saini	N.C. Milano	1961	-	Rome, Italy	
20	02:26.50		Paola Saini	N.C. Milano	1961	-	Rome, Italy	
21	02:22.70		Paola Saini	N.C. Milano	1961	-	Rome, Italy	
22	02:18.80		Daniela Beneck	N.C. Milano	1964	-	Rome, Italy	
23	02:18.00		Daniela Beneck	N.C. Milano	1965	-	Rome, Italy	
24	02:18.00		Daniela Beneck	ISR	1965	-	Rome, Italy	
25	02:17.50		Mara Sacchi	N.C. Milano	1968	-	Málaga, Italy	
26	02:17.40		Novella Calligaris	R.N. Patavium	1969	-	Belgrade, Serbia	
27	02:16.30		Novella Calligaris	R.N. Patavium	1969	-	Rome, Italy	
28	02:13.00		Novella Calligaris	R.N. Patavium	1970	-	Paris, France	
29	02:12.60		Novella Calligaris	R.N. Patavium	1971	-	Berlin, Italy	
30	02:12.20		Novella Calligaris	R.N. Patavium	1971	-	Bolzano, Italy	
31	02:11.50		Novella Calligaris	R.N. Patavium	1971	-	Rome, Italy	
32	02:11.20		Novella Calligaris	N/a	1972	-	Milan, Italy	
33	02:07.49		Laura Bortolotti	Fiorentina N.	1975	-	Milan, Italy	
34	02:07.17		Cinzia Savi Scarponi	Fiorentina N.	1978	-	Chiavari, Italy	
35	02:06.10		Roberta Felotti	Fiorentina N.	1979	-	Rome, Italy	
36	02:06.02		Roberta Felotti	Fiorentina N.	1979	-	Rome, Italy	
37	02:04.96		Roberta Felotti	Fiorentina N.	1979	-	Split, Croatia, Croatia	
38	02:04.28		Carla Lasi	Fiorentina N.	1982	-	Verona, Italy	
39	02:03.41		Silvia Persi	Fiorentina N.	1984	-	Rome, Italy	
40	02:03.17		Silvia Persi	Fiorentina N.	1984	-	Los Angeles, United States	
41	02:02.36		Tanya Vannini	Fiorentina N.	1986	-	Città di Castello, Italy	
42	02:01.12		Orietta Patron	Gabbiano	1987	-	Rome, Italy	
43	02:00.91		Sara Parise	SSV Laives	2000	-	Monfalcone, Italy	
44	02:00.07		Sara Parise	SSV Laives	2000	-	Sydney, Australia	
45	01:59.23		Federica Pellegrini	DDS	2004	-	Livorno, Italy	
46	01:58.59		Federica Pellegrini	DDS	2004	-	Pesaro, Italy	
47	01:58.59		Federica Pellegrini	DDS	2004	-	Pesaro, Italy	
48	01:58.22		Federica Pellegrini	DDS	2004	-	Athens, Greece	
49	01:57.92		Federica Pellegrini	DDS	2005	-	Riccione, Italy	
50	01:56.47	WR	Federica Pellegrini	Nazionale	27 Mar 2007	2007 World Championships	Melbourne, Australia	
51	01:55.45	h, WR	Federica Pellegrini	Nazionale	11 Aug 2008	2008 Summer Olympics	Beijing, China	
52	01:54.82	WR	Federica Pellegrini	Nazionale	13 Aug 2008	2008 Summer Olympics	Beijing, China	
53	01:52.98	WR	Federica Pellegrini	Nazionale	29 Jul 2009	2009 World Championships	Rome, Italy	

Legend: # – Record awaiting ratification by Italian Swimming Federation; WR – World record; ER – European record;
Records not set in finals: h – heat; sf – semifinal; r – relay 1st leg; rh – relay heat 1st leg; b – B final; † – en route to final mark; tt – time trial

== Short course (25 m) ==
=== Men ===
#	Time	Name	Club	Date	Meet	Location	Ref
1	2:20.00	Paolo Costoli	Florentia	1930	-	Nice, France	
2	2:19.00	Giuseppe Gambetta	Florentia	1930	-	Nice, France	
3	2:18.10	Giuseppe Gambetta	GUF Torino	1938	-	Sanremo, Italy	
4	2:15.70	Giovanni Paliaga	R.N. Napoli	1950	-	Turin, Italy	
5	2:06.50	Angelo Romeni	Vis Sauro	1955	-	L'Aquila, Italy	
6	1:49.38	Paolo Revelli	Leonessa Brescia	1981	-	Gainesville, Florida, United States	
7	1:47.77	Paolo Revelli	Leonessa Brescia	1984	-	Ravenna, Italy	
8	1:46.93	Giorgio Lamberti	Leonessa Brescia	1987	-	Loano, Italy	
9	1:46.44	Giorgio Lamberti	Italy	1988	-	Bonn, Germany	
10	1:43.95	Giorgio Lamberti	Italy	1988	-	Bonn, Germany	
11	1:43.64	Giorgio Lamberti	Italy	1990	-	Bonn, Germany	
12	1:42.54	Filippo Magnini	Italy	Dec 2006	European Championships	Helsinki, Finland	
13	1:41.65	Filippo Magnini	Italy	13 Dec 2009	European Championships	Istanbul, Turkey	
14	1:41.61	Carlos D'Ambrosio	Fiamme Gialle - Fondazione Bentegodi	31 March 2025	Italian Youth Championships	Riccione, Italy	
15	1:41.60	Thomas Ceccon	Italy	25 October 2025	World Cup	Toronto, Canada	
16	1:40.69	Carlos D'Ambrosio	Fiamme Gialle	30 March 2026	Italian Youth Championships	Riccione, Italy	

Legend: # – Record awaiting ratification by Italian Swimming Federation; WR – World record; ER – European record;
Records not set in finals: h – heat; sf – semifinal; r – relay 1st leg; rh – relay heat 1st leg; b – B final; † – en route to final mark; tt – time trial

=== Women ===
#	Time		Name	Club	Date	Meet	Location	Ref
1	02:03.50		Monica Vallarin	Amici N. Firenze	1981	-	Turin, Italy	
2	02:02.95		Tanya Vannini	Amici N. Firenze	1983	-	Viareggio, Italy	
3	02:02.90		Carla Lasi	San Donato	1982	-	Castellanza, Italy	
4	02:00.90		Silvia Persi	Fiorentina N.	1984	-	Ravenna, Italy	
5	02:00.64		Tanya Vannini	Fiorentina N.	1986	-	Turin, Italy	
6	02:00.41		Tanya Vannini	Fiorentina N.	1987	-	Bonn, Germany	
7	01:59.55		Tanya Vannini	Fiorentina N.	1987	-	Bonn, Germany	
8	01:59.55		Cristina Chiuso	Fiorentina N.	2001	-	Imperia, Italy	
9	01:58.49		Simona Ricciardi	Fiamme Gialle	2002	-	Genoa, Italy	
10	01:57.19		Federica Pellegrini	DDS	2003	-	Genoa, Italy	
11	01:56.74		Federica Pellegrini	DDS	2003	-	Camogli, Italy	
12	01:56.15		Federica Pellegrini	DDS	2005	-	Trieste, Italy	
13	01:55.54		Federica Pellegrini	Nazionale	2005	-	Trieste, Italy	
14	01:55.15		Federica Pellegrini	Nazionale	2006	-	Shanghai, China	
15	01:51.85	WR	Federica Pellegrini	Nazionale	14 Dec 2008	European SC Championships	Rijeka, Croatia	

Legend: # – Record awaiting ratification by Italian Swimming Federation; WR – World record; ER – European record;
Records not set in finals: h – heat; sf – semifinal; r – relay 1st leg; rh – relay heat 1st leg; b – B final; † – en route to final mark; tt – time trial
