= Italy at the 1964 Summer Olympics =

- IOC code: ITA
- NOC: Italian National Olympic Committee

in Tokyo
- Competitors: 168 (157 men, 11 women) in 18 sports
- Flag bearer: Giuseppe Delfino
- Medals Ranked 5th: Gold 10 Silver 10 Bronze 7 Total 27

Summer Olympics appearances (overview)
- 1896; 1900; 1904; 1908; 1912; 1920; 1924; 1928; 1932; 1936; 1948; 1952; 1956; 1960; 1964; 1968; 1972; 1976; 1980; 1984; 1988; 1992; 1996; 2000; 2004; 2008; 2012; 2016; 2020; 2024

Other related appearances
- 1906 Intercalated Games

Italy, the previous host of the 1960 Summer Olympics in Rome, competed at the 1964 Summer Olympics in Tokyo, Japan. 168 competitors, 157 men and 11 women, took part in 91 events in 18 sports.

== Medalists ==
=== Gold ===
- Abdon Pamich — Athletics, Men's 50 km Walk
- Fernando Atzori — Boxing, Men's Flyweight
- Cosimo Pinto — Boxing, Men's Light Heavyweight
- Giovanni Pettenella — Cycling, Men's 1000m Sprint (Scratch)
- Mario Zanin — Cycling, Men's Individual Road Race
- Sergio Bianchetto and Angelo Damiano — Cycling, Men's 2000m Tandem
- Mauro Checcoli — Equestrian, Three-Day Event Individual
- Paolo Angioni, Mauro Checcoli, and Giuseppe Ravano — Equestrian, Three-Day Event Team
- Franco Menichelli — Gymnastics, Men's Floor Exercises
- Ennio Mattarelli — Shooting, Men's Trap Shooting

=== Silver ===
- Sergio Bianchetto — Cycling, Men's 1000m Sprint (Scratch)
- Giovanni Pettenella — Cycling, Men's 1000m Time Trial
- Giorgio Ursi — Cycling, Men's 4000m Individual Pursuit
- Cencio Mantovani, Carlo Rancati, Luigi Roncaglia, and Franco Testa — Cycling, Men's 4000m Team Pursuit
- Severino Andreoli, Luciano Dalla Bona, Pietro Guerra, and Ferruccio Manza — Cycling, Men's Team Road Race
- Klaus Dibiasi — Diving, Men's Platform
- Giovan Battista Breda, Giuseppe Delfino, Gianfranco Paolucci, Alberto Pellegrino, and Gianluigi Saccaro — Fencing, Men's Épée Team
- Giampaolo Calanchini, Wladimiro Calarese, Pier-Luigi Chicca, Mario Ravagnan, and Cesare Salvadori — Fencing, Men's Sabre Team
- Franco Menichelli — Gymnastics, Men's Rings
- Renato Bosatta, Franco De Pedrina, Giuseppe Galante, Giovanni Spinola, and Emilio Trivini — Rowing, Men's Coxed Fours

=== Bronze ===
- Salvatore Morale — Athletics, Men's 400m Hurdles
- Silvano Bertini — Boxing, Men's Welterweight
- Franco Valle — Boxing, Men's Middleweight
- Giuseppe Ros — Boxing, Men's Heavyweight
- Piero D'Inzeo, Raimondo D'Inzeo, and Graziano Mancinelli — Equestrian, Jumping Team
- Antonella Ragno-Lonzi — Fencing, Women's Foil Individual
- Franco Menichelli — Gymnastics, Men's Parallel Bars

== Athletics ==
=== Results ===
Men (22)
Athlete	Age	Event	Rank	Medal
Ito Giani	23	Men's 100 metres	4 h8 r1/4	
Livio Berruti	25	Men's 200 metres	5	
Sergio Ottolina	21	Men's 200 metres	8	
Sergio Bello	22	Men's 400 metres	6 h1 r2/4	
Francesco Bianchi	24	Men's 800 metres	5 h6 r1/3	
Francesco Bianchi	24	Men's 1,500 metres	7 h2 r1/3	
Eddy Ottoz	20	Men's 110 metres Hurdles	4	
Giovanni Cornacchia	25	Men's 110 metres Hurdles	7	
Giorgio Mazza	25	Men's 110 metres Hurdles	8	
Salvatore Morale	25	Men's 400 metres Hurdles	3	Bronze
Roberto Frinolli	23	Men's 400 metres Hurdles	6	
Livio Berruti	25	Men's 4 × 100 metres Relay	7	
Ennio Preatoni	19	Men's 4 × 100 metres Relay	7	
Sergio Ottolina	21	Men's 4 × 100 metres Relay	7	
Pasquale Giannattasio	23	Men's 4 × 100 metres Relay	7	
Bruno Bianchi	25	Men's 4 × 400 metres Relay	3 h2 r1/2	
Salvatore Morale	25	Men's 4 × 400 metres Relay	3 h2 r1/2	
Roberto Frinolli	23	Men's 4 × 400 metres Relay	3 h2 r1/2	
Sergio Bello	22	Men's 4 × 400 metres Relay	3 h2 r1/2	
Giorgio Jegher	27	Men's Marathon1	7	
Antonio Ambu	28	Men's Marathon	40	
Abdon Pamich	31	Men's 50 kilometres Walk	1	Gold
Mauro Bogliatto	21	Men's High Jump	16	
Carlo Lievore	26	Men's Javelin Throw	15 QR	
Renato Dionisi	16	Men's Pole Vault	25T QR	
Silvano Meconi	32	Men's Shot Put	17 QR	
Franco Sar	30	Men's Decathlon	13	
Women (1)
Athlete	Age	Event	Rank	Medal
Maria Vittoria Trio	16	Women's Long Jump	14	

== Basketball ==
Men's Team Competition

- Team Roster

- Gianfranco Bertini
- Sauro Bufalini
- Ottorino Flaborea
- Giovanni Gavagnin
- Augusto Giomo
- Gianfranco Lombardi
- Massimo Masini
- Giusto Pellanera
- Gianfranco Pieri
- Gianfranco Sardagna
- Gabriele Vianello
- Paolo Vittori

== Cycling ==
14 cyclists represented Italy in 1964.

Individual road race

- Mario Zanin
- Severino Andreoli
- Felice Gimondi
- Ferruccio Manza

Team time trial

- Severino Andreoli
- Luciano Dalla Bona
- Pietro Guerra
- Ferruccio Manza

Sprint

- Giovanni Pettenella
- Sergio Bianchetto

1000m time trial

- Giovanni Pettenella

Tandem

- Angelo Damiano
- Sergio Bianchetto

Individual pursuit

- Giorgio Ursi

Team pursuit

- Luigi Roncaglia
- Cencio Mantovani
- Carlo Rancati
- Franco Testa

== Diving ==
Men

Athlete	Event	Preliminary		Final			
Athlete	Event	Points	Rank	Points	Rank	Total	Rank
Franco Cagnotto	3 m springboard	89.54	10	Did not advance			
Klaus Dibiasi	3 m springboard	87.68	13	Did not advance			
Franco Cagnotto	10 m platform	83.23	23	Did not advance			
Klaus Dibiasi	10 m platform	97.62	1 Q	49.92	5	147.54	2nd place, silver medalist(s)

== Fencing ==
20 fencers, 15 men and 5 women, represented Italy in 1964.

Men's foil

- Mario Curletto
- Nicola Granieri
- Pasquale La Ragione

Men's team foil

- Gianguido Milanesi, Pasquale La Ragione, Arcangelo Pinelli, Nicola Granieri, Mario Curletto

Men's épée

- Gianluigi Saccaro
- Alberto Pellegrino
- Giuseppe Delfino

Men's team épée

- Giuseppe Delfino, Alberto Pellegrino, Gianluigi Saccaro, Gianfranco Paolucci, Giovanni Battista Breda

Men's sabre

- Pierluigi Chicca
- Cesare Salvadori
- Wladimiro Calarese

Men's team sabre

- Wladimiro Calarese, Giampaolo Calanchini, Pierluigi Chicca, Mario Ravagnan, Cesare Salvadori

Women's foil

- Antonella Ragno-Lonzi
- Giovanna Masciotta
- Bruna Colombetti-Peroncini

Women's team foil

- Antonella Ragno-Lonzi, Giovanna Masciotta, Irene Camber-Corno, Natalina Sanguinetti, Bruna Colombetti-Peroncini

== Modern pentathlon ==
One male pentathlete represented Italy in 1964.

Individual

- Alfonso Ottaviani

== Shooting ==
Five shooters represented Italy in 1964. Ennio Mattarelli won the gold medal in the trap event.

25 m pistol

- Giovanni Liverzani
- Ugo Amicosante

50 m pistol

- Ugo Simoni

Trap

- Ennio Mattarelli
- Galliano Rossini

== Swimming ==
Men

Athlete	Event	Heat		Semifinal		Final	
Athlete	Event	Time	Rank	Time	Rank	Time	Rank
Bruno Bianchi	100 m freestyle	56.8	=36	Did not advance			
Pietro Boscaini	100 m freestyle	55.8	=18 Q	56.1	20	Did not advance	
Sergio De Gregorio	100 m freestyle	56.8	=36	Did not advance			
Sergio De Gregorio	400 m freestyle	4:27.4	15	—N/a		Did not advance	
Giovanni Orlando	400 m freestyle	4:30.8	26	—N/a		Did not advance	
Pierpaolo Spangaro	400 m freestyle	4:30.0	=23	—N/a		Did not advance	
Ezio Della Savia	200 m backstroke	2:16.6	6 Q	2:18.4	13	Did not advance	
Dino Rora	200 m backstroke	2:17.8	=10 Q	2:16.7	9	Did not advance	
Cesare Caramelli	200 m breaststroke	2:40.9	21	Did not advance			
Gian Corrado Gross	200 m breaststroke	2:42.8	23	Did not advance			
Giampiero Fossati	200 m butterfly	2:17.2	16 Q	2:18.1	15	Did not advance	
Antonio Rastrelli	200 m butterfly	2:17.3	=17	Did not advance			
Sergio De Gregorio; Bruno Bianchi; Giovanni Orlando; Pietro Boscaini	4 × 200 m freestyle relay	8:17.8	7 Q	—N/a		8:18.1	8
Dino Rora; Gian Corrado Gross; Giampiero Fossati; Pietro Boscaini	4 × 100 m medley relay	4:09.3	6 Q	—N/a		4:10.3	7

Women

Athlete	Event	Heat		Semifinal		Final	
Athlete	Event	Time	Rank	Time	Rank	Time	Rank
Daniela Beneck	100 m freestyle	1:03.2	11 Q	1:02.9	=9	Did not advance	
Mara Sacchi	100 m freestyle	1:05.9	34	Did not advance			
Paola Saini	100 m freestyle	1:04.4	23	Did not advance			
Daniela Beneck	400 m freestyle	4:56.2	10	—N/a		Did not advance	
Anna Maria Cecchi	100 m butterfly	1:10.3	=11 Q	1:10.4	12	Did not advance	
Paola Saini; Maria Cristina Pacifici; Mara Sacchi; Daniela Beneck	4 × 100 m freestyle relay	4:15.0	8 Q	—N/a		4:17.2	8

== Water polo ==
Men's Team Competition

- Team Roster

- Danio Bardi
- Mario Cevasco
- Giuseppe d'Altrui
- Federico Dennerlein
- Giancarlo Guerrini
- Franco Lavoratori
- Gianni Lonzi
- Eugenio Merello
- Rosario Parmegiani
- Eraldo Pizzo
- Dante Rossi
- Alberto Spinola
