= Italian record progression 100 metres freestyle =

== Long course (50 m) ==
=== Men ===
#	Time		Name	Club	Date	Meet	Location	Ref
1	01:05.60		Emilio Polli	Canottieri Milan	1926	-	Budapest, Hungary	
2	01:05.20		Emilio Polli	Canottieri Milan	1927	-	Bologna, Italy	
3	01:03.40		Emilio Polli	Canottieri Milan	1928	-	Rome, Italy	
4	01:03.00		Siro Banchelli	Florentia	1931	-	Bologna, Italy	
5	01:00.00		Celio Brunelleschi	Florentia	1948	-	Florence, Italy	
6	00:59.50		Carlo Pedersoli	Lazio nuoto	1950	-	Salsomaggiore, Italy	
7	00:58.30		Paolo Pucci	Lazio nuoto	1956	-	Melbourne, Australia	
8	00:57.00		Paolo Pucci	Lazio nuoto	1957	-	Rome, Italy	
9	00:56.80		Paolo Pucci	Lazio nuoto	1958	-	Bologna, Italy	
10	00:56.30		Paolo Pucci	Lazio nuoto	1958	-	Budapest, Hungary	
11	00:56.10		Bruno Bianchi	Fiat ricambi	1954	-	Sanremo, Italy	
12	00:56.10		Paolo Pucci	Lazio nuoto	1958	-	Budapest, Hungary	
13	00:56.10		Paolo Pucci	Mys	1958	-	Budapest, Hungary	
14	00:55.80		Pietro Boscaini	Lazio nuoto	1964	-	Tokyo, Japan	
16	00:55.70		Pietro Boscaini	Lazio nuoto	1965	-	Sanremo, Italy	
17	00:55.40		Pietro Boscaini	Lazio nuoto	1965	-	Milan, Italy	
18	00:54.70		Pietro Boscaini	Lazio nuoto	1968	-	Milan, Italy	
19	00:54.60		Roberto Pangaro	Aniene	1970	-	Rome, Italy	
20	00:54.40		Roberto Pangaro	Aniene	1972	-	Syracuse, Sicily, Italy	
21	00:54.30		Roberto Pangaro	Aniene	1973	-	Dortmund, Germany	
22	00:54.06		Roberto Pangaro	Aniene	1973	-	Belgrade, Serbia	
23	00:53.87		Roberto Pangaro	Aniene	1974	-	Marseille, France	
24	00:53.60		Roberto Pangaro	Aniene	1974	-	Rome, Italy	
25	00:53.32		Roberto Pangaro	Aniene	1974	-	Vienna, Austria	
26	00:53.08		Roberto Pangaro	Aniene	1974	-	Vienna, Austria	
27	00:53.06		Roberto Pangaro	Aniene	1973	-	Belgrade, Serbia	
28	00:52.59		Roberto Pangaro	Aniene	1974	-	Vienna, Austria	
30	00:52.50		Marcello Guarducci	Rari Nantes Trento	1975	-	Cali, Italy	
31	00:52.50		Marcello Guarducci	Rari Nantes Trento	1975	-	Las Palmas, Spain	
32	00:51.57		Marcello Guarducci	Carabinieri	1976	-	Montreal, Italy	
33	00:51.35		Marcello Guarducci	Carabinieri	1976	-	Montreal, Canada	
34	00:51.25		Marcello Guarducci	Carabinieri	1977	-	Chiavari, Italy	
35	00:51.25		Marcello Guarducci	Dom	1977	-	Chiavari, Italy	
36	00:50.99		Marcello Guarducci	Nuoto Club verona	1983	-	Casablanca, Morocco	
37	00:50.97		Giorgio Lamberti	Leonessa brescia	1987	-	Rome, Italy	
38	00:50.82		Giorgio Lamberti	Leonessa brescia	1987	-	Catania, Italy	
39	00:50.55		Giorgio Lamberti	Leonessa brescia	1987	-	Strasbourg, France	
40	00:50.53		Giorgio Lamberti	Leonessa brescia	1987	-	Strasbourg, France	
41	00:50.47		Roberto Gleria	Leonessa brescia	1988	-	Florence, Italy	
42	00:50.41		Giorgio Lamberti	Leonessa brescia	1989	-	Genoa, Italy	
43	00:49.48		Giorgio Lamberti	Leonessa brescia	1989	-	Bonn, Germany	
44	00:49.42		Giorgio Lamberti	Leonessa brescia	1989	-	Bonn, Germany	
45	00:49.24	ER	Giorgio Lamberti	Fiamme gialle	August 1989	European Championships	Bonn, Germany	
46	00:49.23		Lorenzo Vismara	Fiamme gialle	2000	-	Sydney, Australia	
47	00:49.19		Filippo Magnini	Carabinieri	2003	-	Riccione, Italy	
48	00:49.12		Filippo Magnini	Rari Nantes Turin	2004	-	Livorno, Italy	
49	00:49.09		Filippo Magnini	Rari Nantes Turin	2004	-	Livorno, Italy	
50	00:48.87		Filippo Magnini	Rari Nantes Turin	2004	-	Madrid, Spain	
51	00:48.74		Filippo Magnini	Larus nuoto	2005	-	Riccione, Italy	
52	00:48.73		Filippo Magnini	Larus nuoto	2005	-	Montreal, Canada	
53	00:48.12		Filippo Magnini	Larus nuoto	2005	-	Montreal, Canada	
54	00:48.11		Filippo Magnini	Larus nuoto	13 August 2008	Olympic Games	Beijing, China	
55	00:48.04		Filippo Magnini	Larus nuoto	29 July 2009	World Championships	Rome, Italy	
56	00:47.81		Alessandro Miressi	National Team	18 May 2021	European Championships	Budapest, Hungary	
57	00:47.45		Alessandro Miressi	National Team	19 May 2021	European Championships	Budapest, Hungary	

Legend: # – Record awaiting ratification by Italian Swimming Federation; WR – World record; ER – European record;
Records not set in finals: h – heat; sf – semifinal; r – relay 1st leg; rh – relay heat 1st leg; b – B final; † – en route to final mark; so – swim-off; tt – time trial

=== Women ===
#	Time	Name	Club	Date	Meet	Location	Ref
1	1:35.40	Armida Ippavitz	Triestina Nuoto	1924	-	Milan, Italy	
2	1:32.80	Nerina Bravin	Triestina Nuoto	1927	-	Bologna, Italy	
3	1:24.40	M. Schwartz	Vis sauro	1928	-	Rome, Italy	
4	1:19.60	Anna Savi	Vis sauro	1929	-	Rome, Italy	
5	1:18.00	Ines Sulligi	Triestina Nuoto	1931	-	Rome, Italy	
6	1:17.20	Anna Savi	Vis sauro	1931	-	Bologna, Italy	
7	1:16.20	B. Lokar	Triestina Nuoto	1935	-	Sanremo, Italy	
8	1:15.80	Grazia Ruzier	N/a	1935	-	Milan, Italy	
9	1:15.60	B. Lokar	N/a	1935	-	Genoa, Italy	
10	1:14.00	B. Lokar	N/a	1937	-	Trieste, Italy	
11	1:13.70	B. Lokar	N/a	1939	-	Milan, Italy	
12	1:12.30	B. Lokar	N/a	1939	-	Trieste, Italy	
13	1:12.00	B. Lokar	N/a	1939	-	Trieste, Italy	
14	1:11.70	B. Lokar	N/a	1939	-	Trieste, Italy	
15	1:09.80	Dragusa Gamacchio Finc	Rari Nantes Naples	1950	-	Levanto, Liguria, Italy	
16	1:09.50	Dragusa Gamacchio Finc	Rari Nantes Naples	1950	-	Genoa, Italy	
17	1:09.40	Romana Calligaris	Rari Nantes Naples	1952	-	Turin, Italy	
18	1:09.30	Sandra Valle	Rari Nantes Naples	1956	-	Naples, Italy	
19	1:09.10	Sandra Valle	Rari Nantes Naples	1957	-	Genoa, Italy	
20	1:08.80	Romana Calligaris	Rari Nantes Naples	1952	-	Genoa, Italy	
21	1:08.70	Sandra Valle	Rari Nantes Naples	1957	-	Genoa, Italy	
22	1:08.60	Sandra Valle	Rari Nantes Naples	1958	-	Split, Croatia	
23	1:08.40	Maria Cristina Pacifici	N/a	1959	-	Rome, Italy	
24	1:08.30	Paola Saini	N/a	1959	-	Genoa, Italy	
25	1:07.70	Maria Cristina Pacifici	N/a	1959	-	Genoa, Italy	
26	1:07.70	Paola Saini	N/a	1960	-	Rome, Italy	
27	1:06.70	Paola Saini	N/a	1960	-	Rome, Italy	
28	1:05.70	Paola Saini	N/a	1960	-	Rome, Italy	
29	1:05.30	Paola Saini	N/a	1960	-	Milan, Italy	
30	1:04.40	Paola Saini	N/a	1960	-	Rome, Italy	
31	1:04.00	Daniela Beneck	N/a	1962	-	Rome, Italy	
32	1:03.50	Paola Saini	N/a	1962	-	Moscow, Russia	
33	1:02.90	Daniela Beneck	Nuoto Club Milan	1964	-	Tokyo, Italy	
34	1:02.60	Daniela Beneck	Nuoto Club Milan	1965	-	Rome, Italy	
35	1:02.50	Daniela Beneck	Nuoto Club Milan	1965	-	Rome, Italy	
36	1:02.40	Daniela Beneck	Nuoto Club Milan	1966	-	Utrecht, Netherlands	
37	1:02.30	Mara Sacchi	Nuoto Club Milan	1968	-	Sanremo, Italy	
38	1:02.20	Novella Calligaris	Rari Nantes patavium	1970	-	Barcelona, Spain	
39	1:02.00	Novella Calligaris	Rari Nantes patavium	1971	-	İzmir, Turkey	
40	1:01.80	Novella Calligaris	Rari Nantes patavium	1972	-	Berlin, Germany	
41	1:01.40	Laura Podestà	Geas Sesto San Giovanni	1973	-	Milan, Italy	
42	1:01.38	Laura Podestà	Geas Sesto San Giovanni	1973	-	Belgrade, Italy	
43	1:01.36	Laura Podestà	Geas Sesto San Giovanni	1973	-	Belgrade, Hungary	
44	1:01.02	Laura Podestà	Geas Sesto San Giovanni	1973	-	Belgrade, Hungary	
45	1:00.50	Cinzia Savi Scarponi	N/A	1977	-	Pescara, Italy	
46	1:00.47	Cinzia Savi scarponi	N/a	1977	-	Chiavari, Italy	
47	59.97	Cinzia Savi scarponi	N/a	1977	-	Chiavari, Italy	
48	59.59	Cinzia Savi scarponi	N/a	1978	-	Rome, Italy	
49	59.55	Cinzia Savi scarponi	N/a	1978	-		
50	59.52	Cinzia Savi scarponi	N/a	1978	-	Milan, Italy	
51	59.10	Monica Vallarin	SNAM	1980	-	Piacenza, Italy	
52	58.62	Silvia Persi	SNAM	1981	-	Split, Croatia	
53	58.60	Silvia Persi	SNAM	1980	-	Udine, Italy	
54	58.45	Silvia Persi	SNAM	1983	-	Palermo, Italy	
55	57.98	Silvia Persi	SNAM	1983	-	Rome, Italy	
56	57.62	Silvia Persi	SNAM	1984	-	Los Angeles, United States	
57	57.24	Silvia Persi	SNAM	1984	-	Los Angeles, United States	
58	57.13	Silvia Persi	SNAM	1987	-	Catania, Italy	
59	57.08	Silvia Persi	SNAM	1987	-	Strasbourg, France	
60	56.97	Silvia Persi	SNAM	1989	-	Bonn, Germany	
61	56.84	Viviana Susin	SNAM	July 10, 1997	-	San Donato Milanese, Italy	
62	56.70	Cristina Chiuso	SNAM	2000	-	Rome, Italy	
63	56.37	Luisa Striani	SNAM	2000	-	Monfalcone, Italy	
64	56.10	Cecilia Vianini	DDS	2000	-	Sydney, Australia	
65	55.96	Cecilia Vianini	DDS	2000	-	Sydney, Australia	
66	55.80	Cecilia Vianini	DDS	2001	-	Fukuoka, Japan	
67	55.07	Cecilia Vianini	DDS	2001	-	Genoa, Italy	
68	54.40	Federica Pellegrini	DDS	March 10, 2004	-	Livorno, Italy	
69	53.55	Federica Pellegrini	Canottieri Aniene	March 7, 2009	-	Riccione, Italy	
70	53.18	Federica Pellegrini	C.C. Aniene	25 June 2016	Sette Colli Trophy	Rome, Italy	
71	53.01	Sara Curtis	CS Roero	15 April 2025	Italian Championships	Riccione, Italy	
72	52.69	Sara Curtis	Italy	27 June 2026	Sette Colli Trophy	Rome, Italy	

Legend: # – Record awaiting ratification by Italian Swimming Federation; WR – World record; ER – European record;
Records not set in finals: h – heat; sf – semifinal; r – relay 1st leg; rh – relay heat 1st leg; b – B final; † – en route to final mark; so – swim-off; tt – time trial

== Short course (25 m) ==
=== Men ===
#	Time		Name	Club	Date	Meet	Location	Ref
1	01:02.10		Cappelini	T.c. Milan	1933	-	Turin, Italy	
2	00:58.20		Carlo Pedersoli	Lazio nuoto	1952	-	Turin, Italy	
3	00:57.20		Angelo Romani	Vis sauro	1955	-	L'Aquila, Italy	
4	00:50.04		Marcello Guarducci	Carabinieri	1980	-	Antibes, France	
5	00:49.97		Marcello Guarducci	Nuoto Club verona	1984	-	Bonn, Germany	
6	00:49.68		Giovanni Franceschi	Fiamme Oro roma	1986	-	Turin, Italy	
7	00:49.60		Andrea Ceccarini	Termili	1987	-	Rome, Italy	
8	00:49.30		Giorgio Lamberti	Leonessa brescia	1987	-	Verona, Italy	
9	00:49.10		Giorgio Lamberti	Leonessa brescia	1988	-	Brescia, Italy	
10	00:48.76		Giorgio Lamberti	Leonessa brescia	1990	-	Rome, Italy	
11	00:48.64		Lorenzo Vismara	Fiamme gialle	1998	-	Sydney, Australia	
12	00:48.50		Lorenzo Vismara	Fiamme gialle	2002	-	Riesa, Germany	
13	00:48.25		Lorenzo Vismara	Fiamme gialle	2002	-	Riesa, Germany	
14	00:47.33		Lorenzo Vismara	Larus nuoto	2002	-	Riesa, Germany	
15	00:47.32		Filippo Magnini	Larus nuoto	2003	-	Dublin, Ireland	
16	00:47.07		Filippo Magnini	Larus nuoto	2005	-	Viareggio, Italy	
17	00:46.55		Filippo Magnini	National Team	2005	-	Trieste, Italy	
18	00:46.52		Filippo Magnini	National Team	2005	-	Trieste, Italy	
19	00:46.49	h	Filippo Magnini	National Team	12 December 2008	European Championships	Rijeka, Croatia	
20	00:46.37	sf	Filippo Magnini	National Team	12 December 2008	European Championship	Rijeka, Croatia	
21	00:45.90		Alessandro Miressi	National Team	8 December 2019	European Championships	Glasgow, Great Britain	
22	00:45.84		Alessandro Miressi	National Team	7 November 2021	European Championships	Kazan, Russia	
23	00:45.58		Alessandro Miressi	National Team	20 December 2021	World Championships	Abu Dhabi, United Arab Emirates	
24	00:45.57		Alessandro Miressi	National Team	21 December 2021	World Championships	Abu Dhabi, United Arab Emirates	

Legend: # – Record awaiting ratification by Italian Swimming Federation; WR – World record; ER – European record;
Records not set in finals: h – heat; sf – semifinal; r – relay 1st leg; rh – relay heat 1st leg; b – B final; † – en route to final mark; so – swim-off; tt – time trial

=== Women ===
#	Time		Name	Club	Date	Meet	Location	Ref
1	57.62		Silvia Persi	Larus nuoto	1982	-	Gothenburg, Sweden	
2	57.60		Silvia Persi	Larus nuoto	1984	-	Rome, Italy	
3	57.12		Silvia Persi	Larus nuoto	1984	-	Paris, France	
4	56.58		Silvia Persi	Larus nuoto	1984	-	Paris, France	
5	56.53		Silvia Persi	Larus nuoto	1986	-	Turin, Italy	
6	56.32		Silvia Persi	Larus nuoto	1986	-	Turin, Italy	
7	56.31		Silvia Persi	Larus nuoto	1986	-	Malmö, Sweden	
8	56.27		Silvia Persi	Larus nuoto	1987	-	Paris, France	
9	56.14		Silvia Persi	Larus nuoto	1987	-	Loano, Italy	
10	56.12		Cristina Chiuso	Larus nuoto	1998	-	Paris, France	
11	56.00		Cristina Chiuso	Larus nuoto	1998	-	Paris, France	
12	55.87		Luisa Striani	Larus nuoto	1999	-	Desenzano, Italy	
13	55.43		Cristina Chiuso	Aurelia nuoto	2000	-	Valencia, Spain	
14	55.03		Cristina Chiuso	Aurelia nuoto	2000	-	Valencia, Spain	
15	55.03		Cristina Chiuso	Aurelia nuoto	2001	-	Avezzano, Italy	
16	54.92		Cristina Chiuso	Aurelia nuoto	2001	-	Imperia, Italy	
17	54.37		Federica Pellegrini	DDS	2003	-	Viareggio, Italy	
18	53.89		Federica Pellegrini	DDS	19 December 2003	-	Camogli, Italy	
19	53.71		Renata Spagnolo	-	25 April 2009	Italian Club Championships	Rome, Italy	
20	52.86		Federica Pellegrini	Circolo Canottieri Aniene	23 November 2013	Gran Premio d'Italia	Viareggio, Italy	
21	52.70	r	Erika Ferraioli	Italy	5 December 2014	World Championships	Doha, Qatar	
22	52.56		Federica Pellegrini	Italy	4 December 2015	European Championships	Netanya, Israel	
23	52.17		Federica Pellegrini	Circolo Canottieri Aniene	24 April 2016	Italian Championships	Riccione, Italy	
24	52.10		Federica Pellegrini	Circolo Canottieri Aniene	7 April 2019	Coppa Caduti di Brema	Riccione, Italy	
24	51.26		Sara Curtis	Italy	6 December 2025	European Championships	Lublin, Poland	

Legend: # – Record awaiting ratification by Italian Swimming Federation; WR – World record; ER – European record;
Records not set in finals: h – heat; sf – semifinal; r – relay 1st leg; rh – relay heat 1st leg; b – B final; † – en route to final mark; so – swim-off; tt – time trial
