= Italian record progression 50 metres freestyle =

== Long course (50 m) ==
=== Men ===
#	Time		Name	Club	Date	Meet	Location	Ref
1	23.51		Marcello Guarducci	Lib. pescara	1981	-	Turin, Italy	
2	23.46		Giovanni Franceschi	Nuot. milanesi	1986	-	Città di Castello, Italy	
3	23.14		Giovanni Franceschi	Nuot. milanesi	1987	-	Strasbourg, France	
4	23.12		René Gusperti	Rari Nantes Trento	1990	-	Rome, Italy	
5	23.07		René Gusperti	Fiamme gialle	1991	-	Athens, Greece	
6	22.85		René Gusperti	Fiamme gialle	1992	-	Rome, Italy	
7	22.83		René Gusperti	Fiamme gialle	1995	-	Vienna, Austria	
8	22.77		René Gusperti	Fiamme gialle	1995	-	Vienna, Austria	
9	22.53		Lorenzo Vismara	Fiamme gialle	1998	-	Livorno, Italy	
10	22.48		Giovanni Franceschi	Fiamme gialle	1987	-	Loano, Italy	
11	22.46		René Gusperti	Fiamme gialle	1995	-	Livorno, Italy	
12	22.40		René Gusperti	Fiamme gialle	1997	-	Espoo, Finland	
13	22.40		Lorenzo Vismara	Fiamme gialle	1998	-	Livorno, Italy	
14	22.40		Lorenzo Vismara	Fiamme gialle	1999	-	Istanbul, Turkey	
15	22.21		Lorenzo Vismara	Fiamme gialle	1999	-	Istanbul, Turkey	
16	22.06		Lorenzo Vismara	Fiamme gialle	12 August 1999	World Military Games	Zagreb, Croatia	
17	22.03		Marco Orsi	CN Uisp Bologna	6 March 2009	Italian Championships	Riccione, Italy	
18	22.01		Federico Bocchia	Esercito	6 March 2009	Italian Championships	Riccione, Italy	
19	21.82		Marco Orsi	CN Uisp Bologna	6 March 2009	Italian Championships	Riccione, Italy	
20	21.64		Marco Orsi	GS Fiamme Oro Roma	20 December 2014	Italian Championships	Riccione, Italy	
21	21.37	sf	Andrea Vergani	Italy	8 August 2018	European Championships	Glasgow, Great Britain	

Legend: # – Record awaiting ratification by Italian Swimming Federation; WR – World record; ER – European record;
Records not set in finals: h – heat; sf – semifinal; r – relay 1st leg; rh – relay heat 1st leg; b – B final; † – en route to final mark; so – swim-off; tt – time trial

=== Women ===
#	Time		Name	Club	Date	Meet	Location	Ref
1	27.32		Silvia Persi	Aurelia nuoto	1983	-	Rome, Italy	
2	26.93		Silvia Persi	Aurelia nuoto	1984	-	Bari, Italy	
3	26.62		Silvia Persi	Aurelia nuoto	1984	-	Bari, Italy	
4	26.34		Silvia Persi	Aurelia nuoto	1986	-	Città di Castello, Italy	
5	26.33		Viviana Susin	Aurelia nuoto	1997	-	Rome, Italy	
6	26.29		Viviana Susin	Aurelia nuoto	1997	-	Rome, Italy	
7	26.26		Viviana Susin	Aurelia nuoto	1997	-	San Donato Milanese, Italy	
8	26.22		Cristina Chiuso	Aurelia nuoto	1998	-	Rome, Italy	
9	25.97		Cristina Chiuso	Aurelia nuoto	1998	-	Rome, Italy	
10	25.95		Cristina Chiuso	Aurelia nuoto	1998	-	Rome, Italy	
11	25.95		Cristina Chiuso	Aurelia nuoto	1999	-	Palma de Mallorca, Spain	
12	25.79		Cristina Chiuso	Aurelia nuoto	2000	-	Helsinki, Finland	
13	25.57		Cristina Chiuso	Aurelia nuoto	2002	-	Brescia, Italy	
14	25.47		Federica Pellegrini	Dds	2004	-	Livorno, Italy	
15	25.37		Cristina Chiuso	Aurelia nuoto	2004	-	Athens, Greece	
16	25.25		Cristina Chiuso	Aurelia nuoto	2006	-	Riccione, Italy	
17	25.18		Cristina Chiuso	Aurelia nuoto	5 August 2006	-	Budapest, Hungary	
18	24.84		Silvia Di Pietro	Italy	24 August 2014	European Championships	Berlin, Germany	
19	24.72	sf	Silvia Di Pietro	Italy	15 August 2022	European Championships	Rome, Italy	
20	24.56	h	Sara Curtis	CS Roero	8 March 2024	Italian Championships	Riccione, Italy	
21	24.43		Sara Curtis	CS Roero	16 April 2025	Italian Championships	Riccione, Italy	
22	24.41	h	Sara Curtis	Italy	2 August 2025	World Championships	Singapore, Singapore	
23	24.29	h	Sara Curtis	Centro Sportivo Esercito	17 April 2026	Italian Championships	Riccione, Italy	
24	24.09		Sara Curtis	Italy	28 June 2026	Sette Colli Trophy	Rome, Italy	

Legend: # – Record awaiting ratification by Italian Swimming Federation; WR – World record; ER – European record;
Records not set in finals: h – heat; sf – semifinal; r – relay 1st leg; rh – relay heat 1st leg; b – B final; † – en route to final mark; so – swim-off; tt – time trial

== Short course (25 m) ==
=== Men ===
#	Time	Name	Club	Date	Meet	Location	Ref
1	00:23.21	Marcello Guarducci	Carabinieri	1979	-	Italy	
2	00:23.19	Marcello Guarducci	N.Cristina verona	1984	-	Bonn, Germany	
3	00:23.03	Marcello Guarducci	N.Cristina verona	1985	-	Loano, Italy	
4	00:22.85	Giovanni Franceschi	Ff.oo.roma	1966	-	Turin, Italy	
5	00:22.84	Marcello Marini	Veneziana nuoto	1986	-	Turin, Italy	
6	00:22.64	Giovanni Franceschi	Ff.oo.roma	1986	-	Turin, Italy	
7	00:22.04	Lorenzo Vismara	Fiamme gialle	1998	-	Sydney, Australia	
8	00:21.86	Lorenzo Vismara	Fiamme gialle	1998	-	Sydney, Australia	
9	00:21.83	Lorenzo Vismara	Fiamme gialle	1999	-	Lisbon, Portugal	
10	00:21.76	Lorenzo Vismara	Fiamme gialle	2002	-	Riesa, Germany	
11	00:21.66	Lorenzo Vismara	Fiamme gialle	2002	-	Riesa, Germany	
12	00:21.49	Lorenzo Vismara	Fiamme gialle	2002	-	Camogli, Italy	
18	00:21.10	Mattia Nalesso	Carabinieri	30 Nov 2008	Winter Italian Championships	Genoa, Italy	

Legend: # – Record awaiting ratification by Italian Swimming Federation; WR – World record; ER – European record;
Records not set in finals: h – heat; sf – semifinal; r – relay 1st leg; rh – relay heat 1st leg; b – B final; † – en route to final mark; so – swim-off; tt – time trial

=== Women ===
#	Time		Name	Club	Date	Meet	Location	Ref
1	26.38		Silvia Persi	Cometal	1984	-	Ravenna, Italy	
2	26.22		Silvia Persi	Cometal	1984	-	Ravenna, Italy	
3	26.16		Silvia Persi	Cometal	1985	-	Loano, Italy	
4	25.98		Silvia Persi	Cometal	1987	-	Loano, Italy	
5	25.86		Viviana Susin	Cometal	1996	-	Rostock, Germany	
6	25.69		Viviana Susin	Cometal	1997	-	Imperia, Italy	
7	25.69		Lara Consolandi	Cometal	1998	-	Imperia, Italy	
8	25.68		Cristina Chiuso	Aurelia nuoto	1998	-	Paris, France	
9	25.63		Viviana Susin	Aurelia nuoto	1999	-	Imperia, Italy	
10	25.59		Cristina Chiuso	Aurelia nuoto	2000	-	València, Spain	
11	25.48		Cristina Chiuso	Aurelia nuoto	2000	-	Desenzano, Italy	
12	25.39		Cristina Chiuso	Aurelia nuoto	2001	-	Avezzano, Italy	
13	25.31		Cristina Chiuso	Aurelia nuoto	2001	-	Imperia, Italy	
14	25.10		Cristina Chiuso	Aurelia nuoto	2002	-	Camogli, Italy	
15	25.09		Cristina Chiuso	Aurelia nuoto	2003	-	Camogli, Italy	
16	24.86		Cristina Chiuso	Aurelia nuoto	2005	-	Trieste, Italy	
17	24.68		Cristina Chiuso	Aurelia nuoto	2005	-	Trieste, Italy	
18	24.37		Cristina Chiuso	Nazionale	11 December 2005	-	Trieste, Italy	
19	24.09		Erika Ferraioli	National Team	7 December 2014	World Championships	Doha, Qatar	
20	24.03	r	Silvia Di Pietro	National Team	4 December 2015	European Championships	Netanya, Israel	
21	23.90		Silvia Di Pietro	National Team	11 December 2016	World Championships	Windsor, Canada	
22	23.85		Silvia Di Pietro	Circolo Canottieri Aniene	24 April 2021	Regional Championships	Pietralata, Italy	
23	23.83		Silvia Di Pietro	Circolo Canottieri Aniene	23 December 2022	Coppa Caduti di Brema	Rome, Italy	
24	23.77		Sara Curtis	Centro Sportivo Esercito	16 November 2024	Italian Championships	Riccione, Italy	
25	23.68	sf	Silvia Di Pietro	Italy	14 December 2024	World Championships	Budapest, Hungary	
26	23.39	r	Silvia Di Pietro	Italy	2 December 2025	European Championships	Lublin, Poland	

Legend: # – Record awaiting ratification by Italian Swimming Federation; WR – World record; ER – European record;
Records not set in finals: h – heat; sf – semifinal; r – relay 1st leg; rh – relay heat 1st leg; b – B final; † – en route to final mark; so – swim-off; tt – time trial
