= Antonio Rastrelli =

Antonio Rastrelli may refer to:

- Antonio Rastrelli (politician) (1927–2019), Italian politician and lawyer
- Antonio Rastrelli (swimmer) (born 1945), Italian Olympic swimmer
