= Castagnetti =

Castagnetti is an Italian surname. Notable people with the surname include:

- Alberto Castagnetti (1943–2009), Italian swimmer and coach
- Michele Castagnetti (born 1989), Italian footballer
- Pierluigi Castagnetti (born 1945), Italian politician
