= Anna Beneck =

Italian swimmer

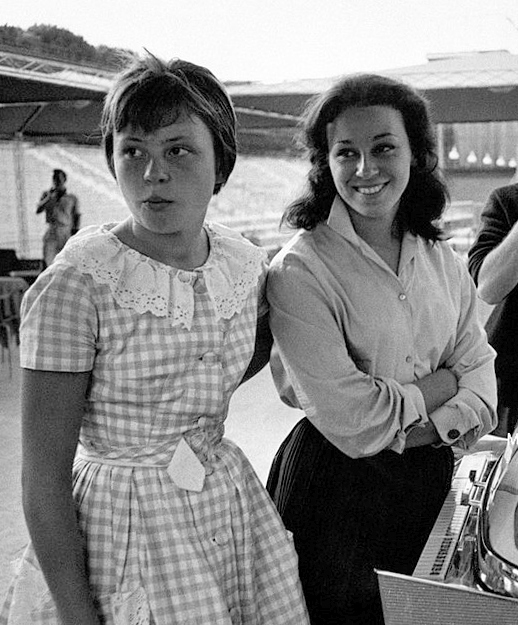
- Daniela and Anna Beneck (right) at the 1960 Olympics

Personal information
- Born: 23 June 1942 Turin, Italy
- Died: 3 September 2013 (aged 71)
- Height: 1.70 m (5 ft 7 in)
- Weight: 59 kg (130 lb)

Sport
- Sport: Swimming

Anna Beneck (23 June 1942 – 3 September 2013) was an Italian butterfly swimmer. She competed at the 1960 Olympics in the 100 m butterfly and 4 × 100 m medley relay, but was eliminated in the preliminaries. Beneck was married to Salvatore Morale, who ran 400 m hurdles at the 1960 Olympics. Her sister Daniela was her teammate in the 1960 swimming team, she married Roberto Frinolli, also an Olympic 400 m hurdler.
