= Lufthansa Flight 005 =

1966 aviation accident

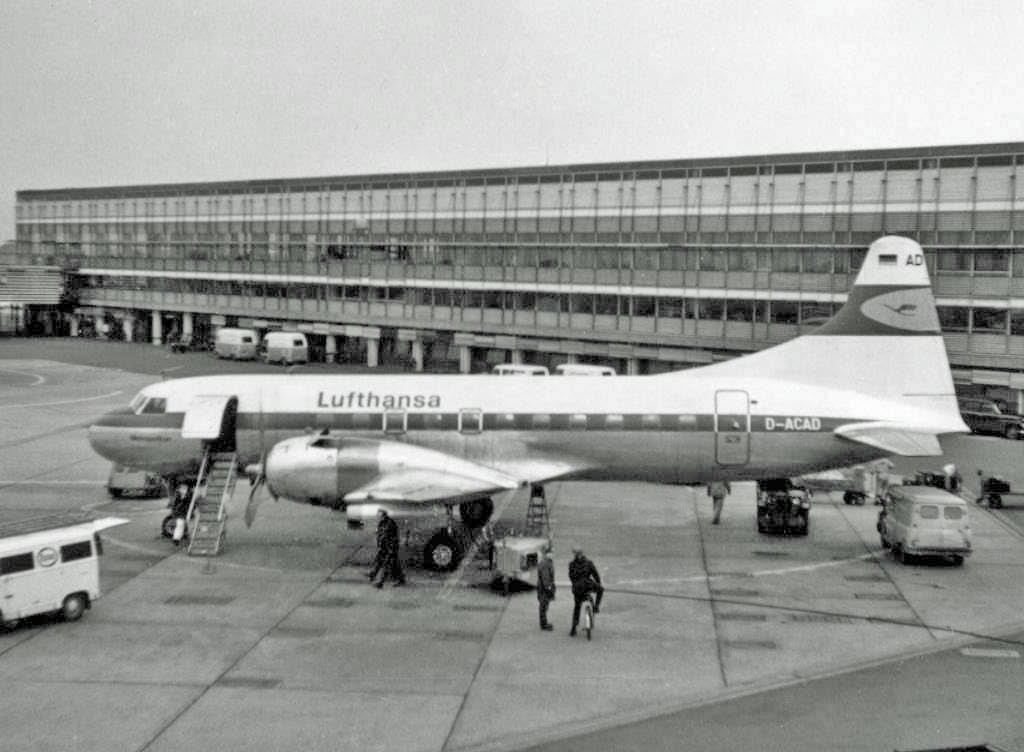
- A Lufthansa Convair CV 440 similar to the aircraft involved

Accident
- Date: 28 January 1966
- Summary: Stall during go-around
- Site: Bremen Airport; 53.045935°N 8.773699°E

Aircraft
- Aircraft type: Convair CV 440
- Operator: Lufthansa
- IATA flight No.: LH005
- ICAO flight No.: DHL005
- Call sign: LUFTHANSA 005
- Registration: D-ACAT
- Flight origin: Frankfurt International Airport, Frankfurt, West Germany
- Stopover: Bremen Airport, Bremen, West Germany
- Destination: Hamburg Airport, Hamburg, West Germany
- Occupants: 46
- Passengers: 42
- Crew: 4
- Fatalities: 46
- Survivors: 0

Lufthansa Flight 005 was a scheduled flight en route from Frankfurt to Hamburg with a stopover in Bremen. The aircraft crashed just beyond the runway in Bremen just before 19:00 on 28 January 1966, in a go-around after an aborted landing. All occupants — 42 passengers and 4 crew members — died in the accident.

== General ==
Among others, seven swimmers from the Italy national swimming team, their coach, and an Italian reporter were on board the 53-passenger aircraft. The actress Ada Tschechowa, daughter of Olga Chekhova and mother of Vera Tschechowa, was also one of the victims.

== Sequence of events ==
The flight departed Frankfurt Airport on runway 25R at 5:41 PM after a slight delay of 8 minutes. The aircraft's weight at takeoff was 22,148 kilograms (24.414 short tons), only slightly under the maximum of 22,544 kilograms (24.851 short tons). The Convair CV-440 was fueled with 3,200 litres (850 US gal) of aviation gasoline, sufficient for a flight of 5 hours, 13 minutes. This extra reserve was necessary because the crew had chosen Stuttgart Airport as their alternate destination due to poor weather conditions.

At about 18:40, after about 30 minutes cruising at Flight Level 140 (14,000 ft or 4,300 m), the flight began its approach from the east to runway 27 at the Bremen Airport. The temperature was 4 degrees Celsius and the ceiling was less than 100 m (300 ft). The visibility was only approximately 700 m (2,300 ft) because of heavy rains. Wind speed was 9 knots from 140 degrees. The resulting tailwind affecting the aircraft was 6 knots. The minimum weather conditions at the Bremen Airport for that Convair 440 aircraft type permitted a tailwind of no more than 5 knots.

Capitan Heinz Saalfeld began his final descent, but commenced a go-around maneuver at an approximate height of 10 m (30 ft) above the ground. A few moments later, at 6:51 pm, the 21.5-ton aircraft spun to the left and crashed into a field 400 metres (1,300 ft) beyond the end of the runway. The remaining fuel (approximately 2,500 litres or 660 US gallons) ignited, causing a ground fire that was extinguished by the airport's Fire and Rescue only after 40 minutes.

At the time, the accident was the fourth total loss of a Lufthansa aircraft since the company's reestablishment in 1954: after the crash of a Lockheed Super Constellation on 11 January 1959 during approach at Rio de Janeiro–Galeão International Airport, the airline had also lost two Boeing 720-030B during training flights over West Germany in 1961 and 1964.

== Causes ==
After the accident, an investigative commission was formed. The commission released its final report about a year later, concluding that the crash was caused by a chain of technical and human errors.

According to the report, an instrument in the cockpit displayed false information, causing the aircraft to deviate from the prescribed flight path specified by the instrument landing system, flying above its glide path. As the aircraft broke free of the cloud cover and switched from instrument controlled flight to visual control, the captain presumably estimated the altitude incorrectly due to darkness and poor visibility, causing the aircraft to come in too far, which made the final approach too late. The captain decided to abort because the little remaining runway would not have been sufficient to allow for braking the aircraft. At this point, he maneuvered the Convair into an extreme flight attitude, leading to a stall and the aircraft striking the ground with its left wing first. The aircraft burned completely except for the tail section and the right wing. When the rescue team arrived they could only sort through the wreckage.

According to an article in the German magazine Der Spiegel, the aircraft was considerably iced over and the pilot's visibility almost impossible. According to the accident report, it could not be ruled out that during the critical landing phase the pilot suffered from a cardiovascular disorder, precluding him from being able to control the aircraft any longer. He could not control the further progress of the flight on account of the rather poor stall performance of the aircraft type, the extraordinary difficulties to control a stall during instrument flight conditions, and the insufficient height available for transition from a stall to a normal attitude after the aircraft. The copilot could not level off the aircraft because of the very low altitude. The report ended with the sentence, "Other causes could also have contributed to the accident."

A pathological examination of the pilot's remains was not possible. An examination of the copilot's body, however, revealed a blood alcohol content of 0.24 per mil.

== Aircraft ==
The Convair Metropolitan 440, built in 1958, was operated from 18 July 1958 by the Deutsche Flugdienst Company (renamed Condor Flugdienst 1 November 1961). It carried the registration D-ADAD. On 7 November 1961 Lufthansa took control of the aircraft with the new designation D-ACAT. At the time of the accident, the aircraft had logged 13,872 hours of flight time (see also- Kreuzer, H. -Absturz: total flight time- 12,218). The aircraft was not equipped with a flight data recorder.

== Memorial ==
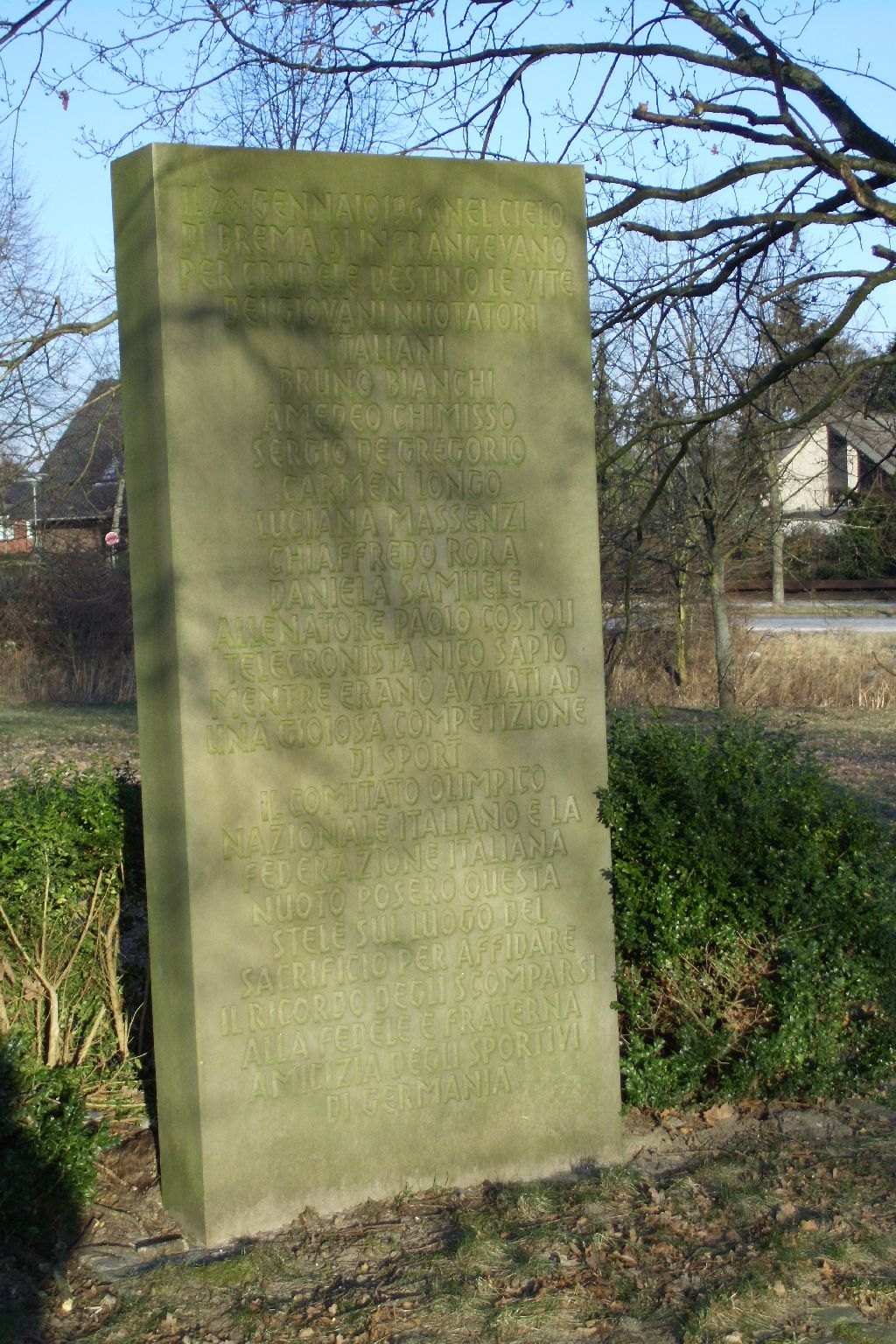
Italian stone monument not far from the crash site in Bremen, February 2012

The following Italian swimmers were among the victims:

- Luciana Massenzi, 20, national backstroke champion.
- Carmen Longo, 19, national breaststroke champion.
- Amedeo Chimisso, 19, who died in the year of his international debut.
- Paolo Costoli, coach and national champion in freestyle (200m to 1,500m) in 1929, 1930, 1931, 1932, 1934, 1935, 1937 and 1938. In 1931, he took bronze over 1,500m at the European Championships behind Oliver Hallassy (HUN), and in 1934 at the same event claimed two silvers, over 400 and 1,500m behind Jean Taris (FRA). Costoli was a pioneer as far as Italian swimming success was concerned.
- Bruno Bianchi was national sprint freestyle champion (100 and 200m). In the month of his 17th birthday, he competed at the 1960 home Rome Olympic Games and raced again at the Tokyo Games in 1964. In 1965, he led the Italian team to a first victory at the Six Nations, ahead, for the first time, of France, Sweden and Great Britain.
- Chiaffredo 'Dino' Rora, 21, was a freestyle and backstroke national champion and held the European 100m backstroke record in 1963. He was a medal hope for the Utrecht European Championships before his untimely death.
- Daniela Samuele, 17, was national junior butterfly champion.
- Sergio de Gregorio, 20, national champion over 200, 400 and 1,500m freestyle. He was racing 200m times in 1965 worthy of making the 1968 Olympic final, and was the first Italian under 18mins over 1,500m.

In memory, the Italian National Olympic Committee and the Italian Swimming Association raised a stone monument not far from the crash site on Norderländer St. in Bremen in the name of the Italians killed.

Francesco Zarzana directed the documentary Tra le onde, nel cielo on the 50th anniversary of the incident.

== See also ==
- List of accidents involving sports teams
- China Airlines Flight 140, another aircraft that stalled during an attempted go around.
