= Federico Colbertaldo =

Italian swimmer (born 1988)

Personal information
- Full name: Federico Colbertaldo
- Nationality: Italy
- Born: 17 October 1988 (age 37) Valdobbiadene, Treviso
- Height: 1.82 m (6 ft 0 in)
- Weight: 67 kg (148 lb; 10.6 st)

Sport
- Sport: Swimming
- Strokes: Freestyle
- Club: Montebelluna Nuoto
Medal record
Men's swimming
Representing Italy
World Championships (LC)
Bronze medal – third place	2007 Melbourne	800 m freestyle
European Championships (SC)
Gold medal – first place	2008 Rijeka	1500 m freestyle
Gold medal – first place	2010 Eindhoven	1500 m freestyle
Silver medal – second place	2009 Istanbul	1500 m freestyle
Silver medal – second place	2010 Eindhoven	400 m freestyle
Bronze medal – third place	2007 Debrecen	1500 m freestyle
Mediterranean Games
Silver medal – second place	2009 Pescara	1500 m freestyle
Universiade
Silver medal – second place	2009 Belgrade	800 m freestyle
Bronze medal – third place	2009 Belgrade	400 m freestyle
Bronze medal – third place	2009 Belgrade	1500 m freestyle

Federico Colbertaldo (born 17 October 1988) is an Italian freestyle swimmer.

In 2006, Colbertaldo was Junior European Champion in 400 m freestyle and won the silver medal in 200 m and 1500 m of the same stroke.

He represented Italy at the 2007 World Aquatics Championships swimming 800 m freestyle and winning the bronze medal.

== See also ==
- Italian record progression 400 metres freestyle
- Italian record progression 800 metres freestyle
