= Paolo Pucci =

Italian swimmer and water polo player

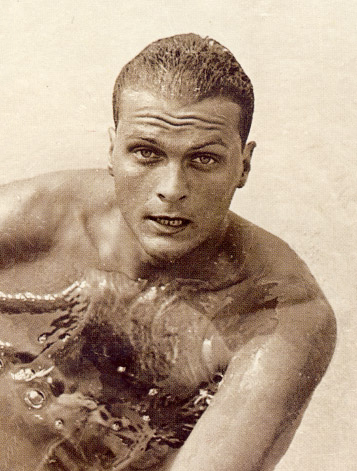
- Paolo Pucci in 1958

Personal information
- Full name: Paolo Pucci
- Born: 21 April 1935 (age 91) Rome, Italy

Sport
- Sport: Swimming, water polo
- Club: SS Lazio, Rome
Medal record
Representing Italy
Swimming
European Championships (LC)
Gold medal – first place	1958 Budapest	100 m freestyle
Silver medal – second place	1958 Budapest	4×200 m freestyle
Bronze medal – third place	1958 Budapest	4×100 m medley
Mediterranean Games
Gold medal – first place	1959 Beirut	100 m freestyle
Gold medal – first place	1959 Beirut	4×200 m freestyle
Gold medal – first place	1959 Beirut	4×100 m medley
Water polo
Mediterranean Games
Gold medal – first place	1955 Barcelona	Team

Paolo Pucci (born 21 April 1935) is a retired Italian freestyle swimmer and water polo player who competed in the 1956 Summer Olympics. He was eliminated in the semi-finals of the 100 m freestyle competition and finished fourth with the Italian water polo team.

Pucci won a gold medal at the 1958 European Aquatics Championships in the 100 m freestyle, becoming Italy's first swimming European champion.

== See also ==
- Italian record progression 100 metres freestyle
- Italian record progression 200 metres freestyle
