= Marcello Guarducci =

Italian swimmer (born 1956)

Personal information
- Full name: Marcello Guarducci
- Nationality: Italian
- Born: 11 July 1956 (age 70) Trento, Italy

Sport
- Sport: Swimming
- Strokes: freestyle
- Club: Carabinieri
Medal record
World Championships (LC)
Bronze medal – third place	Cali 1975	4×100 freestyle
European Championships (LC)
Silver medal – second place	Jönköping 1977	4×100 m freestyle
Bronze medal – third place	Jönköping 1977	100 m freestyle
Bronze medal – third place	Jönköping 1977	200 m freestyle
Bronze medal – third place	Rome 1983	4×200 m freestyle
Mediterranean Games
Gold medal – first place	Algiers 1975	100 m freestyle
Gold medal – first place	Algiers 1975	200 m freestyle
Gold medal – first place	Algiers 1975	4×100 m freestyle
Gold medal – first place	Algiers 1975	4×200 m freestyle
Gold medal – first place	Algiers 1975	4×100 m medley
Gold medal – first place	Split 1979	100 m freestyle
Gold medal – first place	Split 1979	4×200 m freestyle
Gold medal – first place	Casablanca 1983	100 m freestyle
Gold medal – first place	Casablanca 1983	4×200 m freestyle
Silver medal – second place	Split 1979	4×100 m medley
Bronze medal – third place	Split 1979	200 freestyle
Universiade
Gold medal – first place	1979 Mexico City	100 m freestyle

Marcello Guarducci (born 11 July 1956) is an Italian former freestyle swimmer.

== Biography ==
Guarducci won several gold medals in different editions of the Mediterranean Games. Guarducci participated in three Olympic Games editions reaching finals. Being part of a military athletic group, he missed the games of Moscow 1980 because of the boycott.

== See also ==
- Italian record progression 50 metres freestyle
- Italian record progression 100 metres freestyle
- Italian record progression 200 metres freestyle
- Italian record progression 400 metres freestyle
