= Romana Calligaris =

Italian swimmer (1924–2002)

Personal information
- Full name: Romana Calligaris
- Nationality: Italy
- Born: 15 December 1924 Mariano del Friuli, Italy
- Died: 21 April 2002 (aged 77) Trieste, Italy

Sport
- Sport: Swimming
- Strokes: freestyle

Romana Calligaris (15 December 1924 – 21 April 2002) was an Italian freestyle swimmer who won 15 national titles between 1947 and 1953. She competed at the 1952 Summer Olympics in the 100 m and 4 × 100 m relay events but failed to reach the finals. The pool which hosted the European SC Championships 2005 in Trieste is named after Bruno Bianchi, not Romana Calligaris.

== See also ==
- Italian record progression 100 metres freestyle
- Italian record progression 200 metres freestyle
- Italian record progression 400 metres freestyle
