= Alfonso Buonocore =

Italian water polo player (1933–2023)

Personal information
- Full name: Alfonso Buonocore
- Nationality: Italian
- Born: 11 March 1933 Naples, Italy
- Died: 12 May 2023 (aged 90)

Sport
- Sport: Swimming
- Strokes: Freestyle
Medal record
Mediterranean Games
Bronze medal – third place	1955 Barcelona	100 m freestyle

Alfonso Buonocore (11 March 1933 – 12 May 2023) was an Italian freestyle swimmer and water polo player who competed in the 1952 Summer Olympics and in the 1956 Summer Olympics.

In 1952, he was eliminated in the first round of the 100 metre freestyle competition.

Four years later, he was a member of the Italian water polo team, which finished fourth in the Olympic tournament. He played five matches.

Buonocore died on 12 May 2023, at the age of 90.

== See also ==
- Italian record progression 200 metres freestyle
