= Paolo Galletti =

Italian swimmer (1937–2015)

Personal information
- Full name: Paolo Galletti
- Nationality: Italy
- Born: 7 March 1937 Florence, Italy
- Died: 25 April 2015 (aged 78) Tavarnelle Val di Pesa, Italy
- Height: 1.76 m (5 ft 9 in)
- Weight: 64 kg (141 lb; 10.1 st)

Sport
- Sport: Swimming
- Strokes: freestyle
Medal record
European Championships
Silver medal – second place	1958 Budapest	4×200 m freestyle
Bronze medal – third place	1958 Budapest	400 m freestyle

Paolo Galletti (7 March 1937 – 25 April 2015) was an Italian swimmer. He participated in two Olympic Games, in 1956 and in 1960.

Left to right: Paolo Galletti, Carlo Pedersoli, Angelo Romani, Osvaldo Berti, Giorgio Grilz.

== See also ==
- Italian record progression 400 metres freestyle
