= Stefano Grandi =

Italian swimmer

Personal information
- Born: 11 November 1962 (age 63) Rome, Italy

Sport
- Sport: Swimming

Stefano Grandi (born 11 November 1962) is an Italian freestyle swimmer. He competed in two events at the 1984 Summer Olympics.
