= Alberto Castagnetti =

Italian swimmer and coach

Personal information
- Born: February 3, 1943
- Died: October 12, 2009 (aged 66)

Sport
- Sport: Swimming

Alberto Castagnetti (3 February 1943, in Verona – 12 October 2009) was an Italian swimming coach and freestyle swimmer.

As a swimmer, Castagnetti won several Italian titles swimming in relays. He swam at the 1972 Summer Olympics in Munich and at the 1973 World Aquatics Championships in Belgrade.

He coached the Italian national swimming team from 1987 until his death from the consequences of a heart operation in October 2009. Notable athletes he coached include Giorgio Lamberti, Domenico Fioravanti and Federica Pellegrini.

He has 4 daughters. They all love swimming and have taken after him
