= Daniela Beneck =

Italian swimmer (born 1946)

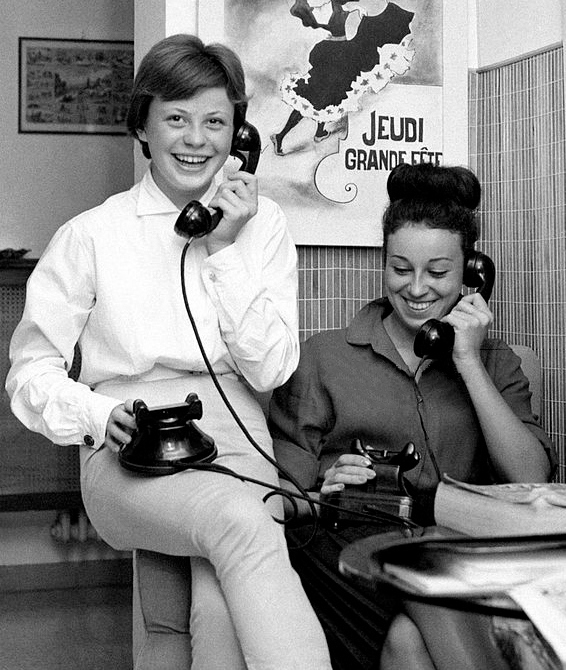
- Daniela (left) and Anna Beneck in 1960

Personal information
- Born: 8 July 1946 (age 79) Turin, Italy
- Height: 1.63 m (5 ft 4 in)
- Weight: 54 kg (119 lb)

Sport
- Sport: Swimming
- Club: SS Lazio

Daniela Beneck (born 8 July 1946) is an Italian retired freestyle swimmer. She competed at the 1960 and 1964 Olympics in the 100 m, 400 m and 4 × 100 m relay, but was eliminated in the preliminaries. During her career she set multiple national records in the 100 m, 200 m and 400 m events.

Beneck is married to Roberto Frinolli, who ran 400 m hurdles at the 1964 Olympics. Their son Giorgio Frinolli Puzzilli ran 400 m hurdles at the 2000 Olympics. Daniela's sister Anna also competed in swimming at the 1960 Olympics and married a 400 m Olympic hurdler. Their father Bruno Beneck was a journalist.
