= Emilio Polli =

Italian swimmer

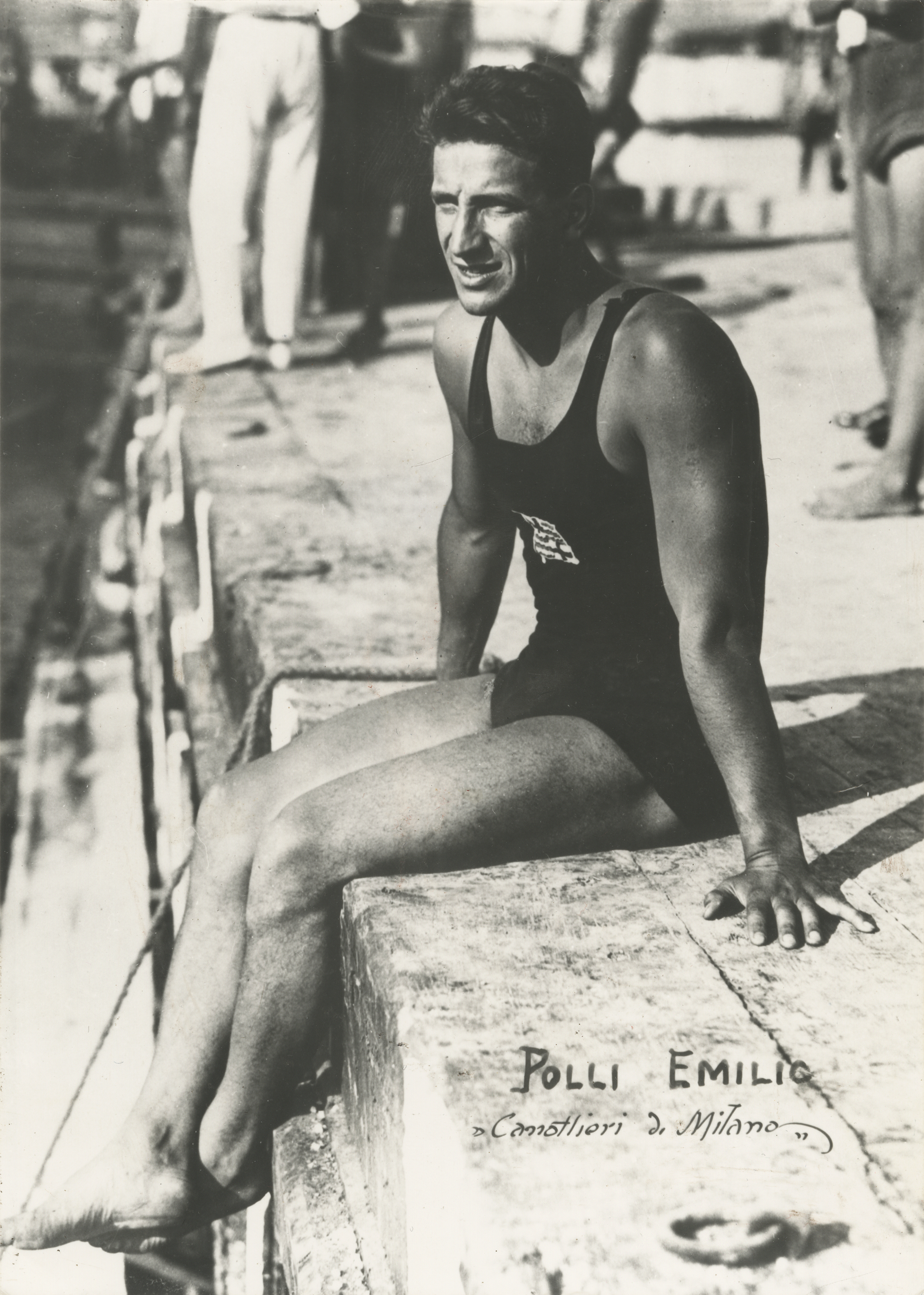
- Polli on the bank of the Navigli of Milan

Personal information
- Born: 10 April 1901
- Died: 30 January 1983 (aged 81)

Sport
- Sport: Swimming
- Strokes: freestyle
- Club: Società Canottieri Milano

Emilio Polli (10 April 1901 – 30 January 1983) was an Italian swimmer. He was in the Olympic swimming team at the 1924 and 1928 Summer Olympics, and in the national team at the first two European Championships, at Budapest in 1926 and at Bologna in 1927. He competed in 100 m freestyle and 4 × 200 m freestyle events.
