= Giuseppe Perentin =

Italian swimmer

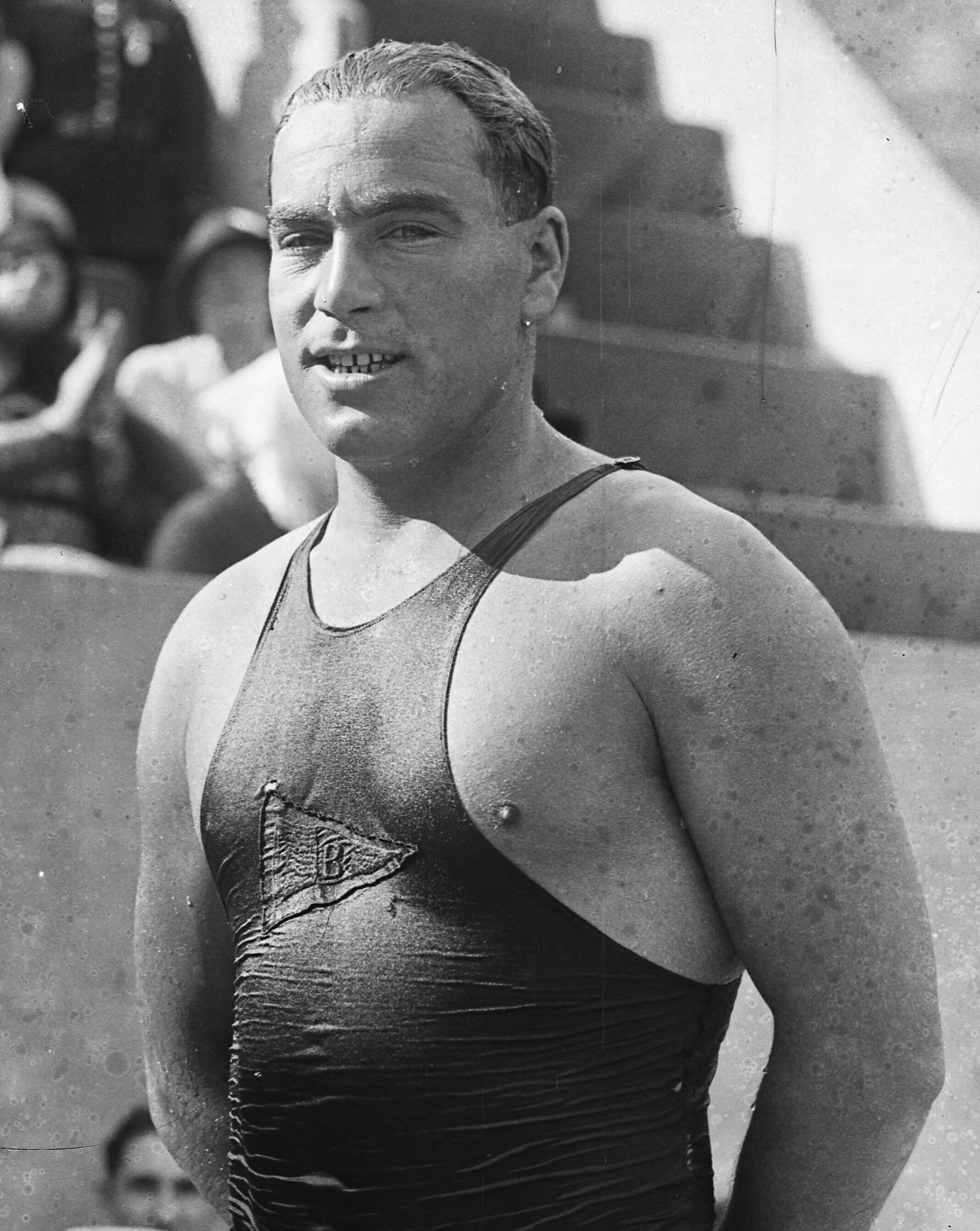
- Giuseppe Perentin in 1931

Personal information
- Born: 21 February 1906 Izola, Austria-Hungary
- Died: 4 March 1981 (aged 75) Trieste, Italy

Sport
- Sport: Swimming
Medal record
Representing Italy
European Championships
Silver medal – second place	1927 Bologna	1500 m freestyle
Silver medal – second place	1931 Paris	1500 m freestyle

Giuseppe Perentin (21 February 1906 – 4 March 1981) was an Italian freestyle swimmer who competed in the 1928 Summer Olympics and in the 1932 Summer Olympics.

Perentin was born in Izola, Austria-Hungary. In 1928 he was eliminated in the semi-finals of the 1500 metre freestyle event. He was also a member of the Italian relay team which was eliminated in the first round of the 4×200 metre freestyle relay competition.

Four years later he was eliminated in the semi-finals of the 400 metre freestyle event as well as in the first round of the 1500 metre freestyle competition.
