= Giorgio Lamberti =

Italian swimmer (born 1969)

Personal information
- National team: Italy
- Born: 28 January 1969 (age 57) Brescia, Lombardy
- Height: 1.83 m (6 ft 0 in)
- Spouse: Tanya Vannini

Sport
- Sport: Swimming
- Strokes: Freestyle
- Club: Leonessa Nuoto (former)
- Coach: Pietro Santi (former); Alberto Castagnetti (former)
Medal record
World Aquatics Championships
Gold medal – first place	1991 Perth	200 m freestyle
Bronze medal – third place	1991 Perth	100 m freestyle
Bronze medal – third place	1991 Perth	4×200 m freestyle
European Aquatics Championships (LC)
Gold medal – first place	1989 Bonn	100 m freestyle
Gold medal – first place	1989 Bonn	200 m freestyle
Gold medal – first place	1989 Bonn	4×200 m freestyle
Silver medal – second place	1987 Strasbourg	200 m freestyle
Silver medal – second place	1991 Athens	200 m freestyle
Silver medal – second place	1991 Athens	4×200 m freestyle
Bronze medal – third place	1989 Bonn	4×100 m medley
Bronze medal – third place	1991 Athens	100 m freestyle
Bronze medal – third place	1991 Athens	400 m freestyle
Mediterranean Games
Gold medal – first place	1987 Latakia	100 m freestyle
Gold medal – first place	1987 Latakia	200 m freestyle
Gold medal – first place	1987 Latakia	400 m freestyle
Gold medal – first place	1991 Athens	200 m freestyle
Bronze medal – third place	1991 Athens	50 m freestyle

Giorgio Lamberti (born 28 January 1969) is an Italian former swimmer. In 1991 he became the first swimmer of Italy to win a world title, and gold medal, at a FINA World Aquatics Championships. He formerly held world records in the short course and long course 200 metre freestyle as well as in the short course 400 metre freestyle.

== Biography ==
Lamberti was born in Brescia, Lombardy. At six, he was advised to begin swimming to improve his light physique. At 17, in 1986, he won the first of his six Italian championships. He took part in the following 1986 World Aquatics Championships, where he reached the B final in the 200 freestyle, and took part in the Italian 4x200 freestyle relay.

The following year, now coached by Alberto Castagnetti, he established the new short course record at Bonn in the 200 and 400 m freestyle. However, he did not qualify for the finals in the same races at the 1988 Summer Olympic Games later in the year. At the 1989 European LC Championships, held again in Bonn, winning the gold medal in the 100 and 200 m freestyle; in the latter, with 1'46"69, he set the new world record, which remained unbeaten for 10 years, until Grant Hackett improved it at Brisbane in 1999. Lamberti at Bonn won another gold medal in the 4x200 freestyle.

In the 1991 World Aquatics Championships in Perth, Lamberti won the gold medal in the 200 m freestyle, winning also a medal in the 100 m and 4x200 m races. His gold medal in the 200 metre freestyle at the 1991 World Championships made him the first Italian world champion, gold medalist, at a World Aquatics Championships in swimming. In the European Championships held in the same year at Athens, he won a silver medal in the 200 m, behind Artur Wojdat, and a bronze in the 100 (won by Alexander Popov) and 400 m (won by Yevgeny Sadovyi). Lamberti participated in the 1992 Summer Olympics, obtaining a fifth place in the 4x200 m relay as his best results.

== After swimming ==
He retired from professional swimming in 1993, and, from 2003 to 2008, was a member of the city's council of Brescia, with responsibility for sports and recreation. He later held several positions in the Italian Swimming Federation.

On 3 November 2000, he had a son, Michele Lamberti, who also became a competitive swimmer. His son was birthed by his wife, Tanya Vannini, who was also a competitive swimmer. In addition to Michele, his other children are Noemi and Matteo.

== Recognition ==
- In 2004 he was inducted into the International Swimming Hall of Fame.
- Italian swim club Team Veneto designed their swim cap and logo to depict Giorgio Lamberti in honour of his accomplishments for Italian swimming on the global level.

== See also ==
- List of members of the International Swimming Hall of Fame
- Italy national swimming team - Multiple medalists
- Italian record progression 100 metres freestyle
- Italian record progression 200 metres freestyle
- World record progression 200 metres freestyle
- World record progression 400 metres freestyle

Awards
Preceded by Alberto Tomba	Italian Sportsman of the Year; 1989	Succeeded by Gianni Bugno
Preceded by Tamás Darnyi	European Swimmer of the Year; 1989	Succeeded by Adrian Moorhouse
