= Antonio Rastrelli (swimmer) =

Italian swimmer (born 1945)

Personal information
- Born: 15 January 1945 (age 81) Naples, Italy
- Height: 1.70 m (5 ft 7 in)
- Weight: 73 kg (161 lb)

Sport
- Sport: Swimming
- Club: Rari Nantes Napoli

Antonio Rastrelli (born 15 January 1945) is an Italian retired swimmer. He competed at the 1964 Summer Olympics in the 200 m butterfly, but failed to reach the final. He finished in sixth place in this event at the 1962 European Championships.
