= Lorenzo Vismara =

Italian swimmer (born 1975)

Personal information
- Full name: Lorenzo Vismara
- Nationality: Italy
- Born: 10 August 1975 (age 51) Saronno, Varese, Italy

Sport
- Sport: Swimming
- Strokes: Freestyle
Medal record
Men's swimming
Representing Italy
World Championships (LC)
Silver medal – second place	2007 Melbourne	4×100 m freestyle
European Championships (LC)
Gold medal – first place	2004 Madrid	4×100 m freestyle
Gold medal – first place	2006 Budapest	4×100 m freestyle
Silver medal – second place	1999 Istanbul	50 m freestyle
Silver medal – second place	2002 Berlin	50 m freestyle
Bronze medal – third place	2000 Helsinki	50 m freestyle
Bronze medal – third place	2002 Berlin	4×100 m freestyle
Bronze medal – third place	2004 Madrid	50 m freestyle
European Championships (SC)
Gold medal – first place	2002 Riesa	100 m freestyle
Silver medal – second place	2002 Riesa	50 m freestyle
Silver medal – second place	2002 Riesa 2002	4×50 m freestyle
Bronze medal – third place	1999 Lisbon	50 m freestyle
Mediterranean Games
Gold medal – first place	1997 Bari	4×100 m freestyle

Lorenzo Vismara (born 10 August 1975 in Saronno, Varese) is an Italian freestyle sprinter. He achieved many European-level medals in 50 m freestyle, 100 m freestyle and 4 × 100 m freestyle relay events. He participated for Italy in the Summer Olympics of Sydney 2000 and Athens 2004.

He has been the unchallenged Italian champion in sprint freestyle events for nearly ten years, succeeding René Gusperti.
