= Maria Cristina Pacifici =

Italian swimmer (born 1945)

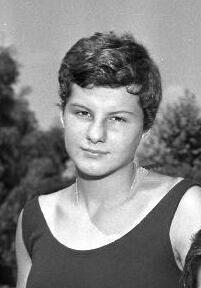
- Pacifici in 1960

Personal information
- Born: 5 August 1945 (age 80) Rome, Italy
- Height: 167 cm (5 ft 6 in)
- Weight: 62 kg (137 lb)

Sport
- Sport: Swimming
- Strokes: Freestyle
- Club: SS Lazio, Rome

Maria Cristina Pacifici (born 5 August 1945) is a retired Italian freestyle swimmer. She was part of the 4 × 100 m relay team that finished seventh-eighth at the 1960 and 1964 Summer Olympics. In 1960 she also competed in the individual 100 m event, but failed to reach the final.
