= Monica Vallarin =

Italian swimmer

Personal information
- Born: 1 February 1965 (age 61)

Sport
- Sport: Swimming

Monica Vallarin (born 1 February 1965) is an Italian swimmer. She competed in two events at the 1980 Summer Olympics.
