= Angelo Romani =

Italian swimmer (1934–2003)

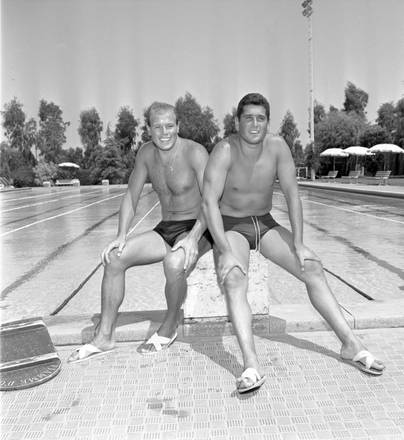
- Angelo Romani and Fritz Dennerlein 1960

Personal information
- Full name: Angelo Romani
- Nationality: Italy
- Born: 12 April 1934 Pesaro, Italy
- Died: 8 January 2003 (aged 68) Milan, Italy
- Height: 1.80 m (5 ft 11 in)
- Weight: 78 kg (172 lb; 12.3 st)

Sport
- Sport: Swimming
- Strokes: freestyle
Medal record
European Championships (LC)
Silver medal – second place	1954 Turin	400 m freestyle
Silver medal – second place	1958 Budapest	4×200 m freestyle
Mediterranean Games
Silver medal – second place	1955 Barcelona	400 m freestyle
Bronze medal – third place	1951 Alexandria	100 m backstroke

Angelo Romani (12 April 1934 – 8 January 2003) was an Italian swimmer. He participated in three Olympic Games. He was the Italian record holder several times in different events. He was born in Pesaro, Italy and died in Milan, Italy.

== Image gallery ==
Romani (left) with the Olympic swimmer Carlo Pedersoli (aka Bud Spencer)

Left to right: Paolo Galletti, Carlo Pedersoli, Angelo Romani, Osvaldo Berti, Giorgio Grilz

== See also ==
- Italian record progression 100 metres freestyle
- Italian record progression 200 metres freestyle
