= Manuela Melchiorri =

Italian swimmer (born in 1970)

Medal record

Women's swimming

Representing Italy

European Championships
Bronze medal – third place	1989 Bonn	400 m freestyle
Bronze medal – third place	1989 Bonn	4×200 m freestyle

Manuela Melchiorri (born 11 April 1970 in Rome) is a retired Italian freestyle swimmer who won two bronze medals at the 1989 European Aquatics Championships. She also competed at the 1988 and 1992 Summer Olympics in the 400 m and 800 m freestyle events but did not reach the finals. Between 1986 and 1992 she won 22 national titles in the 200–800 m freestyle and 200 m butterfly events.
