= Paolo Revelli =

Italian swimmer (born 1959)

Personal information
- Born: April 12, 1959 (age 67)

Sport
- Sport: Swimming
Medal record
Representing Italy
European Championships
Silver medal – second place	1977 Jönköping	4x100m freestyle relay
Bronze medal – third place	1983 Rome	200m butterfly
Bronze medal – third place	1983 Rome	4x200m freestyle relay
Mediterranean Games
Gold medal – first place	1975 Algiers	4x100m freestyle relay
Gold medal – first place	1975 Algiers	4x200m freestyle relay
Gold medal – first place	1979 Split	4x200m freestyle relay
Gold medal – first place	1979 Split	4x100m medley relay
Bronze medal – third place	1979 Split	400m freestyle

Paolo Revelli (born 12 April 1959) is an Italian former swimmer who competed in the 1976 Summer Olympics, in the 1980 Summer Olympics, and in the 1984 Summer Olympics.
