= Roberta Felotti =

Italian swimmer (born 1964)

Personal information
- Born: October 22, 1964 (age 61) Milan, Italy

Sport
- Sport: Swimming
Medal record
Representing Italy
Mediterranean Games
| Gold medal – first place | 1979 Split | 400m freestyle |
| Gold medal – first place | 1979 Split | 800m freestyle |
| Gold medal – first place | 1979 Split | 4x100m freestyle relay |
| Gold medal – first place | 1979 Split | 4x100m medley relay |
| Gold medal – first place | 1983 Casablanca | 400m individual medley |
| Gold medal – first place | 1987 Latakia | 200m individual medley |
| Gold medal – first place | 1987 Latakia | 400m individual medley |
| Silver medal – second place | 1979 Split | 200m freestyle |

Roberta Felotti (born 22 October 1964) is an Italian former freestyle and medley swimmer who competed in the 1980 Summer Olympics, in the 1984 Summer Olympics, and in the 1988 Summer Olympics.

Awards
| Preceded by Sara Simeoni | Italian Sportswoman of the Year; 1979 | Succeeded by Sara Simeoni |
