= Giovanni Paliaga =

Italian swimmer (1931–2019)

Personal information
- Born: 11 February 1931 Trieste, Italy
- Died: 29 December 2019 (aged 88) Trieste, Italy

Sport
- Sport: Swimming

Giovanni Paliaga (11 February 1931 – 29 December 2019) was an Italian swimmer. He competed in the men's 4 × 200 metre freestyle relay at the 1952 Summer Olympics.
