= Bruno Bianchi (swimmer) =

Italian swimmer (1943–1966)

Personal information
- Born: 26 September 1943 Trieste, Italy
- Died: 28 January 1966 (aged 22) Bremen, Germany

Sport
- Sport: Swimming
Medal record
Representing Italy
Summer Universiade
Bronze medal – third place	1963 Porto Alegre	4x100m freestyle relay
Mediterranean Games
Gold medal – first place	1959 Beirut	4x200m freestyle relay

Bruno Bianchi (Italian pronunciation: [ˈbruːno ˈbjaŋki]; 26 September 1943 – 28 January 1966) was an Italian swimmer who competed in the 1960 Summer Olympics and in the 1964 Summer Olympics.

He died in the Lufthansa Flight 005 crash in Bremen, Germany.

In Trieste, the aquatic centre was named after him, called Polo Natatorio Bruno Bianchi.
