= Arnaldo Cinquetti =

Italian swimmer (born 1953)

Personal information
- Born: November 7, 1953 (age 72)

Sport
- Sport: Swimming
Medal record
Representing Italy
Mediterranean Games
| Gold medal – first place | 1971 Izmir | 200m freestyle |
| Gold medal – first place | 1971 Izmir | 4x200m freestyle relay |
| Silver medal – second place | 1971 Izmir | 4x100m freestyle |

Arnaldo Cinquetti (born 7 November 1953) is an Italian former swimmer who competed in the 1972 Summer Olympics.
