= Carla Lasi =

Italian swimmer

Personal information
- Born: 25 July 1965 (age 60) Riolo Terme, Italy

Sport
- Sport: Swimming
Medal record
Representing Italy
Summer Universiade
Silver medal – second place	1985 Kobe	800m freestyle
Mediterranean Games
Gold medal – first place	1983 Casablanca	800m freestyle
Silver medal – second place	1983 Casablanca	400m freestyle

Carla Lasi (born 25 July 1965) is an Italian former freestyle swimmer. She competed in three events at the 1984 Summer Olympics.
