= Paolo Costoli =

Italian swimmer (1910–1966)

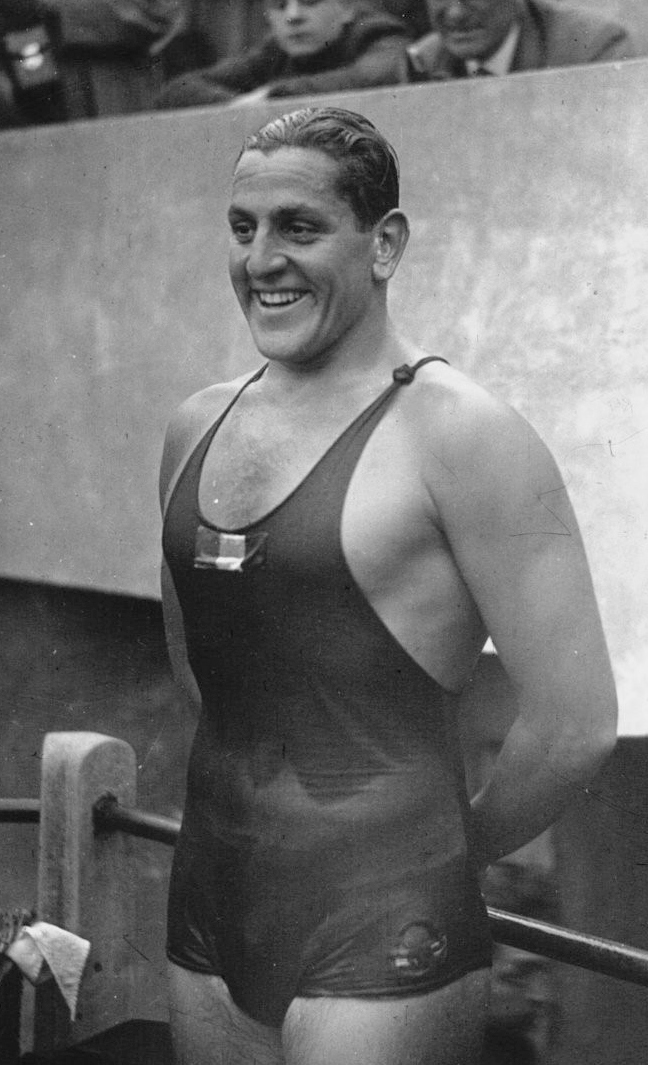
- Paolo Costoli at the 1931 European Championships

Personal information
- Born: 12 August 1910 Florence, Italy
- Died: 28 January 1966 (aged 55) Bremen, Germany

Sport
- Sport: Swimming
Medal record
Representing Italy
European Championships
Bronze medal – third place	1931 Paris	400 m freestyle
Bronze medal – third place	1931 Paris	1500 m freestyle
Bronze medal – third place	1931 Paris	4×200 m freestyle
Silver medal – second place	1934 Magdeburg	400 m freestyle
Silver medal – second place	1934 Magdeburg	1500 m freestyle
Bronze medal – third place	1934 Magdeburg	4×200 m freestyle

Paolo Costoli (12 August 1910 – 28 January 1966) was an Italian freestyle swimmer who won six medals at the European championships in 1931 and 1934. He competed at the 1928 and 1932 Summer Olympics in four events in total, ranging from 200 to 1500 m, but failed to reach the finals.

He died in an aircraft crash in Bremen, Germany.
