= Sergio De Gregorio (swimmer) =

Italian swimmer

Personal information
- Born: 24 February 1946 Rome, Italy
- Died: 28 January 1966 (aged 19) Bremen, Germany

Sport
- Sport: Swimming

Sergio De Gregorio (24 February 1946 – 28 January 1966) was an Italian freestyle swimmer. He competed in three events at the 1964 Summer Olympics. He died in the Lufthansa Flight 005 plane crash in Bremen, Germany.
