= Giovanni Orlando =

Italian swimmer

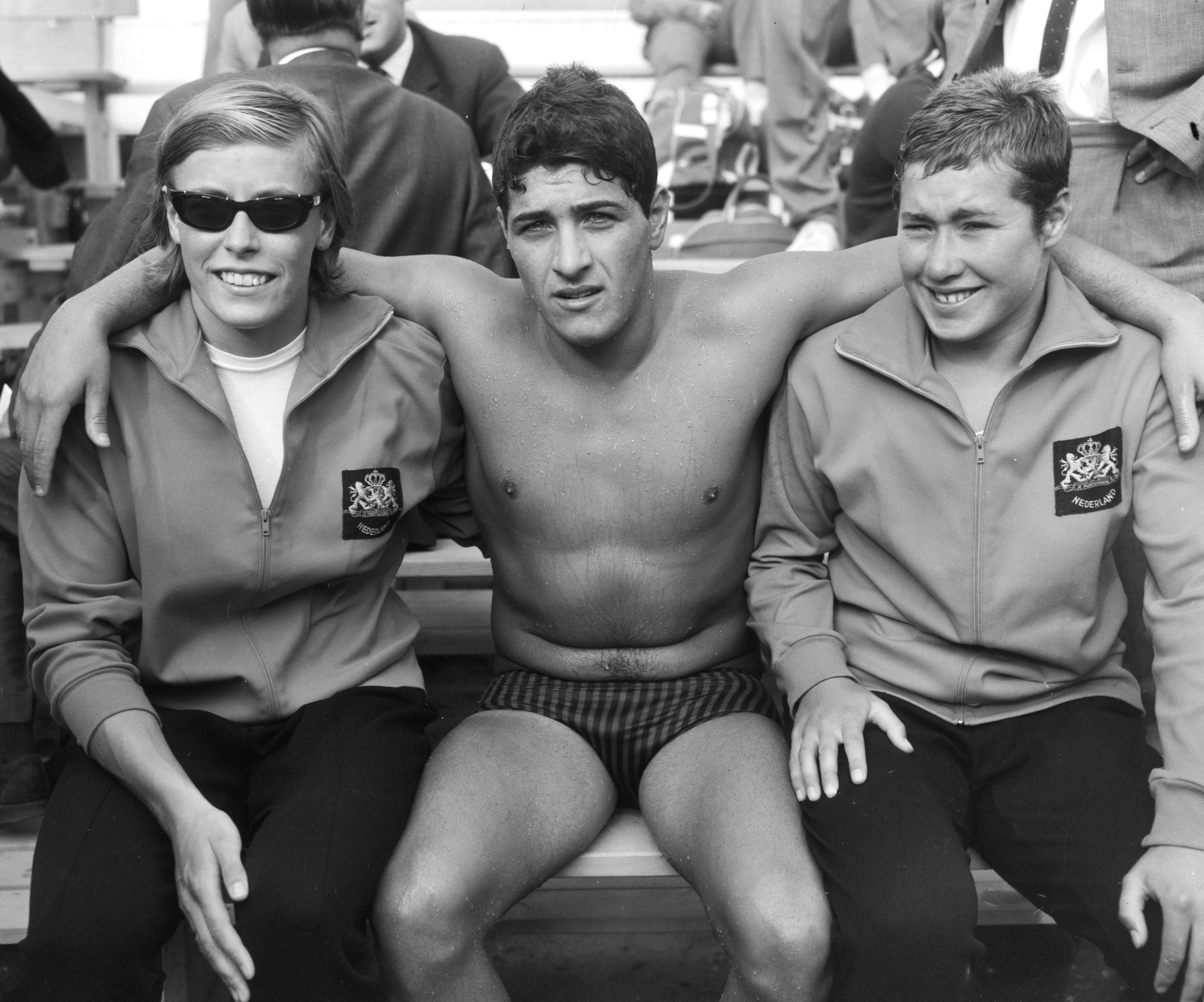
- Gretta Kok, Giovanni Orlando and Adrie Lasterie in 1964

Personal information
- Born: 2 February 1945 (age 81) Naples, Italy
- Height: 1.68 m (5 ft 6 in)
- Weight: 71 kg (157 lb)

Sport
- Sport: Swimming
- Club: Circolo Canottieri
Medal record
Representing Italy
Summer Universiade
Bronze medal – third place	1963 Porto Alegre	4x100m freestyle relay

Giovanni Orlando (born 2 February 1945) is an Italian retired freestyle swimmer who competed at the 1964 Olympics. He was part of the Italian 4 × 200 m relay team that finished eighth, and was eliminated in the heats of the 200 m individual freestyle race.
