= Paola Saini =

Italian swimmer (born 1945)

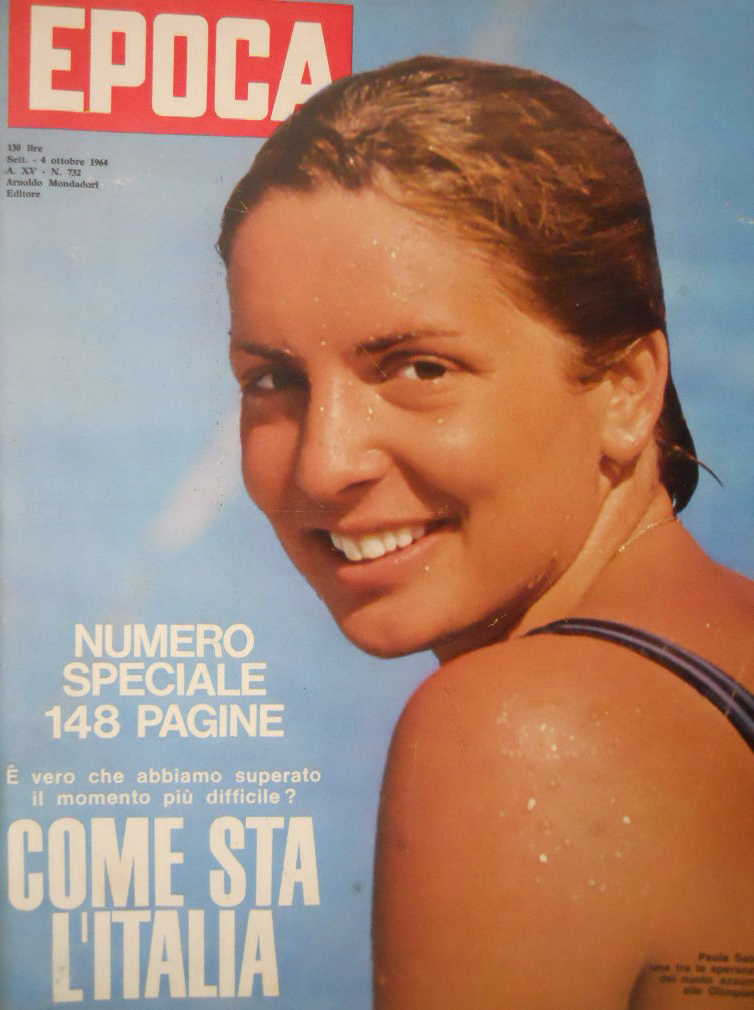
- Paola Saini on the cover of Epoca in 1964

Personal information
- Born: 11 October 1945 (age 80) Orta San Giulio, Italy
- Height: 1.62 m (5 ft 4 in)
- Weight: 53 kg (117 lb)

Sport
- Sport: Swimming
- Club: SS Lazio, Rome

Paola Saini (born 11 October 1945) is a retired Italian swimmer. She competed in various events at the 1960 and 1964 Summer Olympics and reached the final of the 4 × 100 m freestyle relay on both occasions. After retiring from competitions in 1966 she graduated in biology, and later taught in Italy, Turkey and Spain.
