= Italian Swimming Federation =

Governing organization for aquatic sports

Federazione Italiana Nuoto
LEN
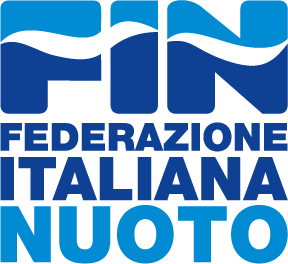
- Founded: 1899
- FINA affiliation: 1909
- Website: federnuoto.it
- President: Sen. Paolo Barelli

The Italian Swimming Federation (Italian: Federazione Italiana Nuoto) (FIN), founded in 1899 is the governing, organizing, and controlling body of swimming and all other aquatic sports in Italy. The organization is affiliated with the Italian National Olympic Committee and defines competitive regulations for swimming disciplines. It brings together more than 1200 clubs.

== Disciplines ==
- Swimming
- Water polo
- Diving
- Synchronized swimming
- Long-distance swimming
- Lifesaving swimming

== See also ==
- Italy national swimming team
- Italy at the World Aquatics Championships
- Swimming Summer Olympics medal table
