= Italy at the 1928 Summer Olympics =

- IOC code: ITA
- NOC: Italian National Olympic Committee

in Amsterdam
- Competitors: 174 (156 men, 18 women) in 15 sports
- Flag bearer: Carlo Galimberti
- Medals Ranked 5th: Gold 7 Silver 5 Bronze 7 Total 19

Summer Olympics appearances (overview)
- 1896; 1900; 1904; 1908; 1912; 1920; 1924; 1928; 1932; 1936; 1948; 1952; 1956; 1960; 1964; 1968; 1972; 1976; 1980; 1984; 1988; 1992; 1996; 2000; 2004; 2008; 2012; 2016; 2020; 2024

Other related appearances
- 1906 Intercalated Games

Italy competed at the 1928 Summer Olympics in Amsterdam, Netherlands. 174 competitors, 156 men and 18 women, took part in 81 events in 15 sports.

== Medalists ==
Medal	Name	Sport	Event	Date
Gold	Vittorio Tamagnini	Boxing	Men's bantamweight	August 11
Gold	Carlo Orlandi	Boxing	Men's lightweight	August 11
Gold	Piero Toscani	Boxing	Men's middleweight	August 11
Gold	Giacomo Gaioni, Cesare Facciani, Mario Lusiani, Luigi Tasselli	Cycling	Men's team pursuit	August 6
Gold	Carlo Agostoni, Giulio Basletta, Marcello Bertinetti, Giancarlo Cornaggia-Medici, Renzo Minoli, Franco Riccardi	Fencing	Men's team épée	August 5
Gold	Giorgio Chiavacci, Giulio Gaudini, Gioacchino Guaragna, Giorgio Pessina, Ugo Pignotti, Oreste Puliti	Fencing	Men's team foil	July 30
Gold	Giliante D'Este, Giovanni Delise, Valerio Perentin, Giorgio Pessina, Renato Petronio, Nicolò Vittori	Rowing	Men's coxed four	August 10
Silver	Renato Anselmi, Bino Bini, Gustavo Marzi, Oreste Puliti, Emilio Salafia, Giulio Sarrocchi	Fencing	Men's team sabre	August 9
Silver	Romeo Neri	Gymnastics	Men's horizontal bar	August 9
Silver	Bianca Ambrosetti, Lavinia Gianoni, Luigina Giavotti, Virginia Giorgi, Germana Malabarba, Carla Marangoni, Luigina Perversi, Diana Pissavini, Anna Tanzini, Carolina Tronconi, Ines Vercesi, Rita Vittadini	Gymnastics	Women's team all-around	August 9
Silver	Pierino Gabetti	Weightlifting	Men's 60 kg	July 30
Silver	Carlo Galimberti	Weightlifting	Men's 75 kg	July 29
Bronze	Carlo Cavagnoli	Boxing	Men's flyweight	August 11
Bronze	Giulio Gaudini	Fencing	Men's foil	August 1
Bronze	Bino Bini	Fencing	Men's sabre	August 11
Bronze	Italy national football team: Adolfo Baloncieri; Elvio Banchero; Delfo Bellini; Fulvio Bernardini; Umberto Caligaris; Gianpiero Combi; Giovanni De Prà; Valentino Degani; Attilio Ferraris; Felice Gasperi; Pietro Genovesi; Antonio Janni; Virgilio Levratto; Mario Magnozzi; Pietro Pastore; Silvio Pietroboni; Alfredo Pitto; Enrico Rivolta; Virginio Rosetta; Gino Rossetti; Angelo Schiavio; Andrea Viviano	Football		June 9
Bronze	Umberto Bonadè, Pietro Freschi, Paolo Gennari, Cesare Rossi	Rowing	Men's coxless four	August 10
Bronze	Giovanni Gozzi	Wrestling	Men's Greco-Roman bantamweight	August 4
Bronze	Gerolamo Quaglia	Wrestling	Men's Greco-Roman featherweight	August 5

== Athletics ==
=== Results ===
Men (18)
Athlete	Age	Event	Rank
Luigi Beccali	20	Men's 1,500 metres	4 h1 r1/2
Edgardo Toetti	17	Men's 100 metres	3 h6 r1/4
Franco Reyser	24	Men's 100 metres	4 h2 r1/4
Giacomo Carlini	23	Men's 110 metres Hurdles	3 h7 r1/3
Giuseppe Castelli	20	Men's 200 metres	5 h6 r2/4
Edgardo Toetti	17	Men's 200 metres	3 h15r1/4
Nello Bartolini	23	Men's 3,000 metres Steeplechase	6 h1 r1/2
Giuseppe Castelli	20	Men's 4 × 100 metres Relay	3 h1 r1/2
Franco Reyser	24	Men's 4 × 100 metres Relay	3 h1 r1/2
Edgardo Toetti	17	Men's 4 × 100 metres Relay	3 h1 r1/2
Enrico Torre	26	Men's 4 × 100 metres Relay	3 h1 r1/2
Giacomo Carlini	23	Men's 4 × 400 metres Relay	3 h2 r1/2
Luigi Facelli	30	Men's 4 × 400 metres Relay	3 h2 r1/2
Guido Cominotto	26	Men's 4 × 400 metres Relay	3 h2 r1/2
Ettore Tavernari	23	Men's 4 × 400 metres Relay	3 h2 r1/2
Luigi Facelli	30	Men's 400 metres Hurdles	6
Guido Cominotto	26	Men's 800 metres	6 h2 r2/3
Ettore Tavernari	23	Men's 800 metres	4 h4 r1/3
Albino Pighi	25	Men's Discus Throw	19 QR
Camillo Zemi	30	Men's Discus Throw	23 QR
Armando Poggioli	39	Men's Hammer Throw	4
Camillo Zemi	30	Men's Hammer Throw	13 QR
Virgilio Tommasi	23	Men's Long Jump	25T QR
Enrico Torre	26	Men's Long Jump	25T QR
Giuseppe Ferrera		Men's Marathon	34
Romeo Bertini	35	Men's Marathon	AC
Attilio Conton	25	Men's Marathon	AC
Stefano Natale	25	Men's Marathon	AC
Women (6)
Athlete	Age	Event	Rank
Derna Polazzo	16	Women's 100 metres	3 h1 r1/3
Luigia Bonfanti		Women's 100 metres	3 h5 r1/3
Matilde Moraschi	18	Women's 100 metres	4 h3 r1/3
Luigia Bonfanti		Women's 4 × 100 metres Relay	6
Giannina Marchini	22	Women's 4 × 100 metres Relay	6
Derna Polazzo	16	Women's 4 × 100 metres Relay	6
Vittorina Vivenza	15	Women's 4 × 100 metres Relay	6
Giannina Marchini	22	Women's 800 metres	9 h2 r1/2
Piera Borsani	18	Women's Discus Throw	13

== Boxing ==
Men's Flyweight (– 50.8 kg)

- Carlo Covagnioli → Bronze Medal

- First Round — Bye
- Second Round — Defeated Robert Sartos (BEL), points
- Quarterfinals — Defeated Alfredo Gaona (MEX), points
- Semifinals — Lost to Antal Kocsis (HUN), points
- Third Place Match — Defeated Baddie Lebanon (RSA), points

Men's Light Heavyweight (– 79.4 kg)

- Domenico Ceccerelli

- First Round — Lost to Donald McCorkindale (RSA), points

== Cycling ==
12 cyclists, all men, represented Italy in 1928.

Individual road race

- Allegro Grandi
- Michele Orecchia
- Ambrogio Beretta
- Marcello Neri

Team road race

- Allegro Grandi
- Michele Orecchia
- Ambrogio Beretta
- Marcello Neri

Sprint

- Edoardo Severgnini

Time trial

- Angelo Cattaneo

Tandem

- Francesco Malatesta
- Adolfo Corsi

Team pursuit

- Luigi Tasselli
- Giacomo Gaioni
- Cesare Facciani
- Mario Lusiani

== Fencing ==
18 fencers, all men, represented Italy in 1928.

Men's foil

- Giulio Gaudini
- Oreste Puliti
- Ugo Pignotti

Men's team foil

- Ugo Pignotti, Giulio Gaudini, Giorgio Pessina, Gioacchino Guaragna, Oreste Puliti, Giorgio Chiavacci

Men's team épée

- Giulio Basletta, Marcello Bertinetti, Giancarlo Cornaggia-Medici, Carlo Agostoni, Renzo Minoli, Franco Riccardi

Men's sabre

- Bino Bini
- Gustavo Marzi
- Arturo De Vecchi

Men's team sabre

- Bino Bini, Oreste Puliti, Giulio Sarrocchi, Renato Anselmi, Emilio Salafia, Gustavo Marzi

== Football ==
Round of 16

29 May 1928
14:00

France	3–4	Italy
Brouzes 15', 17'; Dauphin 61'	Report	Rossetti 19'; Levratto 39'; Banchero 43'; Baloncieri 60'

Olympic Stadium, Amsterdam
Attendance: 2,509
Referee: Henri Christophe (Belgium)

Quarter-finals

1 June 1928
19:00

Italy	1–1 (a.e.t.)	Spain
Baloncieri 63'	Report	Zaldúa 11'

Olympic Stadium, Amsterdam
Attendance: 3,388
Referee: Domingo Lombardi (Uruguay)
4 June 1928
14:00
Replay

Italy	7–1	Spain
Magnozzi 14'; Schiavio 15'; Baloncieri 18'; Bernardini 40'; Rivolta 72'; Levratto 76', 77'	Report	Yermo 47'

Olympic Stadium, Amsterdam
Attendance: 4,770
Referee: Hans Boekman (Netherlands)

Semi-finals

7 June 1928
19:00

Italy	2–3	Uruguay
Baloncieri 9'; Levratto 60'	Report	Cea 17'; Campolo 28'; Scarone 31'

Olympic Stadium, Amsterdam
Attendance: 15,230
Referee: Willem Eijmers (Netherlands)

Bronze medal match

9 June 1928
16:00

Italy	11–3	Egypt
Schiavio 6', 42', 58'; Baloncieri 14', 52'; Banchero 19', 39', 44'; Magnozzi 72', 80', 88'	Report	Riad 12', 16'; El Ezam 60'

Olympic Stadium, Amsterdam
Attendance: 6,378
Referee: John Langenus (Belgium)

== Modern pentathlon ==
Three male pentathletes represented Italy in 1928.

- Eugenio Pagnini
- Luigi Petrillo
- Carlo Simonetti

== Swimming ==
Men

Athlete	Event	Heat		Semifinal		Final	
Athlete	Event	Time	Rank	Time	Rank	Time	Rank
Antonio Conelli	100 m freestyle	1:07.0		Unknown		Did not advance	
Emilio Polli	100 m freestyle	1:04.0		Unknown		Did not advance	
Paolo Costoli	400 m freestyle	Unknown		Did not advance			
Giovanni Gambi	1500 m freestyle	Unknown		Did not advance			
Giuseppe Perentin	1500 m freestyle	21:42.4		Unknown		Did not advance	
Emilio Polli; Giuseppe Perentin; Antonio Conelli; Paolo Costoli	1500 m freestyle	—N/a		10:03.2		Did not advance	
