= Germany at the 1928 Summer Olympics =

- IOC code: GER
- NOC: German Olympic Committee

in Amsterdam, Netherlands 28 July–12 August 1928
- Competitors: 295 (260 men, 35 women) in 16 sports
- Flag bearer: Ernst Paulus
- Medals Ranked 2nd: Gold 10 Silver 7 Bronze 14 Total 31

Summer Olympics appearances (overview)
- 1896; 1900; 1904; 1908; 1912; 1920–1924; 1928; 1932; 1936; 1948; 1952; 1956–1988; 1992; 1996; 2000; 2004; 2008; 2012; 2016; 2020; 2024

Other related appearances
- 1906 Intercalated Games –––– Saar (1952); United Team of Germany (1956–1964); East Germany (1968–1988); West Germany (1968–1988)

Germany competed at the 1928 Summer Olympics in Amsterdam, Netherlands. Germany returned to the Olympic Games after not being invited to both the 1920 and 1924 Games due to its role in World War I. Despite a total absence of 16 years since 1912, German athletes were ranked 2nd. 295 competitors, 260 men and 35 women, took part in 95 events in 16 sports.

== Medalists ==
Medal	Name	Sport	Event	Date
Gold	Lina Radke	Athletics	Women's 800 m	August 2
Gold	Carl Freiherr von Langen	Equestrian	Individual dressage	August 11
Gold	Hermann Linkenbach, Carl Freiherr von Langen, Eugen Freiherr von Lotzbeck	Equestrian	Team dressage	August 11
Gold	Helene Mayer	Fencing	Women's foil	August 1
Gold	Kurt Moeschter, Bruno Müller	Rowing	Men's coxless pair	August 10
Gold	Hilde Schrader	Swimming	Women's 200 m breaststroke	August 9
Gold	Germany men's national water polo team: Max Amann; Karl Bähre; Emil Benecke; Johann Blank; Otto Cordes; Fritz Gunst; Erich Rademacher; Joachim Rademacher	Water polo		August 11
Gold	Kurt Helbig	Weightlifting	Men's 67.5 kg	July 28
Gold	Josef Straßberger	Weightlifting	Men's +82.5 kg	July 29
Gold	Kurt Leucht	Wrestling	Men's Greco-Roman bantamweight	August 4
Silver	Richard Corts, Hubert Houben, Helmut Körnig, Georg Lammers	Athletics	Men's 4 × 100 m relay	August 5
Silver	Hermann Engelhard, Richard Krebs, Otto Neumann, Harry Werner Storz	Athletics	Men's 4 × 400 m relay	August 5
Silver	Ernst Pistulla	Boxing	Men's light heavyweight	August 11
Silver	Erwin Casmir	Fencing	Men's foil	August 11
Silver	Erich Rademacher	Swimming	Men's 200 m breaststroke	August 8
Silver	Eduard Sperling	Wrestling	Men's Greco-Roman lightweight	August 5
Silver	Adolf Rieger	Wrestling	Men's Greco-Roman light heavyweight	August 5
Bronze	Georg Lammers	Athletics	Men's 100 m	July 30
Bronze	Helmut Körnig	Athletics	Men's 200 m	August 1
Bronze	Joachim Büchner	Athletics	Men's 400 m	August 3
Bronze	Hermann Engelhard	Athletics	Men's 800 m	July 31
Bronze	Emil Hirschfeld	Athletics	Men's shot put	July 29
Bronze	Anni Holdmann, Leni Junker, Rosa Kellner, Leni Schmidt	Athletics	Women's 4 × 100 m relay	August 5
Bronze	Hans Bernhardt, Karl Köther	Cycling	Men's tandem	August 6
Bronze	Bruno Neumann	Equestrian	Individual eventing	August 11
Bronze	Olga Oelkers	Fencing	Women's foil	August 1
Bronze	Germany national field hockey team: Bruno Boche; Georg Brunner; Heinz Förstendorf; Erwin Franzkowiak; Werner Freyberg; Theodor Haag; Hans Haußmann; Kurt Haverbeck; Aribert Heymann; Herbert Hobein; Fritz Horn; Karl-Heinz Irmer; Herbert Kemmer; Fritz Lincke; Herbert Müller; Werner Proft; Heinz Schäfer; Gerd Strantzen; Kurt Weiß; Rolf Wollner; Heinz Wöltje; Erich Zander	Field hockey		May 26
Bronze	Helmuth Kahl	Modern pentathlon		August 4
Bronze	Charlotte Mühe	Swimming	Women's 200 m breaststroke	August 9
Bronze	Hans Wölpert	Weightlifting	Men's 60 kg	July 28
Bronze	Georg Gehring	Wrestling	Men's Greco-Roman heavyweight	August 5

== Athletics ==
Women's 100 metres

- Erna Steinberg – 4th
- Leni Schmidt – DQ (final)
- Anni Holdmann – Semi-final (4th in heat 1)
- Leni Junker – Semi-final (5th in heat 2)

== Boxing ==
Men's Flyweight (– 50.8 kg)

- Hubert Ausbock

- First Round — Bye
- Second Round — Defeated Lennart Bohman (SWE), points
- Quarterfinals — Lost to Antal Kocsis (HUN), points

Men's Heavyweight (+ 79.4 kg)

- Hans Schonrath

- First Round — Bye
- Quarterfinals — Lost to Nils Ramm (SWE), points

== Cycling ==
Ten cyclists, all men, represented Germany in 1928.

Individual road race

- Karl Koch
- Arthur Essing
- Bernhard Stübecke
- Otto Kürschner

Sprint

- Hans Bernhardt

Time trial

- Kurt Einsiedel

Tandem

- Karl Köther
- Hans Bernhardt

Team pursuit

- Josef Steger
- Anton Joksch
- Kurt Einsiedel
- Hans Dormbach

== Fencing ==
13 fencers, 10 men and 3 women, represented Germany in 1928.

Men's foil

- Erwin Casmir
- Fritz Gazzera
- Julius Thomson

Men's team foil

- Erwin Casmir, Fritz Gazzera, Julius Thomson, Wilhelm Löffler, August Heim, Heinrich Moos

Men's épée

- Hans Halberstadt
- Fritz Jack
- Theodor Fischer

Men's team épée

- Theodor Fischer, Fritz Gazzera, Hans Halberstadt, Fritz Jack

Men's sabre

- Erwin Casmir
- Hans Thomson
- Heinrich Moos

Men's team sabre

- Erwin Casmir, Heinrich Moos, Hans Halberstadt, Hans Thomson

Women's foil

- Helene Mayer
- Olga Oelkers
- Erna Sondheim

== Hockey ==
Roster

The following is the Germany roster in the men's field hockey tournament of the 1928 Summer Olympics.

- Bruno Boche
- Georg Brunner
- Heinz Förstendorf
- Erwin Franzkowiak
- Werner Freyberg
- Theodor Haag
- Hans Haußmann
- Kurt Haverbeck
- Aribert Heymann
- Herbert Hobein
- Fritz Horn
- Karl-Heinz Irmer
- Herbert Kemmer
- Herbert Müller
- Werner Proft
- Gerd Strantzen
- Rolf Wollner
- Heinz Wöltje
- Erich Zander
- Fritz Lincke
- Heinz Schäfer
- Kurt Weiß

Group play

Pos	Team	Pld	W	D	L	GF	GA	GD	Pts	Qualification
1	Netherlands (H)	3	2	1	0	8	2	+6	5	Gold medal match
2	Germany	3	2	0	1	8	3	+5	4	Bronze medal match
3	France	3	1	0	2	2	8	−6	2	
4	Spain	3	0	1	2	3	8	−5	1	

Source: 1928 Official Report, p. 689
(H) Hosts

17 May 1928
19:30

Germany	5–1	Spain
Hobein 6', 34'; Boche 20'; Müller 33'; Haag 41'	Report	E. de Chávarri 40'

Olympisch Stadion, Amsterdam
Attendance: 1,300
Umpires:
E. W. C. Ricketts (IND)
P. Regibo (BEL)

19 May 1928
16:00

Netherlands	2–1	Germany
Van de Rovaart 20'; Van der Veen 32'	Report	Haag 7'

Olympisch Stadion, Amsterdam
Attendance: 6,000
Umpires:
R. Liégeois (BEL)
B. Turnbull (IND)

22 May 1928
16:30

Germany	2–0	France
Haag 10', 28'	Report

Old Stadium, Amsterdam
Attendance: 300
Umpires:
R. Liégeois (BEL)
E. de Cindric (HUN)

Bronze Medal Match

26 May 1928
14:00

(bronze) Germany	3–0	Belgium
Haag ?', ?', ?'	Report

Olympisch Stadion, Amsterdam
Attendance: 23,400
Umpires:
B. Turnbull (IND)
W. C. Ricketts (IND)

== Modern pentathlon ==
Three male pentathletes represented Germany in 1928. Helmuth Kahl won a bronze medal.

- Helmuth Kahl
- Heinz Hax
- Hermann Hölter

== Swimming ==
Men

Athlete	Event	Heat		Semifinal		Final	
Athlete	Event	Time	Rank	Time	Rank	Time	Rank
Herbert Heinrich	100 m freestyle	Unknown		Did not advance			
August Heitmann	100 m freestyle	1:02.2		1:03.6		Did not advance	
Karl Schubert	100 m freestyle	1:03.8		Unknown		Did not advance	
Friedel Berges	400 m freestyle	5:27.8		Did not advance			
Walter Handschuhmacher	400 m freestyle	5:32.0		Did not advance			
Herbert Heinrich	400 m freestyle	5:20.0		Unknown		Did not advance	
Walter Handschuhmacher	1500 m freestyle	22:18.6		Did not advance			
Ernst Küppers	100 m backstroke	1:14.0		1:14.2		1:13.8	5
Johann Schulz	100 m backstroke	1:17.2		Did not advance			
Albert Schumberg	100 m backstroke	1:16.6		Did not advance			
Ernst Budig	200 m breaststroke	2:58.6		Did not advance			
Erich Rademacher	200 m breaststroke	2:52.0 OR		2:56.6		2:50.6	2nd place, silver medalist(s)
Erwin Sietas	200 m breaststroke	2:57.4		2:57.8		2:56.6	4
Karl Schubert; August Heitmann; Friedel Berges; Herbert Heinrich	4 × 200 m freestyle relay	—N/a		Unknown		Did not advance	

Women

Athlete	Event	Heat		Semifinal		Final	
Athlete	Event	Time	Rank	Time	Rank	Time	Rank
Reni Erkens	100 m freestyle	1:15.0		Did not advance			
Charlotte Lehmann	100 m freestyle	1:15.6		1:15.8		1:15.2	6
Reni Erkens	400 m freestyle	Unknown		Did not advance			
Charlotte Lehmann	400 m freestyle	6:28.0		Did not advance			
Dora Schönemann	400 m freestyle	6:37.0		Did not advance			
Charlotte Mühe	200 m breaststroke	3:14.2		3:16.8		3:17.6	3rd place, bronze medalist(s)
Hilde Schrader	200 m breaststroke	3:11.6 OR		3:11.2 =WR		3:12.6	1st place, gold medalist(s)
Elfriede Zimmermann	200 m breaststroke	3:18.6		Unknown		Did not advance	
Charlotte Lehmann; Reni Erkens; Herta Wunder; Irmintraut Schneider	4 × 100 m freestyle relay	—N/a		5:19.0		5:14.4	4
