= Turkey at the 1928 Summer Olympics =

- IOC code: TUR
- NOC: Turkish National Olympic Committee

in Amsterdam
- Competitors: 31 in 6 sports
- Officials: Selim Sırrı Tarcan
- Medals: Gold 0 Silver 0 Bronze 0 Total 0

Summer Olympics appearances (overview)
- 1908; 1912; 1920; 1924; 1928; 1932; 1936; 1948; 1952; 1956; 1960; 1964; 1968; 1972; 1976; 1980; 1984; 1988; 1992; 1996; 2000; 2004; 2008; 2012; 2016; 2020; 2024

Other related appearances
- 1906 Intercalated Games

Turkey competed at the 1928 Summer Olympics in Amsterdam, Netherlands. This was the nation's fourth appearance at the Olympics, after debuting in 1908 and not participating in 1920.

31 competitors participated at six sports branches of athletics, cycling, fencing, football, weightlifting and wrestling.

In the Amsterdam Olympics, Turkey received fourth place for the first time ever. Tayyar Yalaz was the Turkish Olympian whose name was listed in the official table of honor, which lists six best contestants in each event. He wrestled in the 67 kg division of Greco-Roman style to come in fourth.

== Athletics ==
Men's 100 m flat

- Mehmet Ali Aybar - Preliminary contest (1st round) 5th series, eliminated
- Semih Türkdoğan - Preliminary contest (1st round) 6th series, eliminated
- Şinasi Şahingiray - Preliminary contest (1st round) 10th series, eliminated
- Enis H. - Preliminary contest (1st round) 16th series, eliminated

Men's 800 m flat

- Ömer Besim Koşalay - Preliminary contest 6th series, eliminated

Men's 1500 m flat

- Ömer Besim Koşalay - Preliminary contest 4th series, eliminated

Men's Running high jump

- Haydar Aşan - Preliminary contest 3rd series, 1.70 m

Men's 400 m relay

- Mehmet Ali Aybar, Semih Türkdoğan, Şinasi Şahingiray, Enis H., Ömer Besim Koşalay - Preliminary contest 3rd series, eliminated

== Cycling ==
Track races

1 km against time

- Galip Cav - 1.22.3 14th place

1 km scratch

- Cavit Cav - Requalifying races 4th series, eliminated

4 km pursuit race

- Galip Cav, Yunus Nüzhet Unat, Cavit Cav, Tacettin Öztürkmen - Preliminary contest (1st round) 3rd series, eliminated

== Fencing ==
Men's sabre

- Nami Yayak - Preliminary contests 4th pool, 6th place
- Muhuttin Okyavuz - Preliminary contests 5th pool, 5th place
- Enver Balkan - Preliminary contests 8th pool, 7th place

Men's team sabre

- Fuat Balkan, Enver Balkan, Muhuttin Okyavuz, Nami Yayak - Semifinals 2nd pool, 4th place

== Football ==
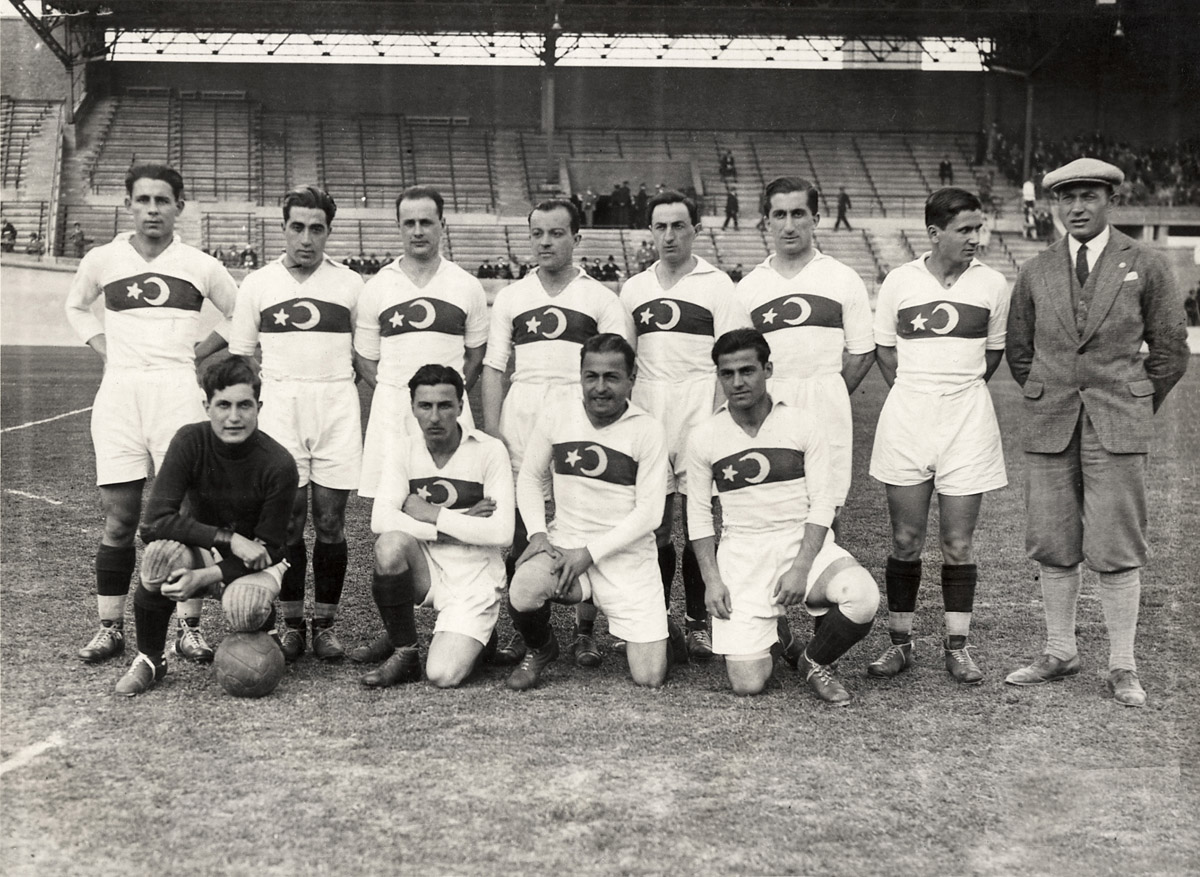
Turkey National Football Team on 28 May 1928.

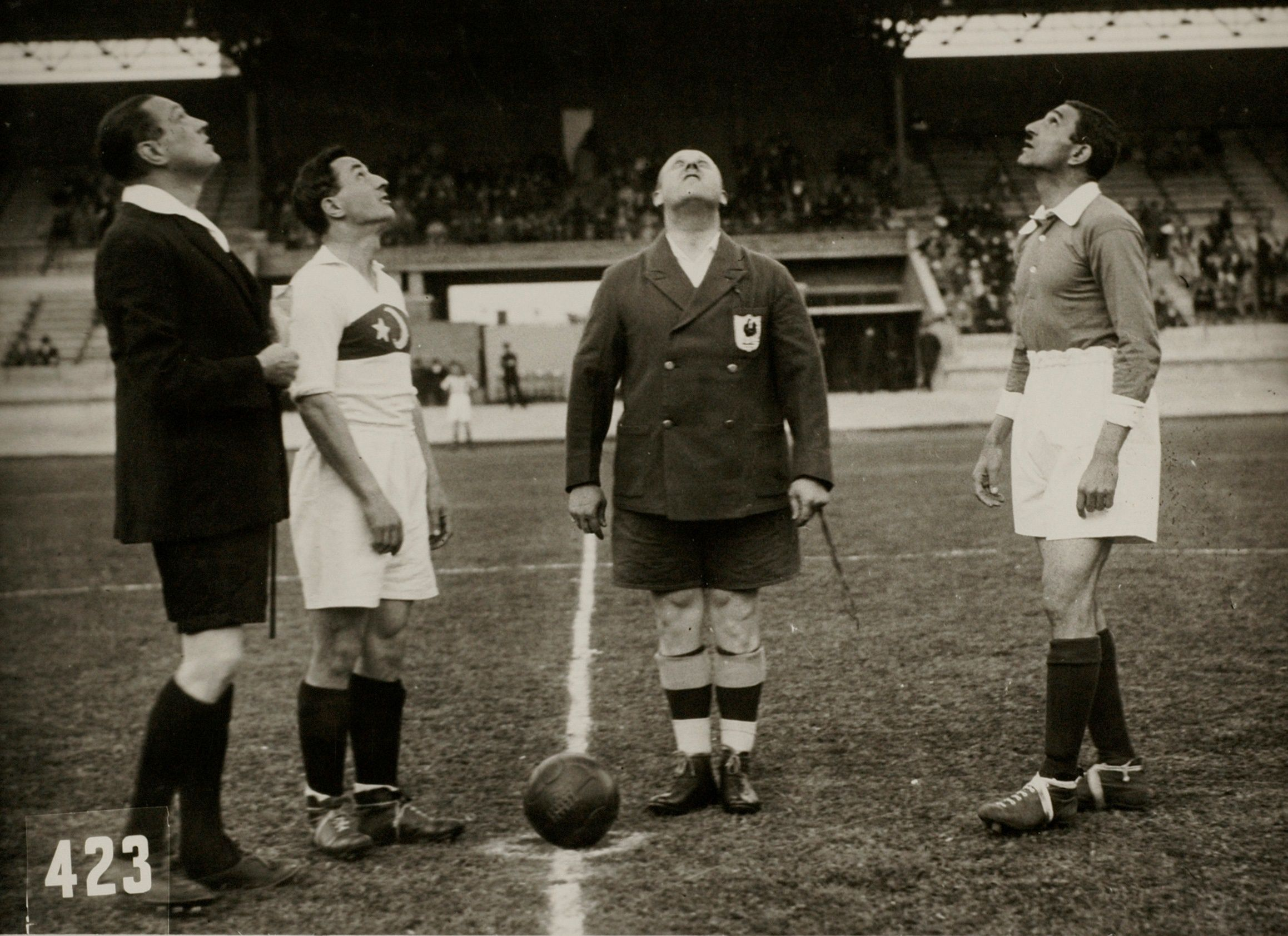
Coin toss between Turkey and Egypt captains on 28 May 1928.

The soccer team was beaten 7-1 by Egypt on May 28, 1928. Baydar scored Turkey's only goal. For Egypt, Moktar El-Tetch scored 3, Gamil El-Zobair scored one, Mohamed Houda scored 2, and Ali Reyadh scored one.

Team: Ulvi Yenal, Kadri Göktulga, Burhan Atak, Cevat Seyit, Nihat Bekdik, İsmet Uluğ, Mehmet Leblebi, Alaattin Baydar, Zeki Rıza Sporel, Bekir Refet, Muslih Peykoğlu (did not play: Bedri Gürsoy, Kemal Faruki, Baron Feyzi, Osman Kaptan, Nafiz Orhun, İzmirli Şevki, Latif Yalınlı, Sabih Arca, Şükrü Erkuş)

== Weightlifting ==
Featherweight

- Cemal Erçman - 262.5 kg 8th place

== Wrestling ==
Men's Greco-Roman style

Bantamweight (- 58 kg)

- Burhan Conkeroğlu - 2nd round, eliminated

Featherweight (58 – 62 kg)

- Saim Arıkan - 4th round, eliminated

Lightweight (62 - 67.5 kg)

- Tayyar Yalaz - 4th place

Middleweight (67.5 – 75 kg)

- Nuri Boytorun - 4th round, eliminated

Light heavyweight (75 - 82.5 kg)

- Şefik Ahmet Yigner - 2nd round, eliminated

Heavyweight (+ 82.5 kg)

- Mehmet Çoban - 3rd round, eliminated
