= Deaths in July 1999 =

The following is a list of notable deaths in July 1999.

Entries for each day are listed alphabetically by surname. A typical entry lists information in the following sequence:

- Name, age, country of citizenship at birth, subsequent country of citizenship (if applicable), reason for notability, cause of death (if known), and reference.

== July 1999 ==
=== 1 ===
- Dennis Brown, 42, Jamaican reggae singer, pneumothorax.
- Edward Dmytryk, 90, Canadian-American film director, heart and kidney failure.
- Forrest Mars, 95, American businessman and candy magnate.
- Guy Mitchell, 72, American traditional pop singer and actor, complications from surgery.
- Jack Moroney, 81, Australian cricket player.
- Ernst Nievergelt, 89, Swiss cyclist and Olympic medalist (1936).
- Joshua Nkomo, 82, Zimbabwean politician, prostate cancer.
- Sylvia Sidney, 88, American film actress (Summer Wishes, Winter Dreams, Beetlejuice, An Early Frost), oesophageal cancer.
- Roman Tmetuchl, 73, Palauan political leader.
- Stig Westerberg, 80, Swedish conductor and pianist.
- Willie Whitelaw, 81, British politician.

=== 2 ===
- Andrey Bogdanov, 41, Soviet Russian Olympic swimmer (1976).
- Viktor Chebrikov, 76, Soviet head of the KGB (1982–1988).
- George Deiderich, 63, American football player.
- George Druxman, 69, Canadian football player.
- Xavier Gélin, 53, French actor and film producer, cancer.
- Jack Plumley, 88, British Anglican priest, egyptologist and academic.
- Mario Puzo, 78, American novelist (The Godfather) and screenwriter (Superman, The Cotton Club), Oscar winner (1973, 1975), heart failure.
- Louis Rosenberg, 100, American district judge (United States District Court for the Western District of Pennsylvania).
- Howie Ruetz, 71, American football player (Green Bay Packers).
- Asoka Weeraratna, 80, Sri Lankan (Sinhala) Buddhist missionary.

=== 3 ===
- Reg Bishop, 86, Australian politician.
- Ricky Byrdsong, 43, American basketball coach and killing spree victim, shot.
- Yueh Feng, 90, Chinese film director and screenwriter.
- Ibragim Gasanbekov, 29, Azerbaijani football player, traffic collision.
- Frank Linskey, 85, American basketball player and coach.
- Mimi Nelson, 76, Swedish film actress.
- Manoj Kumar Pandey, 24, Indian military officer.
- Roberto Peper, 86, Argentine Olympic swimmer (1932).
- Pelageya Polubarinova-Kochina, 100, Soviet and Russian mathematician.
- Paulo Porto, 81, Brazilian actor, film producer, director and screenwriter.
- Mark Sandman, 46, American musician (Morphine), heart attack.
- Jack Vincent, 95, English ornithologist.

=== 4 ===
- Ronny Graham, 79, American actor, theater director, and writer, liver disease.
- Georg Johansen, 75, Norwegian Olympic gymnast (1952).
- Ruby Johnson, 63, American soul singer.
- Walter Legel, 59, Austrian Olympic weightlifter (1960, 1972, 1976, 1980).
- Mark O'Brien, 49, American journalist, poet, and disability rights advocate.
- Jack Watson, 84, English actor, leukemia.

=== 5 ===
- Len Butterfield, 85, New Zealand cricket player.
- Jean-Pierre Darras, 71, French actor, cancer.
- Joan Kemp-Welch, 92, British stage and film actress.
- Karnal Sher Khan, 29, Pakistani military officer.
- C. Walton Lillehei, 80, American surgeon and open-heart surgery pioneer.
- Harald Philipp, 78, German film director, screenwriter and actor.
- Roberta Sherwood, 86, American singer.
- Thea Tewi, 97, German-American sculptor and lingerie designer.

=== 6 ===
- Bernardo Gandulla, 83, Argentine football player and coach.
- Gary M. Heidnik, 55, American convicted murderer, execution by lethal injection.
- Joe Hyman, 77, British textile entrepreneur.
- M. L. Jaisimha, 60, Indian cricket player, lung cancer.
- Pisith Pilika, 34, Cambodian ballet dancer and actress, shot.
- Joaquín Rodrigo, 97, Spanish composer and pianist.
- Sherley Anne Williams, 54, American novelist, poet and professor.
- Barry Winchell, 21, United States Army infantry soldier, bludgeoned.

=== 7 ===
- Vikram Batra, 24, Indian Army officer.
- Riccardo Cerutti, 77, Italian rower and Olympian (1948).
- Emilio Sánchez Font, 78, Cuban-American artist.
- James Gahagan, American abstract expressionist painter.
- Brima Kamara, 27, Sierra Leonean football player.
- Ryu Mitsuse, 71, Japanese novelist, science fiction writer, and essayist.
- Richard Müller, 95, German chemist.
- Anuj Nayyar, 23, Indian Army officer.
- Julie Campbell Tatham, 91, American writer of children's novels.

=== 8 ===
- Ángel Lulio Cabrera, 90, Argentinian botanist.
- Adolf Christian, 65, Austrian bicycle racer.
- Mavis Thorpe Clark, 90, Australian novelist and writer for children.
- Pete Conrad, 69, American astronaut (Gemini 5, Gemini 11, Apollo 12, Skylab 2), traffic collision.
- Allen Lee Davis, 54, American murderer, execution by electric chair.
- Atilio Ensunza, 62, Argentine Olympic rower (1964).
- Oliver Gasch, 93, American district judge (United States District Court for the District of Columbia).
- Kenneth Keller Hall, 81, American judge.
- Frank Lubin, 89, Lithuanian-American basketball player and Olympian (1936).
- Malcolm Mackay, 79, Australian politician, traffic collision.
- Robert Morrison, 90, American attorney and politician.
- Elemér Terták, 80, Hungarian figure skater and Olympian (1936).
- Shafik Wazzan, 74, Lebanese politician.
- Mehdi Haeri Yazdi, 76, Iranian philosopher and Shia Islamic cleric.

=== 9 ===
- Karl Adam, 75, German football player.
- Robert de Cotret, 55, Canadian politician.
- Ingenuino Dallagio, 89, Italian Olympic skier (1932).
- James L. Farmer, Jr., 79, American civil rights activist, complications from diabetes.
- Bill Hindman, 76, American actor (Porky's).
- Esme Mackinnon, 85, British alpine skier and world champion downhill and slalom.
- Samuel Sanders, 62, American classical pianist.
- Donald Shearer, 90, English sportsman and Olympian (1936).

=== 10 ===
- Ludwik Czachowski, 55, Polish ice hockey player and Olympian (1972).
- John Scott-Ellis, 9th Baron Howard de Walden, 86, British peer and thoroughbred racehorse owner/breeder.
- Walter R. Evans, 79, American control theorist.
- Gil Johnson, 75, American gridiron football player.
- Ulla Lindström, 89, Swedish journalist and politician.

=== 11 ===
- Rie Briejèr, 89, Dutch Olympic sprinter (1928).
- James Davies, 93, Canadian Olympic cyclist (1928).
- Burton Dreben, 71, American philosopher.
- Marcelo Fernan, 72, Filipino lawyer and politician, Chief Justice of the Supreme Court of the Philippines.
- Helen Forrest, 82, American singer of traditional pop and swing music, heart failure.
- Everett Greenbaum, 79, American television and film writer and actor.
- Henry Kimbro, 87, American Negro league baseball player.
- Lasse Lindroth, 26, Iranian-Swedish comedian, actor and writer, traffic collision.
- Roaring Lion, 91, Trinidad and Tobago calypso singer and composer.
- John Henry Sharpe, 77, Bermudian politician, Premier (1975-1975).
- Shirley Weierman, 61, American baseball player.

=== 12 ===
- Bill Flett, 55, Canadian hockey player, liver failure.
- Alex Gordon, 82, Welsh architect.
- Harvey Jackins, 83, American founder and principal theorist of Re-evaluation Counseling.
- Rajendra Kumar, 69, Indian film actor, cancer.
- Herbert Frazier Murray, 75, American attorney and judge.
- Mircea Nedelciu, 48, Romanian short-story writer, novelist and essayist, Hodgkin's disease.
- Kazimierz Ostrowski, 82, Polish painter.
- Bill Owen, 85, British actor and songwriter, pancreatic cancer.
- Jan Panenka, 77, Czech pianist.
- Zita Szeleczky, 84, Hungarian actress.
- Cornelius Wiebe, 106, Canadian physician and politician.
- Édouard Yves, 91, Belgian Olympic fencer (1928, 1948, 1952).

=== 13 ===
- Manuel Aramayo, 43, Bolivian Olympic alpine skier (1988, 1992).
- Detlow von Braun, 87, Swedish Olympic sailor (1936).
- Bert Burry, 93, Canadian ice hockey player (Ottawa Senators).
- Donald D. Engen, 75, American naval officer, administrator of the FAA, and museum director, gliding accident.
- Muhammetnazar Gapurow, 77, First Secretary of the Communist Party of the Turkmen SSR (1969 – 1985).
- Yevgeny Goryansky, 70, Russian football player and football coach.
- Herta Heuwer, 86, German chef and inventor of the currywurst.
- Josef Moc, 91, Czechoslovak Olympic basketball player (1936).
- Irene Ruhnke, 79, American baseball player.

=== 14 ===
- Maria Banuș, 85, Romanian poet, essayist, and prose writer.
- Hugh Gallarneau, 82, American gridiron football player (Chicago Bears).
- Gene Hart, 68, American sportscaster for the Philadelphia Flyers, kidney and liver failure.
- Władysław Hasior, 71, Polish sculptor.
- Abdul Ahad Karzai, 77, Afghan politician, assassination.
- Vasile Mariuțan, 64, Romanian boxer and Olympian (1960, 1964).
- Umyar Mavlikhanov, 61, Soviet fencer and Olympic champion (1960, 1964, 1968).
- Gar Samuelson, 41, American drummer (Megadeth), liver failure.
- Trudi Schoop, 95, Swiss-American dance therapy pioneer.
- John R. Steelman, 99, American academic and first White House Chief of Staff.
- Pietro Tarchini, 77, Swiss professional cyclist.
- Sal Trapani, 72, American comic-book artist.
- Sadao Yamahana, 63, Japanese politician.

=== 15 ===
- Sir Richard Thompson, 1st Baronet, 86, British politician.
- George Brown, 79, American politician, Member of the United States House of Representatives (1963-1971, 1973-), complications following heart surgery.
- Simon Ramsay, 16th Earl of Dalhousie, 84, British land owner, politician and colonial governor.
- Horacio Podestá, 87, Argentine rower and Olympic medalist (1936).
- Dick Richardson, 65, Welsh heavyweight boxer, cancer.
- Kamalendumati Shah, Indian politician and social worker, brain cancer.
- Hub Wilson, 90, Canadian ice hockey player (New York Americans).

=== 16 ===
- Ross H. Arnett, Jr., 80, American entomologist.
- Carolyn Bessette-Kennedy, 33, American socialite and wife of John F. Kennedy Jr., plane crash.
- John F. Kennedy Jr., 38, American journalist, lawyer, and son of John F. Kennedy and Jacqueline Kennedy Onassis, plane crash.
- Alan Macnaughton, 95, Canadian parliamentarian and Speaker of the House.
- André Martinet, 91, French linguist.
- Franco Montoro, 83, Brazilian politician and lawyer.
- Hamid Nitgi, 78, Iranian poet, writer and author.
- Alfred Raoul, 60, Congolese politician, Prime Minister (1968-1969).
- Whit Wyatt, 91, American baseball player, pneumonia.
- Hiromi Yanagihara, 19, Japanese singer and actress, heart failure.

=== 17 ===
- Rajendra Kumari Bajpai, 74, Indian politician.
- Arthur Hoag, 78, American astronomer.
- Daniel H. H. Ingalls, Sr., 83, American professor of Sanskrit.
- Donal McCann, 56, Irish actor, pancreatic cancer.
- Kevin Newman, 65, Australian soldier and politician, systemic lupus erythematosus.
- Kevin Wilkinson, 41, English drummer, suicide by hanging.
- Patricia Zipprodt, 74, American costume designer, cancer.

=== 18 ===
- Meir Ariel, 57, Israeli singer-songwriter, boutonneuse fever.
- Rubén Bernuncio, 23, Argentine football player, renal failure following traffic collision.
- Donald Eugene Chambers, 68, American marine and founder of the Bandidos Motorcycle Club.
- Woody Davis, 86, American baseball player (Detroit Tigers).
- Jatin Kanakia, 46, Indian actor.
- Pavel Pulda, 50, Czech Olympic sports shooter (1976, 1980).
- Pandi Raidhi, 68, Albanian film and theatre actor.
- Laurie Scott, 82, English footballer.
- Tody Smith, 50, American gridiron football player (Dallas Cowboys, Houston Oilers, Buffalo Bills).

=== 19 ===
- Donna Allen, 78, American pioneer feminist, civil rights activist, historian and economist.
- Jesús Codina, 60, Spanish Olympic basketball player (1960, 1968).
- Cavernario Galindo, 75, Mexican luchador and film actor.
- Ludwik Gross, 94, Polish-American virologist, stomach cancer.
- José Luis Madrid, 66, Spanish screenwriter, producer and film director.
- Hans Maldonado, 41, Ecuadorian football player.
- Ingulf Nossek, 55, German Olympic water polo player (1972).
- Jerold Wells, 90, English actor.
- Doreen Yarwood, 81, English historian and architecture critic.

=== 20 ===
- Emil Andres, 88, American racecar driver.
- Sandra Gould, 82, American film and television actor (Bewitched) and writer, complications from surgery.
- Peggy Johnson, 23, American murder victim.
- Jean-Jacques Lamboley, 78, French cyclist.
- Chuck Mahoney, 79, American racing driver.
- James Muirhead, 74, Australian judge and Royal Commissioner.

=== 21 ===
- Kurt Burris, 67, American gridiron football player.
- Peter Carter, 69, British children's author.
- Jun Etō, 66, Japanese literary critic, suicide by exsanguination.
- David Ogilvy, 88, British advertising tycoon, the "Father of Advertising".
- Kim Pyong-sik, 80, North Korean politician.
- Enrique Rebora, 74, Argentine Olympic sports shooter (1972).

=== 22 ===
- Gennadiy Agapov, 65, Soviet and Russian race walker and Olympian (1964, 1968).
- Abelardo Díaz Alfaro, 82, Puerto Rican author.
- Howard Arkley, 48, Australian artist, accidental overdose.
- Claudio Rodríguez García, 65, Spanish poet.
- Camillo Gargano, 57, Italian Olympic sailor (1968).
- Hakim Abdul Hameed, 90, Indian physician and university chancellor.
- Mary Kerridge, 85, English actress and theatre director.
- Lauro Ortega Martínez, 89, Mexican politician and veterinarian.
- Ladislav Slovák, 79, Slovak conductor.
- Arun Thapa, Nepali singer and songwriter, lung and liver ailment.

=== 23 ===
- Reinholdt Christensen, 83, Danish footballer.
- Hassan II, 70, Moroccan monarch, King of Morocco (since 1961), heart attack.
- Josef Holub, 69, Czech botanist and pteridologist, heart attack.
- Frank Minis Johnson, 80, United States district judge, pneumonia.
- Kelvin Lancaster, 74, Australian mathematical economist.
- Paul Lucier, 68, Canadian businessman and politician, bone cancer.
- Emma Tenayuca, 82, Mexican American labor leader, and educator, Alzheimer's disease.
- Dmitri Tertyshny, 22, Russian ice hockey defenseman (Philadelphia Flyers), boating accident.
- Stanley Tretick, 78, American photojournalist.

=== 24 ===
- Alexander Abian, 76, Iranian-born Armenian-American mathematician.
- Walter Barfuss, 44, German bobsledder and Olympian (1980).
- Le Quang Dao, 77, Vietnamese politician.
- Eva de Vitray-Meyerovitch, 89, French scientist, translator and writer.
- Demetrius DuBose, 28, American football player (Tampa Bay Buccaneers), shot by police.
- Albert Leake, 69, English footballer.
- Bijaya Malla, 74, Nepalese poet, novelist and playwright.
- Don Martin, 79, American basketball player and coach.
- Rona McKenzie, 76, New Zealand cricket player.
- Henk Pellikaan, 88, Dutch football player.

=== 25 ===
- Martin Agronsky, 84, American journalist and television host, congestive heart failure.
- Jewett Campbell, 86, American painter, educator
- Princess Iskander, 82, last member of the Russian House of Romanov.
- Diane Lacombe, 22, French Olympic swimmer (1992).
- Pentti Lammio, 79, Finnish speed skater and Olympic medalist (1948, 1952).
- Raul Manglapus, 80, Filipino politician, throat cancer.
- Gisèle Meygret, 35, French Olympic fencer (1988, 1992).
- Jan Richter, 76, Czech Olympic ice hockey player (1952).

=== 26 ===
- Walter Jackson Bate, 81, American literary critic and biographer.
- Béla Bay, 92, Hungarian Olympic épée and foil fencer (1936, 1948).
- Philippa Gail, 56, British actress, cancer.
- Phaedon Gizikis, 82, Greek army general and president under the Junta.
- Alan Karcher, 56, American politician.
- Qian Linzhao, 92, Chinese physicist.
- Joseph Morvan, 74, French road bicycle racer.
- Paul Rickards, 73, American gridiron football player (Los Angeles Rams).
- John W. N. Watkins, 74, English philosopher and professor of Economics, heart attack.

=== 27 ===
- Aleksandr Aleksandrov, 86, Soviet/Russian mathematician, physicist and philosopher.
- Ronald Backus, 77, British sailor and Olympic medalist (1956).
- Brandur Brynjólfsson, 82, Icelandic footballer.
- Bob Carse, 80, Canadian ice hockey player (Chicago Black Hawks, Montreal Canadiens).
- Matjaž Cvikl, 32, Slovenian football player, cancer.
- Louis Déprez, 78, French racing cyclist.
- Harry Edison, 83, American jazz trumpeter.
- Amaryllis Fleming, 73, British cello performer and teacher.
- Elías Jácome, 53, Ecuadorian football referee.
- Armand Le Moal, 85, French racing cyclist.
- Mahlathini, 61, South African mbaqanga singer, complications of diabetes.
- Malachi Martin, 78, Irish-American Catholic priest and novelist, fall.
- Yunus Nüzhet Unat, 85, Turkish Olympic cyclist (1928).
- Michael Winkelman, 53, American child actor (The Real McCoys).

=== 28 ===
- Doris Carter, 87, Australian military officer, public servant, and Olympic athlete (1936).
- Ed Cole, 90, American baseball player (St. Louis Browns).
- Trygve Haavelmo, 87, Norwegian economist.
- Erik Holm, 87, Swedish Olympic water polo player (1936, 1948, 1952).
- Agustín Mestres, 76, Spanish Olympic water polo player (1948, 1952).
- Maxim Munzuk, 89, Tuvan actor.
- Francisco Risiglione, 82, Argentine boxer and Olympic medalist (1936).
- Carlos Romero, 71, Uruguayan football player.
- Gerd Springer, 72, Austrian football player, coach, and Olympian (1956).
- Puey Ungpakorn, 83, Thai economist.
- S. Howard Woodson, 83, American pastor, civil rights leader and politician.

=== 29 ===
- Anita Carter, 66, American singer and member of the Carter family, complications of rheumatoid arthritis.
- Don Garlin, 72, American football player (San Francisco 49ers).
- Martti Kosma, 72, Finnish football player and manager.
- Anatoliy Solovyanenko, 66, Soviet operatic tenor, heart attack.
- André Soubiran, 89, French physician and novelist.
- Neelan Tiruchelvam, 55, Sri Lankan Tamil lawyer, academic and politician, assassinated.
- Kunio Tsuji, 73, Japanese author, novelist, and scholar.

=== 30 ===
- Ko Tai Chuen, 74, Singaporean Olympic basketball player (1956).
- Jules Mackowiak, 83, French Olympic canoeist (1936).
- George Moorse, 63, American-German film director, heart attack.
- Hermann Panzo, 41, French athlete and Olympian (1980), stroke.
- Linus Suryadi AG, 48, Indonesian writer and poet.

=== 31 ===
- Mirza Adeeb, 85, Pakistani playwright and short story writer.
- Marinus Kok, 83, Dutch prelate of the Catholic Church.
- Gunnar Pedersen, 74, Danish Olympic gymnast (1952).
- Rex Pilbeam, 91, Australian politician.
- Ambrosio Rocha, 76, Brazilian Olympic sports shooter (1960).
- Henry W. Sawyer, 80, American lawyer, civil rights activist and politician, lung cancer.
- Max Seela, 88, German Waffen-SS officer.
- Elena Zareschi, 83, Italian actress.
