= Cycling at the 1928 Summer Olympics =

Cycling at the Games of the IX Olympiad
- Venues: Amsterdam and surrounding area Amsterdam Olympic Stadium
- Date: 4 –6 August 1928
- Competitors: 149 from 27 nations

The cycling competition at the 1928 Summer Olympics in Amsterdam consisted of two road cycling events and four track cycling events, all for men only. The individual event in road cycling was a time trial over a distance of 168 km; the team competition was decided by aggregating the times of the three fastest riders from each nation. The 50 km track event held in 1920 and 1924 was replaced by a 1 km time trial.

== Medal summary ==
=== Road cycling ===
Games	Gold	Silver	Bronze
Individual time trial	Henry Hansen; Denmark	Frank Southall; Great Britain	Gösta Carlsson; Sweden
Team time trial	Denmark; Henry Hansen; Orla Jørgensen; Leo Nielsen	Great Britain; Jack Lauterwasser; John Middleton; Frank Southall	Sweden; Gösta Carlsson; Erik Jansson; Georg Johnsson

=== Track cycling ===
Games	Gold	Silver	Bronze
Pursuit, Team	Italy; Cesare Facciani; Giacomo Gaioni; Mario Lusiani; Luigi Tasselli	Netherlands; Johannes Maas; Piet van der Horst; Janus Braspennincx; Jan Pijnenburg	Great Britain; George Southall; Harry Wyld; Leonard Wyld; Percy Wyld
Sprint	Roger Beaufrand; France	Antoine Mazairac; Netherlands	Willy Hansen; Denmark
Tandem	Bernhard Leene and Daan van Dijk; Netherlands	Ernest Chambers and John Sibbit; Great Britain	Hans Bernhardt and Karl Köther; Germany
Track time trial	Willy Hansen; Denmark	Gerard Bosch van Drakestein; Netherlands	Dunc Gray; Australia

== Participating nations ==
149 cyclists from 27 nations competed. Ireland, Spain, and Turkey competed in cycling for the first time.

- Argentina (6)
- Australia (2)
- Austria (2)
- Belgium (8)
- Canada (6)
- Chile (5)
- Czechoslovakia (4)
- Denmark (5)
- Finland (1)

- France (8)
- Germany (10)
- Great Britain (12)
- Ireland (2)
- Italy (12)
- Latvia (5)
- Lithuania (4)
- Luxembourg (4)
- Netherlands (11)

- Norway (4)
- Poland (11)
- South Africa (1)
- Spain (1)
- Sweden (4)
- Switzerland (9)
- Turkey (4)
- United States (4)
- Yugoslavia (4)

== Medal table ==
Rank	Nation	Gold	Silver	Bronze	Total
1	Denmark	3	0	1	4
2	Netherlands	1	3	0	4
3	France	1	0	0	1
3	Italy	1	0	0	1
5	Great Britain	0	3	1	4
6	Sweden	0	0	2	2
7	Australia	0	0	1	1
7	Germany	0	0	1	1
Totals (8 entries)		6	6	6	18

== See also ==
- List of cycling tracks and velodromes
