= Cycling at the 1928 Summer Olympics – Men's individual time trial =

Men's cycling time trial at the Games of the IX Olympiad
- Venue: Amsterdam
- Date: 7 August 1928
- Competitors: 75 from 21 nations
- Winning time: 4:47:18

Medalists
1st place, gold medalist(s)		Henry Hansen	Denmark
2nd place, silver medalist(s)		Frank Southall	Great Britain
3rd place, bronze medalist(s)		Gösta Carlsson	Sweden

The men's individual time trial, a part of the cycling events at the 1928 Summer Olympics, took place in Amsterdam. The race was won by the Danish rider Henry Hansen in 4 hours, 47 minutes, 18 seconds.

The results were also used to determine rankings for the team road race event.

== Final classification ==
Source: Official results

Rank	Cyclist	Nation	Time
1st place, gold medalist(s)	Henry Hansen	Denmark	4:47:18
2nd place, silver medalist(s)	Frank Southall	Great Britain	4:55:06
3rd place, bronze medalist(s)	Gösta Carlsson	Sweden	5:00:17
4	Allegro Grandi	Italy	5:02:05
5	Jack Lauterwasser	Great Britain	5:02:57
6	Gottlieb Amstein	Switzerland	5:04:48
7	Leo Nielsen	Denmark	5:05:37
8	André Aumerle	France	5:07:12
9	Jakob Caironi	Switzerland	5:08:46
10	Raul Hellberg	Finland	5:09:14
11	Jean Aerts	Belgium	5:10:38
12	Pierre Houdé	Belgium	5:11:18
13	Jef Lowagie	Belgium	5:11:54
14	Erik Jansson	Sweden	5:13:17
15	Cosme Saavedra	Argentina	5:13:19
16	Michele Orecchia	Italy	5:13:29
17	Leen Buis	Netherlands	5:14:15
17	Georg Johnsson	Sweden	5:14:15
19	Fred Short	South Africa	5:14:38
20	Francisco Bonvehi	Argentina	5:14:39
21	José López	Argentina	5:14:57
22	Louis Bessière	France	5:15:14
23	Octave Dayen	France	5:15:54
24	Jean Chaerels	Belgium	5:16:05
25	Orla Jørgensen	Denmark	5:16:19
26	John Middleton	Great Britain	5:16:46
27	Janus Braspennincx	Netherlands	5:17:07
28	Poul Sørensen	Denmark	5:17:33
29	Ambrogio Beretta	Italy	5:17:38
30	Marcello Neri	Italy	5:21:12
31	Joe Laporte	Canada	5:21:30
32	Hjalmar Pettersson	Sweden	5:21:46
33	Gottlieb Wanzenried	Switzerland	5:21:47
34	Jean-Pierre Muller	Luxembourg	5:22:30
35	Gustav Kristiansen	Norway	5:23:14
36	Ben Duijker	Netherlands	5:23:22
37	Josip Šolar	Yugoslavia	5:25:37
38	Charles Marshall	Great Britain	5:26:39
39	Antonín Honig	Czechoslovakia	5:27:45
40	Norbert Sinner	Luxembourg	5:27:54
41	Luis de Meyer	Argentina	5:28:48
42	Jean Alfonsetti	Luxembourg	5:30:31
43	Karl Hansen	Norway	5:30:33
44	John Woodcock	Ireland	5:32:54
45	Karl Koch	Germany	5:33:32
46	Antonín Perič	Czechoslovakia	5:34:30
46	Josef Šídlo	Czechoslovakia	5:34:30
48	Stjepan Ljubić	Yugoslavia	5:37:02
49	Eugeniusz Michalak	Poland	5:37:02
50	Tarhumas Murnikas	Lithuania	5:41:00
51	Chester Nelsen Sr.	United States	5:42:57
52	René Brossy	France	5:46:06
53	Josip Škrabl	Yugoslavia	5:46:14
54	Józef Stefański	Poland	5:47:15
55	Jurgis Gedminas	Lithuania	5:50:04
56	Alfred Tourville	Canada	5:51:05
57	Stanisław Kłosowicz	Poland	5:51:31
58	Henry O'Brien	United States	5:53:23
59	Ladislav Brůžek	Czechoslovakia	5:54:07
60	Antun Banek	Yugoslavia	5:55:27
61	Józef Popowski	Poland	5:55:39
62	Peter Smessaert	United States	5:56:32
63	William Peden	Canada	6:09:26
–	Ragnvald Martinsen	Norway	DNF
–	Reidar Raaen	Norway	DNF
–	Anton Kuys	Netherlands	DNF
–	Vladas Jankauskas	Lithuania	DNF
–	Isakas Anolikas	Lithuania	DNF
–	Lew Elder	Canada	DNF
–	Arthur Essing	Germany	DNF
–	Bernhard Stübecke	Germany	DNF
–	Charles Westerholm	United States	DNF
–	Paul Litschi	Switzerland	DNF
–	Marcel Pesch	Luxembourg	DNF
–	Otto Kürschner	Germany	DNF
