= Cycling at the 1928 Summer Olympics – Men's team pursuit =

Men's team pursuit at the Games of the IX Olympiad
- Venue: Olympic Stadium
- Competitors: 48 from 12 nations

Medalists
1st place, gold medalist(s)		Italy; Cesare Facciani, Giacomo Gaioni, Mario Lusiani, Luigi Tasselli
2nd place, silver medalist(s)		Netherlands; Johannes Maas, Piet van der Horst, Janus Braspennincx, Jan Pijnenburg
3rd place, bronze medalist(s)		Great Britain; George Southall, Harry Wyld, Leonard Wyld, Percy Wyld

The men's team pursuit at the 1928 Summer Olympics took place at the Olympic Stadium in Amsterdam.

This track cycling event consisted of multiple rounds. Cyclists competed in teams of four. The event was a single elimination tournament, with a third-place race between the semifinal losers.

== Team rosters ==
Belgium

- August Meuleman
- Yves Van Massenhove
- Albert Muylle
- Jean Van Buggenhout

Canada

- Lew Elder
- James Davies
- Andy Houting
- William Peden

Chile

- Jorge Gamboa
- Alejandro Vidal
- Carlos Rocuant
- Edmond Maillard

France

- Aimé Trantoul
- Octave Dayen
- René Brossy
- André Trantoul

Germany

- Josef Steger
- Anton Joksch
- Kurt Einsiedel
- Hans Dormbach

Great Britain

- Harry Wyld
- Lew Wyld
- Percy Wyld
- George Southall

Italy

- Cesare Facciani
- Giacomo Gaioni
- Luigi Tasselli
- Mario Lusiani

Latvia

- Roberts Ozols
- Zenons Popovs
- Ernests Mālers
- Fridrihs Ukstiņš

Netherlands

- Jan Maas
- Jan Pijnenburg
- Janus Braspennincx
- Piet van der Horst

Poland

- Józef Lange
- Alfred Reul
- Jan Zybert
- Józef Oksiutycz

Switzerland

- Erich Fäs
- Gustave Moos
- Heinz Gilgen
- Joseph Fischler

Turkey

- Galip Cav
- Yunus Nüzhet Unat
- Cavit Cav
- Tacettin Öztürkmen

== Match round ==
=== Round 1 ===
Match 1

Rank	Nation
1 Q	Belgium
2 q	Poland

Match 2

Rank	Nation
1 Q	France
2	Chile

Match 3

Rank	Nation
1 Q	Great Britain
2	Turkey

Match 4

Rank	Nation
1 Q	Italy
2	Latvia

Match 5

Rank	Nation
1 Q	Netherlands
2	Switzerland

Match 6

Rank	Nation
1 Q	Germany
2 q	Canada

=== Round 2 ===
Match 1

Rank	Nation
1 Q	Great Britain
2	Belgium

Match 2

Rank	Nation
1 Q	Netherlands
2	Poland

Match 3

Rank	Nation
1 Q	France
2	Canada

Match 4

Rank	Nation
1 Q	Italy
2	Germany

=== Semifinals ===
Semifinal 1

Rank	Nation
1 Q	Italy
2	Great Britain

Semifinal 2

Rank	Nation
1 Q	Netherlands
2	France

=== Medal matches ===
Gold medal match

Rank	Nation	Time
Gold medal	Italy	5:01.8
Silver medal	Netherlands	5:06.2

Bronze medal match

Rank	Nation
1	Great Britain
2 (4th)	France
