= Cycling at the 1928 Summer Olympics – Men's track time trial =

Men's track time trial at the Games of the IX Olympiad
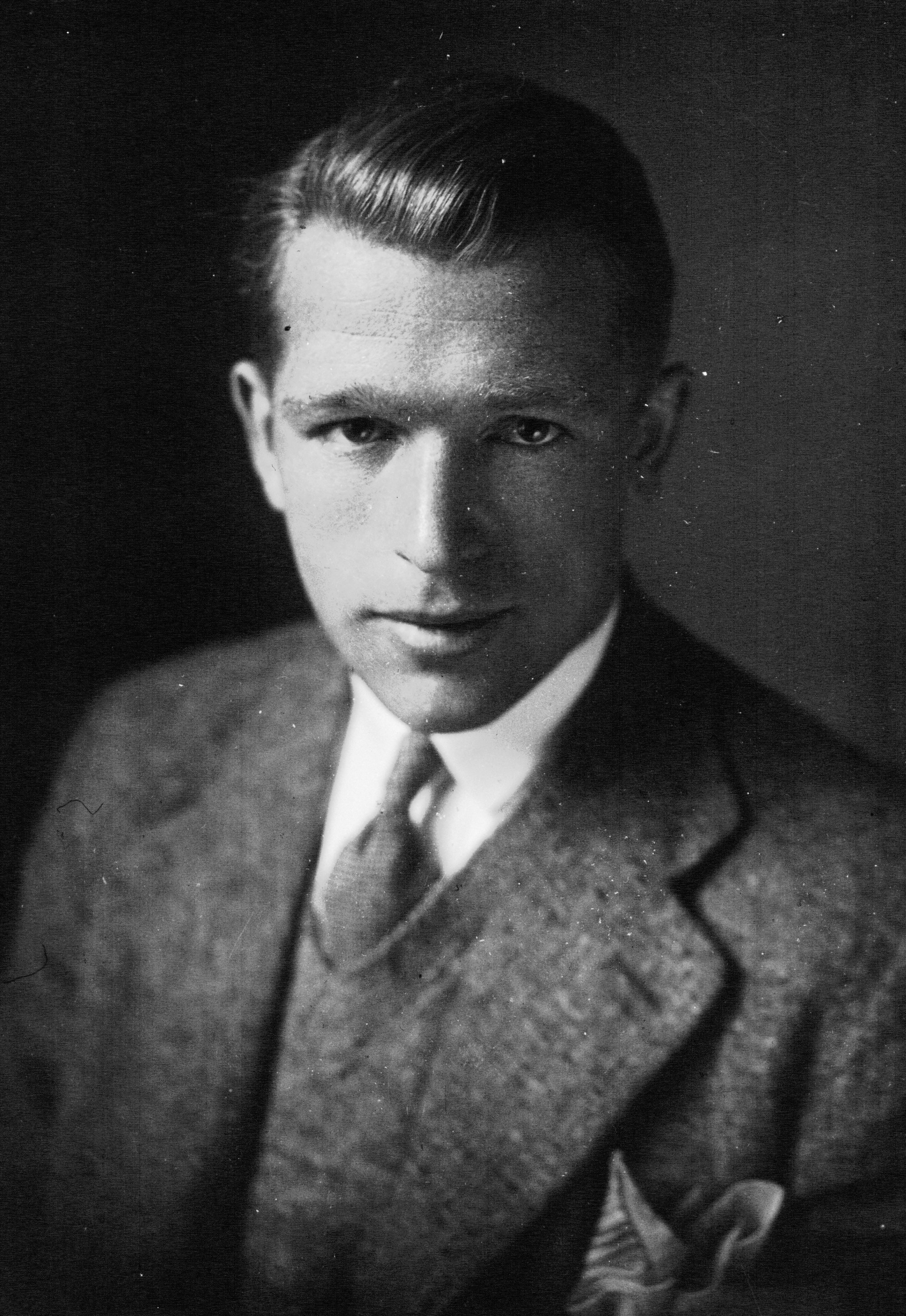
- Willy Hansen
- Venue: Olympic Stadium
- Date: 5 August 1928
- Competitors: 16 from 16 nations
- Winning time: 1:14.4 OR

Medalists
1st place, gold medalist(s)		Willy Hansen; Denmark
2nd place, silver medalist(s)		Gerard Bosch van Drakestein; Netherlands
3rd place, bronze medalist(s)		Dunc Gray; Australia

The men's track time trial, one of the cycling events at the 1928 Summer Olympics, was held at the Olympic Stadium in Amsterdam. Sixteen cyclists from 16 nations competed, with each nation limited to a single entrant. The race distance was 1 kilometre. The event was won by the Danish cyclist Willy Hansen in 1 minute, 14.4 seconds. Gerard Bosch van Drakestein of the Netherlands claimed the silver medal, while Dunc Gray of Australia earned bronze. It was the first medal for each of the three nations in the men's track time trial; none had competed in the 1896 edition.

== Background ==
This was the second appearance of the event, which had previously been held in 1896. It would be held every Games until being dropped from the programme after 2004. The event was a "new event" in track cycling, "supposedly popular in Italy."

Twelve of the 16 competing nations made their debut in the event: Argentina, Australia, Belgium, Canada, Chile, Denmark, Ireland, Italy, the Netherlands, Poland, Switzerland, and Turkey. The four returning nations were Austria, France, Germany, and Great Britain.

== Competition format ==
The event was a time trial on the track, with each cyclist competing separately to attempt to achieve the fastest time. Unlike in 1896, the competition used a standing start. The distance was also increased to one kilometre rather than the one-third of a kilometre used previously.

== Records ==
There were no standing world or Olympic records prior to the 1928 Summer Olympics; world records were not ratified by the UCI until 1949 and the event (at the 1 kilometre distance) had not previously been held at the Olympics.

World record	Unknown	Unknown^{*}	Unknown	Unknown
Olympic record	N/A	N/A	N/A	N/A

^{*} World records were not tracked by the UCI until 1949.

Octave Dayen went first, earning a de facto Olympic record at 1:16.0. Gerard Bosch van Drakestein was the first man to beat Dayen, recording a time of 1:15.2. This held until Willy Hansen, racing 14th of 16, achieved a 1:14.4 time.

== Schedule ==
Date	Time	Round
Sunday, 5 August 1928	19:00	Final

== Results ==
The Official Report omits Rodríguez and Cattaneo, but other sources demonstrate that the two men did compete.

Rank	Cyclist	Nation	Time	Notes
1st place, gold medalist(s)	Willy Hansen	Denmark	1:14.2	OR
2nd place, silver medalist(s)	Gerard Bosch van Drakestein	Netherlands	1:15.1	
3rd place, bronze medalist(s)	Dunc Gray	Australia	1:15.3	
4	Octave Dayen	France	1:16.0	
5	Kurt Einsiedel	Germany	1:17.1	
6	Edward Kerridge	Great Britain	1:18.0	
6	Józef Lange	Poland	1:18.0	
8	Francisco Rodríguez	Argentina	1:18.4	
9	Jean Aerts	Belgium	1:18.6	
9	Angelo Cattaneo	Italy	1:18.6	
11	Lew Elder	Canada	1:19.0	
11	Bertie Donnelly	Ireland	1:19.0	
13	Erich Fäs	Switzerland	1:19.2	
14	Edmond Maillard	Chile	1:20.1	
15	Franz Dusika	Austria	1:22.0	
16	Galip Cav	Turkey	1:22.3	

== Notes ==
De Wael lists 16 competitors, with Francisco Rodríguez of Argentina placing 8th and Angelo Cattaneo of Italy tying with Aerts for 9th (with other finishers moving down correspondingly). Their names were not on the 1928 Official Report, but were discovered via research on Dutch newspapers from the time.
