= Karl Hansen =

Karl Hansen may refer to:

- Karl Aage Hansen (1921–1990), Danish footballer and Olympic bronze medalist
- Karl Hansen (footballer, born 1942), Danish footballer
- Karl Hansen (cyclist) (1902–1965), Norwegian cyclist
- Karl Hansen (equestrian) (1890–1959), Swedish horse rider
- Karl Hansen (whistleblower), whistleblower for Tesla, Inc.

== See also ==
- Carl Hansen (disambiguation)
