= John Woodcock =

John Woodcock may refer to:

== Government ==
- John Woodcock (magistrate) (born 1967), Italian prosecutor
- John Woodcock (mayor) (d. 1409), mayor of London
- John Woodcock (police officer) (1932–2012), British police officer
- John A. Woodcock Jr. (born 1950), United States federal judge
- John Woodcock, Baron Walney (born 1978), British politician

== Others ==
- John Woodcock (American football) (1954–1998), American football player
- John Woodcock (cricket writer) (1926–2021), British cricket writer and journalist
- John Woodcock (cyclist) (1903–1965), Irish cyclist
- John Woodcock (martyr) (1603–1646), English Franciscan martyr
