= Gilgen =

Gilgen is a surname. Notable people with the surname include:

- Hans Gilgen (1906–1980), Swiss cyclist
- Jamie Gilgen (born 1981), Canadian cyclist
- Philipp Gilgen (born 1976), Swiss swimmer

== See also ==
- St. Gilgen, a village in Salzburg, Austria
