= Irmer =

Irmer is a surname of German origin. It has emerged from the Old German first name Irminher (erm[en]/irm[in] = "strong", "tall" + heri = "warhost", "army"). Outside of Germany the surname is most often found among German Americans and German Brazilians.

Notable people with the surname include:

- Georg Irmer (1853–1931), German archivist, consul and historian
- Hans-Jürgen Irmer (born 1952), German politician
- Jean Carlos de Souza Irmer (born 1994), Brazilian footballer
- Karl-Heinz Irmer (1903–1975), German field hockey player
