= Westerholm =

Westerholm is a Swedish-language surname, more common in Finland than in Sweden.

== Geographical distribution ==
As of 2014, 53.5% of all known bearers of the surname Westerholm were residents of Finland (frequency 1:4,284), 25.0% of Sweden (1:16,439), 15.6% of the United States (1:963,337) and 1.0% of Estonia (1:57,464).

In Finland, the frequency of the surname was higher than national average (1:4,284) in the following regions:

1. Ostrobothnia (1:1,413)
2. Åland (1:1,794)
3. Uusimaa (1:1,928)
4. Southwest Finland (1:3,368)

In Sweden, the frequency of the surname was higher than national average (1:16,439) in the following counties:

1. Södermanland County (1:7,159)
2. Blekinge County (1:7,330)
3. Uppsala County (1:9,204)
4. Kalmar County (1:9,455)
5. Stockholm County (1:10,061)
6. Östergötland County (1:10,673)
7. Jönköping County (1:12,739)

== People ==
- Barbro Westerholm (1933–2023), Swedish politician
- Charles Westerholm (1897–1977), American cyclist
- George Westerholm, Canadian musician, singer, comedian and writer
- Raino Westerholm (1919–2017), Finnish politician
- Victor Westerholm (1860–1919), Finnish landscape painter
