= Josef Steger =

Josef Steger may refer to:

- Josef Steger (cyclist)
- Josef Steger (athlete)
- Josef Steger (politician)
