= Roberts Ozols =

Roberts Ozols may refer to:

- Roberts Ozols (cyclist) (1905–2002), Latvian cyclist
- Roberts Ozols (footballer) (born 1995), Latvian football goalkeeper
