= Carl Hansen =

Carl Hansen may refer to:

- Carl William Hansen (1872–1936), Danish author
- Carl Hansen (footballer) (1898–1978), Danish footballer
- Carl Hansen Ostenfeld (1873–1931), Danish systematic botanist
- Carl Manicus-Hansen (1877–1960), Danish gymnast
- Carl Hansen (American football) (born 1976), American football player
- Carl Hansen (Wisconsin politician) (1866–1918), American politician
- Carl Hansen (wrestler) (1887–1953), Danish wrestler
- Carl G. O. Hansen (1871–1960), Norwegian-American journalist, musician and author
- Carl W. Hansen, Danish association football referee

== See also ==
- Karl Hansen (disambiguation)
- Carl Frølich Hanssen (1883–1960), Norwegian military officer and sports executive
