= Gaioni =

Gaioni is an Italian surname. Notable people with the surname include:

- Cristina Gaioni (born 1939), Italian actress
- Giacomo Gaioni (1905–1988), Italian cyclist
