= Essing (surname) =

Essing is a surname. Notable people with the surname include:

- Arthur Essing (1905–1970), German cyclist
- Ben Essing (1935–1994), Dutch impresario

== See also ==
- De-essing
