= Józef Oksiutycz =

Polish cyclist

Personal information
- Born: 19 February 1904 Warsaw, Russian Empire
- Died: 15 July 1965 (aged 61) Warsaw, Poland

Cycling career
- Sport: Cycling

Józef Oksiutycz (19 February 1904 – 15 July 1965) was a Polish cyclist who competed in the team pursuit event at the 1928 Summer Olympics.
