= Lew Wyld =

British cyclist (1905–1974)

Lewis Wyld
Personal information
- Full name: Lewis Arthur Wyld
- Born: 15 July 1905 Tibshelf, England
- Died: 16 February 1974 (aged 68)

Cycling career
- Sport: Cycling
- Discipline: Track
- Role: Rider
Medal record
Representing Great Britain
Men's track cycling
Olympic Games
Bronze medal – third place	1928 Amsterdam	Team pursuit

Lewis Arthur Wyld (15 July 1905 – 16 February 1974) was a British track cyclist who was born in Tibshelf, Derbyshire, he won a bronze medal at the 1928 Summer Olympics.

On 5 August 1928 in Amsterdam, Lew Wyld, along with Frank Southall, Percy Wyld and Harry Wyld, broke the Team Pursuit Olympic Record in a time of 5:01.6, beating the previous record by 9.2 seconds. They were only the third team to hold the record since it first began on 10 August 1920, it was broken by 10.2 seconds the next day before standing for nearly 8 years. It is likely the record was broken in the quarter or semi-final round, as they only won a bronze medal, and as they would have proceeded to the finals had the record been broken in the qualifying rounds.
