= Cavit Cav =

Turkish cyclist

Personal information
- Born: 1905 Selanik, Ottoman Empire
- Died: 29 April 1982 (aged 76–77) Istanbul, Turkey

Cycling career
- Sport: Cycling
- Discipline: Road
- Role: Rider

July 1, 1926: Cavit Cav and his brother Galip Cav in Mecmua

Cavit Cav (1905 – 29 April 1982) was a Turkish Olympian road cyclist. He was born 1905 in Selanik, then Ottoman Empire.

Cavit Cav took up cycling, and won all the competitions he participated in. In 1924, he went to Paris, France, to represent Turkey at the Summer Olympics. However, he was not permitted to take part at the race because his bicycle did not meet the Olympic standards.

The same year, the first Istanbul Championship and Turkish National Championship were held with lessons learnt from the Olympic standards. Cavit Cav won the Istanbul Race and became Turkish champion in the individual time trial and endurance categories. He continued his success through 1932. He won also the marathon races that began first in 1925 between Istanbul and Konya and later extended to other cities. Cavit Cav wore the national jersey for the first time at the international competition with Bulgaria held 1927 in Taksim Stadium, Istanbul.

He participated at the 1928 Summer Olympics in Amsterdam, Netherlands with his brother Galip Cav in the Turkish team. In 1961, he intended to establish a bicycle manufacturing plant without success.
