= Zenons Popovs =

Latvian cyclist

Personal information
- Full name: Zenons Popovs
- Born: 28 June 1906
- Died: 1944 (aged 37–38)

Cycling career
- Sport: Cycling

Zenons Popovs (28 June 1906 – 1944) was a Latvian cyclist. He competed in the team pursuit event at the 1928 Summer Olympics.
