= Gustav Kristiansen =

Norwegian cyclist

Personal information
- Born: 31 March 1904 Oslo, Norway
- Died: 2 August 1988 (aged 84) Oslo, Norway

Cycling career
- Sport: Cycling

Gustav Kristiansen (31 March 1904 – 2 August 1988) was a Norwegian cyclist. He competed in the individual road race event at the 1928 Summer Olympics.
