= Aimé Trantoul =

French cyclist

Personal information
- Full name: André Trantoul
- Born: 13 April 1908 10th arrondissement of Paris, Paris, France
- Died: 27 February 1986 (aged 77) Neuilly-sur-Seine, France

Cycling career
- Sport: Cycling

Aimé Trantoul (13 April 1908 – 27 February 1986) was a French cyclist. He competed in the team pursuit event at the 1928 Summer Olympics.
