= Alfred Reul =

Polish cyclist

Personal information
- Born: 1 August 1909 Łódź, Russian Empire
- Died: 16 March 1980 (aged 70) Fulda, Germany

Cycling career
- Sport: Cycling

Alfred Reul (1 August 1909 – 16 March 1980) was a Polish cyclist. He competed in the team pursuit event at the 1928 Summer Olympics.
