= Jorge Gamboa =

Chilean cyclist

Jorge Gamboa Díaz
Personal information
- Full name: Jorge Gamboa
- Born: 1906 Chile
- Died: 27 December 1929 (aged 22–23)

Cycling career
- Sport: Cycling
- Discipline: Cycle sport

Jorge Gamboa (1906 – 27 December 1929) was a Chilean cyclist. He competed in the team pursuit event at the 1928 Summer Olympics.
