= Edward Kerridge =

British cyclist

Personal information
- Full name: Edward Kerridge
- Born: 23 September 1904
- Died: 1979 (aged 74–75)

Cycling career
- Sport: Cycling

Edward Kerridge (23 September 1904 – 1979) was a British cyclist. He competed in the time trial event at the 1928 Summer Olympics. Kerridge was the national champion in the 10-mile event in 1926, and finished in second place in the 5-mile event in 1928.
