= Percy Wyld =

British cyclist (1907–1972)

Personal information
- Born: 7 June 1907 Mansfield, Nottingham, England
- Died: 3 November 1972 (aged 65) Derby, England

Cycling career
- Sport: Cycling
Medal record
Representing GBR
Men's cycling
Olympic Games
Bronze medal – third place	1928 Amsterdam	Team pursuit

Percy Wyld (7 June 1907 – 3 November 1972) was a British track cyclist, born in Nottinghamshire, who won a bronze medal at the 1928 Summer Olympics.

On 5 August 1928 in Amsterdam, with Frank Southall, Harry Wyld and Lew Wyld, he broke the team pursuit Olympic record in 5:01.6, beating the previous record by 9.2 seconds. They were the third team to hold the record since it began on 10 August 1920. It was broken by 10.2 seconds the next day before standing for nearly eight years. It is likely the record was broken in the quarter or semi-final, as the team won a bronze medal; it would have proceeded to the finals had the record been broken in qualifying rounds.
