= Albert Muylle =

Belgian cyclist (born 1910)

Personal information
- Full name: Albert Muylle
- Born: 7 March 1910 Ypres, Belgium

Cycling career
- Sport: Cycling

Albert Muylle (born 7 March 1910, date of death unknown) was a Belgian cyclist. He competed in the team pursuit event at the 1928 Summer Olympics.
