= Jan Zybert =

Polish cyclist

Personal information
- Born: 11 March 1908 Łódź, Russian Empire
- Died: 1943 (aged 34–35)

Cycling career
- Sport: Cycling

Jan Zybert (11 March 1908 – 1943) was a Polish cyclist. He competed in the team pursuit event at the 1928 Summer Olympics. Drafted into the German Wehrmacht, he was allegedly killed on the Eastern Front during World War II.
