= Anton Kuys =

Dutch cyclist

Personal information
- Born: 11 August 1903 The Hague, Netherlands
- Died: 14 March 1978 (aged 74) The Hague, Netherlands

Cycling career
- Sport: Cycling

Anthonius Jacobus Kuys (11 August 1903 – 14 March 1978) was a Dutch cyclist. He competed in the individual road race at the 1928 Summer Olympics.

== See also ==
- List of Dutch Olympic cyclists
