= George Southall =

British track cyclist (1907-1993)

Montford George Southall
Personal information
- Full name: Montford George Southall
- Nickname: Monty
- Born: 17 July 1907 Wandsworth, England
- Died: 2 May 1993 (aged 85) Waveney, England
- Height: 5 ft 6 in (168 cm)

Cycling career
- Sport: Cycling
- Discipline: Track
- Role: Rider
- Rider type: Pursuitist
Medal record
Representing Great Britain
Men's Track cycling
Bronze medal – third place	1928 Amsterdam	Team pursuit

Montford George Southall (17 July 1907–2 May 1993) was a British track cyclist. He won a bronze medal at the 1928 Summer Olympics in the team pursuit event.

He was born in the Wandsworth district of London and died in Waveney, Suffolk.
