= Francisco Rodríguez (cyclist, born 1906) =

Argentine cyclist

Personal information
- Born: 1906

Cycling career
- Sport: Cycling

Francisco Rodríguez (born 1906, date of death unknown) was an Argentine cyclist. He competed in the time trial event at the 1928 Summer Olympics.
