= Marcel Pesch =

Luxembourgish cyclist

Personal information
- Born: 14 June 1910 Reims, France
- Died: 18 February 1985 (aged 74) Ixelles, Belgium

Cycling career
- Sport: Cycling

Marcel Pesch (14 June 1910 – 18 February 1985) was a Luxembourgish cyclist. He competed in the individual road race at the 1928 Summer Olympics.
