= Carlos Rocuant =

Chilean cyclist

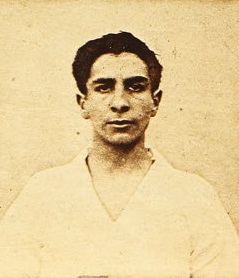

Personal information
- Full name: Carlos Rocuant
- Born: 1903
- Died: 25 October 1966 (aged 62–63)

Cycling career
- Sport: Cycling

Carlos Rocuant (1903 – 25 October 1966) was a Chilean cyclist. He competed in the team pursuit event at the 1928 Summer Olympics.
