= Poul Sørensen (cyclist) =

Danish cyclist

Personal information
- Born: 3 August 1906 Maribo, Denmark
- Died: 1 July 1951 (aged 44) Randers, Denmark

Cycling career
- Sport: Cycling

Poul Sørensen (3 August 1906 – 1 July 1951) was a Danish cyclist. He competed in the individual and team road race events at the 1928 Summer Olympics.
