= Andy Houting =

Canadian cyclist

Personal information
- Full name: Andries Nicolaas den Houting
- Born: 1 November 1901 Haarlem, Netherlands
- Died: 2 December 1975 (aged 74) Toronto, Ontario, Canada

Cycling career
- Sport: Cycling

Andries Nicolaas "Andy" den Houting (1 November 1901 – 2 December 1975) was a Canadian cyclist. He competed in the team pursuit event at the 1928 Summer Olympics.
