= Gustave Moos =

Swiss cyclist

Personal information
- Born: 1905
- Died: December 1948 (aged 42–43) Basel, Switzerland

Cycling career
- Sport: Cycling

Gustave Moos (1905 – December 1948) was a Swiss cyclist. He competed in the team pursuit event at the 1928 Summer Olympics.
