= Paul Litschi =

Swiss cyclist

Personal information
- Born: 2 January 1904 Aarau, Switzerland

Cycling career
- Sport: Cycling

Paul Litschi (born 2 January 1904, date of death unknown) was a Swiss cyclist. He competed in the individual road race at the 1928 Summer Olympics.
