= Heinrich Moos =

German fencer

Personal information
- Born: 27 March 1895 Frankfurt, German Empire
- Died: 15 June 1976 (aged 81) Frankfurt, West Germany

Sport
- Sport: Fencing

Heinrich Moos (27 March 1895 – 15 June 1976) was a German fencer. He competed in the individual and team sabre and team foil events at the 1928 Summer Olympics.
