= Jan Maas (cyclist, born 1900) =

Dutch cyclist

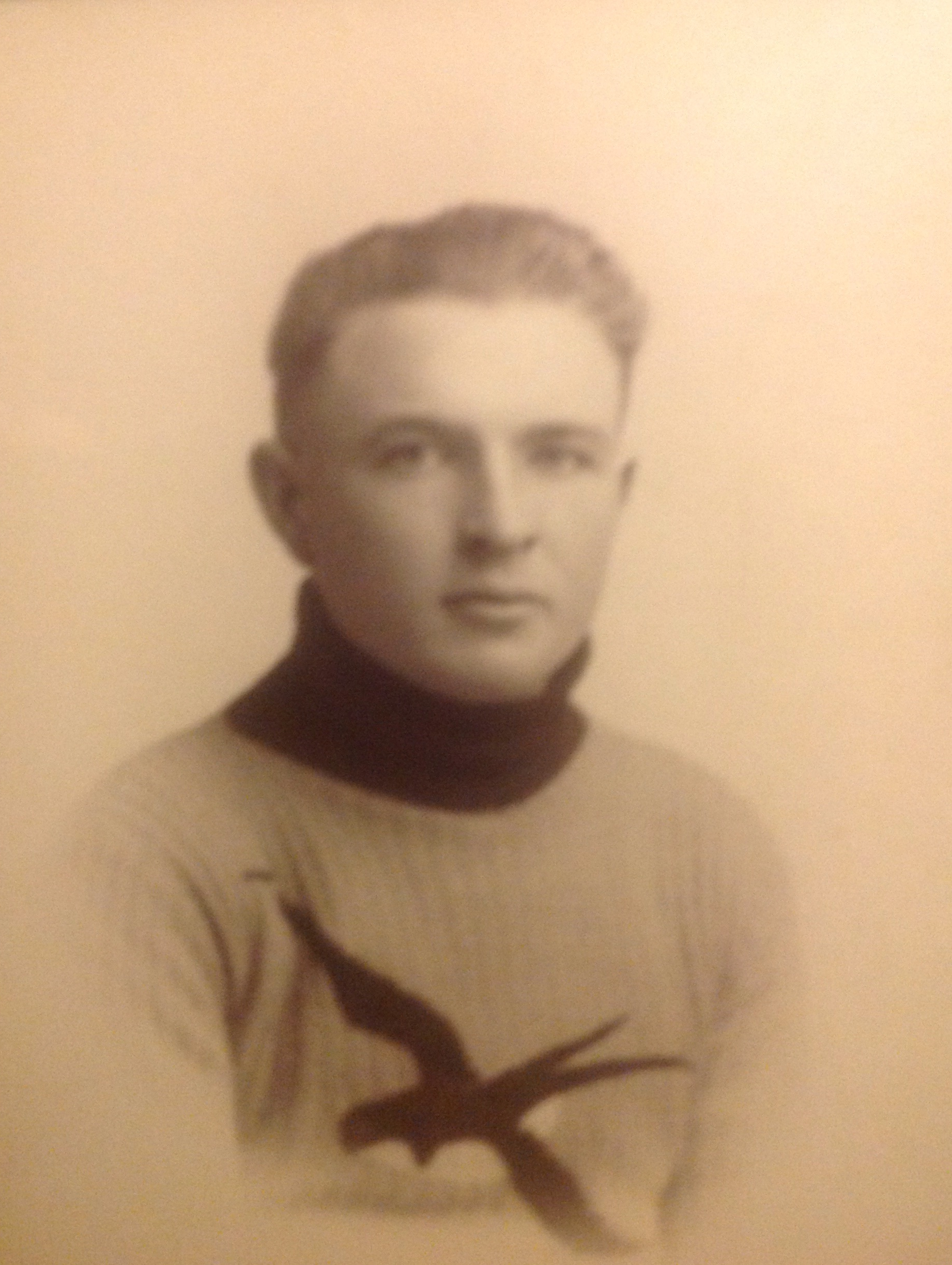

Personal information
- Born: 17 June 1900 Steenbergen, Netherlands
- Died: 5 September 1977 (aged 77) Steenbergen, Netherlands

Cycling career
- Sport: Cycling
Medal record
Representing NED
Men's cycling
Olympic Games
Silver medal – second place	1928 Amsterdam	Team pursuit

Johannes "Jan" Leonardus Maas (17 June 1900 – 5 September 1977) was a Dutch racing cyclist who competed in the 1924 Summer Olympics and in the 1928 Summer Olympics.

In 1924 he was part of the Dutch pursuit team which was eliminated in the first round of the team pursuit event. As a member of the Dutch road racing team he finished sixth in the team road race, after finishing 19th in the individual road race.

Four years later he won the silver medal as part of the Dutch pursuit team.

== See also ==
- List of Dutch Olympic cyclists
