= Carl G. O. Hansen =

Norwegian-American singer and journalist

- Born: Carl Gustav Otto Hansen; March 16, 1871; Trondheim, Norway
- Died: June 10, 1960 (aged 89); Minneapolis, Minnesota
- Occupations: journalist, musician, author
- Spouse: Amalie Marie Edsten (1892-1945)
- Children: Four

Carl G. O. Hansen (16 March 1871 – 10 June 1960) was a Norwegian-American journalist, musician and author.

== Career ==
Hansen was born the son of Sivert Christian Hansen (1839-1872) and Marit Megrund (1842-1927) in Trondheim, Norway. He immigrated to the United States with his mother and siblings in 1881. His mother, widowed since 1872, took the family to Walnut Grove, Minnesota, where her parents and siblings had previously settled. In 1882 she and her children moved to Minneapolis. Except for a short stint in Chicago, her son Carl would live in the city for the next seventy-eight years.

In his adopted hometown Hansen wrote for and edited the Dano-Norwegian newspaper Minneapolis Daglig Tidende (Minneapolis Daily Times) from 1897 until 1935. In Chicago he was similarly employed at Skandinaven newspaper between 1935 and 1937. He then edited Sons of Norway magazine in Minneapolis and served as the organization's educational director from 1939 until his retirement in 1954. A lifelong musician, Hansen sang with and directed male choruses or church choirs from the age of sixteen until impaired hearing forced him to give up the activity.

The Sons of Norway published a songbook in 1926 that provided a comprehensive collection of Norwegian songs for community singing by its membership. A valuable resource, the book enjoyed large sales before finally, in the 1940s, going out of print. The need had arisen for lyrics in both Norwegian and English. A new edition of the book, meeting this requirement, was published in 1948. The two editors, Carl G. O. Hansen and Frederick Wick, produced several of the translations themselves. Since its initial publication, the bilingual Sons of Norway songbook has gone through numerous printings and been reissued in paperback and digital formats.

In 1956 Hansen published a memoir, My Minneapolis, whose subtitle was "A chronicle of what has been learned and observed about the Norwegians in Minneapolis through one hundred years". Although the book was autobiographical, it covered topics outside of the author's personal experience. He wrote, for instance, of Ole Bull's 1856 visit to Minneapolis and of Bjørnstjerne Bjørnson's 1880-1881 Midwestern lecture tour. Upon his arrival in Minneapolis, Hansen encountered the Norwegian authors Kristofer Janson and Knut Hamsun, who lived for a time in the city, and the Norwegian-American artists Jacob Fjelde and Herbjørn Gausta. These men and many others figured in his historical narrative.

Hansen was decorated as a Knight, First Class of the Order of St. Olav in 1923 and received the St. Olav's Medal in 1939.

== "I Love Ev'ry Tune" ==
From the 1948 Sons of Norway Songbook:

Eg elskar dei voggande tonar
og all den brennande hug.
Eg elskar kvar song som ljomar,
og kvart eit barn, eit barn som lo.

Og den som med mod seg vende
mot det som var vandt å nå,
og hjarta som sorgi kjende
og endå, endå, kan soli sjå.

Eg elskar livet som strøymer
med voner i unge barm.
Eg elskar livet som gløymer
all livsens, livsens sut og harm.

— Petra Kvisli 1898
Translation:

I love ev'ry tune sweetly ringing
with yearning both eager and mild.
I love ev'ry song they are singing
and ev'ry smiling, smiling child.

The courage that's bent on pursuing
whatever is good and bold,
the heart which in grief is ruing
and still can sunshine, sunshine behold.

I love all in life that's begetting
fond hopes in the youthful mind;
I love the life when forgetting
its woes, its acts and words unkind.

— English translation: Carl G. O. Hansen

== Books ==
- History of Sons of Norway 1944
- Sons of Norway Songbook 1948
- My Minneapolis 1956

== Gallery ==
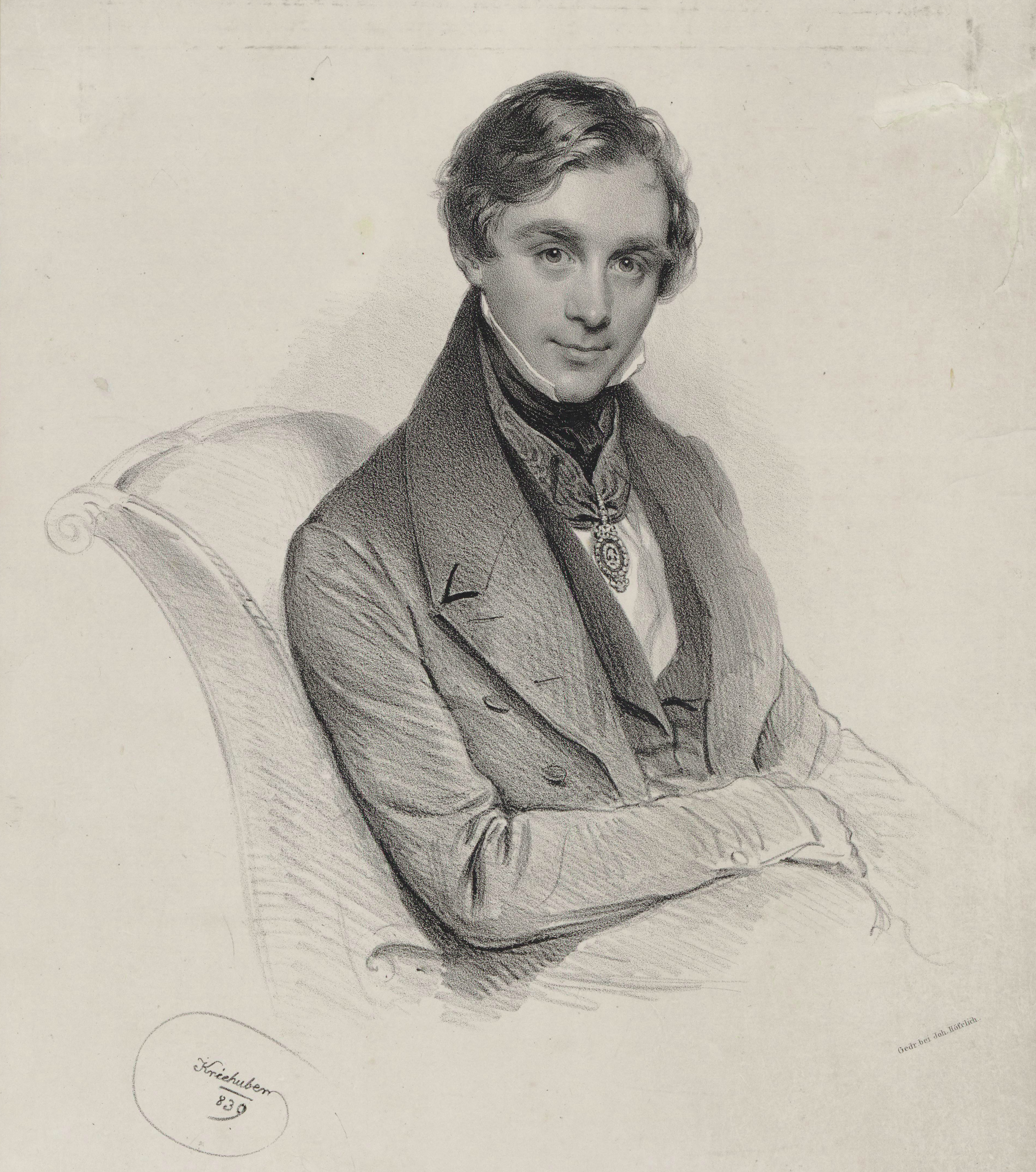
Ole Bull

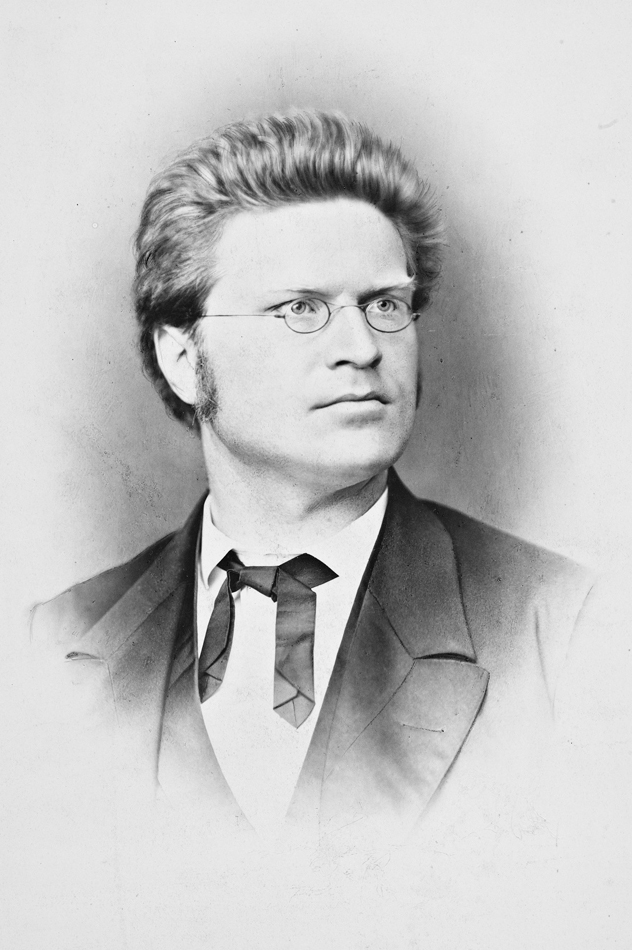
Bjørnstjerne Bjørnson

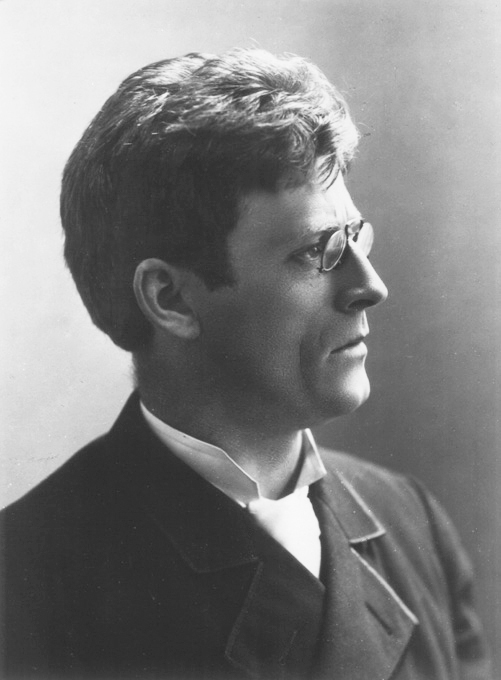
Knut Hamsun

Skandinaven headquarters
