= Hans Gilgen =

Swiss cyclist

Personal information
- Born: 16 September 1906 Rüschegg, Switzerland
- Died: 20 September 1980 (aged 74) Spiez, Switzerland

Cycling career
- Sport: Cycling
- Role: Rider

Hans Gilgen (16 September 1906 – 20 September 1980) was a Swiss racing cyclist. He competed in the team pursuit event at the 1928 Summer Olympics. He was also the Swiss National Road Race champion in 1934.
