= Helmuth Kahl =

German modern pentathlete

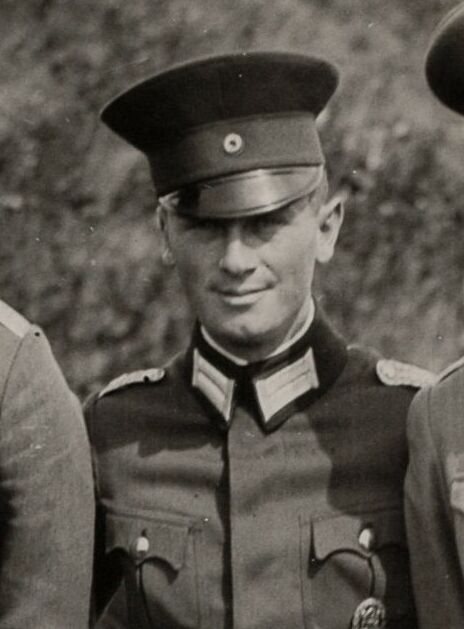
- Helmuth Kahl in 1928

Personal information
- Born: 17 February 1901 Spandau, German Empire
- Died: 23 January 1974 (aged 72) Osann-Monzel, West Germany

Sport
- Sport: Modern pentathlon
Medal record
Men's modern pentathlon
Representing Germany
Olympic Games
Bronze medal – third place	1928 Amsterdam	Individual

Helmuth Kahl (17 February 1901 – 23 January 1974) was a German modern pentathlete. He won a bronze medal at the 1928 Summer Olympics.
