= Karl Hansen (cyclist) =

Norwegian cyclist

Personal information
- Born: 30 July 1902 Trondheim, Norway
- Died: 27 August 1965 (aged 63) Trondheim, Norway

Cycling career
- Sport: Cycling

Karl Hansen (30 July 1902 – 27 August 1965) was a Norwegian cyclist. He competed in the individual road race event at the 1928 Summer Olympics.
