= Anton Joksch =

German cyclist

Personal information
- Born: 13 April 1900 Dortmund, German Empire
- Died: 27 January 1962 (aged 61) Lünen, West Germany

Cycling career
- Sport: Cycling

Anton Joksch (13 April 1900 – 27 January 1962) was a German cyclist. He competed in the team pursuit event at the 1928 Summer Olympics.
