= Erik Holm =

Swedish water polo player

Personal information
- Nationality: Swedish
- Born: 7 January 1912; Stockholm, Sweden
- Died: 28 July 1999 (aged 87); Stockholm, Sweden

Sport
- Sport: Water polo

Erik Holm (7 January 1912 – 28 July 1999) was a Swedish water polo player. He competed at the 1936 Summer Olympics, the 1948 Summer Olympics and the 1952 Summer Olympics.
