= Muhuttin Okyavuz =

Turkish fencer

Sport
- Sport: Fencing

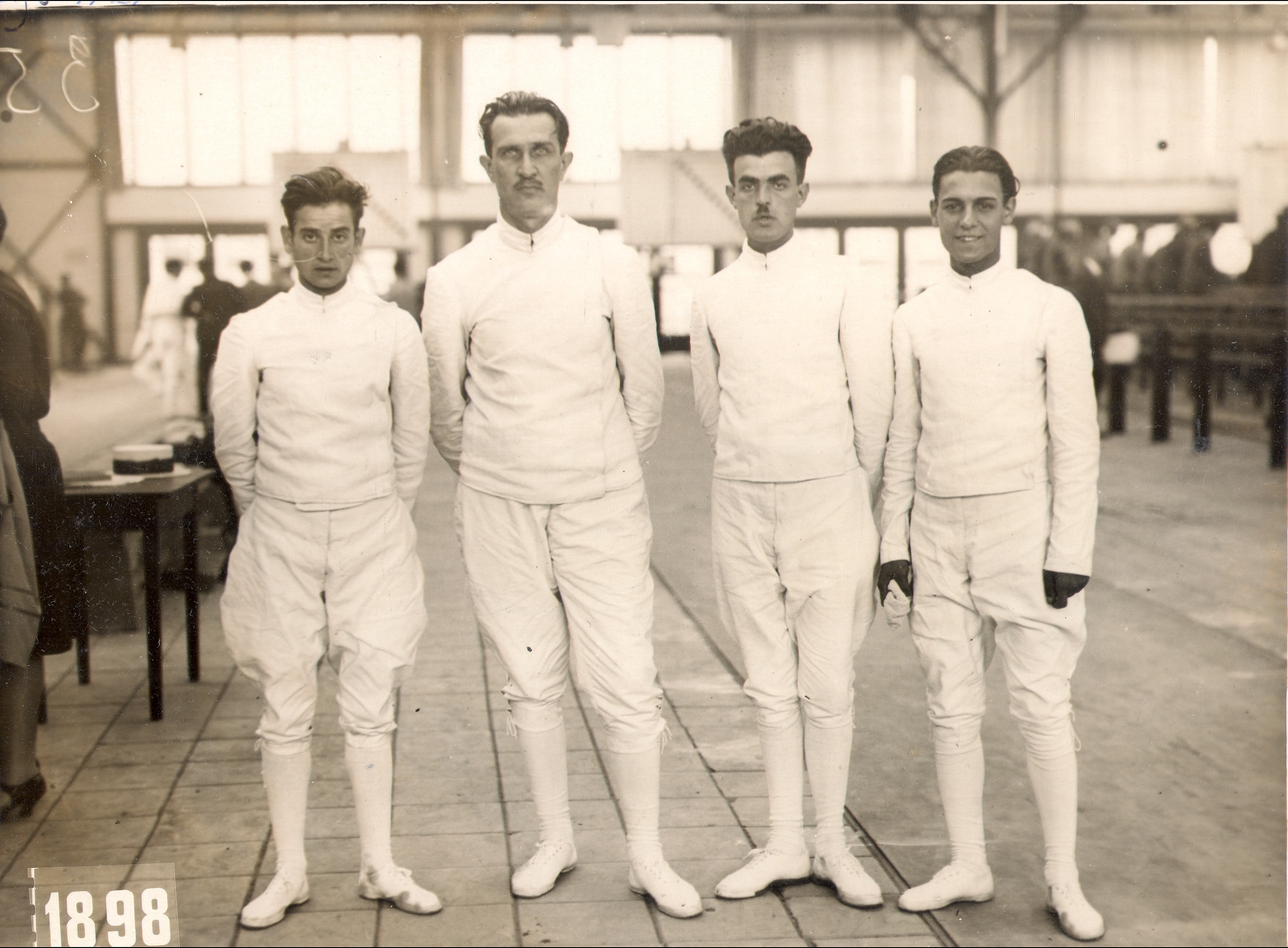
1928 Summer Olympics fencers, Turkish sabre team, including Muhuttin Okyavuz

Muhuttin Okyavuz was a Turkish fencer. He competed in the individual and team sabre events at the 1928 Summer Olympics.
