= John Woodcock (cyclist) =

Irish cyclist

Personal information
- Born: 1903
- Died: 16 January 1965 (aged 61–62)

Cycling career
- Sport: Cycling

John Patrick Woodcock (1903 – 16 January 1965) was an Irish road cyclist and Olympic competitor.

Woodcock joined the Harp Cycling Club in 1918, and dominated Irish cycling in the years 1923–33. He was the Irish record holder in the 25 miles, 50 miles and 100 kilometres road races, and represented Ireland in the 1928 Olympic Games. He took part in the cycling event at the 1928 and 1932 Tailteann Games, winning the latter to take the Queen Tailte statuette. He was one of two Irish representatives at the 1931 World Championships.

Woodcock was a founding member of the National Cycling Association in 1938, and was a life vice-president of the Harp Cycling Club. An annual race for the Jack Woodcock Memorial trophy was begun in 1966 and continued until at least 1990.

Woodcock was a member of the Old IRA. He was married with a son and three daughters.
