= Tacettin Öztürkmen =

Turkish cyclist

Personal information
- Born: 3 November 1913

Cycling career
- Sport: Cycling

Tacettin Öztürkmen (born 3 November 1913, date of death unknown) was a Turkish cyclist. He competed in the team pursuit event at the 1928 Summer Olympics.
