= Carlo Simonetti =

Italian modern pentathlete

Personal information
- Born: 23 May 1903 San Giovanni Valdarno, Italy

Sport
- Sport: Modern pentathlon

Carlo Simonetti (born 23 May 1903, date of death unknown) was an Italian modern pentathlete. He competed at the 1928 and 1932 Summer Olympics.
