= Harry Wyld =

English cyclist

Personal information
- Full name: Frederick Henry Wyld
- Born: 5 June 1900 Mansfield, England
- Died: 5 April 1976 (aged 75) Derby, England

Cycling career
- Sport: Cycling
- Discipline: Track
- Role: Rider

Amateur team
- Derby Racing Cyclists' Club
Medal record
Men's track cycling
Representing Great Britain
Olympic Games
Bronze medal – third place	1924 Paris	50 km race
Bronze medal – third place	1928 Amsterdam	Team pursuit

Frederick Henry "Harry" Wyld (born 5 June 1900, Mansfield, England, died Derby, England, 5 April 1976) was a British track cyclist. He won bronze medals at the 1924 and the 1928 Summer Olympics.

On 5 August 1928 in Amsterdam, Harry Wyld, with Frank Southall, Percy Wyld and his brother Leonard Wyld, broke the Olympic team pursuit record by 9.2 seconds, in 5:01.6. They were the third team to hold the record since it began on 10 August 1920. It was broken by 10.2 seconds next day before standing for nearly eight years. It is likely the record was broken in the quarter or semi-final as they won a bronze medal; they would have proceeded to the final had the record been broken in qualifying rounds.
