= Nami Yayak =

Turkish fencer

Sport
- Sport: Fencing

Nami Yayak was a Turkish fencer. He competed in the individual and team sabre events at the 1928 Summer Olympics.
