= Ambrogio Beretta =

Italian cyclist

Personal information
- Born: 3 March 1905 Saronno, Italy
- Died: 14 February 1988 (aged 82) Rivoli, Italy

Cycling career
- Sport: Cycling

Ambrogio Beretta (3 March 1905 – 14 February 1988) was an Italian cyclist. He competed in the individual and team road race events at the 1928 Summer Olympics.
