= Ömer Besim Koşalay =

Turkish middle-distance runner

Personal information
- Nationality: Turkish
- Born: 10 February 1898 Istanbul, Turkey
- Died: 11 November 1956 (aged 58)

Sport
- Sport: Middle-distance running
- Event: 800 metres

Ömer Besim Koşalay (10 February 1898 – 11 November 1956) was a Turkish middle-distance runner. He competed in the 800 metres at the 1924 Summer Olympics and the 1928 Summer Olympics.
