= Franco Reyser =

Italian sprinter (1904–2003)

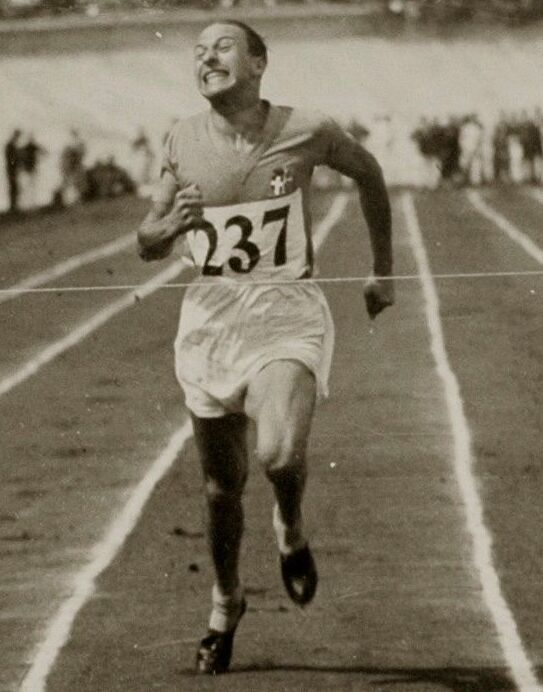
- Franco Reyser in 1928

Personal information
- Full name: Franco Gilberto Reyser
- Nationality: Italian
- Born: 14 March 1904 London, England
- Died: 25 July 2003 (aged 99) Paderno Dugnano, Italy

Sport
- Sport: Sprinting
- Event: 100 metres

Franco Reyser (also spelled Reiser) (14 March 1904 – 25 July 2003) was an Italian sprinter. He competed in the men's 100 metres at the 1928 Summer Olympics.
