= Charles Westerholm =

American cyclist

Personal information
- Born: December 27, 1897 Uusimaa, Finland
- Died: September 2, 1977 (aged 79) Bronx, New York, United States

Cycling career
- Sport: Cycling

Charles Westerholm (December 27, 1897 – September 2, 1977) was an American cyclist. He competed in the individual road race at the 1928 Summer Olympics. Born in Kirkkonummi, Finland, Westerholm moved to the United States when he was young and became a US citizen in 1918.
