= Bernhard Stübecke =

German cyclist

Personal information
- Born: 6 May 1904 Hemer, German Empire
- Died: 2 August 1964 (aged 60) Iserlohn, West Germany

Cycling career
- Sport: Cycling

Bernhard Stübecke (6 May 1904 – 2 August 1964) was a German cyclist. He competed in the individual road race at the 1928 Summer Olympics.
