= Kamalendumati Shah =

Indian politician

- Born: Tehri Garhwal district, Uttarakhand, India
- Died: 15 July 1999
- Occupations: Politician; Social worker
- Known for: Parliamentary politics Social activism
- Awards: Padma Bhushan

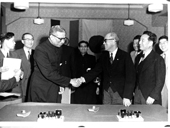
K. K. Chettur shaking hands with Katsuo Okazaki - signing the Indo-Japanese Treaty of Peace in Tokyo ((L. to R.) T. Subrahmanyam, K. Raghuramaiah, Nardeo Snatak, K. C. Sharma, Rajendra Prasad, Kamalendu Mati Shah, R. S. Rao, Atma Singh Namdhari and K. N. Desai)

Kamalendumati Shah (died 1999) was an Indian politician, social worker and a member of Indian Parliament. Hailing from the Tehri Garhwal district of the present day Uttarakhand, she was known to have been active in parliamentary politics. The Government of India awarded her the third highest civilian honour of the Padma Bhushan, in 1958, for her contributions to society. She died on 15 July 1999 succumbing to brain cancer.
