= Frank Southall =

English racing cyclist (1904-1964)

Personal information
- Full name: William Frank Southall
- Born: 2 July 1904 Wandsworth, England
- Died: 1 March 1964 (aged 59)

Cycling career
- Sport: Cycling
- Discipline: Road
- Role: Rider

Amateur team
- Norwood Paragon CC

Professional team
- 1934: Individual

Managerial team
- Hercules
Medal record
Men's road bicycle racing
Representing Great Britain
Olympic Games
Silver medal – second place	1928 Amsterdam	Individual road race
Silver medal – second place	1928 Amsterdam	Team road race
Bronze medal – third place	1932 Los Angeles	Team pursuit

William Frank Southall (2 July 1904 – 1 March 1964) was an English racing cyclist who won silver medals for Great Britain in the individual road race (run as an individual time trial) at the 1928 Summer Olympics and a track cycling medal at the 1932 Summer Olympics in Los Angeles. He also represented Britain in world championships from 1926 to 1933.

He was born in Wandsworth, London. He rode for the South London Norwood Paragon cycling club, broke numerous time trial and Road Records Association place-to-place records in domestic competitions, winning the first four British Best All-Rounder (BBAR) competitions from 1930 to 1933.

== Records ==
He broke his first record on Easter Monday in 1925, when he won the Etna 50-mile (80 km) time trial on the Bath Road course in 2h 8m 31s, beating the record by five minutes. He followed this by breaking the one-hour record at Herne Hill Velodrome on 26 May by almost 1400 yards to record 25 miles 1520 yards.

He then improved the 50-mile record in the same event the following year and broke the world amateur hour record with 26 miles and 838 yards at Herne Hill in June 1926. Southall was selected by the National Cyclists' Union to represent Britain at the 1926 UCI Road World Championships, where he finished in eighth place.

In 1927, Southall again broke the 50-mile (80 km) record in the Etna event, recording 2h 5m 7s. On 24 July, he broke the RRA London-Brighton and back record by 13 minutes, with 4h 53m 20s.

On 5 August 1928 in Amsterdam, with Harry Wyld, Percy Wyld and Leonard Wyld, he broke the team pursuit Olympic record in 5:01.6, beating the previous record by 9.2 seconds. They were only the third team to hold the record since it began on 10 August 1920. It was broken by 10.2 seconds next day before standing for nearly eight years.

In 1930, Southall finished seventh in the world road race championship (an individual time trial in Denmark) and broke the national 100-mile (160 km) time trial record with 4h 32m 46s.

In 1933, Southall and Stan Butler rode the Oak Tandem 100, winning in 4h 1m 3s, beating the record by two minutes. Southall now held six single and tandem competition records (25, 50 and 100 miles (160 km) single and 30, 50 and 100 miles (160 km) tandem).

== Olympic controversy ==
The Olympic road race in Amsterdam in 1928 was run against the clock, as an individual time-trial. It was the last to be disputed that way. Southall was one of the best performers in the world against the clock but in 21 miles (34 km) he lost seven minutes to Henry Hansen of Denmark.

Bill Mills of the News Chronicle wrote:

The British team sent over for the 1928 Games at Amsterdam was probably the best that ever left our shores. It included the great Frank Southall, unbeatable in time-trials on the road... Our best chance was in the road race, a 165km (102 1/2 miles) time-trial, and a sensation was caused when Southall was beaten into second place by the Dane, Harry Hansen, who took 4h 47m 17s against Southall's 4h 55m 6s. British officials lodged a protest, alleging that Hansen had not covered the full course, but it was proved that he had and the result stood.

British officials protested that Southall had been 90 seconds behind Hansen at 50 km but that 34 km later the lead had stretched to eight and a half minutes. They insisted that Hansen had neither gone faster nor Southall slower. Southall had been riding fast enough to take back a minute in the last half of the race. They suggested that the Dane had taken a short cut.

The judges turned down the protest and Hansen received the gold medal.

What happened remains a mystery. Southall and the officials believed they had been cheated. But another member of the team, Jack Lauterwasser did not believe it then and never changed his mind. "I couldn't see where anything like that could have happened. It seemed to me that it would have been impossible to go off-course", he said.

Southall finished sixth in the Olympic road race in 1932, with Charles Holland 15th and Stan Butler 16th. The Great Britain team finished fourth overall. In the team pursuit, Britain, with Southall, beat Canada to take bronze.

== Golden Book of Cycling ==
After winning his first BBAR Southall's achievements were celebrated in 1932 when Cycling Weekly awarded him his own page in the Golden Book of Cycling.

== Professional ==
He turned professional in 1934 to attack place-to-place records, there being no professional road racing in Britain. He broke nine records in two years.

In 1935, a team of Australian cyclists, including Hubert Opperman 'Hefty' Stuart and Ern Milliken traveled to England to attack various distance records. Opperman rode 466 miles in 24 hours to break Southall's record of 457 miles. Southall's record for London-Portsmouth-London of 6hr 49' 17" was beaten by Stuart setting a new record of 6hrs 34' 7". Southall's record for London-Brighton-London of 4hr 59' 23" was twice beaten by Milliken setting a new record of 4hr 39' 26". Southall responded with four unsuccessful attempts to regain the London-Brighton-London record before he succeeded in a time of 4h 38' 27".

Later, he managed the professional careers of Ken Joy and Eileen Sheridan and became manager of the Hercules professional road-race team. He had already worked for Hercules as a salesman. He was elected president of Norwood Paragon in 1953.

He died aged 59 on 1 March 1964 in Hayling Island, Hampshire.

== Assessment ==
The weekly paper, The Bicycle, said of him:

The versatility of the great Norwood Paragonian, Frank Southall, thrilled the cycling world of the 1920s and 1930s. No matter what branch of the sport he turned to, road time trials, paced races on the track, road records or track records, he dominated his contemporaries. In addition to his speed, he had the personality that attracts the crowd, and any track meeting billing 'F.W.S.' versus, say, Harry Wyld (his great rival at the paced game) was certain of a packed house. Although he raced on almost every road course in this country, and competed in many events abroad... world's championships and Olympic Games... he was always at his best on his 'home ground', the Brighton Road, and his RRA record for the London to Brighton and back which he set up in 1935 (he covered the 104 hilly miles in 4h 38m 27s) still stands.
