= Reinholdt Christensen =

Danish footballer

Personal information
- Full name: Reinholdt Karsten Friis Christensen
- Date of birth: 3 March 1916
- Place of birth: Copenhagen, Denmark
- Date of death: 23 July 1999 (aged 83)
- Position: Forward

International career
Years	Team	Apps	(Gls)
1938	Denmark	1	(1)

Reinholdt Christensen (3 March 1916 – 23 July 1999) was a Danish footballer. He played in one match for the Denmark national football team in 1938.
