= Jack Lauterwasser =

English racing cyclist & cycling engineer (1904-2003)

Personal information
- Full name: John Jacob Lauterwasser
- Nickname: Jack
- Born: 4 June 1904 London, England
- Died: 2 February 2003 (aged 98) Somerset, England

Cycling career
- Sport: Cycling
- Disciplines: Road & Track
- Role: Rider

Amateur team
- 1924: Finsbury Park cycling club

Major wins
- 1928 - Road Records Association 50-mile record, 1hr 54m 47s. He also punctured and lost 3mins. First rider to beat 50 mile paced record. 1928 - Summer Olympics - 160km road race, Silver medal 1928 - Road Records Association 100-mile record, 4h 13m 35s 1928 - Polytechnic CC “Gayler” trophy 12-hour race, covered 240 miles 76 yards. the first rider to exceed 20 mph
Medal record
Representing Great Britain
Men's road bicycle racing
Olympic Games
Silver medal – second place	1928 Amsterdam	Team road race

John Jacob Lauterwasser (4 June 1904 – 2 February 2003) was an English racing cyclist and cycling engineer, who won a bronze and silver medal in the same race at the 1928 Summer Olympics in Amsterdam.

== Background ==
Jack Lauterwasser - he pronounced it Law-tuh-woss-uh with the "w" as in English - was the son of a German who emigrated to France in the late 19th century and then to England. His parents ran a pie shop near Oxford Street, London, where they lived in poor housing. His father was returned to Germany at the outbreak of war in 1914 and Lauterwasser lived with his mother and the rest of her children. They moved to Highbury in north London and Lauterwasser worked as a cycling delivery boy for a grocery store.

He said: "We lived above a greengrocer's and the shopkeeper let me borrow the bike."

== Early cycling ==
Lauterwasser joined Finsbury Park cycling club in 1924 and won his first race, his club's 25-mile time trial for novices, when he was 13. He began riding longer races, including time-trials that lasted 12 hours. "I really was a novice, a greenhorn who knew nothing, but in my first season I progressed to being club champ and winning some good time-trials," he said. He broke the Road Records Association 50-mile record in 1928.(ref RRA General Secretary)

== Olympic Games ==
Lauterwasser was picked for the 1928 Olympic Games in Amsterdam and cycled there from London. He won a silver medal in the 160 km road race event at the Amsterdam Olympics. The race was run against the clock as an individual time trial, a British speciality, with riders starting at two-minute intervals. Lauterwasser finished fifth in 5h 2m 57s. He and his team-mates, Frank Southall (second) and John Middleton (26th), were originally judged third best team but were raised to second after Italy was disqualified. Lauterwasser had already returned home with his bronze medal. He was then sent the silver medal as well and was never asked to return the bronze, he said. It took him a further two years to get the silver medal from his club; "Our club secretary's wife considered it belonged to the club," he said. He kept both medals in a biscuit tin.

== Other cycling ==
In the same year as the Olympics, Lauterwasser broke the Road Records Association 50-mile record by almost three minutes with lhr 54m 47s and the 100-mile record by more than 18 minutes, in 4hr 13m 35s. He won the Polytechnic CC 12-hour race with a record 237.8 miles. Lauterwasser and others believed he had ridden further, that he had been first to cover 240 miles. Seven years later the course was remeasured and Lauterwasser was credited with 240 miles 76 yards, making his total distance 240 miles 76 yds, the first rider to exceed 20 mph.(ref Finsbury Park CC archives)

== Retirement ==
Lauterwasser opened a cycle shop in Holloway Road, London, in 1929. He built lightweight bicycles to order and created a design of handlebar named after him.

"I fill a standard pair of bars with sand and then bend them to the style I want," he said.

His lightest Lauterweight bicycle weighed 17.5 lb. The business was not a success, however.

Those were great times, especially in the immediate postwar years, but then, at the dawn of the Sixties, the bubble burst. The advent of the motor scooter, the moped and the cheap car spelt the end of cycling's popularity with commuters and the sport took a major dip, too.

The shop closed and he joined Rudge. He moved to BSA during the Second World War and made folding bicycles for parachutists. He moved to Raleigh when peace returned and worked as a sales rep in the 1950s and early 1960s. In 1965 he joined Alex Moulton at Bradford-on-Avon, making bicycles with suspension. He continued working until he was 90. He died after a fall at home where he broke his leg.
