= Şinasi Şahingiray =

Turkish sprinter

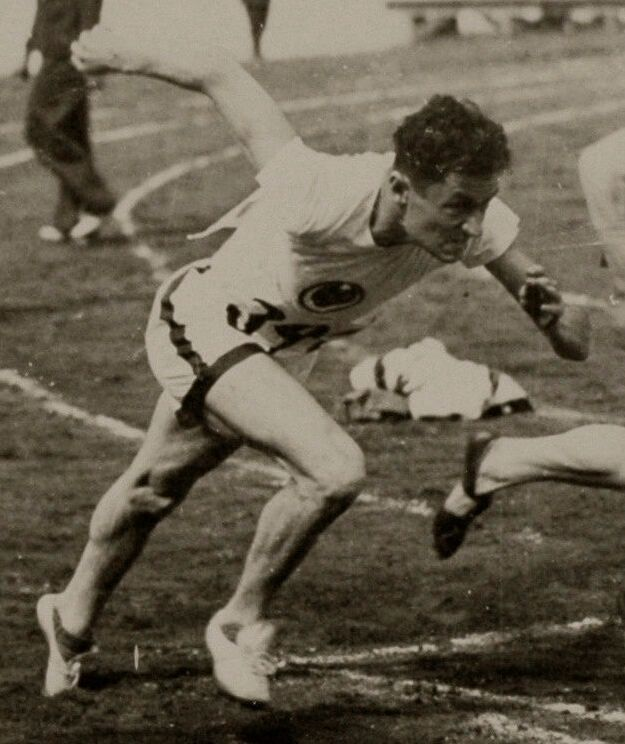
- Şinasi Şahingiray in 1928

Personal information
- Nationality: Turkish
- Born: July 31, 1905
- Died: 1983 (aged 77–78)

Sport
- Sport: Sprinting
- Event: 100 metres

Şinasi Şahingiray (31 July 1905 - 1983) was a Turkish sprinter. He competed in the men's 100 metres at the 1928 Summer Olympics. He was twenty-two years old when he competed, and ranked fourth in the 100 Metre Dash. His personal best time for the 100 Metre Dash was 11.4 seconds.
