= Piet van der Horst =

Dutch cyclist (1903–1983)

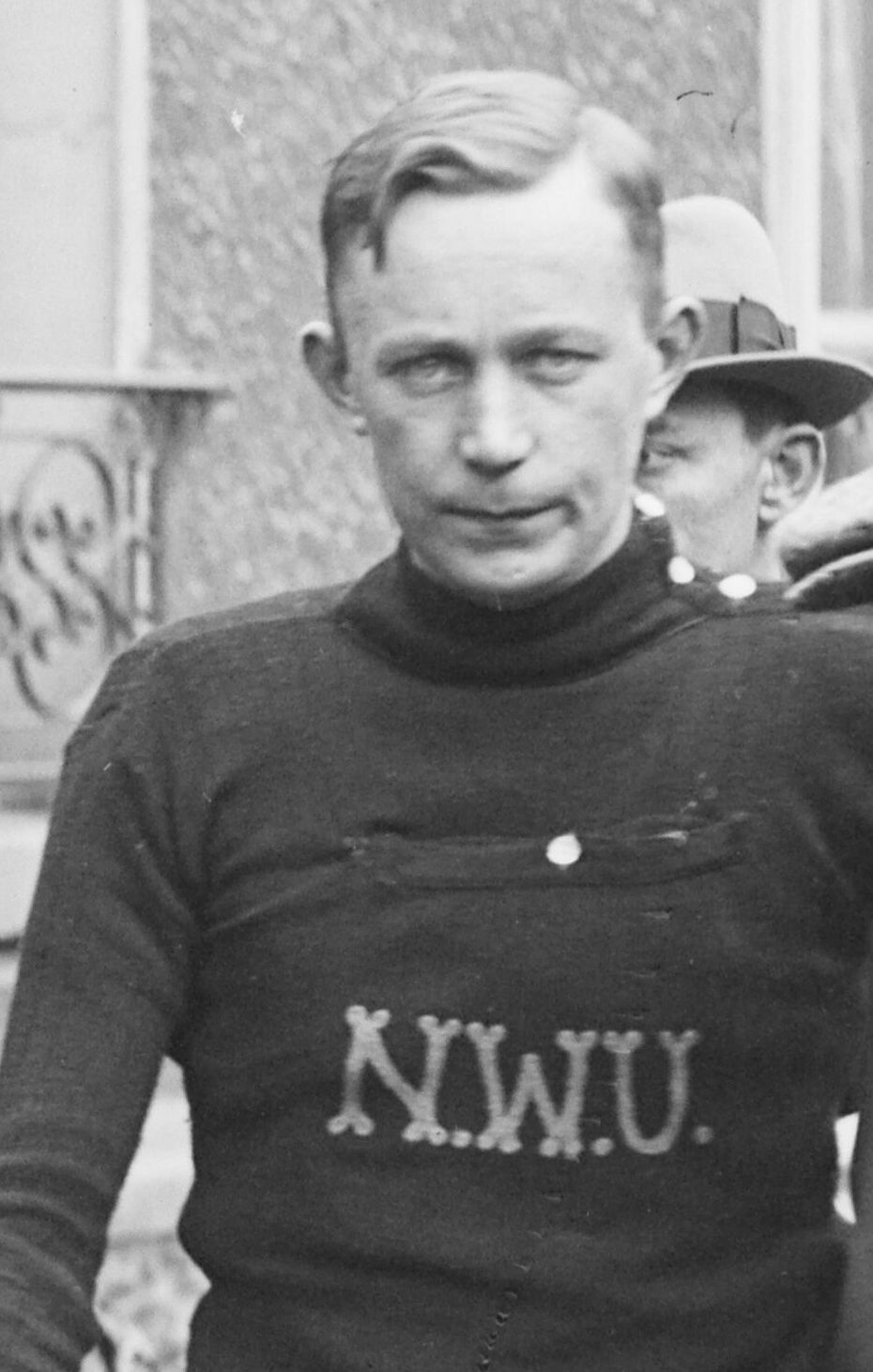
- Piet van der Horst in 1932

Personal information
- Born: 25 October 1903 Klundert, Netherlands
- Died: 18 February 1983 (aged 79) Breda, Netherlands

Cycling career
- Sport: Cycling
Medal record
Representing NED
Men's cycling
Olympic Games
Silver medal – second place	1928 Amsterdam	Team pursuit

Petrus "Piet" Michaelis van der Horst (25 October 1903 – 18 February 1983) was a Dutch racing cyclist who competed in the 1928 Summer Olympics. He won the silver medal as part of the Dutch pursuit team.

== See also ==
- List of Dutch Olympic cyclists
