= Angelo Cattaneo =

Italian cyclist

Personal information
- Born: 13 June 1901 Milan, Italy
- Died: 29 November 1985 (aged 84) Vailate, Italy

Cycling career
- Sport: Cycling

Angelo Cattaneo (13 June 1901 – 29 November 1985) was an Italian cyclist. He competed in the time trial event at the 1928 Summer Olympics.
