= Camillo Zemi =

Italian athlete (1898–1959)

Personal information
- Nationality: Italian
- Born: 22 January 1898 Pavia, Kingdom of Italy
- Died: 10 August 1959 (aged 61)

Sport
- Country: Italy
- Sport: Athletics
- Event(s): Discus throw Hammer throw

Camillo Zemi (22 January 1898 – 10 August 1959) was an Italian discus thrower and hammer thrower who competed at the 1924 Summer Olympics, and at the 1928 Summer Olympics.

== National titles ==
He won four times the national championships at individual senior level.

- Italian Athletics Championships
  - Discus throw: 1927, 1929 (2)
  - Hammer throw: 1924, 1925 (2)
