= Enver Balkan =

Turkish fencer (1902–1966)

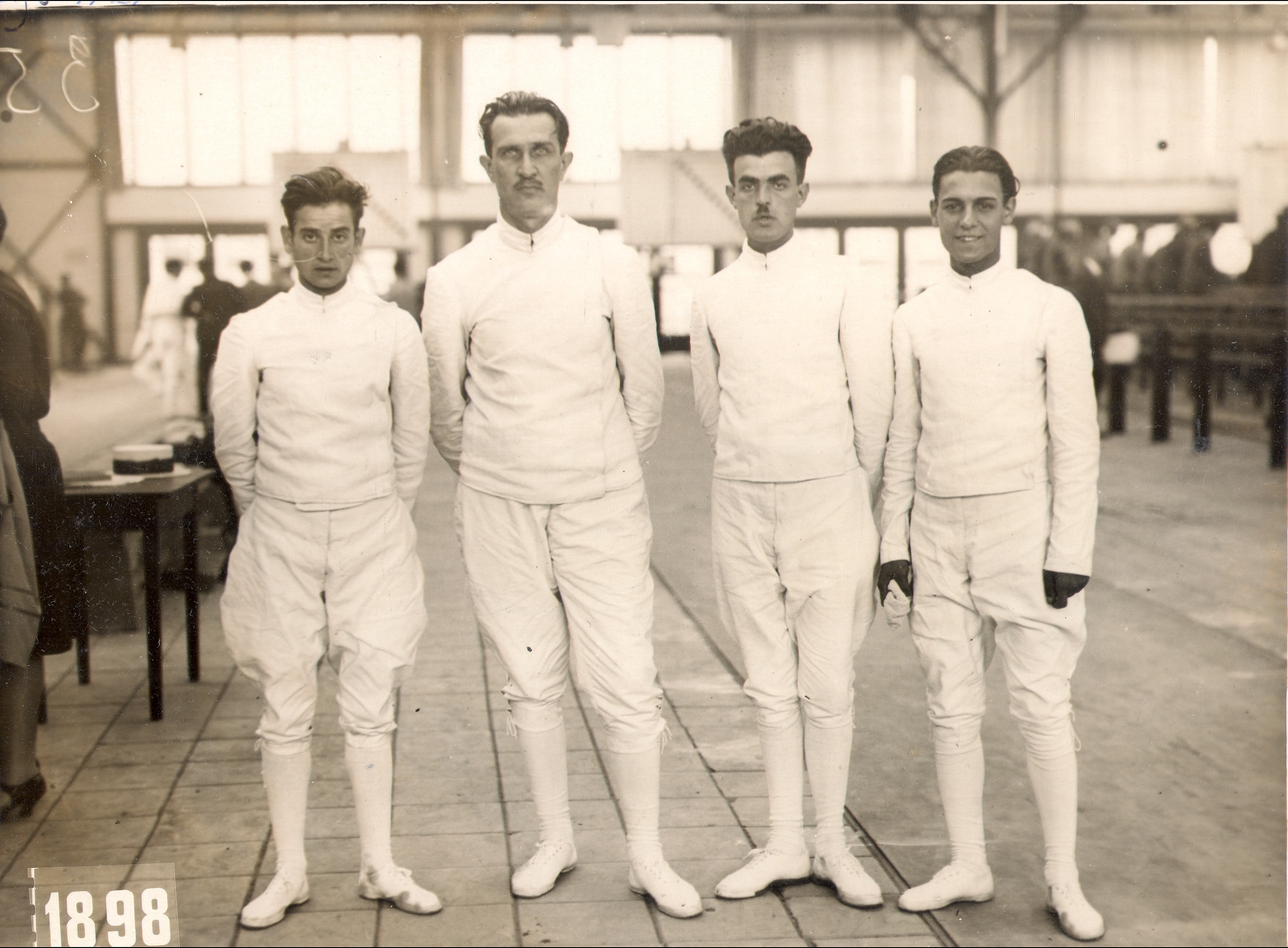
- Turkish fencers of the 1928 Summer Olympics

Personal information
- Nationality: Turkish
- Born: 5 March 1902 Constantinople, Ottoman Empire
- Died: 1966 (aged 63–64) Istanbul, Turkey

Sport
- Sport: Fencing

Enver Balkan (5 March 1902 – 1966) was a Turkish fencer. He competed in the individual and team sabre events at the 1928 and 1936 Summer Olympics.
