= Hans Dormbach =

German cyclist

Personal information
- Born: 4 June 1908 Cologne, Germany

Cycling career
- Sport: Cycling

Hans Dormbach (born 4 June 1908, date of death unknown) was a German cyclist. He competed in the team pursuit event at the 1928 Summer Olympics.
