= Semih Türkdoğan =

Turkish sprinter

Personal information
- Nationality: Turkish
- Born: 1912
- Died: 16 May 1994 (aged 81–82)

Sport
- Sport: Sprinting
- Event: 100 metres

Semih Türkdoğan (1912 – 16 May 1994) was a Turkish sprinter. He competed in the men's 100 metres at the 1928 Summer Olympics.
