= Roberts Ozols (cyclist) =

Latvian cyclist

Personal information
- Full name: Roberts Ozols
- Born: 8 November 1905
- Died: 27 May 2002 (aged 96)

Cycling career
- Sport: Cycling

Roberts Ozols (8 November 1905 – 27 May 2002) was a Latvian cyclist. He competed in the team pursuit event at the 1928 Summer Olympics.
