= Luigi Petrillo =

Italian modern pentathlete (1903–1969)

Personal information
- Born: 18 March 1903 Villa San Giovanni, Italy
- Died: 18 March 1969 (aged 66) Rome, Italy

Sport
- Sport: Modern pentathlon

Luigi Petrillo (18 March 1903 – 18 March 1969) was an Italian modern pentathlete. He competed at the 1928 Summer Olympics.
