= Janus Braspennincx =

Dutch cyclist (1903–1977)

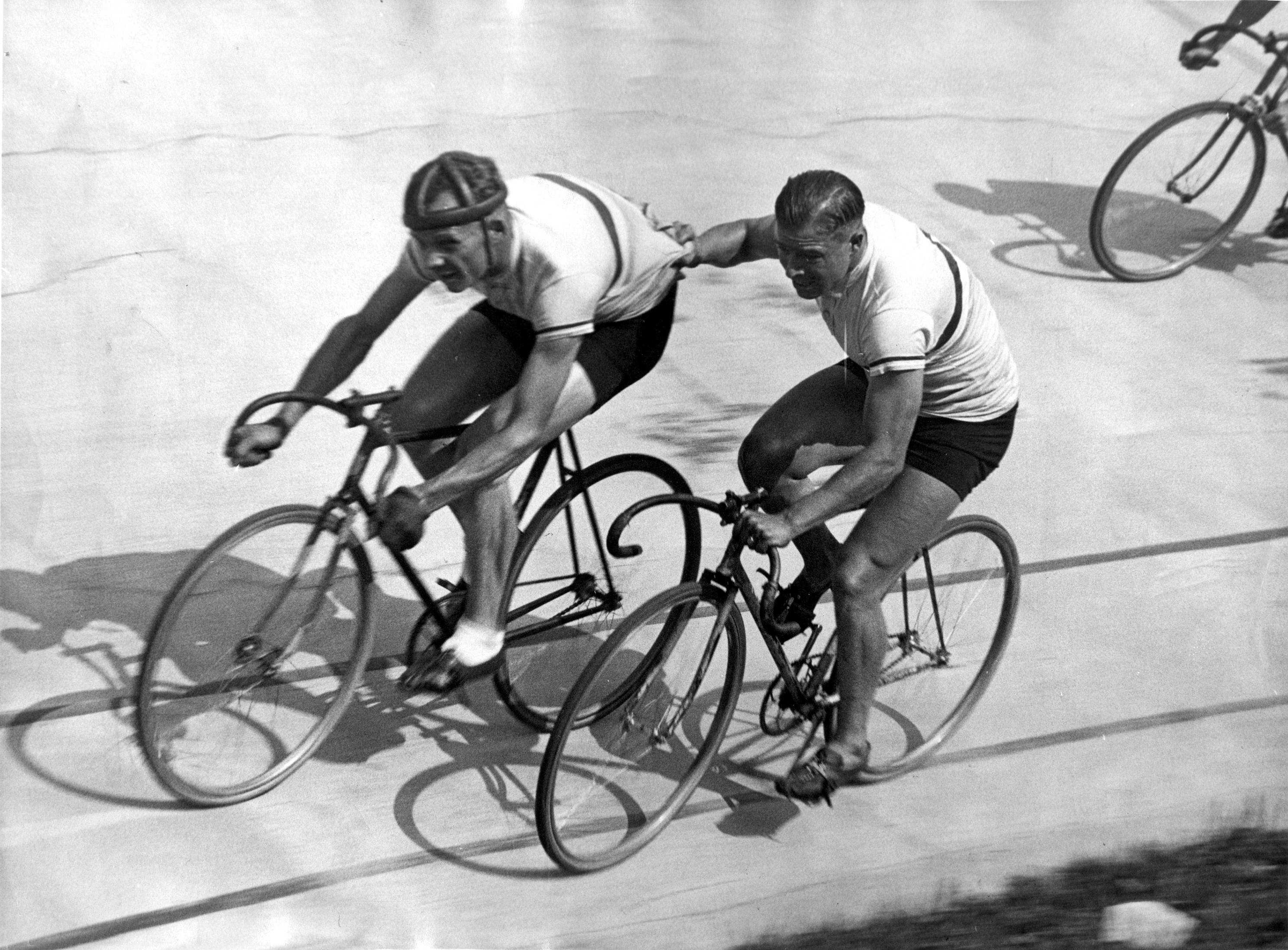
- Janus Braspennincx (left) with Jan Pijnenburg

Personal information
- Born: 5 March 1903 Zundert, Netherlands
- Died: 7 January 1977 (aged 73) Breda, Netherlands

Cycling career
- Sport: Cycling
Medal record
Representing Netherlands
Men's cycling
Olympic Games
Silver medal – second place	1928 Amsterdam	Team pursuit

Adrianus Jacobus "Janus" Braspennincx (5 March 1903 in Zundert – 7 January 1977 in Breda) was a Dutch racing cyclist who competed in the 1928 Summer Olympics.

In the 1928 Summer Olympics, he won a silver medal as part of the Dutch pursuit team. He finished ninth in the team road race as a member of the Dutch road racing team, after finishing 27th in the individual road race.

== See also ==
- List of Dutch Olympic cyclists
