= Kurt Einsiedel =

German cyclist

Personal information
- Born: 12 February 1907 Altenburg, Germany
- Died: 25 March 1960 (aged 53)

Cycling career
- Sport: Cycling

Kurt Einsiedel (12 February 1907 – 25 March 1960) was a German cyclist. He competed in the team pursuit and time trial events at the 1928 Summer Olympics.
