= Karl Koch (cyclist) =

German cyclist

Personal information
- Born: 30 June 1910 Alsfeld, Germany
- Died: 28 June 1944 (aged 33) Normandy, France

Cycling career
- Sport: Cycling

Karl Koch (30 June 1910 – 28 June 1944) was a German cyclist. He competed in the individual road race event at the 1928 Summer Olympics. He was killed in action during World War II.
