= Arthur Essing =

German cyclist

Personal information
- Born: 15 February 1905 Essen, German Empire
- Died: 28 February 1970 (aged 65) Munich, West Germany

Cycling career
- Sport: Cycling

Arthur Essing (15 February 1905 – 28 February 1970) was a German cyclist. He competed in the individual road race at the 1928 Summer Olympics.
