= Jan Pijnenburg =

Dutch cyclist (1906–1979)

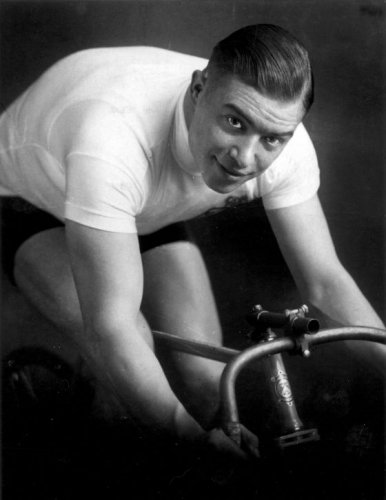
- Pijnenburg c. 1930

Personal information
- Full name: Johannes Baptist Nobertus Pijnenburg
- Born: 15 February 1906 Tilburg, Netherlands
- Died: 2 December 1979 (aged 73) Tilburg, Netherlands

Cycling career
- Sport: Cycling
Medal record
Men's cycling
Representing Netherlands
Olympic Games
Silver medal – second place	1928 Amsterdam	Team pursuit

Johannes "Jan" Baptist Norbertus Pijnenburg (15 February 1906 – 2 December 1979) was a Dutch track cyclist who competed in the 1928 Summer Olympics. He won the silver medal as part of the Dutch pursuit team. After the Olympics he turned professional and won six-day races in Dortmund (1931, 1932), Berlin (1931), Amsterdam (1932, 1933), Brussels (1932–1934), Paris (1932, 1934), Chicago (1932), Frankfurt (1933), Stuttgart (1933), Antwerp (1934, 1937), Rotterdam (1936) and Copenhagen (1936).

Honored by several people, he retired in September 1940.

== See also ==
- List of Dutch Olympic cyclists
