= Karl-Heinz Irmer =

German field hockey player

Olympic medal record

Men's field hockey
Bronze medal – third place	1928 Amsterdam	Team competition

Karl-Heinz Irmer (22 July 1903 – 8 November 1975) was a German field hockey player who competed in the 1928 Summer Olympics.

He was a member of the German field hockey team, which won the bronze medal. He played two matches as halfback.
