= Mario Lusiani =

Italian cyclist (1903–1964)

Personal information
- Born: 4 May 1903 Vescovana, Italy
- Died: 3 September 1964 (aged 61)

Cycling career
- Sport: Cycling
Medal record
Representing ITA
Men's cycling
Olympic Games
Gold medal – first place	1928 Amsterdam	Team pursuit

Mario Lusiani (4 May 1903 – 3 September 1964) was an Italian cyclist. He won the gold medal in Men's team pursuit at the 1928 Summer Olympics along with Giacomo Gaioni, Cesare Facciani and Luigi Tasselli.
