= Yunus Nüzhet Unat =

Turkish cyclist (1913–1999)

Personal information
- Born: 4 August 1913
- Died: 27 July 1999 (aged 85) Drama, Greece

Cycling career
- Sport: Cycling

Yunus Nüzhet Unat (4 August 1913 – 27 July 1999) was a Turkish cyclist. He competed in the team pursuit event at the 1928 Summer Olympics.
