= Josef Steger (cyclist) =

German cyclist

Personal information
- Born: 19 March 1904 Oberhausen, German Empire
- Died: 19 December 1964 (aged 60) Singen, West Germany

Cycling career
- Sport: Cycling

Josef Steger (19 March 1904 – 19 December 1964) was a German cyclist. He competed in the team pursuit event at the 1928 Summer Olympics.
