= Cesare Facciani =

Italian cyclist

Personal information
- Born: 21 February 1906 Turin, Italy
- Died: 29 August 1938 (aged 32) Turin, Italy

Cycling career
- Sport: Cycling
Medal record
Representing ITA
Men's cycling
Olympic Games
Gold medal – first place	1928 Amsterdam	Team pursuit

Cesare Facciani (21 February 1906 – 29 August 1938) was an Italian cyclist. He won the gold medal in Men's team pursuit in the 1928 Summer Olympics along with Giacomo Gaioni, Mario Lusiani and Luigi Tasselli. He was forced to retire in 1934 due to an illness that led to his death in 1938.
