= Luigi Tasselli =

Italian cyclist (1901–1971)

Personal information
- Born: 20 October 1901 Virgilio, Lombardy, Italy
- Died: 5 November 1971 (aged 70) Mantua, Italy

Cycling career
- Sport: Cycling
Medal record
Representing ITA
Men's cycling
Olympic Games
Gold medal – first place	1928 Amsterdam	Team pursuit

Luigi Tasselli (20 October 1901 – 5 November 1971) was an Italian cyclist. He won the gold medal in the Men's team pursuit in the 1928 Summer Olympics along with Giacomo Gaioni, Mario Lusiani, and Cesare Facciani.
