= Galip Cav =

Turkish cyclist

Personal information
- Born: 3 November 1912 Istanbul, Turkey
- Died: 1950 (aged 37–38)

Cycling career
- Sport: Cycling

Galip Cav (3 November 1912 – 1950) was a Turkish cyclist. He competed in the team pursuit and time trial events at the 1928 Summer Olympics.
