= Giacomo Gaioni =

Italian cyclist (1905–1988)

Personal information
- Born: 26 April 1905 Roverbella, Italy
- Died: 14 November 1988 (aged 83) Mantua, Italy

Cycling career
- Sport: Cycling
Medal record
Representing ITA
Men's cycling
Olympic Games
Gold medal – first place	1928 Amsterdam	Team pursuit

Giacomo Gaioni (26 April 1905 – 14 November 1988) was an Italian cyclist. He won the gold medal in Men's team pursuit in the 1928 Summer Olympics along with Cesare Facciani, Mario Lusiani and Luigi Tasselli.
