= Modern pentathlon at the 1924 Summer Olympics =

Men's modern pentathlon at the Games of the VIII Olympiad
- Venue: Stade Olympique; Piscine des Tourelles; Fontainebleau; Le Stand de Tir de Versailles
- Dates: July 12–17, 1924
- Competitors: 38 from 11 nations

Medalists
1st place, gold medalist(s)		Bo Lindman	Sweden
2nd place, silver medalist(s)		Gustaf Dyrssen	Sweden
3rd place, bronze medalist(s)		Bertil Uggla	Sweden

At the 1924 Summer Olympics in Paris, a single modern pentathlon event was contested. It was the third appearance of the sport; for the third straight time, Sweden swept the medals.

== Participating nations ==
A total of 38 pentathletes from 11 nations competed at the Paris Games:

- Belgium (4)
- Czechoslovakia (2)
- Denmark (3)
- Finland (3)
- France (4)
- Great Britain (4)
- Italy (4)
- Netherlands (4)
- Norway (2)
- Sweden (4)
- United States (4)

== Results ==
=== Shooting ===
Event 1
Place	Athlete	Score	Points
1	Otto Olsen (DEN)	186	1
2	Helge Jensen (DEN)	183	2
3	Carl Årmann (SWE)	183	3
4	Ivan Duranthon (FRA)	182	4
5	Ernest Harmon (USA)	182	5
6	Carolus Stoffels (NED)	180	6
7	Bertil Uggla (SWE)	177	7
8	Raoul Lignon (FRA)	174	8
9	Bo Lindman (SWE)	170	9
10	David Turquand-Young (GBR)	168	10
11	Barent Momma (NED)	172	11
12	Marius Christensen (DEN)	170	12
13	Väinö Bremer (FIN)	170	13
15	Leif Knudtzon (NOR)	167	15
16	George Bare (USA)	169	16
16	Frederick Barton (GBR)	165	16
17	Henrik Avellan (FIN)	164	17
18	Olliver Smith (NOR)	164	18
19	Emil Hagelberg (FIN)	163	19
20	Gustaf Dyrssen (SWE)	160	20
21	Léopold Buffin de Chosal (BEL)	156	21
22	Christiaan Tonnet (NED)	154	22
23	Karel, Jonkheer van den Brandeler (NED)	146	23
24	George Vokins (GBR)	144	24
25	Jacques De Wykerslooth De Rooyesteyn (BEL)	140	25
26	Ernesto Corradi (ITA)	140	26
27	Jules Hulsmans (BEL)	140	27
28	Charles-Jean LeVavasseur (FRA)	142	28
29	Omero Chiesa (ITA)	136	29
30	J. L. M. Van Loocke (BEL)	134	30
31	Guillaume de Tournemire (FRA)	134	31
32	Giuseppe Micheli (ITA)	134	32
33	Frederick Pitts (USA)	134	33
34	Donald Scott (USA)	131	34
35	Brian Horrocks (GBR)	129	35
36	Gaspare Pasta (ITA)	126	36
37	Karel Tůma (TCH)	68	37
38	Jindřich Lepiere (TCH)	55	38

=== Swimming ===
Event 2
Place	Athlete	Time	Points
1	Bo Lindman (SWE)	5:18.6	1
2	Omero Chiesa (ITA)	5:21.6	2
3	David Turquand-Young (GBR)	5:21.8	3
4	Gustaf Dyrssen (SWE)	5:35.6	4
5	Emil Hagelberg (FIN)	5:41.2	5
6	Henrik Avellan (FIN)	5:45.8	6
7	Väinö Bremer (FIN)	5:47.6	7
8	Olliver Smith (NOR)	5:58.8	8
9	Carl Årmann (SWE)	5:59.0	9
10	Marius Christensen (DEN)	6:02.4	10
11	George Vokins (GBR)	6:02.8	11
12	Christiaan Tonnet (NED)	6:03.4	12
13	Charles-Jean LeVavasseur (FRA)	6:08.6	13
14	Brian Horrocks (GBR)	6:12.2	14
15	George Bare (USA)	6:15.8	15
16	J. L. M. Van Loocke (BEL)	6:18.0	16
17	Leif Knudtzon (NOR)	6:21.2	17
18	Ivan Duranthon (FRA)	6:24.4	18
19	Helge Jensen (DEN)	6:24.8	19
20	Léopold Buffin de Chosal (BEL)	6:25.8	20
21	Bertil Uggla (SWE)	6:30.8	21
22	Ernesto Corradi (ITA)	6:34.8	22
23	Carolus Stoffels (NED)	6:38.2	23
24	Frederick Barton (GBR)	6:45.0	24
25	Frederick Pitts (USA)	6:45.8	25
26	Jules Hulsmans (BEL)	6:49.8	26
27	Karel, Jonkheer van den Brandeler (NED)	6:56.4	27
28	Karel Tůma (TCH)	6:58.0	28
29	Guillaume de Tournemire (FRA)	7:39.4	29
30	Barent Momma (NED)	7:40.4	30
31	Jacques De Wykerslooth De Rooyesteyn (BEL)	7:41.6	31
32	Otto Olsen (DEN)	7:43.6	32
33	Donald Scott (USA)	7:56.0	33
34	Raoul Lignon (FRA)	8:00.0	34
35	Giuseppe Micheli (ITA)	8:10.6	35
36	Gaspare Pasta (ITA)	8:13.4	36
37	Ernest Harmon (USA)	8:30.4	37
38	Jindřich Lepiere (TCH)	8:49.8	38

After 2 events
Place	Athlete	Shooting	Swimming	Total
1	Bo Lindman (SWE)	9	1	10
2	Carl Årmann (SWE)	3	9	12
3	David Turquand-Young (GBR)	10	3	13
4	Väinö Bremer (FIN)	13	7	20
5	Helge Jensen (DEN)	2	19	21
6	Marius Christensen (DEN)	12	10	22
6	Ivan Duranthon (FRA)	4	18	22
8	Henrik Avellan (FIN)	17	6	23
9	Gustaf Dyrssen (SWE)	20	4	24
9	Emil Hagelberg (FIN)	19	5	24
11	Olliver Smith (NOR)	18	8	26
12	Bertil Uggla (SWE)	7	21	28
13	Carolus Stoffels (NED)	6	23	29
14	Omero Chiesa (ITA)	29	2	31
14	George Bare (USA)	16	15	31
16	Leif Knudtzon (NOR)	15	17	32
17	Otto Olsen (DEN)	1	32	33
18	Christiaan Tonnet (NED)	22	12	34
19	George Vokins (GBR)	24	11	35
20	Frederick Barton (GBR)	16	24	40
21	Charles-Jean LeVavasseur (FRA)	28	13	41
21	Léopold Buffin de Chosal (BEL)	21	20	41
21	Barent Momma (NED)	11	30	41
24	Raoul Lignon (FRA)	8	34	42
24	Ernest Harmon (USA)	5	37	42
26	J. L. M. Van Loocke (BEL)	30	16	46
27	Ernesto Corradi (ITA)	26	22	48
28	Brian Horrocks (GBR)	35	14	49
29	Karel, Jonkheer van den Brandeler (NED)	23	27	50
30	Jules Hulsmans (BEL)	27	26	53
31	Jacques De Wykerslooth De Rooyesteyn (BEL)	25	31	56
32	Frederick Pitts (USA)	33	25	58
33	Guillaume de Tournemire (FRA)	31	29	60
34	Karel Tůma (TCH)	37	28	65
35	Donald Scott (USA)	34	33	67
35	Giuseppe Micheli (ITA)	32	35	67
37	Gaspare Pasta (ITA)	36	36	72
38	Jindřich Lepiere (TCH)	38	38	76

=== Fencing ===
Event 3
Place	Athlete	Score
1	Gustaf Dyrssen (SWE)	1
2	Gaspare Pasta (ITA)	2
3	Bo Lindman (SWE)	3
4	Marius Christensen (DEN)	4
5	Bertil Uggla (SWE)	5
6	Guillaume de Tournemire (FRA)	6
7	Charles-Jean LeVavasseur (FRA)	7
8	Otto Olsen (DEN)	8
9	Raoul Lignon (FRA)	9
10	George Vokins (GBR)	10
11	Väinö Bremer (FIN)	11.5
11	Helge Jensen (DEN)	11.5
13	Christiaan Tonnet (NED)	13.5
13	Léopold Buffin de Chosal (BEL)	13.5
15	Carl Årmann (SWE)	15.5
15	J. L. M. Van Loocke (BEL)	15.5
17	Ivan Duranthon (FRA)	17.5
17	Henrik Avellan (FIN)	17.5
19	Karel, Jonkheer van den Brandeler (NED)	19.5
19	Jindřich Lepiere (TCH)	19.5
22	Omero Chiesa (ITA)	22.5
22	Jacques De Wykerslooth De Rooyesteyn (BEL)	22.5
22	Donald Scott (USA)	22.5
22	Giuseppe Micheli (ITA)	22.5
26	Carolus Stoffels (NED)	26.5
26	George Bare (USA)	26.5
26	Ernesto Corradi (ITA)	26.5
26	Frederick Pitts (USA)	26.5
30	David Turquand-Young (GBR)	30.5
30	Leif Knudtzon (NOR)	30.5
30	Barent Momma (NED)	30.5
30	Ernest Harmon (USA)	30.5
34	Olliver Smith (NOR)	34.5
34	Brian Horrocks (GBR)	34.5
34	Jules Hulsmans (BEL)	34.5
34	Karel Tůma (TCH)	34.5
37	Emil Hagelberg (FIN)	37.5
37	Frederick Barton (GBR)	37.5

After 3 events
Place	Athlete	Shooting	Swimming	Fencing	Total
1	Bo Lindman (SWE)	9	1	3	13
2	Gustaf Dyrssen (SWE)	20	4	1	25
3	Marius Christensen (DEN)	12	10	4	26
4	Carl Årmann (SWE)	3	9	15.5	27.5
5	Väinö Bremer (FIN)	13	7	11.5	31.5
6	Helge Jensen (DEN)	2	19	11.5	32.5
7	Bertil Uggla (SWE)	7	21	5	33
8	Ivan Duranthon (FRA)	4	18	17.5	39.5
9	Henrik Avellan (FIN)	17	6	17.5	40.5
10	Otto Olsen (DEN)	1	32	8	41
11	David Turquand-Young (GBR)	10	3	30.5	43.5
12	George Vokins (GBR)	24	11	10	45
13	Christiaan Tonnet (NED)	22	12	13.5	47.5
14	Charles-Jean LeVavasseur (FRA)	28	13	7	48
15	Raoul Lignon (FRA)	8	34	9	51
16	Omero Chiesa (ITA)	29	2	22.5	53.5
17	Léopold Buffin de Chosal (BEL)	21	20	13.5	54.5
18	Carolus Stoffels (NED)	6	23	26.5	55.5
19	George Bare (USA)	16	15	26.5	57.5
20	Olliver Smith (NOR)	18	8	34.5	60.5
21	J. L. M. Van Loocke (BEL)	30	16	15.5	61.5
21	Emil Hagelberg (FIN)	19	5	37.5	61.5
23	Leif Knudtzon (NOR)	15	17	30.5	62.5
24	Guillaume de Tournemire (FRA)	31	29	6	66
25	Karel, Jonkheer van den Brandeler (NED)	23	27	19.5	69.5
26	Barent Momma (NED)	11	30	30.5	71.5
27	Ernest Harmon (USA)	5	37	30.5	72.5
28	Gaspare Pasta (ITA)	36	36	2	74
29	Ernesto Corradi (ITA)	26	22	26.5	74.5
30	Frederick Barton (GBR)	16	24	37.5	77.5
31	Jacques De Wykerslooth De Rooyesteyn (BEL)	25	31	22.5	78.5
32	Brian Horrocks (GBR)	35	14	34.5	83.5
33	Frederick Pitts (USA)	33	25	26.5	84.5
34	Jules Hulsmans (BEL)	27	26	34.5	87.5
35	Donald Scott (USA)	34	33	22.5	89.5
35	Giuseppe Micheli (ITA)	32	35	22.5	89.5
37	Jindřich Lepiere (TCH)	38	38	19.5	95.5
38	Karel Tůma (TCH)	37	28	34.5	99.5

=== Equestrian ===
Event 4
Place	Athlete	Score	Points
1	Henrik Avellan (FIN)	147	1
2	Léopold Buffin de Chosal (BEL)	146	2
3	Gustaf Dyrssen (SWE)	136	3
4	Bo Lindman (SWE)	134.5	4
5	Bertil Uggla (SWE)	133	5
6	George Bare (USA)	132	6
7	Karel, Jonkheer van den Brandeler (NED)	130	7
8	George Vokins (GBR)	126.5	8
9	Helge Jensen (DEN)	125	9.5
9	J. L. M. Van Loocke (BEL)	125	9.5
11	Ivan Duranthon (FRA)	124	11
12	Brian Horrocks (GBR)	123	12
13	Guillaume de Tournemire (FRA)	122	13
14	Donald Scott (USA)	114	14
15	Leif Knudtzon (NOR)	113	15
16	Christiaan Tonnet (NED)	112.5	16
17	Jacques De Wykerslooth De Rooyesteyn (BEL)	111.5	17.5
17	Giuseppe Micheli (ITA)	111.5	17.5
19	Charles-Jean LeVavasseur (FRA)	103	19.5
19	Omero Chiesa (ITA)	103	19.5
21	Olliver Smith (NOR)	102	21
22	Ernesto Corradi (ITA)	98	22
23	Carolus Stoffels (NED)	97.5	23
24	Marius Christensen (DEN)	94.5	24
25	Väinö Bremer (FIN)	94	25
26	Emil Hagelberg (FIN)	92.5	26
27	Carl Årmann (SWE)	90.5	27
28	Jules Hulsmans (BEL)	90	28
29	Otto Olsen (DEN)	76	29
30	Barent Momma (NED)	75	30
31	Raoul Lignon (FRA)	64.5	31
32	Ernest Harmon (USA)	40.5	32
33	Karel Tůma (TCH)	37	33
–	David Turquand-Young (GBR)	Elim.	36
–	Gaspare Pasta (ITA)	Elim.	36
–	Frederick Barton (GBR)	Elim.	36
–	Frederick Pitts (USA)	Elim.	36
–	Jindřich Lepiere (TCH)	Elim.	36

After 4 events
Place	Athlete	Shooting	Swimming	Fencing	Equestrian	Total
1	Bo Lindman (SWE)	9	1	3	4	17
2	Gustaf Dyrssen (SWE)	20	4	1	3	28
3	Bertil Uggla (SWE)	7	21	5	5	38
4	Henrik Avellan (FIN)	17	6	17.5	1	41.5
5	Helge Jensen (DEN)	2	19	11.5	9.5	42
6	Marius Christensen (DEN)	12	10	4	24	50
7	Ivan Duranthon (FRA)	4	18	17.5	11	50.5
8	George Vokins (GBR)	24	11	10	8	53
9	Carl Årmann (SWE)	3	9	15.5	27	54.5
10	Léopold Buffin de Chosal (BEL)	21	20	13.5	2	56.5
10	Väinö Bremer (FIN)	13	7	11.5	25	56.5
12	George Bare (USA)	16	15	26.5	6	63.5
12	Christiaan Tonnet (NED)	22	12	13.5	16	63.5
14	Charles-Jean LeVavasseur (FRA)	28	13	7	19.5	67.5
15	Otto Olsen (DEN)	1	32	8	29	70
16	J. L. M. Van Loocke (BEL)	30	16	15.5	9.5	71
17	Omero Chiesa (ITA)	29	2	22.5	19.5	73
18	Karel, Jonkheer van den Brandeler (NED)	23	27	19.5	7	76.5
19	Leif Knudtzon (NOR)	15	17	30.5	15	77.5
20	Carolus Stoffels (NED)	6	23	26.5	23	78.5
21	Guillaume de Tournemire (FRA)	31	29	6	13	79
22	David Turquand-Young (GBR)	10	3	30.5	36	79.5
23	Olliver Smith (NOR)	18	8	34.5	21	81.5
24	Raoul Lignon (FRA)	8	34	9	31	82
25	Emil Hagelberg (FIN)	19	5	37.5	26	87.5
26	Brian Horrocks (GBR)	35	14	34.5	12	95.5
27	Jacques De Wykerslooth De Rooyesteyn (BEL)	25	31	22.5	17.5	96
28	Ernesto Corradi (ITA)	26	22	26.5	22	96.5
29	Barent Momma (NED)	11	30	30.5	30	101.5
30	Donald Scott (USA)	34	33	22.5	14	103.5
31	Ernest Harmon (USA)	5	37	30.5	32	104.5
32	Giuseppe Micheli (ITA)	32	35	22.5	17.5	107
33	Gaspare Pasta (ITA)	36	36	2	36	110
34	Frederick Barton (GBR)	16	24	37.5	36	113.5
35	Jules Hulsmans (BEL)	27	26	34.5	28	115.5
36	Frederick Pitts (USA)	33	25	26.5	36	120.5
37	Jindřich Lepiere (TCH)	38	38	19.5	36	131.5
38	Karel Tůma (TCH)	37	28	34.5	33	132.5

=== Athletics ===
Event 5
Place	Athlete	Time	Score
1	Bo Lindman (SWE)	12:40.0	1
2	Christiaan Tonnet (NED)	12:49.0	2
3	Brian Horrocks (GBR)	13:07.0	3
4	Ivan Duranthon (FRA)	13:08.6	4
5	David Turquand-Young (GBR)	13:11.0	5
6	Olliver Smith (NOR)	13:13.0	6
7	Bertil Uggla (SWE)	13:18.0	7
8	Donald Scott (USA)	13:20.0	8
9	Frederick Barton (GBR)	13:25.0	9
10	Väinö Bremer (FIN)	13:32.0	10
11	Gustaf Dyrssen (SWE)	13:35.0	11.5
11	George Vokins (GBR)	13:35.0	11.5
13	George Bare (USA)	13:45.0	13
14	Henrik Avellan (FIN)	13:46.0	14
15	Charles-Jean LeVavasseur (FRA)	14:06.6	15
16	Otto Olsen (DEN)	14:12.0	16
17	Raoul Lignon (FRA)	14:12.4	17
18	Frederick Pitts (USA)	14:15.0	18
19	Helge Jensen (DEN)	14:19.0	19
20	Carl Årmann (SWE)	14:22.0	20
21	J. L. M. Van Loocke (BEL)	14:28.0	21
22	Leif Knudtzon (NOR)	14:30.0	22
23	Emil Hagelberg (FIN)	14:31.0	23
24	Carolus Stoffels (NED)	14:50.0	24
25	Jules Hulsmans (BEL)	14:58.0	25
26	Ernest Harmon (USA)	15:01.0	26
27	Jacques De Wykerslooth De Rooyesteyn (BEL)	15:08.6	27
28	Guillaume de Tournemire (FRA)	15:22.0	28
29	Barent Momma (NED)	15:25.0	29
30	Giuseppe Micheli (ITA)	15:28.0	30
31	Ernesto Corradi (ITA)	15:42.0	31
32	Gaspare Pasta (ITA)	15:48.0	32
33	Léopold Buffin de Chosal (BEL)	16:03.0	33
34	Karel Tůma (TCH)	16:25.0	34
35	Marius Christensen (DEN)	16:30.0	35
36	Omero Chiesa (ITA)	16:40.0	36
37	Karel, Jonkheer van den Brandeler (NED)	16:46.0	37
38	Jindřich Lepiere (TCH)	17:48.0	38

Final standings
Place	Athlete	Shooting	Swimming	Fencing	Equestrian	Athletics	Total
1st place, gold medalist(s)	Bo Lindman (SWE)	9	1	3	4	1	18
2nd place, silver medalist(s)	Gustaf Dyrssen (SWE)	20	4	1	3	11.5	39.5
3rd place, bronze medalist(s)	Bertil Uggla (SWE)	7	21	5	5	7	45
4	Ivan Duranthon (FRA)	4	18	17.5	11	4	54.5
5	Henrik Avellan (FIN)	17	6	17.5	1	14	55.5
6	Helge Jensen (DEN)	2	19	11.5	9.5	19	61
7	George Vokins (GBR)	24	11	10	8	11.5	64.5
8	Christiaan Tonnet (NED)	22	12	13.5	16	2	65.5
9	Väinö Bremer (FIN)	13	7	11.5	25	10	66.5
10	Carl Årmann (SWE)	3	9	15.5	27	20	74.5
11	George Bare (USA)	16	15	26.5	6	13	76.5
12	Charles-Jean LeVavasseur (FRA)	28	13	7	19.5	15	82.5
13	David Turquand-Young (GBR)	10	3	30.5	36	5	84.5
14	Marius Christensen (DEN)	12	10	4	24	35	85
15	Otto Olsen (DEN)	1	32	8	29	16	86
16	Olliver Smith (NOR)	18	8	34.5	21	6	87.5
17	Léopold Buffin de Chosal (BEL)	21	20	13.5	2	33	89.5
18	J. L. M. Van Loocke (BEL)	30	16	15.5	9.5	21	92
19	Brian Horrocks (GBR)	35	14	34.5	12	3	98.5
20	Raoul Lignon (FRA)	8	34	9	31	17	99
21	Leif Knudtzon (NOR)	15	17	30.5	15	22	99.5
22	Carolus Stoffels (NED)	6	23	26.5	23	24	102.5
23	Guillaume de Tournemire (FRA)	31	29	6	13	28	107
24	Omero Chiesa (ITA)	29	2	22.5	19.5	36	109
25	Emil Hagelberg (FIN)	19	5	37.5	26	23	110.5
26	Donald Scott (USA)	34	33	22.5	14	8	111.5
27	Karel, Jonkheer van den Brandeler (NED)	23	27	19.5	7	37	113.5
28	Frederick Barton (GBR)	16	24	37.5	36	9	122.5
29	Jacques De Wykerslooth De Rooyesteyn (BEL)	25	31	22.5	17.5	27	123
30	Ernesto Corradi (ITA)	26	22	26.5	22	31	127.5
31	Ernest Harmon (USA)	5	37	30.5	32	26	130.5
31	Barent Momma (NED)	11	30	30.5	30	29	130.5
33	Giuseppe Micheli (ITA)	32	35	22.5	17.5	30	137
34	Frederick Pitts (USA)	33	25	26.5	36	18	138.5
35	Jules Hulsmans (BEL)	27	26	34.5	28	25	140.5
36	Gaspare Pasta (ITA)	36	36	2	36	32	142
37	Karel Tůma (TCH)	37	28	34.5	33	34	166.5
38	Jindřich Lepiere (TCH)	38	38	19.5	36	38	169.5
