= Modern pentathlon at the 1928 Summer Olympics =

Men's modern pentathlon at the Games of the IX Olympiad
- Dates: July 31 – August 4, 1928
- Competitors: 37 from 14 nations

Medalists
1st place, gold medalist(s)		Sven Thofelt	Sweden
2nd place, silver medalist(s)		Bo Lindman	Sweden
3rd place, bronze medalist(s)		Helmut Kahl	Germany

At the 1928 Summer Olympics in Amsterdam, a single modern pentathlon event was contested.

The 1928 modern pentathlon was notable in the sport's Olympic history as it marked the first time in four editions of the competition that a non-Swedish competitor won a medal. Sweden had recorded a podium sweep in 1912, 1920, and 1924.

== Participating nations ==
A total of 37 pentathletes (all men) from 14 nations competed at the Amsterdam Games:

- Belgium (3)
- Czechoslovakia (3)
- Denmark (2)
- Finland (3)
- France (3)
- Germany (3)
- Great Britain (3)
- Hungary (1)
- Italy (3)
- Netherlands (3)
- Poland (3)
- Portugal (1)
- Sweden (3)
- United States (3)

== Results ==
Source: Official results

Rank	Competitor	Nation	Shooting rank	Swimming rank	Fencing rank	Running rank	Equestrian rank	Total
1st place, gold medalist(s)	Sven Thofelt	Sweden	6	2	4	21	14	47
2nd place, silver medalist(s)	Bo Lindman	Sweden	15	5	22	3	5	50
3rd place, bronze medalist(s)	Helmuth Kahl	Germany	10	9	2	19	12	52
4	Ingvar Berg	Sweden	3	11	36	7	1	58
5	Heinz Hax	Germany	1	15	21	20	2	59
6	David Turquand-Young	Great Britain	24	7	15	9	10	65
7T	Christiaan Tonnet	Netherlands	8	24	27	4	6	69
7T	Hermann Hölter	Germany	16	8	11	13	21	69
9	Willem van Rhijn	Netherlands	11	10	5	17	28	71
10	Helge Jensen	Denmark	4	20	1	29	19	73
11	Eugenio Pagnini	Italy	9	1	29	6	29	74
12	Zenon Małłysko	Poland	18	19	9	18	13	77
13	Lauri Kettunen	Finland	20	22	18	10	11	81
14	Otto Olsen	Denmark	2	37	6	11	26	82
15T	Aubrey Newman	United States	30	4	10	8	31	83
15T	Henrik Avellan	Finland	31	17	16	15	4	83
15T	Luigi Petrillo	Italy	13	6	33	16	15	83
18	Carlo Simonetti	Italy	19	16	14	32	3	84
19	Richard Mayo	United States	12	23	3	11	37	86
20	Peter Hains	United States	7	26	25	22	7	87
21T	Tauno Lampola	Finland	35	3	31	2	18	89
21T	Alfred Goodwin	Great Britain	5	32	23	14	25	99
23	Tivadar Filótás	Hungary	22	28	8	33	16	107
24T	Tjeerd Pasma	Netherlands	32	13	34	5	24	108
24T	Lance East	Great Britain	17	29	24	30	8	108
26	Stefan Szelestowski	Poland	26	12	35	1	36	110
27	Édouard Écuyer de le Court	Belgium	27	14	12	25	33	111
28	Charles-Jean LeVavasseur	France	14	21	17	26	35	113
29	Paul Coche	France	23	33	7	35	21	119
30	Rudolf Růžička	Czechoslovakia	21	25	19	28	34	127
31	Sebastião Herédia	Portugal	36	18	20	27	32	133
32	Charles Vannerom	Belgium	25	27	26	34	23	135
33	André Crémon	France	33	35	32	24	17	141
34	Franciszek Koprowski	Poland	28	34	30	23	27	142
35T	Josef Schejbal	Czechoslovakia	34	36	13	31	30	144
35T	Charles Cumont	Belgium	29	31	28	36	20	144
37	Kamil Gampe	Czechoslovakia	37	30	37	37	9	150
