= Otto Olsen =

Otto Olsen may refer to:

- Otto Olsen (sport shooter) (1884–1953), Norwegian sport shooter
- Otto Olsen (pentathlete) (1894–1989), Danish pentathlete
