= Vokins =

Vokins is a surname. Notable people with the surname include:

- George Vokins (1896–1985), British modern pentathlete
- Jake Vokins (born 2000), English footballer
- Joan Vokins (?–1690), English Quaker preacher and traveller
