= Tournemire =

Tournemire may refer to:

- Tournemire, Aveyron, France, a commune
- Tournemire, Cantal, France, a commune
- Charles Tournemire (1870-1939), French composer and organist
- Evgenia Tur (1815-1892), married name Countess Elizaveta Vasilyevna Salias De Tournemire, Russian writer, critic, journalist and publisher
- Guillaume de Tournemire (1901–1970), French modern pentathlete
