= Frederick Barton =

Frederick Barton may refer to:

- Fred Barton (composer) (born 1958), American composer and lyricist
- Fred Barton (politician) (1917–1963), British socialist politician
- Frederick Barton (pentathlete) (1900–1993), British pentathlete
- Frederick Otis Barton (1899–1992), American deep-sea diver
- Rick Barton (diplomat) (born 1949), Assistant Secretary for Conflict and Stabilization Operations

== See also ==
- Fredrick Barton, American novelist and New Orleans film critic
