= List of flag bearers for Sweden at the Olympics =

Sweden at the Olympics
- IOC code: SWE
- NOC: Swedish Olympic Committee
- Website: www.sok.se (in Swedish and English)
- Medals: Gold 216 Silver 232 Bronze 242 Total 690

Summer appearances
- 1896; 1900; 1904; 1908; 1912; 1920; 1924; 1928; 1932; 1936; 1948; 1952; 1956; 1960; 1964; 1968; 1972; 1976; 1980; 1984; 1988; 1992; 1996; 2000; 2004; 2008; 2012; 2016; 2020; 2024

Winter appearances
- 1924; 1928; 1932; 1936; 1948; 1952; 1956; 1960; 1964; 1968; 1972; 1976; 1980; 1984; 1988; 1992; 1994; 1998; 2002; 2006; 2010; 2014; 2018; 2022; 2026

Other related appearances
- 1906 Intercalated Games

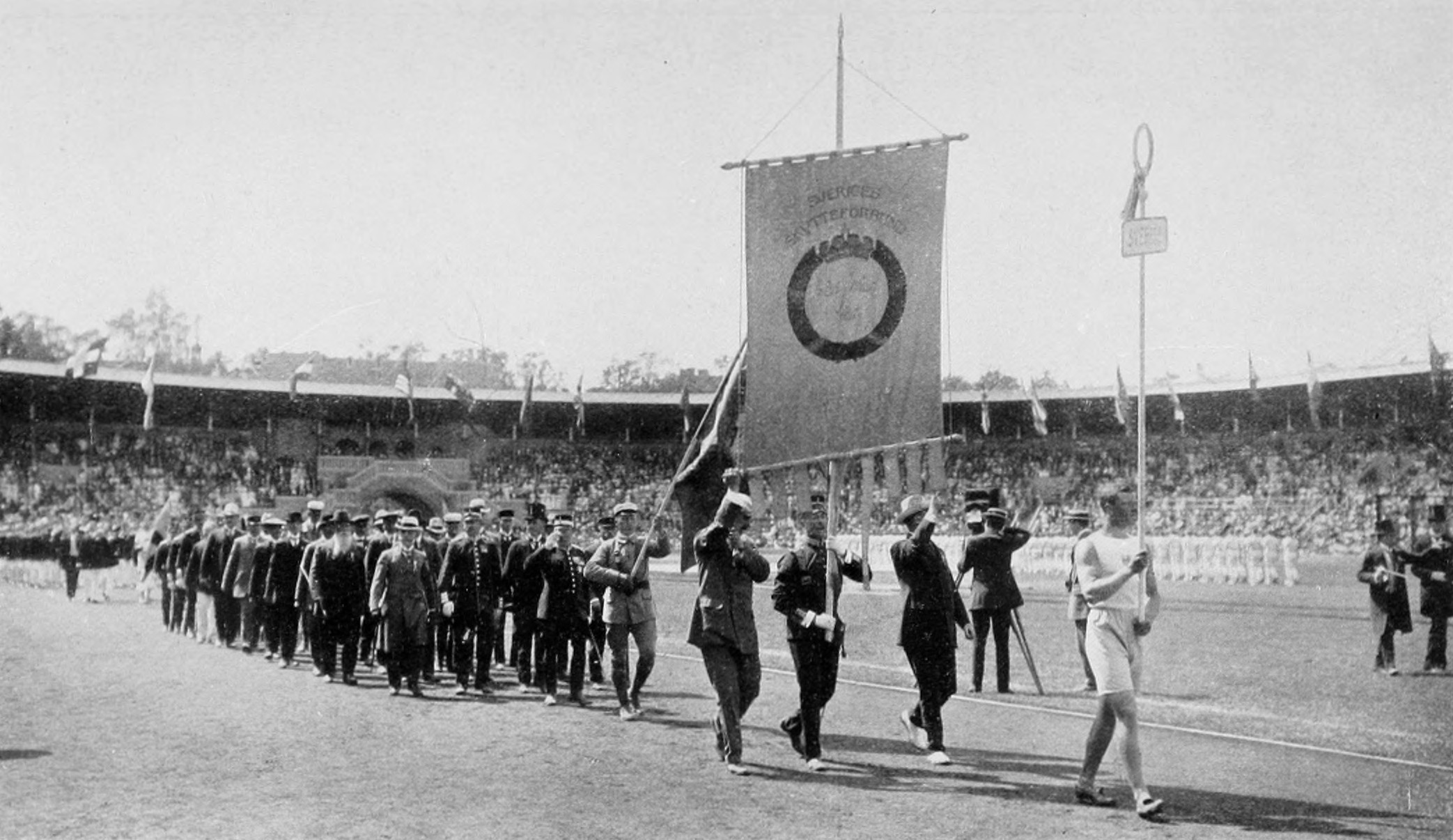
Sweden at the 1912 Summer Olympics

This is a list of flag bearers who have represented Sweden at the Olympics.

Flag bearers carry the national flag of their country at the opening ceremony of the Olympic Games.

#	Event year	Season	Flag bearer	Sport
1	1906	Summer	Bruno Söderström	Athletics (track and field)
2	1908	Summer	Erik Granfelt	Gymnastics
3	1912	Summer	Robert Olsson	Athletics (track and field)
4	1920	Summer	Hans Granfelt	Athletics (track and field)
5	1924	Winter	Ruben Rundquist	Ice hockey official
6	1924	Summer	Einar Råberg	Wrestling official
7	1928	Winter	Viking Harbom	Ice hockey official
8	1928	Summer	Bo Lindman	Modern pentathlon
9	1932	Winter	Sven Selånger	Ski jumping
10	1932	Summer	Bo Lindman	Modern pentathlon, fencing
11	1936	Winter	Sven Selånger	Ski jumping
12	1936	Summer	Bo Lindman	Modern pentathlon official
13	1948	Winter	Erik Lindström	Ski jumping
14	1948	Summer	Per Carleson	Fencing
15	1952	Winter	Erik Elmsäter	Nordic combined
16	1952	Summer	Bo Eriksson	Fencing
17	1956	Winter	Bror Östman	Ski jumping
18	1956	Summer	Gustaf Adolf Boltenstern, Jr.	Equestrianism
19	1956	Summer	Per Carleson	Fencing
20	1960	Winter	Einar Granath	Ice hockey
21	1960	Summer	William Grut	Modern pentathlon official
22	1964	Winter	Carl-Gustav Briandt	Alpine skiing official
23	1964	Summer	William Hamilton	Equestrianism
24	1968	Winter	Barbro Martinsson	Cross-country skiing
25	1968	Summer	Rolf Peterson	Canoe racing
26	1972	Winter	Hasse Börjes	Speed skating
27	1972	Summer	Jan Jönsson	Equestrianism
28	1976	Winter	Carl-Erik Eriksson	Bobsleigh
29	1976	Summer	Jan Karlsson	Wrestling
30	1980	Winter	Eva Olsson	Cross-country skiing
31	1980	Summer	Stig Pettersson	Athletics (track and field) official
32	1984	Winter	Mats Waltin	Ice hockey
33	1984	Summer	Hans Svensson	Rowing
34	1988	Winter	Thomas Wassberg	Cross-country skiing
35	1988	Summer	Agneta Andersson	Canoe racing
36	1992	Winter	Tomas Gustafson	Speed skating
37	1992	Summer	Stefan Edberg	Tennis
38	1994	Winter	Pernilla Wiberg	Alpine skiing
39	1996	Summer	Jan-Ove Waldner	Table tennis
40	1998	Winter	Torgny Mogren	Cross-country skiing
41	2000	Summer	Anna Olsson	Canoe racing
42	2002	Winter	Magdalena Forsberg	Biathlon
43	2004	Summer	Lars Frölander	Swimming
44	2006	Winter	Anja Pärson	Alpine skiing
45	2008	Summer	Christian Olsson	Athletics (track and field)
46	2010	Winter	Peter Forsberg	Ice hockey
47	2012	Summer	Rolf-Göran Bengtsson	Equestrianism
48	2014	Winter	Anders Södergren	Cross-country skiing
49	2016	Summer	Therese Alshammar	Swimming
50	2018	Winter	Niklas Edin	Curling
51	2020	Summer	Sara Algotsson Ostholt	Equestrianism
51	2020	Summer	Max Salminen	Sailing
52	2022	Winter	Oliwer Magnusson	Freestyle skiing
52	2022	Winter	Emma Nordin	Ice hockey
53	2024	Summer	Peder Fredricson	Equestrian
53	2024	Summer	Josefin Olsson	Sailing

== See also ==
- Sweden at the Olympics
