= Bo Lindman =

Modern pentathlete, fencer

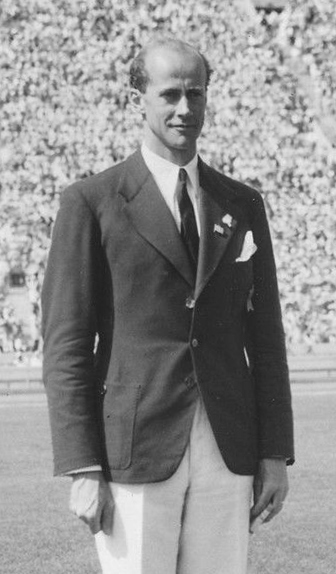
- Lindman at the 1932 Summer Olympics in Los Angeles, California, USA

Personal information
- Nationality: Swedish
- Born: 8 February 1899 Stockholm, Sweden
- Died: 30 July 1992 (aged 93) Stockholm, Sweden

Sport
- Country: Sweden
- Sport: Modern pentathlon
Medal record
Representing Sweden
Olympic Games
Gold medal – first place	1924 Paris	Modern pentathlon
Silver medal – second place	1928 Amsterdam	Modern pentathlon
Silver medal – second place	1932 Los Angeles	Modern pentathlon

Bo Lindman (8 February 1899 – 30 July 1992) was a Swedish modern pentathlete. He participated at the 1924, 1928 and 1932 Summer Olympics and won one gold and two silver medals; in 1932 he also competed in the individual épée fencing event. Lindman was the Olympic flag bearer for Sweden in 1928, 1932 and 1936.

Lindman was the Nordic Champion in 1923 and Swedish champion in 1923 and 1924 in modern pentathlon. Between 1936 and 1946 he headed the Athletics Federation of Sweden, and in 1949 became treasurer of the Union Internationale de Pentathlon Moderne. Lindman was a career military officer, retiring in the rank of lieutenant colonel. He later became director of the Swedish Transport Association.
