= Väinö Bremer =

Finnish biathlete and modern pentathlete

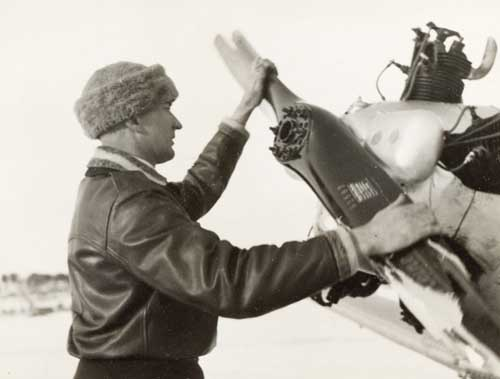
- Väinö Bremer

Personal information
- Full name: Väinö Elias Bremer
- Born: 24 April 1899 Turku, Finland
- Died: 23 December 1964 (aged 65) Kerava, Finland

Sport
- Sport: Skiing
Medal record
Representing Finland
Men's military patrol
Olympic Games
Silver medal – second place	1924 Chamonix	Team

Väinö Elias Bremer (24 April 1899 – 23 December 1964) was a Finnish biathlete, modern pentathlete, and pilot who competed in the 1924 Winter Olympics and in the 1924 Summer Olympics. He was born in Turku.

In 1924 Winter Games he was a member of the Finnish military patrol team which won the silver medal. He also competed in the 1924 Summer Games and finished seventh in the Modern pentathlon event.

After Olympic competition Bremer pursued aviation, including as a captain in the Finnish Air Force. In 1927 he won the Finnish Harmon Trophy. He flew from Helsinki to Cape Town and back in 1933 in a Junkers A50 Junior, which was displayed in the Helsinki Airport from 1976 to 2018.

He was killed in a plane crash in Kerava, Finland, on 23 December 1964.
