= Military Office of the Ministry of Defence =

Former establishment in Sweden

The Military Office of the [Royal Swedish] Ministry of Defence (Swedish: Försvarsdepartementets kommandoexpedition, FKE), previously the Military Office of the [Swedish] Minister of Defence (Swedish: Försvarets kommandoexpedition, FKE), was an office in the Royal Chancery from 1945 to 1974 and in the Government Offices from 1975 to 1979, where all so-called ‘military command matters’ were handled and from where these accompanying dispatches (including general orders) were issued.

== History ==
The Military Office of the Minister of Defence (Försvarets kommandoexpedition) was formed in 1945 after the amalgamation of the Military Office of the Land Defence (Lantförsvarets kommandoexpedition), the Military Office of the Naval Defence (Sjöförsvarets kommandoexpedition) and the Military Office of the Air Force (Flygvapnets kommandoexpedition). These changes drew strong criticism in military circles, where they felt that they could become a gateway for ministerial rule of the Swedish defense. The office consisted, according to its instruction of 15 June 1945 (with amendment on 11 February 1955), of a chief, adjutant to the chief, the Army Section, Air Force Section and Navy Section, Conscription Office (Värnpliktsdetaljen), Service Message and List Office (Tjänstemeddelande- och rulldetaljen) and the Registrar Office (Registratorsdetaljen).

The Military Office of the Minister of Defence was responsible for so-called ‘military command matters’, i.e. such governmental affairs in which the King, in his capacity as Supreme Commander of the Swedish Armed Forces, decided. In 1965 the office was renamed the Military Office of the Ministry of Defence (Försvarsdepartementets kommandoexpedition). Then it consisted of a chief, the Army Section, Air Force Section and Navy Section and the Swedish Armed Forces' List/Register (Svenska försvarsväsendets rulla). It ceased as an independent organization in 1979/80 and in 1980 it was renamed Ministry of Defence's International Unit (Försvarsdepartementets internationella enhet, Fö/INT).

== Chiefs ==
The Chief of the Military Office of the [Royal Swedish] Ministry of Defence (Chefen för Försvarsdepartementets kommandoexpedition), before 1965 called the Chief of the Military Office of the [Swedish] Minister of Defence (Chefen för Försvarets kommandoexpedition):

- 1945–1951: Henry Kellgren
- 1951–1960: Carl Årmann
- 1960–1961: Holger Henning (acting)
- 1961–1970: Holger Henning
- 1970–1978: Dag Arvas
- 1978–1979: Carl-Fredrik Algernon
