= Holger Henning =

Swedish Navy officer (1905–1981)

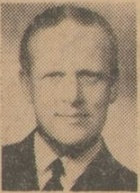
- Henning as rear admiral.
- Born: Carl Holger Holter Henning; 30 July 1905; Härnösand, Sweden
- Died: 4 February 1981 (aged 75); Stockholm, Sweden
- Burial place: Galärvarvskyrkogården
- Military career
- Allegiance: Sweden
- Branch: Swedish Navy
- Service years: 1927–1970
- Rank: Vice Admiral
- Commands: HSwMS Gotland; Section II, Defence Staff; Military Office of the Ministry of Defence

Vice Admiral Carl Holger Holter Henning (30 July 1905 – 4 February 1981) was a Swedish Navy officer whose career included naval command, strategic planning, and senior defence administration. Commissioned in 1927, he served aboard several warships and held various positions in the Naval Staff, including during the Second World War, when he served aboard HSwMS Gustaf V and HSwMS Gotland. He later headed the Operations Department of the Naval Staff and, from 1953 to 1960, served in the Defence Staff. Promoted to rear admiral in 1960, he became Chief of the Military Office of the Ministry of Defence, a position he held until his retirement in 1970. He also served as aide-de-camp to Crown Prince Gustaf Adolf and later as senior aide-de-camp to King Gustaf VI Adolf. He was ceremonially promoted to vice admiral upon retirement.

== Early life ==
Henning was born on 30 July 1905 in Härnösand Parish in Härnösand, Sweden, the son of Carl Henning and his wife Caroline Holter-Hedström. He passed studentexamen in Stockholm in 1924.

== Career ==
Henning was commissioned as an officer in the Swedish Navy in 1927 with the rank of acting sub-lieutenant and then served aboard different coastal defence ships. He studied at the Royal Swedish Naval Staff College from 1933 to 1935 and served in the Naval Staff from 1935 to 1936, 1938 to 1939 and from 1942 to 1944. During the war years he served as an artillery officer on HSwMS Gustaf V and executive officer on the cruiser HSwMS Gotland. Henning was promoted to lieutenant commander in 1944 and then served as a teacher at the Royal Swedish Naval Staff College from 1946 to 1947.

In 1949, Henning was promoted to commander and he served as head of the Operations Department in the Naval Staff from 1949 to 1952. From January to March 1953, Henning captained HSwMS Gotland on a trip to Dakar in West Africa. He was promoted to captain in 1953 and served as head of Section II in the Defence Staff from 1953 to 1960. In 1960, Henning was promoted to rear admiral and he served as Acting Chief of the Military Office of the Ministry of Defence from 1960 to 1961 and then as Chief of the same from 1961 to 1970. He retired and was given a tombstone promotion to vice admiral on 1 October 1970.

Henning became ADC to Crown Prince Gustaf Adolf in 1943 and served him until he became king Gustaf VI Adolf in 1953. He then served the king as senior ADC from 1953 to 1973. He was an expert in the 1941 Defense Inquiry and in the 1945 Defense Committee.

== Personal life ==
In 1931, Henning married Dagmar Örnberg (1910–2000), the daughter of Major General Arthur Örnberg (1883–1967) and Carmen Hagander (1888–1982). He was the father of Birgitta (born 1933), Catharina (born 1936), and Per (born 1942).

== Death ==
Henning died on 4 February 1981 in Oscar Parish in Stockholm. The funeral was held on 12 February 1981 in Hedvig Eleonora Church in Stockholm. He was interred at Galärvarvskyrkogården in Stockholm on 27 April 1981.

== Dates of rank ==
- 1927 – Acting sub-lieutenant
- 19?? – Sub-lieutenant
- 19?? – Lieutenant
- 1944 – Lieutenant commander
- 1949 – Commander
- 1953 – Captain
- 1960 – Rear admiral
- 1 October 1970 – Vice admiral

== Awards and decorations ==
=== Swedish ===
- (Sweden) King Gustaf V's Jubilee Commemorative Medal (1948)
- (Sweden) Commander Grand Cross of the Order of the Sword (6 June 1969)
- (Sweden) Commander 1st Class of the Order of the Sword (6 June 1961)
- (Sweden) Knight of the Order of Vasa (1942)

=== Foreign ===
- (Norway) Commander with Star of the Order of St. Olav (1 July 1961)
- Commander of the Order of the White Rose of Finland
- (France) Commander of the Legion of Honour
- (Netherlands) Officer of the Order of Orange-Nassau with Swords
- (Netherlands) Inhuldigingsmedaille 1948 (8 June 1949)
- Grand Decoration of Honour in Silver with Star for Services to the Republic of Austria (1962)

== Honours ==
- Member of the Royal Swedish Society of Naval Sciences (1943; honorary member in 1960)
- Member of the Royal Swedish Academy of War Sciences (1955)

Military offices
Preceded by Erik af Klint	Section II of the Defence Staff; 1953–1960	Succeeded by Oscar Krokstedt
Preceded by Carl Årmann	Military Office of the Ministry of Defence; 1961–1970	Succeeded by Dag Arvas
