= Peter Forsberg =

Swedish ice hockey player (born 1973)

- Hockey Hall of Fame, 2014
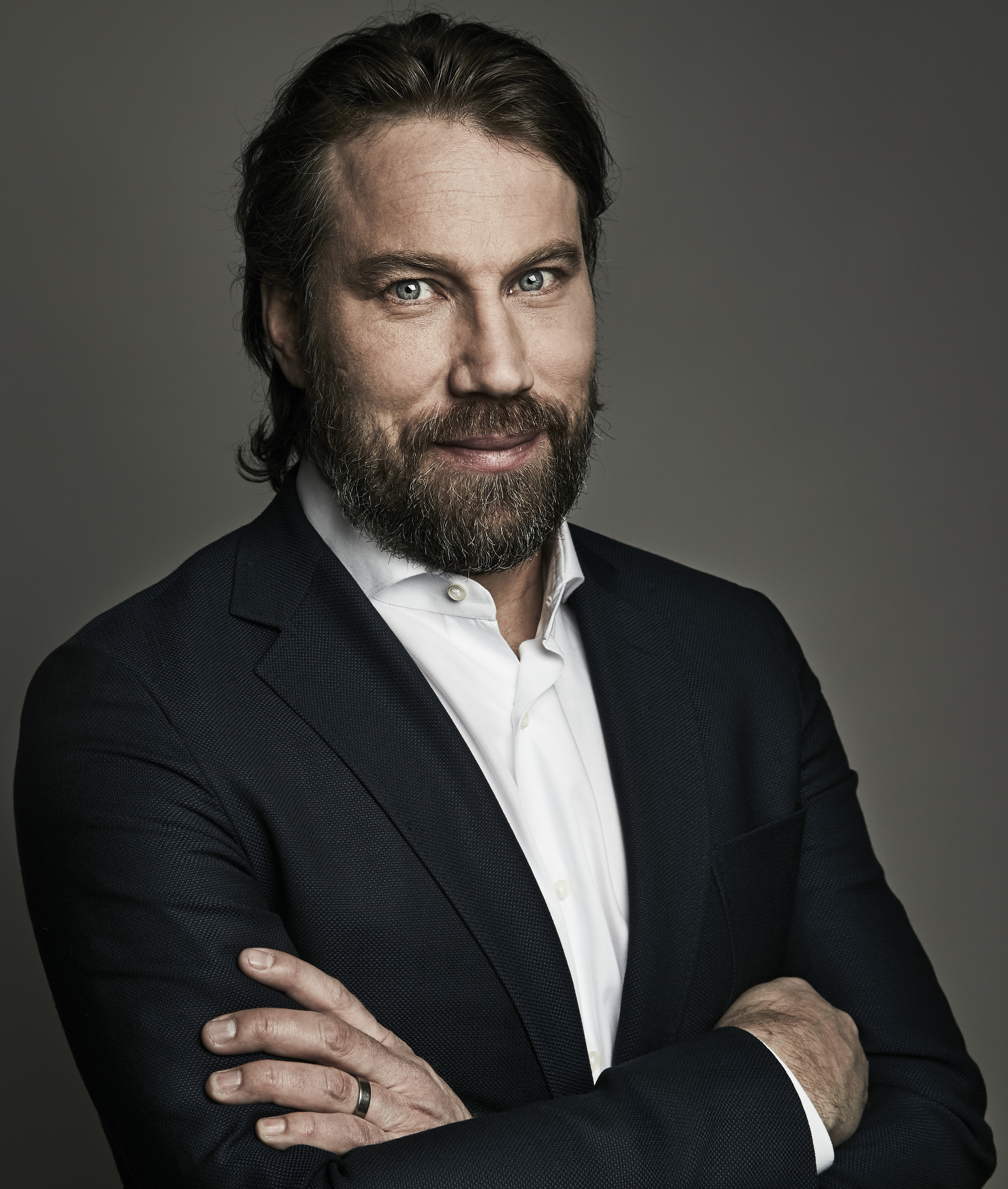
- Forsberg in 2016
- Born: 20 July 1973 (age 53) Örnsköldsvik, Sweden
- Height: 6 ft 0 in (183 cm)
- Weight: 205 lb (93 kg; 14 st 9 lb)
- Position: Centre
- Shot: Left
- Played for: Modo Hockey; Quebec Nordiques; Colorado Avalanche; Philadelphia Flyers; Nashville Predators
- National team: Sweden
- NHL draft: 6th overall, 1991; Philadelphia Flyers
- Playing career: 1989–2011

Peter Mattias Forsberg (pronounced [ˈpěːtɛr ˈfɔ̂ʂːbærj]; born 20 July 1973) is a Swedish former professional ice hockey player and former assistant general manager of Modo Hockey. Nicknamed "Peter the Great" and "Foppa", Forsberg was known for his on-ice vision and physical play, and is considered one of the greatest players of all time. Although his career was shortened by persistent injuries, as of 2024, he stands ninth all-time in career points-per-game and fifth all-time in career assists-per-game in the NHL, behind only Wayne Gretzky, Mario Lemieux, Bobby Orr, and Connor McDavid. In 2017 Forsberg was named one of the '100 Greatest NHL Players' in history.

His 19-year professional career includes 13 years in the National Hockey League (NHL), where he won two Stanley Cups with the Colorado Avalanche, as well as several individual honors including the Hart Memorial Trophy in 2003. As of the end of the 2017–18 season, he is the seventh-highest all-time Swedish point scorer in the NHL regular season. Before his short-lived comeback season in 2011, Forsberg never had a negative plus-minus rating, giving him an overall career rating of +238.

Representing Sweden in international play, Forsberg competed in four Winter Olympics, two World Cups and five World Championships, as well as one European Junior Championship and two World Junior Championships, where he holds a scoring record of 31 points in seven games that some say may never be broken. He won four gold medals with Sweden in his career, winning titles at the 1992 and 1998 World Championships and the 1994 and 2006 Winter Olympics. Combined with his two Stanley Cup championships in NHL play, he is a member of the Triple Gold Club and the only Swede who has won each of the three competitions twice. In 2013, he was inducted to the IIHF Hall of Fame, and in 2014, he was elected into the Hockey Hall of Fame.

== Early life ==
Peter Forsberg was born in Örnsköldsvik, Sweden, the son of Kent Forsberg, a former coach of Modo Hockey and the Swedish national team. Forsberg was coached by his father for a significant part of his career: the two teamed up from 1991 to 1994 with Modo and later for the national team in the 1996 World Cup, 1998 Olympics and 1998 World Championship, which Sweden won.

Forsberg played minor hockey alongside childhood friend Markus Näslund, who was also born in Örnsköldsvik. Born ten days apart, the two were well-acquainted while playing on separate youth teams before joining on the regional Ångermanland all-star team for the under-16 TV-pucken national championship in 1988. They went on to compete alongside each other at the junior and men's level for both Modo Hockey and the Swedish national team. Forsberg and Näslund also attended high school together and had summer jobs at the age of 18 with the same electrical company that employed both Näslund's mother and Forsberg's father.

Growing up, Forsberg's idol was Elitserien and NHL star Håkan Loob.

== Playing career ==
=== Modo Hockey (1989–1994) ===
We played a good game but... they scored their first two [goals] in power play, and that's not so strange; they had about 15 chances. I have to say that I'm so goddamn disappointed in Börje; he is so fucking bad. He is so fucking bad that I could punch him. He increases the [tolerance] level when they've scored their two goals.

— Forsberg criticising the main referee, Börje Johansson, after his Modo lost the fifth and decisive final against Malmö in 1994

Forsberg debuted in 1990 with the junior squad of Modo Hockey, the club in his hometown Örnsköldsvik. During the course of the season, he debuted with the senior team in the Elitserien, the highest-level professional ice hockey league in Sweden, and scored an assist in his only game. In 1990–91, he scored 102 points in 39 games with the junior team and 17 points in 23 games with the senior team.

At the end of the season, Forsberg was drafted sixth overall by the Philadelphia Flyers in the 1991 NHL entry draft, the first European player taken that year. The draft pick was surprising because Forsberg was expected to be selected later in the draft. The Hockey News had ranked Forsberg as the 25th best draft prospect in its 1991 draft preview, saying he was "a solid second rounder who could move into the first." The pick was criticized by the Philadelphia media, prompting Flyers' General Manager Russ Farwell and the team's chief European scout Inge Hammarström to reply that time would prove them right.

Eric Lindros was the main attraction of the draft. He was drafted first overall by the Quebec Nordiques but refused to sign a contract and, on advice from his mother, began a holdout that lasted over a year. Forsberg was included in a deal that sent five players, two first-round draft picks, and US$15 million to the Quebec Nordiques in exchange for Lindros. In hindsight, the Lindros trade is seen as one of the most one-sided deals in sports history, and the deal became a major foundation for the Nordiques/Avalanche franchise's success over the next decade.

Forsberg remained in Sweden, playing for Modo for the following three years. In 1993, the team was eliminated in the playoffs quarterfinals against Malmö, but Forsberg won the Guldpucken for Player of the Year and the Guldhjälmen for Most Valuable Player of the Elitserien, an award decided by the players. He won both prizes again in 1994 when, after barely making the playoffs, he led his team to their first final since winning the Elitserien playoffs in 1979. In a five-game series, again against Malmö, Forsberg scored in overtime in game two to put his team one win away from the title. However, he suffered from the flu (influenza v) and Modo lost the remaining games of the series and the title. By this point, Forsberg was thought to be the best player in the world outside the NHL. After losing the deciding game 3–1, Forsberg expressed his frustration on the ice, first by breaking his stick and then in an interview where he criticised the game's referee, Börje Johansson, for giving Malmö many power plays, resulting in their first two goals, and then increasing the tolerance level. Forsberg's words that he wanted to give Börje a hit has become popular in Swedish ice hockey areas. Börje later denied calling the game in favor of Malmö and stated that Forsberg hadn't given him a hit.

During the summer of 1994, Forsberg decided to play in the NHL after previously signing a contract with the Quebec Nordiques in October 1993. It was a four-year deal worth $6.5 million, including $4.275 million given as a signing bonus. However, a lockout delayed his NHL debut until 1995, and Forsberg returned to Modo to play 11 more games before going back to North America.

=== Quebec Nordiques / Colorado Avalanche (1995–2004) ===
After the lockout ended, the 1994–95 NHL season began on January 21, 1995. That day, Forsberg made his NHL debut against the Philadelphia Flyers, the team that drafted him, and recorded his first NHL assist. His first NHL goal came six days later against the Buffalo Sabres. His rookie season in the NHL was impressive—Forsberg was able to combine a good offensive performance with responsibility on defence as well as physical play. He scored 50 points (15 goals and 35 assists) in 47 games, including a 14-game run in which he scored 26 points, and was second in scoring on the Nordiques, behind Joe Sakic. He missed only one game, due to the flu. The Nordiques won the Northeast Division and had the second-best record in the league in the regular season, but lost in the first playoff round against the New York Rangers. At the end of the season, Forsberg won the Calder Memorial Trophy for best rookie in the league and was selected to the NHL All-Rookie Team.

On July 1, 1995, it became official that the Nordiques' owner Marcel Aubut had sold the team to the COMSAT Entertainment Group, which moved the franchise to Denver, Colorado. The franchise was presented as the Colorado Avalanche on 10 August 1995. It turned out Forsberg had scored the last goal in Nordiques history in game six against the Rangers.

Forsberg was on a team that included center and captain Joe Sakic, defenceman Adam Foote and, in the near future, Vezina and Conn Smythe Trophy winner Patrick Roy. In its first year in Denver, the Avalanche won the Stanley Cup after finishing the regular season with the second-best league record and winning the Pacific Division. Forsberg scored 116 points in the regular season (30 goals, 86 assists) and 21 more in the playoffs (10 goals, 11 assists). Forsberg finished second in points on the team and fifth overall in the league in the regular and post-season. During game two of the Stanley Cup Final against the Florida Panthers, Forsberg became the sixth player in NHL history to score three goals in one period. Not only was the 1995–96 NHL season Forsberg's highest-scoring year, but it would also be the only NHL season in which he played in all his team's games.

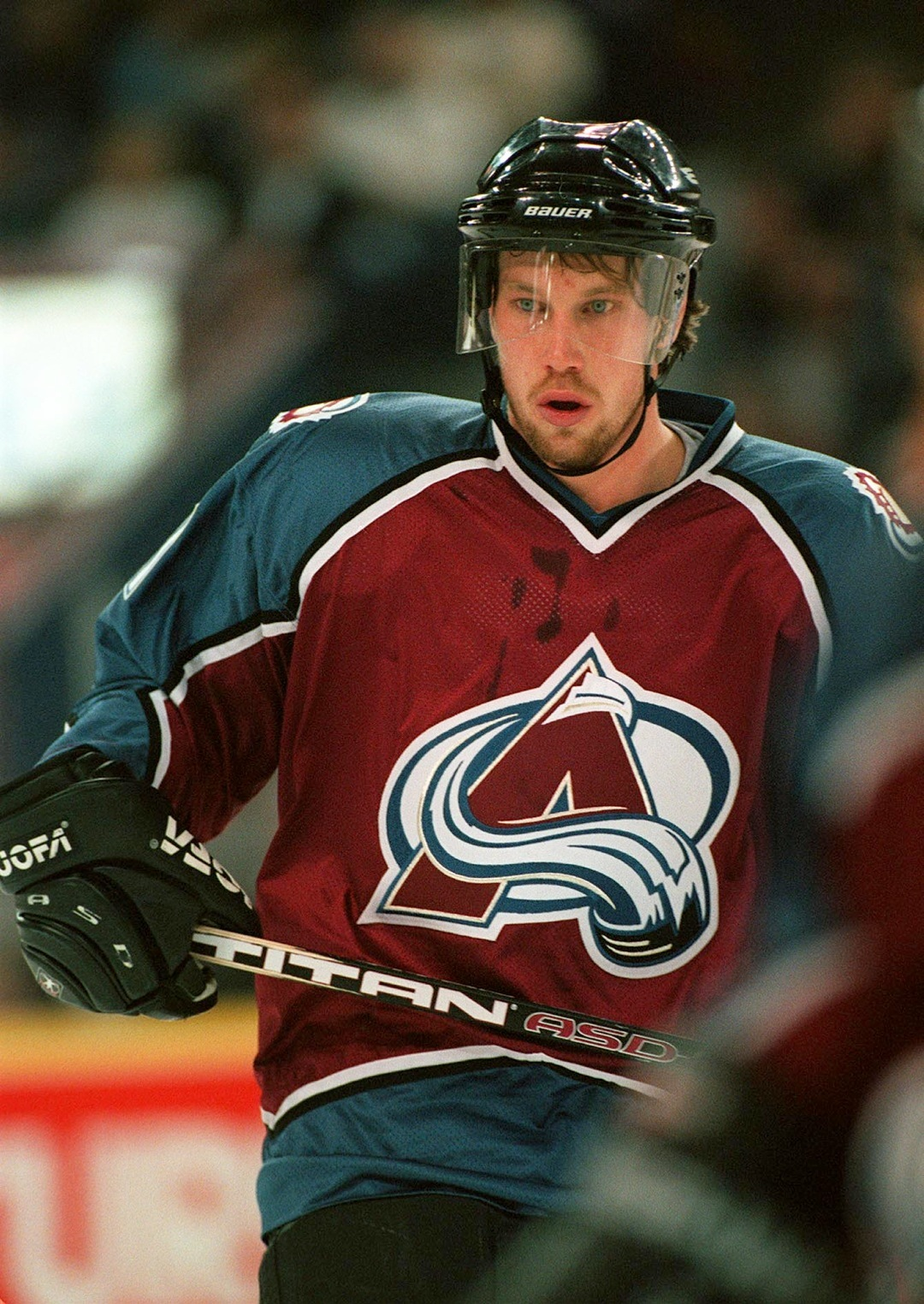
Forsberg with the Colorado Avalanche in 1997

In the 1996–97 season, Forsberg played in only 65 regular-season games and 14 of Colorado's 17 playoff games due to a bruised thigh. But he recorded 86 points (28 goals, 58 assists) as Colorado earned its first Presidents' Trophy and the third consecutive division title for the franchise. On March 16, 1997, Forsberg participated in the only fight of his NHL career against Detroit Red Wings winger Martin Lapointe. The fight occurred 10 days before the famous Red Wings–Avalanche brawl. In the playoffs, Colorado lost in the Conference Finals against Detroit; Forsberg scored 17 points (five goals, 12 assists).

The same year, Forsberg was chosen to be on the cover of NHL 98, a video game made by EA Sports.

In 2001, the Avalanche won their second Stanley Cup. After the Avalanche defeated the Los Angeles Kings in the second round of the playoffs, Forsberg had to have his spleen removed and could not play again in the playoffs. Based on doctors' advice and his overall deteriorated health, he decided to take the following season off to recuperate. He returned for the playoffs, though, and he again led the playoffs in scoring with 27 points, but his team lost to the Detroit Red Wings in the Western Conference finals.

2002–03 was a banner year for Forsberg. He centered the highly productive "AMP line" (i.e. Alex, Milan, Peter) with wingers Alex Tanguay and Milan Hejduk as part of the Colorado Avalanche's "one-two punch" offensive plan led by centers Forsberg and Joe Sakic. Much healthier and more rested than he had been in the previous few years, he went on to lead the league with 106 points, for which he was awarded the Art Ross Trophy, as well as the Hart Memorial Trophy for league MVP. The Avalanche lost to the Minnesota Wild in the playoffs.

=== Philadelphia Flyers (2005–2007) ===
Peter Forsberg returned to Modo Hockey during the 2004–05 NHL lockout. He had signed a one-year contract even before the 2004–05 NHL season was confirmed cancelled. Coached by his father and teammates with NHL players Henrik and Daniel Sedin and Markus Näslund, Forsberg played only 33 of Modo's 50 regular season games because of surgery after dislocating his left wrist and breaking a bone in his hand. He scored 39 points (13 goals and 26 assists) and tied for eighth in the league scoring race. Modo finished sixth in the regular season and lost in the first round of the playoffs against Färjestad BK in a six-game series in which Forsberg only played one game.

After the season and with the return of the NHL, Forsberg returned to North America. The implementation of a salary cap was a blow to the Colorado Avalanche, one of the highest spenders in the league, and they were forced to let go of Forsberg and Adam Foote to save room in the cap for Joe Sakic and Rob Blake. He refused a four-year, $13.5 million offer from the Avalanche before signing a two-year, $11.5 million contract with the Philadelphia Flyers, the team that drafted Forsberg 14 years earlier.

Before the season started, he had surgery to remove a bursa sac from his right ankle. He debuted with the Flyers on October 5 against the New York Rangers. He registered two assists in his first game and 12 in his first six. Despite playing only 60 games, mostly because of a groin injury, he scored 75 points (19 goals and 56 assists). The Flyers lost in the first round of the playoffs against the Buffalo Sabres.

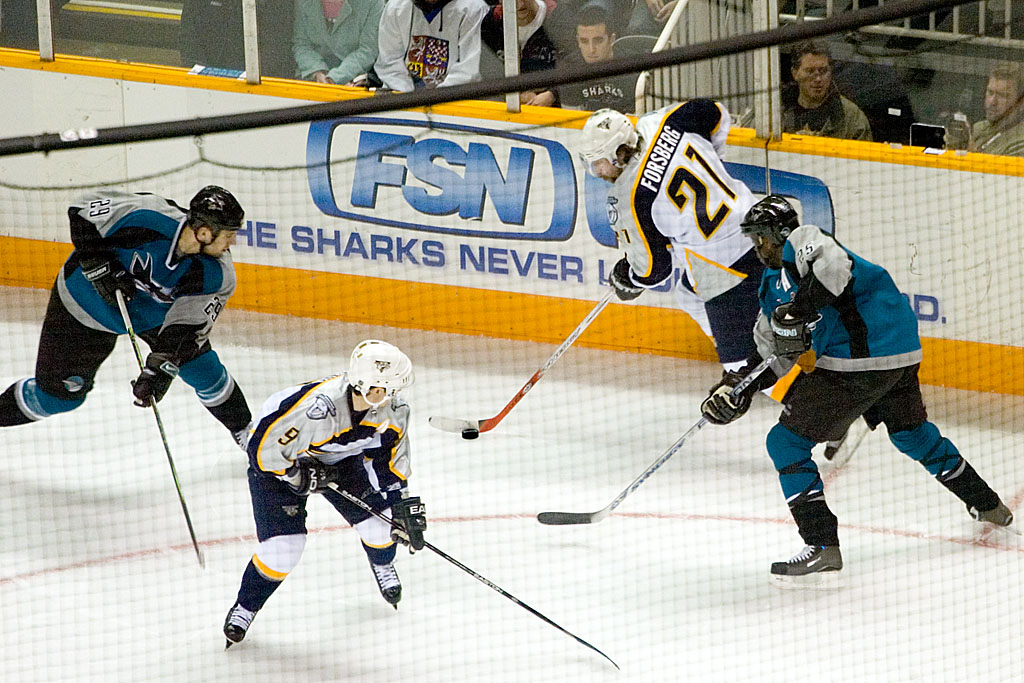
Peter Forsberg with the Nashville Predators playing against the San Jose Sharks in 2007.

After the season, he had surgery on his right ankle and foot to correct deformities because of an abnormal arch that caused him to stretch his ankle tendons. He was expected to have the same surgery done on his left foot and be sidelined until January, but a doctor decided he did not need it and he was ready to play by the start of the 2006–07 NHL season. On 14 September 2006, Forsberg became the 15th captain in Flyers history, replacing Derian Hatcher (the interim captain after Keith Primeau retired). The season was troubled for him: while the Flyers were having their worst season ever, Forsberg had not fully recovered from his right foot problems and had doubts about his future.

=== Nashville Predators (2007) ===
With his contract over at the end of the season and with no commitment on Forsberg's part to signing a new contract or to retire, on February 15, shortly before the trade deadline, the Flyers traded him to the Nashville Predators in exchange for Ryan Parent, Scottie Upshall, and Nashville's first- and third-round 2007 picks to boost Nashville's playoff run. The Predators' last regular season game was at Colorado, and Forsberg returned to Denver for the first time since leaving the Avalanche. The Predators won and Colorado missed the playoffs as a result. This was the first time the Avalanche failed to make the playoffs since moving to Colorado. The Predators lost in the first round of the playoffs against the San Jose Sharks, with Forsberg scoring four points in the five-game series. Forsberg had an average of less than one point per game in the regular season for the first time in his career and second time in the playoffs.

=== Final years and retirement (2007–2011) ===
For most of the 2007–08 season, Forsberg was an unrestricted free agent and said that he would not return to the NHL. He had surgery on his foot and was waiting to see if he was in condition to play. He said that in Europe, he would only play for Modo Hockey, and in the NHL he would probably play for one of his former three clubs. On 25 February 2008, Forsberg signed a contract with the Colorado Avalanche for the rest of the 2007–08 season.

Forsberg's first game back with the Avalanche was on 4 March 2008, home at the Pepsi Center against the Vancouver Canucks. However, he was sidelined after just three games due to a groin injury. He was listed by the club as day-to-day. On April 1, against Vancouver, he scored his first goal of the season in Colorado's penultimate regular-season game.

After coming back from a 10-month break Forsberg was first among all NHL players in points-per-game (PPG) during the 2007–08 regular season. His average of 1.56 PPG in nine games put him ahead of the league's top scorer, Alexander Ovechkin, who posted 1.37 PPG, although Ovechkin played all 82 games.

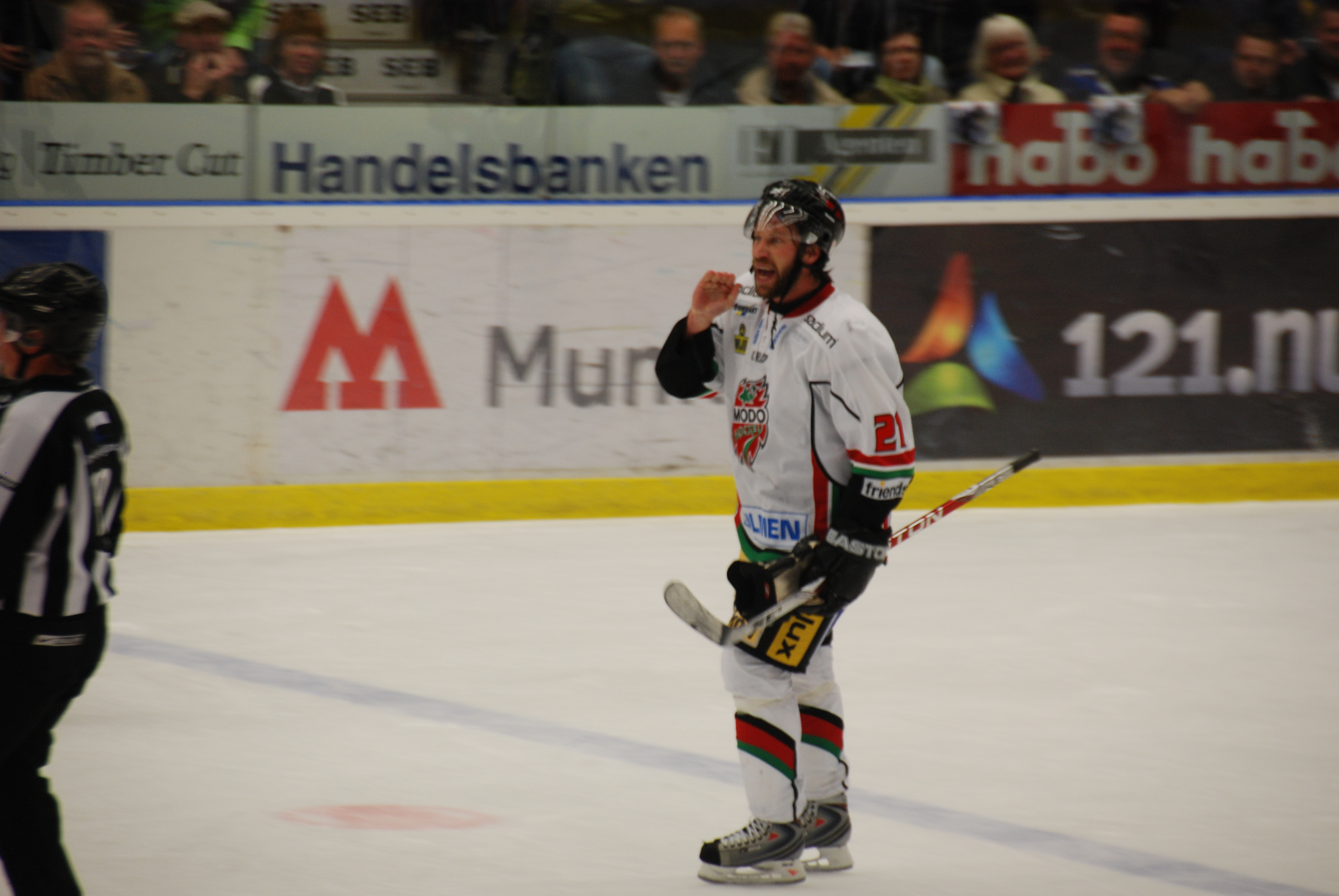
Forsberg with Modo Hockey in 2009

Forsberg played two seasons with Modo from 2008 to 2010, being joined by countryman Markus Näslund in the second year. On 14 August 2010, Forsberg announced he was not optimistic about returning to hockey, hinting he may retire.

On 21 January 2011, it was announced that Forsberg had begun training with the Colorado Avalanche in an attempt to make a comeback in the NHL.

On 6 February, the Avalanche announced that they had come to terms on a contract with Forsberg worth $1 million for the remainder of the 2010–11 season. Forsberg played his first game back with the Avalanche in Nationwide Arena against the Columbus Blue Jackets on 11 February. He was in the starting lineup at left wing, a departure from his natural center, with 2001 Stanley Cup-winning teammate Milan Hejduk, as well as Matt Duchene. In the two road games he played in, Forsberg was on the ice for 17 minutes and 38 seconds, with zero points and a −4 plus-minus rating. The Avalanche lost both games. After the latter game, Avalanche Head Coach Joe Sacco stated Forsberg was the best player on the ice.

The Avalanche, in the midst of a losing season, heavily advertised tickets for Forsberg's first home game back as a member of the team. However, on 14 February 2011, hours before he was scheduled to play in front of the Avalanche's home fans at the Pepsi Center, Forsberg announced his retirement from hockey. The Avalanche's official website stated that Forsberg would hold a press conference later that day, formally announcing his retirement. In the press conference, Forsberg cited an "inability to defend [himself]" on the ice and foot problems as reasons for his decision.

== After retirement ==
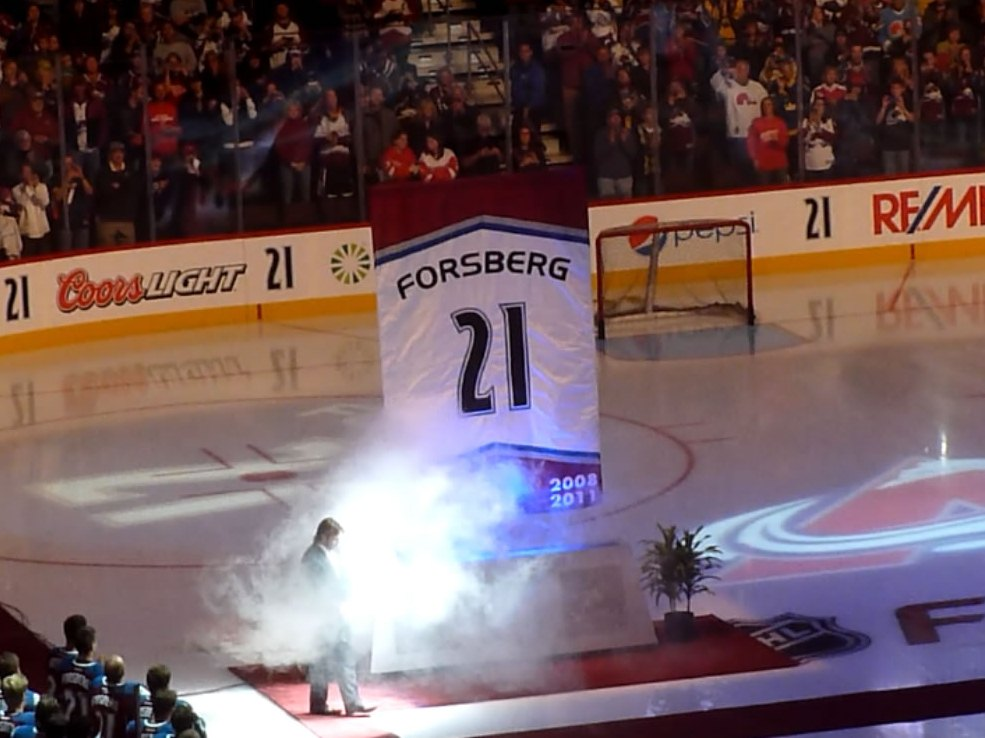
Banner for Forsberg's number 21 is raised during his number retirement ceremony with the Avalanche in 2011

On 20 April 2011, nearly two weeks after a dramatic but successful end of the 2011 Kvalserien for Modo Hockey, Forsberg was named an assistant general manager of the Modo organization, working under long-time friend Markus Näslund.

On 8 October 2011, Forsberg had his jersey number retired prior to the Avalanche's 2011–12 season opener at the Pepsi Center. On 26 February 2015, Forsberg had his number officially retired prior to a Modo game at the Fjällräven Center in his native Örnsköldsvik.

=== Business interests ===
Forsberg is involved with many business endeavors. He was an early investor in Crocs, and is a partial owner in the airline Nextjet. Forsberg and his father own a Swedish development company named Forspro Company. The company co-funded the Modo Hockey team's new Swedbank Arena in Örnsköldsvik. Independently of his father, Forsberg also owned Pforce AB, a company that imported and marketed Crocs shoes in his native Sweden since 2005. On 14 July 2010, he announced he was closing Pforce after taking heavy losses in the previous two years. Forsberg is also interested in harness racing, and owns or has owned a few racing horses during the years, including Tsar d' Inverne and Adrian Chip. He has also invested money in a golf course named Veckefjärdens Golf Club in his native Örnsköldsvik.

== International play ==
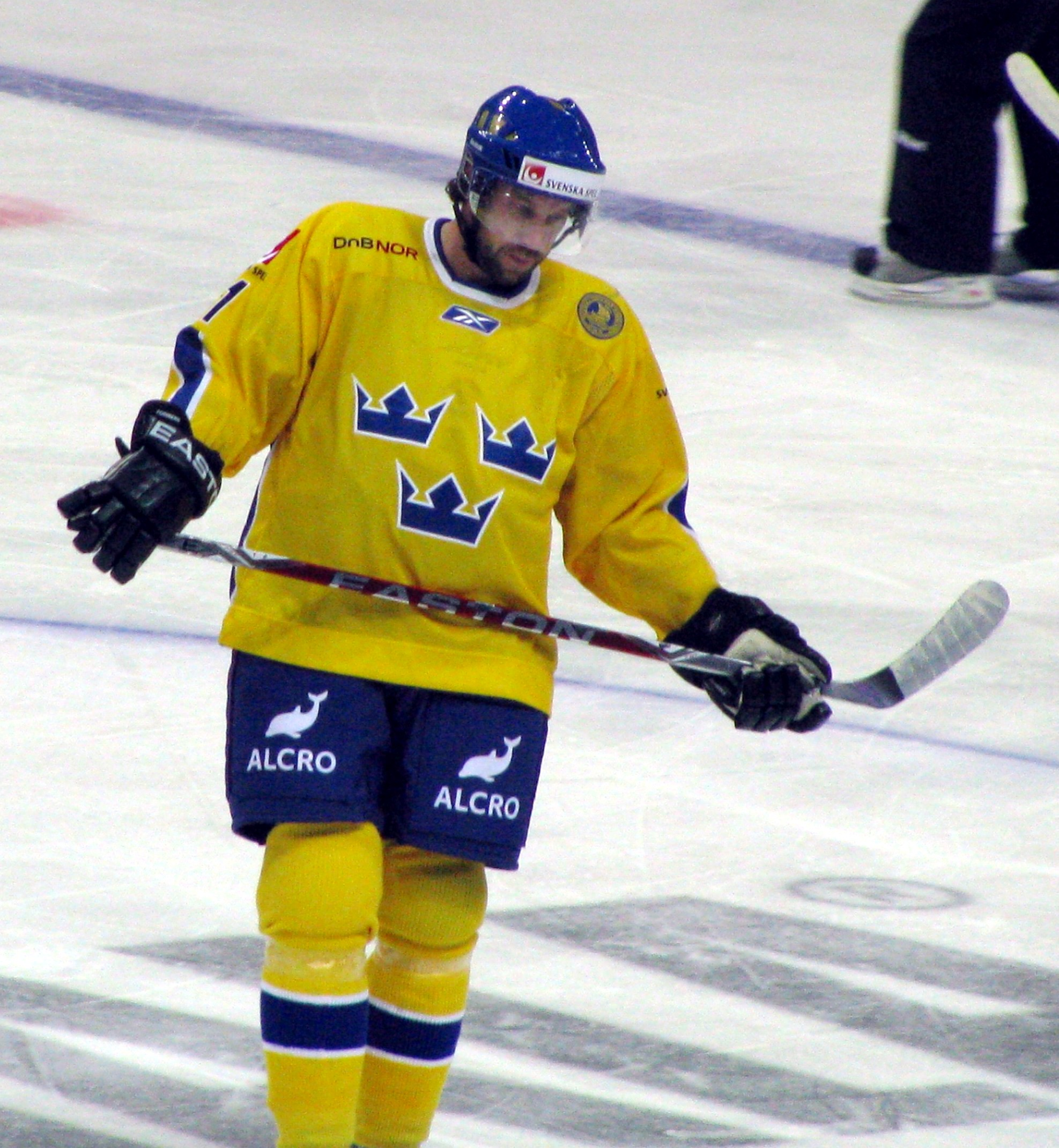

Medal record

Representing Sweden

Ice hockey

Winter Olympics
Gold medal – first place	1994 Lillehammer	
Gold medal – first place	2006 Torino	

World Championships
Gold medal – first place	1992 Czechoslovakia	
Gold medal – first place	1998 Switzerland	
Silver medal – second place	1993 Germany	
Silver medal – second place	2003 Finland	
Silver medal – second place	2004 Czech Republic	

World Junior Championships
Silver medal – second place	1992 Germany	
Silver medal – second place	1993 Sweden	

Forsberg competed with Sweden's under-18 team at the 1991 European Junior Championships. He led the tournament in scoring with 17 points over six games as Sweden failed to defend their gold medal from the previous year. Moving on to Sweden's national under-20 team, he played in his first of two World Junior Championships in 1992. He scored 11 points in seven games as Sweden won the silver medal. Several months later, Forsberg debuted with the Swedish men's team at the 1992 World Championships. He recorded a goal and an assist over eight games, helping Sweden to a gold medal.

The following year, he made his second appearance at the 1993 World Junior Championships. Forsberg set a tournament record 24 assists and 31 points over seven games. He earned nearly a third of his points with a ten-point performance against Japan, which set a single-game tournament record. Due to his record-breaking performances at the World Junior Hockey Championship, Forsberg was deemed the best player in World Junior history by TSN, topping players the likes of Pavel Bure, Viacheslav Fetisov, Wayne Gretzky, and Jordan Eberle, who were among the top five players in the vote. In 1994, he led the Swedes to a gold medal in the Winter Olympics, scoring the winning goal of the penalty shootout that decided the gold medal game. Forsberg's "one hand, slide in" goal, a move which he borrowed from retired Swedish ice hockey player Kent Nilsson, has become popular in today's NHL. An image of Forsberg scoring this goal was later placed on a Swedish postage stamp, making him the first hockey player to be placed on a Swedish stamp. Forsberg's famous move on Canadian goaltender Corey Hirsch (who refused to allow his name to be shown on the stamp) has become so iconic in hockey that efforts to reproduce it inevitably draw references to Forsberg from hockey commentators.

Following his second year in the NHL, Forsberg competed in the 1996 World Cup. The competition marked Forsberg's first time in best-on-best international play. With five points in four games, Forsberg helped Sweden to a bronze medal.

In October 1997, it was announced that Forsberg would be playing for the Swedish national team in the Karjala Cup, though he was forced to withdraw from the team after just one practice session after experiencing continued problems with his foot. The following year, he competed in the 1998 Winter Olympics in Nagano, Japan, in the first Olympic competition including NHL players. Forsberg recorded five points over four games as Sweden finished without a medal at fifth place. Several months later, competing in the 1998 World Championships, Sweden won a gold medal. Forsberg had recorded 11 points over seven games.

In November 1999, Forsberg played for Sweden in the Karjala Cup, a tournament that included his 100th game for the Swedish national team against Russia on 7 November. Nearly five years later, he made his fourth World Championships appearance in 2003. He scored nine points in eight games to help Sweden to a silver medal. The following year, he helped Sweden to another silver medal at the 2004 tournament, recording an assist in two games.

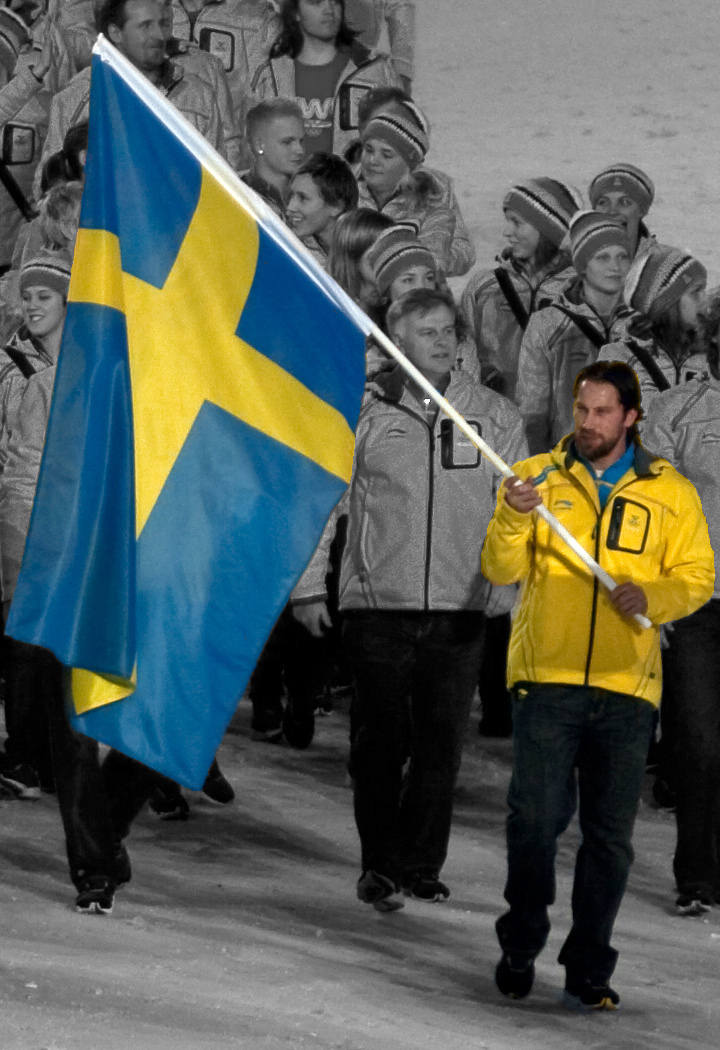
The athletes from Sweden entering the stadium at the opening ceremonies of the 2010 Winter Olympics, led by flag-bearer Peter Forsberg.

Returning to best-on-best competition at the 2004 World Cup, Forsberg recorded three points in four games. Sweden finished in fifth place. Two years later, he won his second Olympic gold, helping Sweden to a championship at the 2006 Games in Turin, Italy. As part of a subsequent interview about the championship over five years later, Forsberg was interpreted to insinuate that Sweden lost their preliminary round game against Slovakia on purpose, so as to draw Switzerland as their quarterfinal opponent, rather than Canada or Russia. Swedish forward Henrik Sedin, who played alongside Forsberg on the 2006 team denied the notion while adding that Forsberg's comments in the interview were misconstrued. Forsberg's next appearance in international competition came at the 2010 Winter Olympics in Vancouver, British Columbia. He was named Sweden's flag bearer for the opening ceremonies. Two years removed from NHL competition (Forsberg had been playing in the Elitserien while attempting an NHL comeback), Forsberg played a lesser role with the Swedish team and recorded an assist over four games. Sweden finished in fifth place, failing to defend their 2006 gold medal.

== Style of play ==
"He's such an unselfish player. He's one of those players who would rather make a pretty play and feed somebody else for the goal than score himself."

— Former coach Marc Crawford

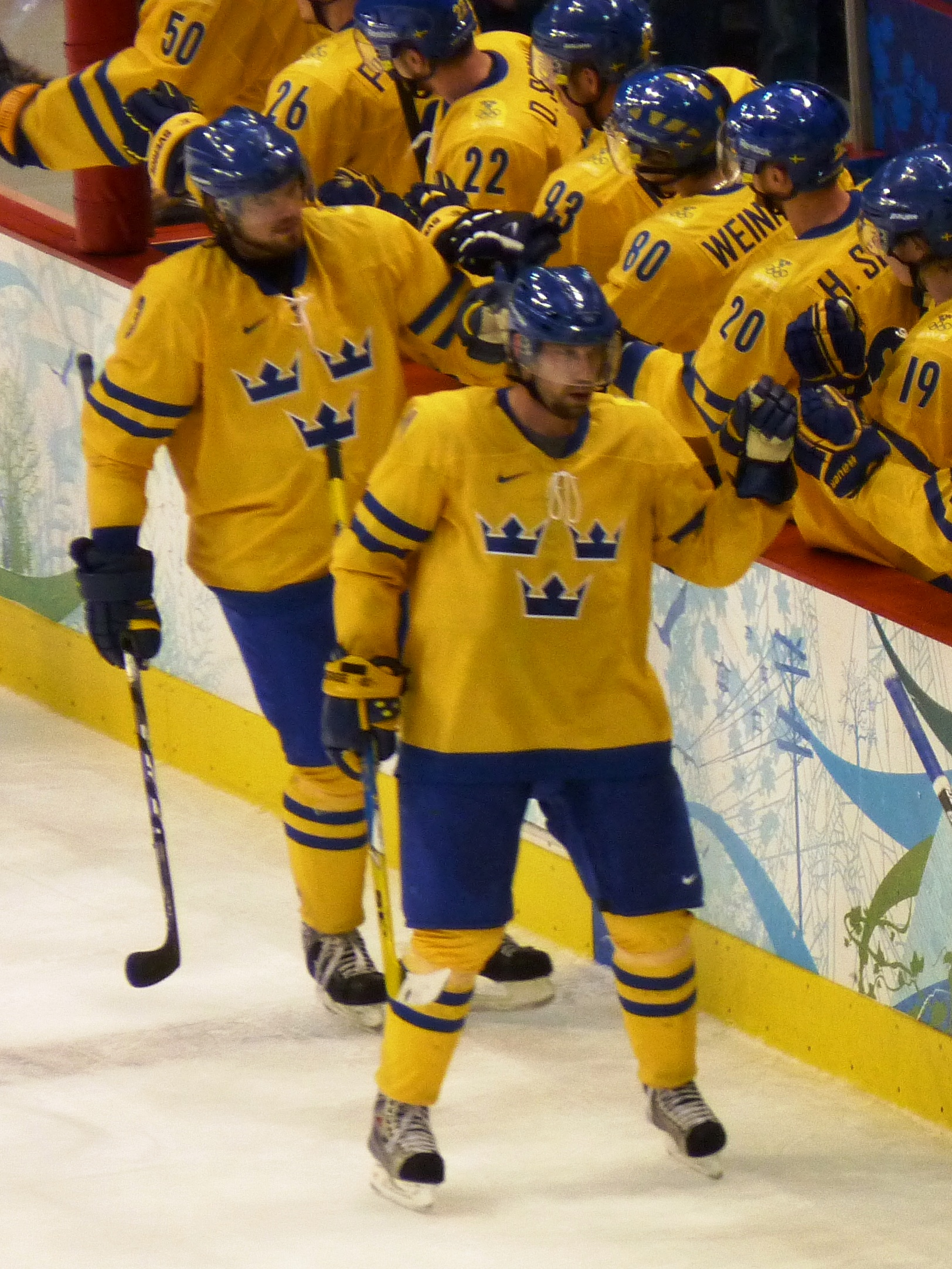
Forsberg (centre foreground) celebrates with teammates after recording an assist

Peter Forsberg was a "superstar" forward, with "outstanding" playmaking skills and "great vision" who "possesse[d] an excellent combination of skill and physical play". In the prime of his career, he was considered by many as the best two-way player in the world. Capable of combining physical play and hitting with skill, he was also acclaimed for being responsible offensively and defensively. Said to have a "Wayne Gretzky-like" passing touch, he has been complimented by journalists and players for making the players around him better. Because of his physicality on the ice, he has been credited with helping to change the perception that Swedish hockey players were not tough.

=== Injury proneness ===
Forsberg's style of play led him to deal with several severe injuries. It has been said in the press that he was injury-prone because he did not soften his game as he got older. In his 14 seasons as an NHL player, Forsberg missed an entire regular season and played in less than 90% of regular-season games in eight other seasons.

The first season in which he missed a significant part was 1996–97. Due to a bruised thigh, Forsberg was out on 14 regular season games and three playoff games. In the off season before the 1999–2000 season, Forsberg underwent shoulder surgery and missed the first 23 games of the season. He missed an extra 10 games due to shoulder injuries, a concussion and a hip pointer. After missing eight games due to a rib injury in the 2000–01 regular season, Forsberg suffered a severe injury in the playoffs. After the last game of the conference semifinal against the Los Angeles Kings on 9 May 2001, he underwent surgery to remove a ruptured spleen and it was announced that he would not play until the following season. In the beginning of the 2001–02 season, he took a leave of absence to heal his injuries. In January 2002, the Colorado Avalanche held a press conference but instead of announcing the expected return of Forsberg, announced that he had been submitted to reconstructive surgery on the peroneal tendons of his left foot (Forsberg would return for the playoffs that season, but foot problems would plague Forsberg for the rest of his career and eventually end it). In 2003–04 season, he missed 43 games: 19 with a groin and abdominal injury

During the lockout, while playing for Modo Hockey, Forsberg had surgery after dislocating his left wrist and breaking a bone in his hand, and because of a bursa sac removal.

== Personal life ==
Philanthropically, Forsberg and childhood friend Markus Näslund founded Icebreakers, an organization that brings together professional ice hockey players for exhibition games to raise money for charities.

In late 2010, Forsberg became engaged to fellow Swede Nicole Nordin in Paris. In June 2012, the couple had their first child, a son. In September 2014, their second child, a daughter, was born. In May 2016 they had their third child. The family resided in Zug, Switzerland from 2018. On May 1, 2023, the couple announced their separation through a post on Peter's Instagram account.

== Career statistics ==
=== Regular season and playoffs ===
			Regular season					Playoffs
Season	Team	League	GP	G	A	Pts	PIM	GP	G	A	Pts	PIM
1989–90	Modo Hockey	SWE U20	30	15	12	27	42	—	—	—	—	—
1989–90	Modo Hockey	Allsv	1	0	1	1	4	—	—	—	—	—
1990–91	Modo Hockey	SWE U20	39	38	64	102	56	—	—	—	—	—
1990–91	Modo Hockey	SEL	23	7	10	17	22	—	—	—	—	—
1991–92	Modo Hockey	SEL	39	9	18	28	78	—	—	—	—	—
1992–93	Modo Hockey	SWE U20	2	0	3	3	4	—	—	—	—	—
1992–93	Modo Hockey	SEL	39	23	24	47	92	3	4	1	5	0
1993–94	Modo Hockey	SEL	39	18	26	44	82	11	9	7	16	14
1994–95	Modo Hockey	SEL	11	5	9	14	20	—	—	—	—	—
1994–95	Quebec Nordiques	NHL	47	15	35	50	16	6	2	4	6	4
1995–96	Colorado Avalanche	NHL	82	30	86	116	47	22	10	11	21	18
1996–97	Colorado Avalanche	NHL	65	28	58	86	73	14	5	12	17	10
1997–98	Colorado Avalanche	NHL	72	25	66	91	94	7	6	5	11	12
1998–99	Colorado Avalanche	NHL	78	30	67	97	108	19	8	16	24	31
1999–00	Colorado Avalanche	NHL	49	14	37	51	52	16	7	8	15	12
2000–01	Colorado Avalanche	NHL	73	27	62	89	54	11	4	10	14	6
2001–02	Colorado Avalanche	NHL	—	—	—	—	—	20	9	18	27	20
2002–03	Colorado Avalanche	NHL	75	29	77	106	70	7	2	6	8	6
2003–04	Colorado Avalanche	NHL	39	18	37	55	30	11	4	7	11	12
2004–05	Modo Hockey	SEL	33	13	26	39	88	1	0	0	0	2
2005–06	Philadelphia Flyers	NHL	60	19	56	75	46	6	4	4	8	6
2006–07	Philadelphia Flyers	NHL	40	11	29	40	72	—	—	—	—	—
2006–07	Nashville Predators	NHL	17	2	13	15	16	5	2	2	4	12
2007–08	Colorado Avalanche	NHL	9	1	13	14	8	7	1	4	5	14
2008–09	Modo Hockey	SEL	3	1	2	3	0	—	—	—	—	—
2009–10	Modo Hockey	SEL	23	11	19	30	66	—	—	—	—	—
2010–11	Colorado Avalanche	NHL	2	0	0	0	4	—	—	—	—	—
NHL totals			708	249	636	885	690	151	64	107	171	163
SEL totals			214	88	137	225	452	15	13	8	21	16

=== International ===
Year	Team	Event	Result	GP	G	A	Pts	PIM
1991	Sweden	EJC	4th	6	5	12	17	16
1992	Sweden	WJC	2nd place, silver medalist(s)	7	3	8	11	30
1992	Sweden	WC	1st place, gold medalist(s)	8	4	2	6	6
1993	Sweden	WJC	2nd place, silver medalist(s)	7	7	24	31	8
1993	Sweden	WC	2nd place, silver medalist(s)	8	1	1	2	12
1994	Sweden	OG	1st place, gold medalist(s)	8	1	6	7	6
1996	Sweden	WCH	SF	4	1	4	5	6
1998	Sweden	OG	5th	4	1	4	5	6
1998	Sweden	WC	1st place, gold medalist(s)	7	6	5	11	0
2003	Sweden	WC	2nd place, silver medalist(s)	8	4	5	9	6
2004	Sweden	WC	2nd place, silver medalist(s)	2	0	1	1	2
2004	Sweden	WCH	QF	4	1	2	3	0
2006	Sweden	OG	1st place, gold medalist(s)	6	0	6	6	0
2010	Sweden	OG	5th	4	0	1	1	2
Junior totals				20	15	44	59	54
Senior totals				63	19	38	56	46

=== All-Star Games ===
Year	Location	G	A	Pts
1996	Boston	0	0	0
1997	San Jose	—	—	—
1998	Vancouver	0	1	1
1999	Tampa Bay	0	0	0
2000	Toronto	—	—	—
2001	Denver	1	2	3
2003	Florida	1	0	1
All-Star totals		2	3	5

== Career achievements ==
=== Awards ===
==== NHL ====
Award	Year(s)
Calder Memorial Trophy	1995
NHL All-Rookie Team	1995
Stanley Cup champion	1996, 2001
NHL first All-Star team	1998, 1999, 2003
Art Ross Trophy	2003
Bud Light Plus/Minus Award (shared with Milan Hejduk)	2003
Hart Memorial Trophy	2003

==== Elitserien ====
Award	Year(s)
Guldpucken	1993, 1994
Guldhjälmen	1993, 1994

==== International ====
Award	Year(s)
World Junior Championship A – All-Star team	1993
World Junior Championship A – Best Forward	1993
World Championship A – All-Star team	1998
World Championship A – Best Forward	1998
IIHF Hall of Fame	2013

==== Other awards ====
Award	Year(s)
Viking Award	1996, 1998, 1999
Yanick Dupre Memorial	2006
Stora Grabbars Märke	2009

=== Records ===
- Forsberg set an all-time tournament record at the 1993 World Junior Championships with 31 points in only seven games. Also, he ranks first in career points among tournament scorers with 42 points (10 goals and 32 assists).
- With his second Olympic Gold in 2006, he became the third player in history to have enough titles to be a member of the Triple Gold Club twice (the others being Viacheslav Fetisov and Igor Larionov).
- As of 1 October 2016, Forsberg stands eighth in NHL all-time points-per-game, with 1.25 points-per-game in his career.
- He is ranked fourth all-time in NHL career assists-per-game with 0.898, behind only Wayne Gretzky, Mario Lemieux and Bobby Orr.

Awards information taken from NHL.com.

Awards and achievements
Preceded by Mike Ricci	Philadelphia Flyers first-round draft pick 1991	Succeeded by Ryan Sittler
Preceded by Tommy Sjödin	Golden Puck; 1993, 1994	Succeeded by Tomas Jonsson
Preceded by Martin Brodeur	Winner of the Calder Memorial Trophy; 1995	Succeeded by Daniel Alfredsson
Preceded by Mikael Renberg; Mats Sundin	Winner of the Viking Award; 1996; 1998, 1999	Succeeded by Mats Sundin; Nicklas Lidström
Preceded by Chris Chelios	Co-winner of the NHL Plus/Minus Award; 2003; With: Milan Hejduk	Succeeded by Martin St. Louis and Marek Malík
Preceded by José Théodore	Winner of the Hart Memorial Trophy; 2003	Succeeded by Martin St. Louis
Preceded by Jarome Iginla	Winner of the Art Ross Trophy; 2003	Succeeded by Martin St. Louis
Sporting positions
Preceded by Keith Primeau; Derian Hatcher^{*}	Philadelphia Flyers captain 2006–07	Succeeded by Jason Smith
Olympic Games
Preceded by Anja Pärson	Flagbearer for Sweden; Vancouver 2010	Succeeded by Anders Södergren
