= Saint-Julien-près-Bort =

- Part of Sarroux-Saint Julien
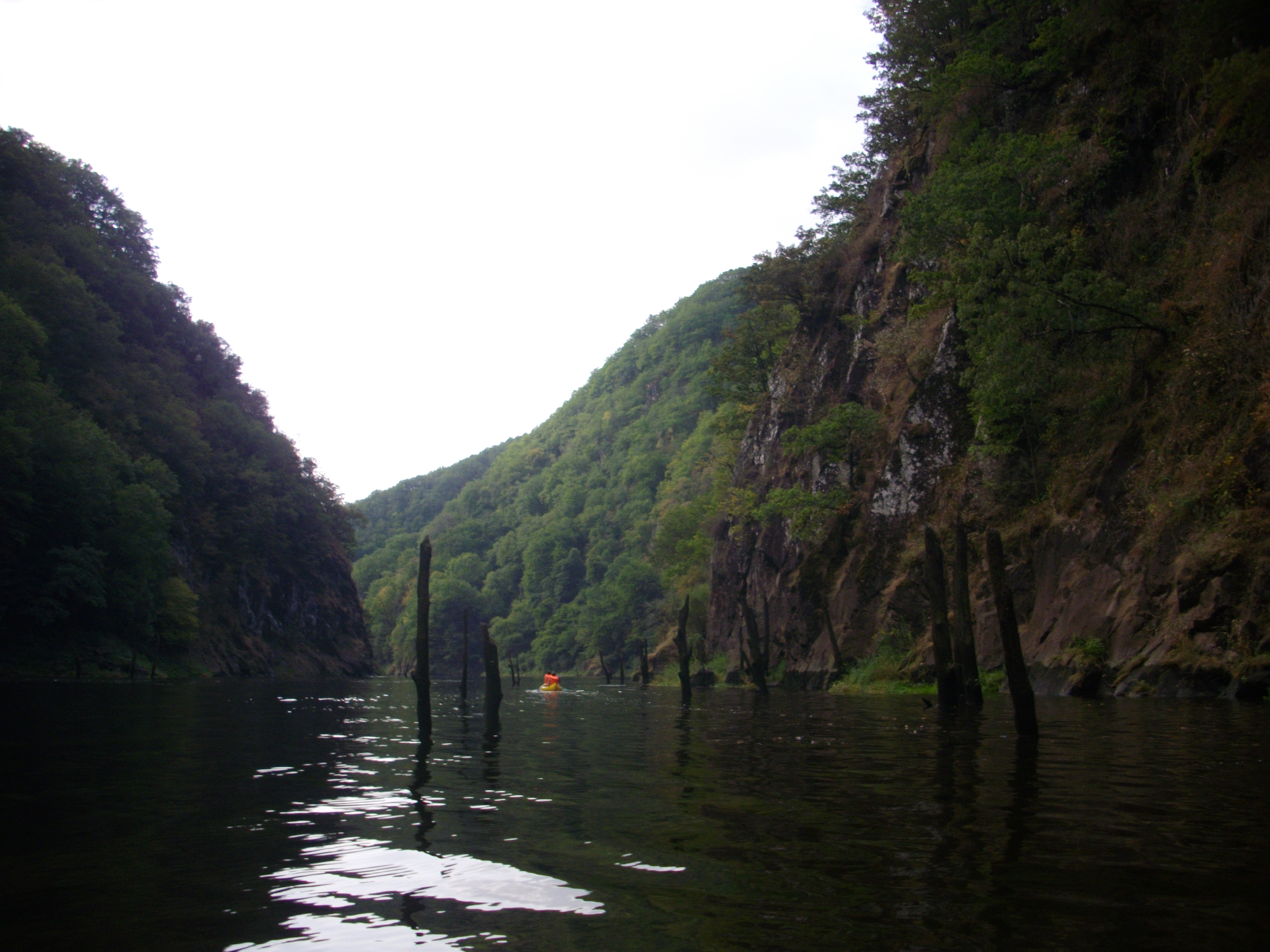
- The Dordogne

- Coat of arms
- Location of Saint-Julien-près-Bort
- Location within France Location within Nouvelle-Aquitaine
- Coordinates: 45°24′59″N 2°24′15″E
- Country: France
- Region: Nouvelle-Aquitaine
- Department: Corrèze
- Arrondissement: Ussel
- Canton: Haute-Dordogne
- Commune: Sarroux-Saint Julien
- Area^{1}: 30.63 km^{2} (11.83 sq mi)
- Highest elevation: 841 m (2,759 ft)
- Lowest elevation: 400 m (1,300 ft)
- Population (2019): 401
  - Density: 13.1/km^{2} (33.9/sq mi)
- Time zone: UTC+01:00 (CET)
  - Summer (DST): UTC+02:00 (CEST)
- Postal code: 19110
- ^{1} French Land Register data, which excludes lakes, ponds, glaciers > 1 km^{2} (0.386 sq mi or 247 acres) and river estuaries.

Saint-Julien-près-Bort (French pronunciation: [sɛ̃ ʒyljɛ̃ pʁɛ bɔʁ], literally Saint-Julien near Bort; Occitan: Sent Julian de Baurt) is a former commune situated in the Corrèze department, Central France. On 1 January 2017, it was merged into the new commune Sarroux-Saint Julien.

== Geography ==
The river Diège forms all of the commune's western boundary, then flows into the Dordogne, which forms all of its southern boundary.

== See also ==
- Communes of the Corrèze department
