= Sarroux-Saint Julien =

- Commune
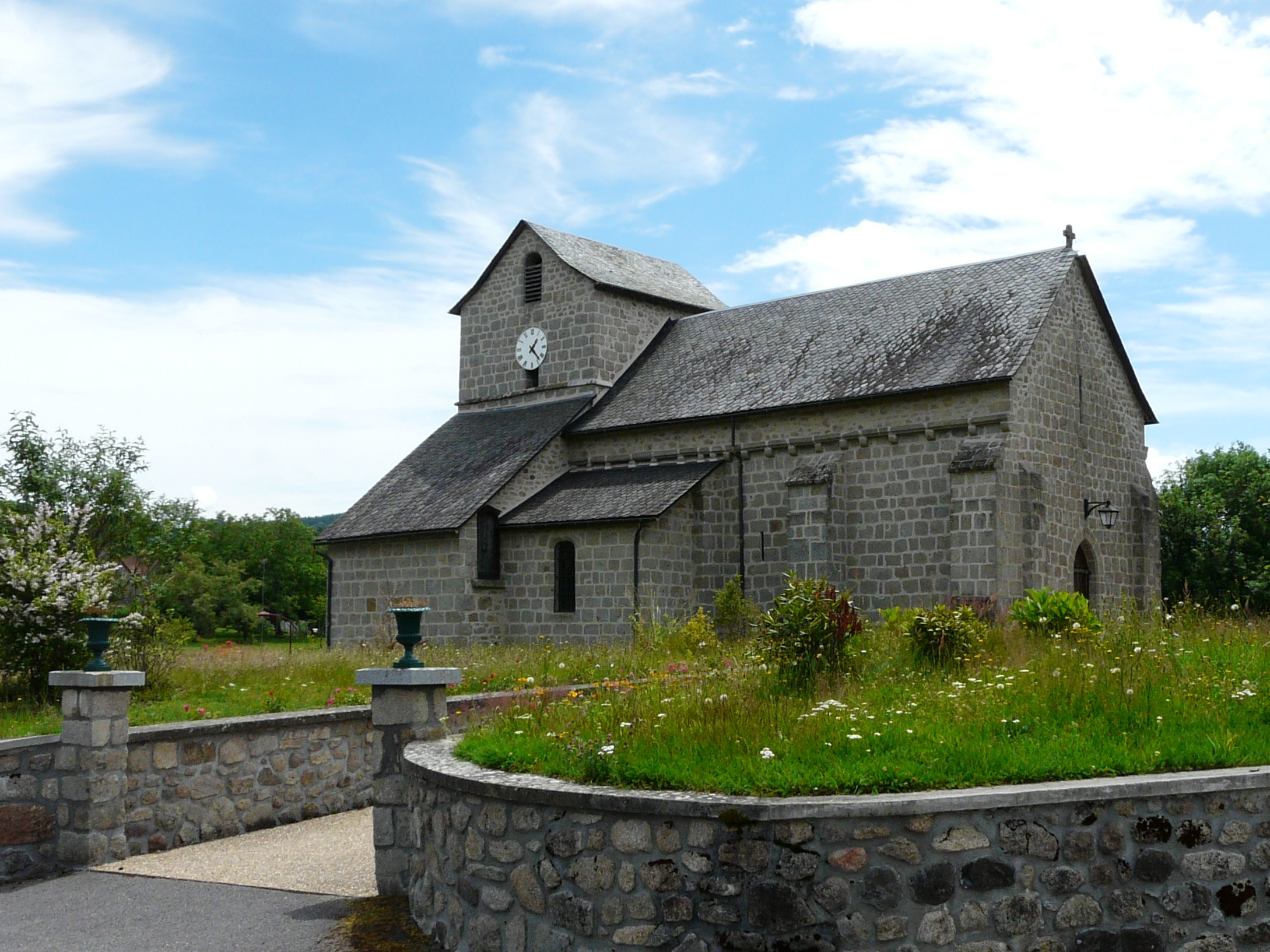
- The church in Sarroux

- Coat of arms
- Location of Sarroux-Saint Julien
- Location within France Location within Nouvelle-Aquitaine
- Coordinates: 45°24′50″N 2°25′55″E
- Country: France
- Region: Nouvelle-Aquitaine
- Department: Corrèze
- Arrondissement: Ussel
- Canton: Haute-Dordogne
- Intercommunality: Haute-Corrèze Communauté

Government
  - Mayor (2024–2026): Jean-Paul Alphonsout
- Area^{1}: 54.39 km^{2} (21.00 sq mi)
- Population (2023): 866
  - Density: 15.9/km^{2} (41.2/sq mi)
- Time zone: UTC+01:00 (CET)
  - Summer (DST): UTC+02:00 (CEST)
- INSEE/Postal code: 19252 /19110
- ^{1} French Land Register data, which excludes lakes, ponds, glaciers > 1 km^{2} (0.386 sq mi or 247 acres) and river estuaries.

Sarroux-Saint Julien (French pronunciation: [saʁu sɛ̃ ʒyljɛ̃]; Occitan: Sarron e Sent Julian) is a commune in the department of Corrèze, south-central France. The municipality was established on 1 January 2017 by merger of the former communes of Sarroux (the seat) and Saint-Julien-près-Bort.

== See also ==
- Communes of the Corrèze department
