= Leif Knudtzon =

Norwegian modern pentathlete (1895–1925)

Personal information
- Born: 23 December 1895 Oslo, Norway
- Died: 16 July 1925 (aged 29) Kristiansand, Norway

Sport
- Sport: Modern pentathlon

Leif Knudtzon (23 December 1895 – 16 July 1925) was a Norwegian modern pentathlete. He competed at the 1924 Summer Olympics. Knudtzon died in a plane crash in Kristiansand in 1925.
