= Jules Hulsmans =

Belgian modern pentathlete

Personal information
- Born: 29 September 1898

Sport
- Sport: Modern pentathlon

Jules Hulsmans (born 29 September 1898, date of death unknown) was a Belgian modern pentathlete. He competed at the 1924 Summer Olympics.
