= Frederick Pitts =

American modern pentathlete

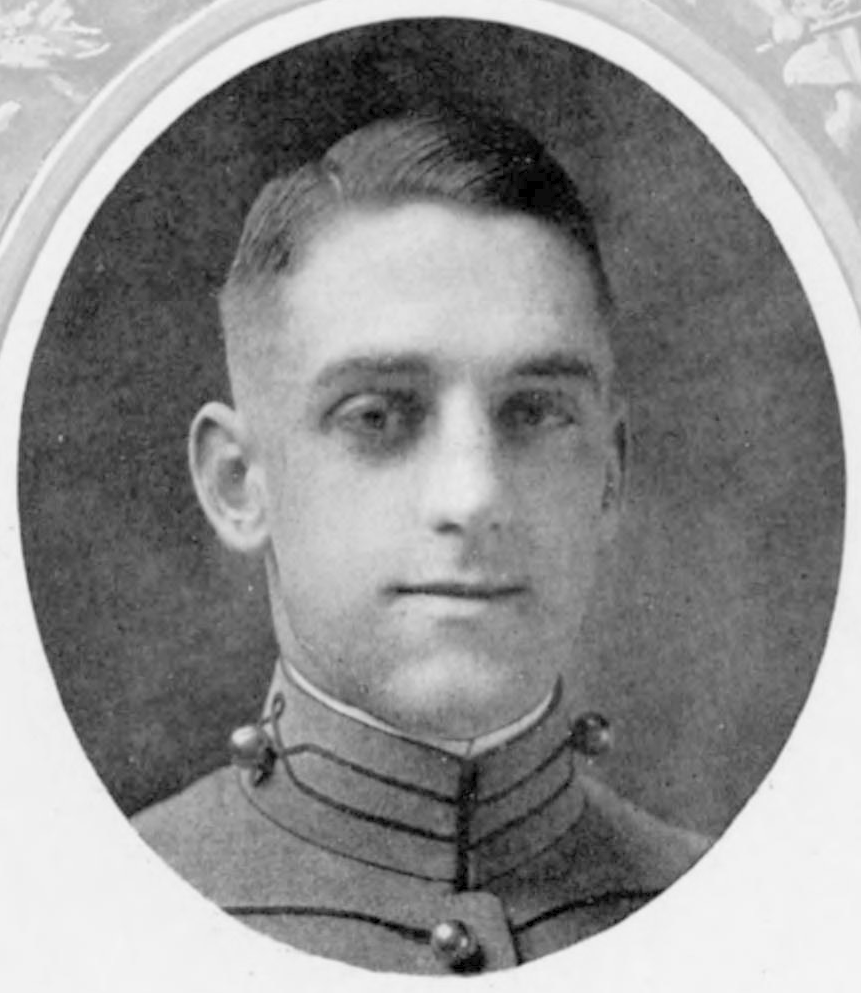
- At West Point in 1920

Personal information
- Full name: Frederick Robert Pitts
- Born: October 23, 1898 Philadelphia, Pennsylvania, United States
- Died: October 19, 1988 (aged 89) Winter Park, Florida, United States

Sport
- Sport: Modern pentathlon

Frederick Robert Pitts (October 23, 1898 – October 19, 1988) was an American modern pentathlete. He competed at the 1924 Summer Olympics.

== Biography ==
Frederick Pitts was born in Philadelphia on October 23, 1898.

He graduated from the United States Military Academy at West Point in 1920, and was commissioned as a 2nd lieutenant of cavalry. He would go on to attain the rank of colonel.

He died in Winter Park, Florida on October 19, 1988, and was buried at Arlington National Cemetery.
