= Donald Scott (middle-distance runner) =

American athlete

Personal information
- Born: November 5, 1894 Woodville, Mississippi, United States
- Died: October 8, 1988 (aged 93) San Antonio, Texas, United States

Sport
- Sport: Middle-distance running, modern pentathlon

Donald Magruder Scott (November 5, 1894 – October 8, 1980) was an American middle-distance runner and modern pentathlete. He competed in the 800 metres at the 1920 Summer Olympics and the modern pentathlon at the 1924 Summer Olympics.
