= Emil Hagelberg =

Finnish modern pentathlete

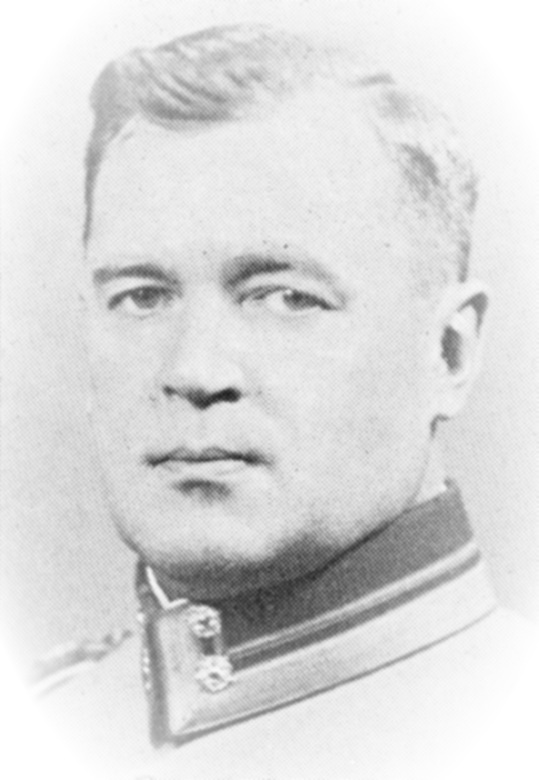
- Hagelberg in 1938

Personal information
- Full name: Emil Alfons Hagelberg
- Born: 25 August 1895 Pyhtää, Finland
- Died: 12 August 1941 (aged 45) Varloi, Kareliya, Russia

Sport
- Sport: Modern pentathlon

Emil Alfons Hagelberg (25 August 1895 – 12 August 1941) was a Finnish modern pentathlete. He competed at the 1920 and 1924 Summer Olympics and placed seventh and 25th, respectively. He served as the Olympic flag bearer for Finland in 1920.

Hagelberg was a career military officer who fought in World War I and the Finnish Civil War, on the side of the Whites. He died in a Soviet air raid during the Continuation War in 1941.
