= Zenon Małłysko =

Polish modern pentathlete

Personal information
- Born: 16 February 1898 Opole, Poland
- Died: 20 April 1957 (aged 59) Edinburgh, Scotland

Sport
- Sport: Modern pentathlon

Zenon Małłysko (16 February 1898 – 20 April 1957) was a Polish modern pentathlete. He competed at the 1928 Summer Olympics.
