= Carolus Stoffels =

Dutch modern pentathlete

Personal information
- Born: 4 October 1893 The Hague, Netherlands
- Died: 21 October 1957 (aged 64) Bussum, Netherlands

Sport
- Sport: Modern pentathlon

Carolus Stoffels (4 October 1893 – 21 October 1957) was a Dutch modern pentathlete. He competed at the 1924 Summer Olympics.
