= Marius Christensen =

Danish modern pentathlete

Personal information
- Born: 20 November 1889 Vejle, Denmark
- Died: 31 October 1964 (aged 74) Ringsted, Denmark

Sport
- Sport: Modern pentathlon

Marius Christensen (20 November 1889 – 31 October 1964) was a Danish modern pentathlete. He competed at the 1920 and 1924 Summer Olympics.
