= Giuseppe Micheli (pentathlete) =

Italian modern pentathlete

Personal information
- Born: 1888
- Died: Unknown

Sport
- Sport: Modern pentathlon

Giuseppe Micheli (born 1888, date of death unknown) was an Italian modern pentathlete. He competed at the 1924 Summer Olympics.
