= Olliver Smith =

Norwegian modern pentathlete

Personal information
- Born: 5 December 1898 Oslo, Norway
- Died: 17 July 1965 (aged 66) Oslo, Norway

Sport
- Sport: Modern pentathlon

Olliver Smith (5 December 1898 – 17 July 1965) was a Norwegian modern pentathlete. He competed at the 1920 and 1924 Summer Olympics.
