= Raoul Lignon =

French modern pentathlete

Personal information
- Full name: Raoul Jean Marius Lignon
- Nationality: francaise
- Born: 29 September 1894 Sète, 34200, Hérault, Languedoc-roussillon, France
- Died: 16 April 1973 (aged 78) Marssac sur tarn, tarn, Midi-Pyrenée

Sport
- Sport: Modern pentathlon

Raoul Lignon (29 September 1894 – 16 April 1973) was a French modern pentathlete. He competed at the 1924 Summer Olympics. A career officer, Lignon served as a lieutenant in the 256th Field Artillery Regiment during World War I, where he distinguished himself in actions cited in army orders (Order No. 21 of 18 December 1918).

He later continued his military career and was promoted to captain. During the Paris 1924 Olympic Games, he was still serving in the French Army.

He was awarded the Croix de Guerre 1914–1918 and was made a Knight of the Legion of Honour in 1935.
