= Omero Chiesa =

Italian modern pentathlete

Personal information
- Born: 20 December 1893 Rome, Italy
- Died: Unknown

Sport
- Sport: Modern pentathlon

Omero Chiesa (born 20 December 1893, date of death unknown) was an Italian modern pentathlete. He competed at the 1924 Summer Olympics.
