= Ernesto Corradi =

Italian modern pentathlete

Personal information
- Born: 1893
- Died: Unknown

Sport
- Sport: Modern pentathlon

Ernesto Corradi (born 1893, date of death unknown) was an Italian modern pentathlete. He competed at the 1924 Summer Olympics.

== Biography ==
Born in 1893, at the age of 31 he participated in the 1924 Summer Olympic Games in Paris, finishing 30th in the individual competition with 127.5 points (26th in shooting, 22nd in Equitation, 26th in fencing, 22nd in horse riding, and 31st in running).
