= Jacques De Wykerslooth De Rooyesteyn =

Belgian modern pentathlete (1896–1988)

Personal information
- Born: 8 July 1896 Brussels, Belgium
- Died: 19 July 1988 (aged 92) Luxembourg, Belgium

Sport
- Sport: Modern pentathlon

Jacques De Wykerslooth De Rooyesteyn (8 July 1896 – 19 July 1988) was a Belgian modern pentathlete. He competed at the 1924 Summer Olympics.
