= Guillaume de Tournemire =

French modern pentathlete

Personal information
- Born: 18 July 1901 Tours, France
- Died: 16 August 1970 (aged 69) Sarroux, France

Sport
- Sport: Modern pentathlon

Guillaume de Tournemire (18 July 1901 – 16 August 1970) was a French modern pentathlete. He competed at the 1924 Summer Olympics.
