= Karel John van den Brandeler =

Dutch modern pentathlete, fencer

Personal information
- Born: 13 March 1888 The Hague, Netherlands
- Died: 11 December 1948 (aged 60) Loenen, Netherlands

Sport
- Sport: Modern pentathlon, fencing

Karel John van den Brandeler (13 March 1888 – 11 December 1948) was a Dutch modern pentathlete and fencer. He competed at the 1924 and 1928 Summer Olympics.
