= George Bare =

American modern pentathlete (1899–1981)

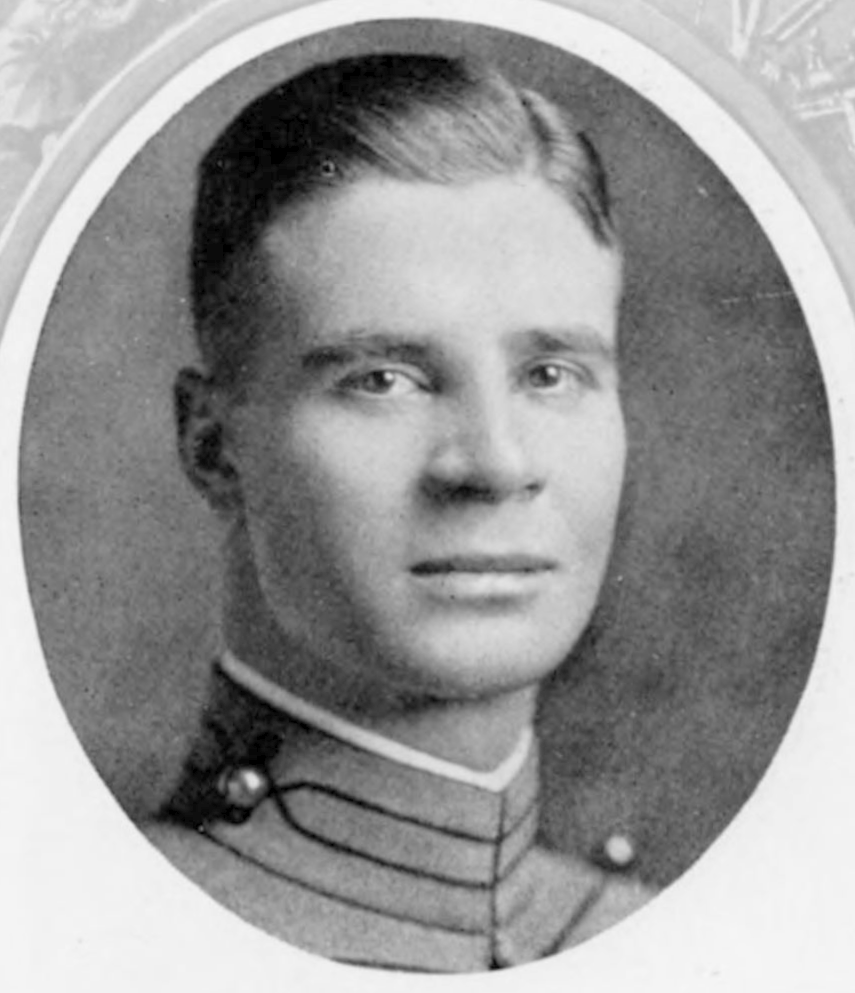
- At West Point in 1920

Personal information
- Born: January 5, 1899 Sardinia, Ohio, United States
- Died: May 26, 1981 (aged 82) Tacoma, Washington, United States

Sport
- Sport: Modern pentathlon

George Huston Bare (January 5, 1899 – May 26, 1981) was an American modern pentathlete. He competed at the 1924 Summer Olympics.

== Biography ==
George Bare was born in Sardinia, Ohio on January 5, 1899. He graduated from the United States Military Academy at West Point in 1920.

He served in the United States Army for 33 years, attaining the rank of colonel. After retiring, he worked as an insurance broker.

He died in Tacoma, Washington on May 26, 1981.
