= Carl Årmann =

Swedish army officer and pentathlete

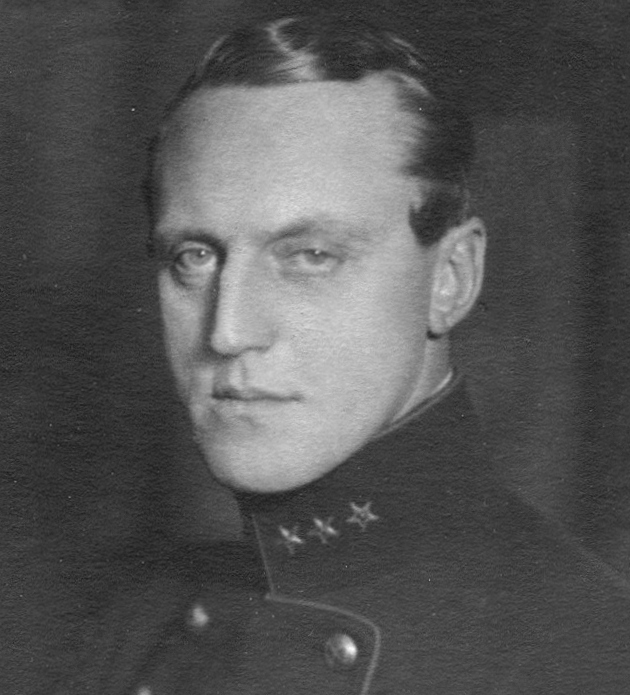
- Årmann as captain
- Born: Carl Nils Gabriel Årmann; 24 August 1894; Stora Mellösa, Sweden
- Died: 21 April 1988 (aged 93); Stockholm, Sweden
- Military career
- Allegiance: Sweden
- Branch: Swedish Army
- Service years: 1915–1960
- Rank: Lieutenant General
- Commands: Artillery and Engineering College; Norrland Artillery Regiment; Bergslagen Artillery Regiment; III Military District; Military Office of the Ministry of Defence
- Other work: War Materials Inspector

Lieutenant General Carl Nils Gabriel Årmann (24 August 1894 – 21 April 1988) was a senior Swedish Army officer. Årmann began his military career as a second lieutenant in 1915 and later attended the Artillery and Engineering College from 1918 to 1920. He held various ranks, including captain and major of the General Staff, before becoming a colonel in 1941. He assumed leadership roles at different artillery regiments and institutions. In 1950, he became a major general and served as the Chief of the Military Office of the Ministry of Defence until his retirement in 1960. He continued to contribute to the military as War Materials Inspector and head of the National Swedish War Materials Inspectorate from 1960 to 1964.

== Early life ==
Årmann was born on 24 August 1894 in Stora Mellösa, Sweden, the son of estate owner Nils Årmann and his wife Alva (née Lange). He passed studentexamen in Örebro in 1913.

== Career ==
=== Military career ===
Årmann was commissioned as an officer in 1915 with the rank of second lieutenant and was assigned to Uppland Artillery Regiment (A 5). He completed the higher course at the Artillery and Engineering College from 1918 to 1920 and was captain of the General Staff in 1926. Årmann was teacher at the Artillery and Engineering College from 1928 to 1934 and served in Uppland Artillery Regiment (A 5) in 1934.

He was major of the General Staff in 1936 and was promoted to lieutenant colonel in 1939 and served in Uppland Artillery Regiment (A 5) in 1940. Årmann was promoted to colonel in 1941 and was appointed head of the Artillery and Engineering College in 1941 and commander of the Norrland Artillery Regiment (A 4) in 1942 and the Bergslagen Artillery Regiment (A 9) in 1943.

Årmann was military commander of the III Military District in 1950 (acting in 1946) and was promoted to major general in 1950. He was then the Chief of the Military Office of the Ministry of Defence from 1951 to 1960 when he retired from active service and was promoted to lieutenant general in the reserve. Årmann then served as War Materials Inspector and head of the National Swedish War Materials Inspectorate at the Ministry of Commerce and Industry from 1960 to 1964.

=== Sports career ===
Årmann was a modern pentathlete and competed at the 1924 Summer Olympics and finished tenth.

=== Other work ===
Årmann became chairman of the Skövde Flying Club in 1946 and of the Skövde department of the Society for the Promotion of Ski Sport and Open Air Life (Skid- och friluftsfrämjandet) in 1946. He was a member of the Enrollment Council (Inskrivningsrådet) in 1955.

== Personal life ==
In 1926, Årmann married Brita Flach (born 1902), the daughter of estate owner Erik Flach and Tyra (née Schubert). Årmann was the father of Jan (born 1928) and Christina (born 1931).

== Dates of rank ==
- 1915 – Second lieutenant
- 1917 – Underlöjtnant
- 1918 – Lieutenant
- 1926 – Captain
- 1936 – Major
- 1939 – Lieutenant colonel
- 1941 – Colonel
- 1950 – Major general
- 1960 – Lieutenant general

== Awards and decorations ==
=== Swedish ===
- (Sweden) Commander Grand Cross of the Order of the Sword (11 November 1957)
- (Sweden) Commander 1st Class of the Order of the Sword (15 November 1947)
- (Sweden) Commander of the Order of the Sword (15 November 1945)
- (Sweden) Knight 1st Class of the Order of the Sword (1936)
- (Sweden) Knight 1st Class of the order of the Order of Vasa (1941)
- (Sweden) Home Guard Medal of Merit
- (Sweden) Equestrian Olympic Medal (Ryttarolympisk förtjänstmedalj)

=== Foreign ===
- (Denmark) Commander 1st Class of the Order of the Dannebrog
- Commander 1st Class of the Order of the White Rose of Finland
- (Norway) Commander with Star of the Order of St. Olav (1 July 1954)
- (Finland) 3rd Class of the Order of the Cross of Liberty with swords
- (France) Commander of the Legion of Honour
- Grand Decoration of Honour in Gold with Star for Services to the Republic of Austria (1959)

== Honours ==
- Member of the Royal Swedish Academy of War Sciences (1944)

Military offices
Preceded by Sven Ryman	III Military District; 1950–1951	Succeeded by Sven Colliander
Preceded by Henry Kellgren	Military Office of the Ministry of Defence; 1951–1960	Succeeded by Holger Henning
Government offices
Preceded by Carl Hamnström	War Materials Inspector; 1960–1964	Succeeded by Björn Bjuggren
