= Ivan Duranthon =

French modern pentathlete

Personal information
- Born: 27 February 1897 Algiers, Algeria
- Died: 6 March 1978 (aged 81)

Sport
- Sport: Modern pentathlon

Ivan Duranthon (27 February 1897 – 6 March 1978) was a French modern pentathlete. He competed at the 1924 and 1932 Summer Olympics.
