= Sarroux =

Commune in Corrèze, France

- Part of Sarroux-Saint Julien
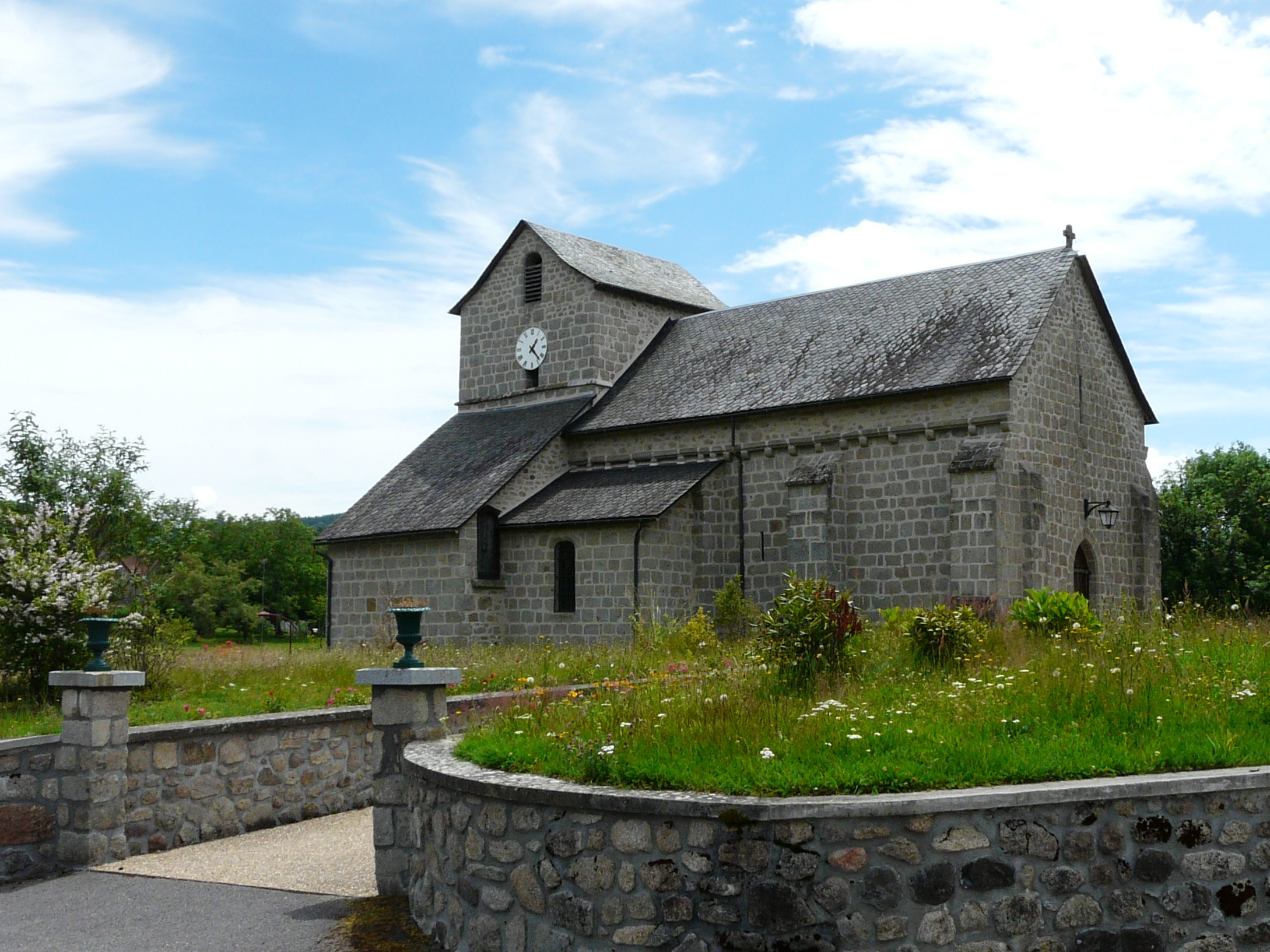
- The church in Sarroux
- Location of Sarroux
- Location within France Location within Nouvelle-Aquitaine
- Coordinates: 45°24′52″N 2°25′54″E
- Country: France
- Region: Nouvelle-Aquitaine
- Department: Corrèze
- Arrondissement: Ussel
- Canton: Haute-Dordogne
- Commune: Sarroux-Saint Julien
- Area^{1}: 23.76 km^{2} (9.17 sq mi)
- Population (2019): 444
  - Density: 18.7/km^{2} (48.4/sq mi)
- Time zone: UTC+01:00 (CET)
  - Summer (DST): UTC+02:00 (CEST)
- Postal code: 19110
- ^{1} French Land Register data, which excludes lakes, ponds, glaciers > 1 km^{2} (0.386 sq mi or 247 acres) and river estuaries.

Sarroux (French pronunciation: [saʁu]; Auvergnat: Sarron) is a former commune in the Corrèze department in central France. On 1 January 2017, it was merged into the new commune Sarroux-Saint Julien.

== See also ==
- Communes of the Corrèze department
