= Barent Momma =

Dutch modern pentathlete

Personal information
- Born: 15 February 1897 Bergen op Zoom, Netherlands
- Died: 31 January 1936 (aged 38) Velp, Netherlands

Sport
- Sport: Modern pentathlon

Barent Momma (15 February 1897 – 31 January 1936) was a Dutch modern pentathlete. He competed at the 1924 Summer Olympics.
