= Gaspare Pasta =

Italian modern pentathlete

Personal information
- Born: 14 December 1893 Padua, Italy
- Died: 1 August 1979 (aged 85)

Sport
- Sport: Modern pentathlon

Gaspare Pasta (14 December 1893 – 1 August 1979) was an Italian modern pentathlete. He competed at the 1924 Summer Olympics.
