= Henrik Avellan =

Finnish modern pentathlete (1902–1991)

Personal information
- Born: 15 May 1902 Viipuri, Grand Duchy of Finland
- Died: 28 May 1991 (aged 89) Stockholm, Sweden

Sport
- Sport: Modern pentathlon

Henrik Avellan (15 May 1902 – 28 May 1991) was a Finnish modern pentathlete. He competed at the 1924 and 1928 Summer Olympics.
