= Charles Jacques Le Vavasseur =

French modern pentathlete

Personal information
- Born: 19 January 1892
- Died: 8 January 1960 (aged 67)

Sport
- Sport: Modern pentathlon

Charles Jacques Le Vavasseur (19 January 1892 – 8 January 1960) was a French modern pentathlete and equestrian. He competed at the 1924 and 1928 Summer Olympics.
