= Helge Jensen =

Danish modern pentathlete

Personal information
- Born: 12 May 1896 Copenhagen, Denmark
- Died: 2 December 1961 (aged 65)

Sport
- Sport: Modern pentathlon

Helge Jensen (12 May 1896 – 2 December 1961) was a Danish modern pentathlete. He competed at the 1924 and 1928 Summer Olympics.
