= George Vokins =

British modern pentathlete

Personal information
- Born: 3 August 1896 Preston, Lancashire, England
- Died: 6 June 1985 (aged 88) Bury St. Edmunds, Suffolk, England

Sport
- Sport: Modern pentathlon

George Louis Vokins (3 August 1896 – 6 June 1985) was a British modern pentathlete. He competed at the 1924 Summer Olympics.

He was born in Preston, Lancashire the son of a British cavalry soldier. He and a younger brother were both pupils at the Duke of York's Royal Military School in Dover, Kent. He went on to join the British Army serving in the cavalry in World War 1 and the interwar years; and later the Royal Armoured Corps Yeomanry during the Second World War. He was awarded the Military Medal (twice) and later made a Member of the British Empire.
