= Frederick Barton (pentathlete) =

British modern pentathlete (1900–1993)

Personal information
- Born: 19 June 1900 Paddington, London, England
- Died: 20 November 1993 (aged 93) Ireland

Sport
- Sport: Modern pentathlon

Frederick Barton (19 June 1900 – 20 November 1993) was a British modern pentathlete. He competed at the 1924 Summer Olympics.

He attended Eton and the Royal Military College, Sandhurst, and was commissioned into the 17th/21st Lancers and became a captain. He lived in Ireland where he was Royal Dublin Society president from 1966 until 1968.
