= David Turquand-Young =

British modern pentathlete

Personal information
- Born: 13 January 1904 London, England
- Died: 14 September 1984 (aged 80) Blantyre, Malawi

Sport
- Sport: Modern pentathlon, rugby union

David Turquand-Young (13 January 1904 – 14 September 1984) was a British modern pentathlete. He competed at the 1924 and 1928 Summer Olympics. He was member of England national rugby union team in 1928 and 1929.
