= Otto Olsen (pentathlete) =

Danish modern pentathlete

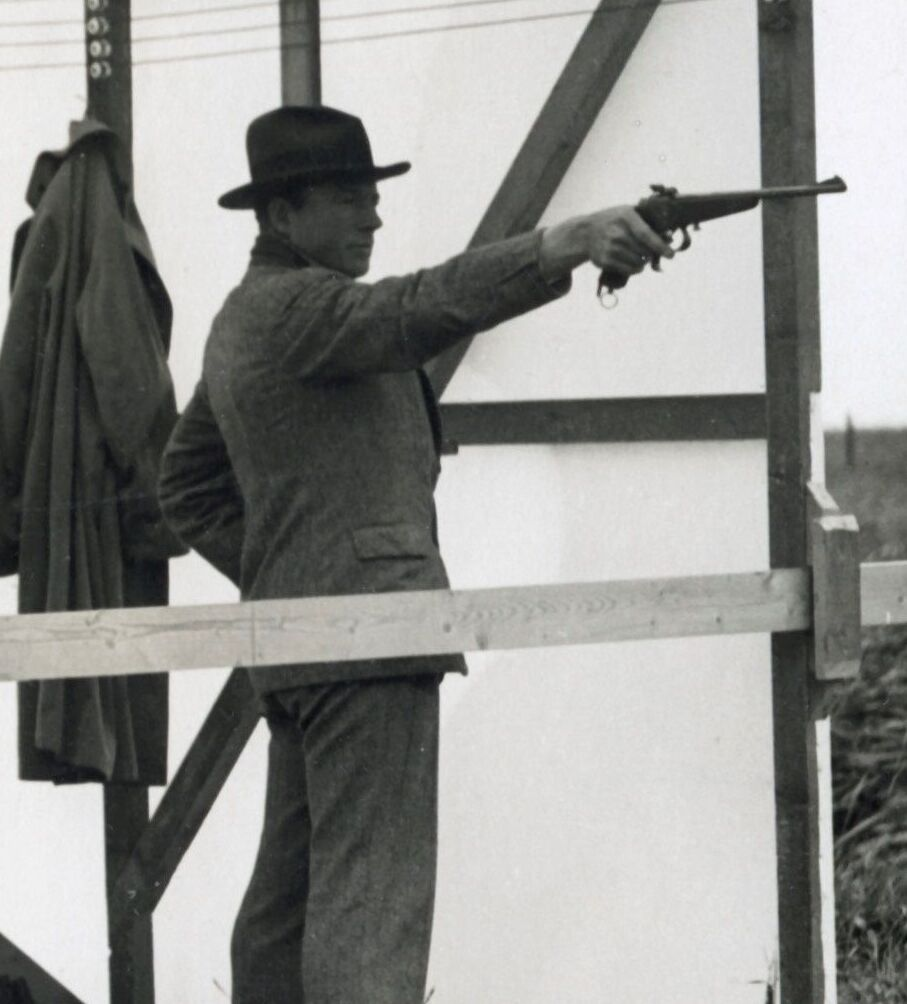
- Otto Olsen in 1928

Personal information
- Born: 12 December 1894 Næstved, Denmark
- Died: 24 October 1989 (aged 94) Roskilde, Denmark

Sport
- Sport: Modern pentathlon

Otto Olsen (12 December 1894 – 24 October 1989) was a Danish modern pentathlete. He competed at the 1924 and 1928 Summer Olympics.
