= Athletics at the 1928 Summer Olympics – Women's 100 metres =

Women's 100 metres at the Games of the IX Olympiad
- Venue: Olympic Stadium
- Date: July 30, 1928 (heats & semifinals); July 31, 1928 (final)
- Winning time: 12.2

Medalists
1st place, gold medalist(s)		Betty Robinson	United States
2nd place, silver medalist(s)		Bobbie Rosenfeld	Canada
3rd place, bronze medalist(s)		Ethel Smith	Canada

The women's 100 metres event at the 1928 Olympic Games took place between July 30 & July 31.

== Results ==
=== Heats ===
==== Heat 1 ====
Rank	Athlete	Nation	Time	Notes
1	Anni Holdmann	Germany	13.0	Q
2	Edie Robinson	Australia	Unknown	Q
3	Derna Polazzo	Italy	Unknown	

==== Heat 2 ====
Rank	Athlete	Nation	Time	Notes
1	Erna Steinberg	Germany	12.8	Q
2	Mary Washburn	United States	12.8	Q
3	Nettie Grooss	Netherlands	12.8	
4	Ruth Svedberg	Sweden	Unknown	

==== Heat 3 ====
Rank	Athlete	Nation	Time	Notes
1	Kinue Hitomi	Japan	12.8	Q
2	Jane Bell	Canada	13.0	Q
3	Anne Vrana-O'Brien	United States	13.1	
4	Matilde Moraschi	Italy	13.6	

==== Heat 4 ====
Rank	Athlete	Nation	Time	Notes
1	Leni Junker	Germany	12.8	Q
2	Elta Cartwright	United States	Unknown	Q
3	Yolande Plancke	France	Unknown	

==== Heat 5 ====
Rank	Athlete	Nation	Time	Notes
1	Georgette Gagneux	France	13.0	Q
2	Maud Sundberg	Sweden	Unknown	Q
3	Luigia Bonfanti	Italy	Unknown	

==== Heat 6 ====
Rank	Athlete	Nation	Time	Notes
1	Leni Schmidt	Germany	12.8	Q
2	Marjorie Clark	South Africa	13.0	Q
3	Lucienne Velu	France	13.1	
4	Rie Briejèr	Netherlands	13.5	

==== Heat 7 ====
Rank	Athlete	Nation	Time	Notes
1	Bobbie Rosenfeld	Canada	12.6	Q
2	Betty Robinson	United States	Unknown	Q
3	Lies Aengenendt	Netherlands	13.0	

==== Heat 8 ====
Rank	Athlete	Nation	Time	Notes
1	Myrtle Cook	Canada	12.8	Q
2	Norma Wilson	New Zealand	13.0	Q
3	Bets ter Horst	Netherlands	13.0	

==== Heat 9 ====
Rank	Athlete	Nation	Time	Notes
1	Ethel Smith	Canada	12.6	Q
2	Marguerite Radideau	France	Unknown	Q
3	Zinaida Liepiņa	Latvia	Unknown	
4	Sidonie Verschueren	Belgium	Unknown	

=== Semifinals ===
==== Semifinal 1 ====
Rank	Athlete	Nation	Time	Notes
1	Bobbie Rosenfeld	Canada	12.4	Q, OR
2	Ethel Smith	Canada	Unknown	Q
3	Georgette Gagneux	France	Unknown	
4	Anni Holdmann	Germany	Unknown	
5	Mary Washburn	United States	Unknown	
6	Marjorie Clark	South Africa	Unknown	

==== Semifinal 2 ====
Rank	Athlete	Nation	Time	Notes
1	Betty Robinson	United States	12.4	Q, =OR
2	Myrtle Cook	Canada	Unknown	Q
3	Edie Robinson	Australia	Unknown	
4	Kinue Hitomi	Japan	Unknown	
5	Leni Junker	Germany	Unknown	
6	Maud Sundberg	Sweden	Unknown	

==== Semifinal 3 ====
Rank	Athlete	Nation	Time	Notes
1	Leni Schmidt	Germany	12.8	Q
2	Erna Steinberg	Germany	12.9	Q
3	Jane Bell	Canada	Unknown	
4	Elta Cartwright	United States	Unknown	
5	Norma Wilson	New Zealand	Unknown	
6	Marguerite Radideau	France	Unknown	

=== Final ===
Rank	Athlete	Nation	Time	Notes
1st place, gold medalist(s)	Betty Robinson	United States	12.2	=OR
2nd place, silver medalist(s)	Bobbie Rosenfeld	Canada	12.3	
3rd place, bronze medalist(s)	Ethel Smith	Canada	12.3	
4	Erna Steinberg	Germany	12.4	
–	Myrtle Cook	Canada	DQ	
–	Leni Schmidt	Germany	DQ	
