= Athletics at the 1928 Summer Olympics – Women's 4 × 100 metres relay =

Women's 4 × 100 metres relay at the Games of the IX Olympiad
- Venue: Olympic Stadium
- Dates: August 4, 1928 (heats); August 5, 1928 (final)
- Competitors: from 8 nations
- Teams: 8
- Winning time: 48.4

Medalists
1st place, gold medalist(s)		Myrtle Cook; Ethel Smith; Bobbie Rosenfeld; Jane Bell	Canada
2nd place, silver medalist(s)		Jessie Cross; Loretta McNeil; Betty Robinson; Mary Washburn	United States
3rd place, bronze medalist(s)		Anni Holdmann; Leni Junker; Rosa Kellner; Leni Schmidt	Germany

The women's 4 × 100 metres relay event at the 1928 Olympic Games took place between August 4 & August 5.

== Results ==
=== Heats ===
Heat 1

Rank	Country	Athletes	Time	Notes
1	Canada	Ethel Smith, Bobbie Rosenfeld, Myrtle Cook, Jane Bell	49.3	Q, WR
2	Netherlands	Lies Aengenendt, Rie Briejèr, Jeanette Grooss, Bets ter Horst	50.4	Q
3	France	Georgette Gagneux, Yolande Plancke, Marguerite Radideau, Lucienne Velu	51.0	Q
4	Sweden	Maud Sundberg, Inga Gentzel, Emy Pettersson, Ruth Svedberg	53.2	

Key: Q = Qualified, WR = World record

Heat 2

Rank	Country	Athletes	Time	Notes
1	United States	Jessie Cross, Loretta McNeil, Betty Robinson, Mary Washburn	49.8	Q
2	Germany	Anni Holdmann, Leni Junker, Rosa Kellner, Leni Schmidt	49.8	Q
3	Italy	Luigia Bonfanti, Giannina Marchini, Derna Polazzo, Vittorina Vivenza		Q
4	Belgium	Elise Van Truyen, Rose Van Crombrugge, Juliette Segers, Léontine Stevens		

Key: Q = Qualified

=== Final ===
Rank	Country	Time	Notes	Competitors
1st place, gold medalist(s)	Canada	48.4	WR	Ethel Smith, Bobbie Rosenfeld, Myrtle Cook, Jane Bell
2nd place, silver medalist(s)	United States	48.8		Jessie Cross, Loretta McNeil, Betty Robinson, Mary Washburn
3rd place, bronze medalist(s)	Germany	49.0		Anni Holdmann, Leni Junker, Rosa Kellner, Leni Schmidt
4	France	49.6		Georgette Gagneux, Yolande Plancke, Marguerite Radideau, Lucienne Velu
5	Netherlands	49.8		Lies Aengenendt, Rie Briejèr, Jeanette Grooss, Bets ter Horst
6	Italy	53.6		Luigia Bonfanti, Giannina Marchini, Derna Polazzo, Vittorina Vivenza

Key: WR = World record
