= Athletics at the 1928 Summer Olympics =

Coordinates: 52.3434°N 4.8542°E

Athletics at the Games of the IX Olympiad
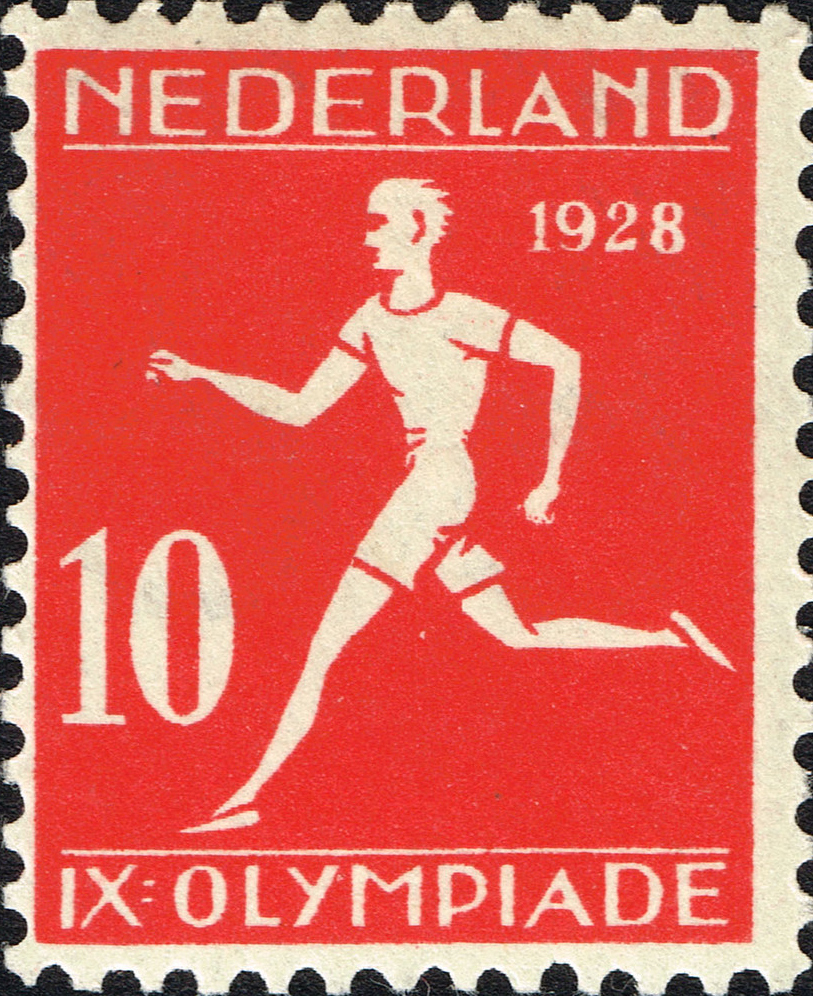
- Athletics at the 1928 Summer Olympics on a stamp of the Netherlands
- Venue: Olympic Stadium
- Dates: 29 July–5 August
- Competitors: 706 (611 men, 95 women) from 40 nations

At the 1928 Summer Olympics in Amsterdam, 27 athletics events were contested. The competition was held on a 400-meter track and would become the standard for athletics tracks in the future. For the first time, women's events in athletics were included in the Olympic Games program. There was a total of 706 participants from 40 countries competing.

== Medal summary ==
Rank	Nation	Gold	Silver	Bronze	Total
1	United States	9	8	8	25
2	Finland	5	5	4	14
3	Canada	4	2	2	8
4	Great Britain	2	2	1	5
5	Germany	1	2	6	9
6	Sweden	1	2	4	7
7	France	1	1	1	3
8	Japan	1	1	0	2
9	Ireland	1	0	0	1
9	Poland	1	0	0	1
9	South Africa	1	0	0	1
12	Chile	0	1	0	1
12	Haiti	0	1	0	1
12	Hungary	0	1	0	1
12	Netherlands	0	1	0	1
16	Norway	0	0	1	1
Totals (16 entries)		27	27	27	81

=== Men ===
Event	Gold		Silver		Bronze	
100 metres	Percy Williams; Canada	10.8	Jack London; Great Britain	10.9	Georg Lammers; Germany	10.9
200 metres	Percy Williams; Canada	21.8	Walter Rangeley; Great Britain	21.9	Helmut Körnig; Germany	21.9
400 metres	Ray Barbuti; United States	47.8	James Ball; Canada	48.0	Joachim Büchner; Germany	48.2
800 metres	Douglas Lowe; Great Britain	1:51.8	Erik Byléhn; Sweden	1:52.8	Hermann Engelhard; Germany	1:53.2
1500 metres	Harri Larva; Finland	3:53.2	Jules Ladoumegue; France	3:53.8	Eino Purje; Finland	3:56.4
5000 metres	Ville Ritola; Finland	14:38.0	Paavo Nurmi; Finland	14:40.0	Edvin Wide; Sweden	14:41.2
10,000 metres	Paavo Nurmi; Finland	30:18.8	Ville Ritola; Finland	30:19.4	Edvin Wide; Sweden	31:00.8
110 metres hurdles	Sydney Atkinson; South Africa	14.8	Steve Anderson; United States	14.8	John Collier; United States	14.9
400 metres hurdles	David Burghley; Great Britain	53.4	Frank Cuhel; United States	53.6	Morgan Taylor; United States	53.6
3000 metres steeplechase	Toivo Loukola; Finland	9:21.8	Paavo Nurmi; Finland	9:31.2	Ove Andersen; Finland	9:35.6
4 × 100 metres relay	United States; Frank Wykoff; James Quinn; Charles Borah; Henry Russell	41.0	Germany; Georg Lammers; Richard Corts; Hubert Houben; Helmut Körnig	41.2	Great Britain; Cyril Gill; Edward Smouha; Walter Rangeley; Jack London	41.8
4 × 400 metres relay	United States; George Baird; Fred Alderman; Emerson Spencer; Ray Barbuti	3:14.2	Germany; Otto Neumann; Harry Werner Storz; Richard Krebs; Hermann Engelhard	3:14.8	Canada; James Ball; Stanley Glover; Phil Edwards; Alex Wilson	3:15.4
Marathon	Boughera El Ouafi; France	2:32:57	Manuel Plaza; Chile	2:33:23	Martti Marttelin; Finland	2:35:02
High jump	Bob King; United States	1.94 m	Benjamin Hedges; United States	1.91 m	Claude Ménard; France	1.91 m
Pole vault	Sabin Carr; United States	4.20 m	William Droegemuller; United States	4.10 m	Charles McGinnis; United States	3.95 m
Long jump	Edward Hamm; United States	7.73 m	Silvio Cator; Haiti	7.58 m	Alfred Bates; United States	7.40 m
Triple jump	Mikio Oda; Japan	15.21 m	Levi Casey; United States	15.17 m	Vilho Tuulos; Finland	15.11 m
Shot put	John Kuck; United States	15.87 m	Herman Brix; United States	15.75 m	Emil Hirschfeld; Germany	15.72 m
Discus throw	Bud Houser; United States	47.32 m	Antero Kivi; Finland	47.23 m	James Corson; United States	47.10 m
Hammer throw	Pat O'Callaghan; Ireland	51.39 m	Ossian Skiöld; Sweden	51.29 m	Edmund Black; United States	49.03 m
Javelin throw	Erik Lundqvist; Sweden	66.60 m	Béla Szepes; Hungary	65.26 m	Olav Sunde; Norway	63.97 m
Decathlon	Paavo Yrjölä; Finland	8053.290 pts	Akilles Järvinen; Finland	7931.500 pts	Ken Doherty; United States	7706.650 pts

=== Women ===
Event	Gold		Silver		Bronze	
100 metres	Betty Robinson; United States	12.2	Bobbie Rosenfeld; Canada	12.3	Ethel Smith; Canada	12.3
800 metres	Lina Radke; Germany	2:16.8	Kinue Hitomi; Japan	2:17.6	Inga Gentzel; Sweden	2:17.8
4 × 100 metres relay	Canada; Myrtle Cook; Ethel Smith; Bobbie Rosenfeld; Jane Bell	48.4	United States; Jessie Cross; Loretta McNeil; Betty Robinson; Mary Washburn	48.8	Germany; Anni Holdmann; Leni Junker; Rosa Kellner; Leni Schmidt	49.0
High jump	Ethel Catherwood; Canada	1.595 m	Lien Gisolf; Netherlands	1.56 m	Mildred Wiley; United States	1.56 m
Discus throw	Halina Konopacka; Poland	39.62 m	Lillian Copeland; United States	37.08 m	Ruth Svedberg; Sweden	35.92 m

== Records broken ==
During the 1928 Summer Olympic Games 9 new world records were set in the athletics events. New Olympic records were set in 16 of the 27 events.

=== Men's world records ===
Event	Date	Round	Name	Nationality	Result
110 metres hurdles	July 31	Semifinal	George Weightman-Smith	South Africa	14.6
3000 metres steeplechase	August 4	Final	Toivo Loukola	Finland	9:21.8
4 × 400 metres relay	August 5	Final	George Baird; Fred Alderman; Emerson Spencer; Ray Barbuti	United States	3:14.2
Shot put	July 29	Final	John Kuck	United States	15.87 m
Decathlon	August 5	Final	Paavo Yrjölä	Finland	8,053.290

=== Women's world records ===
Event	Date	Round	Name	Nationality	Result
800 metres	August 2	Final	Lina Radke	Germany	2:16.8
4 × 100 metres relay	August 5	Final	Myrtle Cook; Ethel Smith; Bobbie Rosenfeld; Jane Bell	Canada	48.4
High jump	August 5	Final	Ethel Catherwood	Canada	1.595 m
Discus throw	July 31	Final	Halina Konopacka	Poland	39.62 m

== Participating nations ==
706 athletes from 40 nations competed. Lithuania and Romania competed in athletics for the first time. Bulgaria, Egypt, Malta, Panama, Rhodesia, and Uruguay were the only six nations not to compete in athletics.

- Argentina (7)
- Australia (7)
- Austria (4)
- Belgium (32)
- Canada (32)
- Chile (8)
- Cuba (1)
- Czechoslovakia (11)
- Denmark (10)
- Estonia (4)
- Finland (35)
- France (50)
- Germany (62)
- Great Britain (55)

- Greece (13)
- Haiti (2)
- Hungary (26)
- India (7)
- Ireland (10)
- Italy (24)
- Japan (16)
- Latvia (6)
- Lithuania (5)
- Luxembourg (4)
- Mexico (11)
- Monaco (1)
- Netherlands (50)
- New Zealand (3)

- Norway (13)
- Philippines (2)
- Poland (15)
- Portugal (3)
- Romania (13)
- South Africa (9)
- Spain (10)
- Sweden (29)
- Switzerland (9)
- Turkey (6)
- United States (98)
- Yugoslavia (4)
