= Derna Polazzo =

Italian sprinter and long jumper

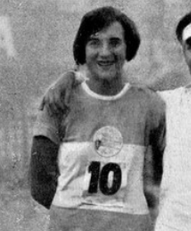
- Derna Polazzo in 1920s

Personal information
- Full name: Giovanna
- Nationality: Italian
- Born: 27 March 1912 Trieste, Austria-Hungary
- Died: 3 January 1994 (aged 81)

Sport
- Country: Italy
- Sport: Athletics
- Event(s): Sprint; Long jump
- Club: SG Triestina

Achievements and titles
- Personal best: 100 m: 13.0 (1928)

Derna Polazzo (27 March 1912 – 3 January 1994) was an Italian sprinter and long jumper. She was born in Trieste.

== Achievements ==
Year	Competition	Venue	Position	Event	Performance	Note
1928	Olympic Games	(Netherlands) Amsterdam	Heat	100 metres	-	
1928	Olympic Games	(Netherlands) Amsterdam	6th	4 × 100 m relay	53.6	

== National titles ==
Polazzo twice won the individual national championship.

- 1 win in 80 metres (1929)
- 1 win in Long jump (1928)

== See also ==
- Italy national relay team
