= Isabelle Plancke =

French swimmer (1910–1997)

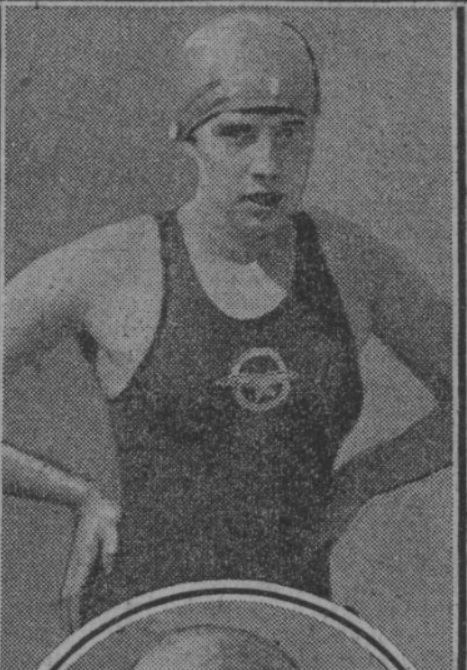
- Plancke in 1926

Personal information
- Full name: Isabelle Raymonde Madeleine Plancke
- Nationality: French
- Born: 8 April 1910 Comines, France
- Died: 1 August 1997 (aged 87) Limeil-Brévannes, France

Sport
- Sport: Swimming
- Strokes: breaststroke
- Club: Mouettes de Paris; CN Marseille

Isabelle Raymonde Madeleine Plancke (April 8, 1910 - August 1, 1997) was a French athlete who Specialized in swimming and water polo. She was particularly skilled in breaststroke and long-distance swimming in open water.

== Career ==
Isabelle Plancke started swimming when she was 12 years old, joining the Mouettes de Paris team. She and her teammates won several Paris championship titles in the relay event. Later, in the early 1930s, she joined CN Marseille, furthering her swimming career.

Isabelle Plancke was a skilled long-distance swimmer who competed in numerous open water races. She participated in the prestigious Traversée de Paris à la nage, France's top open water swimming event, several times. She achieved impressive results, finishing second in 1926 and 1927, and fourth in 1931 and 1932. In 1931, she and her team took first place in the team category.

== Early life ==
Isabelle Plancke was born on April 18, 1910, in Comines. Her father worked in sales, and her mother, Julie Delporte, later moved to Paris as well. By 1929, the family was living on Rue des Goncourt. Isabelle had a sister, Yolande Plancke, who went on to become an Olympic athlete.

Plancke tied the knot with Yves Garnier on August 7, 1943, in Paris. At the time of her marriage, she was working as a production manager and was living with her widowed mother in Soisy-sous-Montmorency. She divorced three years after her marriage. She died in Limeil-Brévannes on 1 August 1997, at the age of 87.
