= Bobbie Rosenfeld =

Canadian Olympic sprinter (1904–1969)

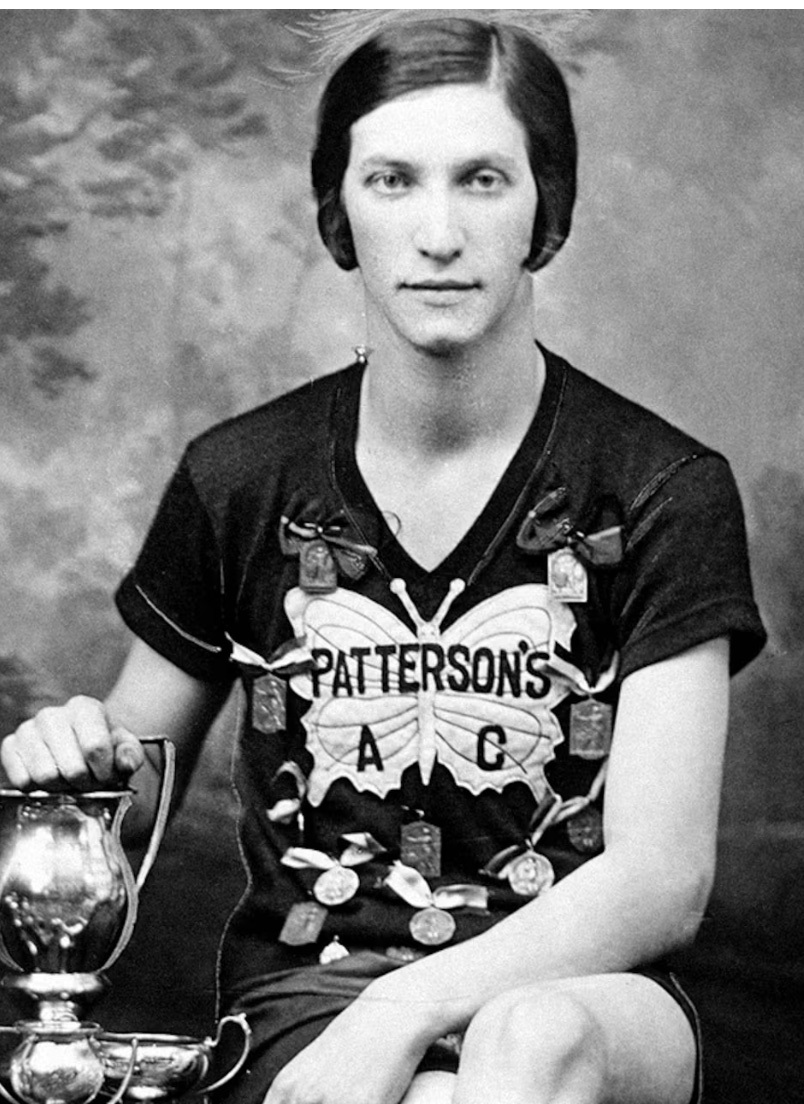
- Rosenfeld c. 1928

Personal information
- Born: Fanny Rosenfeld; December 28, 1904 Ekaterinoslav, Russian Empire (now Dnipro, Ukraine)
- Died: November 13, 1969 (aged 64) Toronto, Ontario, Canada
- Height: 169 cm (5 ft 7 in)
- Weight: 61 kg (134 lb)

Sport
- Country: Canada
- Sport: Athletics
- Events: 100 m, 200 m, 4 × 100 m relay
- Club: Parkdale Ladies' Athletic Club, Toronto
Medal record
Women's athletics
Representing Canada
Olympic Games
Gold medal – first place	1928 Amsterdam	4 × 100 m relay
Silver medal – second place	1928 Amsterdam	100 metres

Fanny "Bobbie" Rosenfeld (December 28, 1904 – November 14, 1969) was a Canadian track and field athlete and sports journalist who won a gold medal in the 4 × 100 metres relay and a silver medal in the 100 metres at the 1928 Summer Olympics in Amsterdam. She competed as a member of Canada's first Olympic women's track and field team, later known as the "Matchless Six", which took part in the first Olympic Games to include women's athletics in 1928. Rosenfeld ran the opening leg of the relay alongside Jane Bell, Ethel Smith, and Myrtle Cook, and the Canadian team won the event in a world-record time of 48.4 seconds.

Before the Olympics Rosenfeld was one of Canada's most versatile female athletes, competing at an elite level in track and field, softball, basketball, ice hockey, and tennis. She set multiple Canadian track records in the 1920s and was widely regarded as one of the country's leading women athletes of the era.

After retiring from competition Rosenfeld became a sports journalist with the Toronto Globe and Mail, where she wrote a long-running column and remained an influential voice in Canadian sport. She was later named Canada's female athlete of the first half of the twentieth century and was inducted into several halls of fame, including Canada's Sports Hall of Fame.

== Early life and education ==
Rosenfeld was born on December 28, 1904, in Ekaterinoslav, Russian Empire (now Dnipro, Ukraine), into a Jewish family. When she was an infant, her parents emigrated to Canada and settled in Barrie, Ontario. Her father, Max Rosenfeld, operated a junk and scrap business, while her mother, Sarah Rosenfeld, managed the household and raised the couple's five children.

Rosenfeld grew up in Barrie and attended Central School before enrolling at Barrie Collegiate Institute. During her school years she became known among classmates for her enthusiasm for physical activity and sport. Although organized athletics for girls were still developing in the early twentieth century, she participated in several sports available to students, including basketball, softball, lacrosse, hockey, and tennis.

At school, friends began calling her "Bobbie" because of her bobbed haircut, a fashionable style among young women of the 1920s. The nickname stayed with her throughout her life.

In 1922, at age 17, Rosenfeld and her family moved to Toronto. She found work at a chocolate factory while becoming active in the city’s Jewish community organizations, including the Young Women's Hebrew Association (YWHA), which served as an important social and recreational centre for Jewish women in Toronto.

== Early athletic career ==
After moving to Toronto with her family in 1922, Rosenfeld quickly became active in the city’s growing women's athletic community. The YWHA provided opportunities for organized sport at a time when such programs were still limited. There she participated in several sports, including basketball, ice hockey, softball, tennis, lacrosse, and track and field, establishing an early reputation for exceptional versatility.

Basketball was among her first organized successes in the city. Playing centre for the YWHA team, Rosenfeld helped lead the club to both the Toronto and Ontario championships in 1922. Her speed, strength, and competitive style quickly drew attention within Toronto's expanding network of women's athletic clubs.

Rosenfeld's introduction to competitive track and field occurred largely by chance. In 1923 teammates encouraged her to enter a race at a sporting carnival in Beaverton, Ontario. Competing in the 100-yard (91 m) dash, she defeated the reigning Canadian champion Rosa Grosse. The result attracted immediate notice from organizers and coaches involved in the development of women's athletics in Canada.

Following that performance, Rosenfeld began competing regularly in track events while continuing to participate in several other sports. Later that year she appeared at meets held during the Canadian National Exhibition (CNE) in Toronto and at some of Ontario's earliest women's track and field championships. Even while maintaining a demanding schedule across multiple sports, she rapidly established herself as one of the province's leading female athletes.

Accounts from competitions at the CNE also illustrate the informal conditions that characterized women's athletics in the early 1920s. While the American runners wore standardized track uniforms, Rosenfeld reportedly competed in improvised clothing: her brother's swimming shorts, her father's socks, and the softball jersey from her Hinde & Dauch Paper Company team. Specialized athletic clothing for women was still developing, and many competitors trained and raced in whatever attire was available.

Rosenfeld's most notable early performance came at the 1925 Ontario Ladies Track and Field Championships, where she won five events in a single day and placed second in two others. By the mid 1920s Rosenfeld was setting records in several field events and relay competitions while remaining active in other sports such as hockey and softball.

During this period, she trained in Toronto alongside several athletes who would later form the core of Canada's Olympic team, including Myrtle Cook and Grace Conacher. Their appearances at events such as the women's competitions at the CNE helped popularize women's track events and attract larger crowds.

Although Rosenfeld continued to compete in multiple sports, Canadian coaches increasingly directed her toward sprint events, recognizing that her speed would be particularly valuable in international competition.

By the time the Canadian women's team was selected for the 1928 Summer Olympics in Amsterdam, Rosenfeld was already widely recognized as one of the country's most accomplished female athletes. She was chosen as one of six women representing Canada in athletics, a group later known in the press as the Matchless Six.

== 1928 Olympics ==
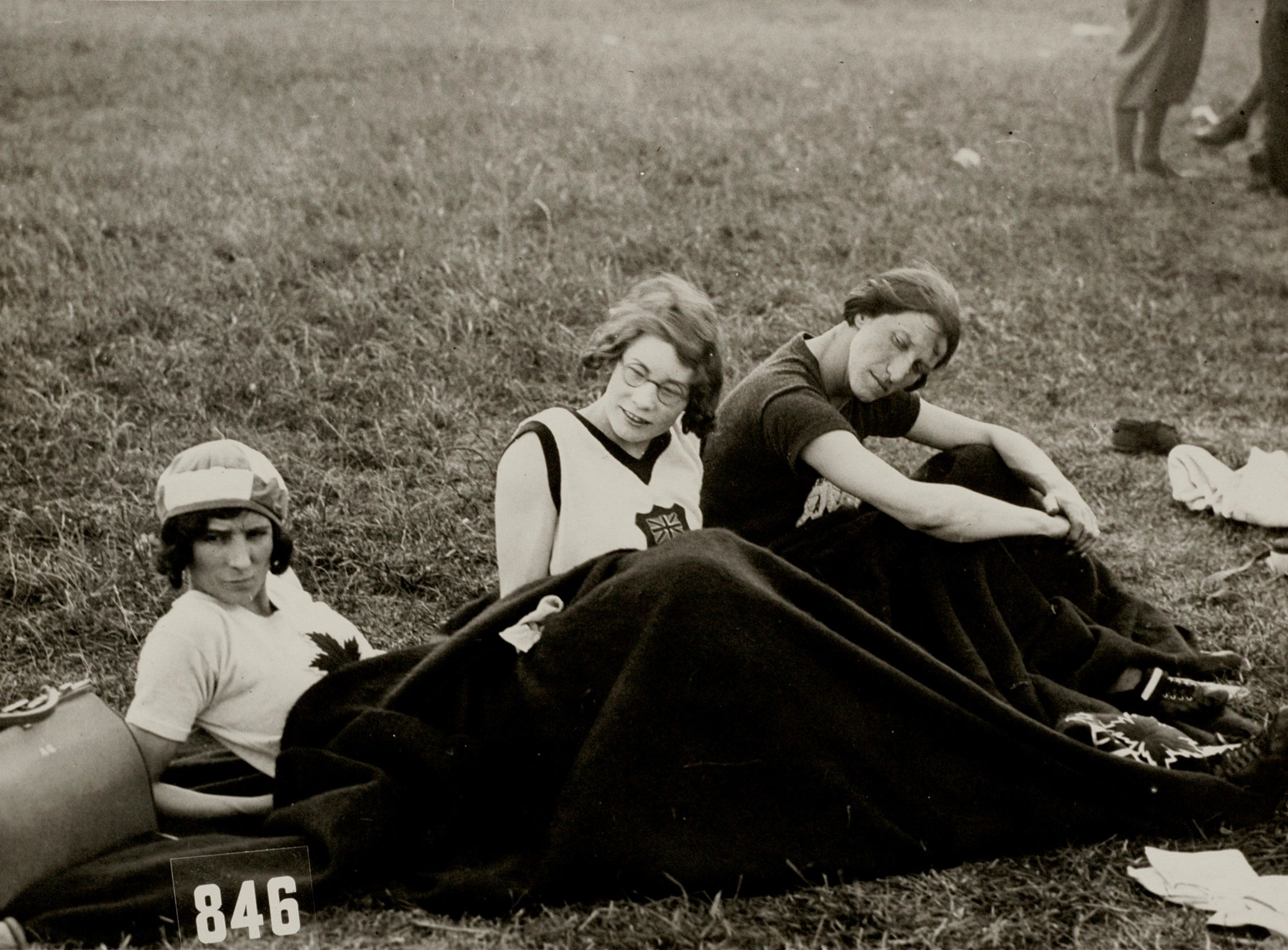
Canadian sprinters Myrtle Cook, Ethel Smith, and Fanny "Bobbie" Rosenfeld awaiting the start of the 100 metres at the 1928 Summer Olympics in Amsterdam, Netherlands.

The 1928 Summer Olympics in Amsterdam marked a turning point in international sport. They were the first Olympic Games to include women's track and field events, following years of debate within the International Olympic Committee about whether women should be allowed to compete in athletics.

During the Canadian trials for the 1928 Summer Olympics, Rosenfeld set numerous Canadian track and field records. These included the running broad jump, standing broad jump and the discus throw. Her time in the 100 metres (330 ft) was four-fifths of a second slower than the world record at that time.

In Amsterdam, Rosenfeld competed in three events: the 100 metres (330 ft) sprint, the 4 × 100 metres relay, and the 800 metres. The relay consisted of four runners, each completing one quarter of the race.

In the 100 metres final, American sprinter Betty Robinson took an early lead. Rosenfeld closed the gap near the finish, and the result was initially difficult to determine. After deliberation among the judges, Robinson was awarded the gold medal. Rosenfeld received the silver medal, while her Canadian teammate Ethel Smith took bronze.

Rosenfeld also ran the opening leg of the Canadian 4 × 100 metres relay team alongside Jane Bell, Myrtle Cook, and Smith. The team won the gold medal and set a new world record, one of the most celebrated victories for the Canadian women's team at the Games.

She later competed in the 800 metres, although she had not specifically trained for the event. Women's team manager Alexandrine Gibb encouraged Rosenfeld to enter the race in support of teammate Jean Thompson, who had been injured before the competition. During the race Thompson briefly held the lead but began to fade in the final stages. Rosenfeld caught up to her teammate and remained beside her near the finish, encouraging Thompson to complete the race. Thompson finished fourth and Rosenfeld fifth.

The women's 800 metre race later became controversial after newspaper reports claimed that competitors had collapsed from exhaustion at the finish. Although photographs and film footage show most runners recovering quickly, the coverage sparked debate about women's participation in endurance events. As a result, the event was removed from the Olympic program and did not return until the 1960 Summer Olympics.

Overall, she "scored more points for her country than any other athlete at the Games, male or female."

When the Canadian athletes returned from Amsterdam, they were welcomed with a large public celebration in Toronto. An estimated 200,000 spectators lined the streets to greet the returning competitors, including the six women later celebrated in the Canadian press as the Matchless Six. Rosenfeld later recalled the reception as "a thrill you will never forget."

== Post-Olympic career ==
After the 1928 Summer Olympics, Rosenfeld returned to an active sporting life, continuing to compete in ice hockey and softball while remaining one of Canada's most prominent female athletes. In September 1929 she developed a severe case of arthritis, which left her bedridden for eight months and required her to use crutches for more than a year. Although she later returned briefly to competition and was voted the top women's hockey player in Ontario in 1932, recurring arthritis forced her to retire from competitive athletics in 1933.

=== Sport administration and coaching ===
Despite the end of her athletic career, Rosenfeld remained a prominent figure in Canadian sport through administration, coaching, and team management. In 1934 she served as coach of the Canadian women's track and field team at the 1934 British Empire Games in London. She also worked as manager of the Lakeside Langleys, a Toronto softball team that played an exhibition game before a crowd of 14,000 spectators at Madison Square Garden in New York City. The large audience reflected the growing popularity of women's amateur sport during the period.

Rosenfeld was also active in sports administration. From 1934 to 1939 she served as president of the Ladies Ontario Hockey Association, one of the main governing bodies for women's ice hockey in the province. From 1937 to 1939 she also served as president of the Dominion Women's Amateur Hockey Association, the national organization responsible for women's amateur hockey in Canada. She succeeded fellow Olympian Myrtle Cook-McGowan as president, until hockey player Mary Dunn assumed the position. In these roles she helped organize and administer women's amateur sport at both the provincial and national level during a period when organized opportunities for female athletes were still limited.

=== Journalism ===
Rosenfeld also built a second career as a sports journalist. In 1932 she briefly worked as a sports writer for the Montreal Daily Herald, where she helped establish the Provincial Women's Softball Union of Quebec and served as its first president. In 1936 she joined the sports department of The Globe and Mail, becoming one of the first women in Canada to work as a sports columnist.

Her column, initially titled Feminine Sports Reel and later shortened to Sports Reel, first appeared in 1937 and ran for nearly two decades. The column covered local, national, and international sport and Rosenfeld regularly used it to promote greater participation by women and expanded physical education opportunities for girls. At the time, women athletes were frequently written about in newspapers but rarely worked as sports journalists themselves.

Rosenfeld's writing was widely noted for its wit and its defence of women athletes at a time when many commentators argued that competitive sport was unfeminine. In a 1933 article in Chatelaine titled "Girls are in Sports for Good", she responded to such criticism by writing:

Athletic maids, to arms! Andy Lytle beware! We are taking up the sword, and high time it is, in defense of our so called athletic bodies to give the lie to those pen flourishers who depict us not as paragons of feminine physique, beauty and health, but rather as Amazons and ugly ducklings, all because we have become sport minded and have chosen to delve so wholeheartedly into competitive sport.

Her final Sports Reel column appeared on 3 December 1958, although she continued working for The Globe and Mail until 1966.

== Death ==
Rosenfeld died in Toronto on November 13, 1969 at the age of 64. She is buried at Lambton Mills Cemetery in Humber Valley Village.

== Legacy ==
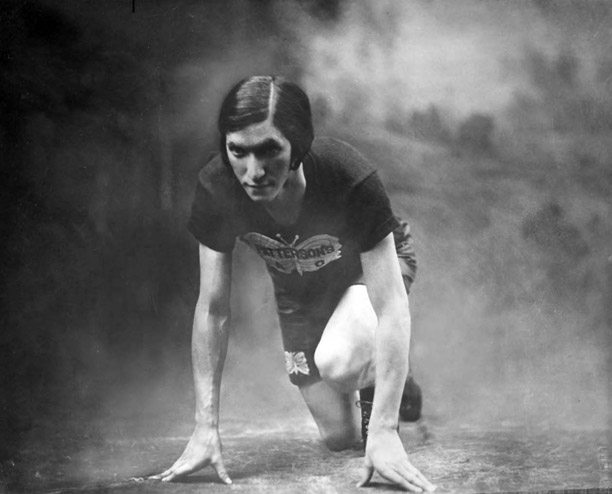
Rosenfeld c. 1928

=== Competitive legacy ===
- Won the Toronto grass-courts tennis championship (1924).
- At the Ontario Ladies' Track and Field Championships (1925), won five events (shot put, discus, running broad jump, 200 yards, 100 yards low hurdles) and placed second in two events (100 yards, javelin).
- Tied the world record in the 100-yard dash (11.0 seconds) in 1925 (shared with Rosa Grosse).
- Member of the "Matchless Six"—Canada's national women's track team—at the first Olympic Games to include women's track and field events (1928).
- Won two Olympic medals at the 1928 Summer Olympics in Amsterdam: gold in the women's 4 × 100 metres relay and silver in the women's 100 metres; also finished fifth in the women's 800 metres.

=== Honours and institutional recognition ===
- Inducted into the Canadian Olympic Hall of Fame (1949).
- Chosen Canada's outstanding female athlete of the half-century (1900–1950) (1949).
- Inducted into Canada's Sports Hall of Fame (1955).
- Designated a National Historic Person by the Historic Sites and Monuments Board of Canada (designation date: June 15, 1976).
- Inducted into the Ontario Sports Hall of Fame (1996).

=== Named awards and continuing influence ===
- The Canadian Press annually recognizes Canada's top female athlete with the Bobbie Rosenfeld Award, named in her honour since 1933.

=== Commemoration in public space and material culture ===
- Commemorative plaque installed at the Allandale Recreation Centre in Barrie, Ontario; plaque text approved by the Historic Sites and Monuments Board of Canada in 1986.
- Plaque dedicated in June 1987 at the Allandale Recreation Centre.
- Bobbie Rosenfeld Park established by the City of Toronto in 1991, located between the CN Tower and the Rogers Centre; the park includes a Toronto Historical Board plaque.
- Canada Post issued a commemorative postage stamp honouring Rosenfeld in 1996.

=== Biographical and historical works ===
- Anne Dublin, Bobbie Rosenfeld: The Olympian Who Could Do Everything. Toronto: Second Story Press, 2004. ISBN 1-896764-82-7.
- J. Bradley Cruxton and W. Douglas Wilson, Spotlight Canada, 4th ed. (includes coverage of Rosenfeld as a national sporting figure).

== See also ==
- List of Jewish track and field athletes
