= Luigia Bonfanti =

Italian sprinter and long jumper (1907–1973)

Personal information
- Nationality: Italian
- Born: 29 September 1907 Milan, Italy
- Died: 10 December 1973 (aged 66)

Sport
- Country: Italy
- Sport: Athletics
- Event(s): Sprint; Long jump
- Club: Forza e Coraggio Milano

Achievements and titles
- Personal bests: 100 m: 13.2 (1926); Long jump: 4.90 m (1923)

Luigia Bonfanti (29 September 1907 – 10 December 1973) was an Italian sprinter and long jumper. She was born in Milan.

== Biography ==
Bonfanti participated at one edition of the Summer Olympics (1928) and earned two caps with the national team from 1927 to 1928.

== Achievements ==
Year	Competition	Venue	Position	Event	Performance	Note
1928	Olympic Games	(Netherlands) Amsterdam	Heat	100 metres	-	
1928	Olympic Games	(Netherlands) Amsterdam	6th	4 × 100 m relay	53.6	

== National titles ==
Bonfanti won the individual national championship four times.

- 1 win in 75 metres (1926)
- 1 win in 80 metres (1925)
- 1 win in 100 metres (1927)
- 1 win in Long jump (1926)

== See also ==
- Italian record progression women's long jump
- Italy national relay team
