= Moraschi =

Moraschi is a surname. Notable people with the surname include:

- Laurie Moraschi (1942–2018), Australian rugby league footballer
- Matilde Moraschi (1910–2004), Italian sprinter and basketball player
