= Vittorina Vivenza =

Italian athlete (1912–2007)

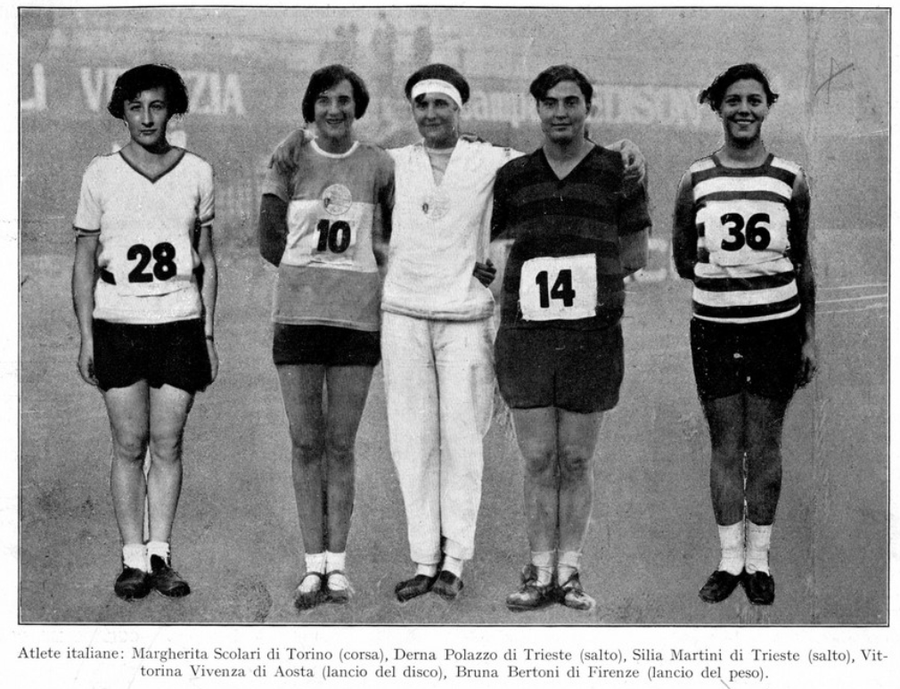
- Vivenza, second from right

Personal information
- Nationality: Italian
- Born: June 6, 1912 Villalba, Italy
- Died: 3 April 2007 (aged 94) Aosta, Italy

Sport
- Country: Italy
- Sport: Athletics
- Event(s): Sprint; Standing long jump Discus throw Shot put

Achievements and titles
- Personal bests: 100 m: 13.8 (1927); Shot put 9.17 m (1927); Discus throw:35.38 m (1929)
Medal record
Women's World Games
Bronze medal – third place	1930 Prague	Discus throw

Vittorina Vivenza (6 June 1912 in Villalba – 3 April 2007 in Aosta) was an Italian versatile athlete.

== Achievements ==
Year	Competition	Venue	Position	Event	Performance	Note
1928	Olympic Games	(Netherlands) Amsterdam	6th	4 × 100 m relay	53.6	

== National titles ==
Vittorina Vivenza has won six times the national championship.

- 1 win in Long jump (1927)
- 2 wins in Standing long jump (1926, 1930)
- 3 wins in Discus throw (1928, 1929, 1930)

== See also ==
- Italy national relay team
