= Erna Steinberg =

German sprinter

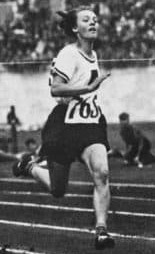
Erna Steinberg in 1928

Erna Steinberg (also Erna Boeck; 30 June 1911 – 21 April 2001) was a German track and field athlete who specialised in sprinting events.

Born in Charlottenburg, she competed in the first ever women's 100 metres at the Olympics, held at the 1928 Amsterdam Olympics. At seventeen years old she was among the youngest entrants. Running in the second heat, she won her race in 12.8 seconds – a short-lived Olympic record for the event. She was second to the more experienced Leni Schmidt in the semi-final. Steinberg placed fourth in the first women's Olympic final in the 100 m in a time of 12.4 seconds (Schmidt and Myrtle Cook had been disqualified so she was the last to finish in the six-woman race). This was her only Olympic appearance. During her career she was affiliated with SC Brandenburg. She died in Berlin in 2001 shortly before her 90th birthday.
