= Grooss =

Grooss is a surname. Notable people with the surname include:

- Mathilde Grooss Viddal (born 1969), Norwegian musician and composer
- Nettie Grooss (1905–1977), Dutch sprinter
