= Giannina Marchini =

Personal information
- Full name: Giovanna Marchini
- Nationality: Italian
- Born: 18 January 1906 Florence, Italy
- Died: 9 September 1976 (aged 70) ?, Italy

Sport
- Country: Italy
- Sport: Athletics
- Events: Sprint; 800 metres
- Club: Giglio Rosso Firenze

Achievements and titles
- Personal best: 800 m: 2.27.8 (1929)

Giannina Marchini (18 January 1906 – 9 September 1976) was an Italian sprinter and middle distance runner. She was born in Florence.

== Achievements ==
Year	Competition	Venue	Position	Event	Performance	Note
1928	Olympic Games	(Netherlands) Amsterdam	Heat	800 metres	-	
1928	Olympic Games	(Netherlands) Amsterdam	6th	4 × 100 m relay	53.6	

== National titles ==
Marchini won the individual national championship twice.

- 1 win in 400 metres (1928)
- 1 win in Cross country running (1929)

== See also ==
- Italy national relay team
