= Don McGowan =

Canadian television personality (1938–2023)

- Born: January 24, 1938; Montreal, Quebec, Canada
- Died: February 27, 2023 (aged 85); Brockville, Ontario, Canada
- Education: McGill University
- Occupations: Weather presenter, news anchor, television host
- Known for: CFCF-TV
- Mother: Myrtle McGowan
- Awards: Queen Elizabeth II Diamond Jubilee Medal

Donald Lloyd McGowan (January 24, 1938 – February 27, 2023) was a Canadian television personality at CFCF-TV in Montreal from 1962 to 1998, known as the evening news weather presenter, as host of multiple talk shows including People in Conflict, McGowan & Co., McGowan's Montreal, and McGowan's World. Also co-anchor of the late night newscasts, McGowan presented multiple game shows including the Canadian version of What's My Line?, and became executive producer of local programs in 1987. Hosting the weekly Travel, Travel show later in his career, which featured global travel in broadcast syndication in Canada and on the Travel Channel.

McGowan was the son of sportswriters Lloyd and Myrtle McGowan, graduated from McGill Conservatorium wanting to be an actor, and spent his early career with CKX-TV in Brandon, CKMI-DT in Quebec City, and CJSS-TV in Cornwall. Seeing himself as a performer, McGowan used multiple antics and one-liners presenting the weather, and was described by CFCF colleagues as "serious yet mischievous", and having "an offbeat sense of humour that endeared him to all of his viewers". In retirement, McGowan chaired fund raising and renovation of the Brockville Arts Centre, which earned him the Queen Elizabeth II Diamond Jubilee Medal in 2012.

== Early life ==
Donald Lloyd McGowan was born on January 24, 1938, in Montreal. Growing up in Outremont, he was the son of sportswriter Lloyd McGowan, and Olympic gold medallist and sportswriter Myrtle McGowan. McGowan spent a lot of time at Delorimier Stadium, where the Montreal Royals played and his father reported on baseball.

Wanting to be an actor, McGowan was inspired by the humour of Ernie Kovacs. Attending McGill Conservatorium, McGowan graduated from the announcing, production, and programming course. He was a cast member of the Mountfayre Players in Outremont 1954 to 1957, (Note: McGowan was a cast member of the Mountfayre Players in 1954, 1955, 1956, and 1957.) and produced the musical comedy Showtime at the Fairmount-St. Giles Hall in Outremont.

== Television career ==
=== Early career ===
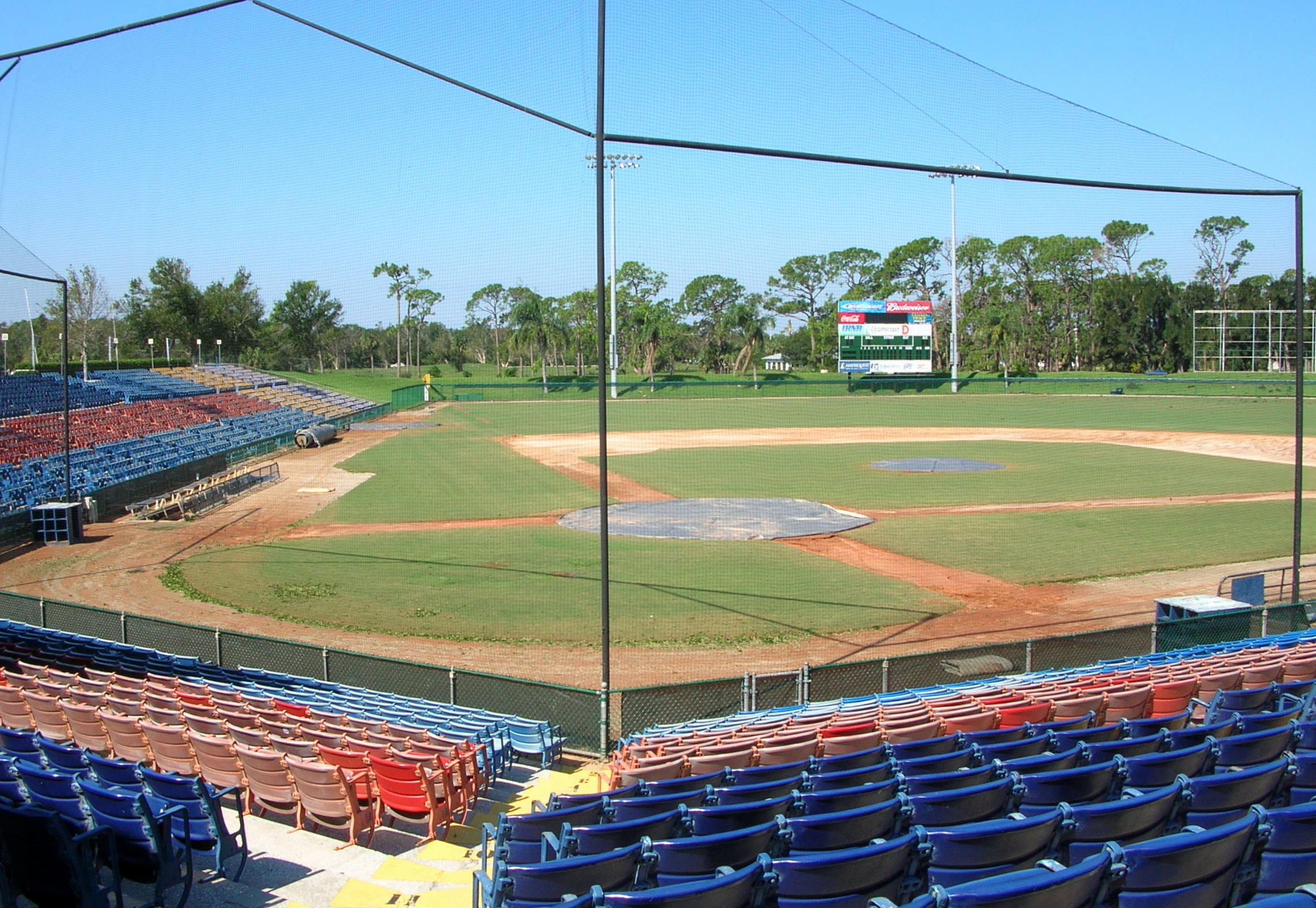
McGowan reported from Holman Stadium (Vero Beach) at the Historic Dodgertown spring training complex

In 1957, McGowan went to Manitoba seeking a job in television, following a recommendation by his church's organist whose brothers owned a station. Beginning his broadcasting career in Brandon, McGowan was a disc jockey on CKX, and hosted a weekly Spotlight on Talent show on CKX-TV.

Moving to Quebec City in 1958, McGowan was a staff announcer on CKMI-DT. While hosting Dateline Quebec, he interviewed Montreal journalist and his mother, Myrtle McGowan. In 1959, he was a guest announced for Talent Caravan. While a sportswriter, he covered spring training for the Los Angeles Dodgers in Vero Beach, Florida.

McGowan began at CJSS-TV in Cornwall in 1959, hosting the Dateline Cornwall interview show. In 1960, he co-hosted a special interview of Quebecois sportsperson and businessman Léo Dandurand, and hosted Teens Talk It Over to help teenagers discuss issues. He also hosted Youth in the Sixties, a special series investigating employment opportunities. In the community, McGowan was the staging director and producer of the Cornwall Theatre Club established in 1960, and led the Cornwall Collegiate and Vocational School drama club. He received the best supporting actor award for a Cornwall Theatre Club performance at the 1962 Eastern Ontario Drama Festival in Kingston.

=== CFCF-TV ===
==== 1962 to 1969 ====
1990s CFCF logo

McGowan began working for CFCF-DT in December 1962, as an announcer for promotions and advertisements. He hosted the interview show People in Conflict from 1962 to 1970, which featured actors portraying stories of misery. Presenting game shows, McGowan hosted A-Kin To Win which debuted in 1963, and Challenge for students which debuted in 1966. In sports, he co-hosted Montreal Minor Hockey weekly with Dick Irvin Jr. McGowan co-hosted coverage of the 1964 Santa Claus parade in Montreal, hosted Soundstage in the 1965–66 season, and co-hosted In Town, a satirical view of Montreal in the 1967–68 season.

In 1969, CFCF expanded its 6:00 p.m. newscast, Pulse, to a one-hour broadcast, with McGowan becoming the weather presenter for almost three decades. He also co-anchored the late night Pulse newscast from 11:18 to 11:45 p.m. For the 1969–70 season, he presented Montreal Bulletin Board, a comedy show with announcements of fake events and interviews to fill Canadian content requirements.

==== 1970 to 1987 ====
McGowan began hosting his eponymous talk show McGowan & Co. in 1970. The show was later known as McGowan's Montreal, and finally as McGowan's World, when production ended in 1987. By 1973, McGowan & Co. had begun filming interviews in various locations including Hollywood, Los Angeles. In April 1974, McGowan was suspended ten working days without pay, after he arranged a streaking incident during the taping of McGowan & Co., and the episode aired four days later prior to review by CFCF management. He received the best public affairs television award from the Montreal branch of the Association of Canadian Radio and Television Artists in 1975, for McGowan & Co. Commenting on the talk show, McGowan felt "it reflects more of my tastes than anything else I do" for CFCF.

Also in the 1970s, McGowan was a sidekick co-host of "Mr. Chips" a weekly show on home improvement and carpentry. He made a cameo appearance in the 1975 film, The Heatwave Lasted Four Days, and hosted the Canadian version of the game show, What's My Line?, which debuted in 1978.

==== 1987 to 1998 ====
McGowan was the executive producer of local programs at CFCF-TV from 1987 to 1994, and produced the annual Telethon of Stars to fund raise for children's hospitals in Quebec. He co-hosted Park Avenue Metro from 1988 until 1990, promoted as an infotainment program that featured interview and report segments by CFCF personalities.

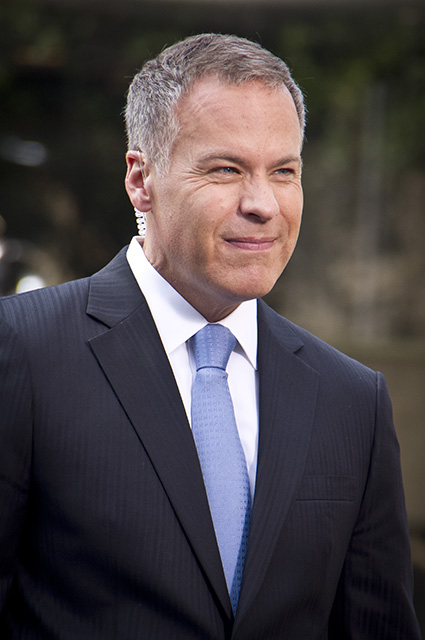
McGowan co-hosted Travel, Travel with Leslie Roberts (pictured)

In 1987, McGowan began co-hosting the series Travel, Travel, along with Leslie Roberts and Suzanne Desautels. Weekly episodes featured travel experiences at exotic locations around the world. By 1994, Travel, Travel was watched by 186,000 viewers in Montreal, was in broadcast syndication across Canada, and aired to 59 markets in the United States on the Travel Channel. Despite being rebroadcast by networks in United Kingdom, Middle East, Malaysia, and Afghanistan as of 1997, production of Travel, Travel ended after 10 seasons amid cost-cutting measures when the show became unprofitable due to labour costs.

When CanWest Global System expanded southeastward in 1996, McGowan was the face of CFCF's opposition to having another English-language television broadcaster in Montreal. Public relations efforts against CanWest included full-page newspapers advertisements, and press conferences urging viewers to join the campaign, prior to the Canadian Radio-television and Telecommunications Commission considering the sale of CKMI-DT where McGowan once worked. Less than two years later, he retired when his contract expired on February 1, 1998.

=== Reputation ===
McGowan thought of himself as a performer and enjoyed being in front of the camera. He was described by the Gazette television writer Mike Boone as a "consummate professional" with "total unpredictability". Remembered by his CFCF colleagues: Dick Irvin gave McGowan credit for the newscast's success, describing him as "serious yet mischievous"; and Bill Haugland stated that McGowan "had an offbeat sense of humour that endeared him to all of his viewers".

While presenting the weather, some of McGowan's antics included having the studio crew playfully throw snowballs at him, wearing a Montreal Expos uniform, and performing deadpan in a clown costume to promote the Shrine Circus. During the 1980 Quebec referendum, he stated that he did not want to influence how viewers would vote, then turned around to while wearing a jacket with a "no" sign on the back. He also created unique ways to introduce the weather, including "There's going to be frost in low-lying areas tonight—so cover up those low-lying areas", and "Tonight we're having a shower—and you're all invited".

== Personal life ==
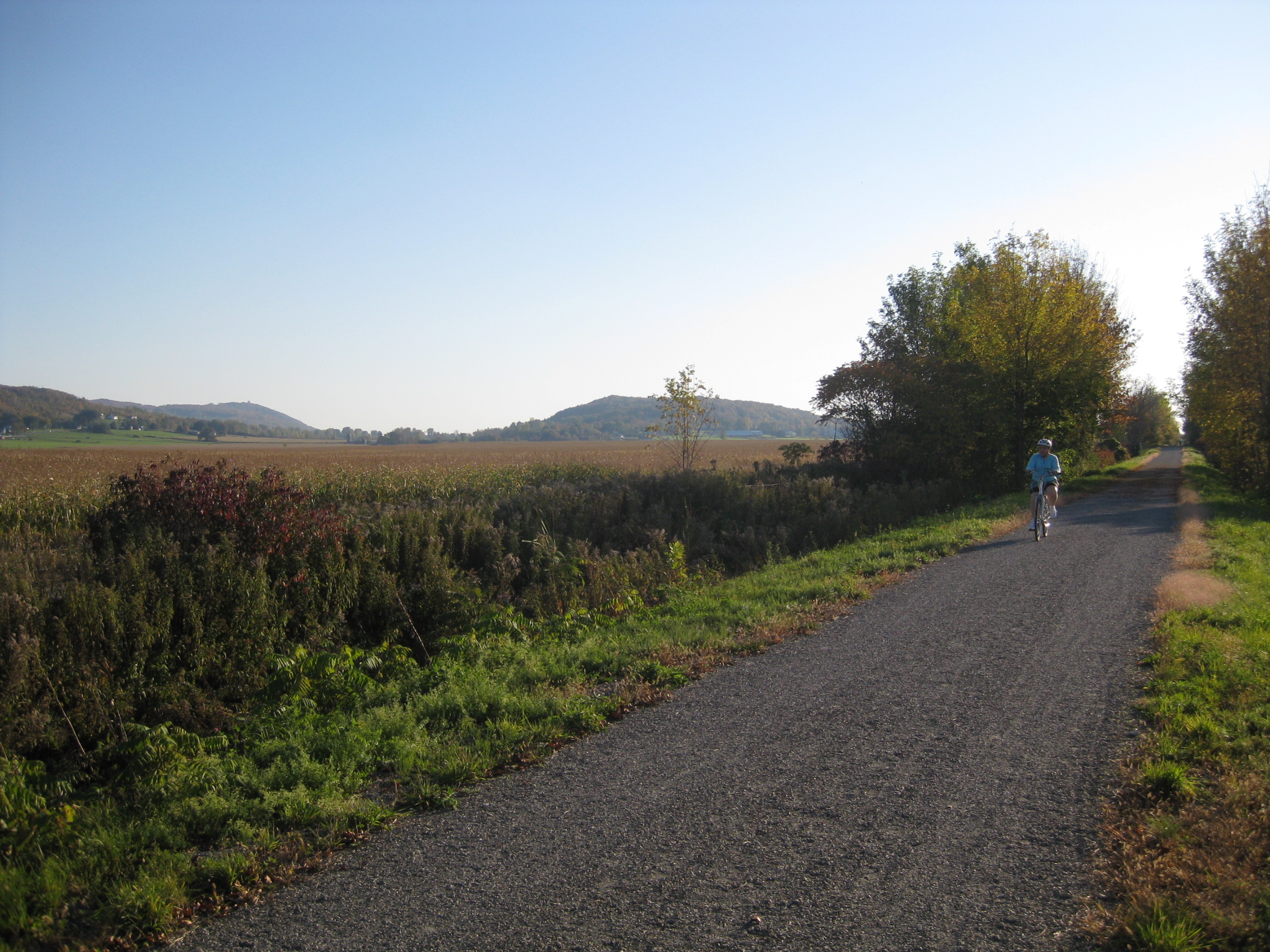
McGowan regularly cycled the Missisquoi Valley Rail Trail

McGowan's father wrote 42 years for the Montreal Star on baseball, Canadian football and ice hockey; retired in 1967, and died in 1973. McGowan's mother wrote 40 years for the Montreal Star including a column about women's sport, retired from journalism in 1970, and died in 1985.

In 1961, McGowan married Rosemary Vautier, and had son and a daughter. While working in Montreal, he lived in Pointe-Claire, and later in Beaconsfield, Quebec. Due to his work schedule, he often saw his family only weekends, or during the summer. His recreational activities included jogging and tennis.

McGowan owned a country home in Vermont, where he hiked the Long Trail, and visited his favourite part of Vermont, the Northeast Kingdom. He regularly cycled the Missisquoi Valley Rail Trail from St. Albans to Richford, and filmed an episode of "Travel, Travel" while cycling the Jay Peak area. He also frequented Cape Cod in summers, and owned property in Mexico.

After retiring, McGowan and his wife moved to the Brockville area in 2002, to be closer to their children. He was chairman of "Project Encore!" to renovate the Brockville Arts Centre, which raised more than $1.5 million in two years. His work for the Brockville Arts Centre earned him the Queen Elizabeth II Diamond Jubilee Medal in 2012.

McGowan died on February 27, 2023, at age 85 at Brockville General Hospital, after a brief illness.
