= Georgette Gagneux =

French athletics competitor

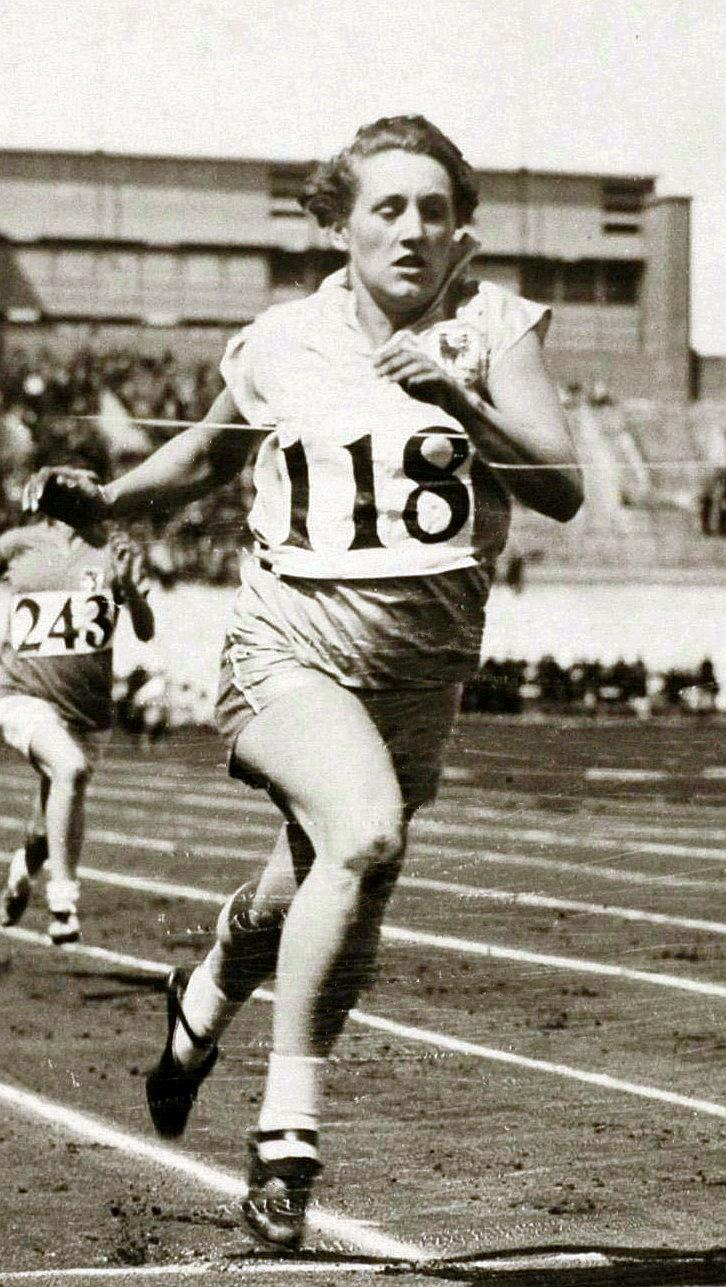
- Georgette Gagneaux winning 100 m preliminaries at the 1928 Olympics

Personal information
- Born: 17 June 1907 Etampes, France
- Died: 1 April 1931 (aged 23) Chamonix, France

Sport
- Sport: Athletics
- Club: Linnet's Saint-Maur, Saint-Maur-des-Fossés

Achievements and titles
- Olympic finals: 1928

Georgette Gagneux (French pronunciation: [ʒɔʁʒɛt gaɲø]; 17 June 1907 – 1 April 1931) was a French sprint runner who competed at the 1928 Olympics. She was eliminated in a semifinal of the 100 m event and finished fourth in the 4 × 100 m relay.

== Biography ==
Running for club Linnet's Saint-Maur, she won six French national track titles: two in the 80 metres, three in the Long Jump and one in the Shot Put.

1923 she participated in the third Women’s Olympiad in Monte Carlo winning brons in the sprint 60 metres event.

She participated in the 1928 Olympic Games at Amsterdam. A semi-finalist in the 100 m, she placed fourth in the 4 x 100 metres relay (alongside Yolande Plancke, Marguerite Radideau and Lucienne Velu).

On 15 July 1928 at Paris, she established a new world record in the 4 x 100 metres relay alongside her teammates from Linnet's Saint-Maur: Lucienne Velu, Simone Warnier et Marguerite Radideau, in the time of 50 seconds.

She also held the French national record in the Shot Put, Long Jump, 100m and also the 4 x 100m relay.

Elle died on 1 April 1931 at Chamonix at the age of 23.

=== International ===
Palmarès international
Date	Competition	Location	Result	Event	Performance
1928	Olympic Games	Amsterdam	4th	4 × 100 m	49.6 s

=== National ===
- French National Athletic Championships :
  - Gold medal in 80 metres in 1923 and 1929
  - Gold medal in Long Jump in 1925, 1928 et 1929
  - Gold medal in Shot Put 1929

== Records ==
Personal Bests
Event	Performance	Date
100 m	12.4 s	1929
Long Jump	5.41 m	1929
Shot Put	10.78 m	1929

== External References ==
- Picture Of Georgette Gagneux doing High Jump (Bibliothèque nationale de France – BnF)
