= Emy Pettersson =

Swedish sprinter

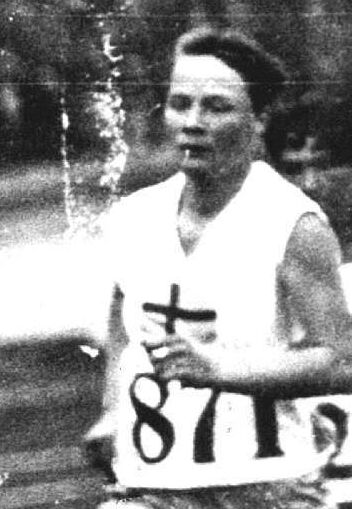
- Emy Pettersson in 1928

Personal information
- Nationality: Swedish
- Born: 22 November 1908
- Died: 8 May 1996 (aged 87)

Sport
- Sport: Athletics
- Event(s): 4 × 100 meters relay, 800 meters

Emy Pettersson (22 November 1908 – 8 May 1996) was a Swedish sprinter. She competed in the women's 4 × 100 metres relay and the 800 meters at the 1928 Summer Olympics and was eliminated in the preliminary heats in both events.
