= Myrtle Cook =

Canadian sprinter and journalist (1902–1985)

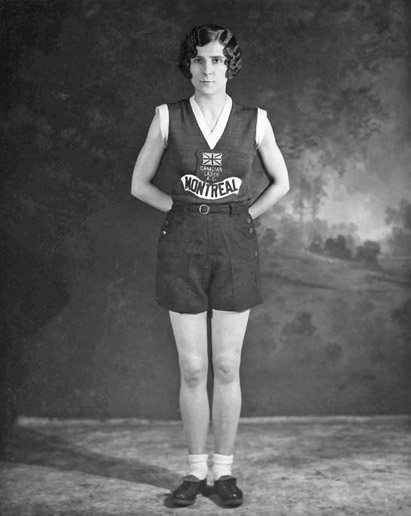
- Myrtle Cook, c. 1928

Personal information
- Full name: Myrtle Alice Cook
- Born: Myrtle Alice Cook; January 5, 1902 Toronto, Ontario, Canada
- Died: March 18, 1985 (aged 83) Elora, Ontario, Canada
- Height: 168 cm (5 ft 6 in)
- Weight: 55 kg (121 lb)
- Children: 2, incl. Don McGowan

Sport
- Country: Canada
- Sport: Athletics
- Events: 100 m, 4 × 100 m relay
- Club: Canadian Ladies' A.A.C.
Medal record
Women's athletics
Representing Canada
Olympic Games
Gold medal – first place	1928 Amsterdam	4 × 100 m relay

Myrtle Alice Cook (also competed as Myrtle McGowan) (January 5, 1902 – March 18, 1985) was a Canadian track and field athlete, journalist, and sports administrator who won a gold medal in the 4 × 100 metres relay at the 1928 Summer Olympics in Amsterdam. She competed as a member of Canada's first Olympic women's track and field team, later known as the "Matchless Six", which took part in the first Olympic Games to include women's athletics in 1928. Cook ran the anchor leg of the relay alongside Bobbie Rosenfeld, Ethel Smith, and Jane Bell, the Canadian team winning the event in a world-record time of 48.4 seconds.

Before the Olympics, Cook was one of Canada's leading female sprinters of the 1920s and held several national sprint titles. She competed primarily in short-distance events and was known for her strong finishing speed, which made her a natural choice for the final leg of the Olympic relay team.

After retiring from competition Cook became a sports journalist with the Montreal Star and later worked as a radio commentator and athletics administrator. She remained active in Canadian sport for decades and played a prominent role in promoting women's athletics in Canada. She married fellow sportswriter Lloyd McGowan, and was the mother of Montreal television personality Don McGowan.

== Early life and education ==
Myrtle Alice Cook was born on 5 January 1902 in Toronto, Ontario, Canada. Contemporary accounts describe her as a quiet and shy child who nevertheless threw herself into sport from an early age, playing whenever and wherever she could.

As a girl and teenager in Toronto, Cook developed into an all round athlete. Sources credit her with excelling in tennis, ice hockey, basketball, bowling, cycling and canoeing in addition to track and field. By her mid teens she was already competing at national level. At about the age of fifteen she was selected for Canada's national track and field team.

== Early athletic career ==
Cook emerged as one of Canada’s fastest sprinters in the early 1920s, a period when national opportunities for women in organized sport were still limited. In 1923 she co-founded the Toronto Ladies' Athletic Club, creating what has been described as the first dedicated women’s athletic club in Canada. That same year she began to attract national attention as a sprinter, winning provincial meets and setting unofficial marks that hinted at world-class ability.

Her breakthrough came in 1924, when she tied the world record in the 60-yard dash and was increasingly recognized as Canada’s best woman sprinter. Over the next few seasons she continued to dominate national competition, regularly winning the 100 metres, 220 yards, and relay events. Contemporary reports described her starts as "explosive" and her stride as unusually powerful for a runner of her size.

By 1927, Cook was considered a leading contender for the 1928 Amsterdam Summer Olympics, the first Games to include women’s track and field. She set multiple Canadian records in the run-up to the Games, and her consistent victories secured her place on the newly formed women’s national athletics team.

== 1928 Summer Olympics ==
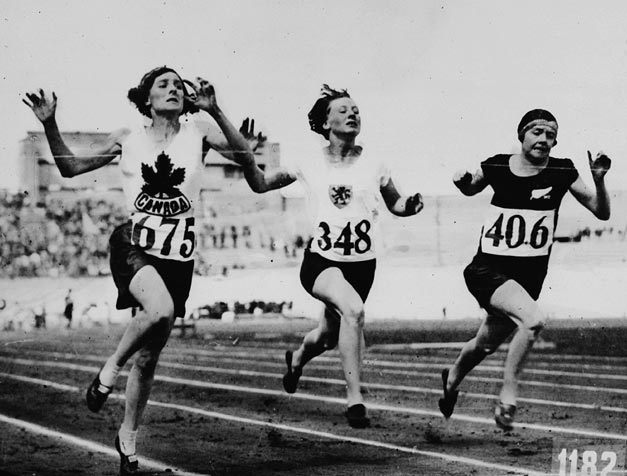
Cook (left) winning a preliminary heat of the women's 100 metres at the 1928 Summer Olympics in Amsterdam.

At the 1928 Summer Olympics in Amsterdam, Cook competed as a member of Canada's first Olympic women's track and field team. The Games marked the first time women's athletics events were included in the Olympic program, though their inclusion followed years of resistance and debate.

Only five events were opened to women: the 100 metres, 800 metres, high jump, discus throw, and 4 × 100 metres relay. Many officials and physicians questioned whether women should compete in strenuous events at all. Some medical authorities warned that competitive athletics might harm women's health or reproductive capacity. One widely circulated claim held that "excessive athletic effort may seriously disturb the normal functions of the female body".

Women's participation was also opposed by Pierre de Coubertin, founder of the modern Olympic Games. Coubertin believed the Games should remain a predominantly male arena and argued that women's role in sport ought to be limited. Writing in 1912, he described women's Olympic participation as "impractical, uninteresting, unaesthetic, and incorrect", and maintained that the Olympic Games should be "the solemn and periodic exaltation of male athleticism".

Pressure for inclusion came largely from women's sporting organizations. In the early 1920s, French sports leader Alice Milliat organized the Women's World Games, international competitions that demonstrated both the popularity and competitive standard of women's athletics. Their success placed increasing pressure on Olympic officials, who eventually agreed to introduce a limited program of women's athletics at the 1928 Games.

Cook arrived in Amsterdam as one of the favourites in the 100 metres. At the Canadian Olympic trials in Halifax, Nova Scotia, in July 1928 she ran 12.0 seconds, equalling the world record. She advanced through the early rounds but was disqualified in the final after two false starts, ending her chances of an individual medal. The race was won by American sprinter Betty Robinson, with Cook's Canadian teammates Bobbie Rosenfeld and Ethel Smith finishing second and third.

Cook returned in the 4 × 100 metres relay for women, a new event and the first women's Olympic relay ever contested. Running the anchor leg for the Canadian team alongside Bobbie Rosenfeld, Ethel Smith, and Jane Bell, she helped lead the team through the heats before winning the final on 5 August 1928 in a time of 48.4 seconds, setting both a world and Olympic record. The victory secured Canada's first Olympic gold medal in women's track and field and helped offset the disappointment of Cook's disqualification in the 100 metres final.

The 1928 Games proved to be a turning point for women's athletics. Canada had sent only seven women to the Games, six of them in track and field, yet they won four medals, an achievement that led the press to celebrate them as the "Matchless Six". Their performances helped establish Canada as a leading force in women's sprinting.

== Post-Olympic career ==
The year after the 1928 Summer Olympics, the first Olympics to include women's track and field events, Cook began a new career in journalism. In 1929 she joined the Montreal Star and launched a column titled In the Women's Spotlight. The column ran for more than forty years.

Cook used the column to report on women's athletics at a time when female competitors received little attention in mainstream sports coverage. She wrote about athletes in track and field, swimming, skiing, baseball, and ice hockey, profiled emerging competitors, and reported on amateur competitions across Canada.

Her writing also addressed the broader debate about women in sport. During the early twentieth century many critics argued that strenuous athletics were unhealthy or unfeminine for women. Cook publicly challenged those assumptions, as she wrote, “women have proved that they can compete in sport without losing their femininity.”

Cook remained active as an athlete as well. Three years after the 1928 Olympics, on 1 August 1931, she equalled the women's 100 metres world record of 12.0 seconds, matching the mark set by American sprinter Betty Robinson.

Beyond journalism and competition, Cook became an organizer and promoter of women's athletics. She helped establish the Toronto Ladies Athletic Club, served as director of athletics for the Canadian Ladies Athletic Club, and later founded a branch of the organization in Montreal.

Cook was also involved in the development of women's ice hockey. In 1933 she became the first president of the Dominion Women's Amateur Hockey Association, which worked to organize national competition for women's teams and promote the growth of leagues across the country.

During the Second World War, Cook remained active in public service. She participated in wartime fundraising efforts and assisted in training military recruits in the Montreal area, drawing on her experience as an athlete and coach.

== Personal life and death ==
Cook married fellow sportswriter Lloyd McGowan, with whom she had two sons. Lloyd McGowan wrote 42 years for the Montreal Star on baseball, Canadian football and ice hockey; retired in 1967, and died in 1973. Their son Don McGowan, became a television personality with CFCF-TV in Montreal.

Cook died in Elora, Ontario on March 18, 1985 at the age of 83.

== Legacy ==
=== Firsts for women ===
- Member of Canada's 4×100 metre relay team that won the gold medal at the 1928 Summer Olympics (Amsterdam), the first Olympic Games to include women's track and field events.
- Among the first Canadian women to compete in Olympic athletics following the International Olympic Committee's decision to admit women's track events in 1928.

=== Medals and competitive achievements ===
- Gold medal – 4×100 metre relay, 1928 Summer Olympics (Amsterdam), representing Canada.
- Fourth place – 100 metres final, 1928 Summer Olympics (Amsterdam).
- Canadian national champion – 100 yards (1928).
- Canadian national champion – 220 yards (1928).

=== Awards and honours ===
- Named Canada's female athlete of the year by the Canadian Press (1932).
- Inducted into Canada's Sports Hall of Fame (1955).
- Inducted into the Canadian Olympic Hall of Fame (1971).

=== Influence on women's sport and journalism ===
- Began serving as a sports columnist with the Montreal Star in 1929, becoming one of Canada's first nationally prominent female sports journalists.
- Organized the Montréal Major Ladies' Softball League and the Montréal Major Ladies' Hockey League, and formed a Montréal branch of the Canadian Ladies' Athletic Club, serving as its athletic director.
- Served as president of the Dominion Women's Amateur Hockey Association, and resigned from the position in September 1937 after four years on the association's executive.
- During World War II, served as track coach for the Canadian Armed Services in the Montréal area.

=== Cultural legacy ===
- Subject of the CBC Archives retrospective collection "The Matchless Six," documenting Canada's 1928 women's Olympic team.
- Profiled in historical accounts of early Canadian women's sport in The Canadian Encyclopedia.
