= Lucienne Velu =

French athlete and basketball player

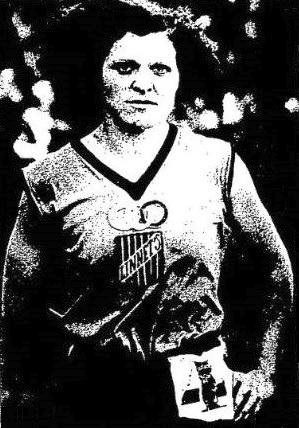
Lucienne Velu in 1934

Lucienne Velu-Chapillon, Mrs Odoul (born Lucienne Antoinette Velu; 28 January 1902 – 12 June 1998) was a French athlete and basketball player. She was inducted into the French Basketball Hall of Fame, in 2011. She was born Paris and died in Quincy-sous-Senart.

== Biography ==
=== Athletics ===
Velu held the world record in the discus throw in September 1924 at Paris with a throw of 30.225 m, and she was 14 times champion of France for 7 national records (her last record stood for 22 years). Her rivals were two other Frenchwomen, Lucie Petit-Diagre, a double world record holder in the summer of 1924, with throws of 27.70 m and 28.325 m, and Yvonne Tembouret, who was the world record holder in September 1923 at Paris with a throw of 27.39 m. In the shot put Velu was 8 times champion of France; her rival was Violette Morris. She was also the holder of three national records for 10 years and participated in the Olympic Games 1924, 1928 and 1936. She participated in the 1928 Olympic Games at Amsterdam and placed fourth in the 4 x 100 metres relay (alongside Yolande Plancke, Georgette Gagneux and Marguerite Radideau).

Finally, selected 24 times from 1923 to 1939 for French national teams, she won 43 titles as champion of France, including 33 senior championships for 47 podium visits. The events she won championships at were 80 (very close to the world record in 9 s 4), 100 and 200 meters, the discus, the shot put, relay (gold medal in the relay 4 × 200 m at the Women's World Games. In basketball (from 1928 to 1938) she won championships with the team Linnets (who won the first national championship). She was also part of the group that introduced handball into France before the war.

==== Prize list ====
- 33 titles at Senior French Athletic Championships:
  - 60 meters : 1934, 1935 and 1936
  - 80 meters : 1927, 1931, 1932 and 1933
  - 200 meters : 1927, 1928, 1929 and 1930
  - Shot Put : 1928, 1930, 1931, 1932, 1933, 1934, 1935 and 1937
  - Discus throw : 1925, 1926, 1927, 1928, 1929, 1930, 1932, 1933, 1934, 1935, 1936, 1937, 1939 and 1942
- 7 silver medals at the Senior Athletics Championships France
  - 80 meters : 1929
  - 100 meters : 1930
  - Shot Put : 1929, 1936, 1938
  - Discus throw : 1931, 1938
- 7 bronze medals at the Senior Athletics Championships France
  - 60 meters : 1937
  - 100 meters : 1928, 1935
  - Shot Put : 1925, 1927, 1939
  - Discus throw : 1941

==== Records ====
- World records :
  - World record holder discus (30.225 m in 1924)
- Records of France :
  - 3 times record holder of France shot put
  - 7 times record holder of France's discus throw
  - 3 times record holder of France's 4 × 100 Metres Relay

=== Basketball ===
Later, Velu was captain of the French basketball team that became the first women's team to be world champions in French sport, beating United States 34–23 on 11 August 1934 at the 4th Women's World Games in London at White Hall. The winning team was Gilberte Flouret-Picot, Yvonne Santais, Velu, Simone Richalot de Reims and Jeannine Garnier from Strasbourg. In 1930 during the 3rd World Games, Velu had already won the bronze medal in basketball.

==== French team ====
- World Champion 1934 (4th World Games);
- 3rd at the 3rd World Games in 1930 (and 1st European team);

==== Linnet's Saint-Maur ====
- Seven-time champion France, 1928, 1929, 1930, 1932, 1933, 1934 and 1938 (Then under the aegis of the FFBB.)

== Distinctions ==
- Female MVP of the Sports Academy in 1938
- Lifetime member of the French Basketball Academy under the 2012 promotion.
