= Jane Bell (athlete) =

Canadian sprinter (1910–1998)

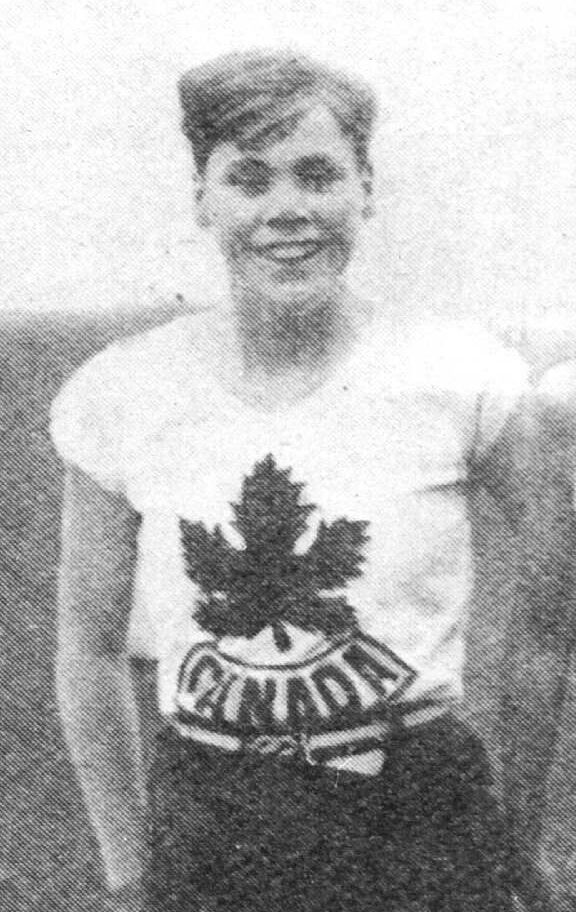
- Bell in 1928

Personal information
- Born: Florence Isabel Bell; June 2, 1910 Toronto, Ontario, Canada
- Died: July 1, 1998 (aged 88) Fort Myers, Florida, United States
- Height: 169 cm (5 ft 7 in)
- Weight: 58 kg (128 lb)
Medal record
Women's athletics
Representing Canada
Olympic Games
Gold medal – first place	1928 Amsterdam	4 × 100 m relay

Florence Isabel "Jane" Bell (June 2, 1910 – July 1, 1998) was a Canadian track and field athlete who competed mainly in the 100 metres.

== Career ==
From Toronto, Ontario, Bell competed for Canada in the 1928 Summer Olympics in Amsterdam, Netherlands in the 4 × 100 metres where she won the gold medal with her teammates Fanny Rosenfeld, Ethel Smith, and Myrtle Cook.

Outside of track, Bell was also a competitive swimmer, curler and golfer, and worked as a physical education teacher at the Margaret Eaton School of Physical Culture in Toronto.

== Death ==
Bell died in Fort Myers, Florida, aged 88.
