= Jessie Cross =

American sprinter

Olympic medal record

Women's athletics

Representing the United States
Silver medal – second place	1928 Amsterdam	4x100 m relay

Jessie Cross (April 14, 1909 – March 29, 1986) was an American athlete who competed mainly in the 100 metres.

She competed for the United States in the 1928 Summer Olympics held in Amsterdam, Netherlands in the 4 x 100 metres where she won the silver medal with her teammates Mary Washburn, Loretta McNeil and Betty Robinson.
