= Zinaida Liepiņa =

Latvian sprinter (1907–2000)

Zinaīda Liepiņa
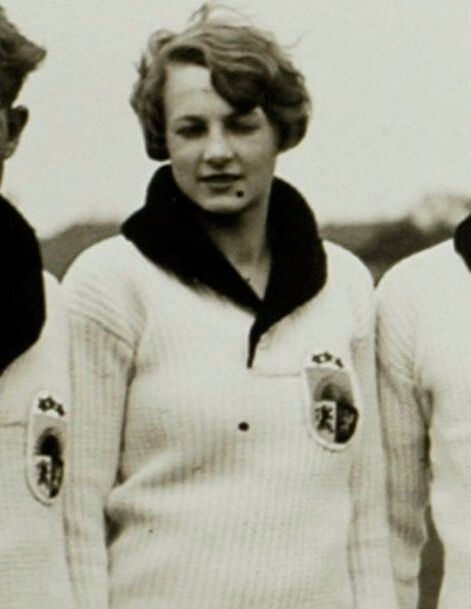
- Zinaida Liepiņa in 1928

Personal information
- Nationality: Latvian
- Born: 13 August 1907 Riga, Latvia
- Died: 15 March 2000 (aged 92) Lexington, Massachusetts, United States

Sport
- Sport: Sprinting
- Event: 100 metres

Zinaīda Liepiņa (13 August 1907 – 15 March 2000) was a Latvian sprinter. She competed in the women's 100 metres at the 1928 Summer Olympics. She was the first woman to represent Latvia at the Olympics.
