= Rose Van Crombrugge =

Belgian sprinter

Personal information
- Nationality: Belgian
- Born: 10 June 1911
- Died: 12 April 1988 (aged 76)

Sport
- Sport: Sprinting
- Event: 4 × 100 metres relay

Rose Van Crombrugge (10 June 1911 – 12 April 1988) as a Belgian sprinter. She competed in the women's 4 × 100 metres relay at the 1928 Summer Olympics.
