= Rosa Kellner =

German sprinter (1910–1984)

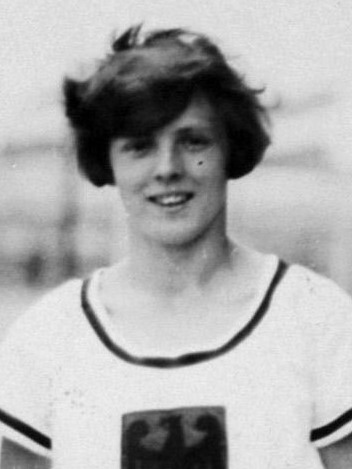
- Rosa Kellner (1928)

Personal information
- Born: 21 January 1910 Munich, German Empire
- Died: 13 December 1984 (aged 74) Munich, West Germany
Medal record
Women's athletics
Representing Germany
Bronze medal – third place	1928 Amsterdam	4 × 100 m relay
Women's World Games
Gold medal – first place	1930 Prague	4 × 100 m relay

Rosa Kellner (21 January 1910 – 13 December 1984) was a German athlete who competed mainly in the 100 metres. She was born in Munich.

Kellner competed for Germany at the 1928 Summer Olympics in the 4 × 100 metres relay, winning the bronze medal with her teammates Leni Schmidt, Anni Holdmann and Leni Junker. At the 1930 Women's World Games, she won the gold medal in the 4 × 100 metres relay event with teammates Agathe Karrer, Luise Holzer and Lisa Gelius.
