= Marguerite Radideau =

French sprinter (1907–1978)

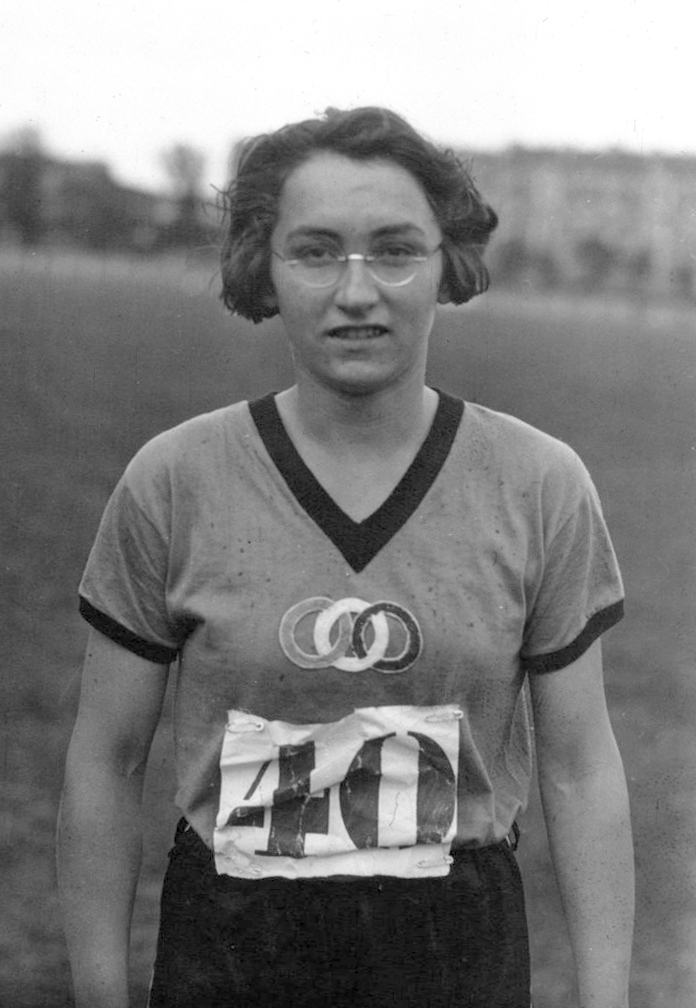
- Radideau in 1930

Personal information
- Born: 5 March 1907 Paris, France
- Died: 14 March 1978 (aged 71)

Sport
- Sport: Athletics
- Event: 60–250 m
- Club: Linnet's Saint-Maur, Saint-Maur-des-Fossés

Achievements and titles
- Personal best(s): 100 m – 12.4 (1926); 200 m – 26.2 (1926)
Medal record
Representing France
Women's World Games
Gold medal – first place	1926 Gothenburg	60 m
Gold medal – first place	1926 Gothenburg	100 yd
Silver medal – second place	1926 Gothenburg	4×110 yd relay
Bronze medal – third place	1926 Gothenburg	250 m

Marguerite Radideau (5 March 1907 – 14 March 1978) was a French sprinter and basketball player who participated in early women's international competitions. She won two gold, one silver, and one bronze at the 1926 Women's World Games and competed in the 1928 Olympic Games.

== Athletic career ==
Radideau competed at the 1924 Women's Olympiad winning the bronze medal in running 100 yards. She competed in 60–250 m events at the 1926 Women's World Games and won two gold, one silver and one bronze medal. She participated in the 1928 Olympic Games at Amsterdam, she placed fourth in the 4 x 100 metres relay (alongside Yolande Plancke, Georgette Gagneux and Lucienne Velu) and failed to reach the final of the 100 m event.

Radideau was also a basketball player for Linnet's de Saint-Maur and won three French Champion titles in 1928, 1929, and 1930. With the French national team, she competed in the 1930 European Championship where she won gold and in the 1930 World Championship in which she won silver. She was inducted into the French Basketball Hall of Fame in 2020.

Radideau stopped competing in 1931 after her marriage.

== Personal life ==
Radideau married Emile Schoebel, a diver who participated in the 1932 Summer Olympics, in 1931. Their son, Pierre Schoebel, was a French hurdler who participated in the 1968 Summer Olympics.
