= Lies Aengenendt =

Dutch sprinter

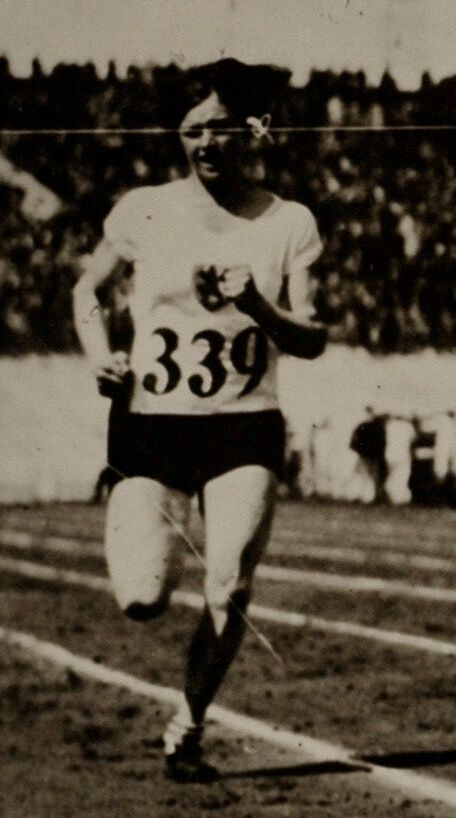

Personal information
- Nationality: Dutch
- Born: 10 July 1907 Nijmegen, Netherlands
- Died: 17 December 1988 (aged 81)

Sport
- Sport: Sprinting
- Event: 100 metres

Mechelina Agnes Elisabeth "Lies" Aengenendt (10 July 1907 – 17 December 1988) was a Dutch sprinter. She competed in the women's 100 metres at the 1928 Summer Olympics.
