= Bets ter Horst =

Dutch sprinter (1908–1997)

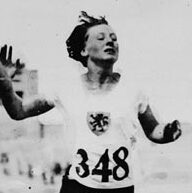

Personal information
- Nationality: Dutch
- Born: 2 February 1908 Hengelo, Overijssel, Netherlands
- Died: 9 March 1997 (aged 89) Hengelo, Overijssel, Netherlands

Sport
- Sport: Sprinting
- Event: 100 metres
- Club: AV Twente, Hengelo

Elisabeth "Bets" ter Horst (2 February 1908 – 9 March 1997) was a Dutch sprinter who competed at the 1928 Summer Olympics.

== Biography ==
At the 1928 Olympic Games, she competed in the women's 100 metres competition.

ter Horst finished second behind Elsie Green in the 80 metres hurdles event at the 1933 WAAA Championships.
