= Anni Holdmann =

German sprinter (1900–1960)

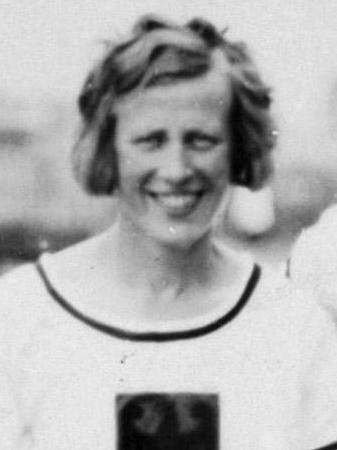
- Anni Holdmann (1928)

Personal information
- Born: 28 January 1900 Hamburg, German Empire
- Died: 2 November 1960 (aged 60) Hamburg, West Germany
Medal record
Women's athletics
Representing Germany
Bronze medal – third place	1928 Amsterdam	4 × 100 m relay

Anni Holdmann (28 January 1900 in Hamburg - 2 November 1960) was a German athlete who competed mainly in the 100 metres.

She competed for Germany in the 1928 Summer Olympics held in Amsterdam, Netherlands in the 4 × 100 metres where she won the bronze medal with her teammates Rosa Kellner, Leni Schmidt and Leni Junker.
