= Mary Washburn =

American sprinter

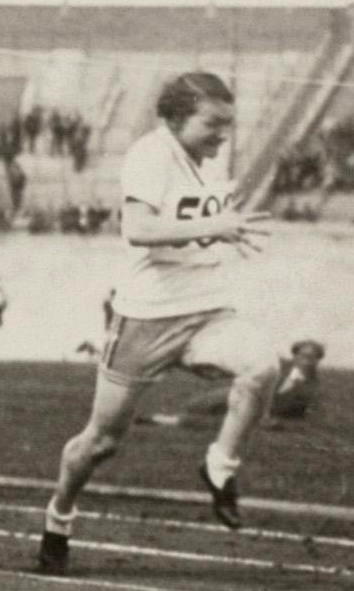

Medal record

Women's athletics

Representing the United States
Silver medal – second place	1928 Amsterdam	4x100 m relay

Mary T. Washburn (August 4, 1907 – February 2, 1994) was an American track and field athlete who competed mainly in the sprints.

She attended DePauw University in Greencastle, Indiana, graduating in 1928. She also graduated from New York University in 1929.

She competed for the United States track and field team in the 1928 Summer Olympics held in Amsterdam, Netherlands in the 4 x 100 metres where she won the silver medal with her teammates Jessie Cross, Loretta McNeil and Betty Robinson.
