= Matilde Moraschi =

Italian sprinter

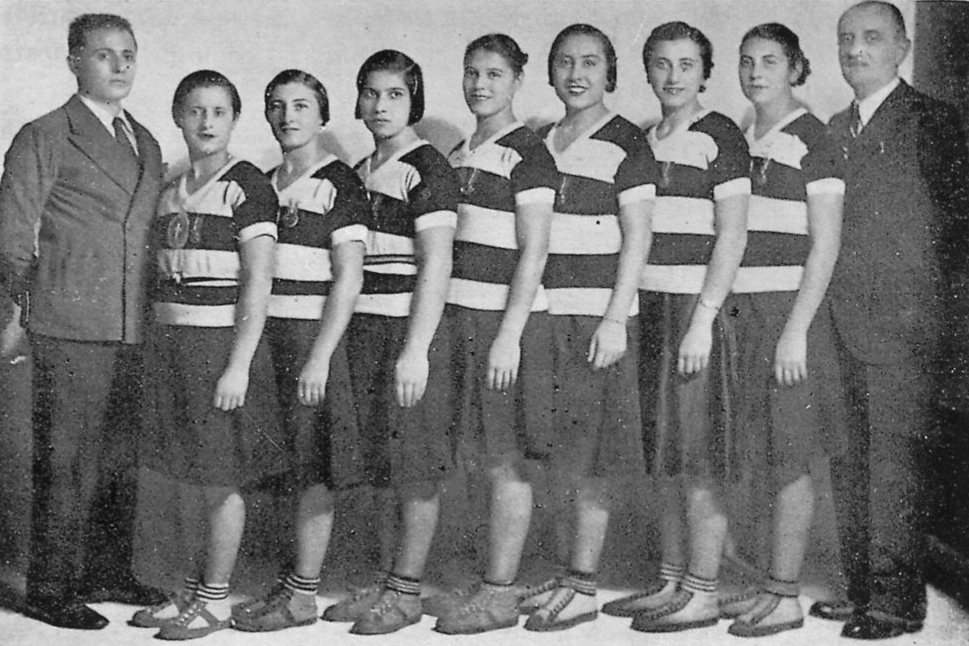
- The Canottieri Milano champion of Italy 1934; Moraschi is the third player from the right.

Personal information
- Nationality: Italian
- Born: 11 April 1910
- Died: 16 April 2004 (aged 94)

Sport
- Sport: Athletics
- Event: 100 metres

Matilde Moraschi (11 April 1910 – 16 April 2004) was an Italian sprinter and basketball player. She competed in the women's 100 metres at the 1928 Summer Olympics. her basketball teams were six times champions of Italy:

- Canottieri Milano: 1934 and 1935;
- Ambrosiana-Inter: 1936, 1937, 1937–1938 and 1938–1939.
