= Nettie Grooss =

Dutch sprinter

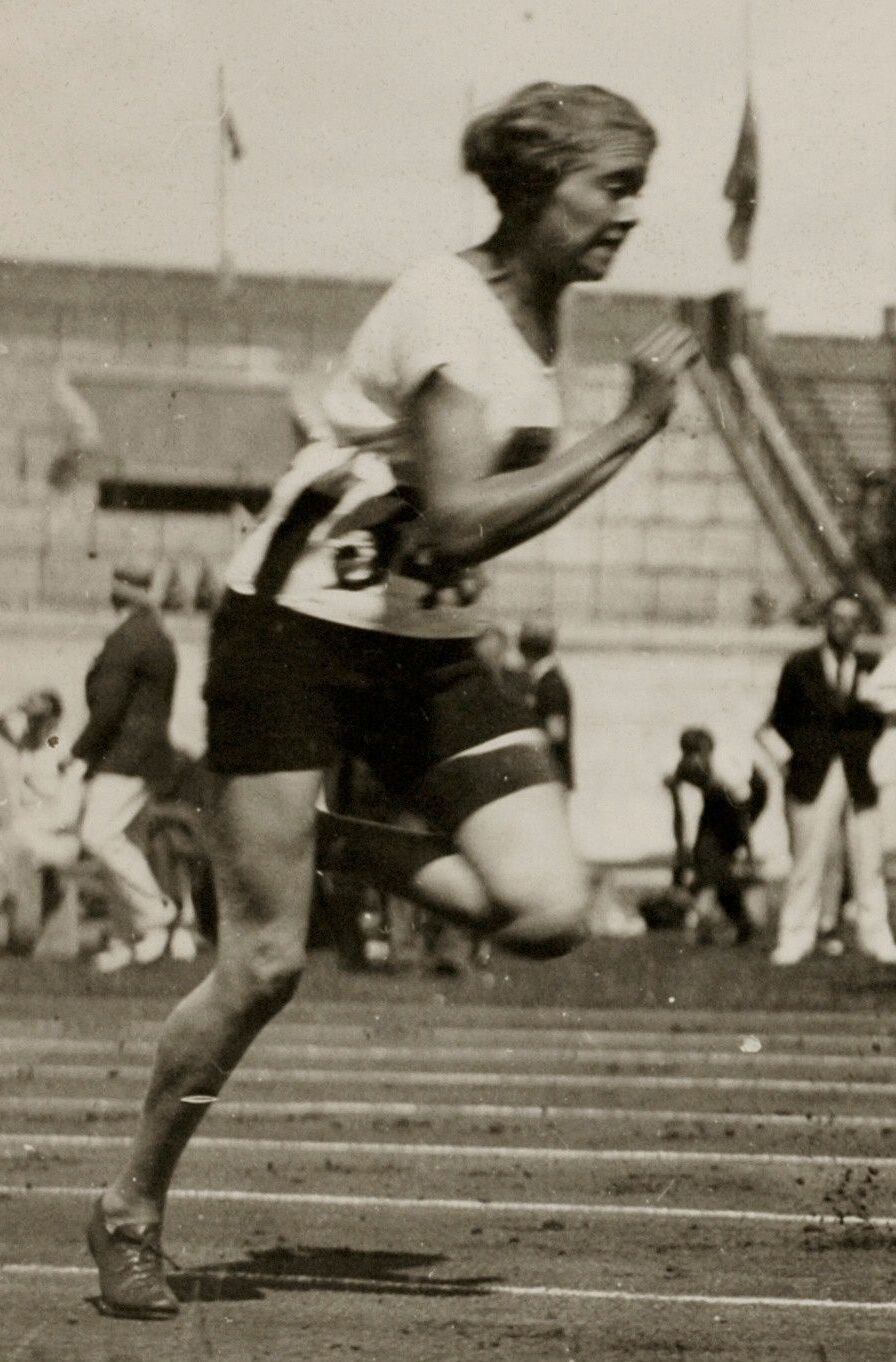
- Nettie Grooss in 1928

Personal information
- Nationality: Dutch
- Born: 2 August 1905 The Hague, Netherlands
- Died: 11 April 1977 (aged 71)

Sport
- Sport: Sprinting
- Event: 100 metres

Nettie Grooss (2 August 1905 – 11 April 1977) was a Dutch sprinter. She competed in the women's 100 metres at the 1928 Summer Olympics.

For a time in the 1920s Grooss was the best sprinter in the Netherlands. In 1926 Grooss became the 200 meter national champion, as well as setting Dutch records in both the 100 and 200 meters. In 1008 Grooss she won her second 200 meters national title, earning her a place on the Dutch Olympic team. At the Olympics Grooss ran in the 100 meters and the 4 × 100 meters relay.
