= Rie Briejèr =

Dutch athletics competitor (1910–1999)

Rie Briejer
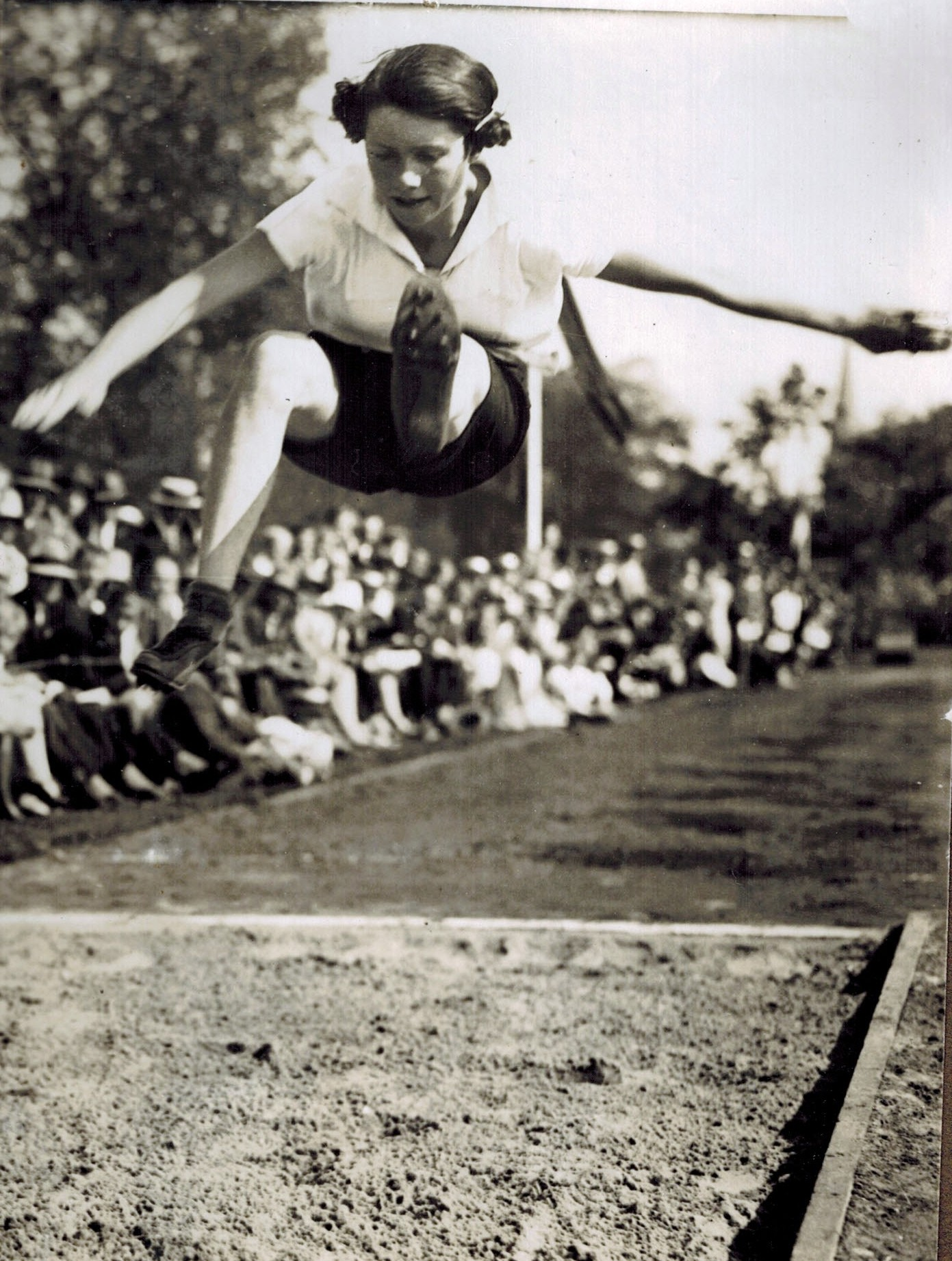
- Rie Briejer in action in The Netherlands in 1927.

Personal information
- Full name: Maria Wilhelmina Briejer
- Born: 10 March 1910 Leiden, the Netherlands
- Died: 11 July 1999 (aged 89) The Hague, the Netherlands

Sport
- Sport: Running
- Club: Nieuw Brunhilde, Leiden

Achievements and titles
- Olympic finals: 1928

Maria Wilhelmina "Rie" Briejer (10 March 1910 – 11 July 1999) was a Dutch sprint runner and long jumper. She competed at the 1928 Summer Olympics in the 100 m and 4 × 100 m relay and finished in fifth place in the relay.
