= Leni Schmidt =

German sprinter

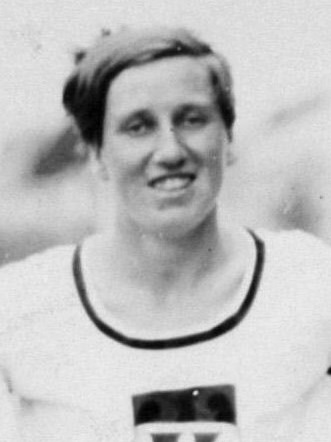
- Leni Schmidt (1928)

Personal information
- Full name: Helene Hermine Fischer-Schmidt
- Born: Helene Hermine Schmidt; 28 December 1906 Bremen, German Empire
- Died: 11 November 1985 (aged 78) Bremen, West Germany
Medal record
Women's athletics
Representing Germany
Bronze medal – third place	1928 Amsterdam	4 × 100 m relay

Leni Schmidt (born Helene Hermine Schmidt; 28 December 1906 – 11 November 1985) was a German athlete who competed mainly in the 100 metres. She was born and died in Bremen.

She competed for Germany in the 1928 Summer Olympics held in Amsterdam, Netherlands in the 4 × 100 metres where she won the bronze medal with her team mates Rosa Kellner, Anni Holdmann and Leni Junker.
