= Maud Sundberg =

Swedish sprinter

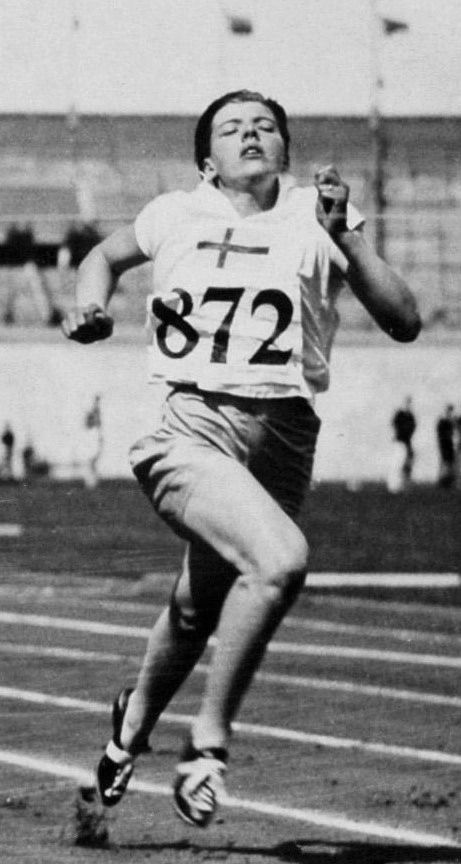
- Maud Sundberg at the 1928 Olympics

Personal information
- Full name: Maud Elisabeth Sundberg
- Born: 22 December 1911 Stockholm, Sweden
- Died: 30 November 2010 (aged 98) Djursholm, Sweden

Sport
- Sport: Athletics
- Event(s): Sprint, hurdles
- Club: IFK Enskede

Achievements and titles
- Olympic finals: 1928
- Personal best(s): 100 m – 12.7 (1928); 80 mH – 12.1 (1938)

Maud Elisabeth Sundberg (22 December 1911 – 30 November 2010) was a Swedish sprint runner. She competed at the 1928 Olympics in the 100 m and 4 × 100 m events, but failed to reach the finals. Sundberg won national titles in the 60 m (1927), 80 m hurdles (1931–34, 1936–39 and 1941–42) and 4×80 m relay (1930–33 and 1936–38), and held national records over 80 m, 100 m and 80 m hurdles. She married as Maud Nörklit and was the mother-in-law of Benny Andersson, a member of the rock group ABBA. At the time of her death she was the oldest Swedish Olympian.
