= Ruth Svedberg =

Swedish track and field athlete

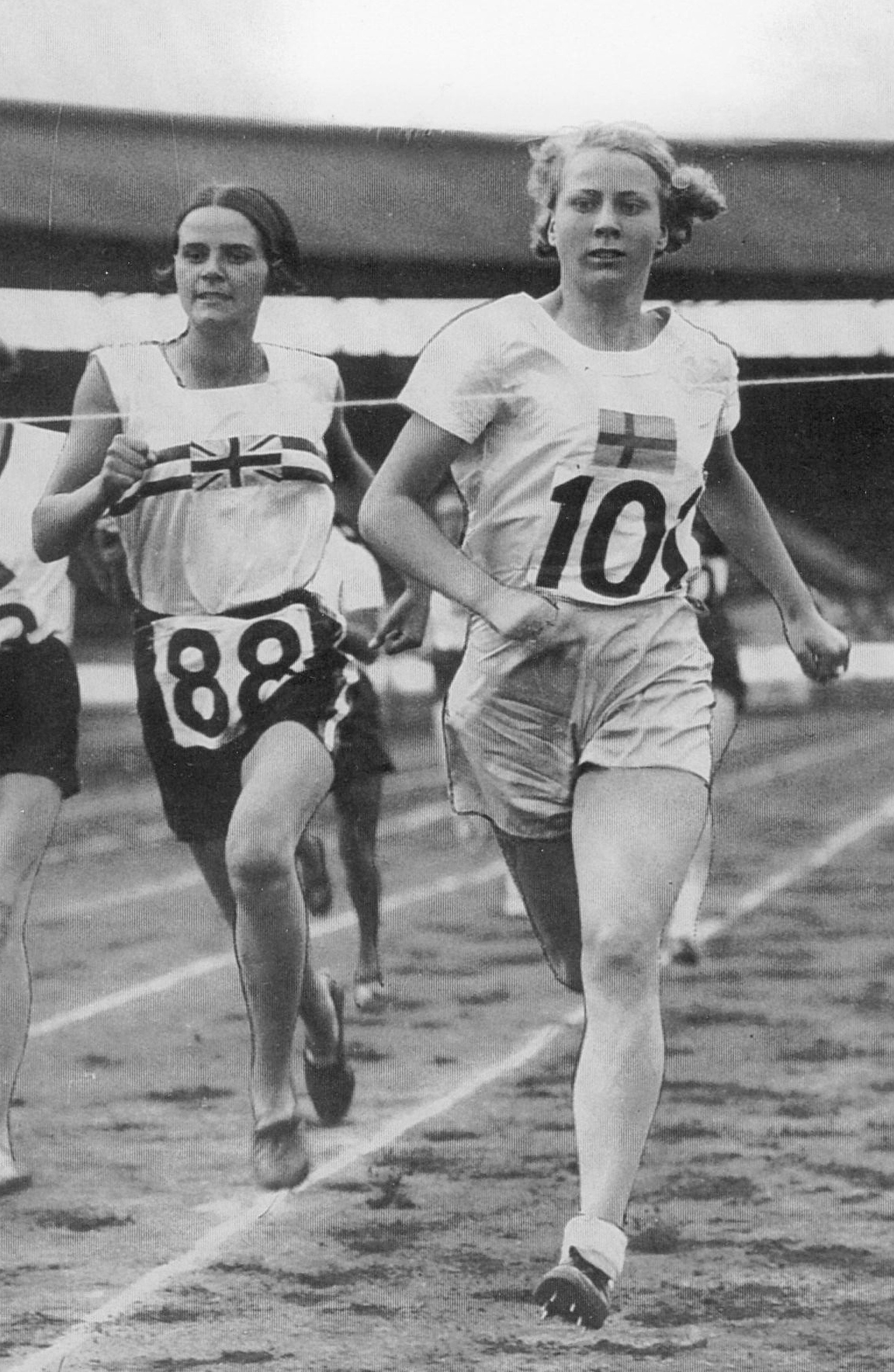
- Ruth Svedberg (right)

Personal information
- Born: 14 April 1903 Malmberget, Sweden
- Died: 27 December 2002 (aged 99) Gothenburg, Sweden

Sport
- Sport: Athletics
- Events: 100 m, discus throw, shot put, javelin throw, long jump
- Club: Kvinnliga IK Sport

Achievements and titles
- Personal bests: 100 m – 12.8 (1928); DT – 38.98 m (1949); SP – 12.09 m (1946); JT – 38.68 m (1934); LJ – 5.10 m (1933)
Medal record
Representing Sweden
Olympic Games
Bronze medal – third place	1928 Amsterdam	Discus throw
Women's World Games
Bronze medal – third place	1930 Prague	Triathlon

Ruth Augusta Svedberg (14 April 1903 – 27 December 2002) was a Swedish track and field athlete. She competed at the 1928 Summer Olympics in the 100 m, 4 × 100 m relay and discus throw events and won a bronze medal in the discus, failing to reach the finals in sprint events. Two years later she won the bronze medal in the triathlon at the third Women's World Games.

Svedberg held national records in the discus throw, shot put and triathlon and won the national championships in the long jump (1933), shot put (1933 and 1937), discus (1927, 1929–30, 1932–33 and 1949), javelin throw (1929, 1931 and 1933), triathlon (1929–31, 1933, 1937 and 1938), and in the 4×80 m (1939–41) and 4 × 100 m sprint relays (1943–45 and 1947). At her last national championships, aged 46, she won the discus throw event with her best-ever throw of 38.98 m. Three years earlier she set her personal best in the shot put while placing second at the national championships. Svedberg was a physiotherapist by profession.
