= Ethel Smith (athlete) =

Canadian sprinter

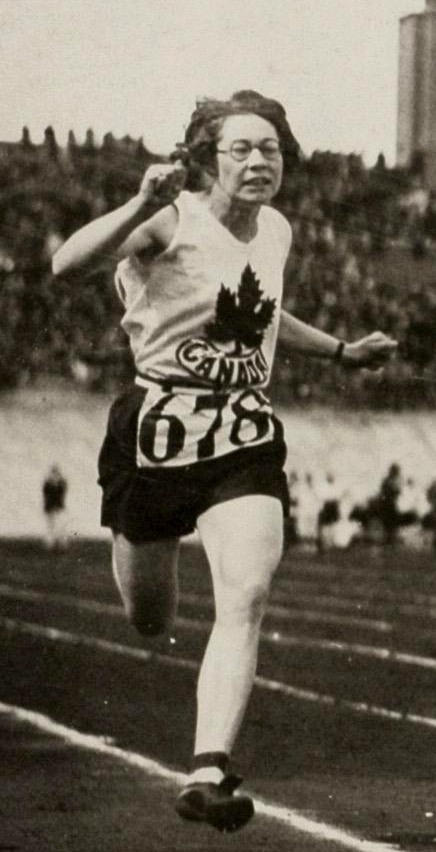
- Ethel Smith at the 1928 Olympics

Personal information
- Born: July 5, 1907 Toronto, Ontario, Canada
- Died: December 31, 1979 (aged 72) Toronto, Ontario, Canada
- Height: 1.65 m (5 ft 5 in)
- Weight: 54 kg (119 lb)

Sport
- Sport: Running
- Club: Parkdale Ladies' Athletic Club, Toronto

Ethel May Smith (July 5, 1907 – December 31, 1979) was a sprinter from Canada who won two medals at the Amsterdam 1928 Summer Olympics: a bronze medal in the 100 m, and a gold team medal in the 4 × 100 m relay.

Smith was born into a poor family and quit school in the eighth grade to work at the Toronto's Garment District. She won the 220 yards at the national championships in 1927 and the 60 yards at the Ontario Championships in 1929. The same year she retired from competitions.
