= Yolande Plancke =

French sprinter

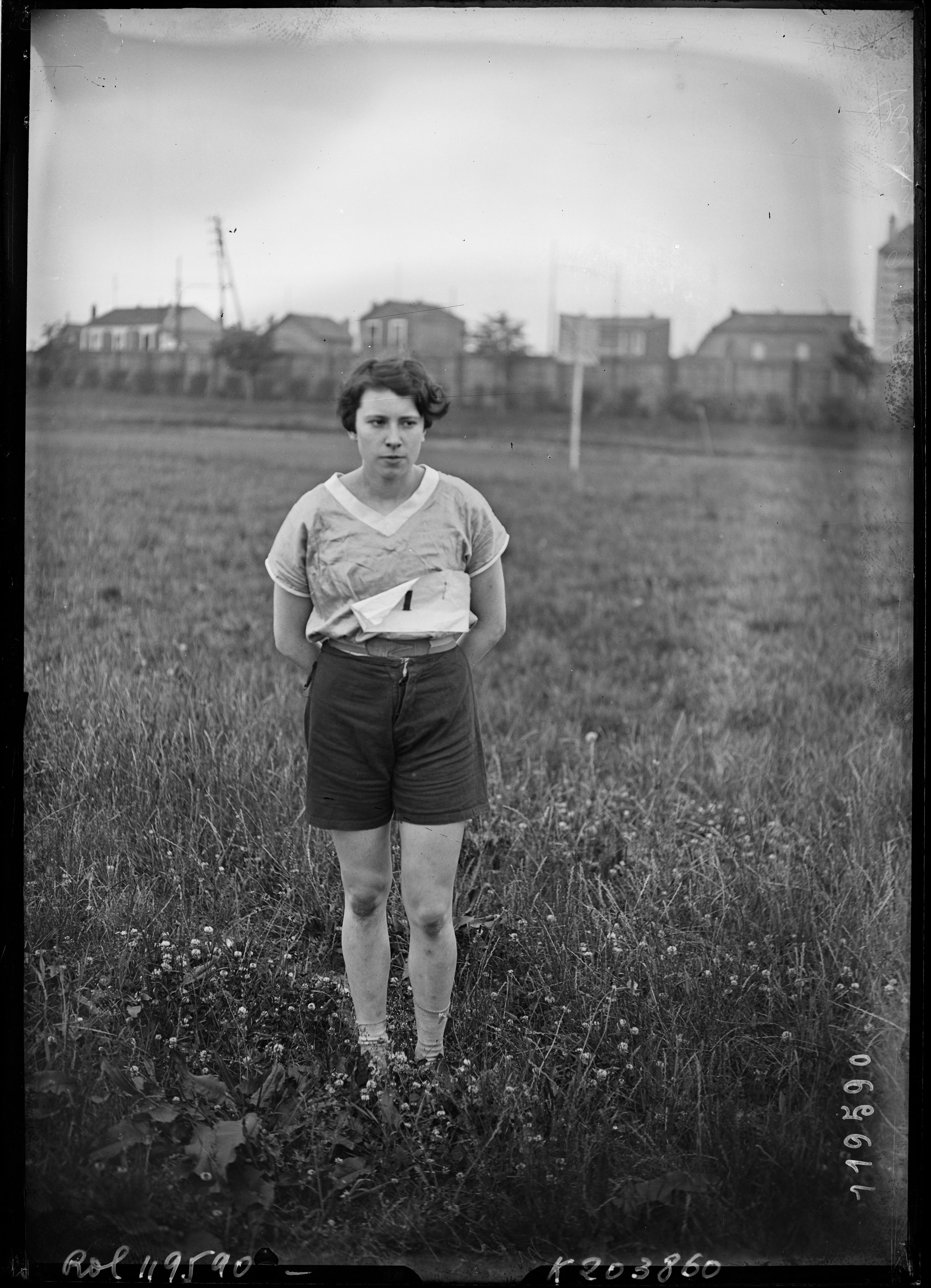
- Plancke in 1927

Personal information
- Nationality: French
- Born: 22 July 1908
- Died: 3 May 1991 (aged 82)

Sport
- Sport: Sprinting
- Event: 100 metres

Yolande Plancke (22 July 1908 – 3 May 1991) was a French sprinter. She competed in the women's 100 metres at the 1928 Summer Olympics.
