= Leni Junker =

German sprinter (1905–1997)

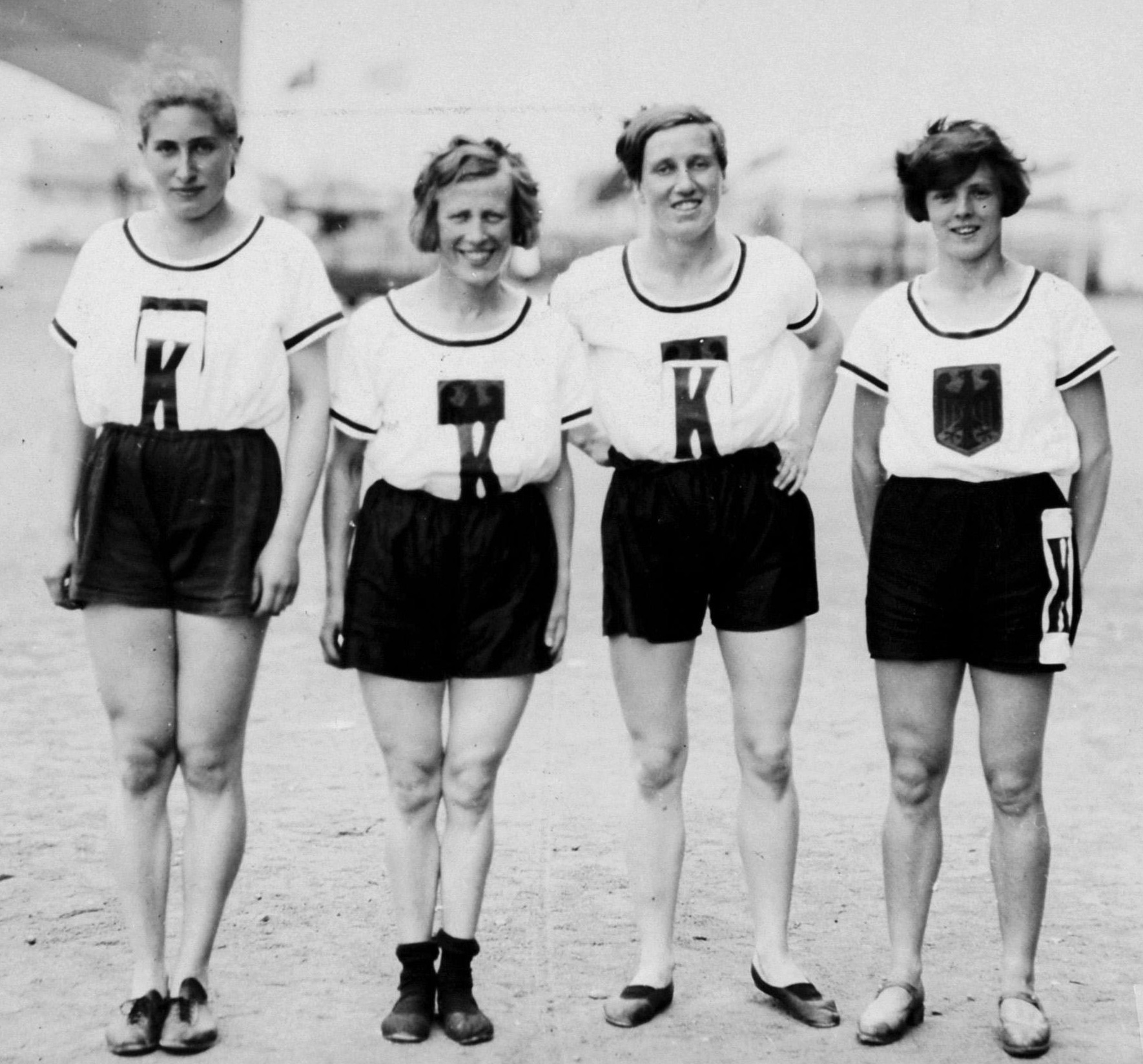
- Leni Junker (left) with the German 4 × 100 m team at the 1928 Olympics

Personal information
- Full name: Helene Junker
- Born: 8 December 1905 Kassel, Germany
- Died: 9 February 1997 (aged 91) Wilhelmshaven, Germany
- Height: 1.68 m (5 ft 6 in)
- Weight: 68 kg (150 lb)

Sport
- Sport: Running
- Club: Kasseler Turngemeinde
Medal record
Representing Germany
Olympic Games
Bronze medal – third place	1928 Amsterdam	4 × 100 m relay

Helene "Leni" Junker (later Thymm; 8 December 1905 – 9 February 1997) was a German sprint runner who competed at the 1928 Summer Olympics. She won a bronze medal in the 4 × 100 m, but failed to reach the final of the individual 100 m event. Earlier in 1925 she set a world record in the 100-metre at 12.2 seconds.
