= Betty Robinson =

American Olympic champion

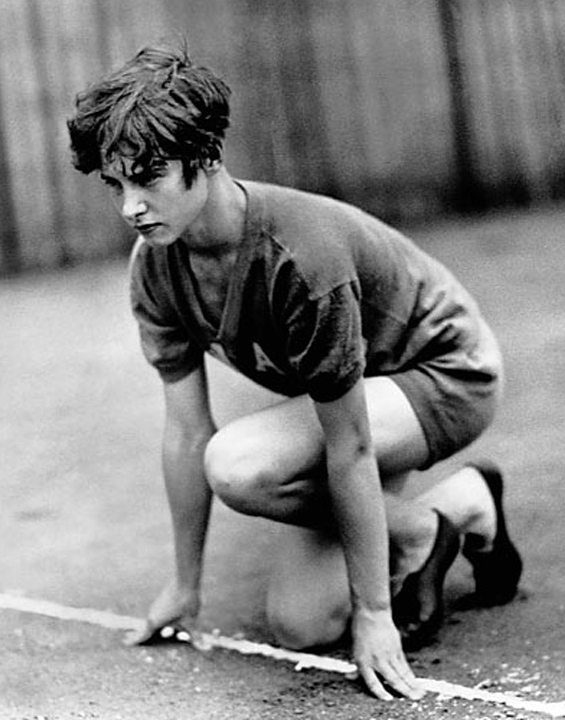

Personal information
- Born: Elizabeth R. Robinson; August 23, 1911 Riverdale, Illinois, US
- Died: May 18, 1999 (aged 87) Denver, Colorado, US
- Height: 5 ft 5 1/2 in (166 cm)
- Weight: 126 lb (57 kg)
- Website: bettyrobinson.org

Sport
- Sport: Athletics
- Event: Sprint
- Club: ICCW, Chicago

Achievements and titles
- Personal bests: 50 y – 5.8 (1929); 100 m – 12.0 (1928); 200 m – 25.5 (1931)
Medal record
Representing the United States
Olympic Games
Gold medal – first place	1928 Amsterdam	100 m
Gold medal – first place	1936 Berlin	4 × 100 m relay
Silver medal – second place	1928 Amsterdam	4 × 100 m relay

Elizabeth R. Schwartz (née Robinson; August 23, 1911 – May 18, 1999) was an American athlete and winner of the first Olympic 100 metres for women.

== Early life ==
Robinson was born in Riverdale, Illinois. She was a student at Thornton Township High School when she achieved national acclaim as an Olympic champion.

Her talent was discovered by her science teacher Charles Price, who saw her running to catch the train after school. He was a former athlete and the coach of the school team.

== Athletics ==
Robinson ran her first official race on March 30, 1928, at the age of 16, at an indoor meet where she finished second to Helen Filkey, the US record holder at 100 m, in the 60-yard dash. At her next race on June 2, outdoors at 100 meters, she beat Filkey and equalled the world record, though her time was not recognized because it was deemed wind-aided.

At the 1928 Amsterdam Olympics, her third 100 m competition, Robinson was the only female US athlete to qualify for the 100 m final. She reached the final and won, equaling the world record of 12.2 seconds. She was the inaugural Olympic champion in the event, since athletics for women had not been on the program before, and its inclusion was in fact still heavily disputed among officials. She remains the youngest athlete to win Olympic 100 m gold. With the American 4 x 100 metres relay team, Robinson added a silver medal to her record.

Six decades later, Robinson was interviewed for a book, Tales of Glory: An Oral History of the Summer Olympic Games Told By America's Gold Medal Winners, by Lewis H. Carlson and John J Fogarty. This is how she remembered the 100 m race:

I can remember breaking the tape, but I wasn't sure that I'd won. It was so close. But my friends in the stands jumped over the railing and came down and put their arms around me, and then I knew I'd won. Then, when they raised the flag, I cried.

Chicago Tribune reporter William L Shirer wrote that 'an unheralded, pretty, blue-eyed blonde young woman from Chicago became the darling of the spectators when she flew down the cinder path, her golden locks flying, to win'.

She joined Northwestern University where she decided to pursue a physical education degree, hoping to become a coach at the 1936 Olympics. Robinson joined the rifle team at Northwestern in addition to running track there. She was also a member of Kappa Kappa Gamma.

On 28 June 1931, Robinson was involved in a plane crash and was severely injured. Initial reports had her being discovered unconscious in the wreckage and wrongly thought dead by her rescuer; in fact, he merely thought she was beyond saving. He took her to Oak Forest infirmary, locally known as the "Poor Farm", because he knew the undertaker. Doctors determined she had suffered severe multiple injuries and she would never race again. It was another six months before she could get out of a wheelchair, and two years before she could walk normally again. Meanwhile, she missed the 1932 Summer Olympics in her home country.

Still unable to kneel for a normal 100 m start due to the fractures and surgeries on her left leg, Robinson was a part of the US team of 4 × 100 metres relay at the 1936 Summer Olympics. The US team was running behind the heavily favored Germans, but the Germans dropped their baton. Robinson took the lead and handed off the baton to Helen Stephens, resulting in her second Olympic gold medal.

== After athletic career ==
Retiring after the Berlin Olympics, Robinson remained involved in athletics as an official. She worked in a hardware store for many years. In 1977, she was inducted into the USA National Track and Field Hall of Fame. In 1996, she carried the Olympic Torch for the Atlanta Olympic Games.

== Personal life ==
She married and had two children. The family resided in Glencoe, Illinois, a suburb on Chicago's North Shore.

She died at age 87, suffering from cancer and Alzheimer's disease.

Records
Preceded by Kinue Hitomi	Women's 100 m world record holder June 2, 1928 – June 5, 1932	Succeeded by Tollien Schuurman
