= Poland at the 1928 Summer Olympics =

- IOC code: POL
- NOC: Polish Olympic Committee

in Amsterdam
- Competitors: 93 in 11 sports
- Flag bearer: Marian Cieniewski
- Medals Ranked 21st: Gold 1 Silver 1 Bronze 3 Total 5

Summer Olympics appearances (overview)
- 1924; 1928; 1932; 1936; 1948; 1952; 1956; 1960; 1964; 1968; 1972; 1976; 1980; 1984; 1988; 1992; 1996; 2000; 2004; 2008; 2012; 2016; 2020; 2024

Other related appearances
- Russian Empire (1900, 1912); Austria (1908–1912)

Poland competed at the 1928 Summer Olympics in Amsterdam, Netherlands. 93 competitors, 82 men and 11 women, took part in 44 events in 11 sports.

== Medalists ==
Medal	Name	Sport	Event
Gold	Halina Konopacka	Athletics	Women's discus throw
Silver	Michał Antoniewicz; Kazimierz Gzowski; Kazimierz Szosland	Equestrian	Team jumping
Bronze	Michał Antoniewicz; Karol Rómmel; Józef Trenkwald	Equestrian	Team eventing
Bronze	Tadeusz Friedrich; Kazimierz Laskowski; Aleksander Małecki; Adam Papée; Władysław Segda; Jerzy Zabielski	Fencing	Men's team sabre
Bronze	Leon Birkholc; Franciszek Bronikowski; Bolesław Drewek; Edmund Jankowski; Bernard Ormanowski	Rowing	Men's coxed four

== Athletics ==
Men
Track & road events

Athlete	Event	Heat		Quarterfinal		Semifinal		Final	
Athlete	Event	Result	Rank	Result	Rank	Result	Rank	Result	Rank
Klemens Biniakowski	400 m	50.8	3	Did not advance					
Józef Jaworski	1500 m	4:14.0	7	Did not advance					
Stefan Kostrzewski	400 m	52.2	4	Did not advance					
Stefan Kostrzewski	400 m hurdles	56.0	2 Q	—N/a		58.0	5	Did not advance	
Feliks Malanowski	800 m	1:59.8	5	Did not advance					
Wojciech Trojanowski	110 m hurdles	16.0	6	Did not advance					
Zygmunt Weiss	400 m	50.8	3	Did not advance					
Feliks Zuber	400 m	52.6	4	Did not advance					
Klemens Biniakowski; Stefan Kostrzewski; Zygmunt Weiss; Feliks Zuber	4 × 400 m relay	3:24.2	4	Did not advance					

Field events

Athlete	Event	Qualification		Final	
Athlete	Event	Distance	Position	Distance	Position
Józef Baran-Bilewski	Discus throw	41.77	18	Did not advance	
Zdzisław Nowak	Long jump	6.57	33	Did not advance	

Combined events – Decathlon

Athlete	Event	100 m	LJ	SP	HJ	400 m	100H	DT	PV	JT	1500 m	Final	Rank
Antoni Cejzik	Result	12.2	5.92	12.11	1.70	53.0	18.4	39.43	2.90	43.96	5:11.4	5415	18
Antoni Cejzik	Points	567	569	613	544	676	464	653	333	500	496	5415	18

Women
Track & road events

Athlete	Event	Heat		Quarterfinal		Semifinal		Final	
Athlete	Event	Result	Rank	Result	Rank	Result	Rank	Result	Rank
Gertruda Kilosówna	800 m	2:28.0	3 Q	—N/a				2:28.0	8
Otylia Tabacka	800 m	2:33.0	7	Did not advance					

Field events

Athlete	Event	Qualification		Final	
Athlete	Event	Distance	Position	Distance	Position
Genowefa Kobielska	Discus throw	32.72	8	Did not advance	
Halina Konopacka	Discus throw	39.17 OR	1 Q	39.62 WR	Gold medal

== Boxing ==
Men

Athlete	Event	1 Round	2 Round	Quarterfinals	Semifinals	Final	
Athlete	Event	Opposition Result	Opposition Result	Opposition Result	Opposition Result	Opposition Result	Rank
Stefan Glon	Bantamweight	Osvaldo Sánchez (CHI); L PTS	Did not advance				
Jan Górny	Featherweight	BYE	Frederick Volkert (CAN); W PTS	Lucian Biquet (BEL); L PTS	Did not advance		
Witold Majchrzycki	Lightweight	Sandor Szobolevszky (HUN); W PTS	Stephen Halaiko (USA); L PTS	Did not advance			
Jerzy Snoppek	Middleweight	BYE	Fred Mallin (GBR); L PTS	Did not advance			

== Cycling ==
Eleven cyclists, all men, represented Poland in 1928.

=== Road ===
Athlete	Event	Time	Rank
Stanisław Kłosowicz	Men's road race	5:51:31	57
Eugeniusz Michalak	Men's road race	5:37:02	49
Józef Popowski	Men's road race	5:55:39	61
Józef Stefański	Men's road race	5:47:15	54
Eugeniusz Michalak; Józef Stefański; Stanisław Kłosowicz; Józef Popowski	Team road race	17:16:35	13

=== Track ===
Sprint

Athlete	Event	Round 1	Repechage 1	Repechage Final	Quarterfinals	Semifinals	Final	
Athlete	Event	Opposition Time Speed (km/h)	Opposition Time Speed (km/h)	Opposition Time Speed (km/h)	Opposition Time Speed (km/h)	Opposition Time Speed (km/h)	Opposition Time Speed (km/h)	Rank
Jerzy Koszutski	Men's sprint	Van Massenhove (BEL); Knabenhans (SUI); 2 L	Donnelly (IRL); Plūme (LAT); W	Malvassi (ARG); Cozens (GBR); Knabenhans (SUI); W	Hansen (AUS); L 13.2	Did not advance		5

Time trial

Athlete	Event	Time	Rank
Józef Lange	Men's time trial	1:18.0	6

Team Pursuit

Athlete	Event	Round 1	Round 2	Semifinals	Final	
Athlete	Event	Time	Rank	Opposition Time	Opposition Time	Rank
Józef Lange; Alfred Reul; Jan Zybert; Józef Oksiutycz	Team pursuit	Belgium; L q	Netherlands; L	Did not advance		5

Tandem

Athlete	Event	Quarterfinals	Semifinals	Final	
Athlete	Event	Opposition Time Speed (km/h)	Opposition Time Speed (km/h)	Opposition Time Speed (km/h)	Rank
Stanisław Podgórski; Ludwik Turowski	Tandem	Hans Bernhardt; Karl Köther (GER); L12.4	Did not advance		5

== Equestrian ==
Five riders, represented Poland in 1928, all they won medals.

=== Eventing ===
Athlete	Horse	Event	Dressage		Cross-country			Jumping			Total	
Athlete	Horse	Event	Dressage		Cross-country			Final			Total	
Athlete	Horse	Event	Penalties	Rank	Penalties	Total	Rank	Penalties	Total	Rank	Penalties	Rank
Michał Antoniewicz	Moja Miła	Individual	144.50	39	1438.0	3	1582.50	4	240.0	16	1822.50	19
Józef Trenkwald	Lwi Pazur	Individual	184.70	25	1250.5	29	1435.20	6	210.0	20	1645.20	25
Karol von Rómmel	Donese	Individual	90.22	45	1240.0	30	1330.22	2	270.0	12	1600.22	26
Michał Antoniewicz; Józef Trenkwald; Karol von Rómmel	See above	Team	419.42	12	3928.50	5	4347.92	5	720.00	2	5067.92	Bronze medal

=== Show jumping ===
Athlete	Horse	Event	Qualification			Final			
Athlete	Horse	Event	Time	Penalties	Rank	Penalties	Rank	Penalties	Rank
Michał Antoniewicz	Readglet	Individual	1:31	6	20	Did not advance			
Kazimierz Gzowski	Mylord	Individual	1:33	0	4 Q	2	4	Did not advance	4
Kazimierz Szosland	Alli	Individual	1:40	2	13	Did not advance			
Michał Antoniewicz; Kazimierz Gzowski; Kazimierz Szosland	See above	Team	4:44	8	2	—N/a		8	Silver medal

== Fencing ==
Six fencers, all men, represented Poland in 1928.

Men

Ranks given are within the pool.

Fencer	Event	Round 1		Round 2		Quarterfinals		Semifinals		Final	
Fencer	Event	Result	Rank	Result	Rank	Result	Rank	Result	Rank	Result	Rank
Władysław Segda	Foil	Rozgonyi (HUN); L 1-5; Lion (AUT); L 2-5; Uggla (SWE); L 3-5; Garcia (ESP); L 2-5; Freund (YUG); W 5-1	5	did not advance							
Tadeusz Friedrich; Adam Papée; Aleksander Małecki; Kazimierz Laskowski; Władysław Segda; Jerzy Zabielski	Team sabre	Great Britain; W 11-5; United States; W 9-7	2 Q	—N/a				Italy; L 0-16; Belgium; W 9-7	2 Q	Hungary; L 4-12; Germany; W 9-7	Bronze medal

== Modern pentathlon ==
Three male pentathletes represented Poland in 1928.

Athlete	Event	Riding (show jumping)	Fencing (épée one touch)	Shooting (10 m air pistol)	Swimming (200 m freestyle)	Running (3000 m)	Total points	Final rank
Athlete	Event	Points	Points	Points	Points	Points	Total points	Final rank
Franciszek Koprowski	Men's	28	34	30	23	27	142	34
Zenon Małłysko	Men's	18	19	9	18	13	77	12
Stefan Szelestowski	Men's	26	12	35	1	36	110	26

== Rowing ==
Men

Athlete	Event	Round 1		Repechage		Round 2		Repechage		Round 3		Semifinal		Final	
Athlete	Event	Time	Rank	Time	Rank	Time	Rank	Time	Rank	Time	Rank	Time	Rank	Time	Rank
Franciszek Bronikowski; Edmund Jankowski; Leon Birkholc; Bernard Ormanowski; Bolesław Drewek	Coxed four	7:31.6	1 Q	BYE		7:47.6	1 Q	BYE		7:29.0	1 Q	7:29.0	1 Q	7:12.8	Bronze medal
Otto Gordziałkowski; Stanisław Urban; Andrzej Sołtan-Pereświat; Marian Wodziański; Janusz Ślązak; Wacław Michalski; Józef Łaszewski; Henryk Niezabitowski; Jerzy Skolimowski	Eight	6:37.0	1 Q	BYE		6:43.2	2	6:24.6	1 Q	6:42.2	5	Did not advance			

== Sailing ==
Men

Athlete	Event	Preliminary series				Net points	Final rank	Final series				Net points	Final rank
Athlete	Event	1	2	3	4	Net points	Final rank	1	2	3	4	Net points	Final rank
Władysław Krzyżanowski; Adam Wolff	12' Dinghy	8	8	DNS	7	33	17	Did not advance					

== Swimming ==
Men

Athlete	Event	Heat		Semifinal		Final	
Athlete	Event	Time	Rank	Time	Rank	Time	Rank
Władysław Kuncewicz	100 metre freestyle	1:10.8	29	Did not advance			

Women

Athlete	Event	Heat		Semifinal		Final	
Athlete	Event	Time	Rank	Time	Rank	Time	Rank
Róża Kajzer	200 metre breaststroke	3:45.2	20	Did not advance			

== Wrestling ==
Men's Greco-Roman

Athlete	Event	Elimination Pool							Final round	
Athlete	Event	Round 1 Result	Round 2 Result	Round 3 Result	Round 4 Result	Round 5 Result	Round 6 Result	Rank	Final round Result	Rank
Henryk Ganzera	−58 kg	Kurt Leucht (GER); L F	Ðula Sabo (YUG); L F	—N/a				14	Did not advance	
Leon Mazurek	−62 kg	Ernst Steinig (GER); L F	Aage Meyer (DEN); L F	—N/a				14	Did not advance	
Ryszard Błażyca	−67.5 kg	Tayyar Yalaz (TUR); L F	Alberto Barbieri (ARG); W F	Harald Pettersson (SWE); W F	Ede Sperling (GER); L F	—N/a		7	Did not advance	
Jan Gałuszka	−82.5 kg	BYE	Ejnar Hansen (DEN); W F	Adolf Rieger (GER); L F	—N/a			8	Did not advance	

== Art competitions ==
Athlete	Event	Category	Title	Rank
Kazimierz Wierzyński	Literature	Lyric works	Laur Olimpijski	Gold medal
Władysław Skoczylas	Painting	Drawings	Posters	Bronze medal
