= Deaths in September 1986 =

The following is a list of notable deaths in September 1986.

Entries for each day are listed alphabetically by surname. A typical entry lists information in the following sequence:

- Name, age, country of citizenship at birth, subsequent country of citizenship (if applicable), reason for notability, cause of death (if known), and reference.

== September 1986 ==
=== 1 ===
- Buddy Boone, 53, Canadian National Hockey League player (Boston Bruins).
- Tina Cooper, 68, English pediatrician (child abuse), cancer.
- Earl B. Dickerson, 95, American lawyer and politician (Hansberry v. Lee).
- Murray Hamilton, 63, American actor (Jaws, The Graduate), lung cancer.
- Colin McCathie, 76, Australian accountant and politician, member of the Legislative Assembly of Queensland (1950-1960).

=== 2 ===
- Frank Bartkus, 70, American Olympic soccer goalkeeper (1936).
- Arundhati Devi, 66, Indian actress, director, and singer.
- Thomas Butler Dowda, 87, American politician, member of the Florida House of Representatives (1941-1953).
- Mahmoud Kaveh, 25, Iranian military commander (Islamic Revolutionary Guard Corps), killed in action.
- Nuno Morais, 63, Portuguese Olympic sprinter (1948).
- Billy Taylor, 80, American jazz bassist, stroke.
- Jim Wilson, 64, American Major League baseball player (Boston/Milwaukee Braves), lung cancer.

=== 3 ===
- Vasantrao Ghatge, 70, Indian business magnate.
- Wirgiliusz Gryń, 58, Polish actor (Pastorale Heroica).
- Horace King, 85, British politician, Speaker of the House of Commons, stroke.
- Glennon T. Moran, 67, American WWII flying ace.
- Ted Moult, 60, British radio and television personality (Brain of Britain), suicide.
- Knocky Parker, 68, American jazz pianist.
- Vittorino Veronese, 76, Italian lawyer, director-general of UNESCO.
- Frank Corbett Welch, 86, Canadian politician, member of the Senate of Canada (1962-1975).
- Charles Edward Wyzanski Jr., 80, American district judge (Massachusetts).

=== 4 ===
- Christer Boustedt, 47, Swedish musician and actor.
- Sid Elliott, 71, Australian rugby league footballer.
- Roberto Gavaldón, 77, Mexican film director (Macario).
- Otto Glória, 69, Brazilian football manager (Benfica, Nigeria).
- Hank Greenberg, 75, American baseball player (Detroit Tigers), kidney cancer.
- Decio Klettenberg, 84, Brazilian Olympic rower (1936).
- Wayne Nance, 30, American serial killer ("The Missoula Mauler"), shot.
- Frank Stewart, 76, Australian rules footballer.
- Sid Tanenbaum, 60, American basketball player (New York Knicks), murdered.
- Walter Wanderley, 54, Brazilian organist and pianist ("Summer Samba"), cancer.
- Dov Zakin, 63, Polish-born Israeli politician, member of the Knesset (1969-1977, 1981-1984).

=== 5 ===
- Neerja Bhanot, 22, Indian flight purser, saved passengers from hijackers, shot.
- Alvin Heaps, 66, American labor union leader (Retail, Wholesale and Department Store Union).
- Noel Kempff Mercado, 62, Bolivian biologist and environmentalist, murdered.
- József Kiss, 77, Hungarian Olympic long-distance runner (1948).
- Niigiyama Tadashi, 46, Japanese sumo wrestler.
- Erich Schumacher, 77, German theater director.
- Ganapathi Thanikaimoni, 48, Indian palynologist, shot.
- Trần Quốc Hoàn, 70, North Vietnamese politician (Ministry of Public Security).

=== 6 ===
- Weston Bousfield, 82, American psychologist.
- Jacek Daniluk, 25, Polish Olympic equestrian (1980).
- William Littell Everitt, 86, American electrical engineer.
- George Gipe, 53, American author and screenwriter (Dead Men Don't Wear Plaid), allergic reaction to bee sting.
- John Stanley Grauel, 68, American priest and Christian Zionist leader.
- Suresh Joshi, 65, Indian Gujarati writer (Grihapravesh), kidney failure.
- George P. Monaghan, 85, American lawyer and commissioner of fire and police.
- Ernest Schmidt, 75, American college basketball player.
- Blanche Sweet, 90, American silent-screen actress (The Lonedale Operator, Judith of Bethulia), stroke.

=== 7 ===
- Skipper Bowles, 66, American politician and businessman, Lou Gehrig's disease.
- Les Bury, 73, English-born Australian politician, Minister for Foreign Affairs, Treasurer.
- Nelson Dunford, 79, American mathematician (Dunford–Pettis property).
- Antonín Gregor, 77, Czechoslovak politician.
- Spencer Le Marchant, 55, British politician, Member of Parliament.
- Monte McDaniel, 91, American football player and coach.
- Dan K. Moore, 80, American politician, Governor of North Carolina.
- Omar Ali Saifuddien III, 71, Bruneian royal, Sultan of Brunei.
- P. S. Ramakrishna Rao, 67, Indian filmmaker.
- Vladimir Vlasov, 83, Soviet composer and conductor.
- Hewitt T. Wheless, 72, American air force general.

=== 8 ===
- Ferenc Hatlaczky, 52, Hungarian Olympic sprint canoer (1956).
- Vladimír Janoušek, 64, Czech sculptor and painter.
- Ray Nazarro, 83, American film and television director and screenwriter (Bullfighter and the Lady).
- Idar Norstrand, 71, Norwegian civil servant.
- Alfred Schaefer, 81, Swiss banker, president of the Union Bank of Switzerland.
- Tomasz Stefaniszyn, 57, Polish Olympic footballer (1952, 1960).

=== 9 ===
- Kessler R. Cannon, 70, American politician and radio broadcaster, member of the Oregon House of Representatives.
- Robert Shackleton, 66, English philologist.
- Magda Tagliaferro, 93, Brazilian pianist, heart attack.
- Franciszek Tim, 62, Polish footballer.
- Andrew Zondo, 19, South African criminal, executed for murder.

=== 10 ===
- Pepper Adams, 55, American jazz saxophonist and composer, lung cancer.
- Dame Mary Austin, 86, Australian community worker and political activist.
- Jake Bornheimer, 59, American National Basketball Association player (Philadelphia Warriors).
- Deane Gundlock, 72, Canadian politician, member of the House of Commons of Canada (1958-1972).
- Kairyūyama Teruhisa, 47, Japanese sumo wrestler.
- María Dolores Katarain, 32, Spanish Basque separatist leader, murdered.
- Anna Koutsoyiannis, 53–54, Greek-born British microeconomist.
- Sobhi Mahmassani, 77, Lebanese lawyer and politician, Member of Parliament, lung cancer.
- Eddie Rodden, 85, Canadian NHL player.
- Ronnie Shade, 47, Scottish golfer.
- Harry Shafransky, 56, Canadian politician, member of the Legislative Assembly of Manitoba (1969-1977).
- Koji Shima, 85, Japanese actor, film director and screenwriter (Unforgettable Trail).

=== 11 ===
- Arthur Carr, 76, British Olympic equestrian bronze medalist (1948).
- Harry Haslam, 65, English footballer and manager (Sheffield United).
- Panagiotis Kanellopoulos, 83, Greek politician, Prime Minister, heart attack.
- Galo Miño, 33, Ecuadorian Olympic sports shooter (1984).
- Otho Nitcholas, 77, American Major League Baseball player (Brooklyn Dodgers).
- Felix Perrault, 70, American politician, member of the Massachusetts House of Representatives (1965-1979).
- Henry DeWolf Smyth, 88, American physicist and diplomat, participant in the Manhattan Project, cardiac arrest.
- Noel Streatfeild, 90, English children's author (The Circus Is Coming).
- Billy Walsh, 75, Australian rules footballer.

=== 12 ===
- Marcel Boigegrain, 57, French Olympic coxswain (1948).
- James Louis Connolly, 91, American bishop of the Diocese of Fall River.
- Ernst Haas, 65, Austrian-born American photojournalist, stroke.
- Jacques Henri Lartigue, 92, French photographer and painter.
- Manjula, 31, Indian actress in Kannada language films (Sampathige Savaal, Eradu Kanasu), suicide.
- Harold Moody, 70, British shot putter and Olympian.
- Frank Nelson, 75, American comedic actor (The Jack Benny Program), cancer.
- Ernst Paulus, 89, German Olympic athlete (1928).
- Earl Robinson, 79, Canadian NHL player.
- Gerhard Rohlfs, 94, German linguist.
- Jim Shilling, 72, American Major League Baseball player (Cleveland Indians, Philadelphia Phillies)
- Bruce Wardlaw, 72, Australian cricketer and footballer.
- Charlotte Wolff, 88, German-British sexologist, proponent of racist views.

=== 13 ===
- Antonio Mota, 47, Mexican footballer (Necaxa, Mexico).
- Neil Robinson, 24, Northern Irish racing cyclist, racing crash.
- Sam Shields, 57, Scottish footballer.
- Oscar Wight, 80, Guyanese cricketer.
- Roger Wrightson, 46, English cricketer.

=== 14 ===
- Charlie Adams 89, Australian rules footballer.
- William Edmund Barrett, 85, American writer (The Lilies of the Field).
- John Bingham, 32–33, Northern Irish loyalist soldier, shot.
- David Harold Byrd, 86, American oil executive.
- William Hall, 83, American actor.
- Dick May, 76, Australian rules footballer.
- Gordon McLendon, 65, American radio broadcaster, cancer.
- Robert Nisbet, 85, British Olympic rower (1928).

=== 15 ===
- Don Bennett, 76, Australian air vice marshal in the Royal Air Force and British politician, Member of Parliament.
- Jaroslav Burgr, 80, Czechoslavakian footballer (Sparta Prague, Czechoslovakia).
- Bill Butler, 66, Australian rules footballer.
- Virginia Gregg, 70, American actress (Dragnet), lung cancer.
- Eric Hiscock, 78, British sailor and author.
- Joseph M. Pettit, 70, American engineer and academic administrator, president of Georgia Tech, cancer.
- Elizabeth Titzel Riefstahl, 97, American archaeologist.
- Ramón Alberto Villaverde, 56, Uruguayan footballer (FC Barcelona).

=== 16 ===
- Jim Brough, 82, English footballer, rugby union and rugby league player (Leeds, Great Britain).
- Leobardo Candiani, 81, Mexican Olympic fencer (1932).
- Beppe Croce, 71, Italian Olympic sailor (1948).
- Puran Chandra Gupta, 74, Indian journalist (Dainik Jagran).
- Denis Guye, 85, English Olympic rower (1928).
- Darold Jenkins, 67, American college football player (Missouri).
- Walter Lehweß-Litzmann, 79, Nazi German Luftwaffe pilot, Knight's Cross of the Iron Cross recipient.
- Francesco Malatesta, 79, Italian Olympic cyclist (1928).
- Walter Matthews, 86, Canadian politician, member of the House of Commons of Canada (1958-1962).

=== 17 ===
- Erich Bautz, 73, German racing cyclist.
- Johnny Cook, 60, American CFL player.
- Alec Fraser-Brunner, 80, British ichthyologist, curator of the Van Kleef Aquarium, designer of the Merlion.
- Jon Gould, 33, American film executive, AIDS.
- Joe Kennedy, 60, English footballer (West Bromwich Albion).
- Pat Phoenix, 62, English actress (Coronation Street), lung cancer.
- Henrik Sjögren, 87, Swedish ophthalmologist, describer of Sjögren syndrome.

=== 18 ===
- Aljoša Buha, 24, Yugoslavian musician (Crvena Jabuka), traffic collision.
- Corita Kent, 67, American artist, ovarian cancer.
- Shelton Perera, 47, Sri Lankan tabla player and singer.

=== 19 ===
- Hubert Badanai, 91, Italian-born Canadian politician.
- Harry J. W. Belvin, American politician, chief of Choctaw Nation, member of Oklahoma House of Representatives and Senate.
- James H. Gray Sr., 70, American politician, mayor of Albany, Georgia, editor of The Albany Herald, heart attack.
- Ainslie Meares, 76, Australian psychiatrist, pneumonia.
- Ramón Orriols, 74, Spanish footballer.
- Lawrence Pendred, 87 British RAF officer.
- Wyatt Turner, 77, American baseball player.

=== 20 ===
- John C. Becher, 71, American actor, cancer.
- Christopher Butler, 84, English bishop.
- Chester A. Chesney, 70, American politician and NFL footballer (Chicago Bears), member of U.S. House of Representatives.
- Norman Chester, 78, British economist, warden of Nuffield College, Oxford.
- Ray Eddy, 75, American basketballer and coach.
- James Hardy, 63, American Olympic rower (1948).
- Iorgu Iordan, 97, Romanian linguist, diplomat and politician.
- Fred Macbeth, 76, Canadian Olympic sprinter (1928).
- Bob McChesney, 74, American NFL player (Boston/Washington Redskins).
- William W. Outerbridge, 80, American navy rear admiral, fired first shots in defence of U.S.A. in World War II.
- Dennis Spooner, 53, English television writer (Doctor Who), heart attack.
- Nicolae Testemițanu, 59, Soviet surgeon and politician, Minister of Health for Moldova.

=== 21 ===
- Jonah Barrington, 82, British journalist (Daily Express).
- George Brenlin, 58, American actor (Young and Dangerous).
- Cheryl Keaton, 36, American lawyer and murder victim.
- John Kuck, 81, American shot putter and Olympic gold medalist (1928).
- Clancy Williams, 43, American NFL footballer (Los Angeles Rams), cancer.
- Rex Woods, 94, British Olympic athlete (1924, 1928).

=== 22 ===
- József Asbóth, 69, Hungarian tennis player, French Open winner.
- Bernie Cummins, 86, American jazz drummer.
- Janet Davies, 59, English actress (Dad's Army), breast cancer.
- Yussuf Hamis, 65, Israeli Arab politician, member of the Knesset (1955-1965).
- Theodore H. McCrea, 78, American prelate.
- Sohan Singh Misha, 52, Indian Punjabi poet.
- Lloyd Peterson, 86, American college football, basketball, and wrestling coach.
- Erik Svensson, 83, Swedish Olympic athlete (1928, 1932).
- Abdel-Kader Zaaf, 69, Algerian racing cyclist.

=== 23 ===
- Gottfried Freiherr von Banfield, 96, Austro-Hungarian World War I flying ace.
- Theresa Sherrer Davidson, 92, American classicist and lawyer.
- Gordie Drillon, 72, Canadian ice hockey player (Toronto Maple Leafs).
- Bert Hodges, 81, Welsh cricketer.
- Sir Vincent Lloyd-Jones, 84, Welsh barrister and judge of the High Court.
- Domingo Moreno Jimenes, 92, Dominican writer.
- Johannes-Rudolf Mühlenkamp, 75, Nazi German Waffen-SS officer.
- C. A. Patrides, 56, American writer, AIDS.
- Percy Peter, 84, English Olympic swimmer and water polo player. (1920, 1924, 1928).

=== 24 ===
- Uell Stanley Andersen, 69, American NFL footballer (Cleveland Rams) and author (Three Magic Words).
- Maurice Delvart, 87, French Olympic sprinter (1920).
- Prudence Glynn, 51, British fashion editor and author, brain haemorrhage.
- Haskell Harr, 92, American percussionist, composer, and bandleader.
- Dorothy Pilley Richards, 92, English mountaineer and writer (Climbing Days).
- Harald Selås, 78, Norwegian politician.
- Adolf Tolkachev, 59, Soviet electronics engineer and double agent, executed.

=== 25 ===
- Geoff Alley, 83, New Zealand rugby union player and librarian.
- Ted Bishop, 73, American golfer.
- Bill Booth, 67, Canadian ice hockey player.
- Darshan Singh Canadian, 68–69, Indian Sikh trade unionist, murdered.
- John Carroll, 64, Canadian politician, member of the Legislative Assembly of Manitoba.
- Henning Helgesson, 86, Swedish footballer.
- Svante Johansson, 59, Swedish Olympic diver (1948).
- Bill Lever, 82, Australian rules footballer.
- Donald MacDonald, 77, Canadian politician, member of the Nova Scotia House of Assembly, cancer.
- Barney Mullan, unknown, Irish rugby union footballer.
- Marcel Rüedi, 47, Swiss mountain climber, died on a climb.
- Nikolay Semyonov, 90, Soviet physicist and chemist, Nobel laureate in Chemistry.
- Hubertus Strughold, 88, German-American physiologist and unconvicted war criminal (space medicine).
- Hans Vogt, 83, Norwegian linguist (Caucasian languages).
- James B. Wilson, 90, American football player and coach.

=== 26 ===
- Jacob Agus, 74, Polish-born American rabbi and theologian.
- Roger Howard Cilley, 68, American bishop.
- Wilson Faumuina, 32, American NFL footballer (Atlanta Falcons), heart failure.
- Hugh Franklin, 70, American actor (All My Children), cancer.
- Brian Desmond Hurst, 91, Irish film director (Scrooge).
- Billy Key, 90, British Indian Army general.
- André Maelbrancke, 68, Belgian racing cyclist.
- Noboru Terada, 68, Japanese Olympic swimmer (1936).

=== 27 ===
- Tony Acquaviva, 61, American composer and conductor, diabetes.
- Cliff Burton, 24, American bassist (Metallica), traffic collision.
- Jessie Eden, 84, British trade union leader.
- Michael Joseph Hogan, 78, Irish juror and judge, Chief Justice of the Supreme Court of Hong Kong.
- Richard Krygier, 69, Polish-born Australian publisher and journalist.
- Olga Masters, 67, Australian journalist (The Sydney Morning Herald, Manly Daily).
- George Nichols, 79, American boxer.
- Éva Ruttkai, 58, Hungarian actress, breast cancer.
- Chuck Sheerin, 77, American Major League Baseball player (Philadelphia Phillies).
- Georg Voggenreiter, 74, German racing cyclist, German National Road Race winner.

=== 28 ===
- Denis Carey, 77, British actor (A Beast With Two Backs, The Barchester Chronicles).
- Carmen De Rue, 78, American child actress and dancer, heart attack.
- Justo Gonzalo, 76, Spanish neuroscientist.
- Howard Graham, 88, Canadian army general, Chief of the General Staff.
- Sir Robert Helpmann, 77, Australian ballet dancer, choreographer and actor (Chitty Chitty Bang Bang), emphysema.
- Ewa Szelburg-Zarembina, 87, Polish novelist.
- Kiyoshi Tanimoto, 77, Japanese Methodist minister and Hiroshima survivor.
- Richard C. Turner, 58, American politician, member of the Iowa Senate, heart attack.
- Glauco Vanz, 66, Italian Olympic footballer (1948).
- Anthony Vince, 84, Canadian Olympic sprinter (1924).

=== 29 ===
- Les Field, 64, Australian rules footballer.
- Prince Georg of Denmark, 66, Danish royal and diplomat.
- Reg Goodwin, 78, British politician, leader of the Greater London Council.
- Artie Gore, 78, American baseball umpire.
- Maurice Harland, 90, British Anglican prelate, Bishop of Durham.
- M. D. H. Jayawardena, 71, Sri Lankan politician, Minister of Health, heart ailment.
- Betty Kean, 71, American actress, cancer.
- Moestopo, 73, Indonesian general.
- Al Passarell, 36, Canadian politician, British Columbia MLA (1979-1986), plane crash.
- Helmut Qualtinger, 57, Austrian actor and cabaret performer, liver disease.
- Theodor Schwenk, 75, German anthroposophist, water researcher and author (Sensitive Chaos: The Creation of Flowing Forms in Water and Air).

=== 30 ===
- Franz Burda, 83, German publisher (Hubert Burda Media).
- Arthur A. Cohen, 58, American novelist and theologian, leukemia.
- Storm Jameson, 95, English journalist and author (In the Days of Simon Stern).
- Nicholas Kaldor, 78, Hungarian-born British economist (cobweb model).
- Noel Kirsten, 60, South African cricketer.
- Laurier Lister, 79, English theatre writer, actor and director.
- Buster Millerick, 80, American racehorse trainer.
- Tommy Reynolds, 69, American jazz clarinetist.
- Kamaruzaman Sjam, 62, Indonesian communist activist, executed.
- Wilfrid Timms, 84, English cricketer and schoolteacher.
