= Wrestling at the 1928 Summer Olympics – Men's Greco-Roman bantamweight =

Men's bantamweight Greco-Roman wrestling at the Games of the IX Olympiad
- Venue: Krachtsportgebouw
- Dates: August 2–4, 1928
- Competitors: 19 from 19 nations

Medalists
1st place, gold medalist(s)		Kurt Leucht	Germany
2nd place, silver medalist(s)		Jindřich Maudr	Czechoslovakia
3rd place, bronze medalist(s)		Giovanni Gozzi	Italy

The men's Greco-Roman bantamweight was one of 13 wrestling events held as part of the wrestling at the 1928 Summer Olympics programme. It was the second appearance of the event. The competition was held from August 2 to 4, and featured 19 wrestlers from 19 nations. Bantamweight was the lightest category, including wrestlers weighing up to 58 kilograms (128 lb).

== Competition format ==
This Greco-Roman wrestling competition introduced an elimination system based on the accumulation of points. Each round featured all wrestlers pairing off and wrestling one bout (with one wrestler having a bye if there were an odd number). The loser received 3 points. The winner received 1 point if the win was by decision and 0 points if the win was by fall. At the end of each round, any wrestler with at least 5 points was eliminated.

== Results ==
=== Round 1 ===
Four wrestlers finished the round with 0 points (3 winners by fall, 1 bye). Six had 1 point after winning by decision. The nine bout losers each had 3 points. Zervinis withdrew after his bout.

Bouts

Winner	Nation	Victory Type	Loser	Nation
Giovanni Gozzi	Italy	Decision	Anselm Ahlfors	Finland
Alphonse Aria	France	Decision	Ibrahim Kamel	Egypt
Jindřich Maudr	Czechoslovakia	Decision	Herman Andersen	Denmark
Johannes van Maaren	Netherlands	Decision	Burhan Conkeroğlu	Turkey
Eduard Pütsep	Estonia	Fall	Georges Miller	Luxembourg
Oscar Lindelöf	Sweden	Fall	Eduardo Bosc	Argentina
Kurt Leucht	Germany	Fall	Henryk Ganzera	Poland
Sven Martinsen	Norway	Decision	Ðula Sabo	Yugoslavia
Ödön Zombori	Hungary	Decision	Georgios Zervinis	Greece
Piet Mollin	Belgium	Bye	N/A	N/A

Points

Rank	Wrestler	Nation	R1
1	Kurt Leucht	Germany	0
1	Oscar Lindelöf	Sweden	0
1	Piet Mollin	Belgium	0
1	Eduard Pütsep	Estonia	0
5	Alphonse Aria	France	1
5	Giovanni Gozzi	Italy	1
5	Sven Martinsen	Norway	1
5	Jindřich Maudr	Czechoslovakia	1
5	Johannes van Maaren	Netherlands	1
5	Ödön Zombori	Hungary	1
11	Anselm Ahlfors	Finland	3
11	Herman Andersen	Denmark	3
11	Eduardo Bosc	Argentina	3
11	Burhan Conkeroğlu	Turkey	3
11	Henryk Ganzera	Poland	3
11	Ibrahim Kamel	Egypt	3
11	Georges Miller	Luxembourg	3
11	Ðula Sabo	Yugoslavia	3
19	Georgios Zervinis	Greece	3*

=== Round 2 ===
Lindelöf and Leucht stayed at 0 points, winning their second match each by fall. Three additional men remained undefeated at 2–0 and 1 point after a win by fall and a win by decision; Zombori was 2–0 with 2 points because both wins were by decision. Mollins, who had a bye, was 0–1 with 3 points; also at 3 points were three men with a loss and a win by fall. Three men had a loss and a win by decision, with 4 points. Five were eliminated with 0–2 records (and 6 points) through two rounds.

Bouts

Winner	Nation	Victory Type	Loser	Nation
Anselm Ahlfors	Finland	Fall	Piet Mollin	Belgium
Giovanni Gozzi	Italy	Fall	Alphonse Aria	France
Jindřich Maudr	Czechoslovakia	Fall	Ibrahim Kamel	Egypt
Herman Andersen	Denmark	Fall	Burhan Conkeroğlu	Turkey
Eduard Pütsep	Estonia	Decision	Johannes van Maaren	Netherlands
Oscar Lindelöf	Sweden	Fall	Georges Miller	Luxembourg
Kurt Leucht	Germany	Fall	Eduardo Bosc	Argentina
Ðula Sabo	Yugoslavia	Fall	Henryk Ganzera	Poland
Ödön Zombori	Hungary	Decision	Sven Martinsen	Norway

Points

Rank	Wrestler	Nation	R1	R2	Total
1	Oscar Lindelöf	Sweden	0	0	0
1	Kurt Leucht	Germany	0	0	0
3	Giovanni Gozzi	Italy	1	0	1
3	Jindřich Maudr	Czechoslovakia	1	0	1
3	Eduard Pütsep	Estonia	0	1	1
6	Ödön Zombori	Hungary	1	1	2
7	Anselm Ahlfors	Finland	3	0	3
7	Herman Andersen	Denmark	3	0	3
7	Piet Mollin	Belgium	0	3	3
7	Ðula Sabo	Yugoslavia	3	0	3
11	Alphonse Aria	France	1	3	4
11	Sven Martinsen	Norway	1	3	4
11	Johannes van Maaren	Netherlands	1	3	4
14	Eduardo Bosc	Argentina	3	3	6
14	Burhan Conkeroğlu	Turkey	3	3	6
14	Henryk Ganzera	Poland	3	3	6
14	Ibrahim Kamel	Egypt	3	3	6
14	Georges Miller	Luxembourg	3	3	6

=== Round 3 ===
Gozzi won by fall, staying at 1 point. Leucht and Lindelöf each won by decision to gain their first point apiece, creating a three-way tie at 1 point. Zombori's bye kept him at 2 points. Pütsep's first loss took him from 1 points to 4. Maudr had 2 points. Andersen, who had lost in the first round, won again by fall to stay at 3 points. Ahlfors, who started the round tied with Andersen, won by decision to pick up his 4th point. Five men were eliminated: Mollin, at 0–2, had 6 points because of a bye; Sabo was also at 6 points at 1–2 with the win by fall; three others were 1–2 with 7 points because each one's win came by decision.

Bouts

Winner	Nation	Victory Type	Loser	Nation
Giovanni Gozzi	Italy	Fall	Piet Mollin	Belgium
Anselm Ahlfors	Finland	Decision	Alphonse Aria	France
Jindřich Maudr	Czechoslovakia	Decision	Johannes van Maaren	Netherlands
Herman Andersen	Denmark	Fall	Eduard Pütsep	Estonia
Oscar Lindelöf	Sweden	Decision	Ðula Sabo	Yugoslavia
Kurt Leucht	Germany	Decision	Sven Martinsen	Norway
Ödön Zombori	Hungary	Bye	N/A	N/A

Points

Rank	Wrestler	Nation	R1	R2	R3	Total
1	Giovanni Gozzi	Italy	1	0	0	1
1	Kurt Leucht	Germany	0	0	1	1
1	Oscar Lindelöf	Sweden	0	0	1	1
4	Jindřich Maudr	Czechoslovakia	1	0	1	2
4	Ödön Zombori	Hungary	1	1	0	2
6	Herman Andersen	Denmark	3	0	0	3
7	Anselm Ahlfors	Finland	3	0	1	4
7	Eduard Pütsep	Estonia	0	1	3	4
9	Piet Mollin	Belgium	0	3	3	6
9	Ðula Sabo	Yugoslavia	3	0	3	6
11	Alphonse Aria	France	1	3	3	7
11	Sven Martinsen	Norway	1	3	3	7
11	Johannes van Maaren	Netherlands	1	3	3	7

=== Round 4 ===
Zombori won by decision, receiving his 3rd point and eliminating Ahlfors with the latter man's second loss. Lindelöf similarly eliminated Andersen and picked up his 2nd point—and taking sole possession of the lead. Gozzi and Leucht, who had started tied with Lindelöf in first place at 1 point, each survived his first loss, to Maudr and Pütsep, and finished the round with 4 points. Maudr finished the round with 3 points after winning by decision. Pütsep was eliminated with 5 points despite winning in the round, as it was his second win by decision to go along with one prior loss.

Bouts

Winner	Nation	Victory Type	Loser	Nation
Ödön Zombori	Hungary	Decision	Anselm Ahlfors	Finland
Jindřich Maudr	Czechoslovakia	Decision	Giovanni Gozzi	Italy
Oscar Lindelöf	Sweden	Decision	Herman Andersen	Denmark
Eduard Pütsep	Estonia	Decision	Kurt Leucht	Germany

Points

Rank	Wrestler	Nation	R1	R2	R3	R4	Total
1	Oscar Lindelöf	Sweden	0	0	1	1	2
2	Jindřich Maudr	Czechoslovakia	1	0	1	1	3
2	Ödön Zombori	Hungary	1	1	0	1	3
4	Giovanni Gozzi	Italy	1	0	0	3	4
4	Kurt Leucht	Germany	0	0	1	3	4
6	Eduard Pütsep	Estonia	0	1	3	1	5
7	Herman Andersen	Denmark	3	0	0	3	6
8	Anselm Ahlfors	Finland	3	0	1	3	7

=== Round 5 ===
Leucht and Maudr were the only men to finish the round still in contention, the former after a bye and the latter after defeating Lindelöf. Gozzi was eliminated with 5 points despite winning, as the win by decision put him at the threshold. Lindelöf's first loss put him at 5 points as well, necessitating a bronze medal bout between him and Gozzi. Zombori finished in 5th place.

Bouts

Winner	Nation	Victory Type	Loser	Nation
Giovanni Gozzi	Italy	Decision	Ödön Zombori	Hungary
Jindřich Maudr	Czechoslovakia	Fall	Oscar Lindelöf	Sweden
Kurt Leucht	Germany	Bye	N/A	N/A

Points

Rank	Wrestler	Nation	R1	R2	R3	R4	R5	Total
1	Jindřich Maudr	Czechoslovakia	1	0	1	1	0	3
2	Kurt Leucht	Germany	0	0	1	3	0	4
3	Giovanni Gozzi	Italy	1	0	0	3	1	5
3	Oscar Lindelöf	Sweden	0	0	1	1	3	5
5	Ödön Zombori	Hungary	1	1	0	1	3	6

=== Round 6 ===
The final round featured a gold medal bout and a bronze medal bout. Gozzi beat Lindelöf on points to take the bronze medal. Leucht pinned Maudr to win gold.

Bronze medal bout

Winner	Nation	Victory Type	Loser	Nation
Giovanni Gozzi	Italy	Decision	Oscar Lindelöf	Sweden

Gold medal bout

Winner	Nation	Victory Type	Loser	Nation
Kurt Leucht	Germany	Fall	Jindřich Maudr	Czechoslovakia

Points

Rank	Wrestler	Nation	R1	R2	R3	R4	R5	R6	Total
1st place, gold medalist(s)	Kurt Leucht	Germany	0	0	1	3	0	0	4
2nd place, silver medalist(s)	Jindřich Maudr	Czechoslovakia	1	0	1	1	0	3	6
3rd place, bronze medalist(s)	Giovanni Gozzi	Italy	1	0	0	3	1	1	6
4	Oscar Lindelöf	Sweden	0	0	1	1	3	3	8
