= Wrestling at the 1932 Summer Olympics – Men's Greco-Roman featherweight =

Men's Greco-Roman featherweight at the Games of the X Olympiad
- Venue: Grand Olympic Auditorium
- Dates: 4–7 August 1932
- Competitors: 8 from 8 nations

Medalists
1st place, gold medalist(s)		Giovanni Gozzi	Italy
2nd place, silver medalist(s)		Wolfgang Ehrl	Germany
3rd place, bronze medalist(s)		Lauri Koskela	Finland

The men's Greco-Roman featherweight competition at the 1932 Summer Olympics in Los Angeles took place from 4 August to 7 August at the Grand Olympic Auditorium. Nations were limited to one competitor. This weight class was limited to wrestlers weighing up to 61kg.

This Greco-Roman wrestling competition followed the same format that was introduced at the 1928 Summer Olympics, using an elimination system based on the accumulation of points. Each round featured all wrestlers pairing off and wrestling one bout (with one wrestler having a bye if there were an odd number). The loser received 3 points. The winner received 1 point if the win was by decision and 0 points if the win was by fall. At the end of each round, any wrestler with at least 5 points was eliminated.

== Schedule ==
Date	Event
4 August 1932	Round 1
5 August 1932	Round 2
6 August 1932	Round 3 Round 4
7 August 1932	Final round

== Results ==
=== Round 1 ===
Gozzi had the first round's only win by fall, earning 0 points. The other three winners won by decision, with 1 point. The four wrestlers who lost had 3 points each, though Schack retired due to injury and did not continue to the second round.

Bouts

Winner	Nation	Victory Type	Loser	Nation
Kiyoshi Kase	Japan	Decision	Christian Schack	Denmark
Jindřich Maudr	Czechoslovakia	Decision	Oscar Lindelöf	Sweden
Wolfgang Ehrl	Germany	Decision	Ödön Zombori	Hungary
Giovanni Gozzi	Italy	Fall	Lauri Koskela	Finland

Points

Rank	Wrestler	Nation	Start	Earned	Total
1	Giovanni Gozzi	Italy	0	0	0
2	Wolfgang Ehrl	Germany	0	1	1
2	Kase Kiyoshi	Japan	0	1	1
2	Jindřich Maudr	Czechoslovakia	0	1	1
5	Lauri Koskela	Finland	0	3	3
5	Oscar Lindelöf	Sweden	0	3	3
5	Ödön Zombori	Hungary	0	3	3
8	Christian Schack	Denmark	0	3	3r

=== Round 2 ===
Gozzi had a bye due to Schack's retirement, staying as the only wrestler with 0 points. Maudr's second win came by fall, as he stayed at 1 point. Koskela also won by fall, staying at 3 points after his first-round loss. Ehrl won his second consecutive decision, picking up a second point. Kiyoshi, starting with 1 point, lost to go to 4 points. Lindelöf and Zombori, the latter forfeiting due to injury, each fell to 0–2 and were eliminated.

Bouts

Winner	Nation	Victory Type	Loser	Nation
Jindřich Maudr	Czechoslovakia	Fall	Kase Kiyoshi	Japan
Wolfgang Ehrl	Germany	Decision	Oscar Lindelöf	Sweden
Lauri Koskela	Finland	Fall	Ödön Zombori	Hungary
Giovanni Gozzi	Italy	Bye	N/A	N/A

Points

Rank	Wrestler	Nation	Start	Earned	Total
1	Giovanni Gozzi	Italy	0	0	0
2	Jindřich Maudr	Czechoslovakia	1	0	1
3	Wolfgang Ehrl	Germany	1	1	2
4	Lauri Koskela	Finland	3	0	3
5	Kase Kiyoshi	Japan	1	3	4
6	Oscar Lindelöf	Sweden	3	3	6
6	Ödön Zombori	Hungary	3	3	6

=== Round 3 ===
Koskela had the bye this round, staying at 3 points. Gozzi continued his pointless streak, winning by fall over Kase, who was eliminated. Ehrl won a third consecutive bout by decision, moving to 3 points. Maudr's loss brought him to 4 points and the brink of elimination.

Bouts

Winner	Nation	Victory Type	Loser	Nation
Giovanni Gozzi	Italy	Fall	Kase Kiyoshi	Japan
Wolfgang Ehrl	Germany	Decision	Jindřich Maudr	Czechoslovakia
Lauri Koskela	Finland	Bye	N/A	N/A

Points

Rank	Wrestler	Nation	Start	Earned	Total
1	Giovanni Gozzi	Italy	0	0	0
2	Wolfgang Ehrl	Germany	2	1	3
2	Lauri Koskela	Finland	3	0	3
4	Jindřich Maudr	Czechoslovakia	1	3	4
5	Kase Kiyoshi	Japan	4	3	7

=== Round 4 ===
Ehrl continued his streak of winning by decision, stretching it to 4 bouts. He also gave Gozzi his first loss and first points, as Gozzi fell into a tie with Koskela at 3 points. Koskela, who had lost to Gozzi in the first round, stayed at 3 points by eliminating Maudr with a win by fall.

Bouts

Winner	Nation	Victory Type	Loser	Nation
Lauri Koskela	Finland	Fall	Jindřich Maudr	Czechoslovakia
Wolfgang Ehrl	Germany	Decision	Giovanni Gozzi	Italy

Points

Rank	Wrestler	Nation	Start	Earned	Total
1	Giovanni Gozzi	Italy	0	3	3
1	Lauri Koskela	Finland	3	0	3
3	Wolfgang Ehrl	Germany	3	1	4
4	Jindřich Maudr	Czechoslovakia	4	3	7

=== Final round ===
Highlighting the oddness of the competition system, Ehrl finished 5–0 and with the silver medal while Gozzi finished 2–1 and with the gold medal—despite losing to Ehrl. Gozzi's two byes and two wins by fall resulted in the loss to Ehrl resulting in the only points he received, so he finished with 3 points. Each of Ehrl's wins, however, was by decision, giving him 5 points and resulting in his elimination. Koskela finished 2–2, with two wins by fall and losses to both Gozzi and Ehrl.

Bouts

Winner	Nation	Victory Type	Loser	Nation
Wolfgang Ehrl	Germany	Fall	Lauri Koskela	Finland
Giovanni Gozzi	Italy	Bye	N/A	N/A

Points

Rank	Wrestler	Nation	Start	Earned	Total
1st place, gold medalist(s)	Giovanni Gozzi	Italy	3	0	3
2nd place, silver medalist(s)	Wolfgang Ehrl	Germany	4	1	5
3rd place, bronze medalist(s)	Lauri Koskela	Finland	3	3	6
