= Corsie =

Corsie is a surname. Notable people with the surname include:

- Rachel Corsie (born 1989), Scottish footballer
- Richard Corsie (born 1966), Scottish bowls player

== See also ==
- Corsi (surname)
