= Gzowski =

Gzowski (Polish pronunciation: [ˈɡzɔfski]; feminine: Gzowska; plural: Gzowscy) is a surname of Polish-language origin. Its Russian-language equivalent is Gzovsky.

The surname may refer to:

- Casimir Gzowski (1813–1898), Polish-Canadian engineer
- Kazimierz Gzowski (1901–1986), Polish cavalry officer
- Peter Gzowski (1934–2002), Polish-Canadian broadcaster
