= Severgnini =

Severgnini is an Italian surname. Notable people with the surname include:

- Beppe Severgnini (born 1956), Italian journalist, essayist and columnist
- Edoardo Severgnini (1904–1969), Italian cyclist
