= Corsi (surname) =

Corsi is a surname. Notable people with the name include:

- Adolfo Corsi (fl. 1928), Italian cyclist
- Angelo Corsi (born 1989), Italian footballer
- Cristiana Corsi (1976–2016), Italian taekwondo practitioner
- Domenico Maria Corsi (1633–1697), Italian Cardinal
- Ermanno Corsi (1939–2025), Italian journalist and writer
- Giuseppe Corsi da Celano (1631/32–after 1691), better known as Celani, Italian composer of the Baroque era
- Jacopo Corsi (1561–1602), Italian composer
- Jamie Corsi (born 1987), Welsh rugby union player
- Jerome Corsi (born 1946), American author, political commentator and conspiracy theorist
- Jim Corsi (disambiguation), multiple people, including:
  - Jim Corsi (baseball) (1961–2022), American baseball pitcher
  - Jim Corsi (ice hockey) (born 1954), Canadian ice hockey goaltender and coach
- Joe Corsi (1894–1959), rugby league footballer of the 1920s for Wales, and Oldham
- Lucio Corsi (born 1993), Italian singer-songwriter
- Marco Corsi, American engineer
- Renato Corsi (born 1963), American-Argentine football (soccer) player
- Simone Corsi (born 1987), motorcycle road racer

== See also ==
- Antonio Pini-Corsi (1859–1918), Italian baritone singer
