= Kazimierz Gzowski =

Kazimierz Gzowski may refer to:

- Casimir Gzowski (1813–1898), engineer and acting Lieutenant Governor of Ontario, 1896–1897
- Kazimierz Gzowski (equestrian) (1901–1986), Polish Olympic horse rider
