= Cycling at the 1928 Summer Olympics – Men's sprint =

Men's sprint at the Games of the IX Olympiad
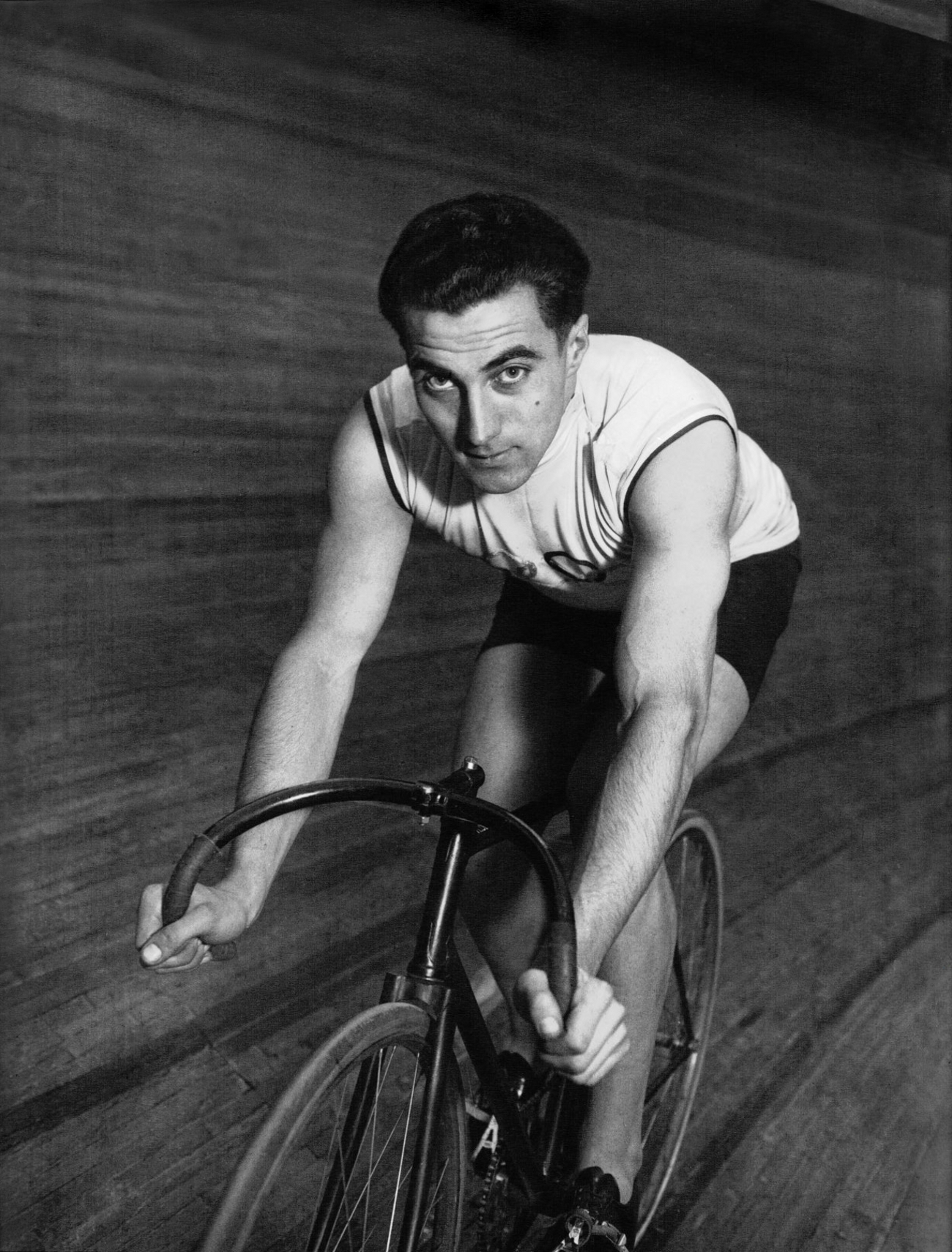
- Roger Beaufrand (1931)
- Venue: Olympic Stadium
- Dates: 4–6 August 1928
- Competitors: 18 from 18 nations

Medalists
1st place, gold medalist(s)		Roger Beaufrand; France
2nd place, silver medalist(s)		Antoine Mazairac; Netherlands
3rd place, bronze medalist(s)		Willy Hansen; Denmark

The men's sprint at the 1928 Summer Olympics took place at the Olympic Stadium in Amsterdam. There were 18 competitors from 18 nations, with each nation (for the first time) limited to one cyclist. The event was won by Roger Beaufrand of France, the nation's second consecutive and fourth overall victory in the men's sprint. Antoine Mazairac of the Netherlands, the only other nation to have won a gold medal in the event, put the Dutch team on the podium for the third consecutive Games with his silver. Willy Hansen earned Denmark's first medal in the event, with his bronze.

== Background ==
This was the sixth appearance of the event, which has been held at every Summer Olympics except 1904 and 1912. None of the semifinalists from 1924 returned. The favorites included Roger Beaufrand of France and the host nation cyclist Antoine Mazairac, who had finished second at the 1923 and 1925 World Championships.

Austria, Ireland, Spain, and Turkey each made their debut in the men's sprint. France made its sixth appearance, the only nation to have competed at every appearance of the event.

== Competition format ==
This track cycling event consisted of numerous rounds. Each race involved the riders starting simultaneously and next to each other, from a standing start. Because the early part of races tend to be slow-paced and highly tactical, only the time for the last 200 metres of the one-kilometre race is recorded.

The competition began with a preliminary round consisting of six races, with the winner of each advancing to the quarterfinals. The losers of the preliminary round competed in a two-round repechage, with two cyclists qualifying for the finals out of the repechage. Beginning with the quarterfinals, the competition was a single elimination tournament, with a bronze medal match.

== Records ==
The records for the sprint are 200 metre flying time trial records, kept for the qualifying round in later Games as well as for the finish of races.

World record	Unknown	Unknown^{*}	Unknown	Unknown
Olympic record	Thomas Johnson (GBR)	11.8	Antwerp, Belgium	9 August 1920

^{*} World records were not tracked by the UCI until 1954.

No new Olympic record was set during the competition.

== Schedule ==
The first round was interrupted by rain and had to be continued on the second day.

Date	Time	Round
Saturday, 4 August 1928	19:00	Round 1 Repechage semifinals Repechage final
Sunday, 5 August 1928	19:30	Quarterfinals
Monday, 6 August 1928	14:00	Semifinals; Medal matches

== Results ==
=== Round 1 ===
==== Heat 1 ====
Rank	Cyclist	Nation	Notes
1	Willy Hansen	Denmark	Q
2	Antonio Malvassi	Argentina	R

==== Heat 2 ====
Rank	Cyclist	Nation	Notes
1	Roger Beaufrand	France	Q
2	Bertie Donnelly	Ireland	R
3	August Schaffer	Austria	R

==== Heat 3 ====
Rank	Cyclist	Nation	Notes
1	Yves Van Massenhove	Belgium	Q
2	Jerzy Koszutski	Poland	R
3	Walter Knabenhans	Switzerland	R

==== Heat 4 ====
Rank	Cyclist	Nation	Notes
1	Hans Bernhardt	Germany	Q
2	James Davies	Canada	R
3	Cavit Cav	Turkey	R

==== Heat 5 ====
Rank	Cyclist	Nation	Notes
1	Antoine Mazairac	Netherlands	Q
2	Sydney Cozens	Great Britain	R
3	Francisco Juillet	Chile	R

==== Heat 6 ====
Rank	Cyclist	Nation	Notes
1	Jack Standen	Australia	Q
2	Edoardo Severgnini	Italy	R
3	Roberts Plūme	Latvia	R
4	José María Yermo	Spain	R

=== Repechage semifinals ===
==== Repechage semifinal 1 ====
Rank	Cyclist	Nation	Notes
1	Walter Knabenhans	Switzerland	Q
2	Francisco Juillet	Chile	

==== Repechage semifinal 2 ====
Rank	Cyclist	Nation	Notes
1	Antonio Malvassi	Argentina	Q
2	Edoardo Severgnini	Italy	
3	James Davies	Canada	

==== Repechage semifinal 3 ====
Rank	Cyclist	Nation	Notes
1	Jerzy Koszutski	Poland	Q
2	Bertie Donnelly	Ireland	
3	Roberts Plūme	Latvia	

==== Repechage semifinal 4 ====
Rank	Cyclist	Nation	Notes
1	Sydney Cozens	Great Britain	Q
2	José María de Yermo	Spain	
3	August Schaffer	Austria	

=== Repechage final ===
Rank	Cyclist	Nation	Notes
1	Jerzy Koszutski	Poland	Q
2	Antonio Malvassi	Argentina	Q
3	Sydney Cozens	Great Britain	
4	Walter Knabenhans	Switzerland	

=== Quarterfinals ===
==== Quarterfinal 1 ====
Rank	Cyclist	Nation	Time 200 m	Notes
1	Hans Bernhardt	Germany	13.2	Q
2	Yves Van Massenhove	Belgium		

==== Quarterfinal 2 ====
Rank	Cyclist	Nation	Time 200 m	Notes
1	Antoine Mazairac	Netherlands	13.2	Q
2	Jack Standen	Australia		

==== Quarterfinal 3 ====
Rank	Cyclist	Nation	Time 200 m	Notes
1	Roger Beaufrand	France	13.4	Q
2	Antonio Malvassi	Argentina		

==== Quarterfinal 4 ====
Rank	Cyclist	Nation	Time 200 m	Notes
1	Willy Hansen	Denmark	13.2	Q
2	Jerzy Koszutski	Poland		

=== Semifinals ===
==== Semifinal 1 ====
Rank	Cyclist	Nation	Time 200 m	Notes
1	Antoine Mazairac	Netherlands	12.2	Q
2	Willy Hansen	Denmark		B

==== Semifinal 2 ====
Rank	Cyclist	Nation	Time 200 m	Notes
1	Roger Beaufrand	France	13.2	Q
2	Hans Bernhardt	Germany		B

=== Medal matches ===
==== Bronze medal match ====
Rank	Cyclist	Nation	Time 200 m
3rd place, bronze medalist(s)	Willy Hansen	Denmark	12.2
4	Hans Bernhardt	Germany	

==== Final ====
Rank	Cyclist	Nation	Time 200 m
1st place, gold medalist(s)	Roger Beaufrand	France	13.2
2nd place, silver medalist(s)	Antoine Mazairac	Netherlands	
