= Corsi =

Corsi may refer to:

- Corsi (people), an ancient people of Corsica and Sardinia
- Corsi (statistic), an advanced statistic in ice hockey
- Corsi (surname), includes a list of people with the name
