= Kiyoshi Kase =

Japanese wrestler

Personal information
- Nationality: Japanese

Sport
- Sport: Wrestling

Kiyoshi Kase (加瀬 清, Kase Kiyoshi) was a Japanese wrestler. He competed in the men's Greco-Roman featherweight at the 1932 Summer Olympics.
