= James Davies (cyclist, born 1906) =

Canadian cyclist

Jim Davies
Personal information
- Born: 8 January 1906 Wandsworth, London, England
- Died: 11 July 1999 (aged 93) Vancouver, British Columbia, Canada

Cycling career
- Sport: Cycling

James Arthur Davies (8 January 1906 – 11 July 1999) was a Canadian cyclist. He competed in the team pursuit and sprint events at the 1928 Summer Olympics.
