= Eduardo Bosc =

Argentine wrestler

Personal information
- Born: 29 October 1899 Monserrat, Argentina

Sport
- Sport: Wrestling

Eduardo Bosc (born 29 October 1899, date of death unknown) was an Argentine wrestler. He competed in the men's Greco-Roman bantamweight at the 1928 Summer Olympics.
