= Antoine Mazairac =

Dutch cyclist (1901–1966)

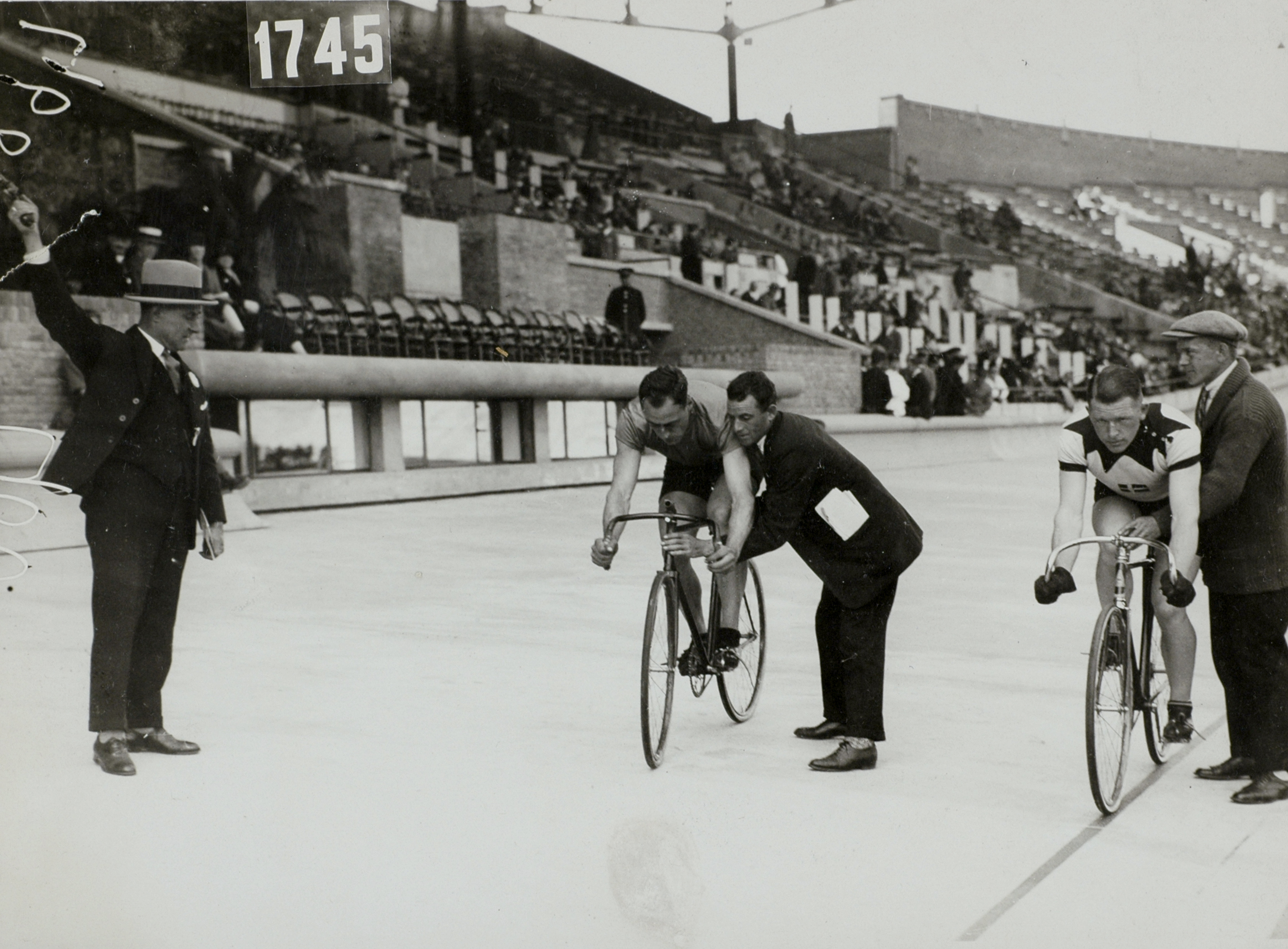
- Antoine Mazairac (left) at the 1928 Olympic Games in Amsterdam in the sprint semi-final against the Danes Willy Falck Hansen.

Personal information
- Born: 24 May 1901 Roosendaal, Netherlands
- Died: 1 September 1966 (aged 65) Dortmund, West Germany

Cycling career
- Sport: Cycling
Medal record
Representing NED
Men's cycling
Olympic Games
| Silver medal – second place | 1928 Amsterdam | Sprint |

Antonius "Antoine" Hendrikus Mazairac (24 May 1901 – 1 September 1966) was a Dutch cyclist who competed in the 1928 Summer Olympics. He won the silver medal in the sprint competition.

== See also ==
- List of Dutch Olympic cyclists
