= Gzovsky =

Gzovsky (feminine: Gzovskaya) is a Russian-language form of the Polish surname Gzowski. In emigration, the surname may also be transliterated as Gsovsky, Gsovski.

The surname may refer to:

- Olga Gzovskaya
- Tatjana Gsovsky
- Victor Gsovsky
