= Bernard Leene =

Dutch cyclist (1903–1988)

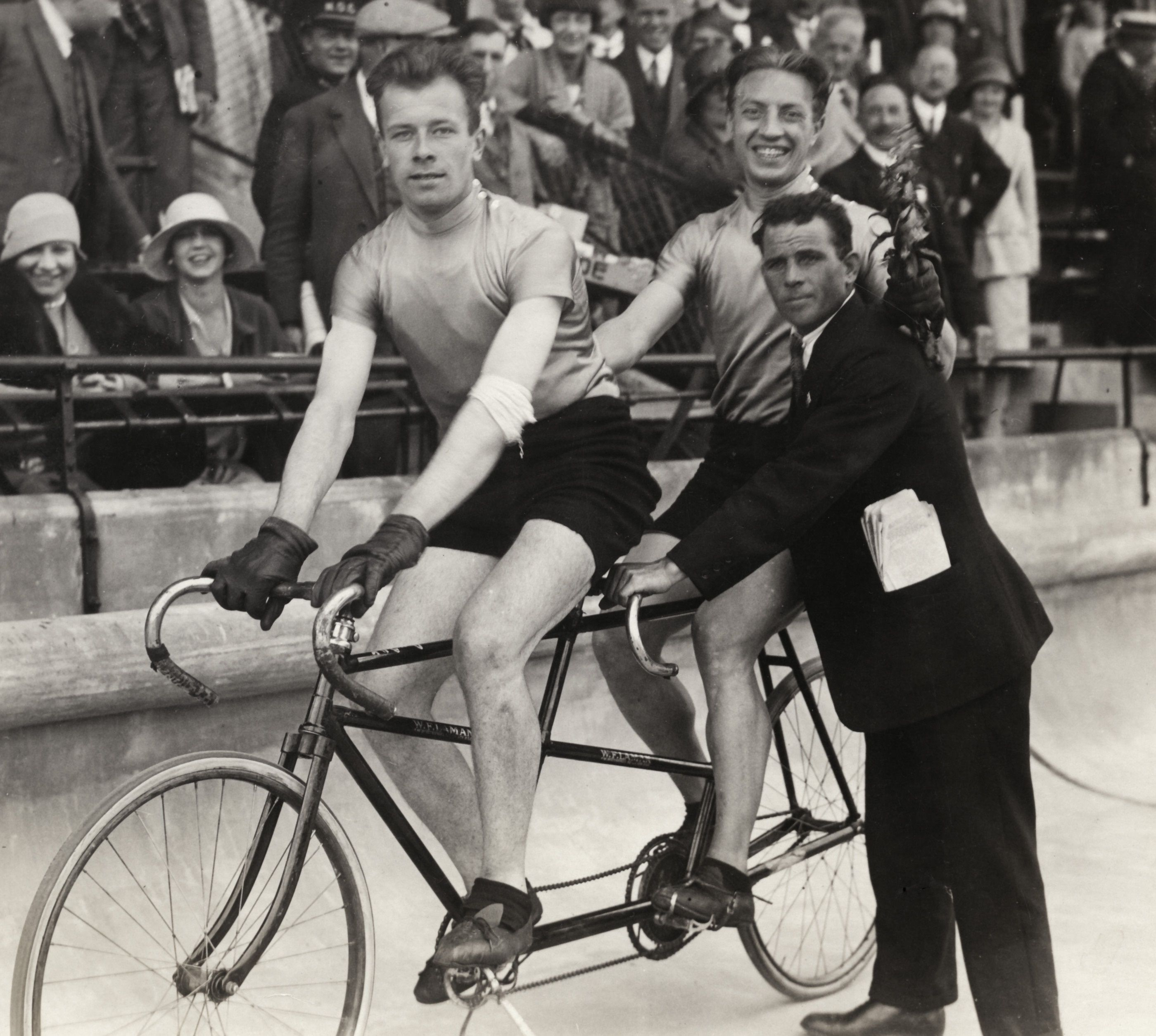
- Daan van Dijk and Bernhard Leene (1928)

Personal information
- Born: 14 February 1903 The Hague, Netherlands
- Died: 24 November 1988 (aged 85) The Hague, Netherlands

Cycling career
- Sport: Cycling
Medal record
Representing NED
Men's cycling
Olympic Games
Gold medal – first place	1928 Amsterdam	Tandem
Silver medal – second place	1936 Berlin	Tandem

Bernardus Petrus Leene (14 February 1903 – 24 November 1988) was a track cyclist from the Netherlands, who represented his native country at three Summer Olympics (1928, 1932, and 1936).

After having won a Gold at the 1928 Summer Olympics in Amsterdam, Netherlands (2.000 m Tandem), he captured the silver medal eight years later in the 2000 m Tandem.

He had one daughter, Antoinette, and two granddaughters, Marita and Monique. All three women were top swimmers and Monique was an Olympian, swimming for New Zealand in the 1976 Olympic games.

During World War II he was a prominent member of the Resistance in The Hague.

== See also ==
- List of Dutch Olympic cyclists
