= Roger Beaufrand =

French cyclist (1908–2007)

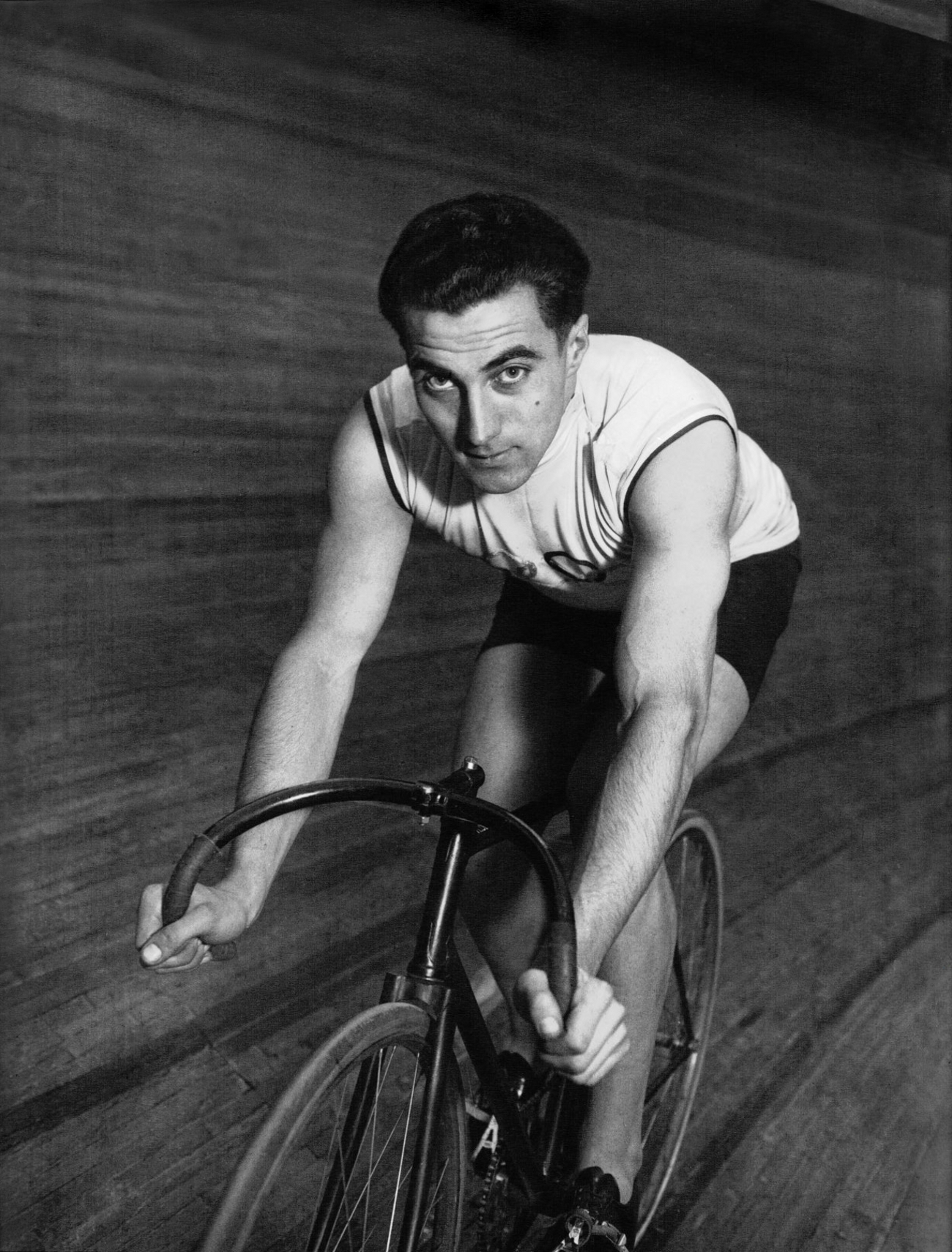
- Roger Beaufrand in 1931

Personal information
- Born: 25 September 1908 La Garenne-Colombes, France
- Died: 14 March 2007 (aged 98) Béziers, France

Cycling career
- Sport: Cycling
Medal record
Representing FRA
Men's cycling
Olympic Games
Gold medal – first place	1928 Amsterdam	Sprint

Roger Beaufrand (25 September 1908 – 14 March 2007) was the world's oldest Olympic gold medal winner, following the death of Pakistani Field Hockey player Feroze Khan in 2005 until his own death.

Born near Paris, France, Beaufrand won a gold medal on 7 August at the 1928 Summer Olympics in the field of Olympic sprint at the age of 19. A few weeks prior to his death, he was presented the Chevalier class of the Legion of Honour by fellow Olympic Champion Jean-Claude Killy.
