= Daan van Dijk =

Dutch cyclist (1907–1986)

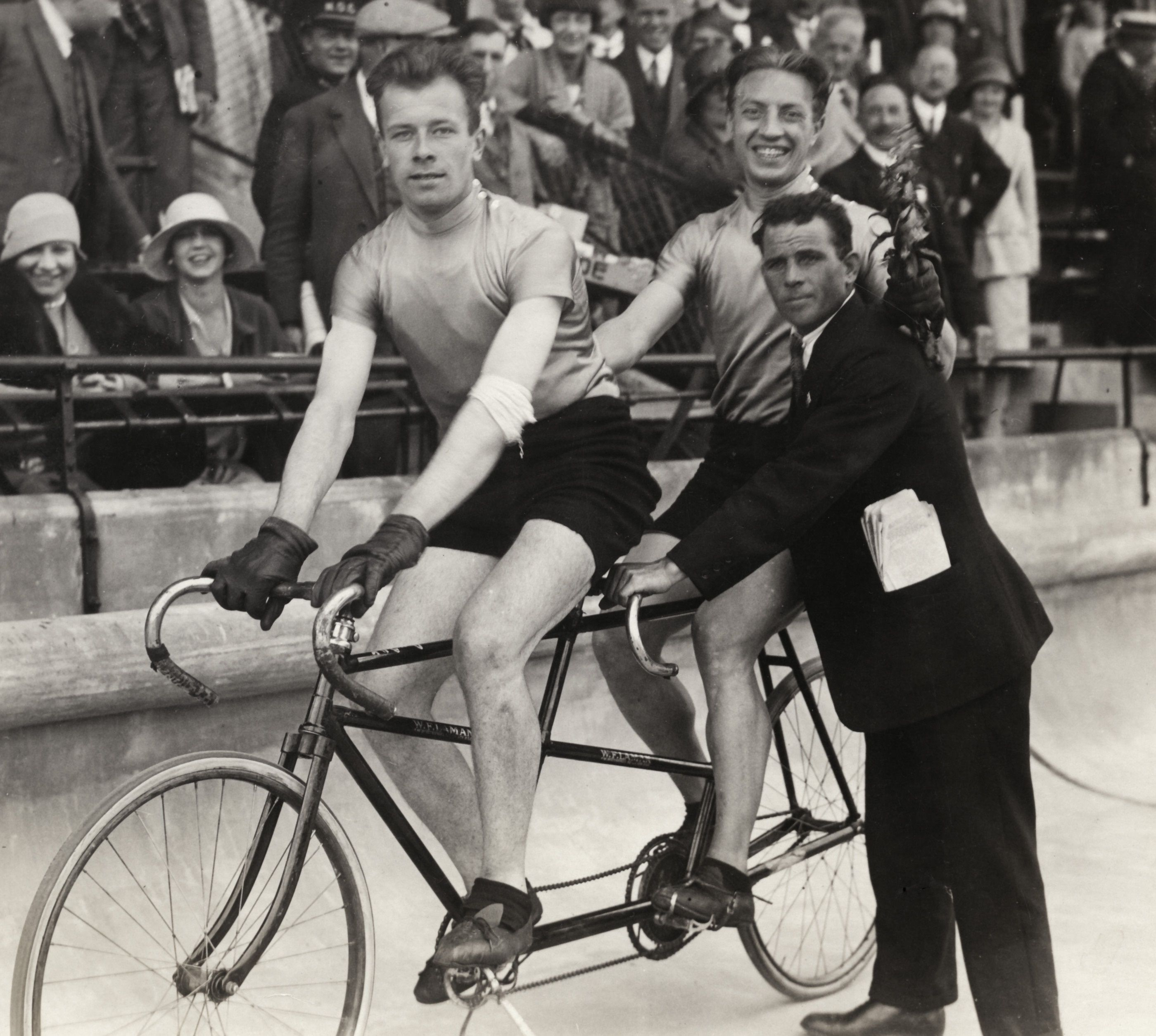
- Daan van Dijk and Bernhard Leene (1928)

Personal information
- Born: 10 May 1907 The Hague, Netherlands
- Died: 22 November 1986 (aged 79) The Hague, Netherlands

Cycling career
- Sport: Cycling
Medal record
Representing NED
Men's cycling
Olympic Games
Gold medal – first place	1928 Amsterdam	Tandem

Daniel "Daan" van Dijk (10 May 1907 – 22 November 1986) was a Dutch track cyclist who competed in the 1928 Summer Olympics. He won the gold medal in the tandem event together with Bernhard Leene.

== See also ==
- List of Dutch Olympic cyclists
