= August Schaffer =

Austrian cyclist

Personal information
- Born: 3 July 1905 Vienna, Austria-Hungary
- Died: 23 May 1986 (aged 80)

Cycling career
- Sport: Cycling

August Schaffer (3 July 1905 – 23 May 1986) was an Austrian cyclist. He competed in the sprint and tandem events at the 1928 Summer Olympics.
