= Thomas Butler Dowda =

American politician

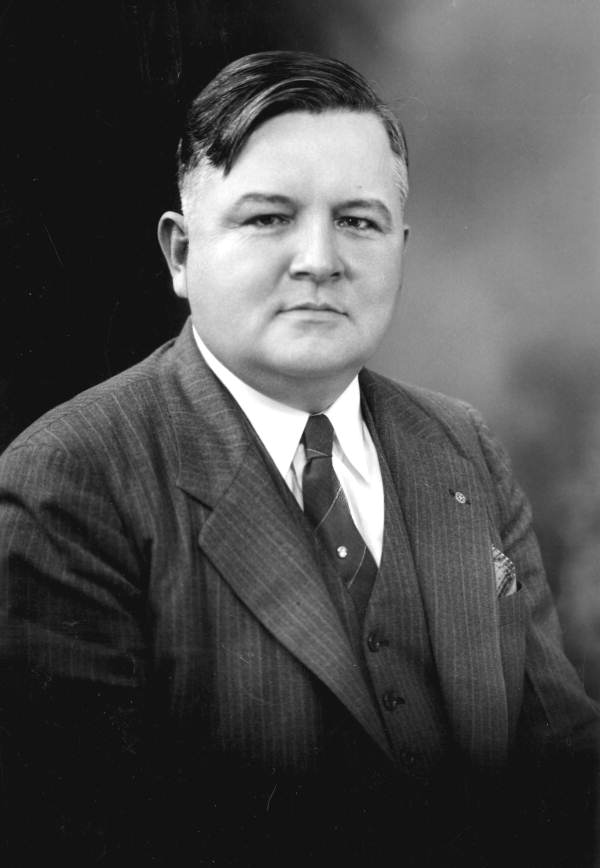
- Dowda in 1941

Member of the Florida House of Representatives from Putnam County
- In office 1941–1953

Personal details
- Born: September 23, 1898 Smyrna, Georgia, U.S.
- Died: September 2, 1986 (aged 87)
- Party: Democratic
- Spouse: Georgia Dowda
- Children: 1
- Education: Stetson University

Thomas Butler Dowda (September 23, 1898 – September 2, 1986) was an American politician. He served as a Democratic member of the Florida House of Representatives.

== Life and career ==
Dowda was born in Smyrna, Georgia. He attended Stetson University.

Dowda served in the Florida House of Representatives from 1941 to 1953.

Dowda died on September 2, 1986, at the age of 87.
