= Marco Corsi =

British electrical engineer

Marco Corsi (born Sunderland, England) is a British electrical engineer who worked for Texas Instruments, Inc.

Marco Corsi was named a Fellow of the Institute of Electrical and Electronics Engineers (IEEE) in 2017 for his work in the development of high-speed amplifiers and analog-to-digital converters. Corsi was elected Texas Instruments Senior Fellow in 2017
