= Edoardo Severgnini =

Italian cyclist

Personal information
- Born: 13 May 1904 Milan, Italy
- Died: 31 January 1969 (aged 64) Milan, Italy

Cycling career
- Sport: Cycling

Edoardo Severgnini (13 May 1904 – 31 January 1969) was an Italian cyclist. He competed in the sprint event at the 1928 Summer Olympics.
