= Alphonse Aria =

French wrestler

- Born: 31 May 1902; Mulhouse, France
- Died: 17 February 1968 (aged 65); Mulhouse, France

Alphonse Aria (31 May 1902 - 17 February 1968) was a French wrestler. He competed in the Greco-Roman bantamweight event at the 1928 Summer Olympics.
