= Feliks Żuber =

Polish sprinter

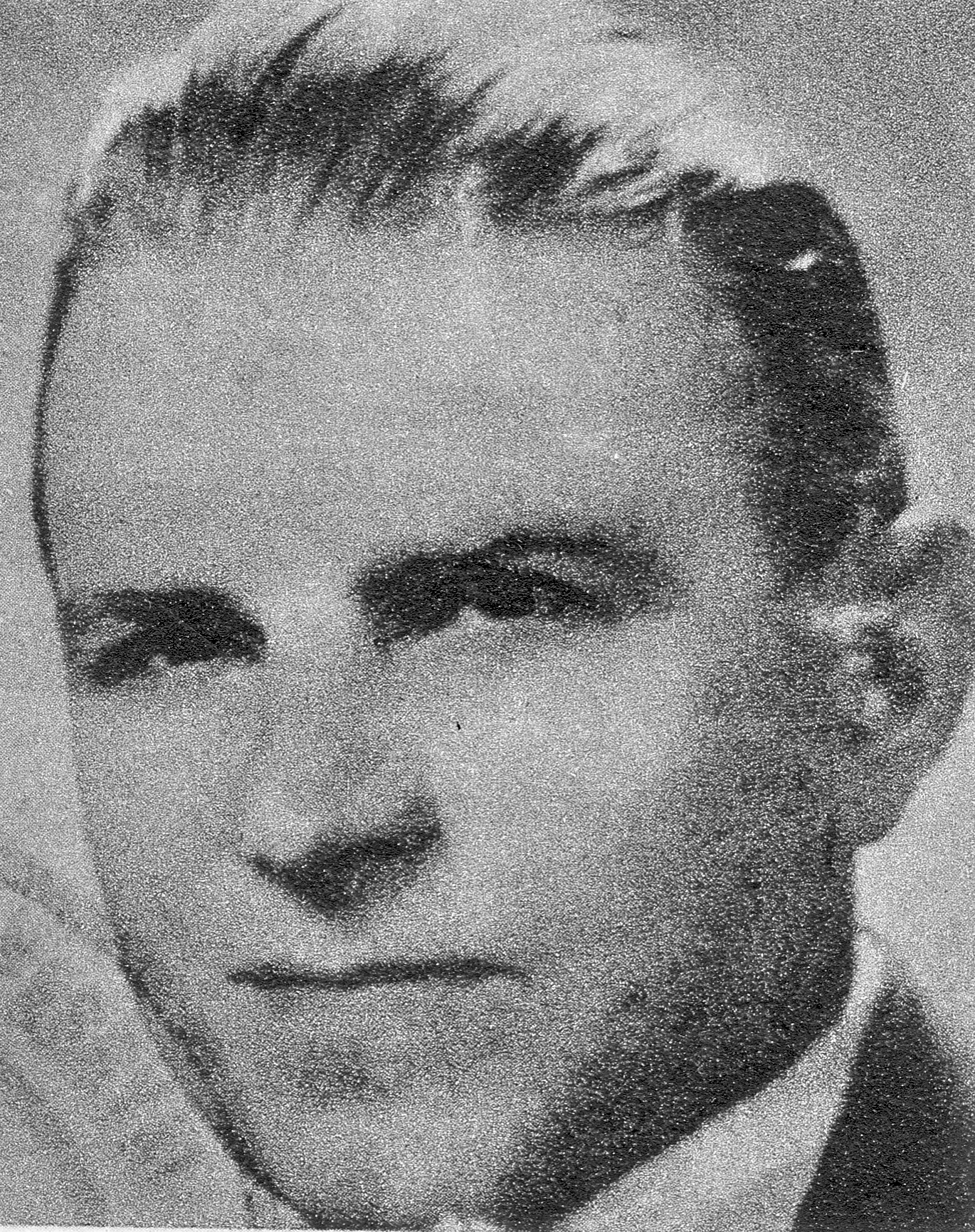

Personal information
- Nationality: Polish
- Born: Feliks Grzegorz Żuber; 10 October 1905 Warsaw, Congress Poland
- Died: 21 June 1940 (aged 34) Palmiry, Warsaw, German-occupied Poland

Sport
- Sport: Sprinting
- Event: 400 metres

Feliks Grzegorz Żuber (10 October 1905 – 21 June 1940) was a Polish sprinter. He competed in the men's 400 metres at the 1928 Summer Olympics. He was executed during World War II in the Palmiry massacre.
