= Ludwik Turowski =

Polish cyclist

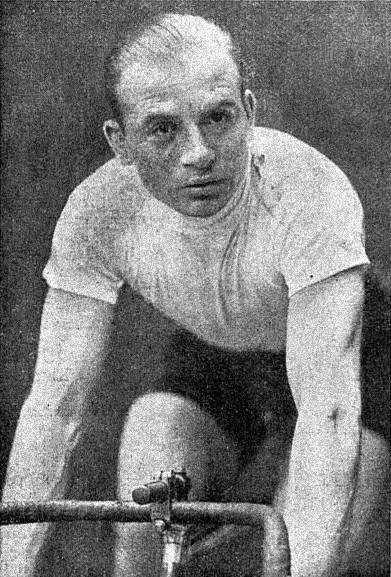

Personal information
- Born: 27 July 1901 Warsaw, Russian Empire
- Died: 14 September 1973 (aged 72) Warsaw, Poland

Cycling career
- Sport: Cycling

Ludwik Turowski (27 July 1901 – 14 September 1973) was a Polish cyclist. He competed in the tandem event at the 1928 Summer Olympics.
