= Francesco Malatesta =

Italian cyclist (1907–1986)

Personal information
- Born: 5 June 1907 Padua, Italy
- Died: 16 September 1986 (aged 79)

Cycling career
- Sport: Cycling

Francesco Malatesta (5 June 1907 – 16 September 1986) was an Italian cyclist. He competed in the tandem event at the 1928 Summer Olympics.
