= Jerzy Koszutski =

Polish cyclist

Personal information
- Born: 30 January 1905 Siedlce, Congress Poland
- Died: 15 June 1960 (aged 55) Nowa Ruda, Poland

Cycling career
- Sport: Cycling

Jerzy Koszutski (30 January 1905 – 15 June 1960) was a Polish cyclist. He competed in the sprint event at the 1928 Summer Olympics.
