= Adolfo Corsi =

Italian cyclist

Personal information
- Full name: Adolfo Corsi

Cycling career
- Sport: Cycling

Adolfo Corsi was an Italian cyclist. He competed in the tandem event at the 1928 Summer Olympics.
