= Bertie Donnelly =

Irish cyclist

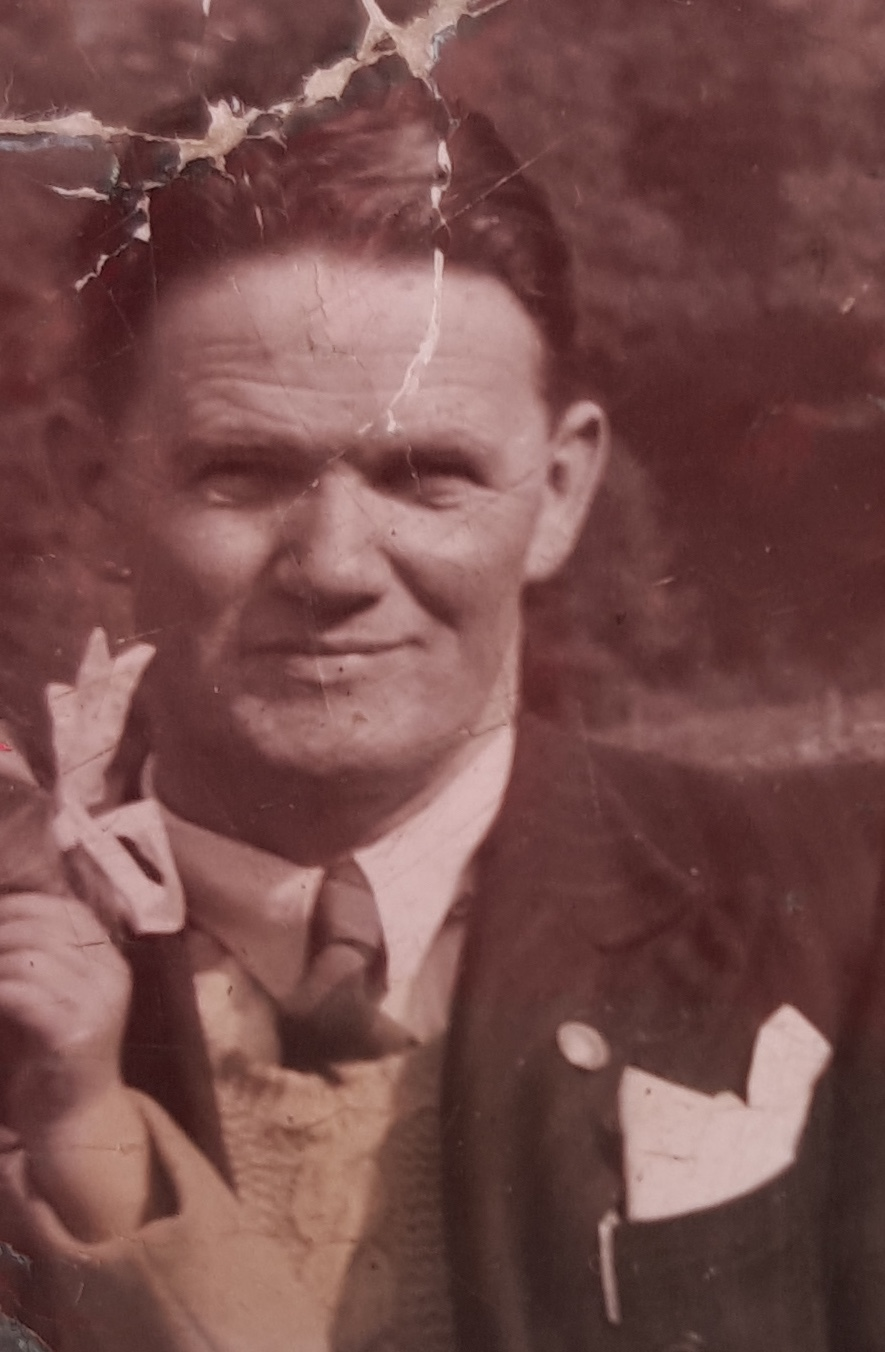

Personal information
- Born: 1894 Dublin, Ireland
- Died: 16 November 1977 (aged 82–83) Dublin, Ireland

Cycling career
- Sport: Cycling

Bertie Donnelly (1894 – 16 November 1977) was an Irish cyclist. He competed in the sprint and the time trial events at the 1928 Summer Olympics. In his life outside cycling, he was a grocer, wine, and spirits merchant.
