= Stanisław Podgórski =

Polish cyclist

Personal information
- Born: 7 May 1905 Warsaw, Russian Empire
- Died: 15 May 1981 (aged 76) Warsaw, Poland

Cycling career
- Sport: Cycling

Stanisław Podgórski (7 May 1905 – 15 May 1981) was a Polish cyclist. He competed in the tandem event at the 1928 Summer Olympics.
