= Eugeniusz Michalak =

Polish cyclist (1908–1988)

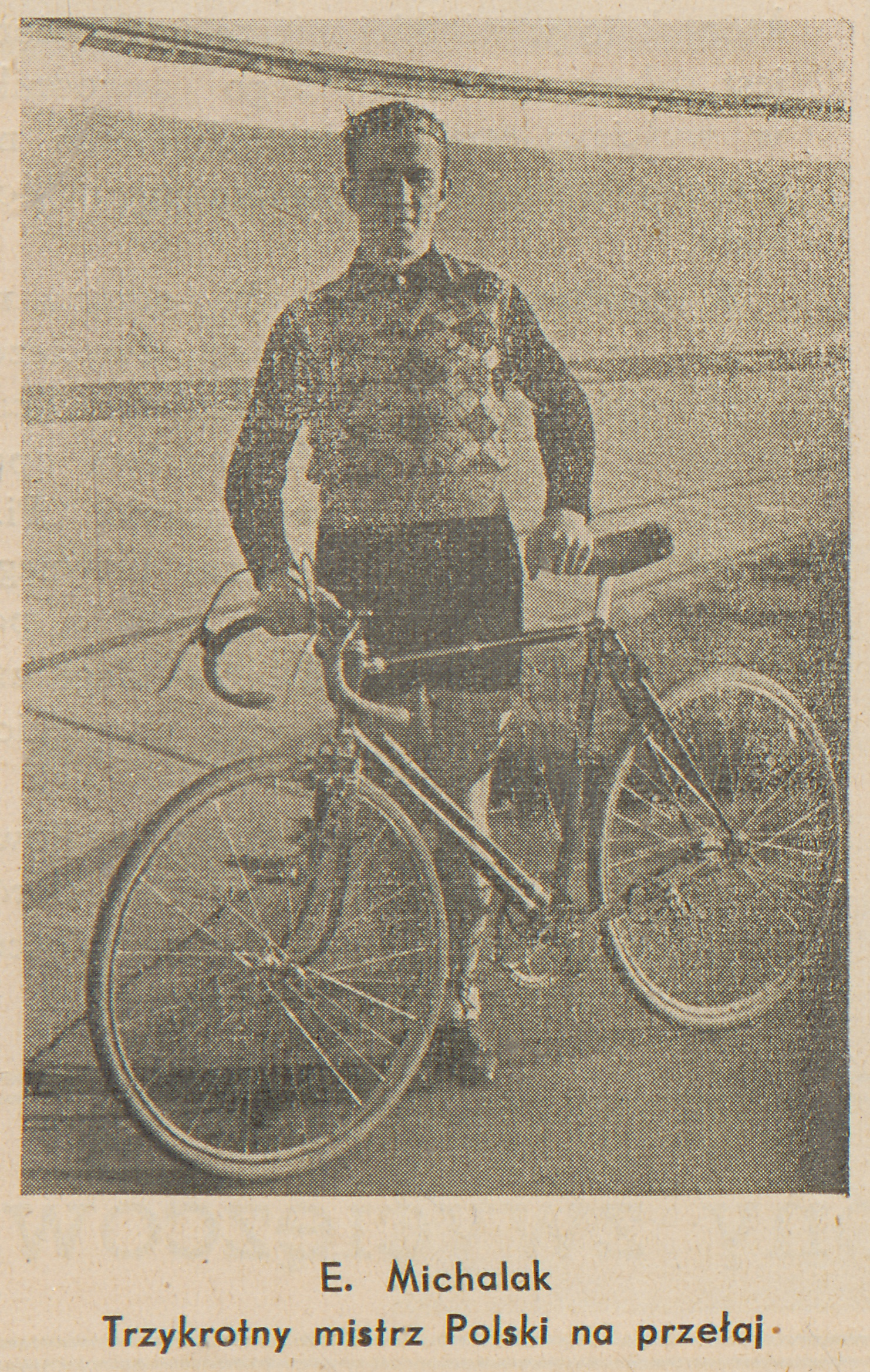

Personal information
- Born: 28 October 1908 Warsaw, Russian Empire
- Died: 22 July 1988 (aged 79) Warsaw, Poland

Cycling career
- Sport: Cycling

Eugeniusz Michalak (28 October 1908 – 22 July 1988) was a Polish cyclist. He competed in the individual and team road race events at the 1928 Summer Olympics.
