= Józef Popowski =

Polish cyclist

Personal information
- Full name: Julian Józef Popowski
- Born: 14 February 1904 Warsaw, Russian Empire
- Died: 9 July 1961 (aged 57) Wrocław, Poland

Cycling career
- Sport: Cycling

Julian Józef Popowski (14 February 1904 – 9 July 1961) was a Polish cyclist. He competed in the individual and team road race events at the 1928 Summer Olympics.
