= Bert Hodges (cricketer) =

Welsh cricketer

Personal information
- Full name: Albert Edward Hodges
- Born: 29 January 1905; Newport, Monmouthshire, Wales
- Died: 23 September 1986 (aged 81); Maindee, Monmouthshire, Wales
- Batting: Right-handed

Domestic team information
- Years: Team
- 1936: Glamorgan
- 1930: Wales
- 1926–1934: Monmouthshire

Career statistics
Competition	FC
Matches	2
Runs scored	14
Batting average	3.50
100s/50s	–/–
Top score	8
Balls bowled	36
Wickets	–
Bowling average	–
5 wickets in innings	–
10 wickets in match	–
Best bowling	–
Catches/stumpings	–/–
- Source: Cricinfo, 4 July 2010

Albert Edward Hodges (29 January 1905 – 23 September 1986) was a Welsh cricketer. Hodges was a right-handed batsman who bowled right-arm leg break googly. He was born at Briton Ferry, Glamorgan.

Hodges debut in County Cricket came for Monmouthshire in the 1926 Minor Counties Championship against Cornwall. From 1926 to 1934, he played 27 Minor Counties matches for Monmouthshire, with his final appearance for the county coming against Berkshire in 1934.

Hodges made his first-class debut in 1930, when he represented Wales against the Marylebone Cricket Club at Lord's. Six years later Hodges made his first-class debut for Glamorgan against Gloucestershire, in what was his only first-class appearance for the county.

Hodges died at Maindee, Monmouthshire on 23 September 1986.
