= Walter Knabenhans =

Swiss cyclist

Personal information
- Born: 15 February 1906 Zurich, Switzerland
- Died: April 1990 (aged 84)

Cycling career
- Sport: Cycling

Walter "Willi" Knabenhans (15 February 1906 – April 1990) was a Swiss cyclist. He competed in the sprint event at the 1928 Summer Olympics.
