= Burhan Conkeroğlu =

Turkish wrestler

- Born: 1903
- Died: January 2001 (aged 97); İzmir, Turkey

Burhan Conkeroğlu (1903 – January 2001) was a Turkish wrestler who competed at the 1928 Summer Olympics.
