= Georges Miller =

Luxembourgish wrestler (1906–1979)

- Born: 13 December 1906
- Died: 5 February 1979 (aged 72)

Georges Miller (13 December 1906 – 5 February 1979) was a wrestler from Luxembourg. He competed at the 1928 Summer Olympics.
