= Frank Stewart (Australian footballer) =

Australian rules footballer, born 1910

Personal information
- Full name: Frank William Cape Stewart
- Born: 11 August 1910; Melbourne West, Victoria
- Died: 4 September 1986 (aged 76); Heidelberg West, Victoria
- Original team: Mentone
- Height: 166 cm (5 ft 5 in)
- Weight: 74 kg (163 lb)

Playing career^{1}
Years	Club	Games (Goals)
1931	Hawthorn	4 (0)
- ^{1} Playing statistics correct to the end of 1931.

Frank William Cape Stewart (11 August 1910 – 4 September 1986) was an Australian rules footballer who played with Hawthorn in the Victorian Football League (VFL).
