= Sid Elliott =

Australian rugby league footballer

Personal information
- Full name: Sydney George Elliott
- Born: 17 February 1915; Petersham, New South Wales, Australia
- Died: 4 September 1986 (aged 71)

Playing information
- Position: Centre, Fullback
Club
Years	Team	Pld	T	G	FG	P
1933	Western Suburbs	1	0	0	0	0
1935–40	Canterbury-Bankstown	15	1	0	0	3
	Total	16	1	0	0	3
- Source: As of 31 March 2025

Sydney George Elliott (17 February 1915 – 4 September 1986) was an Australian professional rugby league footballer who played in the 1930s and 1940s. Elliott played for Western Suburbs and Canterbury-Bankstown. Elliott was a foundation player for Canterbury-Bankstown.

== Playing career ==
Elliott made his first grade debut in Round 9 1933 against Balmain at Drummoyne Oval. In 1934, Elliott was selected to play for NSW Country and featured in 2 games scoring 2 tries. In 1935, Elliott signed for newly admitted side Canterbury-Bankstown.

Elliott played for the club in their first ever game against North Sydney at North Sydney Oval which finished in a 20-5 loss.

Canterbury-Bankstown finished the 1935 season in second last position narrowly avoiding the wooden spoon which was handed to University. Elliott played sporadically for Canterbury over the next 5 seasons mainly featuring in reserve grade and he retired at the end of 1940.
