= Les Field =

Australian rules footballer

Personal information
- Full name: Leslie Gordon Field
- Born: 29 November 1921; Casterton, Victoria
- Died: 29 September 1986 (aged 64); Dandenong South, Victoria
- Original team: Casterton
- Height: 173 cm (5 ft 8 in)
- Weight: 67 kg (148 lb)
- Position: Wingman

Playing career^{1}
Years	Club	Games (Goals)
1947	Essendon	2 (0)
- ^{1} Playing statistics correct to the end of 1947.

Leslie Gordon Field (29 November 1921 – 29 September 1986) was an Australian rules footballer who played two games with Essendon in the Victorian Football League (VFL).

Raised in Casterton, Les Field enlisted to serve in World War II in July 1942, and was reported as being in a motor regiment in December 1942 after completion of special wireless training in Sydney. He was discharged after the end of the war, in early 1946.

In March 1946 Les Field was named as an Essendon recruit but ended up playing for Casterton that year. He played well for a Casterton District team against Essendon in October 1946.

He commenced playing with Essendon in 1947, performing well in the reserves before making his senior debut against Fitzroy on 31 May 1947. He was dropped after two games and in 1948 was reported as seeking a clearance to Hawthorn but this move did not eventuate and his elite level career ended after only two games.

Les Field died in September 1986.
