= Anna Koutsoyiannis =

- Born: 1932
- Died: 1986 (aged 53–54)
- Citizenship: Great Britain
- Known for: Economics of Tobacco
- Scientific career
- Fields: Economics

Anna Koutsoyiannis (Greek: Άννα Κουτσογιάννη; 1932–1986) was a Greek-born British microeconomist.

She was awarded a PhD by and took her first teaching job at the University of Manchester in the early 1960s. She returned to Greece and worked at the Graduate School of Business Studies in Athens and at the University of Thessaloniki. She then returned to the UK to work at the University of Lancaster (1968–1974). She then emigrated to Canada working first as Professor at the University of Waterloo and then at the University of Ottawa.

In 1978, the University of Waterloo gave her its 'Distinguished Teacher Award'. During 1968-1973 Dr. Koutsoyiannis was senior lecturer and subsequently (1974–1975) reader in economics at the University of Lancaster. From 1962 to 1968 the author taught in Greece at the University of Thessaloniki, and the Graduate School of Business Studies, Athens, and was Senior Project Director at the Centre of Planning and Economic Research, Athens. Koutsoyiannis died September 10, 1986.

Further information on Koutsoyiannis is available in her entry in Mark Blaug's Who's Who in Economics.

== Key books ==
- The Leaf Tobacco Market of Greece. 1963.
- Demand Functions for Tobacco. 1963.

=== Noted textbooks ===
- Theory of Econometrics. Macmillan, 1973.
- Modern Microeconomics. Macmillan, 1975.
- Non-Price Decisions. Macmillan, 1982.

== Sources ==
Dimand, R. W., Dimand, M. A., & Forget, E. L. (2000). A biographical dictionary of women economists. Cheltenham, UK: Edward Elgar.
