= Dick May (footballer) =

Australian rules footballer (1910–1986)

Personal information
- Full name: Richard Edward George May
- Born: 16 May 1910; Newlyn, Victoria
- Died: 13 September 1986 (aged 76); Sale, Victoria
- Original team: Stratford

Playing career^{1}
Years	Club	Games (Goals)
1933–34	North Melbourne	9 (4)
- ^{1} Playing statistics correct to the end of 1934.

Richard Edward George May (16 May 1910 – 13 September 1986) was an Australian rules footballer who played with North Melbourne in the Victorian Football League (VFL).

May enlisted in the Australian Army shortly after the commencement of World War II and served until the end of the war, with his battalion serving in both the Middle East and northern Australia during his service.
