= Antonio Malvassi =

Argentine cyclist

Personal information
- Born: 1904 Cirò, Italy

Cycling career
- Sport: Cycling

Antonio Malvassi (born 1904 in Cirò, date of death unknown) was an Argentine cyclist. He competed in the sprint event at the 1928 Summer Olympics.
