= Henryk Ganzera =

Polish wrestler

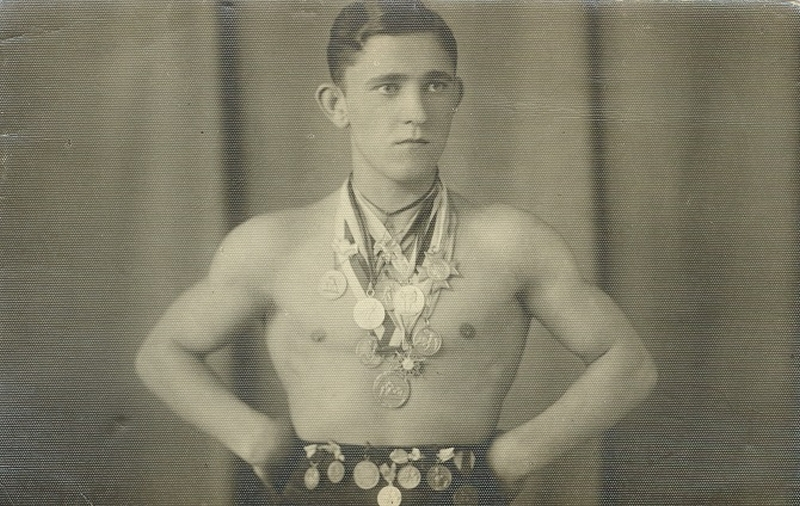

Personal information
- Nationality: Polish
- Born: 11 March 1903 Rybnick, German Empire
- Died: 1942 (aged 38–39)

Sport
- Sport: Wrestling

Henryk Ganzera (11 March 1903 – 1942) was a Polish wrestler. He competed in the men's Greco-Roman bantamweight at the 1928 Summer Olympics.
