= Wyatt Turner =

American baseball player

- Catcher
- Born: January 5, 1909; Pittsburgh, Pennsylvania, U.S.
- Died: September 19, 1986 (aged 77); Pittsburgh, Pennsylvania, U.S.
- Batted: Right Threw: Right

Negro league baseball debut
- 1939, for the Homestead Grays

Last appearance
- 1939, for the Homestead Grays

Teams
- Homestead Grays (1939)

Wyatt James Turner (January 5, 1909 – September 19, 1986) was an American Negro league catcher in the 1930s.

A native of Pittsburgh, Pennsylvania, Turner played for the Homestead Grays in 1939 and served in the US Navy during World War II. He died in Pittsburgh in 1986 at age 77.
