= Jim Corsi =

Jim Corsi may refer to:

- Jim Corsi (baseball) (1961–2022), American baseball pitcher
- Jim Corsi (ice hockey) (born 1954), Canadian soccer player, ice hockey goaltender, coach, and statistician
