= Wilfrid Timms =

English cricketer and schoolteacher

Personal information
- Full name: Wilfrid Walter Timms
- Born: 28 September 1902; Northampton, Northamptonshire, England
- Died: 30 September 1986 (aged 84); Godalming, Surrey, England
- Batting: Right-handed

Domestic team information
- Years: Team
- 1921–1932: Northamptonshire
- 1922–1925: Cambridge University

Career statistics
Competition	FC
Matches	106
Runs scored	4083
Batting average	22.55
100s/50s	4/22
Top score	154*
Balls bowled	179
Wickets	0
Bowling average	–
5 wickets in innings	–
10 wickets in match	–
Best bowling	–
Catches/stumpings	25/0
- Source: Cricinfo, 27 August 2019

Wilfrid Walter Timms (28 September 1902 – 30 September 1986) was an English cricketer and schoolteacher who played first-class cricket for Northamptonshire and Cambridge University from 1921 to 1932.

Timms made his first-class debut while still a schoolboy at Northampton School for Boys. In his second match, when Northamptonshire followed on 381 in arrears, he scored 154 not out in five and three-quarter hours to save the match.

From 1930 he taught as a schoolmaster at Charterhouse School in Godalming, running the cricket at the school from 1932 to 1946.
