= Yves Van Massenhove =

Belgian cyclist

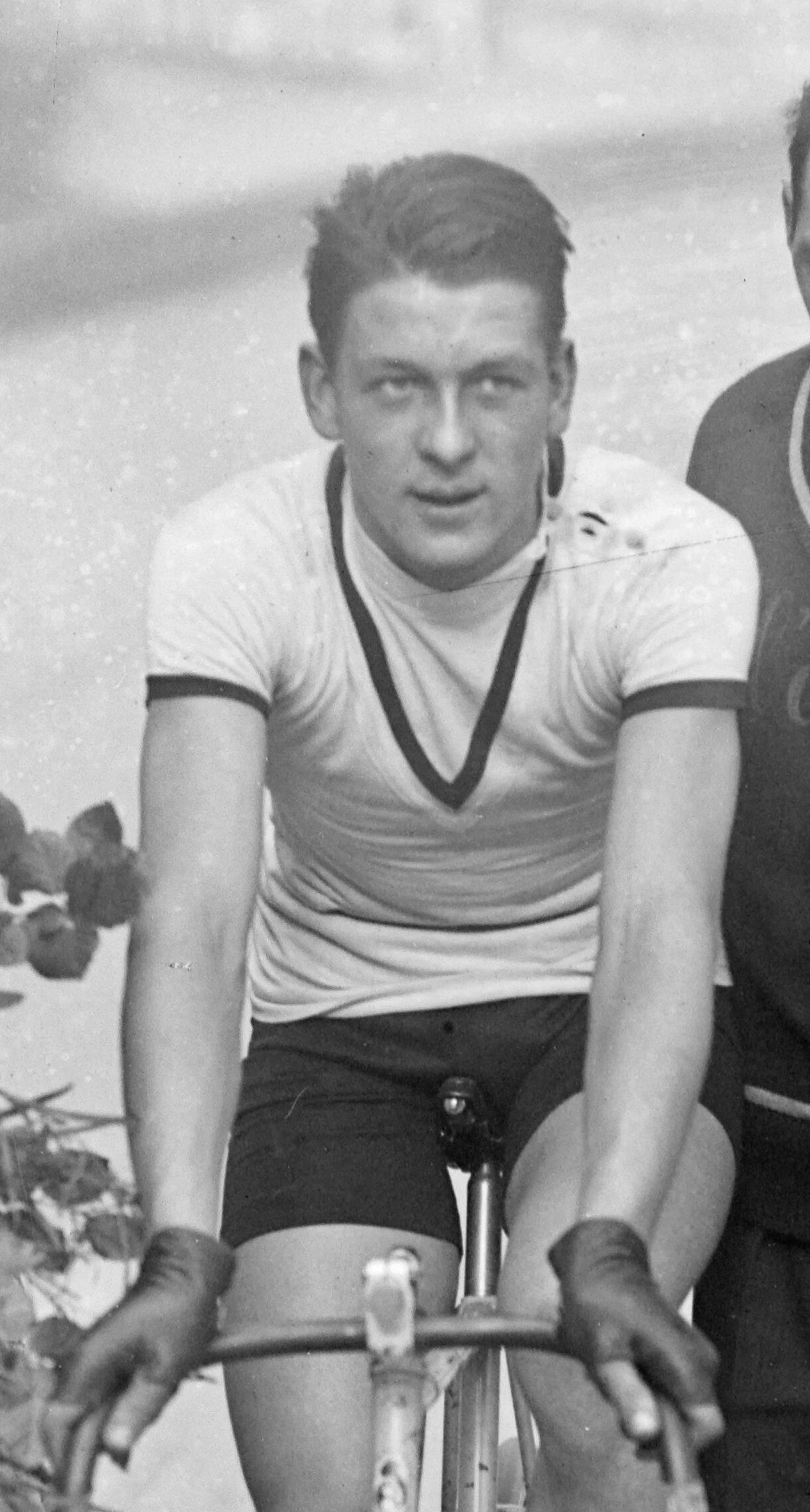

Personal information
- Born: 26 February 1909 Saint-Josse-ten-Noode, Belgium
- Died: 15 May 1990 (aged 81) Châtenay-Malabry, France

Cycling career
- Sport: Cycling

Yves Van Massenhove (26 February 1909 – 15 May 1990) was a Belgian cyclist. He competed in the team pursuit and sprint events at the 1928 Summer Olympics.
