= Kazimierz Szosland =

Polish equestrian

Olympic medal record

Representing Poland

Men's Equestrian
Silver medal – second place	1928 Amsterdam	Team jumping

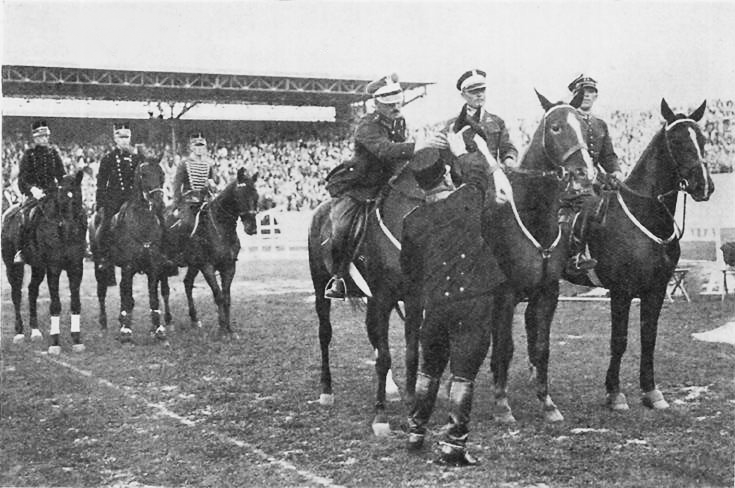
1928 Amsterdam. In the foreground the Polish team (from the left): Kazimierz Szosland, Michał Antoniewicz, Kazimierz Gzowski.

Kazimierz Szosland (21 February 1891, Grzymaczew, Kalisz Governorate – 20 April 1944) was a Polish horse rider, major of the Polish Army, who competed in the 1924 Summer Olympics and in the 1928 Summer Olympics.

He fought in the wars with Ukraine and Soviet Russia and was killed in action during World War II.

In 1924 he finished 23rd in the individual three-day event and placed seventh in the team three-day event. In the individual jumping competition he finished 32nd. The Polish team finished in sixth position. Four years later he won the silver medal with the Polish team in the team jumping with his horse Ali after finishing thirteenth in the individual jumping.
