= Cycling at the 1928 Summer Olympics – Men's tandem =

Men's tandem at the Games of the IX Olympiad
- Venue: Olympic Stadium
- Competitors: 14 from 7 nations

Medalists
1st place, gold medalist(s)		Netherlands; Bernhard Leene, Daan van Dijk
2nd place, silver medalist(s)		Great Britain; Ernest Chambers, John Sibbit
3rd place, bronze medalist(s)		Germany; Hans Bernhardt, Karl Köther

The men's tandem at the 1928 Summer Olympics took place at the Olympic Stadium in Amsterdam.

This track cycling event consisted of multiple rounds. The event was a single elimination tournament, with a third-place race between the semifinal losers.

The Dutch entrants for this race were Bernhard Leene and Daan van Dijk. They beat the Austrian team in the first round, and competed against the German team in the semi-final. After two rounds, the Dutch team fell, and the race was restarted. This second time, the Dutch team won with a small margin.

In the final, the Dutch team faced the British team, John Sibbit and Ernest Chambers. The British team led the race until the final corner, when the Dutch team overtook them.

== Match round ==
=== Round 1 ===
Match 1

Rank	Nation	Cyclists	Time (last 200m)
1 Q	Netherlands	Bernhard Leene; Daan van Dijk	12.0 seconds
2	Austria	August Schaffer; Franz Dusika	

Match 2

Rank	Nation	Cyclists	Time (last 200m)
1 Q	Great Britain	Ernest Chambers; John Sibbit	13.2 seconds
2	France	Henri Lemoine; Hubert Guyard	

Match 3

Rank	Nation	Cyclists	Time (last 200m)
1 Q	Germany	Hans Bernhardt; Karl Köther	12.4 seconds
2	Poland	Ludwik Turowski; Stanisław Podgórski	

Match 4

Rank	Nation	Cyclists	Time (last 200m)
1 Q	Italy	Adolfo Corsi; Francesco Malatesta	N/A
–	Bye		

=== Semifinals ===
Semifinal 1

Rank	Nation	Cyclists	Time (last 200m)
1 Q	Great Britain	Ernest Chambers; John Sibbit	12.2 seconds
2	Italy	Adolfo Corsi; Francesco Malatesta	

Semifinal 2

Rank	Nation	Cyclists	Time (last 200m)
1 Q	Netherlands	Bernhard Leene; Daan van Dijk	12.2 seconds
2	Germany	Hans Bernhardt; Karl Köther	

=== Medal matches ===
Gold medal match

Rank	Nation	Cyclists	Time (last 200m)
Gold medal	Netherlands	Bernhard Leene; Daan van Dijk	11.8 seconds
Silver medal	Great Britain	Ernest Chambers; John Sibbit	

Bronze medal match

Rank	Nation	Cyclists	Time (last 200m)
1	Germany	Hans Bernhardt; Karl Köther	12.2 seconds
2 (4th)	Italy	Adolfo Corsi; Francesco Malatesta	
