= Jindřich Maudr =

Czechoslovak wrestler

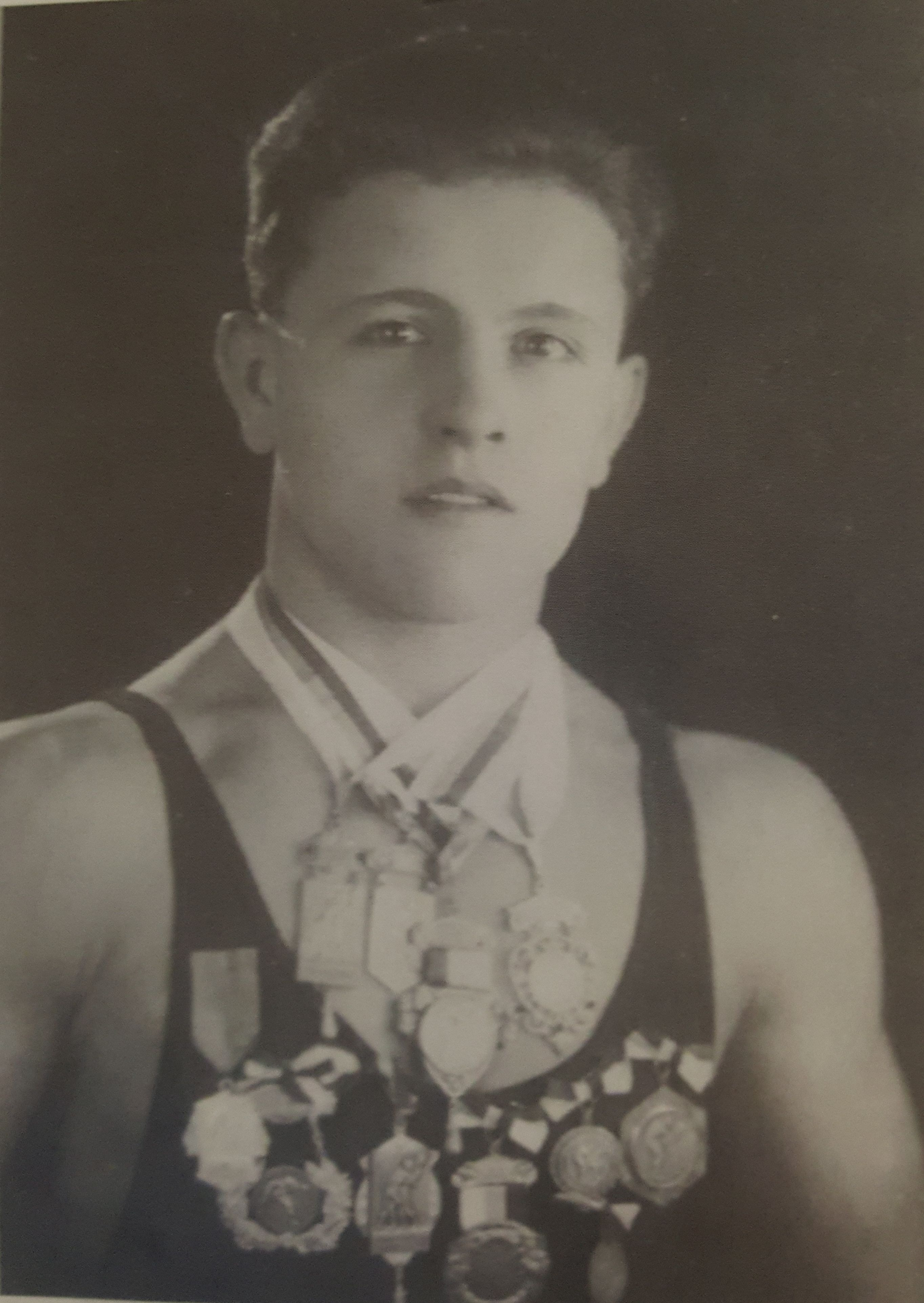
- Maudr with his medals

Personal information
- Born: 10 January 1906 Prague, Austria-Hungary
- Died: 1 May 1990 (aged 84) Prague, Czechoslovakia

Sport
- Sport: Wrestling
Medal record
Men's Greco-Roman wrestling
Representing Czechoslovakia
Olympic Games
Silver medal – second place	1928 Amsterdam	Bantamweight

Jindřich Maudr (10 January 1906 – 1 May 1990) was a Czech wrestler. He won an Olympic silver medal in Greco-Roman wrestling in 1928. He also competed at the 1932 Summer Olympics.
