= Kurt Leucht =

German wrestler (1903 –1974)

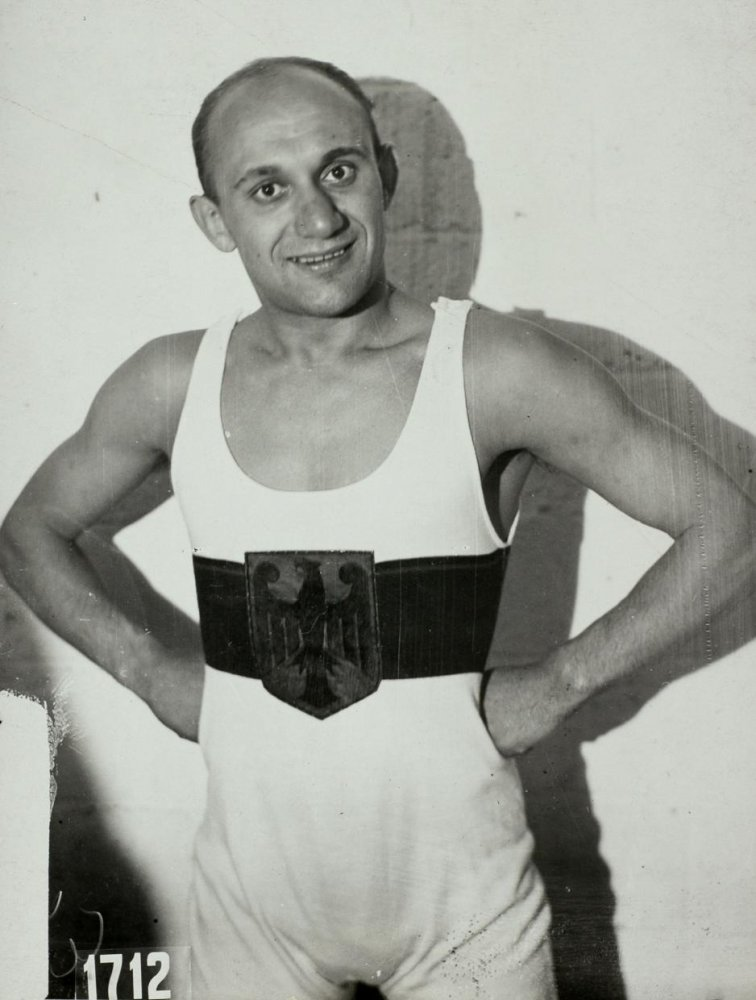
- Kurt Leucht at the 1928 Olympics

Personal information
- Born: 31 March 1903 Nuremberg, German Empire
- Died: 2 November 1974 (aged 71) Nuremberg, West Germany

Sport
- Sport: Greco-Roman wrestling
Medal record
Men's Greco-Roman wrestling
Representing Weimar Germany
Olympic Games
Gold medal – first place	1928 Amsterdam	Bantamweight
European Championships
Silver medal – second place	1931 Prague	56 kg

Kurt Leucht (31 March 1903 – 2 November 1974) was a Greco-Roman wrestler from Nuremberg who won an Olympic title in 1928 and a silver medal at the 1931 European Championships.
