= Ðula Sabo =

Yugoslav wrestler

- Born: Дула Сабо

Ðula Sabo was a Yugoslavian wrestler who competed at the 1928 Summer Olympics. Sabo is deceased.
