= Hans Bernhardt =

German cyclist (1906–1940)

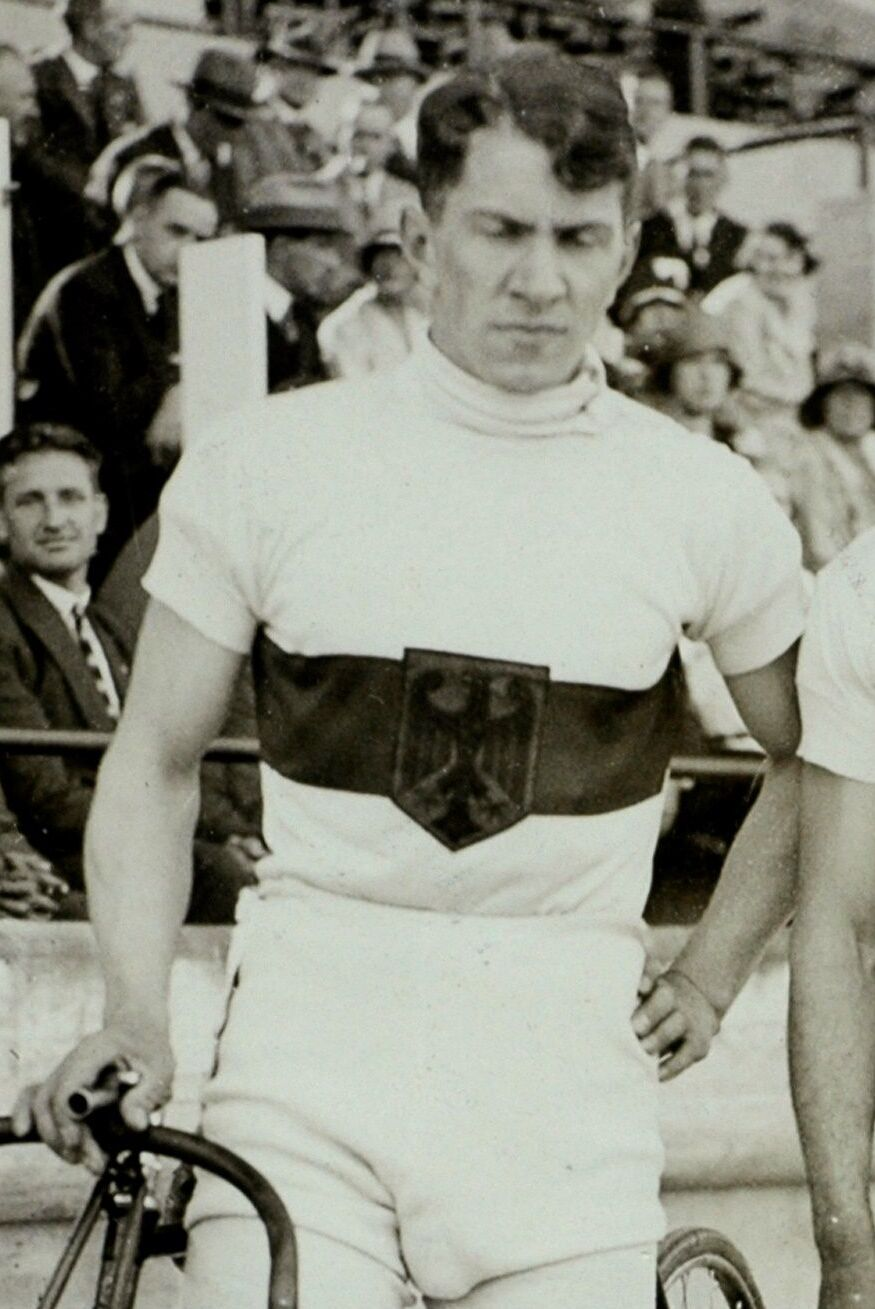
- Hans Bernhardt in 1928

Personal information
- Born: 28 January 1906 Leipzig, Germany
- Died: 29 November 1940 (aged 34) Amsterdam, Netherlands

Cycling career
- Sport: Cycling
Medal record
Representing GER
Men's cycling
Olympic Games
Bronze medal – third place	1928 Amsterdam	Tandem

Hans Bernhardt (28 January 1906 – 29 November 1940) was a German cyclist. He won the bronze medal in the Men's tandem event at the 1928 Summer Olympics.

Bernhardt, member of the Wehrmacht, was killed during World War II in the Netherlands.
