= Oscar Lindelöf =

Swedish wrestler

- Born: 15 September 1903; Landskrona, Sweden
- Died: 4 January 1993 (aged 89); Malmö, Sweden

Oscar Sigurd Lindelöf (15 September 1903 – 4 January 1993) was a Swedish wrestler who competed in the Greco-Roman wrestling bantamweight class at the 1928 Summer Olympics and the Greco-Roman featherweight class at the 1932 Summer Olympics.
