= Kazimierz Gzowski (equestrian) =

Polish equestrian (1901–1986)

Kazimierz Aleksander Gzowski
- Born: October 8, 1901; Sumy, Kharkov Governorate, Russian Empire
- Died: June 25, 1986 (aged 84); London, Great Britain
- Occupations: Cavalry officer and horse rider
- Known for: Silver medal in horse riding in the 1928 Summer Olympics with the Polish team

Kazimierz Aleksander Gzowski (October 8, 1901 in Sumy, Kharkov Governorate, Russian Empire – June 25, 1986 in London, Great Britain) was a Polish cavalry officer and horse rider who competed in the 1928 Summer Olympics.

He won the silver medal with the Polish team in the team jumping with his horse Mylord after finishing fourth in the individual jumping.

Olympic medal record

Men's Equestrian
Silver medal – second place	1928 Amsterdam	Team jumping

During the World War I Gzowski served in the Imperial Russian Army and since 1919 in the Polish. On 30 April 1935 he retired from military. Gzowski fought in World War II with the Polish forces in the West. After the war, he stayed in England.

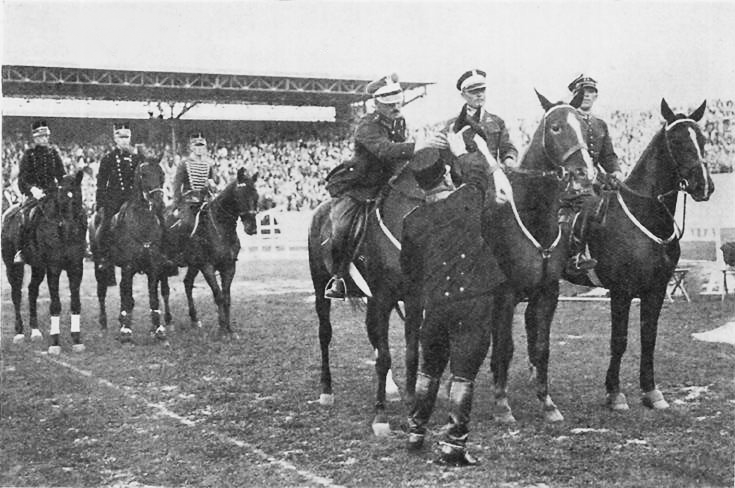
1928 Amsterdam. In the foreground the Polish team (from the left): Kazimierz Szosland, Michał Antoniewicz, Kazimierz Gzowski
