= Austria at the 1928 Summer Olympics =

- IOC code: AUT
- NOC: Austrian Olympic Committee

in Amsterdam
- Competitors: 73 (67 men, 6 women) in 13 sports
- Flag bearer: Ludwig Wessely
- Medals Ranked 18th: Gold 2 Silver 0 Bronze 1 Total 3

Summer Olympics appearances (overview)
- 1896; 1900; ~~1904~~; 1908; 1912; 1920; 1924; 1928; 1932; 1936; 1948; 1952; 1956; 1960; 1964; 1968; 1972; 1976; 1980; 1984; 1988; 1992; 1996; 2000; 2004; 2008; 2012; 2016; 2020; 2024; 2028

Other related appearances
- 1906 Intercalated Games

Austria competed at the 1928 Summer Olympics in Amsterdam, Netherlands. 73 (67 men and 6 women) competitors took part in 39 events in 13 sports.

== Medalists ==
Medal	Name	Sport	Event	Date
Gold	Franz Andrysek	Weightlifting	Men's 60 kg	28 July
Gold	Hans Haas	Weightlifting	Men's 67.5 kg	28 July
Bronze	Leo Losert, Viktor Flessl	Rowing	Men's double sculls	10 August

== Athletics ==
Four athletes (2 men and 2 women) competed for Austria in 1928. It was the nation's fifth appearance in the sport. It was the first time that women's athletics events appeared at the Olympics. Bartoletta reached the finals in the discus throw, finishing 6th overall. It was Austria's best place in an athletics event since 1900 (a 5th-place finish in the men's steeplechase).

Men

Track & road events

Athlete	Event	Heat		Quarterfinal		Semifinal		Final	
Athlete	Event	Result	Rank	Result	Rank	Result	Rank	Result	Rank
Hermann Geißler	100 m	11.2	3	did not advance					
Hermann Geißler	200 m	22.4	1 Q	Unknown	4	did not advance			
Hermann Geißler	400 m	50.2	1 Q	Unknown	5	did not advance			
Ludwig Wessely	110 m hurdles	—N/a		Unknown	3	did not advance			

Combined events – Decathlon

Athlete	Event	100 m	LJ	SP	HJ	400 m	110H	DT	PV	JT	1500 m	Final	Rank
Ludwig Wessely	Result	11.6	6.73	12.58	1.70	52.2	15.8	35.46	3.20	47.44	4:47.0	6224	7
Ludwig Wessely	Points	683	750	642	544	710	728	573	406	551	637	6224	7

Women

Track & road events

Athlete	Event	Quarterfinal		Semifinal		Final	
Athlete	Event	Result	Rank	Result	Rank	Result	Rank
Josefine Lauterbach	800 m	—N/a		Unknown	8	did not advance	

Field events

Athlete	Event	Qualification		Final	
Athlete	Event	Distance	Position	Distance	Position
Liesl Perkaus	Discus throw	33.54	6 Q	33.54	6

== Boxing ==
Austria sent boxers to the Olympics for the second time. One boxer competed in the welterweight class. As with all 3 of Austria's boxers in 1924, Fraberger lost his first bout and placed 17th.

Men

Athlete	Event	Round of 32	Round of 16	Quarterfinals	Semifinals	Final	
Athlete	Event	Opposition Result	Opposition Result	Opposition Result	Opposition Result	Opposition Result	Rank
Johann Fraberger	Welterweight	Smillie (CAN); L points	did not advance				17

== Cycling ==
Two cyclists, both men, represented Austria in 1928. It was the nation's 3rd appearance in the sport, and 1st since 1912.

=== Track ===
Time trial

Athlete	Event	Time	Rank
Franz Dusika	Time trial	1:22.0	15

Sprint

Athlete	Event	1st Round	Repechage 1	Repechage Final	Quarterfinals	Semifinals	Final
Athlete	Event	Rank	Rank	Rank	Rank	Rank	Rank
August Schaffer	Sprint	3 r	3	Did not advance			

Tandem

Athletes	Event	1st Round		Semifinals		Final	
Athletes	Event	Time	Rank	Time	Rank	Time	Rank
Franz Dusika; August Schaffer	Tandem	–	2	did not advance			

== Diving ==
Two divers, one man and one woman, represented Austria in 1928. It was the nation's third appearance in the sport, and the first time that Austria sent a male diver. Bornett, who had finished 6th in the springboard event in 1924, finished 9th this time. Staudinger competed in both of the men's events, but placed 6th in his group in each and did not advance to the finals.

Diver	Event	Semifinals			Final		
Diver	Event	Points	Score	Rank	Points	Score	Rank
Josef Staudinger	Men's 3 m board	28	128.54	6	did not advance		
Klara Bornett	Women's 3 m board	—N/a			40	56.90	9
Josef Staudinger	Men's 10 m platform	26	73.32	6	did not advance		

== Equestrian ==
Three riders, all men, represented Austria in 1928. It was the nation's second appearance in the sport. Von Pongracz, who had placed 12th in the individual dressage in 1924, competed again; this time, he finished 13th. The Austrian team finished 6th in the team dressage competition (the first time that event was held).

Dressage

Athlete	Horse	Event	Score	Rank
Gustav Grachegg	Daniel	Dressage	191.96	21
Wilhelm Jaich	Graf	Dressage	204.16	14
Arthur von Pongracz	Turridu	Dressage	204.28	13
Gustav Grachegg; Wilhelm Jaich; Arthur von Pongracz	Daniel; Graf; Turridu	Team dressage	600.40	6

== Fencing ==
Six fencers, all men, represented Austria in 1928. It was the nation's 6th in the sport, in which Austria had competed at every Olympics except 1904.

Fencer	Event	Round 1		Quarterfinals		Semifinals		Final	
Fencer	Event	Result	Rank	Result	Rank	Result	Rank	Result	Rank
Richard Brünner	Men's foil	—N/a		3 wins	5	did not advance			
Kurt Ettinger	Men's foil	—N/a		5 wins	2 Q	2 wins	6	did not advance	
Hans Lion	Men's foil	—N/a		4 wins	2 Q	2 wins	5	did not advance	
Richard Brünner; Ernst Baylon; Kurt Ettinger; Hans Lion; Hans Schönbaumsfeld; Rudolf Berger	Men's team foil	1–1	2 Q	1–2	3	did not advance			

== Hockey ==
Austria competed in field hockey for the first time in 1928.

Summary

Team	Event	Group stage					Final / BM	
Team	Event	Opposition Score	Opposition Score	Opposition Score	Opposition Score	Rank	Opposition Score	Rank
Austria men's	Men's tournament	India; L 6–0	Denmark; L 3–1	Belgium; L 4–0	Switzerland; L 1–0	5	Did not advance	9

=== Men's tournament ===
Team roster

The following is the Austria roster in the men's field hockey tournament of the 1928 Summer Olympics.

- August Wildam
- Arthur Winter
- Alfred Revi
- Emil Haladik
- Fritz Steiner
- Erwin Nossig
- Fritz Herzl
- Fritz Lichtschein
- Hubert Lichtneckert
- Hans Rosenfeld
- Hans Wald
- Kurt Lehrfeld
- Karl Ördögh
- Josef Berger
- Paul Massarek
- Willi Machu

Group play

Pos	Team	Pld	W	D	L	GF	GA	GD	Pts	Qualification
1	India	4	4	0	0	26	0	+26	8	Gold medal match
2	Belgium	4	3	0	1	8	9	−1	6	Bronze medal match
3	Denmark	4	2	0	2	5	8	−3	4	
4	Switzerland	4	1	0	3	2	11	−9	2	
5	Austria	4	0	0	4	1	14	−13	0	

Source: 1928 Official Report, p. 685

17 May 1928
17:00

India	6–0	Austria
Chand 4', 6', ?', ?'; Shaukat ?'; Gateley ?'	Report

Umpires:
Ch. Roux (FRA)
F. Schiff (NED)

18 May 1928
19:00

Denmark	3–1	Austria
Holst 4', 6'; Heilbuth 34'	Report	Lichteneckert ?'

Umpires:
A. Broese van Croenou (NED)
R. Jassoy (GER)

22 May 1928
19:00

Belgium	4–0	Austria
Diercxsens ?', ?', ?'; Baudoux 68'	Report

Umpires:
E. W. C. Ricketts (IND)
B. Turnbull (IND)

24 May 1928
18:00

Switzerland	1–0	Austria
Fehr ?'	Report

Umpires:
T. Evekink (NED)
P. Regibo (BEL)

== Rowing ==
Two rowers, both men, represented Austria in 1928. It was the nation's 2nd appearance in the sport, and 1st since 1912. Flessl and Losert advanced to the semifinals of the men's double sculls. They were beaten twice by the American boat, once in round 2 and again in the semifinals. The latter defeat resulted in a bronze medal for the Austrians. It was Austria's first medal in rowing.

Athlete	Event	Round 1		Repechage 1		Round 2		Repechage 2		Round 3		Semifinals		Final	
Athlete	Event	Time	Rank	Time	Rank	Time	Rank	Time	Rank	Time	Rank	Time	Rank	Time	Rank
Viktor Flessl; Leo Losert	Men's double sculls	7:55.8	1 Q	Bye		6:55.6	2 R	7:32.6	1 Q	6:46.4	1 Q	6:48.8	2 ( (bronze) )	did not advance	

== Sailing ==
One sailor competed for Austria in 1928. It was the nation's debut in the sport. Johanny was unable to advance to the final series in the 12' Dinghy competition.

Men

Athlete	Event	Preliminary series				Net points	Final rank	Final series				Net points	Final rank
Athlete	Event	1	2	3	4	Net points	Final rank	1	2	3	4	Net points	Final rank
Robert Johanny	12' Dinghy	9	RET	RET	DNS	39	19	Did not advance					

== Swimming ==
Three swimmers, one man and two women, represented Austria in 1928. It was the nation's 6th appearance in the sport, and first since 1912. Schäfer was the only Austrian swimmer to advance to the semifinals; none reached an event final.

Athlete	Event	Heat		Semifinal		Final	
Athlete	Event	Time	Rank	Time	Rank	Time	Rank
Fritzi Löwy	Women's 400 m freestyle	6:20.0	3	did not advance			
Karl Schäfer	Men's 200 m breaststroke	2:56.6	2 Q	Unknown	4	did not advance	
Hedwig Bienenfeld	Women's 200 m breaststroke	Unknown	4	did not advance			

== Weightlifting ==
Ten men represented Austria in weightlifting in 1928. Austria was one of five nations to have the maximum 2 weightlifters in each weight class. It was the nation's 2nd appearance in the sport. The Austrians had the most success at the lighter end of the competition, with Andrysek winning the featherweight and Haas sharing gold in the lightweight (with Kurt Helbig of Germany). They were Austria's first Olympic gold medalists in weightlifting; the best results for the county in 1924 had been silver medals. Andrysek and Haas also set Olympic records in 2 of the 3 lifts as well as totals; Andrysek's total was a world record, and both men's snatch lifts matched the standing world record. Leppelt also contributed to the record books with an Olympic record (shared three ways) in the snatch.

Athlete	Event	Press		Snatch		Clean & jerk		Total	Rank
Athlete	Event	Result	Rank	Result	Rank	Result	Rank	Total	Rank
Franz Andrysek	Men's −60 kg	77.5	7	90 OR	1	120 OR, =WR	1	287.5 WR	1st place, gold medalist(s)
Andreas Stadler	Men's −60 kg	72.5	12	80	7	115	2	267.5	6
Hans Haas	Men's −67.5 kg	85	6	102.5 OR	1	135 OR, =WR	1	322.5 OR	1st place, gold medalist(s)
Anton Hangel	Men's −67.5 kg	77.5	10	90	4	120	3	287.5	7
Karl Hipfinger	Men's −75 kg	82.5	13	95	5	–	19	177.5	20
Franz Nitterl	Men's −75 kg	–	22	did not finish				0	22
Karl Freiberger	Men's −82.5 kg	95	5	95	7	132.5	5	322.5	6
Josef Zemann	Men's −82.5 kg	75	14	105	3	135	4	315	7
Josef Leppelt	Men's +82.5 kg	105	5	110 OR	1	140	4	355	5
Rudolf Schilberg	Men's +82.5 kg	115	3	105	6	135	7	355	5

== Wrestling ==
Two men represented Austria in wrestling in 1928. It was the nation's 3rd appearance in the sport; all of the Austrian wrestlers to date, including 1928, had competed in the Greco-Roman events. Wiesberger had Austria's best-yet result in the sport, placing 4th in the Greco-Roman heavyweight.

Athlete	Event	Round 1	Round 2	Round 3	Round 4	Round 5	Round 6	Round 7	Rank
Athlete	Event	Opposition Result	Opposition Result	Opposition Result	Opposition Result	Opposition Result	Opposition Result	Opposition Result	Rank
Ludwig Schlanger	Men's GR featherweight	Väli (EST); L Decision 3pts	Kárpáti (HUN); L Fall 6pts	Did not advance					14
Eugen Wiesberger Sr.	Men's GR heavyweight	Zvejnieks (LAT); W Decision 1pt	Sobh (EGY); W Fall 1pt	Nyström (FIN); L Decision 4pts	Badó (HUN); W Fall 4pts	Urban (TCH); W Decision 5pts	Did not advance	—N/a	4
