= Latvia at the 1928 Summer Olympics =

- IOC code: LAT
- NOC: Latvian Olympic Committee

in Amsterdam
- Competitors: 15 (13 men, 2 women) (Note: Art competitions were held as part of the 1928 Summer Olympics, and Latvia had two participants in these competitions. However, the International Olympic Committee later classified these art competitions as unofficial Olympic events, and these do not appear in the IOC database. The medals were not counted towards the final medal tally.) in 5 sports
- Flag bearer: Alberts Zvejnieks
- Medals: Gold 0 Silver 0 Bronze 0 Total 0

Summer Olympics appearances (overview)
- 1924; 1928; 1932; 1936; 1948–1988; 1992; 1996; 2000; 2004; 2008; 2012; 2016; 2020; 2024

Other related appearances
- Russian Empire (1908–1912); Soviet Union (1952–1988)

Latvia participated at the 1928 Summer Olympics in Amsterdam, Netherlands held between 28 July and 12 August 1928. The country's participation in the Games marked its second appearance at the Summer Olympics since its debut in the 1924 Games.

The Latvian team consisted of 15 athletes who competed across five sports. Alberts Zvejnieks served as the country's flag-bearer during the opening ceremony. Latvia did not win any medal in the Games, and had not won an Olympic medal previously.

== Background ==
The 1924 Summer Olympics marked Latvia's first participation in the Olympic Games. After the nation made its debut in the Summer Olympics at the 1924 Games, this edition of the Games in 1928 marked the nation's second appearance at the Summer Games.

The 1928 Summer Olympics was held in Amsterdam, Netherlands between 28 July and 12 August 1928. The Latvian team consisted of 15 athletes who competed across five sports. Alberts Zvejnieks served as the country's flag-bearer during the opening ceremony. Latvia did not win any medal in the Games, and had not won an Olympic medal previously.

== Competitors ==
Latvia sent 15 athletes who competed in five sports at the Games.

Sport	Men	Women	Athletes
Athletics	4	2	6
Cycling	5	0	5
Sailing	1	0	1
Weightlifting	1	0	1
Wrestling	2	0	2
Total	13	2	15

== Athletics ==
Athletics competitions were held between 29 July and 5 August 1928 at the Olympisch Stadion in Amsterdam. Women were allowed to compete in the event for the first time. Latvia had six participants including two women in the Games. Staņislavs Petkēvičs participated in two of the men's events, and achieved a best place result of seventh in the 5000 m race. In the Marathon event, Artūrs Motmillers was classified 38th and Vilis Cimmermanis did not finish the event. None of the other athletes advanced to the final in their respective competitions.

Track & road events

Athlete	Event	Heat		Final	
Athlete	Event	Result	Rank	Result	Rank
Staņislavs Petkēvičs	Men's 5000 m	15:03.0	3 Q	Unknown	7
Staņislavs Petkēvičs	Men's 10000 m	—N/a		Unknown	15
Artūrs Motmillers	Marathon	—N/a		2:56:45	38
Vilis Cimmermanis	Marathon	—N/a		DNF	
Zinaīda Liepiņa	Women's 100 m	Unknown	3	Did not advance	

Ranks given are within the heat.

Field events

Athlete	Event	Qualification		Final	
Athlete	Event	Distance	Position	Distance	Position
Jānis Jordāns	Men's Discus	42.78	12	Did not advance	
Elfrīda Karlsone	Women's Discus	30.60	14	Did not advance	

== Cycling ==
Cycling competitions were held at the Olympisch Stadion in Amsterdam. Five cyclists, all men, represented Latvia in two events at the Games. In both the events, Latvia did not qualify for the final rounds.

Track cycling

Cyclist	Event	First round		First repechage		Quarterfinals		Semifinals		Final	
Cyclist	Event	Result	Rank	Result	Rank	Result	Rank	Result	Rank	Result	Rank
Roberts Plūme	Sprint	Unknown	3 r	Unknown	3	Did not advance					
Roberts Ozols; Zenons Popovs; Ernests Mālers; Fridrihs Ukstiņš	Team pursuit	Unknown	2	—N/a		Did not advance					

Ranks given are within the heat.

== Sailing ==
Sailing competitions were held at Buiten-IJ in Amsterdam. Latvia had a lone participant Kurts Klāsens in the 12' Dinghy event. In the event, eight races were held amongst 20 competitors who were separated into two groups of 10. The groups were changed across races. Top ten finishes from the first four races advanced to the final four races. Final placements were determined by the summation of ordinal ranks in all eight individual races, with the lowest scorers awarded the medals. Klāsens qualified for the final four races by virtue of a tenth place finish after the first four races. He was classified tenth in the final classification.

Sailor	Event	First Round	Final
Sailor	Event	Rank	Rank
Kurts Klāsens	12' Dinghy	10 Q	10

== Weightlifting ==
Weightlifting competitions were held at Krachtsportgebouw in Amsterdam. Latvia had a lone participant Kārlis Leilands in the heavyweight category. In the event, Leilands lifted a total of 355 kg (783 lb) to be ranked fourth. He missed out on the bronze medal by 2.5 kg (5.5 lb).

Athlete	Event	Press	Snatch	Clean & Jerk	Total	Rank
Kārlis Leilands	Men's +82.5 kg	110.0	105.0	140.0	355.0	4

== Wrestling ==
Wrestling competitions were held at Krachtsportgebouw in Amsterdam. Latvia had two participants in the event. Kārlis Pētersons and Alberts Zvejnieks had similar results in the light heavyweight and heavyweight categories. Both lost one of their two bouts in the initial rounds, before bowing out in the quarterfinals.

Greco–Roman

Athlete	Event	Round 1	Round 2	Quarterfinal	Semifinal	Final	
Athlete	Event	Opposition Result	Opposition Result	Opposition Result	Opposition Result	Opposition Result	Rank
Kārlis Pētersons	Men's light heavyweight	Szalay (HUN); L	Juhasz (YUG); W	Pellinen (FIN); L	Did not advance		=8
Alberts Zvejnieks	Men's heavyweight	Wiesberger, Sr. (AUT); L	Briola (ARG); W	Badó (HUN); L	Did not advance		=9

== Art competitions ==
The art competition consisted a competition between various entries to be sent by the National Olympic Committees across the specified categories. These were exhibited at the Stedelijk Museum on 12 June 1928. Latvia had two competitors in the art competitions, Friedrich Baur, and Konstantīns Visotskis in the painting competitions.

Art competitions were awarded medals as part of the Games. However, the International Olympic Committee later classified these art competitions as unofficial Olympic events, and these do not appear in the IOC database. The medals were not counted towards the final medal tally.
