= Wrestling at the 1928 Summer Olympics – Men's Greco-Roman heavyweight =

Men's heavyweight Greco-Roman wrestling at the Games of the IX Olympiad
- Venue: Krachtsportgebouw
- Dates: August 2–5, 1928
- Competitors: 15 from 15 nations

Medalists
1st place, gold medalist(s)		Rudolf Svensson	Sweden
2nd place, silver medalist(s)		Hjalmar Nyström	Finland
3rd place, bronze medalist(s)		Georg Gehring	Germany

The men's Greco-Roman heavyweight was one of thirteen wrestling events held as part of the wrestling at the 1928 Summer Olympics programme. The competition was held from August 2 to 5, and featured 15 wrestlers from 15 nations. Heavyweight was the heaviest category, including wrestlers weighing over 82.5 kilograms (181.9 lb).

== Competition format ==
This Greco-Roman wrestling competition introduced an elimination system based on the accumulation of points. Each round featured all wrestlers pairing off and wrestling one bout (with one wrestler having a bye if there were an odd number). The loser received 3 points. The winner received 1 point if the win was by decision and 0 points if the win was by fall. At the end of each round, any wrestler with at least 5 points was eliminated.

== Results ==
=== Round 1 ===
The first round produced 4 winners by fall (0 points), 1 bye (0 points), 3 winners by decision (1 point), and 7 losers (3 points).

Bouts

Winner	Nation	Victory Type	Loser	Nation
Josef Urban	Czechoslovakia	Fall	Gustave Colpaert	Belgium
Aleardo Donati	Italy	Fall	Simon de Lanfranchi	France
Georg Gehring	Germany	Fall	Emil Larsen	Denmark
Mehmet Çoban	Turkey	Decision	Jorge Briola	Argentina
Eugen Wiesberger Sr.	Austria	Decision	Alberts Zvejnieks	Latvia
Rajmund Badó	Hungary	Fall	Ibrahim Sobh	Egypt
Rudolf Svensson	Sweden	Decision	Hjalmar Nyström	Finland
Jacob Simonis	Netherlands	Bye	N/A	N/A

Points

Rank	Wrestler	Nation	R1
1	Rajmund Badó	Hungary	0
1	Aleardo Donati	Italy	0
1	Georg Gehring	Germany	0
1	Jacob Simonis	Netherlands	0
1	Josef Urban	Czechoslovakia	0
6	Mehmet Çoban	Turkey	1
6	Rudolf Svensson	Sweden	1
6	Eugen Wiesberger Sr.	Austria	1
9	Jorge Briola	Argentina	3
9	Gustave Colpaert	Belgium	3
9	Simon de Lanfranchi	France	3
9	Emil Larsen	Denmark	3
9	Hjalmar Nyström	Finland	3
9	Ibrahim Sobh	Egypt	3
9	Alberts Zvejnieks	Latvia	3

=== Round 2 ===
All 7 bouts were won by fall, with none of the winners gaining any points. Donati, Gehring, and Urban stayed at 0; Çoban, Svensson (with a bye), and Weisberger stayed at 1; Nyström and Zvejnieks stayed at 3. Also with 3 points were Badó and Simonis, after their first loss each. The other 5 round 2 losers had also lost in round 1; they were eliminated.

Bouts

Winner	Nation	Victory Type	Loser	Nation
Josef Urban	Czechoslovakia	Fall	Jacob Simonis	Netherlands
Aleardo Donati	Italy	Fall	Gustave Colpaert	Belgium
Georg Gehring	Germany	Fall	Simon de Lanfranchi	France
Mehmet Çoban	Turkey	Fall	Emil Larsen	Denmark
Alberts Zvejnieks	Latvia	Fall	Jorge Briola	Argentina
Eugen Wiesberger Sr.	Austria	Fall	Ibrahim Sobh	Egypt
Hjalmar Nyström	Finland	Fall	Rajmund Badó	Hungary
Rudolf Svensson	Sweden	Bye	N/A	N/A

Points

Rank	Wrestler	Nation	R1	R2	Total
1	Aleardo Donati	Italy	0	0	0
1	Josef Urban	Czechoslovakia	0	0	0
1	Georg Gehring	Germany	0	0	0
4	Mehmet Çoban	Turkey	1	0	1
4	Rudolf Svensson	Sweden	1	0	1
4	Eugen Wiesberger Sr.	Austria	1	0	1
7	Rajmund Badó	Hungary	0	3	3
7	Hjalmar Nyström	Finland	3	0	3
7	Jacob Simonis	Netherlands	0	3	3
7	Alberts Zvejnieks	Latvia	3	0	3
11	Jorge Briola	Argentina	3	3	6
11	Gustave Colpaert	Belgium	3	3	6
11	Simon de Lanfranchi	France	3	3	6
11	Emil Larsen	Denmark	3	3	6
11	Ibrahim Sobh	Egypt	3	3	6

=== Round 3 ===
The Urban–Donati and Gehring–Çoban bouts each featured 2 wrestlers with fewer than 2 points and therefore no elimination possible for either wrestler in the bout. The Nyström–Wiesberger bout also ended in no eliminations, as Nyström won by decision to leave both wrestlers at 4 points. Zvejnieks and Simonis were eliminated. Urban was the only man left with 0 points; Gehring and Svensson also remained below 2 points and thus safe from elimination in the next round.

Bouts

Winner	Nation	Victory Type	Loser	Nation
Rudolf Svensson	Sweden	Fall	Jacob Simonis	Netherlands
Josef Urban	Czechoslovakia	Fall	Aleardo Donati	Italy
Georg Gehring	Germany	Decision	Mehmet Çoban	Turkey
Rajmund Badó	Hungary	Fall	Alberts Zvejnieks	Latvia
Hjalmar Nyström	Finland	Decision	Eugen Wiesberger Sr.	Austria

Points

Rank	Wrestler	Nation	R1	R2	R3	Total
1	Josef Urban	Czechoslovakia	0	0	0	0
2	Georg Gehring	Germany	0	0	1	1
2	Rudolf Svensson	Sweden	1	0	0	1
4	Rajmund Badó	Hungary	0	3	0	3
4	Aleardo Donati	Italy	0	0	3	3
6	Mehmet Çoban	Turkey	1	0	3	4
6	Hjalmar Nyström	Finland	3	0	1	4
6	Eugen Wiesberger Sr.	Austria	1	0	3	4
9	Jacob Simonis	Netherlands	0	3	3	6
9	Alberts Zvejnieks	Latvia	3	0	3	6

=== Round 4 ===
All 4 bouts this round were won by fall; Nyström and Wiesberger needed to win that way to continue, as they started (and ended) with 4 points. Svensson and Gehring each stayed at 1 point, now in the lead as Urban took his first loss and moved to 3 points. The other three losers, Badó, Çoban, and Donati, were eliminated.

Bouts

Winner	Nation	Victory Type	Loser	Nation
Rudolf Svensson	Sweden	Fall	Josef Urban	Czechoslovakia
Georg Gehring	Germany	Fall	Aleardo Donati	Italy
Hjalmar Nyström	Finland	Fall	Mehmet Çoban	Turkey
Eugen Wiesberger Sr.	Austria	Fall	Rajmund Badó	Hungary

Points

Rank	Wrestler	Nation	R1	R2	R3	R4	Total
1	Georg Gehring	Germany	0	0	1	0	1
1	Rudolf Svensson	Sweden	1	0	0	0	1
3	Josef Urban	Czechoslovakia	0	0	0	3	3
4	Hjalmar Nyström	Finland	3	0	1	0	4
4	Eugen Wiesberger Sr.	Austria	1	0	3	0	4
6	Rajmund Badó	Hungary	0	3	0	3	6
7	Aleardo Donati	Italy	0	0	3	3	6
8	Mehmet Çoban	Turkey	1	0	3	3	7

=== Round 5 ===
The two leaders faced off (neither could be eliminated, however), with Svensson prevailing (ultimately securing himself the gold medal). Urban, who had 0 points after 3 rounds, now had 6 points after two consecutive losses and was eliminated in 5th place. Wiesberger was also eliminated in his victory over Urban, as he needed a win by fall to continue but won by decision instead. Nyström had a bye.

Bouts

Winner	Nation	Victory Type	Loser	Nation
Rudolf Svensson	Sweden	Fall	Georg Gehring	Germany
Eugen Wiesberger Sr.	Austria	Decision	Josef Urban	Czechoslovakia
Hjalmar Nyström	Finland	Bye	N/A	N/A

Points

Rank	Wrestler	Nation	R1	R2	R3	R4	R5	Total
1	Rudolf Svensson	Sweden	1	0	0	0	0	1
2	Georg Gehring	Germany	0	0	1	0	3	4
2	Hjalmar Nyström	Finland	3	0	1	0	0	4
4	Eugen Wiesberger Sr.	Austria	1	0	3	0	1	5
5	Josef Urban	Czechoslovakia	0	0	0	3	3	6

=== Round 6 ===
The only bout possible was Nyström against Gehring, as Svensson had already faced each of the other wrestlers. Svensson thus ended up with his second bye of the tournament and the gold medal.

Bouts

Winner	Nation	Victory Type	Loser	Nation
Hjalmar Nyström	Finland	Decision	Georg Gehring	Germany
Rudolf Svensson	Sweden	Bye	N/A	N/A

Points

Rank	Wrestler	Nation	R1	R2	R3	R4	R5	R6	Total
1st place, gold medalist(s)	Rudolf Svensson	Sweden	1	0	0	0	0	0	1
2nd place, silver medalist(s)	Hjalmar Nyström	Finland	3	0	1	0	0	1	5
3rd place, bronze medalist(s)	Georg Gehring	Germany	0	0	1	0	3	3	7
