= Wrestling at the 1932 Summer Olympics – Men's Greco-Roman heavyweight =

Men's Greco-Roman heavyweight at the Games of the X Olympiad
- Venue: Grand Olympic Auditorium
- Dates: 4–7 August 1932
- Competitors: 5 from 5 nations

Medalists
1st place, gold medalist(s)		Carl Westergren	Sweden
2nd place, silver medalist(s)		Josef Urban	Czechoslovakia
3rd place, bronze medalist(s)		Nickolaus Hirschl	Austria

The men's Greco-Roman heavyweight competition at the 1932 Summer Olympics in Los Angeles took place from 4 August to 7 August at the Grand Olympic Auditorium. Nations were limited to one competitor. This weight class was not limited by maximum weight and was open to wrestlers above 87kg.

This Greco-Roman wrestling competition followed the same format that was introduced at the 1928 Summer Olympics, using an elimination system based on the accumulation of points. Each round featured all wrestlers pairing off and wrestling one bout (with one wrestler having a bye if there were an odd number). The loser received 3 points. The winner received 1 point if the win was by decision and 0 points if the win was by fall. At the end of each round, any wrestler with at least 5 points was eliminated.

== Schedule ==
Date	Event
4 August 1932	Round 1
5 August 1932	Round 2
6 August 1932	Round 3
7 August 1932	Final round

== Results ==
=== Round 1 ===
Hirschl had the first round bye and was the only wrestler to advance with 0 points. Both bouts were won by decision, with the winners Gehring and Westergren receiving 1 point and the losers Donati and Urban receiving 3.

Bouts

Winner	Nation	Victory Type	Loser	Nation
George Gehring	Germany	Decision	Aleardo Donati	Italy
Carl Westergren	Sweden	Decision	Josef Urban	Czechoslovakia
Nickolaus Hirschl	Austria	Bye	N/A	N/A

Points

Rank	Wrestler	Nation	Start	Earned	Total
1	Nickolaus Hirschl	Austria	0	0	0
2	George Gehring	Germany	0	1	1
2	Carl Westergren	Sweden	0	1	1
4	Aleardo Donati	Italy	0	3	3
4	Josef Urban	Czechoslovakia	0	3	3

=== Round 2 ===
Hirschl won by fall, maintaining his 0 points and eliminating Donati. In the match between the two first-round winners, Gehring won by decision to pick up a second point while pushing Westergren to 4 points. Urban's bye kept him at 3 points.

Bouts

Winner	Nation	Victory Type	Loser	Nation
Nickolaus Hirschl	Austria	Fall	Aleardo Donati	Italy
George Gehring	Germany	Decision	Carl Westergren	Sweden
Josef Urban	Czechoslovakia	Bye	N/A	N/A

Points

Rank	Wrestler	Nation	Start	Earned	Total
1	Nickolaus Hirschl	Austria	0	0	0
2	George Gehring	Germany	1	1	2
3	Josef Urban	Czechoslovakia	3	0	3
4	Carl Westergren	Sweden	1	3	4
5	Aleardo Donati	Italy	3	3	6

=== Round 3 ===
Hirschl received his first points, 3 for a loss to Westergren. Westergren needed to win by fall rather than decision to stay in competition; he did, remaining at 4 points. Urban picked up a fourth point by winning by decision over Gehring, who was eliminated at 5 points.

Bouts

Winner	Nation	Victory Type	Loser	Nation
Josef Urban	Czechoslovakia	Decision	George Gehring	Germany
Carl Westergren	Sweden	Fall	Nickolaus Hirschl	Austria

Points

Rank	Wrestler	Nation	Start	Earned	Total
1	Nickolaus Hirschl	Austria	0	3	3
2	Josef Urban	Czechoslovakia	3	1	4
2	Carl Westergren	Sweden	4	0	4
4	George Gehring	Germany	2	3	5

=== Final round ===
Urban defeated Hirschl, eliminating the latter (who took the bronze medal). Westergren and Urban were the last two wrestlers; as Westergren had previously defeated Urban, the Swede took the gold medal.

Bouts

Winner	Nation	Victory Type	Loser	Nation
Josef Urban	Czechoslovakia	Fall	Nickolaus Hirschl	Austria
Carl Westergren	Sweden	Bye	N/A	N/A

Points

Rank	Wrestler	Nation	Start	Earned	Total
1st place, gold medalist(s)	Carl Westergren	Sweden	4	0	4
2nd place, silver medalist(s)	Josef Urban	Czechoslovakia	4	0	4
3rd place, bronze medalist(s)	Nickolaus Hirschl	Austria	3	3	6
