= Wrestling at the 1928 Summer Olympics – Men's Greco-Roman light heavyweight =

Men's light heavyweight Greco-Roman wrestling at the Games of the IX Olympiad
- Venue: Krachtsportgebouw
- Dates: August 2–5, 1928
- Competitors: 17 from 17 nations

Medalists
1st place, gold medalist(s)		Ibrahim Moustafa	Egypt
2nd place, silver medalist(s)		Adolf Rieger	Germany
3rd place, bronze medalist(s)		Onni Pellinen	Finland

The men's Greco-Roman light heavyweight was one of thirteen wrestling events held as part of the wrestling at the 1928 Summer Olympics programme. The competition was held from August 2 to 5, and featured 17 wrestlers from 17 nations. Light heavyweight was the second heaviest category, including wrestlers weighing 75 to 82.5 kilograms (165.3 to 181.9 lb).

== Competition format ==
This Greco-Roman wrestling competition introduced an elimination system based on the accumulation of points. Each round featured all wrestlers pairing off and wrestling one bout (with one wrestler having a bye if there were an odd number). The loser received 3 points. The winner received 1 point if the win was by decision and 0 points if the win was by fall. At the end of each round, any wrestler with at least 5 points was eliminated.

== Results ==
=== Round 1 ===
The first round produced 4 winners by fall (0 points), 1 bye (0 points), 4 winners by decision (1 point), and 8 losers (3 points). Westergren withdrew after his bout.

Bouts

Winner	Nation	Victory Type	Loser	Nation
Adolf Rieger	Germany	Decision	Ejnar Hansen	Denmark
Robert Gaupset	Norway	Fall	Johan Heijm	Netherlands
Otto Pohla	Estonia	Fall	Max Studer	Switzerland
Onni Pellinen	Finland	Decision	Carl Westergren	Sweden
Imre Szalay	Hungary	Fall	Kārlis Pētersons	Latvia
Josef Vávra	Czechoslovakia	Decision	Bela Juhasz	Yugoslavia
Émile Clody	France	Decision	A. Şefik	Turkey
Ibrahim Moustafa	Egypt	Fall	Nicolas Appels	Belgium
Jan Gałuszka	Poland	Bye	N/A	N/A

Points

Rank	Wrestler	Nation	R1
1	Jan Gałuszka	Poland	0
1	Robert Gaupset	Norway	0
1	Ibrahim Moustafa	Egypt	0
1	Otto Pohla	Estonia	0
1	Imre Szalay	Hungary	0
6	Émile Clody	France	1
6	Onni Pellinen	Finland	1
6	Adolf Rieger	Germany	1
6	Josef Vávra	Czechoslovakia	1
10	Nicolas Appels	Belgium	3
10	Ejnar Hansen	Denmark	3
10	Johan Heijm	Netherlands	3
10	Bela Juhasz	Yugoslavia	3
10	Kārlis Pētersons	Latvia	3
10	A. Şefik	Turkey	3
10	Max Studer	Switzerland	3
17	Carl Westergren	Sweden	3*

=== Round 2 ===
None of the men who started the round with 0 points finished it that sway; Szalay and Moustafa received 1 point after winning by decision, while the other 3 lost. They were the only 2 to have a point total low enough to withstand a loss after this round. Pellinen and Rieger each had 2 points after winning both of their bouts by decision. The other 9 remaining wrestlers each had a loss. Only three men were eliminated with their second loss in round 2.

Bouts

Winner	Nation	Victory Type	Loser	Nation
Ejnar Hansen	Denmark	Fall	Jan Gałuszka	Poland
Adolf Rieger	Germany	Decision	Robert Gaupset	Norway
Johan Heijm	Netherlands	Fall	Max Studer	Switzerland
Onni Pellinen	Finland	Decision	Otto Pohla	Estonia
Imre Szalay	Hungary	Decision	Josef Vávra	Czechoslovakia
Kārlis Pētersons	Latvia	Fall	Bela Juhasz	Yugoslavia
Nicolas Appels	Belgium	Fall	Émile Clody	France
Ibrahim Moustafa	Egypt	Decision	A. Şefik	Turkey

Points

Rank	Wrestler	Nation	R1	R2	Total
1	Ibrahim Moustafa	Egypt	0	1	1
1	Imre Szalay	Hungary	0	1	1
3	Onni Pellinen	Finland	1	1	2
3	Adolf Rieger	Germany	1	1	2
5	Nicolas Appels	Belgium	3	0	3
5	Jan Gałuszka	Poland	0	3	3
5	Robert Gaupset	Norway	0	3	3
5	Ejnar Hansen	Denmark	3	0	3
5	Johan Heijm	Netherlands	3	0	3
5	Kārlis Pētersons	Latvia	3	0	3
5	Otto Pohla	Estonia	0	3	3
5	Josef Vávra	Czechoslovakia	1	3	4
13	Émile Clody	France	1	3	4
14	Bela Juhasz	Yugoslavia	3	3	6
14	A. Şefik	Turkey	3	3	6
14	Max Studer	Switzerland	3	3	6

=== Round 3 ===
The third round featured 4 out of 6 bouts where the winner was guaranteed to advance and the loser guaranteed elimination. Vávra needed to win by fall to avoid elimination; he did. The sixth bout was between Szalay (1 point) and Clody (4 points); the former would advance even if he lost while the latter could be eliminated even with a win, it was by decision. That is exactly what happened; Clody's decision eliminated him but left Szalay at 4 points and still in contention. Moustafa had the bye and stayed at 1 point, now in sole possession of the lead.

Bouts

Winner	Nation	Victory Type	Loser	Nation
Adolf Rieger	Germany	Fall	Jan Gałuszka	Poland
Ejnar Hansen	Denmark	Fall	Robert Gaupset	Norway
Otto Pohla	Estonia	Fall	Johan Heijm	Netherlands
Onni Pellinen	Finland	Fall	Kārlis Pētersons	Latvia
Émile Clody	France	Decision	Imre Szalay	Hungary
Nicolas Appels	Belgium	Fall	Josef Vávra	Czechoslovakia
Ibrahim Moustafa	Egypt	Bye	N/A	N/A

Points

Rank	Wrestler	Nation	R1	R2	R3	Total
1	Ibrahim Moustafa	Egypt	0	1	0	1
2	Onni Pellinen	Finland	1	1	0	2
2	Adolf Rieger	Germany	1	1	0	2
4	Nicolas Appels	Belgium	3	0	0	3
4	Ejnar Hansen	Denmark	3	0	0	3
4	Otto Pohla	Estonia	0	3	0	3
7	Imre Szalay	Hungary	0	1	3	4
8	Émile Clody	France	1	3	1	5
9	Jan Gałuszka	Poland	0	3	3	6
9	Robert Gaupset	Norway	0	3	3	6
9	Johan Heijm	Netherlands	3	0	3	6
9	Kārlis Pētersons	Latvia	3	0	3	6
9	Josef Vávra	Czechoslovakia	1	3	3	7

=== Round 4 ===
The three losers were eliminated. The three winners, and Appels on a bye, continued on.

Bouts

Winner	Nation	Victory Type	Loser	Nation
Ibrahim Moustafa	Egypt	Fall	Ejnar Hansen	Denmark
Adolf Rieger	Germany	Decision	Otto Pohla	Estonia
Onni Pellinen	Finland	Fall	Imre Szalay	Hungary
Nicolas Appels	Belgium	Bye	N/A	N/A

Points

Rank	Wrestler	Nation	R1	R2	R3	R4	Total
1	Ibrahim Moustafa	Egypt	0	1	0	0	1
2	Onni Pellinen	Finland	1	1	0	0	2
3	Nicolas Appels	Belgium	3	0	0	0	3
3	Adolf Rieger	Germany	1	1	0	1	3
5	Ejnar Hansen	Denmark	3	0	0	3	6
6	Imre Szalay	Hungary	0	1	3	3	6
7	Otto Pohla	Estonia	0	3	0	3	6

=== Round 5 ===
Pellinen and Appels were eliminated, with the bronze medal and 4th place, respectively. Rieger and Moustafa, both undefeated, advanced to face each other in a de facto gold medal bout.

Bouts

Winner	Nation	Victory Type	Loser	Nation
Adolf Rieger	Germany	Fall	Nicolas Appels	Belgium
Ibrahim Moustafa	Egypt	Decision	Onni Pellinen	Finland

Points

Rank	Wrestler	Nation	R1	R2	R3	R4	R5	Total
1	Ibrahim Moustafa	Egypt	0	1	0	0	1	2
2	Adolf Rieger	Germany	1	1	0	1	0	3
3rd place, bronze medalist(s)	Onni Pellinen	Finland	1	1	0	0	3	5
4	Nicolas Appels	Belgium	3	0	0	0	3	6

=== Round 6 ===
Moustafa defeated Rieger to take the gold medal.

Bouts

Winner	Nation	Victory Type	Loser	Nation
Ibrahim Moustafa	Egypt	Decision	Adolf Rieger	Germany

Points

Rank	Wrestler	Nation	R1	R2	R3	R4	R5	R6	Total
1st place, gold medalist(s)	Ibrahim Moustafa	Egypt	0	1	0	0	1	1	3
2nd place, silver medalist(s)	Adolf Rieger	Germany	1	1	0	1	0	3	6
