= Rudolf Bosshard =

Swiss rower

Personal information
- Born: 1890
- Died: 7 February 1980 (aged 89–90)

Sport
- Sport: Rowing
- Club: Grasshopper Club Zürich
Medal record
Men's rowing
Representing Switzerland
Olympic Games
Bronze medal – third place	1924 Paris	Double sculls
European Rowing Championships
Gold medal – first place	1920 Mâcon	Eight
Gold medal – first place	1922 Barcelona	Single sculls
Gold medal – first place	1923 Como	Single sculls
Gold medal – first place	1923 Como	Double sculls
Gold medal – first place	1924 Zürich	Double sculls
Silver medal – second place	1925 Prague	Double sculls
Gold medal – first place	1926 Lucerne	Double sculls
Gold medal – first place	1927 Como	Double sculls

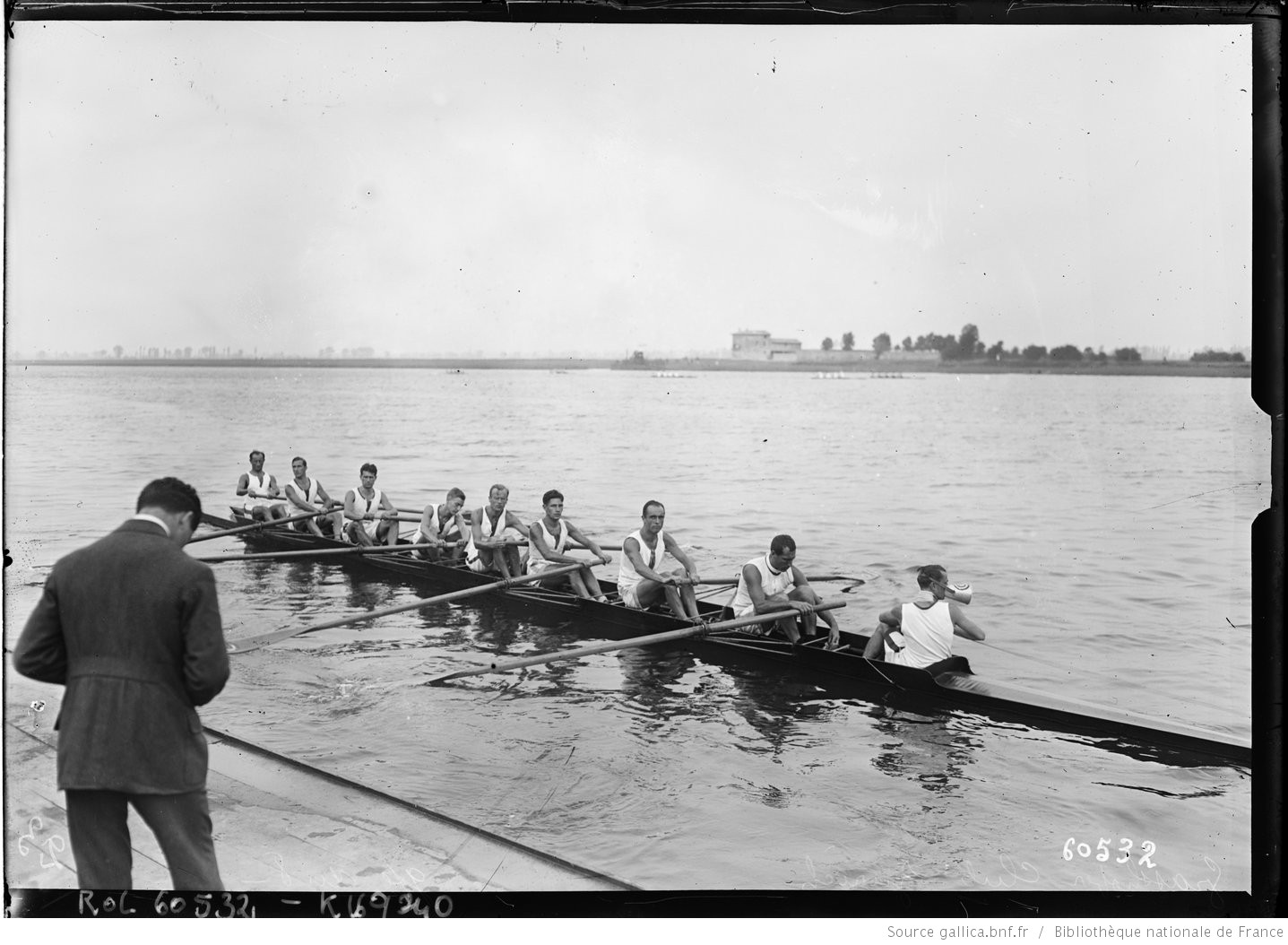
Rudolf Bosshard rowing with national team

Rudolf Bosshard (1890 – 7 February 1980) was a Swiss rower who competed in the 1920 Summer Olympics, in the 1924 Summer Olympics, and in the 1928 Summer Olympics.

In 1920 he was a member of the Swiss boat which was eliminated in the first round of the eight event. Four years later he won the bronze medal with his partner Heini Thoma in the double sculls event. In 1928 he finished seventh with his partner Maurice Rieder after being eliminated in the quarter finals of the double sculls competition.
