= Polish Ice Hockey Federation =

Governing body of ice hockey in Poland

Poland
- Association name: Polski Związek Hokeja na Lodzie
- IIHF Code: POL
- IIHF membership: January 11, 1926
- Association history: founded in Warsaw (February 22, 1925)
- President: Dawid Chwałka (since March 14, 2014)
- IIHF men's ranking: 20 (▼1) (3 June 2026)
- IIHF women's ranking: 20 (▼1) (21 April 2025)

The Polish Ice Hockey Federation (Polish: Polski Związek Hokeja na Lodzie, PZHL) is the governing body that oversees ice hockey in Poland. Founded in Warsaw on February 22, 1925 by representatives of the 4 Polish hockey clubs: Polonia Warsaw, AZS Warszawa, Warszawianka Warszawa and Warszawskie Towarzystwo Łyżwiarskie (WTŁ Warszawa).

== National teams ==
=== Men ===
- Men's national ice hockey team
- Men's national under 20 ice hockey team
- Men's national under 18 ice hockey team

=== Women ===
- Women's national ice hockey team
- Women's national under 18 ice hockey team

== Teams (2016-17) ==
=== Polska Hokej Liga ===
- Polonia Bytom
- ComArch Cracovia
- Stoczniowiec Gdańsk
- JKH GKS Jastrzębie
- GKS Katowice
- Podhale Nowy Targ
- Orlik Opole
- Unia Oświęcim
- SMS I PZHL Sosnowiec
- Nesta Mires Toruń
- GKS Tychy

=== Polish 1. Liga ===
- Hokej Poznań
- Naprzód Janów
- SMS U18 Sosnowiec
- UKH Dębica
- Zagłębie Sosnowiec

=== Polish 2. Liga North ===
- KH Warsaw Capitals
- Malgips Dragons Gdańsk
- Oliwa Hockey Team
- ŁKH Łódź
- Mad Dogs Sopot
- BKS Bydgoszcz
- Hokej Poznań

=== Polish 2. Liga South ===
- WTH Wrocław
- Orlik II Opole
- STH Tychy Wolves
- KS Sigma Katowice
- KS Niespełnieni Oświęcim
- TMH Polonia II Bytom
- HK Zagłębie II Sosnowiec
- Gazda KH Podhale Nowy Targ

=== Polish 3. Liga ===
- PTH Poznań
- Mamuty Poznań
- KH Wilki Śrem
- Hockey Club Poznań
- WTH Września
- OKH Orły Oleśnica

=== Other teams ===
- PPWSZ Podhale (EUHL)
- KTH Krynica (temporarily inactive)
- Legia Warsawa (temporarily inactive)
- STS Sanok (temporarily inactive)

== Presidents of the Federation ==
- Wacław Znajdowski (1925–1928)
- Stanisław Polakiewicz (1928–1932)
- Leon Chrzanowski (1932–1935)
- Witold Hulanicki (1935–1937)
- Piotr Kurnicki (1937–1938)
- Stanisław Burhardt-Bukacki (1938–1939)
- Andrzej Osiecimski-Czapski (1945–1946)
- Mieczysław Boczar (1946–1951)
- Mieczysław Rudziński (1951–1953)
- Stefan Rzeszot (1953–1955)
- Michał Doroszewski (1955–1957)
- Tadeusz Wasilewski (1957–1968)
- Zdzisław Wierzbicki (1968–1973)
- Jan Kania (1973–1975)
- Wiesław Witczak (1975–1980)
- Eugeniusz Adamski (1980–1984)
- Jan Rodzoń (1984–1992)
- Bogdan Tyszkiewicz (1992–2000)
- Zenon Hajduga (2000–2008)
- Zdzisław Ingielewicz (2008–2012)
- Piotr Hałasik (2012–2014)
- Dawid Chwałka (2014 – )
