= Charles McIlvaine =

Charles McIlvaine may refer to:

- Charles Pettit McIlvaine (1799–1873), Episcopalian bishop in America
- Charles McIlvaine (mycologist) (1840–1909), American author and mycologist
- Charles McIlvaine (rower) (1906–1975), American rower
