= Melchiori =

Melchiori is a surname. Notable people with the surname include:

- Gerolamo Melchiori (died 1583), Italian Roman Catholic prelate
- Giorgio Melchiori (1920–2009), Italian literary critic and translator
- Julian Melchiori (born 1991), Canadian ice hockey player
- Mario Melchiori, Italian rower
