= Horst Hoeck =

German rower

Olympic medal record

Men's rowing
Gold medal – first place	1932 Los Angeles	Coxed four

Horst Hoeck (19 May 1904 – 12 April 1969) was a German rower who competed in the 1928 Summer Olympics and in the 1932 Summer Olympics.

In 1928 he and his partner Gerhard Voigt placed fourth after being eliminated in the quarter-finals of the double sculls event.

Four years later he won the gold medal as member of the German boat in the coxed fours competition.
