= Gaupset =

Gaupset is a Norwegian surname. Notable people with the surname include:

- Arne Gaupset (1894–1976), Norwegian sport wrestler
- Signe Gaupset (born 2005), Norwegian professional footballer
- Robert Gaupset (1906–1964), Norwegian wrestler
