= Bela Juhasz =

Bela Juhasz may refer to:

- Béla Juhász, Hungarian long-distance runner
- Bela Juhasz (wrestler), Yugoslav wrestler
