= Constant Pieterse =

Dutch rower (1895–1992)

Personal information
- Born: Constant Elisa Pieterse; 19 June 1895 Amsterdam, Netherlands
- Died: 27 March 1992 (aged 96) Zwolle, Netherlands

Sport
- Sport: Rowing
- Club: De Hoop, Amsterdam
Medal record
Men's rowing
Representing the Netherlands
European Rowing Championships
| Gold medal – first place | 1921 Amsterdam | Double scull |
| Gold medal – first place | 1925 Prague | Single scull |
| Bronze medal – third place | 1930 Liège | Double scull |

Constant Elisa Pieterse (19 June 1895 – 27 March 1992) was a Dutch rower. He competed at the 1924 Summer Olympics in Paris with the men's single sculls where he was eliminated in the round one repechage. He competed at the 1928 Summer Olympics in Amsterdam with the men's double sculls partnered with Han Cox where they were eliminated in the quarter-final.
