= Rowing at the 1924 Summer Olympics – Men's single sculls =

Olympic rowing event

Men's single sculls at the Games of the VIII Olympiad
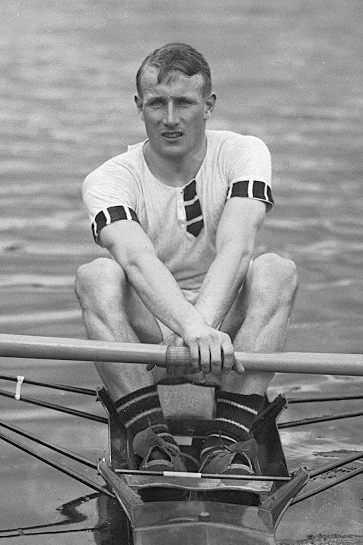
- Gold medalist Jack Beresford (1920)
- Venue: Seine
- Dates: 14–17 July 1924
- Competitors: 8 from 8 nations
- Winning time: 7:49.2

Medalists
1st place, gold medalist(s)		Jack Beresford; Great Britain
2nd place, silver medalist(s)		William Gilmore; United States
3rd place, bronze medalist(s)		Josef Schneider; Switzerland

The men's single sculls event was part of the rowing programme at the 1924 Summer Olympics. The competition, the sixth appearance of the event, was held from 14 to 17 July 1924 on the river Seine. There were 8 competitors from 8 nations, with each nation limited to a single boat. The event was won by Jack Beresford of Great Britain, the nation's third victory in the event (most among nations at that point). Beresford, who had lost a tightly contested final in 1920 to John B. Kelly Sr., became the first man to win multiple medals in the single sculls though it required him having to compete in the repechage to even secure a place in the final. Great Britain's podium streak in the event extended to four Games; the nation had won a medal each of the five times it appeared, missing only 1904.

American William Gilmore, who had beaten Beresford in the semifinals, finished second to the British rower in the final to take silver. Like Great Britain, the United States had reached the podium in each of its appearances in the event (this being its third). Josef Schneider of Switzerland earned bronze, the nation's first medal in the event.

== Background ==
This was the sixth appearance of the event. Rowing had been on the programme in 1896 but was cancelled due to bad weather. The single sculls has been held every time that rowing has been contested, beginning in 1900.

The only returning sculler from the 1920 Games was silver medalist Jack Beresford of Great Britain. He was the favorite in 1924, having won the 1920 and 1924 Diamond Challenge Sculls and being in the midst of seven consecutive Wingfield Sculls victories. His rival from 1920, gold medalist John B. Kelly Sr., competed only in the double sculls in 1924. The American boat at the Paris Games was instead rowed by William Gilmore, who had been quite successful since a 1919 debut. Gilmore, Canadian Arthur Belyea, and European champion Josef Schneider of Switzerland were significant challengers, though Belyea was hampered by neuritis in his hip.

Australia and Poland each made their debut in the event. Great Britain made its fifth appearance, most among nations, having missed only the 1904 Games in St. Louis.

== Competition format ==
The 1924 competition introduced the repechage, giving losing rowers a second chance at advancement. The tournament featured three rounds: semifinals, a repechage, and a final. There were three semifinals, each with 2 or 3 rowers, with the top finisher in each semifinal advancing directly to the final. The second-place rower in each semifinal competed in the repechage, while the third-place finishers in the semifinals with 3 rowers were eliminated. The repechage consisted of the three men who had finished second in their semifinals; the top sculler advanced to the final. The final featured four rowers. The course used the 2000 metres distance that became the Olympic standard in 1912.

== Schedule ==
Date	Time	Round
Monday, 14 July 1924		Semifinals; Repechage
Thursday, 17 July 1924		Final

== Results ==
=== Semifinals ===
==== Semifinal 1 ====
Rank	Rower	Nation	Time	Notes
1	Arthur Bull	Australia	7:19.0	Q
2	Marc Detton	France	7:19.2	R
3	Andrzej Osiecimski-Czapski	Poland	Unknown	

==== Semifinal 2 ====
Belyea finished one length behind Pieterse.

Rank	Rower	Nation	Time	Notes
1	Josef Schneider	Switzerland	7:15.6	Q
2	Constant Pieterse	Netherlands	7:17.8	R
3	Arthur Belyea	Canada	Unknown	

==== Semifinal 3 ====
Rank	Rower	Nation	Time	Notes
1	William Gilmore	United States	7:03.2	Q
2	Jack Beresford	Great Britain	7:07.4	R

=== Repechage ===
Rank	Rower	Nation	Time	Notes
1	Jack Beresford	Great Britain	8:00.4	Q
2	Constant Pieterse	Netherlands	8:09.4	
3	Marc Detton	France	DNF	

=== Final ===
Rank	Rower	Nation	Time
1st place, gold medalist(s)	Jack Beresford	Great Britain	7:49.2
2nd place, silver medalist(s)	William Gilmore	United States	7:54.0
3rd place, bronze medalist(s)	Josef Schneider	Switzerland	8:01.1
4	Arthur Bull	Australia	DNF

== Results summary ==
Rank	Rower	Nation	Semifinals	Repechage	Final
1st place, gold medalist(s)	Jack Beresford	Great Britain	7:07.4	8:00.4	7:49.2
2nd place, silver medalist(s)	William Gilmore	United States	7:03.2	Bye	7:54.0
3rd place, bronze medalist(s)	Josef Schneider	Switzerland	7:15.6	Bye	8:01.1
4	Ted Bull	Australia	7:19.0	Bye	DNF
5	Constant Pieterse	Netherlands	7:17.8	8:09.4	Did not advance
6	Marc Detton	France	7:19.2	DNF	Did not advance
7	Andrzej Osiecimski-Czapski	Poland	Unknown	Did not advance	
7	Arthur Belyea	Canada	Unknown	Did not advance	

== Sources ==
- Wudarski, Pawel (1999). "Wyniki Igrzysk Olimpijskich" (in Polish).
