= Ervin Mórich =

Hungarian rower

Personal information
- Nationality: Hungarian
- Born: 27 May 1897; Berlin, Germany
- Died: 1982 (aged 84–85)

Sport
- Sport: Rowing

Ervin Mórich (27 May 1897 – 1982) was a Hungarian rower. He competed in the men's double sculls event at the 1924 Summer Olympics.
