= Ejnar Hansen =

Danish wrestler (1898–1947)

Personal information
- Nationality: Danish
- Born: 20 December 1898 Guldborgsund, Denmark
- Died: 26 March 1947 (aged 48) Copenhagen, Denmark

Sport
- Sport: Wrestling

Ejnar Hansen (20 December 1898 – 26 March 1947) was a Danish wrestler. He competed in the men's Greco-Roman light heavyweight at the 1928 Summer Olympics.

Einar Hansen then achieved the best result of his career at the 1930 European Championship in Stockholm. There he defeated the German champion Willi Müller and Alfred Teaearu from Estonia and only lost to Carl Westergren from Sweden. These results brought him 2nd place and winning the silver medal in a light heavyweight.
