= Johan Heijm =

Dutch wrestler

Personal information
- Nationality: Dutch
- Born: 16 November 1904 Amsterdam, Netherlands
- Died: 13 March 1990 (aged 85) Amsterdam, Netherlands

Sport
- Sport: Wrestling

Johan Heijm (16 November 1904 – 13 March 1990) was a Dutch wrestler. He competed in the men's Greco-Roman light heavyweight at the 1928 Summer Olympics.
