= Otto Pohla =

Estonian wrestler (1899–1941)

Personal information
- Nationality: Estonian
- Born: 20 March 1899 Hageri, Estonia
- Died: July 1941 Gulf of Finland

Sport
- Sport: Wrestling

Otto Pohla (20 March 1899 – July 1941) was an Estonian wrestler. He competed in the men's Greco-Roman light heavyweight at the 1928 Summer Olympics. He was killed during World War II when the ship he was on was sunk by German submarines.

== Personal life ==
Pohla worked as a plumber. After the commencement of Operation Barbarossa, he was mobilized into the Red Army and trained in Tallinn. Whilst sailing to Leningrad for deployment, Pohla and several hundred other soldiers died when the transport ship carrying them was sunk by German submarines. Pohla and the other recruits were listed as missing in action until they were declared dead in January 1943.
