= Jan Gałuszka =

Polish wrestler

Personal information
- Nationality: Polish
- Born: 2 June 1903 Gleiwitz, German Empire
- Died: 1981 (aged 77–78) Germany

Sport
- Sport: Wrestling

Jan Gałuszka (2 June 1903 – 1981) was a Polish wrestler. He competed in the men's Greco-Roman light heavyweight at the 1928 Summer Olympics.
