= Marc Detton =

French rower

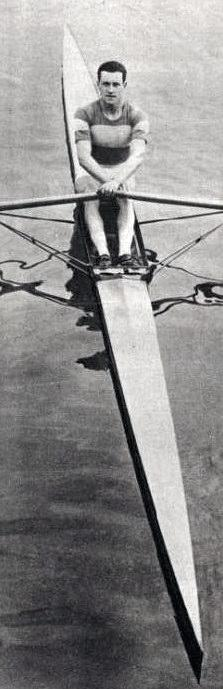
- Marc Detton in 1924

Personal information
- Born: Marc Pierre Detton; 20 February 1901 Thorigny-sur-Marne, France
- Died: 24 January 1977 (aged 75) Paris, France

Sport
- Sport: Rowing
- Club: Société d'Encouragement du Sport Nautique, Nogent-sur-Marne
Medal record
Men's rowing
Representing France
Olympic Games
Silver medal – second place	1924 Paris	Double sculls
European Rowing Championships
Bronze medal – third place	1922 Barcelona	Single sculls
Silver medal – second place	1924 Zürich	Single sculls
Gold medal – first place	1925 Prague	Double sculls

Marc Pierre Detton (20 February 1901 – 24 January 1977) was a French rower who competed in the 1924 Summer Olympics.

In 1924 he won the silver medal with his partner Jean-Pierre Stock in the double sculls event. He also participated in the single sculls, but was eliminated in the repechage.
