= Gustave Colpaert =

Belgian wrestler

Georges Colpaert
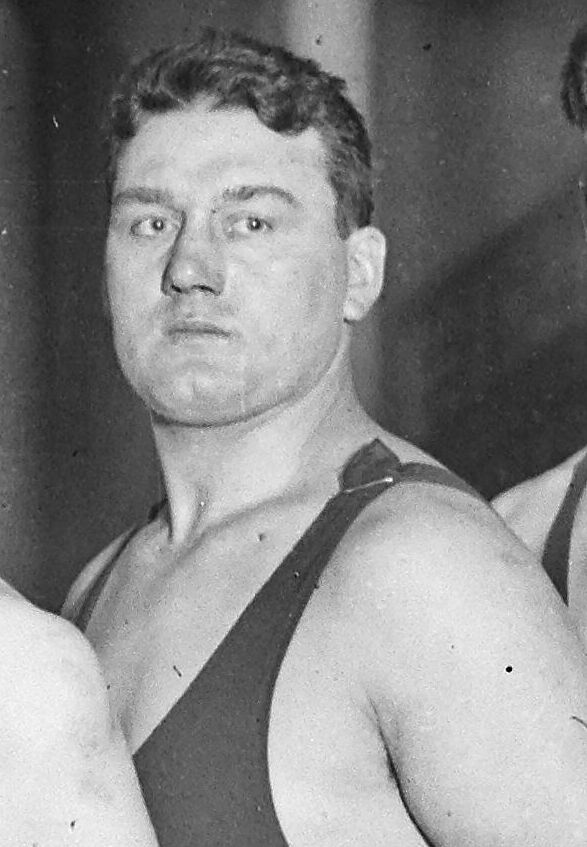
- Gustave Colpaert in 1928

Personal information
- Nationality: Belgian

Sport
- Sport: Wrestling

Georges Colpaert was a Belgian wrestler. He competed in the men's Greco-Roman heavyweight at the 1928 Summer Olympics.
