= Humphrey Boardman =

English rower (1904–1998)

Personal information
- Nationality: British (English)
- Born: 26 July 1904 Norwich, England
- Died: 15 June 1998 (aged 93) Norwich, England

Sport
- Sport: Rowing
- Event(s): Coxless Four, eight
- Club: London RC
Medal record
Men's rowing
Representing England
British Empire Games
Gold medal – first place	1930 Hamilton	Coxed fours
Gold medal – first place	1930 Hamilton	Eights

Humphrey Colman Boardman (26 July 1904 – 15 June 1998) was an English rower who competed for Great Britain at the 1928 Summer Olympics at Amsterdam.

== Biography ==
He was born in Norwich, England and was the younger brother of Christopher Boardman who won gold in the Sailing at the 1936 Summer Olympics. Their father, Edward Thomas Boardman, was a Norwich architect, as was, their grandfather Edward Boardman. Their mother, Florence, was the daughter of Jeremiah Colman (MP) owner of Colman's Mustard.

In the 1928 Summer Olympics he and his partner Denis Guye participated in the double sculls event. They qualified for the second round repêchage but did not start in this race.

He competed for the 1930 English team, winning gold medals in the eights and fours event at the 1930 British Empire Games in Hamilton, Ontario, Canada.
