= Carlos Branco =

Brazilian rower (1898–1972)

Personal information
- Full name: Carlos Castelo Branco
- Born: 16 April 1898 Rio de Janeiro, Brazil
- Died: 24 September 1972 (aged 74)

Sport
- Sport: Rowing

Carlos Castelo Branco (16 April 1898 – 24 September 1972) was a Brazilian rower. He competed in the men's double sculls event at the 1924 Summer Olympics. He also competed in the water polo tournament at the 1932 Summer Olympics.
