= Jean-Pierre Stock =

French rower (1900–1950)

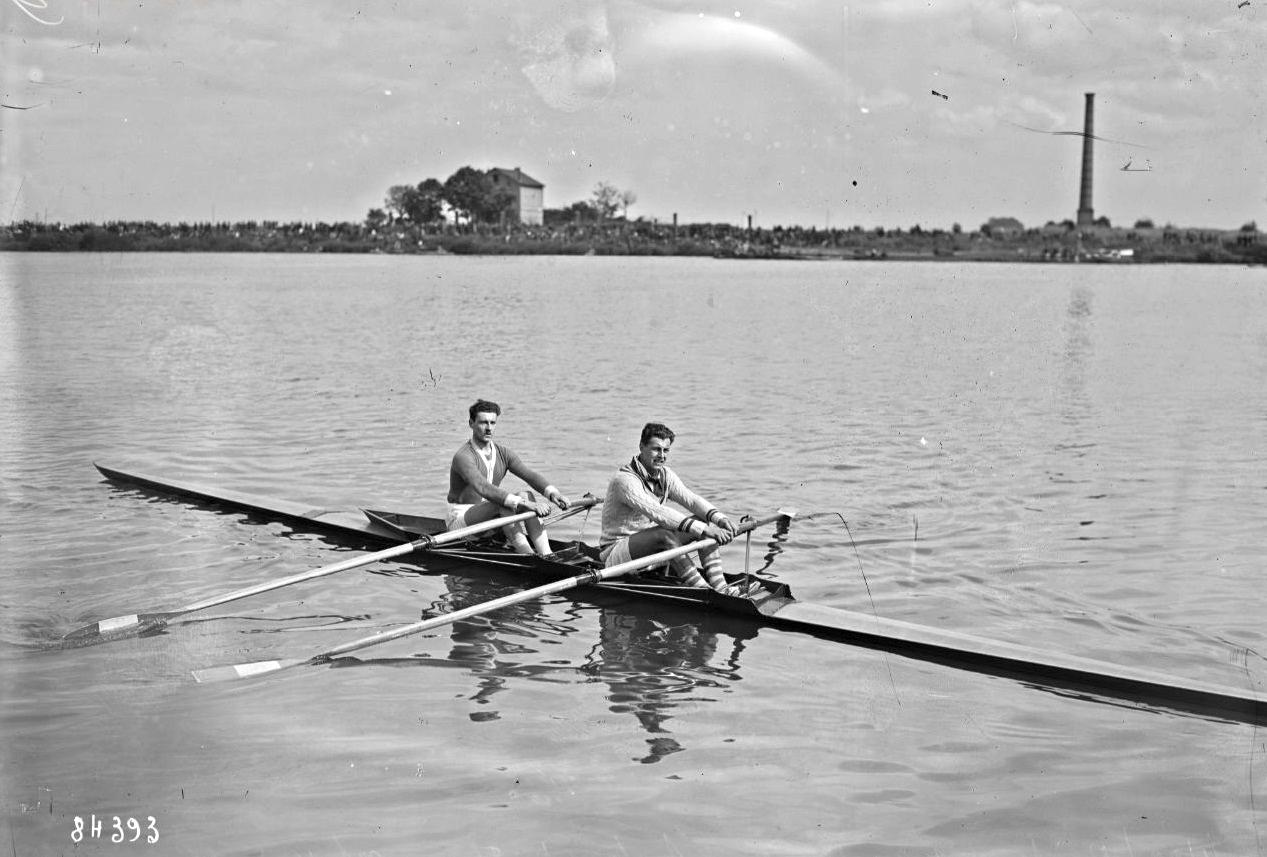
- Detton (left) and Stock (right) in 1923

Personal information
- Born: 5 April 1900 Paris, France
- Died: 2 October 1950 (aged 50) Caracas, Venezuela

Sport
- Sport: Rowing
- Club: Société d'Encouragement du Sport Nautique, Nogent-sur-Marne
Medal record
Men's rowing
Representing France
Olympic Games
Silver medal – second place	1924 Paris	Double sculls
European Rowing Championships
Gold medal – first place	1925 Prague	Double sculls

Jean-Pierre Stock (5 April 1900 – 2 October 1950) was a French rower who competed in the 1924 Summer Olympics. In 1924 he won the silver medal with his partner Marc Detton in the double sculls event at the age of 24.
