= Simon de Lanfranchi =

French wrestler

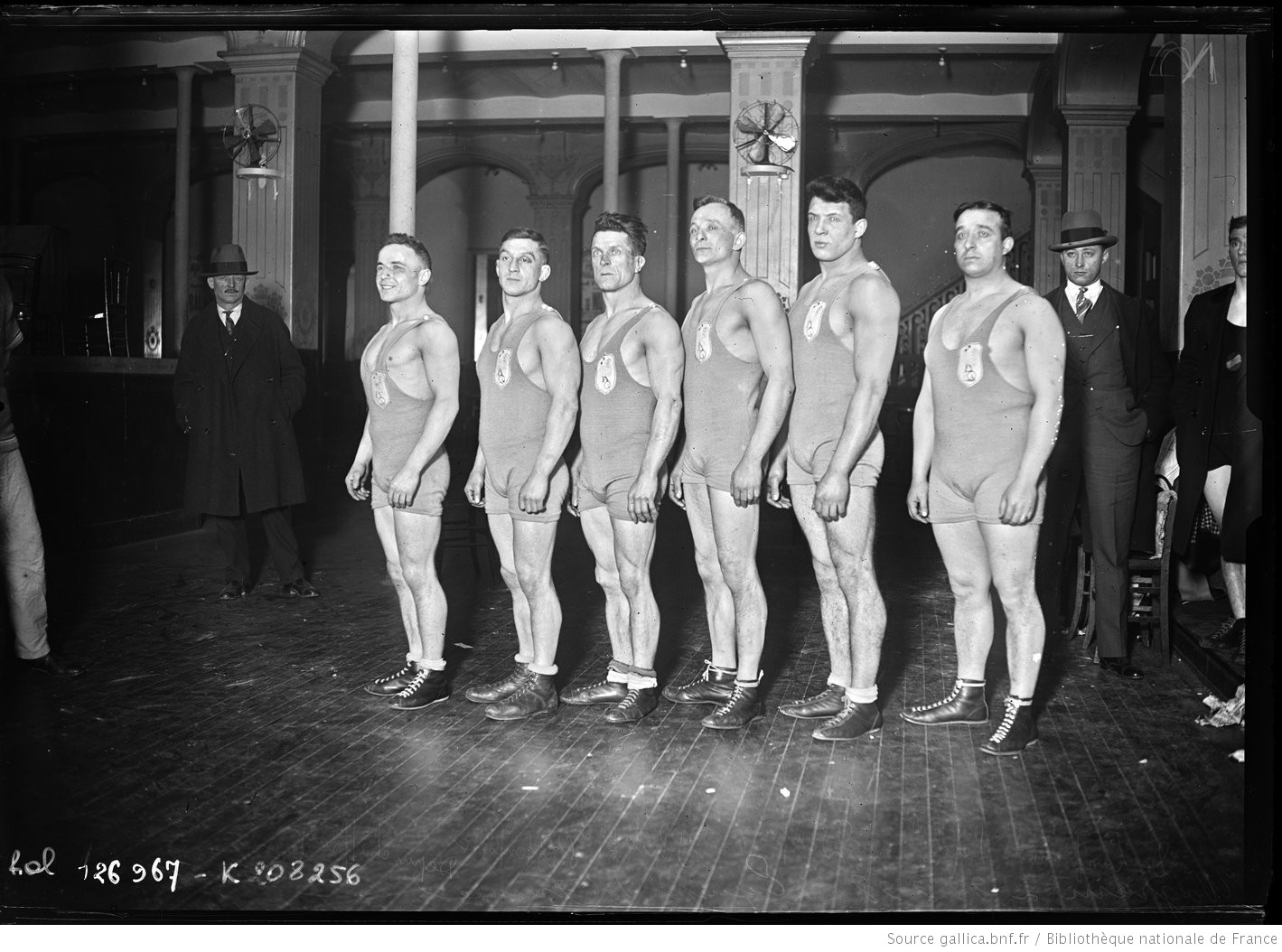

Personal information
- Nationality: French
- Born: 23 December 1898 Levie, France

Sport
- Sport: Wrestling

Simon de Lanfranchi (born 23 December 1898) was a French wrestler. He competed in the men's Greco-Roman heavyweight at the 1928 Summer Olympics.
