= Maurice Caplain =

French rower

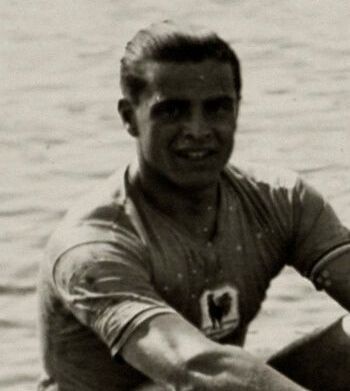

Personal information
- Nationality: French

Sport
- Sport: Rowing

Maurice Caplain was a French rower. He competed in the men's double sculls event at the 1928 Summer Olympics. Caplain is deceased.
