= Artūrs Motmillers =

Latvian long-distance runner

Personal information
- Full name: Artūrs Otomārs Motmillers
- Nationality: Latvian
- Born: 1 October 1900 Riga, Russian Empire (now Latvia)
- Died: 18 August 1980 (aged 79) Riga, Latvian SSR, Soviet Union

Sport
- Sport: Long-distance running
- Event: Marathon

Artūrs Otomārs Motmillers (1 October 1900 – 18 August 1980) was a Latvian long-distance runner. He competed at the 1924, 1928 and the 1936 Summer Olympics.

Motmillers was the winner of the 12th Košice Peace Marathon in 1935, the 1937 Quer durch Berlin race and an eight-time Latvian champion in various lengths. He also broke the national record 13 times, with his marathon time set in 1933 (2.41:38,2) remaining unbeaten for 19 years.

During World War II he gave refuge to seven persecuted Jews. After the war he was deported to the Russian SFSR by the Soviet regime, but later returned to Latvia. He died in 1980.
