= Heini Thoma =

Swiss rower

Personal information
- Born: Heinrich Thoma; 16 October 1900
- Died: 16 October 1982 (aged 82)

Sport
- Sport: Rowing
- Club: Grasshopper Club Zürich
Medal record
Men's rowing
Representing Switzerland
Olympic Games
Bronze medal – third place	1924 Paris	Double sculls
European Rowing Championships
Gold medal – first place	1921 Amsterdam	Eight
Gold medal – first place	1923 Como	Double sculls
Gold medal – first place	1924 Zürich	Double sculls

Heinrich Thoma (16 October 1900 – 16 October 1982) was a Swiss rower who competed in the 1924 Summer Olympics. In 1924 he won the bronze medal with his partner Rudolf Bosshard in the double scull event.
