= Denis Guye =

British rower (1901–1986)

Denis Germain Fritz Guye (20 August 1901 – 16 September 1986) was an English rower who competed for Great Britain at the 1928 Summer Olympics at Amsterdam and won the Wingfield Sculls three times.

Guye was born in Brentford, the son of Fritz Guye and his wife Gertrude Percy Ashton Glover. His father was a Swiss watchmaker who had settled in London. Guye was primarily a sculler and first competed in the Wingfield Sculls in 1927, losing to David Collet. He was selected for the 1928 Summer Olympics and partnered Humphrey Boardman in the double sculls event. They qualified for the second round repêchage but did not start in this race.

Guye lost to Collet in the Wingfield Sculls in 1928 and 1929, but beat him in 1930. He won again in 1931 and 1932, but lost in 1933 to Dick Southwood.

Guye's elder brother Edward Guye emigrated to Australia where he became a politician in Victoria.
