= Paul Costello =

American Olympic rower (1894–1986)

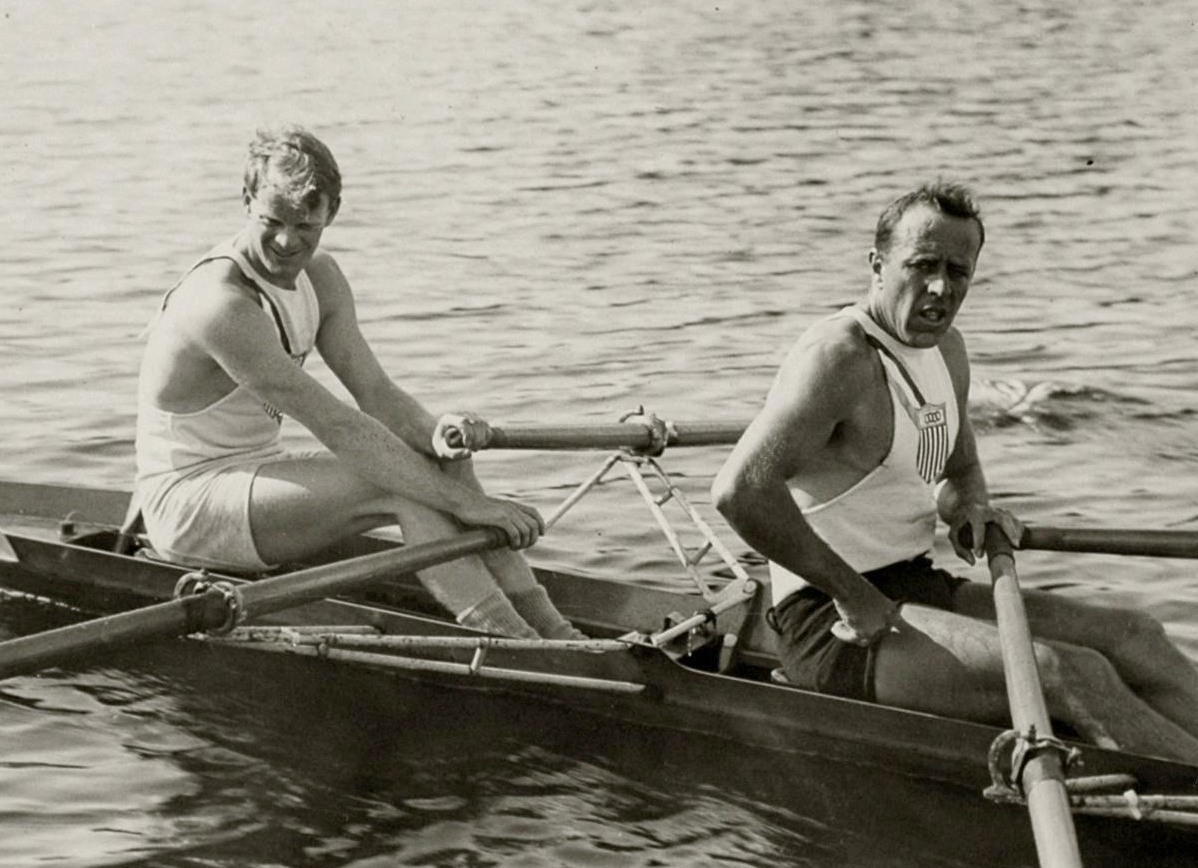
- McIlvaine and Costello (right) at the 1928 Olympics

Personal information
- Full name: Paul Vincent Costello
- Born: December 27, 1894 Philadelphia, Pennsylvania, U.S.
- Died: April 17, 1986 (aged 91) Philadelphia, Pennsylvania, U.S.
- Height: 1.78 m (5 ft 10 in)
- Weight: 73 kg (161 lb)

Sport
- Sport: Rowing
- Club: Penn AC, Philadelphia
Medal record
Representing the United States
Olympic Games
Gold medal – first place	1920 Antwerp	Double sculls
Gold medal – first place	1924 Paris	Double sculls
Gold medal – first place	1928 Amsterdam	Double sculls
Gold Cup Challenge
Gold medal – first place	1924 Philadelphia	Single sculls

Paul Vincent Costello (December 27, 1894 – April 17, 1986) was an American triple Olympic gold medal winner in rowing. He was the first rower to win a gold medal in the same event, double sculls, at three consecutive Olympics. He also won numerous national titles in both the single and double scull in the 1920s.

Costello won the double sculls race with his cousin John B. Kelly Sr., also known as Jack Kelly at the 1920 Olympics in Antwerp, Belgium, and the 1924 Olympics in Paris, France. Costello repeated his winning ways at the 1928 Olympics in Amsterdam, Netherlands, with new partner Charles McIlvaine.

Historically, Costello has been overshadowed somewhat by Kelly who was also a triple Olympic gold medalist, having won both the single and double scull at the 1920 games, along with the double sculls at the 1924 games. Kelly gained additional fame as the father of both Grace Kelly, actress and Princess of Monaco, and John B. Kelly Jr., an accomplished oarsman in his own right. Costello and Kelly both rowed for the Vesper Boat Club of Philadelphia.

== Achievements and awards ==
- Gold Medal, Double Scull, 1920 Olympic Games
- Gold Medal, Double Scull, 1924 Olympic Games
- Gold Medal, Double Scull, 1928 Olympic Games
- Member, United States Rowing Hall of Fame, Double Scull, (elected 1956)

== Sources ==
- Hickok Sports
