= Adriano Tuzi =

Italian rower

Personal information
- Nationality: Italian
- Born: 8 February 1906 Rome, Italy

Sport
- Sport: Rowing

Adriano Tuzi (born 8 February 1906, date of death unknown) was an Italian rower. He competed in the men's double sculls event at the 1928 Summer Olympics.
