= Joseph Wright Jr. (rower) =

Canadian rower

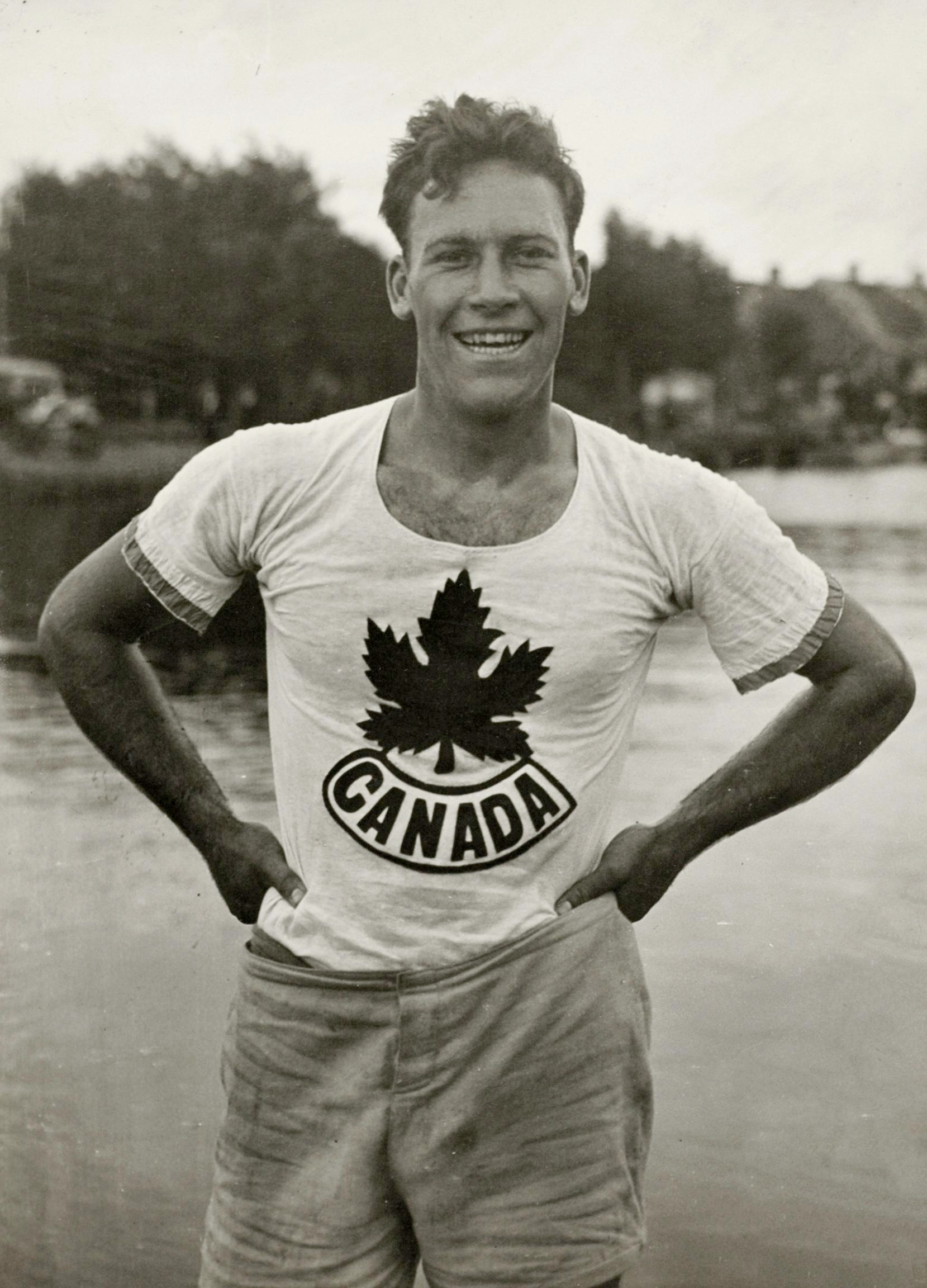
- Joseph Wright at the 1928 Olympics

Personal information
- Full name: Joseph George Harris Wright Jr.
- Born: March 28, 1906 Toronto, Ontario, Canada
- Died: June 7, 1981 (aged 75) Toronto, Ontario, Canada
- Relatives: Joseph Wright Sr. (father)

Sport
- Sport: Rowing
- Club: Argonaut Rowing Club, Toronto
Medal record
Representing Canada
Olympic Games
Silver medal – second place	1928 Amsterdam	Double sculls

Joseph George Harris Wright Jr. (March 28, 1906 – June 7, 1981) was a Canadian rower who competed in the 1928 Summer Olympics and in the 1932 Summer Olympics. He was inducted into Canada's Sports Hall of Fame in 1955. Joe Wright Jr,. and his father, Joe Wright Sr., are among the most decorated and celebrated members of the Argonaut Rowing Club all time.

In 1928 he became Canadian (CAAO) and US (NAAO) single sculls champion and only the second Canadian to win the coveted Diamond Challenge Sculls at the Annual Henley Royal Regatta. He won the Olympic silver medal with his partner Jack Guest in the double sculls competition. He also competed in the single sculls event and finished fifth after being eliminated in the quarter-finals.

Four years later he was the only rower who did not reach the final in the single sculls competition. His athletic career included playing football for the Toronto Argonauts football club (founded in 1873 by the Argonaut Rowing Club), he played centre (snap) from 1924 to 1936 and won the Grey Cup in 1933.

He was coached by his father Joseph Wright Sr., who won a silver medal at the 1904 Summer Olympics as a member of a Canadian eights crew.
