= Achille Mengé =

Belgian rower (1900–1966)

Personal information
- Full name: Achille François Irénée Mengé
- Born: 6 December 1900 Bruges, Belgium
- Died: 5 April 1966 (aged 65) Bruges, Belgium

Sport
- Sport: Rowing
- Club: KRB, Brugge
Medal record
Men's rowing
Representing Belgium
European Rowing Championships
Bronze medal – third place	1929 Bydgoszcz	Single sculls

Achille Mengé (6 December 1900 – 5 April 1966) was a Belgian rower. He competed at the 1928 Summer Olympics in Amsterdam with the men's double sculls where they were eliminated in the round one repechage.
