= Edmundo Branco =

Brazilian rower (1900–??)

Personal information
- Full name: Edmundo Castelo Branco
- Born: 15 March 1900 Rio de Janeiro, Brazil

Sport
- Sport: Rowing

Edmundo Castelo Branco (born 15 March 1900, date of death unknown) was a Brazilian rower. He competed in the men's double sculls event at the 1924 Summer Olympics.
