= Arthur Belyea =

Canadian rower

Personal information
- Born: 31 August 1885; Saint John, New Brunswick, Canada
- Died: 6 January 1968 (aged 82); Albany, New York, United States

Sport
- Sport: Rowing

Arthur Belyea (31 August 1885 – 6 January 1968) was a Canadian rower. He competed in the men's single sculls event at the 1924 Summer Olympics.
