= Rowing at the 1928 Summer Olympics – Men's double sculls =

Men's double sculls at the Games of the IX Olympiad
- Venue: Sloten
- Competitors: 20 from 10 nations

Medalists
1st place, gold medalist(s)		United States; Paul Costello, Charles McIlvaine
2nd place, silver medalist(s)		Canada; Joseph Wright, Jack Guest
3rd place, bronze medalist(s)		Austria; Leo Losert, Viktor Flessl

The men's double sculls event was part of the rowing programme at the 1928 Summer Olympics. It was one of seven rowing events for men and was the fourth appearance of the event.

== Results ==
Source: Official results; De Wael

=== Round 1 ===
Winners advanced to the second round. Losers competed in the first repechage.

Heat 1
Rank	Rowers	Nation	Time	Qual.
1	Horst Hoeck, Gerhard Voigt	Germany	8:02.2	Q2
2	André Houpelyne, Achille Mengé	Belgium	8:05.6	R1

Heat 2
Rank	Rowers	Nation	Time	Qual.
1	Paul Costello, Charles McIlvaine	United States	7:46.8	Q2
2	Rudolf Bosshard, Maurice Rieder	Switzerland	8:02.0	R1

Heat 3
Rank	Rowers	Nation	Time	Qual.
1	Joseph Wright, Jack Guest	Canada	7:48.2	Q2
2	Han Cox, Constant Pieterse	Netherlands	7:54.8	R1

Heat 4
Rank	Rowers	Nation	Time	Qual.
1	Leo Losert, Viktor Flessl	Austria	7:55.8	Q2
2	Humphrey Boardman, Denis Guye	Great Britain	8:00.8	R1

Heat 5
Rank	Rowers	Nation	Time	Qual.
1	Paul Robineau, Maurice Caplain	France	8:03.6	Q2
2	Adriano Tuzi, Mario Melchiori	Italy	8:10.4	R1

==== Repechage 1 ====
Winners advanced to the second round, but were ineligible for a second repechage if they lost there. Losers were eliminated.

Heat 1
Rank	Rowers	Nation	Time	Qual.
1	Han Cox, Constant Pieterse	Netherlands	7:59.8	Q2
2	Adriano Tuzi, Mario Melchiori	Italy	8:10.4	elim.

Heat 2
Rank	Rowers	Nation	Time	Qual.
1	Humphrey Boardman, Denis Guye	Great Britain	7:55.8	Q2
2	André Houpelyne, Achille Mengé	Belgium	7:56.6	elim.

Heat 3
Rank	Rowers	Nation	Time	Qual.
1	Rudolf Bosshard, Maurice Rieder	Switzerland	7:52.8	Q2

=== Round 2 ===
Winners advanced to the third round. Losers competed in the second repechage, if they had advanced by winning in the first round, or were eliminated if they had advanced through the first repechage.

Heat 1
Rank	Rowers	Nation	Time	Qual.
1	Rudolf Bosshard, Maurice Rieder	Switzerland	6:55.8	Q3
2	Paul Robineau, Maurice Caplain	France	7:01.4	R2

Heat 2
Rank	Rowers	Nation	Time	Qual.
1	Paul Costello, Charles McIlvaine	United States	6:48.4	Q3
2	Leo Losert, Viktor Flessl	Austria	6:55.6	R2

Heat 3
Rank	Rowers	Nation	Time	Qual.
1	Horst Hoeck, Gerhard Voigt	Germany	6:54.4	Q3
2	Joseph Wright, Jack Guest	Canada	6:58.6	R2

Heat 4
Rank	Rowers	Nation	Time	Qual.
1	Han Cox, Constant Pieterse	Netherlands	6:55.8	Q3
2	Humphrey Boardman, Denis Guye	Great Britain	6:59.2	elim.

==== Repechage 2 ====
Winners advanced to the third round, while losers were eliminated.

Heat 1
Rank	Rowers	Nation	Time	Qual.
1	Joseph Wright, Jack Guest	Canada	7:21.8	Q3
2	Paul Robineau, Maurice Caplain	France	7:30.8	elim.

Heat 2
Rank	Rowers	Nation	Time	Qual.
1	Leo Losert, Viktor Flessl	Austria	7:32.6	Q3

=== Round 3 ===
The competition became single-elimination from this point, with losers being eliminated even if they had not previously had to advance through a repechage.

Heat 1
Rank	Rowers	Nation	Time	Qual.
1	Paul Costello, Charles McIlvaine	United States	6:43.8	Q
2	Rudolf Bosshard, Maurice Rieder	Switzerland	6:53.4	elim.

Heat 2
Rank	Rowers	Nation	Time	Qual.
1	Joseph Wright, Jack Guest	Canada	6:42.2	Q
2	Horst Hoeck, Gerhard Voigt	Germany	6:48.2	elim.

Heat 3
Rank	Rowers	Nation	Time	Qual.
1	Leo Losert, Viktor Flessl	Austria	6:46.4	Q
2	Han Cox, Constant Pieterse	Netherlands	6:52.8	elim.

=== Semifinals ===
Canada had a bye and advanced to the gold medal final along with the winner of the only semifinal (the United States), with the loser (Austria) taking bronze.

Heat 1
Rank	Rowers	Nation	Time	Qual.
1	Joseph Wright, Jack Guest	Canada	6:58.0	Q

Heat 2
Rank	Rowers	Nation	Time	Qual.
1	Paul Costello, Charles McIlvaine	United States	6:45.2	Q
2 ( (bronze) )	Leo Losert, Viktor Flessl	Austria	6:48.8	

=== Finals ===
Gold medal final
Rank	Rowers	Nation	Time
1st place, gold medalist(s)	Paul Costello, Charles McIlvaine	United States	6:41.4
2nd place, silver medalist(s)	Joseph Wright, Jack Guest	Canada	6:51.0
