= William Gilmore (rower) =

American rower (1895–1969)

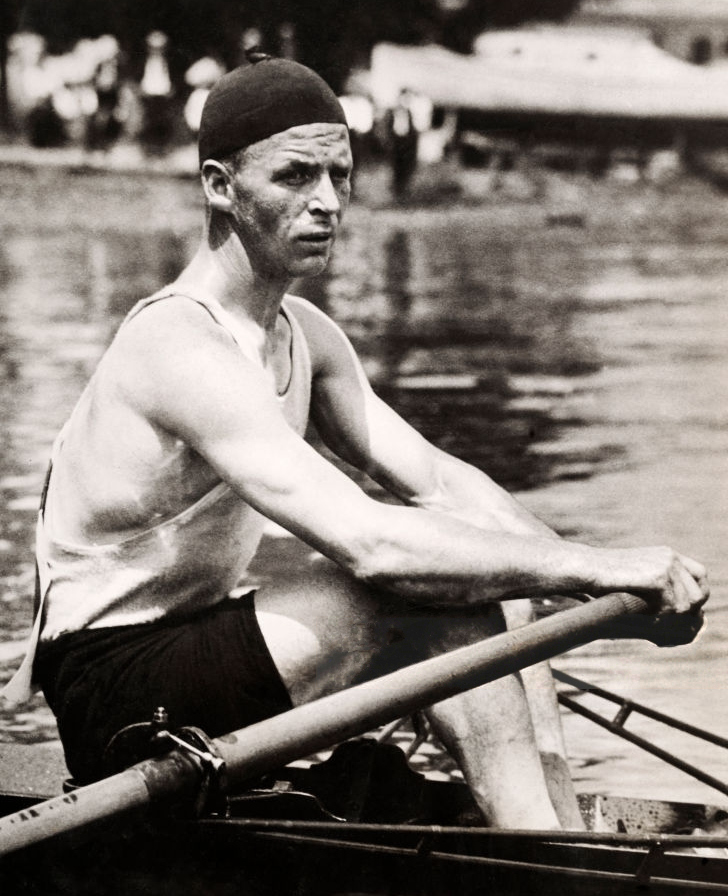
- Gilmore in 1923

Personal information
- Born: February 16, 1895 Wayne, Pennsylvania, U.S.
- Died: December 5, 1969 (aged 74) Philadelphia, Pennsylvania, U.S.

Sport
- Sport: Rowing
- Club: Bachelors Barge Club, Philadelphia
Medal record
Representing the United States
Olympic Games
Gold medal – first place	1932 Los Angeles	Double sculls
Silver medal – second place	1924 Paris	Single sculls

William Evans Garrett Gilmore (February 16, 1895 – December 5, 1969), sometimes known as Garrett Gilmore, was an American rower. He won a silver medal in the single sculls at the 1924 Summer Olympics and a gold in double sculls at the 1932 Games.

Gilmore served in the U.S. Army during World War I. He took up rowing in 1919 at the Bachelors Barge Club in Philadelphia. Next year he won his first junior national title. He later collected five national senior titles in the single sculls and several more in the doubles. After retiring from competitions Gilmore worked as a real estate broker.

He died on December 5, 1969, and was interred at Laurel Hill Cemetery in Philadelphia.
