= Jack Guest =

Canadian rower

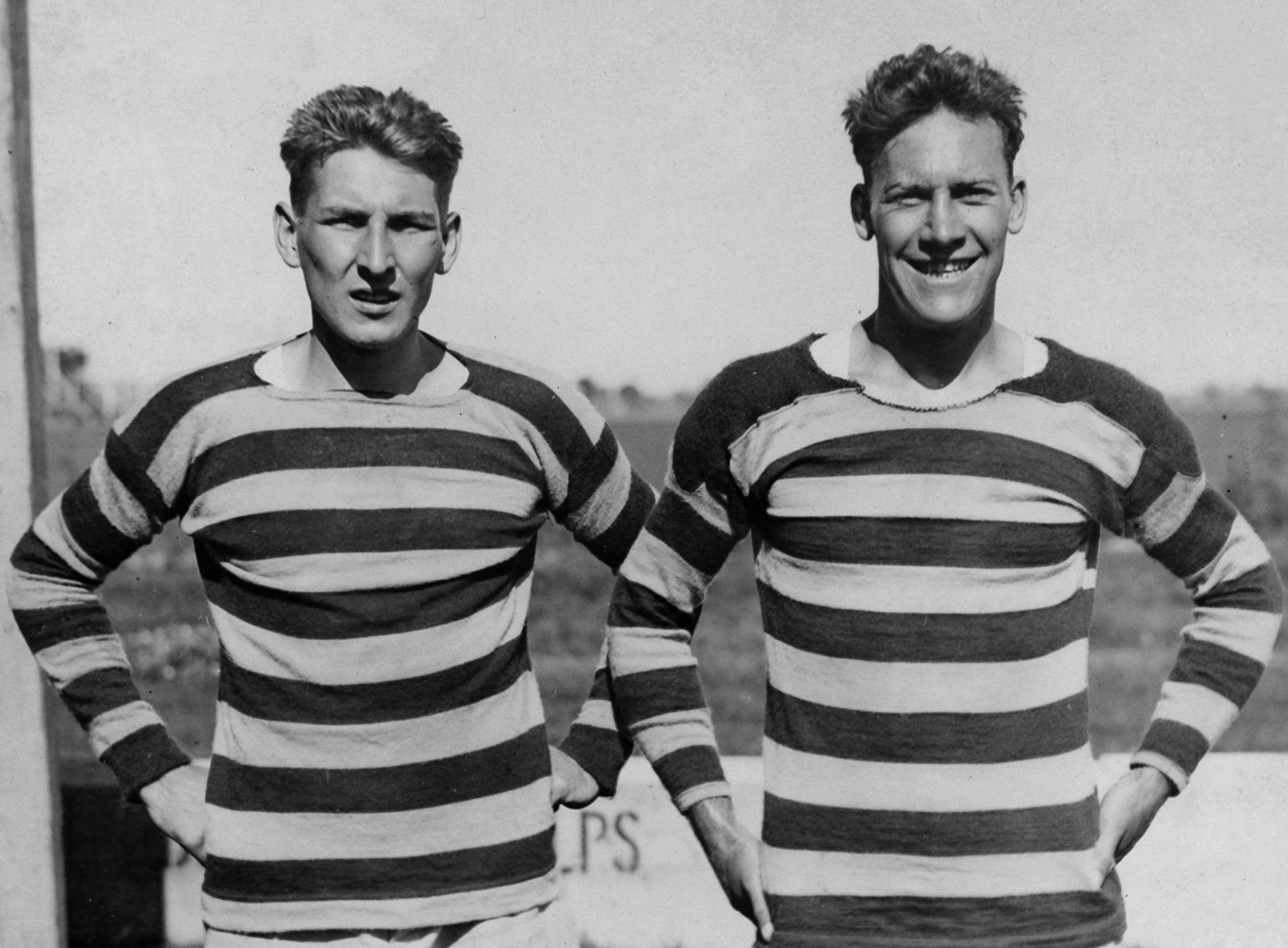
- Jack Guest and Joseph Wright at the 1928 Olympics

Personal information
- Born: 28 March 1906 Montreal, Quebec, Canada
- Died: 12 June 1972 (aged 66) Toronto, Ontario, Canada

Sport
- Sport: Rowing
- Club: Argonaut Rowing Club, Toronto
Medal record
Men's rowing
Representing Canada
Olympic Games
Silver medal – second place	1928 Amsterdam	Double sculls

John Schofield Guest (28 March 1906 – 12 June 1972) was a Canadian rower who won a silver medal in the double sculls at the 1928 Summer Olympics, together with Joseph Wright Jr.

Guest started rowing in 1924, and in 1928 already competed in the Diamond Challenge Sculls, which was then an unofficial world championship. He lost in the semifinals to Wright, and became his double scull partner at the Summer Olympics. Next year Guest won a national title in the single sculls, but lost again to Wright in the semifinal of Diamond Sculls. Guest won the Diamond Sculls in 1930.

Guest retired from rowing in 1930 and worked as a rowing administrator, particularly as the president of the Don Rowing Club of Mississauga from 1938 to 1952. He led the Canadian rowing team at the 1956 Olympics and the 1962 and 1966 British Empire and Commonwealth Games, and became the first Canadian member of the International Federation of Rowing Associations. Between 1960 and 1968 he headed the Canadian Olympic Committee.

In 1955 Guest was inducted to Canada's Sports Hall of Fame. He is honoured by the Jack Guest award, which is given annually to the best Canadian junior single-scull rower. His son, Jack Guest Jr., also competed internationally in rowing; he was selected for the 1952 Olympics but had to withdraw due to injury.
