= Arthur von Pongracz =

Austrian sportsman

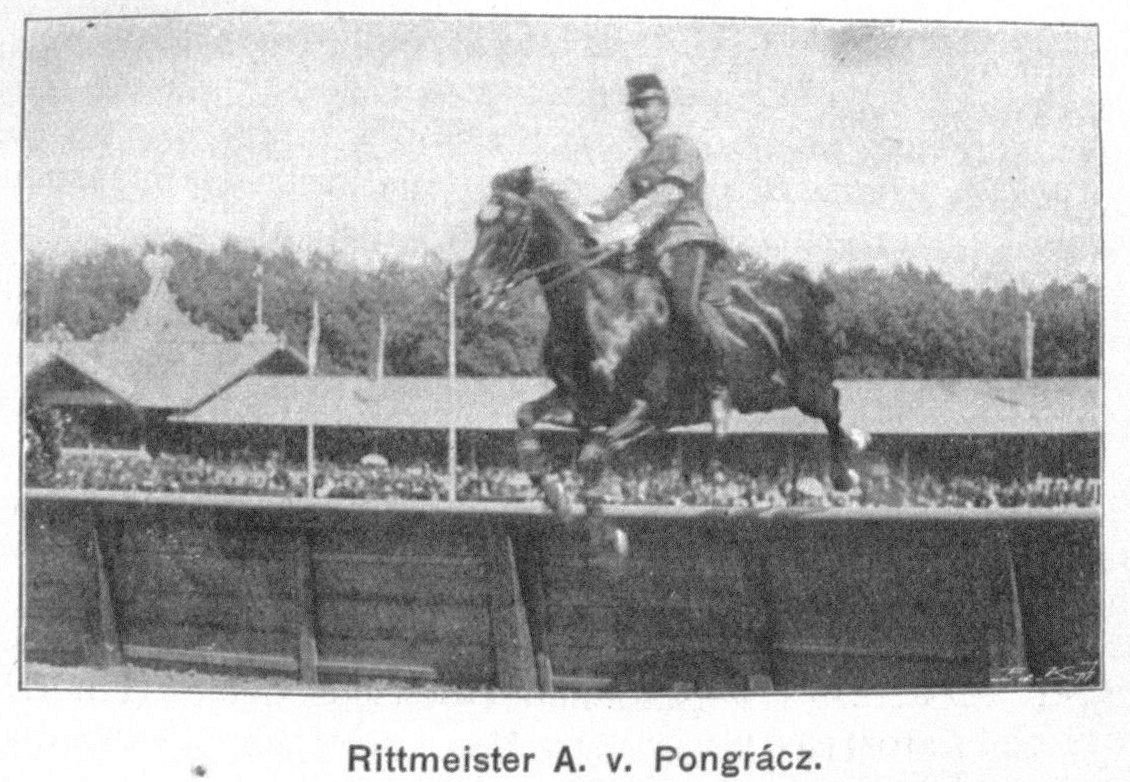
Arthur von Pongracz in 1901

Arthur von Pongrácz de Szent-Miklós und Óvár, Hungarian: szentmiklósi és óvári (gróf, báró, ill. nemes) Pongrácz Artúr (25 June 1864 – 13 January 1942) was an Austrian equestrian rider. He competed in Dressage at the 1924, 1928, and 1936 Summer Olympics, with his best performance being 4th place in Men's Team Dressage in 1936 and 6th place in Men's Individual Dressage in 1928. He was also the second oldest athlete ever to compete at the Olympics (in the non-art disciplines), after Oscar Swahn.
