= Rowing at the 1924 Summer Olympics – Men's double sculls =

Men's double sculls at the Games of the VIII Olympiad
- Venue: Seine
- Dates: 15–17 July 1924
- Competitors: 10 from 5 nations

Medalists
1st place, gold medalist(s)		Paul Costello, John B. Kelly Sr. United States
2nd place, silver medalist(s)		Marc Detton, Jean-Pierre Stock; France
3rd place, bronze medalist(s)		Rudolf Bosshard, Heini Thoma; Switzerland

The men's double sculls event was part of the rowing programme at the 1924 Summer Olympics. The competition, the third appearance of the event, was held from 15 to 17 July 1924 on the river Seine.

Five pairs, each from a different nation, competed.

== Results ==
=== Semifinals ===
The top two boats in each semifinal qualified for the final; only one team of five was eliminated.

Semifinal 1
Place	Rowers	Time	Qual.
1	Paul Costello (USA); John B. Kelly Sr. (USA)	6:34.0	Q
2	Marc Detton (FRA); Jean-Pierre Stock (FRA)		Q
3	Ervin Mórich (HUN); Béla Szendey (HUN)		
Semifinal 2
Place	Rowers	Time	Qual.
1	Rudolf Bosshard (SUI); Heini Thoma (SUI)	6:55.0	Q
2	Carlos Branco (BRA); Edmundo Branco (BRA)		Q

=== Final ===
Final
Place	Rower	Time
1st place, gold medalist(s)	Paul Costello (USA); John B. Kelly Sr. (USA)	6:34.0
2nd place, silver medalist(s)	Marc Detton (FRA); Jean-Pierre Stock (FRA)	6:38.0
3rd place, bronze medalist(s)	Rudolf Bosshard (SUI); Heini Thoma (SUI)	at ten lengths to France
4	Carlos Branco (BRA); Edmundo Branco (BRA)	
