= Nicolas Appels =

Belgian wrestler

Personal information
- Nationality: Belgian
- Born: 6 February 1896 Antwerp, Belgium

Sport
- Sport: Wrestling

Nicolas Appels (born 6 February 1896) was a Belgian wrestler. He competed in the men's Greco-Roman light heavyweight at the 1928 Summer Olympics.
