= Jacob Simonis =

Dutch wrestler (1890 - 1962)

Personal information
- Nationality: Dutch
- Born: 16 November 1890 Amsterdam, Netherlands
- Died: 22 December 1962 (aged 72) Amsterdam, Netherlands

Sport
- Sport: Wrestling

Jacob Simonis (16 November 1890 – 22 December 1962) was a Dutch wrestler. He competed in the men's Greco-Roman heavyweight at the 1928 Summer Olympics.
