= André Houpelyne =

Belgian rower

Personal information
- Nationality: Belgian
- Born: 18 December 1900
- Died: 6 November 1986 (aged 85)

Sport
- Sport: Rowing

André Houpelyne (18 December 1900 – 6 November 1986) was a Belgian rower. He competed in the men's double sculls event at the 1928 Summer Olympics.
