= Clody =

Clody may refer to:

- River Clody, south-east Ireland, a tributary of the River Slaney
- Émile Clody (1903–1960), French wrestler
