= Josef Schneider (rower) =

Swiss rower

Personal information
- Born: 5 March 1891
- Died: May 1966 (aged 75) Thun, Switzerland

Sport
- Sport: Rowing
- Club: See-Club Luzern
Medal record
Men's rowing
Representing Switzerland
Olympic Games
Bronze medal – third place	1924 Paris	Single sculls
European Rowing Championships
Gold medal – first place	1924 Zürich	Single sculls
Silver medal – second place	1925 Prague	Single sculls
Gold medal – first place	1926 Lucerne	Single sculls

Josef Schneider (5 March 1891 – May 1966) was a Swiss rower who competed in the 1924 Summer Olympics. In 1924 he won the bronze medal in the single sculls event.
