= Paul Robineau =

French rower

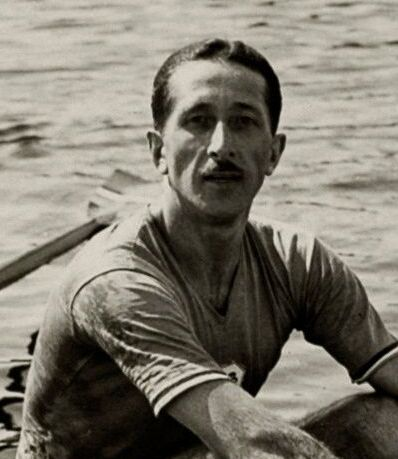
- Paul Robineau in 1928

Personal information
- Nationality: French

Sport
- Sport: Rowing

Paul Robineau was a French rower. He competed in the men's double sculls event at the 1928 Summer Olympics.
