= Imre Szalay =

Hungarian wrestler

Personal information
- Nationality: Hungarian
- Born: 1 November 1899 Budapest, Austria-Hungary
- Died: 9 March 1942 (aged 42)

Sport
- Sport: Wrestling

Imre Szalay (1 November 1899 – 9 March 1942) was a Hungarian wrestler. He competed in the men's Greco-Roman light heavyweight at the 1928 Summer Olympics.
