= Ludwig Wessely =

Austrian hurdler

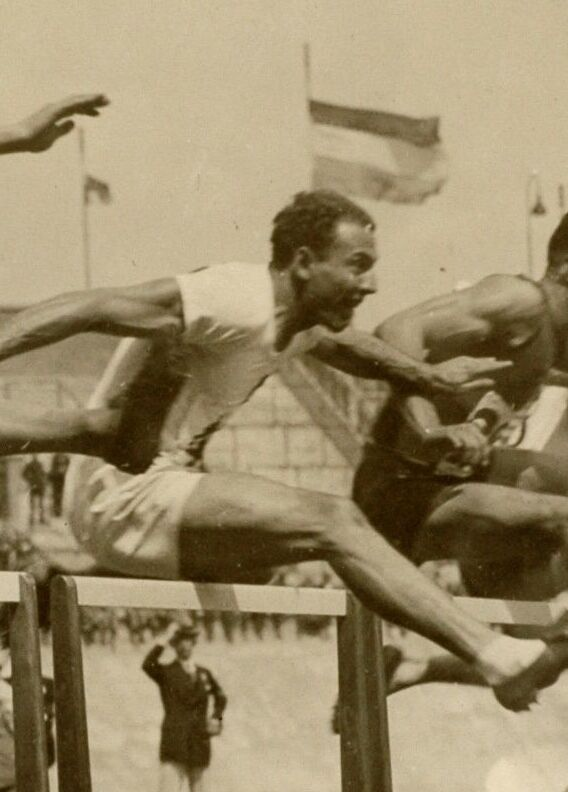
- Ludwig Vesely in 1928

Personal information
- Nationality: Austrian
- Born: 20 August 1903
- Died: 31 July 1986 (aged 82)

Sport
- Sport: Track and field
- Event: 110 metres hurdles

Ludwig Wessely (20 August 1903 – 31 July 1986) was an Austrian hurdler. He competed in the men's 110 metres hurdles at the 1928 Summer Olympics.
