= Viktor Flessl =

Austrian rower

Olympic medal record

Men's rowing
Bronze medal – third place	1928 Amsterdam	Double sculls

Viktor Flessl (6 November 1898 – 18 December 1943) was an Austrian rower who competed in the 1928 Summer Olympics. In 1928 he won the bronze medal in the double sculls event with his partner Leo Losert.

He was killed in action during World War II.
