= Andrzej Osiecimski-Czapski =

Polish rower

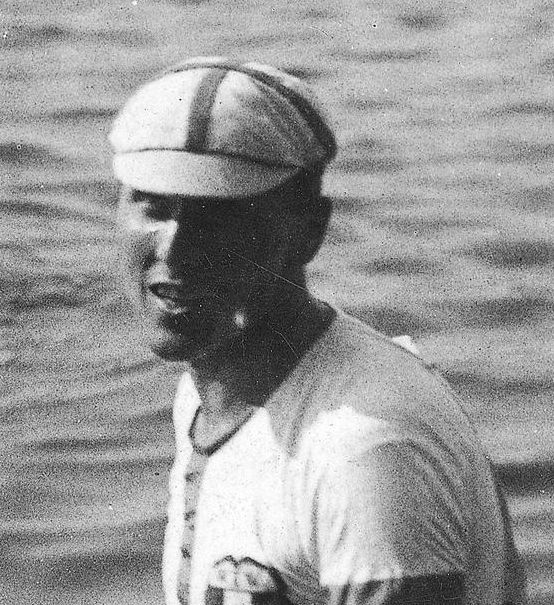
- Osiecimski-Czapski in 1925

Personal information
- Born: 8 July 1899 Vilnius, Russian Empire
- Died: 14 May 1976 (aged 76) Westport, Connecticut, United States

Sport
- Sport: Rowing
Medal record
Men's rowing
Representing Poland
European Rowing Championships
Bronze medal – third place	1925 Prague	Single sculls

Andrzej Osiecimski-Czapski (8 July 1899 – 14 May 1976) was a Polish rower. He competed at the 1924 Summer Olympics in Paris with the men's single sculls where he was eliminated in heat one.

Osiecimski-Czapski was also an ice hockey player with AZS Warszawa, and competed for the Polish national team at the 1926 European Championships.
