= Pongrácz =

Pongrácz or Pongratz is a surname. Notable people with the surname include:

- Anton Pongratz (1948-2008), Romanian fencer
- Daniel Pongratz (born 1983), German musician
- Gergely Pongrátz (1932-2005), Hungarian revolutionary
- István Pongrácz (1584–1619), Hungarian Jesuit priest
- Jenő Pongrácz (1852–1933), Hungarian jurist
- József Pongrácz (1891–1959), Hungarian wrestler
- Lothar Pongratz (1952-2013), German bobsledder
- Oliver Pongratz (born 1973), German badminton player
- Ștefan Pongratz (born 1930), Romanian rower
- Viktor Pongrácz (born 1995), Hungarian football player
- Zoltán Pongrácz (1912–2007), Hungarian composer
