= Konstantīns Visotskis =

Latvian painter (1864–1938)

- Born: Konstantin Semyonovich Vysotskiy; 29 May 1864; Moscow, Russia
- Died: 6 January 1938 (aged 73); Riga, Latvia
- Occupation: Painter

Konstantīns Visotskis (Russian: Константин Семёнович Высотский, 29 May 1864 – 6 January 1938) was a Russian and Latvian painter. He graduated from the Moscow School of Painting, Sculpture and Architecture in 1891 and exhibited at Moscow art exhibitions, including those of the Peredvizhniki. The main subjects of his work were nature and animals. After the 1917, revolution in Russia he emigrated to Riga. His work was part of the art competitions at the 1928 Summer Olympics, the 1932 Summer Olympics, and the 1936 Summer Olympics.
