= Adolf Rieger =

German wrestler (1899–1956)

Medal record

Men's Greco-Roman wrestling

Representing Germany

Olympic Games
Silver medal – second place	1928 Amsterdam	Light heavyweight

Adolf Rieger (25 August 1899 – 2 May 1956) was a German wrestler who competed in the 1928 Summer Olympics.
