= Ibrahim Sobh =

Egyptian wrestler

Personal information
- Nationality: Egyptian
- Born: 1901 Cairo, Egypt
- Died: 1969 (aged 67–68) Cairo, Egypt

Sport
- Sport: Wrestling

Ibrahim Sobh (1901 – 1969) was an Egyptian wrestler. He competed in the men's Greco-Roman heavyweight at the 1928 Summer Olympics.
