= Kārlis Pētersons =

Latvian wrestler (1903–1980)

Personal information
- Nationality: Latvian
- Born: 1903 Rūjiena, Vidzemes guberņa, Russian Empire (now Latvia)
- Died: possibly in 1980 (aged 76–77)
- Occupation: Army officer

Sport
- Country: Latvia
- Sport: Wrestling

Kārlis Pētersons (1903 – possibly in 1980) was a Latvian wrestler and army officer.

Pētersons was an officer of the Latvian Army and head of the Army Sports Club (ASK) heavy athletics department, as well as a member of ASK and Krauze Sports Club.

He was the Latvian light heavy-weight (1927–1930) and heavy-weight champion in 1936 and 1937. On the European level, Pētersons' highest finish was 4th place in the European Championships in 1930 and 1931. His most notable competition was the men's Greco-Roman light heavyweight at the 1928 Summer Olympics, where he was eliminated in Round 3.
