= Ted Bull =

Australian rower

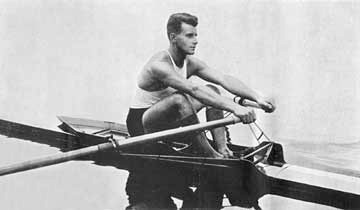
- Ted Bull c. 1924

Personal information
- Born: 1898 Cowra, New South Wales.
- Died: 10 April 1967 (aged 68–69) Cowra, New South Wales.

Sport
- Sport: Rowing
- Club: Leichhardt Rowing Club

Arthur William "Ted" Bull (1898 – 10 April 1967) was an Australian rower. He was twice the Australian national sculling champion who represented at the 1924 Olympics.

== Rowing career ==
Bull joined the Leichhardt Rowing Club after WWI.

In 1922 he was the New South Wales state entrant who contested and won the President's Cup - the Australian single sculls title - at the Interstate Regatta. He won that same title in 1923.

As the prominent Australian sculler of the early 1920s he was selected to compete at 1924 Olympics. He won his heat and reached the final of the single sculls event, but did not finish the race. He was reportedly leading the race till the last 200m.
