= Ernst Baylon =

Austrian fencer (1903–1975)

Personal information
- Full name: Ernest Laurenz Matthäus Baylon
- Born: 21 October 1903 Vienna, Austria-Hungary
- Died: October 1975

Sport
- Sport: Fencing

Ernst Baylon (21 October 1903 – October 1975) was an Austrian fencer. He competed in the team foil event at the 1928 and 1936 Summer Olympics.
