= Leo Losert =

Austrian rower

Olympic medal record

Men's rowing
Bronze medal – third place	1928 Amsterdam	Double sculls

Leo Losert (31 October 1902 – 22 October 1982) was an Austrian rower who competed in the 1928 Summer Olympics.

In 1928 he was part of the Austrian boat, which won the bronze medal in the double sculls event with Viktor Flessl.
