= Richard Brünner =

Austrian fencer (1888–1962)

Personal information
- Born: 18 November 1888 Vienna
- Died: 25 November 1962 (aged 74)

Sport
- Sport: Fencing

Richard Hans Ferdinand Brünner (18 November 1888 – 25 November 1962) was an Austrian fencer. He competed in the foil competitions at the 1924 and 1928 Summer Olympics.
