= Gerhard Voigt =

German rower

Personal information
- Nationality: German
- Born: 7 August 1904; Leipzig, Germany
- Died: 8 December 1958 (aged 54)

Sport
- Sport: Rowing

Gerhard Voigt (7 August 1904 – 8 December 1958) was a German rower. He competed in the men's double sculls event at the 1928 Summer Olympics.
