= Gustav Grachegg =

Austrian equestrian (1882–1945)

Personal information
- Nationality: Austrian
- Born: 17 November 1882 Spielfeld, Austria-Hungary
- Died: 13 May 1945 (aged 62) Soviet Union

Sport
- Sport: Equestrian

Gustav Grachegg (17 November 1882 – 13 May 1945) was an Austrian equestrian. He competed in the individual dressage event at the 1928 Summer Olympics. He was reported to be missing in action during World War II.
