= Jorge Briola =

Argentine wrestler

Personal information
- Nationality: Argentine
- Born: 1907

Sport
- Sport: Wrestling

Jorge Briola (born 1907, date of death unknown) was an Argentine wrestler. He competed in the men's Greco-Roman heavyweight at the 1928 Summer Olympics.
