= Ibrahim Moustafa =

Egyptian Greco-Roman wrestler

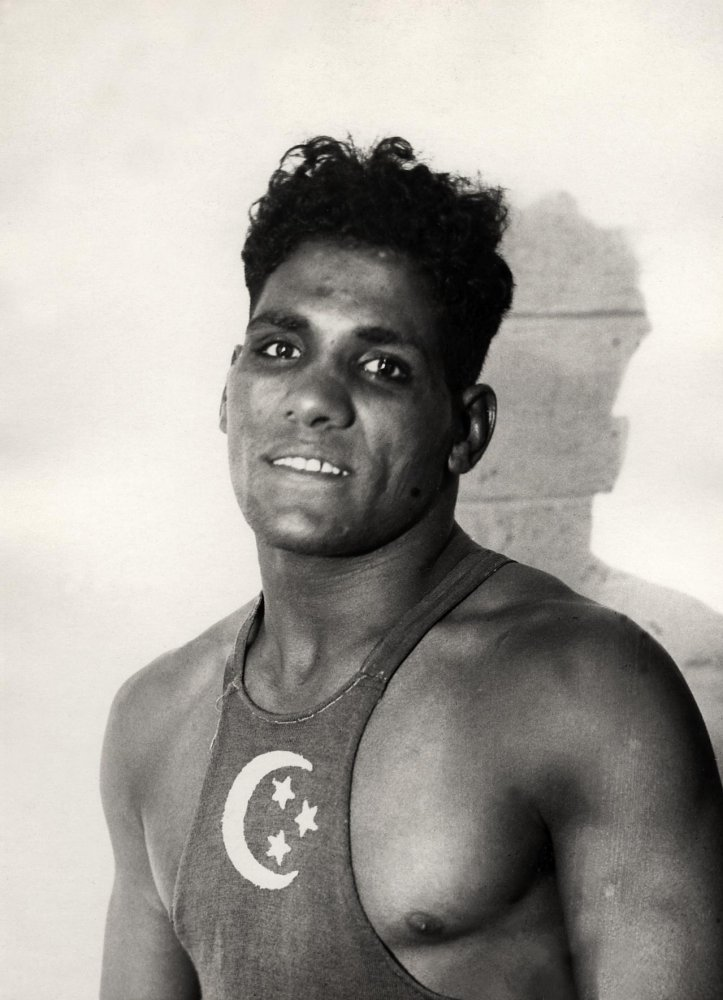
- Ibrahim Moustafa at the 1928 Olympics

Personal information
- Born: 23 September 1904 Alexandria, Egypt
- Died: 9 October 1968 (aged 64) Mexico City, Mexico

Sport
- Sport: Greco-Roman wrestling
Medal record
Men's Greco-Roman wrestling
Representing Egypt
Olympic Games
Gold medal – first place	1928 Amsterdam	Light heavyweight

Ibrahim Moustafa (Egyptian Arabic: ابراهيم مصطفى, 23 September 1904 – 9 October 1968) was a Greco-Roman wrestler from Egypt. At his first international tournament, the 1924 Olympics, he finished fourth in the light-heavyweight category. Four years later he won the gold medal in this event, becoming the second Egyptian Olympic champion after Sayed Nosseir. At the 1928 Summer Olympics he was the flag bearer for Egypt in the opening ceremony. Next year, upon invitation from the Swedish Wrestling Federation, Moustafa toured Europe and competed in several international tournaments.

A carpenter by profession, upon returning home he became a wrestling coach, and prepared one of his three sons, Adel Ibrahim Moustafa, for the 1948 and 1952 Olympics. After his death, the annual Ibrahim Moustafa International Tournament was carried out in his honor.
