= Hermann Geißler =

Austrian sprinter

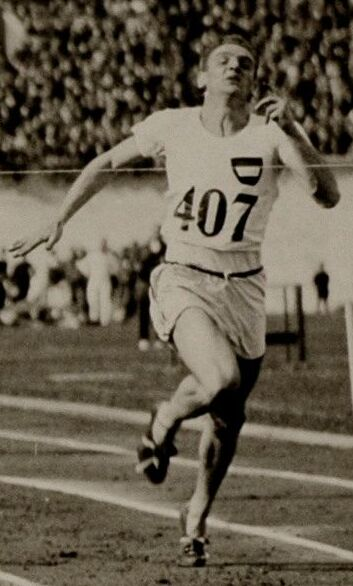
- Hermann Geißler in 1928

Personal information
- Nationality: Austrian
- Born: 5 July 1905
- Died: 4 October 1970 (aged 65)

Sport
- Sport: Sprinting
- Event: 100 metres

Hermann Geißler (5 July 1905 – 4 October 1970) was an Austrian sprinter. He competed in the men's 100 metres at the 1928 Summer Olympics.
