= Vilis Cimmermanis =

Latvian long-distance runner

Personal information
- Born: 29 December 1896 Riga, Latvia
- Died: 29 May 1936 (aged 39) Riga, Latvia

Sport
- Country: Latvia
- Sport: athletics
- Club: Rīgās Garnizona Sporta Klubs

Vilhelms "Vilis" Cimmermanis (29 December 1896 – 29 May 1936) was a Latvian long-distance runner and speed skater. Domestically, Cimmermanis would represent the sports club Rīgās Garnizona Sporta Klubs. Cimmermanis would compete at the 1924 Summer Olympics for Latvia for their first appearance at an Olympic Games. He would not medal in either of the events he participated in.

He would also compete at the 1928 Summer Olympics, competing in the men's marathon. He would not finish the race and would be unranked.

== Biography ==
Vilhelms "Vilis" Cimmermanis was born on 29 December 1896 in Riga, Latvia. Domestically, Cimmermanis would represent the sports club Rīgās Garnizona Sporta Klubs.

He would compete at the 1924 Summer Olympics in Paris, France, representing Latvia for their first appearance at an Olympic Games. There, he would compete in two athletics events. He would first compete in the finals of the men's 10,000 metres on 6 July against 31 other known competitors. There, he would not finish the race and would be unranked. He would then compete in the semifinals of the men's 5000 metres on 8 July against thirteen other competitors. There, he would place twelfth and would not advance to the finals of the event.

After the 1924 Summer Games, Cimmermanis would again compete at another Olympic Games. He would compete at the 1928 Summer Olympics held in Amsterdam, the Netherlands, representing Latvia in one athletics event. He would compete in the men's marathon on 5 August against 68 other competitors. There, he would not finish the race and would be unranked.

Outside of athletics, he was also a speed skater, competing in various races in Riga. He later died on 29 May 1936 in Riga.
