= Han Cox =

Dutch rower

Personal information
- Born: Henri Cox; 21 May 1899 Arnhem, Netherlands
- Died: 18 March 1979 (aged 79) Deventer, Netherlands

Sport
- Sport: Rowing
- Club: Het Spaarne, Haarlem
Medal record
Men's rowing
Representing the Netherlands
European Rowing Championships
Bronze medal – third place	1930 Liège	Double scull

Henri "Han" Cox (21 May 1899 – 18 March 1979) was a Dutch rower. He competed at the 1928 Summer Olympics in Amsterdam with the men's double sculls where they were eliminated in the quarter-final.
