= Charles McIlvaine (rower) =

American rower (1903–1975)

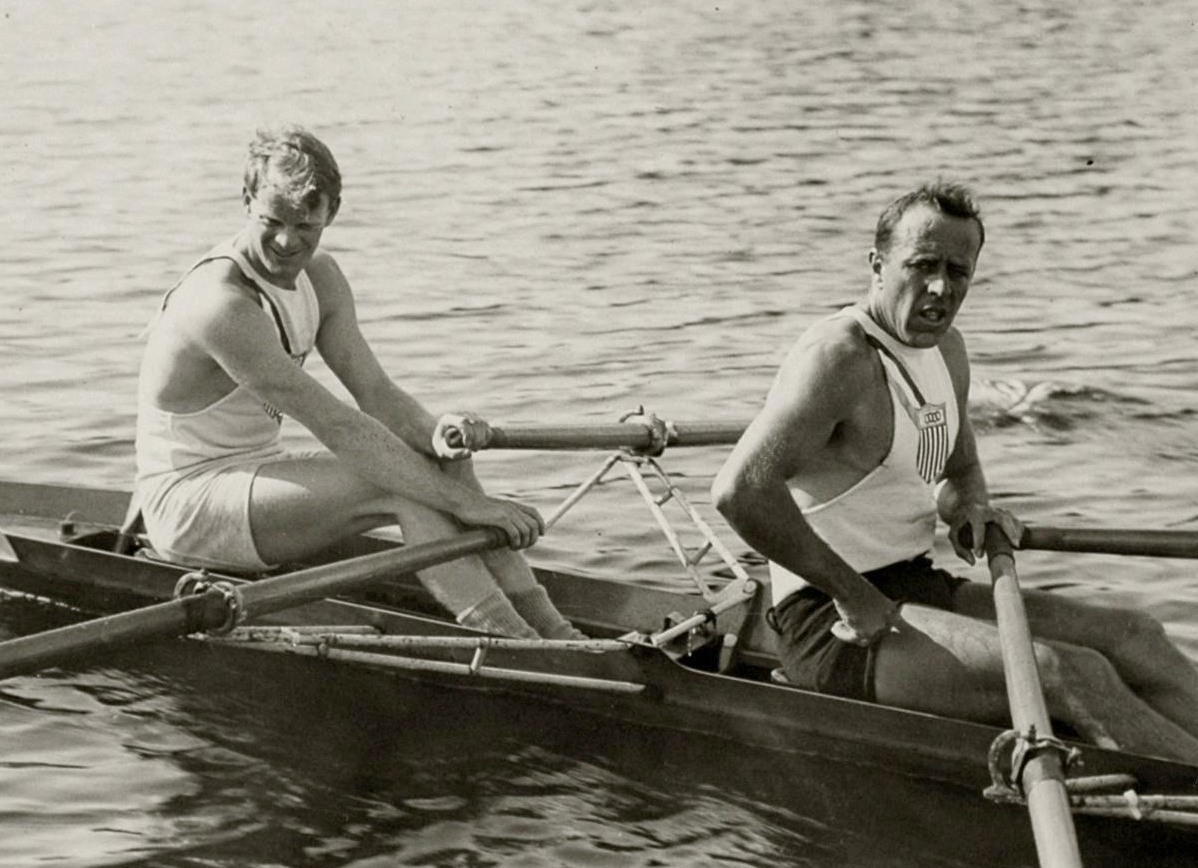
- McIlvaine (left) and Costello at the 1928 Olympics

Personal information
- Born: August 6, 1903 Philadelphia, Pennsylvania, U.S.
- Died: January 30, 1975 (aged 71) Ocean City, New Jersey, U.S.
- Height: 1.79 m (5 ft 10 in)
- Weight: 69 kg (152 lb)

Sport
- Sport: Rowing
- Club: Penn AC, Philadelphia
Medal record
Men's rowing
Representing the United States
Olympic Games
Gold medal – first place	1928 Amsterdam	Double sculls

Charles Joseph McIlvaine Sr. (August 6, 1903 – January 30, 1975) was an American rower who won a gold medal in the double sculls at the 1928 Olympics, together with Paul Costello. His son, Charles McIlvaine Jr., also became a competitive rower and won a gold medal at the 1955 Pan-American Games.
