= Hans Lion =

Austrian fencer

Personal information
- Born: 11 May 1904
- Died: 8 August 1969 (aged 65)

Sport
- Sport: Fencing

Hans Lion (11 May 1904 – 8 August 1969) was an Austrian Olympic fencer. He competed at the 1928 and 1936 Summer Olympics.
