= Mehmet Çoban =

Turkish wrestler (1905–1969)

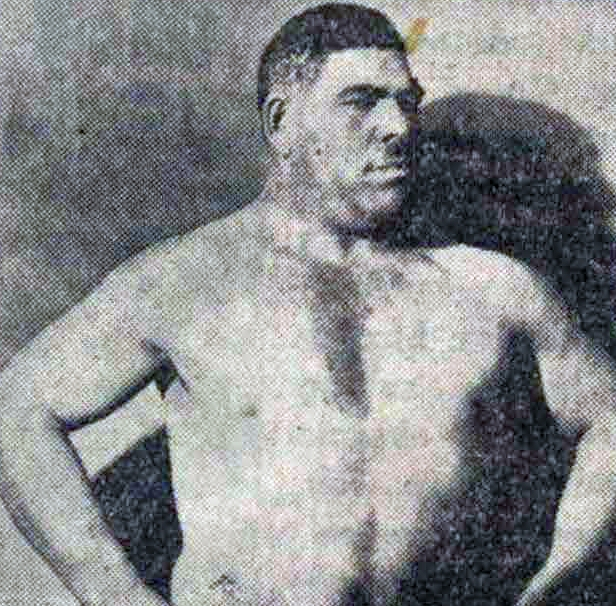
Çoban Mehmet

Mehmet Çoban (1905–1969), a.k.a. Koç Çoban Mehmet, was a Turkish Olympian wrestler in the heavyweight division of Greco-Roman style.

He was born 1905 in Balıkesir, Ottoman Empire. A shepherd, he was discovered by the local military commander Hikmet Pasha during a Turkish traditional sport yağlı güreş (oil wrestling) match, and was sent to Istanbul to join "İstanbul Güreş İhtisas Kulübü", a renowned club specialized in wrestling. During his sport career from 1928 until his retirement in 1940, he was the only heavyweight wrestler of Turkey's national Greco-Roman wrestling team.

Mehmet Çoban became 5 times Balkan champion and earned also once the silver medal at the Balkan and the European Championships each. At his age of 41, Mehmet Çoban won a bronze medal at the European Championship. He participated at the 1928 and 1936 Olympics, ranking 8th and 4th respectively. Mehmet Çoban died in 1969.
