= Robert Gaupset =

Norwegian wrestler

Personal information
- Nationality: Norwegian
- Born: 23 March 1906 Kristiansund, Norway
- Died: 10 November 1964 (aged 58) Bergen, Norway

Sport
- Sport: Wrestling

Robert Gaupset (23 March 1906 – 10 November 1964) was a Norwegian wrestler. He competed in the men's Greco-Roman light heavyweight at the 1928 Summer Olympics.
