= Maurice Rieder =

Swiss rower

Personal information
- Born: Maurice R. Rieder c. 1897
- Died: 25 December 1979

Sport
- Sport: Rowing
- Club: Grasshopper Club Zürich
Medal record
Men's rowing
Representing Switzerland
European Rowing Championships
Gold medal – first place	1926 Lucerne	Double sculls
Gold medal – first place	1927 Como	Double sculls

Maurice R. Rieder (c. 1897 – 25 December 1979) was a Swiss rower.

== Olympics ==
He competed at the 1928 Summer Olympics in Amsterdam with the men's double sculls where they were eliminated in the quarter-final.
