= Mario Melchiori =

Italian rower

Personal information
- Nationality: Italian

Sport
- Sport: Rowing

Mario Melchiori was an Italian rower. He competed in the men's double sculls event at the 1928 Summer Olympics.
