= Hjalmar Nyström =

Finnish wrestler (1904–1960)

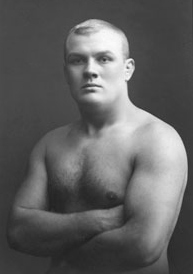

Personal information
- Born: 28 March 1904 Helsinki, Grand Duchy of Finland, Russian Empire
- Died: 6 December 1960 (aged 56) Helsinki, Finland

Sport
- Sport: Wrestling
- Club: HAK, Helsinki
Medal record
Representing Finland
Olympic Games
Silver medal – second place	1928 Amsterdam	Greco-Roman, +82.5 kg
Bronze medal – third place	1936 Berlin	Freestyle, +87 kg
European Championships
Silver medal – second place	1930 Stockholm	Greco-Roman, +87 kg
Silver medal – second place	1931 Prague	Greco-Roman, +87 kg
Silver medal – second place	1935 Copenhagen	Greco-Roman, +87 kg
Bronze medal – third place	1934 Stockholm	Freestyle, +87 kg

Hjalmar Eemil Nyström (28 March 1904 – 6 December 1960) was a Finnish heavyweight wrestler who competed at the 1924, 1928 and 1936 Olympics. He placed tenth in freestyle wrestling in 1924 and won a silver medal in Greco-Roman wrestling in 1928. At the 1936 Olympics he won a freestyle bronze and finished fifth in the Greco-Roman contest. At the European championships he won three silver medals in Greco-Roman wrestling in 1930, 1931 and 1935 and a freestyle bronze in 1934. Domestically, Nyström won ten titles, all in Greco-Roman wrestling, in 1924, 1926–28, 1930–31, 1935–37 and 1939. Nyström worked as a steam locomotive fireman and later as a train driver.
