= Aleardo Donati =

Italian wrestler (1904–1990)

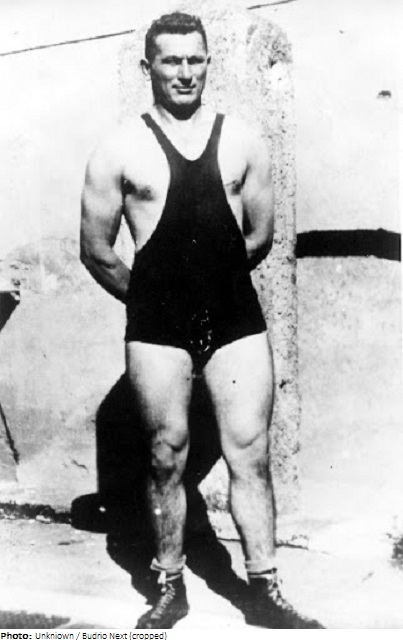
- Born: 8 March 1904; Bentivoglio, Italy
- Died: 29 December 1990 (aged 86)

Aleardo Donati (8 March 1904 – 29 December 1990) was an Italian wrestler. He competed at the 1924, 1928, 1932 and the 1936 Summer Olympics. He also won 19 national championships from 1922 to 1942.
