= Bela Juhasz (wrestler) =

Yugoslav wrestler (1906–1967)

Personal information
- Nationality: Yugoslav
- Born: 1906
- Died: 1967 (aged 60–61)

Sport
- Sport: Wrestling

Bela Juhasz (1906 – 1967) was a Yugoslav wrestler. He competed in the men's Greco-Roman light heavyweight at the 1928 Summer Olympics.
