= Eugen Wiesberger Sr. =

Austrian wrestler

Personal information
- Nationality: Austrian
- Born: 23 March 1900 Steyrling, Austria-Hungary
- Died: 14 June 1953 (aged 53)

Sport
- Sport: Wrestling

Eugen Wiesberger Sr. (23 March 1900 – 14 June 1953) was an Austrian wrestler. He competed in the men's Greco-Roman heavyweight at the 1928 Summer Olympics.
