= Georg Gehring =

German wrestler (1903–1943)

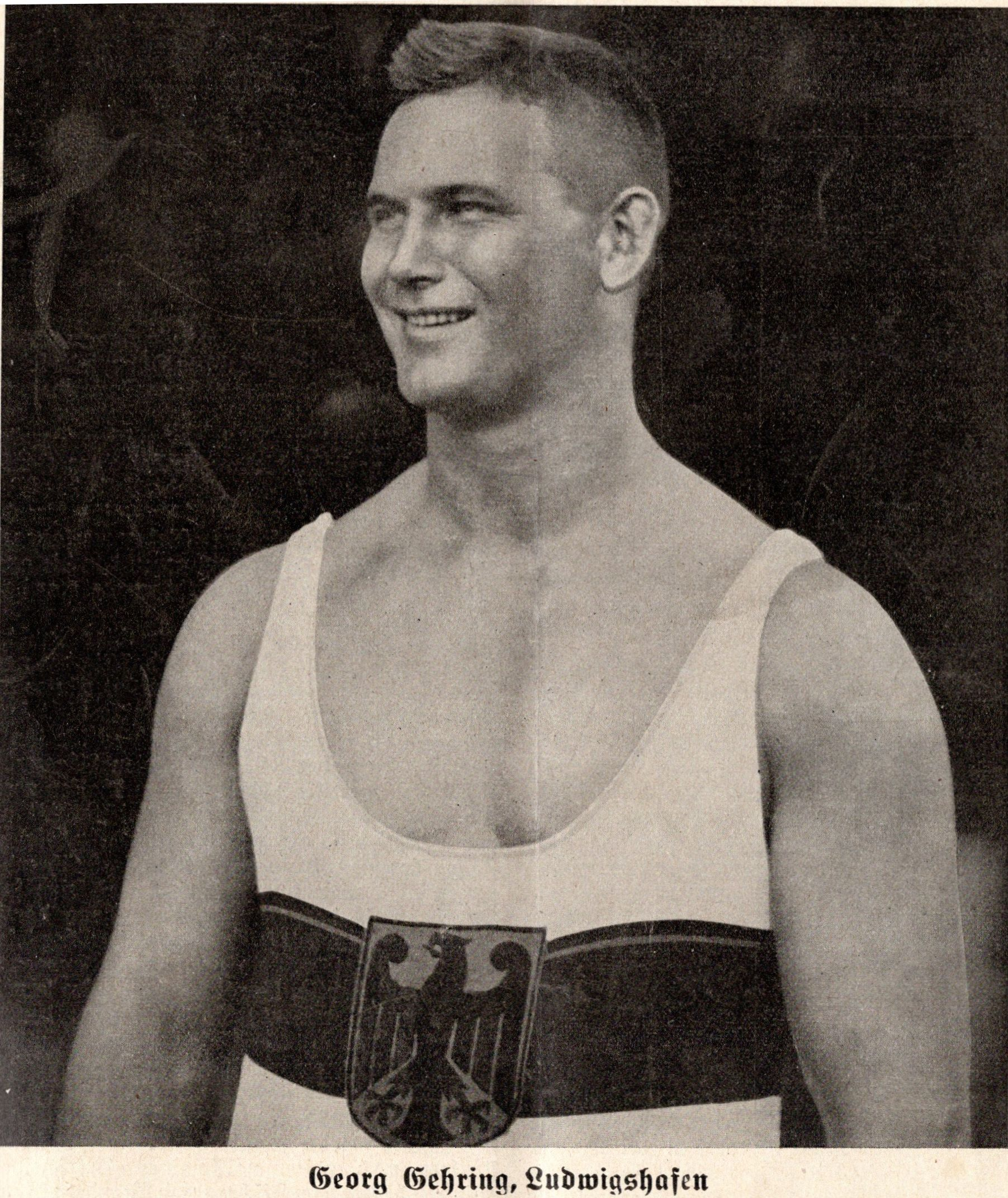

Medal record

Men's Greco-Roman wrestling

Representing Germany

Olympic Games
| Bronze medal – third place | 1928 Amsterdam | Heavyweight |

Georg Gehring (14 November 1903 in Frankenthal – 31 October 1943 in Dnipro) was a German wrestler who competed in the 1928, 1932, and 1936 Summer Olympics. He was killed in action during World War II.
