= Rajmund Badó =

Hungarian Greco-Roman wrestler

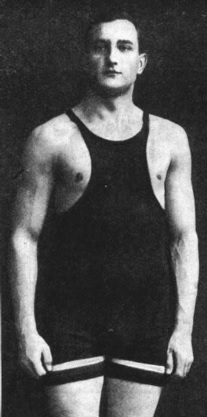
- Born: 15 August 1902; Budapest, Austria-Hungary (present-day Republic of Hungary)
- Died: 26 December 1997 (aged 95); New York City, New York, United States
- Occupations: Athlete; wrestler

Rajmund Badó
Medal record

Men's Greco-Roman wrestling

Representing Hungary

Olympic Games
| Bronze medal – third place | 1924 Paris | Heavyweight |

Rajmund Badó (15 August 1902 – 26 December 1997) was a Hungarian wrestler who competed in the 1924 Summer Olympics and the 1928 Summer Olympics. At the 1924 Summer Olympics, he won the bronze medal in the Greco-Roman wrestling heavyweight class.
