= Alberts Zvejnieks =

Latvian wrestler (1902–1987)

Personal information
- Nationality: Latvian
- Born: 28 December 1902 Daugavpils, Latvia
- Died: 30 November 1987 (aged 84) Riga, Latvia

Sport
- Sport: Wrestling

Alberts Zvejnieks (28 December 1902 – 30 November 1987) was a Latvian wrestler. He competed at the 1928 Summer Olympics and the 1936 Summer Olympics.
