= Josef Urban =

Czechoslovak wrestler (1899–1968)

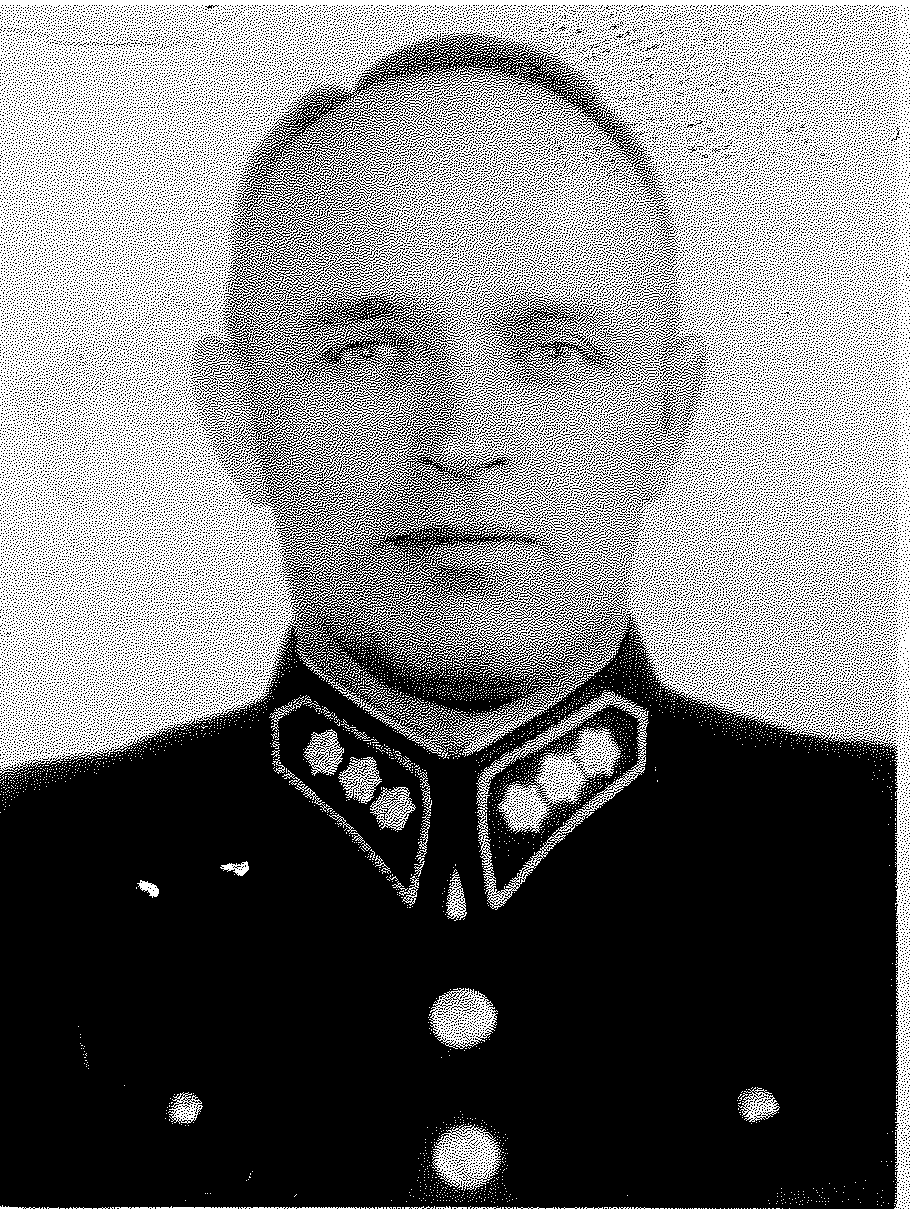

Medal record

Men's Greco-Roman wrestling

Representing Czechoslovakia

Olympic Games
Silver medal – second place	1932 Los Angeles	Heavyweight

Josef Urban (17 June 1899 – 2 September 1968) was a Czechoslovak wrestler. He was born in Středočeský kraj in June 1899. He won an Olympic silver medal in Greco-Roman wrestling in 1932. He also competed at the 1928 Summer Olympics. Urban died on 2 September 1968, at the age of 69.
