= Estonia at the 1928 Summer Olympics =

- IOC code: EST
- NOC: Estonian Olympic Committee

in Amsterdam
- Competitors: 20 (men) in 5 sports
- Flag bearer: Gustav Kalkun
- Medals Ranked 16th: Gold 2 Silver 1 Bronze 2 Total 5

Summer Olympics appearances (overview)
- 1920; 1924; 1928; 1932; 1936; 1948–1988; 1992; 1996; 2000; 2004; 2008; 2012; 2016; 2020; 2024

Other related appearances
- Russian Empire (1908–1912); Soviet Union (1952–1988)

Estonia competed at the 1928 Summer Olympics in Amsterdam, Netherlands.

== Medalists ==
Medal	Name	Sport	Event
Gold	Osvald Käpp	Wrestling	Men's freestyle lightweight
Gold	Voldemar Väli	Wrestling	Men's Greco-Roman featherweight
Silver	Arnold Luhaäär	Weightlifting	Men's +82.5 kg
Bronze	Nikolai Vekšin; William von Wirén; Eberhard Vogdt; Georg Faehlmann; Andreas Faehlmann	Sailing	6 m class
Bronze	Albert Kusnets	Wrestling	Men's Greco-Roman middleweight

== The 1928 Estonian Olympic Team ==
Estonia sent 20 athletes and 3 representatives to those games.

Representatives

Representatives were Harald Tammer, Arnold Veiss and Johannes Villemson.

Other delegations

Estonians in other delegations were 1924 Summer Olympics bronze medalist Aleksander Klumberg, who was athletics coach for Poland and Albert Vollrat massage therapist in Hungarian olympic team.

== Athletics ==
Men
Track & road events

Athlete	Event	Heat		Quarterfinal		Semifinal		Final	
Athlete	Event	Result	Rank	Result	Rank	Result	Rank	Result	Rank
Karl Laas	Marathon	—N/a						DNF	

Field events

Athlete	Event	Qualification		Final	
Athlete	Event	Distance	Position	Distance	Position
Nikolai Feldmann	Shot put	13.54	12	Did not advance	
Gustav Kalkun	Discus Throw	43.09	10	Did not advance	
Johan Meimer	Javelin Throw	61.46	8	Did not advance	

Combined events – Men's decathlon

Athlete	Event	100 m	LJ	SP	HJ	400 m	100H	DT	PV	JT	1500 m	Final	Rank
Johan Meimer	Result	11,6	6.43	11.20	1.75	55,0	18,6	35.32	3.00	56.88	5.16,2	6733,15	13
Johan Meimer	Points											6733,15	13

== Boxing ==
Men

Athlete	Event	1 Round	2 Round	Quarterfinals	Semifinals	Final	
Athlete	Event	Opposition result	Opposition result	Opposition result	Opposition result	Opposition result	Rank
Valter Palm	Men's welterweight	Albert Nuss (LUX); W PTS	Raúl Landini (ARG); L PTS	Did not advance			9

== Sailing ==
The 1928 Olympic scoring system was used.

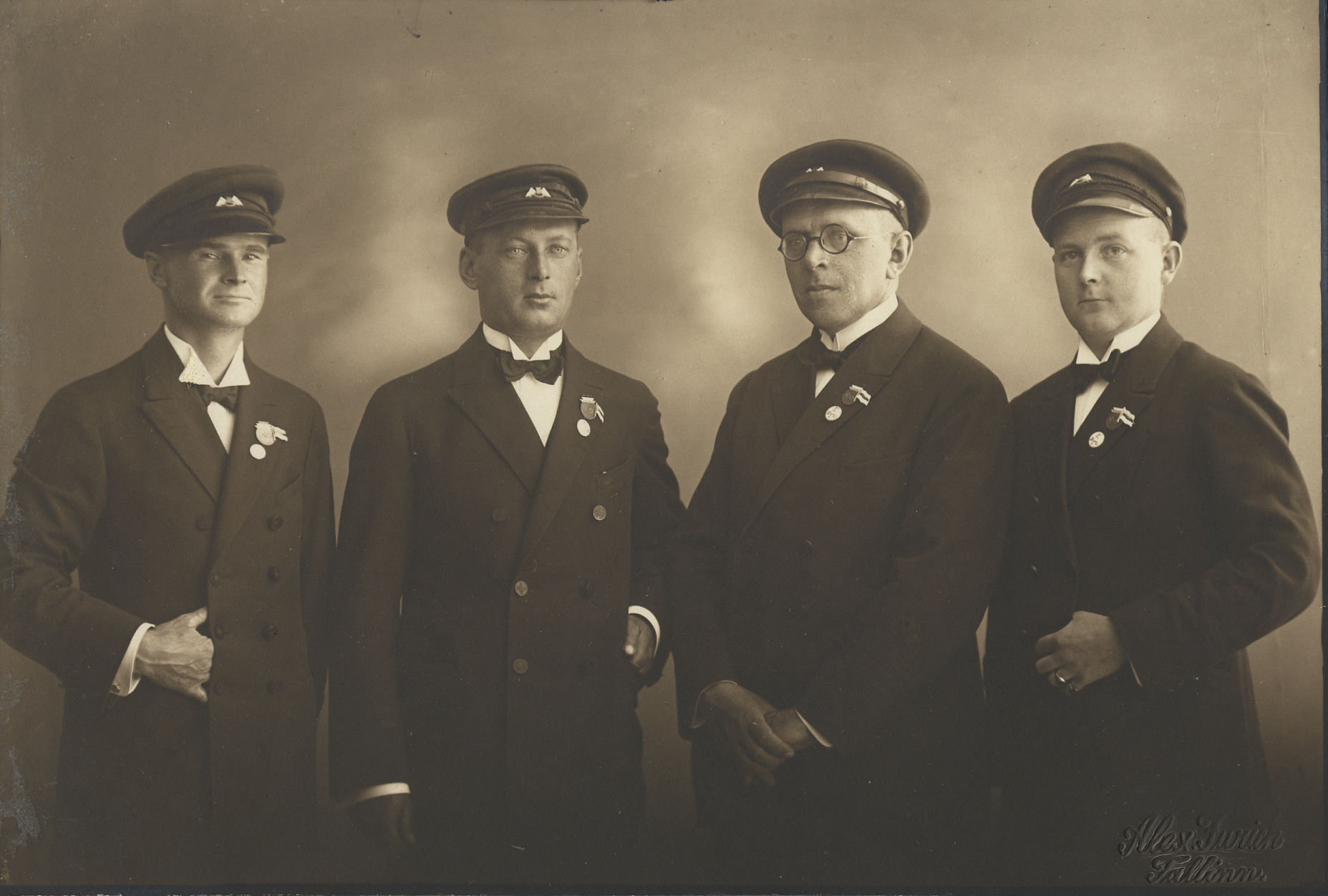
The bronze-winning crew of sailboat Tutti V (from left): Georg Faehlmann, William von Wirén, Nikolai Vekšin and Eberhard Vogdt (missing Andreas Faehlmann)

Men

Athlete	Event	Preliminary series				Final series			Net points	Final rank
Athlete	Event	1	2	3	4	1	2	3	Net points	Final rank
Nikolai Vekšin; William von Wirén; Eberhard Vogdt; Georg Faehlmann; Andreas Faehlmann	International 6 metres class	6	6	2 Q	3 Q	1	3	3	1 x 1st	Bronze

== Weightlifting ==
Men

Athlete	Event	Military press		Snatch		Clean & Jerk		Total	Rank
Athlete	Event	Result	Rank	Result	Rank	Result	Rank	Total	Rank
Aleksander Kask	60 kg	75	9	75	15	100	14	250	14
Leonhard Kukk	75 kg	82,5	15	85	15	110	15	277,5	13
Olaf Luiga	82.5 kg	80	14	95	11	130	9	305	11
Arnold Luhaäär	+82.5 kg	100	8	110	1	150	1	360	Silver

== Wrestling ==
Men's Greco-Roman

Athlete	Event	Elimination pool							Final round	
Athlete	Event	Round 1 result	Round 2 result	Round 3 result	Round 4 result	Round 5 result	Round 6 result	Rank	Final round result	Rank
Eduard Pütsep	−58 kg	Georges Miller (LUX); L	Johannes van Maaren (NED); W 3–0	Herman Andersen (DEN); L F	Kurt Leucht (GER); W	—N/a		6	Did not advance	
Voldemar Väli	−61 kg	Ludwig Schlanger (AUT); W 3–0	František Kratochvíl (TCH); W F 2.57	Ali Kamel (EGY); W F 7.30	Károly Kárpáti (HUN); W F 1.30	Ernst Steinig (GER); W F	BYE	1 Q	Eric Malmberg (SWE); W 3–0	Gold
Osvald Käpp	−67.5 kg	Piero Postini (ITA); W F	Harald Pettersson (SWE); W F	Tayyar Yalaz (TUR); L F	—N/a			9	Did not advance	
Albert Kusnets	−75 kg	BYE	Hermann Simon (GER); W 3–0	Alfred Larsen (NOR); W F	Franja Palcović (YUG); W F	Johannes Jacobsen (DEN); W	Jean Saenen (BEL); W F	2 Q	László Papp (HUN); L 1–2	Bronze
Otto Pohla	−82.5 kg	Max Studer (SUI); W F	Onni Pellinen (FIN); L	Jacobus Hendricus Heijm (NED); W F	Adolf Rieger (GER); L	—N/a		7	Did not advance	

Men's Freestyle

Athlete	Event	Elimination pool							Final round	
Athlete	Event	Round 1 result	Quarterfinal result	Semifinal result	Round 2 result	Round 3 result	Round 4 result	Rank	Final round result	Rank
Eduard Pütsep	−61 kg	Harold Angus (GBR); L	—N/a					9	Did not advance	
Osvald Käpp	−66 kg	Carlo Tesdorf Jørgensen (DEN); W	Clarence Berryman (USA); W	Charles Pacôme (FRA); W	—N/a			1 Q	Birger Nilsen (NOR); W	Gold
Alfred Praks	−72 kg	Theofilos Tomazos (GRE); W	Dr. Lloyd O.Appleton (USA); L	—N/a				6	Did not advance	
