= Switzerland at the 1928 Summer Olympics =

- IOC code: SUI
- NOC: Swiss Olympic Association

in Amsterdam
- Competitors: 133 in 15 sports
- Medals Ranked 6th: Gold 7 Silver 4 Bronze 4 Total 15

Summer Olympics appearances (overview)
- 1896; 1900; ~~1904~~; 1908; 1912; 1920; 1924; 1928; 1932; 1936; 1948; 1952; 1956; 1960; 1964; 1968; 1972; 1976; 1980; 1984; 1988; 1992; 1996; 2000; 2004; 2008; 2012; 2016; 2020; 2024; 2028

Other related appearances
- 1906 Intercalated Games

Switzerland competed at the 1928 Summer Olympics in Amsterdam, Netherlands. 133 competitors, 132 men and 1 woman, took part in 70 events in 15 sports.

== Medalists ==
Medal	Name	Sport	Event	Date
Gold	Georges Miez	Gymnastics	Men's artistic individual all-around	August 10
Gold	Georges Miez	Gymnastics	Men's horizontal bar	August 9
Gold	Hans Grieder, August Güttinger, Hermann Hänggi, Eugen Mack, Georges Miez, Otto Pfister, Eduard Steinemann, Melchior Wezel	Gymnastics	Men's team all-around	August 10
Gold	Hermann Hänggi	Gymnastics	Men's pommel horse	August 8
Gold	Eugen Mack	Gymnastics	Men's vault	August 10
Gold	Hans Bourquin, Hans Schöchlin, Karl Schöchlin	Rowing	Men's coxed pair	August 10
Gold	Ernst Kyburz	Wrestling	Men's freestyle middleweight	August 1
Silver	Hermann Hänggi	Gymnastics	Men's artistic individual all-around	August 10
Silver	Georges Miez	Gymnastics	Men's pommel horse	August 8
Silver	Fritz Bösch, Otto Bucher, Ernst Haas, Joseph Meyer, Karl Schwegler	Rowing	Men's coxed four	August 10
Silver	Arnold Bögli	Wrestling	Men's freestyle light heavyweight	August 1
Bronze	Charles-Gustave Kuhn	Equestrian	Individual jumping	August 12
Bronze	Eugen Mack	Gymnastics	Men's horizontal bar	August 9
Bronze	Hermann Hänggi	Gymnastics	Men's parallel bars	August 9
Bronze	Hans Minder	Wrestling	Men's freestyle featherweight	August 1

== Cycling ==
Nine cyclists, all men, represented Switzerland in 1928.

Individual road race

- Gottlieb Amstein
- Jakob Caironi
- Türel Wanzenried
- Paul Litschi

Team road race

- Gottlieb Amstein
- Jakob Caironi
- Türel Wanzenried

Sprint

- Willi Knabenhans

Time trial

- Erich Fäs

Team pursuit

- Erich Fäs
- Gustave Moos
- Heinz Gilgen
- Joseph Fischler

== Fencing ==
Nine fencers, eight men and 1 woman, represented Switzerland in 1928.

Men's foil

- Eugène Empeyta
- Frédéric Fitting
- John Albaret

Men's team foil

- Édouard Fitting, Frédéric Fitting, Eugène Empeyta, John Albaret, Michel Fauconnet, Jean de Bardel

Men's épée

- Eugène Empeyta
- Henri Jacquet
- Édouard Fitting

Men's team épée

- Édouard Fitting, Henri Jacquet, Frédéric Fitting, Eugène Empeyta, John Albaret, Paul de Graffenried

Women's foil

- Jeanne Morgenthaler

== Football ==
Round of 16

28 May 1928
14:00

Switzerland	0–4	Germany
	Report	Hofmann 17', 75', 85'; Hornauer 42'

Olympic Stadium, Amsterdam
Attendance: 16,158
Referee: Willem Eijmers (Netherlands)

== Hockey ==
Roster

The following is the Switzerland roster in the men's field hockey tournament of the 1928 Summer Olympics.

- Adalbert Koch
- Adolf Fehr
- Charles Piot
- Ernst Luchsinger
- Édouard Mauris
- Alfred Fischer
- Fred Jenny
- Henri Poncet
- Jean Loubert
- Jean-Jacques Auberson
- Maurice Magnin
- Max Zumstein
- Roland Olivier
- René Pellarin
- Roger Rodé
- Werner Fehr
- J. Brun
- E. Coppetti
- F. Hermenjat
- L. Joset
- A. Rhinow

Group play

Pos	Team	Pld	W	D	L	GF	GA	GD	Pts	Qualification
1	India	4	4	0	0	26	0	+26	8	Gold medal match
2	Belgium	4	3	0	1	8	9	−1	6	Bronze medal match
3	Denmark	4	2	0	2	5	8	−3	4	
4	Switzerland	4	1	0	3	2	11	−9	2	
5	Austria	4	0	0	4	1	14	−13	0	

Source: 1928 Official Report, p. 685

17 May 1928
15:50

Switzerland	1–2	Denmark
Loubert ?'	Report	Husted 16'; Holst ?'

Umpires:
L. J. Quarles van Ufford (NED)
M. J. Vandekerckhove (BEL)

20 May 1928
16:00

Belgium	3–0	Switzerland
Delheid 15'; Diercxsens 34'; Vercken 68'	Report

Umpires:
A. Broese van Croenou (NED)
F. Schiff (NED)

22 May 1928
15:00

India	6–0	Switzerland
Marthins 6'; Chand 26', 53', 55', 65'; Gateley ?'	Report

Umpires:
P. Reinberg (GER)
M. Masip Ubis (ESP)

24 May 1928
18:00

Switzerland	1–0	Austria
Fehr ?'	Report

Umpires:
T. Evekink (NED)
P. Regibo (BEL)

== Swimming ==
Men

Athlete	Event	Heat		Semifinal		Final	
Athlete	Event	Time	Rank	Time	Rank	Time	Rank
Robert Wyss	200 m breaststroke	3:02.6		Unknown		Did not advance	

== Water Polo ==
- Othmar Schmalz, Robert Wyss, Robert Hürlimann, Eric Brochon, Ernst Hüttenmoser, Robert Mermoud, Fernand Moret

(DNS: Armand Boppart, Edouard Ruchti, Eugen Tschümperli)

== Weightlifting ==
10 male weightlifters competed for Switzerland.

Featherweight, Men

- Arthur Reinmann (Note: also competed at the 1924 Summer Olympics) (5th)
- Justin Tissot (=14th)

Lightweight, Men

- Albert Aeschmann (Note: also competed at the 1924 Summer Olympics and the 1936 Summer Olympics) (4th)
- Joseph Jaquenoud (9th)

Middleweight, Men

- Ernst Trinkler (=15th)
- Hermann Eichholzer DNF

Light-Heavyweight, Men

- Otto Garnus (Note: also competed at the 1924 Olympics (in athletics)) (10th)
- Edmond Donzé (15th)

Heavyweight, Men

- Franz Riederer (14th)
- Wilhelm Gasser (Note: also referred to as Walter Gasser) (16th)

== Wrestling ==
Men's freestyle bantamweight

- Amédée Piguet (6th)

Men's freestyle featherweight

- Hans Minder (3rd) Bronze

Men's freestyle lightweight

- Hans Mollet (7th)

Men's freestyle welterweight

- Fritz Käsermann (=7th)

Men's freestyle middleweight

- Ernst Kyburz (1st) Gold

Men's freestyle light heavyweight

- Arnold Bögli (2nd) Silver

Men's freestyle heavyweight

- Henri Wernli (5th)

Men's Greco-Roman featherweight

- Isidor Bieri (=14th)

Men's Greco-Roman lightweight

- Ernst Mumenthaler (=13th)

Men's Greco-Roman middleweight

- Otto Frei (=9th)

Men's Greco-Roman light heavyweight

- Max Studer (=14th)
