= Australia at the 1928 Summer Olympics =

- IOC code: AUS
- NOC: Australian Olympic Federation

in Amsterdam
- Competitors: 18 (14 men, 4 women) in 6 sports
- Flag bearer: Bobby Pearce
- Medals Ranked 19th: Gold 1 Silver 2 Bronze 1 Total 4

Summer Olympics appearances (overview)
- 1896; 1900; 1904; 1908; 1912; 1920; 1924; 1928; 1932; 1936; 1948; 1952; 1956; 1960; 1964; 1968; 1972; 1976; 1980; 1984; 1988; 1992; 1996; 2000; 2004; 2008; 2012; 2016; 2020; 2024

Other related appearances
- 1906 Intercalated Games –––– Australasia (1908–1912)

Australia competed at the 1928 Summer Olympics in Amsterdam, Netherlands. 18 competitors, 14 men and 4 women, took part in 26 events in 6 sports.

Due to economic difficulties, Australia could only afford to send ten athletes to the Games, as the estimated cost of funding was A$720 per athlete. However, other athletes were allowed to compete on the condition that they secure private or community funding. Eight athletes were funded in this way, including Dunc Gray.

== Medalists ==
Medal	Name	Sport	Event	Date
Gold	Bobby Pearce	Rowing	Men's single sculls	10 August
Silver	Boy Charlton	Swimming	Men's 400 m freestyle	9 August
Silver	Boy Charlton	Swimming	Men's 1500 m freestyle	6 August
Bronze	Dunc Gray	Cycling	Men's track time trial	5 August

== Athletics ==
Key

- Note–Ranks given for track events are within the athlete's heat only
- Q = Qualified for the next round
- q = Qualified for the next round as a fastest loser or, in field events, by position without achieving the qualifying target
- NR = National record
- N/A = Round not applicable for the event
- Bye = Athlete not required to compete in round
- NP = Not placed

Men
Track & road events

Athlete	Event	Heat		Quarterfinal		Semifinal		Final	
Athlete	Event	Result	Rank	Result	Rank	Result	Rank	Result	Rank
James Carlton	100 m	11.1	2 Q	11.0	5	did not advance			
James Carlton	200 m	22.8	2 Q	22.0	4	did not advance			
Charles Stuart	400 m		4	did not advance					
Charles Stuart	800 m		6	—N/a		did not advance			
William Whyte	800 m		5	—N/a		did not advance			
William Whyte	1500 m	3:59.9	2 Q	—N/a				4:00.4	9
George Hyde	1500 m		6	—N/a				did not advance	
George Hyde	5000 m	—N/a				did not finish		did not advance	
Alf Watson	110 m hurdles		3	—N/a		did not advance			
Alf Watson	400 m hurdles	57.8	4	—N/a		did not advance			

Men
Field Events

Athlete	Event	Qualification		Final	
Athlete	Event	Distance	Position	Distance	Position
Nick Winter	Triple Jump	14.15	12	did not advance	

Women
Track & road events

Athlete	Event	Heat		Semifinal		Final	
Athlete	Event	Result	Rank	Result	Rank	Result	Rank
Edith Robinson	100 m		2 Q		3	did not advance	
Edith Robinson	800 m		5	—N/a		did not advance	

== Cycling ==
Two cyclists, both men, competed for Australia in 1928.

Track cycling

Ranks given are within the heat.

Cyclist	Event	First round		Quarterfinals		Semifinals		Final	
Cyclist	Event	Result	Rank	Result	Rank	Result	Rank	Result	Rank
Jack Standen	Sprint	Unknown	1 Q	Unknown	2	did not advance			5T
Dunc Gray	Time trial	N/A						1:15.3	3rd place, bronze medalist(s)

== Diving ==
Ranks given are within the heat.

Diver	Event	Semifinals			Final		
Diver	Event	Points	Score	Rank	Points	Score	Rank
Harry Morris	3 m board	40	94.96	8	did not advance		
Harry Morris	10 m platform	34	53.42	7	did not advance		

== Rowing ==
Ranks given are within the heat.

Rower	Event	First round		Second round		Quarterfinals		Semifinals		Final	
Rower	Event	Result	Rank	Result	Rank	Result	Rank	Result	Rank	Result	Rank
Bobby Pearce	Single sculls	7:55.8	1 Q	7:28.0	1 Q	7:42.8	1 Q	7:01.8	1 Q	7:11.0	1st place, gold medalist(s)

== Swimming ==
Men

Ranks given are within the heat.

Swimmer	Event	Heats		Semifinals		Final	
Swimmer	Event	Result	Rank	Result	Rank	Result	Rank
Boy Charlton	400 m freestyle	5:23.0	2 Q	5:13.6	2 Q	5:03.6	2nd place, silver medalist(s)
Boy Charlton	1500 m freestyle	20:17.4	2 Q	20:57.0	2 Q	20:02.6	2nd place, silver medalist(s)
Tom Boast	100 m backstroke	1:17.0	1 Q		4	did not advance	

Women

Ranks given are within the heat.

Swimmer	Event	Heats		Semifinals		Final	
Swimmer	Event	Result	Rank	Result	Rank	Result	Rank
Bonnie Mealing	100 m backstroke		4	n/a		did not advance	
Bonnie Mealing	100 m freestyle	1:20.6	3	did not advance			
Edna Davey	100 m freestyle		4	did not advance			
Edna Davey	400 m freestyle	6:12.0	3	did not advance			
Doris Thompson	200 m breaststroke	3:33.6	3 Q		5	did not advance	

== Wrestling ==
Freestyle wrestling
Men's

Athlete	Event	Round 1	Round 2	Quarterfinal	Semifinal	Final	
Athlete	Event	Opposition Result	Opposition Result	Opposition Result	Opposition Result	Opposition Result	Rank
Arthur Ford	Bantamweight	Piguet (SUI); L	n/a		did not advance		7T
Harry Morris	Welterweight	n/a	Haavisto (FIN); L	Appleton (USA); L	Jourlin (FRA); L	Did not advance	5
Thomas Bolger	Middleweight	Kyburz (SUI); L	Praeg (RSA); L	did not advance			6
