= Wrestling at the 1928 Summer Olympics – Men's freestyle light heavyweight =

Men's light heavyweight freestyle wrestling at the Games of the IX Olympiad
- Venue: Krachtsportgebouw
- Dates: July 30–August 1, 1928
- Competitors: 7 from 7 nations

Medalists
1st place, gold medalist(s)		Thure Sjöstedt	Sweden
2nd place, silver medalist(s)		Arnold Bögli	Switzerland
3rd place, bronze medalist(s)		Henri Lefèbre	France

The men's freestyle light heavyweight was a freestyle wrestling event held as part of the Wrestling at the 1928 Summer Olympics programme. It was the third appearance of the event. Light heavyweight was the second-heaviest category, including wrestlers weighing up to 87 kilograms.

== Results ==
Source: Official results; Wudarski

=== Gold medal round ===
Quarterfinals		Semifinals		Final
Heywood Edwards (USA)	W
Edil Rosenqvist (FIN)	L	Heywood Edwards (USA)	W
Jacques Van Assche (BEL)	W	Jacques van Assche (BEL)	L
Bernard Rowe (GBR)	L			Heywood Edwards (USA)	L
Arnold Bögli (SUI)	W			Thure Sjöstedt (SWE)	W
Henri Lefèbre (FRA)	L	Arnold Bögli (SUI)	L
		Thure Sjöstedt (SWE)	W

=== Silver medal round ===
Semifinals	Final
	Arnold Bögli (SUI)	W
	Heywood Edwards (USA)	L

=== Bronze medal round ===
Semifinals	Final
	Henri Lefèbre (FRA)	W
	Heywood Edwards (USA)	L
