= Wrestling at the 1936 Summer Olympics – Men's freestyle lightweight =

Men's freestyle lightweight at the Games of the XI Olympiad
- Venue: Deutschlandhalle
- Dates: 2–4 August 1936
- Competitors: 17 from 17 nations

Medalists
1st place, gold medalist(s)		Károly Kárpáti	Hungary
2nd place, silver medalist(s)		Wolfgang Ehrl	Germany
3rd place, bronze medalist(s)		Hermanni Pihlajamäki	Finland

The men's freestyle lightweight competition at the 1936 Summer Olympics in Berlin took place from 2 August to 4 August at the Deutschlandhalle. Nations were limited to one competitor. This weight class was limited to wrestlers weighing up to 66kg.

This freestyle wrestling competition continued to use the "bad points" elimination system introduced at the 1928 Summer Olympics for Greco-Roman and at the 1932 Summer Olympics for freestyle wrestling, with a slight modification. Each round featured all wrestlers pairing off and wrestling one bout (with one wrestler having a bye if there were an odd number). The loser received 3 points if the loss was by fall or unanimous decision and 2 points if the decision was 2-1 (this was the modification from prior years, where all losses were 3 points). The winner received 1 point if the win was by decision and 0 points if the win was by fall. At the end of each round, any wrestler with at least 5 points was eliminated.

== Schedule ==
Date	Event
2 August 1936	Round 1
3 August 1936	Round 2
4 August 1936	Round 3 Round 4 Round 5 Round 6

== Results ==
=== Round 1 ===
The four wrestlers who won by fall and the one with the bye took the lead, with 0 bad points. The four other winners by decision each received 1 point. Soğanli lost by split decision and had 2 points; all of the other losers were defeated by either fall or unanimous decision, so each received 3 points.

Bouts

Winner	Nation	Victory Type	Loser	Nation
Eiichi Kazama	Japan	Fall	Václav Brdek	Czechoslovakia
Wolfgang Ehrl	Germany	Decision, 3–0	Gottfried Arn	Switzerland
Doc Strong	United States	Decision, 2–1	Sadık Soğancı	Turkey
Göte Melin	Sweden	Fall	Arthur Thompson	Great Britain
Hermanni Pihlajamäki	Finland	Fall	Jean Lalemand	Belgium
Paride Romagnoli	Italy	Decision, 3–0	Dick Garrard	Australia
Károly Kárpáti	Hungary	Decision, 3–0	Charles Delporte	France
Aage Meyer	Denmark	Fall	Howie Thomas	Canada
Adalbert Toots	Estonia	Bye	N/A	N/A

Points

Rank	Wrestler	Nation	Start	Earned	Total
1	Eiichi Kazama	Japan	0	0	0
1	Göte Melin	Sweden	0	0	0
1	Aage Meyer	Denmark	0	0	0
1	Hermanni Pihlajamäki	Finland	0	0	0
1	Adalbert Toots	Estonia	0	0	0
6	Wolfgang Ehrl	Germany	0	1	1
6	Károly Kárpáti	Hungary	0	1	1
6	Paride Romagnoli	Italy	0	1	1
6	Doc Strong	United States	0	1	1
10	Sadik Soğanli	Turkey	0	2	2
11	Gottfried Arn	Switzerland	0	3	3
11	Václav Brdek	Czechoslovakia	0	3	3
11	Charles Delporte	France	0	3	3
11	Dick Garrard	Australia	0	3	3
11	Jean Lalemand	Belgium	0	3	3
11	Howie Thomas	Canada	0	3	3
11	Arthur Thompson	Great Britain	0	3	3

=== Round 2 ===
No wrestlers managed to get through the second round with 0 points; of the five who started with that score, two won by decision and three lost. At the end of the round, five men had 1 point, one had 2 points, and six had 3 points. The five wrestlers who lost in both the first two rounds were eliminated.

Bouts

Winner	Nation	Victory Type	Loser	Nation
Eiichi Kazama	Japan	Decision, 3–0	Adalbert Toots	Estonia
Wolfgang Ehrl	Germany	Fall	Václav Brdek	Czechoslovakia
Doc Strong	United States	Decision, 3–0	Gottfried Arn	Switzerland
Sadik Soğanli	Turkey	Decision, 3–0	Göte Melin	Sweden
Hermanni Pihlajamäki	Finland	Decision, 3–0	Arthur Thompson	Great Britain
Paride Romagnoli	Italy	Fall	Jean Lalemand	Belgium
Károly Kárpáti	Hungary	Fall	Dick Garrard	Australia
Charles Delporte	France	Fall	Aage Meyer	Denmark
Howie Thomas	Canada	Bye	N/A	N/A

Points

Rank	Wrestler	Nation	Start	Earned	Total
1	Wolfgang Ehrl	Germany	1	0	1
1	Károly Kárpáti	Hungary	1	0	1
1	Eiichi Kazama	Japan	0	1	1
1	Hermanni Pihlajamäki	Finland	0	1	1
1	Paride Romagnoli	Italy	1	0	1
6	Doc Strong	United States	1	1	2
7	Charles Delporte	France	3	0	3
7	Göte Melin	Sweden	0	3	3
7	Aage Meyer	Denmark	0	3	3
7	Sadik Soğanli	Turkey	2	1	3
7	Howie Thomas	Canada	3	0	3
7	Adalbert Toots	Estonia	0	3	3
13	Gottfried Arn	Switzerland	3	3	6
13	Václav Brdek	Czechoslovakia	3	3	6
13	Dick Garrard	Australia	3	3	6
13	Jean Lalemand	Belgium	3	3	6
13	Arthur Thompson	Great Britain	3	3	6

=== Round 3 ===
Ehrl and Pihlajamäki maintained their 1-point scores with wins by fall. Kárpáti also won again, by decision to receive his second point. Two men finished with 3 points, and three more with 4 points. Four wrestlers were eliminated with their second losses in this round.

Bouts

Winner	Nation	Victory Type	Loser	Nation
Adalbert Toots	Estonia	Decision, 3–0	Howie Thomas	Canada
Wolfgang Ehrl	Germany	Fall	Eiichi Kazama	Japan
Doc Strong	United States	Decision, 3–0	Göte Melin	Sweden
Hermanni Pihlajamäki	Finland	Fall	Sadik Soğanli	Turkey
Károly Kárpáti	Hungary	Decision, 3–0	Paride Romagnoli	Italy
Charles Delporte	France	Default	Aage Meyer	Denmark

Points

Rank	Wrestler	Nation	Start	Earned	Total
1	Wolfgang Ehrl	Germany	1	0	1
1	Hermanni Pihlajamäki	Finland	1	0	1
3	Károly Kárpáti	Hungary	1	1	2
4	Charles Delporte	France	3	0	3
4	Doc Strong	United States	2	1	3
6	Eiichi Kazama	Japan	1	3	4
6	Paride Romagnoli	Italy	1	3	4
6	Adalbert Toots	Estonia	3	1	4
9	Göte Melin	Sweden	3	3	6
9	Aage Meyer	Denmark	3	3	6
9	Sadik Soğanli	Turkey	3	3	6
9	Howie Thomas	Canada	3	3	6

=== Round 4 ===
Four wrestlers were eliminated in this round, but it was not simply the four losers. Pihlajamäki survived his loss with only 4 points, staying in competition. Kazama, by contrast, was eliminated despite winning, as the win by decision took him from 4 points to 5. Of the four remaining wrestlers, none had fewer than 2 points after the round. The official report ranks Strong 5th and Romagnoli 6th, but Sports-Reference gives Kazama 5th and Strong 6th which is more consistent with the scoring system.

Bouts

Winner	Nation	Victory Type	Loser	Nation
Charles Delporte	France	Withdrew	Adalbert Toots	Estonia
Eiichi Kazama	Japan	Decision, 2–1	Doc Strong	United States
Wolfgang Ehrl	Germany	Decision, 3–0	Paride Romagnoli	Italy
Károly Kárpáti	Hungary	Fall	Hermanni Pihlajamäki	Finland

Points

Rank	Wrestler	Nation	Start	Earned	Total
1	Wolfgang Ehrl	Germany	1	1	2
1	Károly Kárpáti	Hungary	2	0	2
3	Charles Delporte	France	3	0	3
4	Hermanni Pihlajamäki	Finland	1	3	4
5	Eiichi Kazama	Japan	4	1	5
6	Doc Strong	United States	3	2	5
7	Paride Romagnoli	Italy	4	3	7
7	Adalbert Toots	Estonia	4	3	7

=== Round 5 ===
Delporte was the only man eliminated in this round, as Ehrl's loss by split decision moved him only from 2 points to 4. Kárpáti picked up a third point for that bout. Pihlajamäki, starting at 4 points and needing a win by fall to stay in contention, won by fall. This left three men to contest the medals. Kárpáti had already defeated both Pihlajamäki and Ehrl, so could not face them again, making Pihlajamäki against Ehrl the only remaining possible bout. Because Kárpáti had a lower point total than either of the men who would face each other in the next round, Kárpáti secured the gold medal in this round.

Bouts

Winner	Nation	Victory Type	Loser	Nation
Hermanni Pihlajamäki	Finland	Fall	Charles Delporte	France
Károly Kárpáti	Hungary	Decision, 2–1	Wolfgang Ehrl	Germany

Points

Rank	Wrestler	Nation	Start	Earned	Total
1st place, gold medalist(s)	Károly Kárpáti	Hungary	2	1	3
2	Wolfgang Ehrl	Germany	2	2	4
2	Hermanni Pihlajamäki	Finland	4	0	4
4	Charles Delporte	France	3	3	6

=== Round 6 ===
With all but three wrestlers eliminated, Kárpáti guaranteed gold, and Pihlajamäki and Ehrl going into the round tied on points, the sixth round was a straight-up silver/bronze medal match. Ehrl won by fall to take the silver medal.

Bouts

Winner	Nation	Victory Type	Loser	Nation
Wolfgang Ehrl	Germany	Fall	Hermanni Pihlajamäki	Finland

Points

Rank	Wrestler	Nation	Start	Earned	Total
2nd place, silver medalist(s)	Wolfgang Ehrl	Germany	4	0	4
3rd place, bronze medalist(s)	Hermanni Pihlajamäki	Finland	4	3	7
