= Wrestling at the 1928 Summer Olympics – Men's Greco-Roman middleweight =

Men's middleweight Greco-Roman wrestling at the Games of the IX Olympiad
- Venue: Krachtsportgebouw
- Dates: August 2–5, 1928
- Competitors: 17 from 17 nations

Medalists
1st place, gold medalist(s)		Väinö Kokkinen	Finland
2nd place, silver medalist(s)		László Papp	Hungary
3rd place, bronze medalist(s)		Albert Kusnets	Estonia

The men's Greco-Roman middleweight was one of thirteen wrestling events held as part of the wrestling at the 1928 Summer Olympics programme. The competition was held from August 2 to 5, and featured 17 wrestlers from 17 nations. Middleweight was the third-heaviest category, including wrestlers weighing 67.5 to 75 kilograms (148.8 to 165.3 lb).

== Competition format ==
This Greco-Roman wrestling competition introduced an elimination system based on the accumulation of points. Each round featured all wrestlers pairing off and wrestling one bout (with one wrestler having a bye if there were an odd number). The loser received 3 points. The winner received 1 point if the win was by decision and 0 points if the win was by fall. At the end of each round, any wrestler with at least 5 points was eliminated.

== Results ==
=== Round 1 ===
The first round produced 4 winners by fall (0 points), 1 bye (0 points), 4 winners by decision (1 point), and 8 losers (3 points).

Bouts

Winner	Nation	Victory Type	Loser	Nation
Ivar Johansson	Sweden	Fall	Émile Frantz	Luxembourg
László Papp	Hungary	Decision	František Hála	Czechoslovakia
Jean Saenen	Belgium	Decision	Émile Poilvé	France
Franjo Palković	Yugoslavia	Fall	Simon Balkema	Netherlands
Enrico Bonassin	Italy	Fall	Alfred Larsen	Norway
Albert Kusnets	Estonia	Decision	Hermann Simon	Germany
Johannes Jacobsen	Denmark	Fall	Nurettin Baytorun	Turkey
Otto Frei	Switzerland	Decision	Antonio Walzer	Argentina
Väinö Kokkinen	Finland	Bye	N/A	N/A

Points

Rank	Wrestler	Nation	R1
1	Enrico Bonassin	Italy	0
1	Johannes Jacobsen	Denmark	0
1	Ivar Johansson	Sweden	0
1	Väinö Kokkinen	Finland	0
1	Franjo Palković	Yugoslavia	0
6	Otto Frei	Switzerland	1
6	Albert Kusnets	Estonia	1
6	László Papp	Hungary	1
6	Jean Saenen	Belgium	1
10	Simon Balkema	Netherlands	3
10	Nurettin Baytorun	Turkey	3
10	Émile Frantz	Luxembourg	3
10	František Hála	Czechoslovakia	3
10	Alfred Larsen	Norway	3
10	Émile Poilvé	France	3
10	Hermann Simon	Germany	3
10	Antonio Walzer	Argentina	3

=== Round 2 ===
Jacobsen (second win by fall) and Kokkinen (bye, win by fall) stayed at 0 points. Four men finished the second round at 2–0 with one win by fall and one by decision for 1 point apiece. Five more were 1–1 with either 3 or 4 points depending on how the win was achieved. Walzer had 3 points after a loss and a bye. Five wrestlers were 0–2 and were eliminated.

Bouts

Winner	Nation	Victory Type	Loser	Nation
Väinö Kokkinen	Finland	Fall	Ivar Johansson	Sweden
František Hála	Czechoslovakia	Fall	Émile Frantz	Luxembourg
László Papp	Hungary	Fall	Émile Poilvé	France
Jean Saenen	Belgium	Fall	Simon Balkema	Netherlands
Enrico Bonassin	Italy	Decision	Franjo Palković	Yugoslavia
Albert Kusnets	Estonia	Fall	Alfred Larsen	Norway
Nurettin Baytorun	Turkey	Decision	Hermann Simon	Germany
Johannes Jacobsen	Denmark	Fall	Otto Frei	Switzerland
Antonio Walzer	Argentina	Bye	N/A	N/A

Points

Rank	Wrestler	Nation	R1	R2	Total
1	Johannes Jacobsen	Denmark	0	0	0
1	Väinö Kokkinen	Finland	0	0	0
3	Enrico Bonassin	Italy	0	1	1
3	Albert Kusnets	Estonia	1	0	1
3	László Papp	Hungary	1	0	1
3	Jean Saenen	Belgium	1	0	1
7	František Hála	Czechoslovakia	3	0	3
7	Ivar Johansson	Sweden	0	3	3
7	Franjo Palković	Yugoslavia	0	3	3
7	Antonio Walzer	Argentina	3	0	3
11	Nurettin Baytorun	Turkey	3	1	4
11	Otto Frei	Switzerland	1	3	4
13	Émile Frantz	Luxembourg	3	3	6
13	Émile Poilvé	France	3	3	6
13	Simon Balkema	Netherlands	3	3	6
13	Alfred Larsen	Norway	3	3	6
13	Hermann Simon	Germany	3	3	6

=== Round 3 ===
All 6 bouts in round 3 were won by fall, so the winners remained at the same point totals: Jacobsen and Kokkinen at 0, Kusnets and Papp at 1, Hála at 3, and Baytorun at 4. Two of the losers—Bonassin and Saenen—reached only 4 points and continued in competition. The other 4 losers were eliminated.

Bouts

Winner	Nation	Victory Type	Loser	Nation
Väinö Kokkinen	Finland	Fall	Antonio Walzer	Argentina
František Hála	Czechoslovakia	Fall	Ivar Johansson	Sweden
László Papp	Hungary	Fall	Jean Saenen	Belgium
Albert Kusnets	Estonia	Fall	Franjo Palković	Yugoslavia
Johannes Jacobsen	Denmark	Fall	Enrico Bonassin	Italy
Nurettin Baytorun	Turkey	Fall	Otto Frei	Switzerland

Points

Rank	Wrestler	Nation	R1	R2	R3	Total
1	Johannes Jacobsen	Denmark	0	0	0	0
1	Väinö Kokkinen	Finland	0	0	0	0
3	Albert Kusnets	Estonia	1	0	0	1
3	László Papp	Hungary	1	0	0	1
5	František Hála	Czechoslovakia	3	0	0	3
6	Nurettin Baytorun	Turkey	3	1	0	4
6	Enrico Bonassin	Italy	0	1	3	4
6	Jean Saenen	Belgium	1	0	3	4
9	Ivar Johansson	Sweden	0	3	3	6
9	Franjo Palković	Yugoslavia	0	3	3	6
9	Antonio Walzer	Argentina	3	0	3	6
12	Otto Frei	Switzerland	1	3	3	7

=== Round 4 ===
Jacobsen had his first loss, but only went to 3 points and continued in competition. The other three losers were eliminated. Kokkinen was the only man left with 0 points. Each of the 5 remaining wrestlers had a different point total, 0 through 4.

Bouts

Winner	Nation	Victory Type	Loser	Nation
Väinö Kokkinen	Finland	Fall	František Hála	Czechoslovakia
László Papp	Hungary	Fall	Enrico Bonassin	Italy
Jean Saenen	Belgium	Fall	Nurettin Baytorun	Turkey
Albert Kusnets	Estonia	Decision	Johannes Jacobsen	Denmark

Points

Rank	Wrestler	Nation	R1	R2	R3	R4	Total
1	Väinö Kokkinen	Finland	0	0	0	0	0
2	László Papp	Hungary	1	0	0	0	1
3	Albert Kusnets	Estonia	1	0	0	1	2
4	Johannes Jacobsen	Denmark	0	0	0	3	3
5	Jean Saenen	Belgium	1	0	3	0	4
6	František Hála	Czechoslovakia	3	0	0	3	6
7	Nurettin Baytorun	Turkey	3	1	0	3	6
8	Enrico Bonassin	Italy	0	1	3	3	7

=== Round 5 ===
With Jacobsen on a bye, and Kokkinen (at 0 points) and Papp (at 1 point) facing each other in a no-elimination-possible match, the only man that would be eliminated in round 5 was the loser of the Kusnets vs. Saenen bout. Kusnets won, so Saenen was eliminated.

Bouts

Winner	Nation	Victory Type	Loser	Nation
Väinö Kokkinen	Finland	Fall	László Papp	Hungary
Albert Kusnets	Estonia	Fall	Jean Saenen	Belgium
Johannes Jacobsen	Denmark	Bye	N/A	N/A

Points

Rank	Wrestler	Nation	R1	R2	R3	R4	R5	Total
1	Väinö Kokkinen	Finland	0	0	0	0	0	0
2	Albert Kusnets	Estonia	1	0	0	1	0	2
3	Johannes Jacobsen	Denmark	0	0	0	3	0	3
4	László Papp	Hungary	1	0	0	0	3	4
5	Jean Saenen	Belgium	1	0	3	0	3	7

=== Round 6 ===
In contrast to the previous round which eliminated only 1 of 5 wrestlers, round 6 eliminated 3 of the remaining 4. Kokkinen beat Jacobsen to eliminate the latter man, who finished in 4th place. The Papp vs. Kusnets match ended in mutual elimination because Papp won by decision; both men finished with 5 points, but Papp had the head-to-head tie-breaker because of this win and received the silver medal. Kokkinen, who never received a point in the tournament (a bye and 4 wins by fall), won the gold medal as the last man remaining.

Bouts

Winner	Nation	Victory Type	Loser	Nation
Väinö Kokkinen	Finland	Fall	Johannes Jacobsen	Denmark
László Papp	Hungary	Decision	Albert Kusnets	Estonia

Points

Rank	Wrestler	Nation	R1	R2	R3	R4	R5	R6	Total
1st place, gold medalist(s)	Väinö Kokkinen	Finland	0	0	0	0	0	0	0
2nd place, silver medalist(s)	László Papp	Hungary	1	0	0	0	3	1	5
3rd place, bronze medalist(s)	Albert Kusnets	Estonia	1	0	0	1	0	3	5
4	Johannes Jacobsen	Denmark	0	0	0	3	0	3	6
