= Wrestling at the 1928 Summer Olympics – Men's Greco-Roman featherweight =

Men's featherweight Greco-Roman wrestling at the Games of the IX Olympiad
- Venue: Krachtsportgebouw
- Dates: August 2–5, 1928
- Competitors: 20 from 20 nations

Medalists
1st place, gold medalist(s)		Voldemar Väli	Estonia
2nd place, silver medalist(s)		Erik Malmberg	Sweden
3rd place, bronze medalist(s)		Gerolamo Quaglia	Italy

The men's Greco-Roman featherweight was one of thirteen wrestling events held as part of the wrestling at the 1928 Summer Olympics programme. The competition was held from August 2 to 5, and featured 20 wrestlers from 20 nations. Featherweight was the second-lightest category, including wrestlers weighing 58 to 62 kilograms (128 to 137 lb).

== Competition format ==
This Greco-Roman wrestling competition introduced an elimination system based on the accumulation of points. Each round featured all wrestlers pairing off and wrestling one bout (with one wrestler having a bye if there were an odd number). The loser received 3 points. The winner received 1 point if the win was by decision and 0 points if the win was by fall. At the end of each round, any wrestler with at least 5 points was eliminated.

== Results ==
=== Round 1 ===
The first round produced 7 winners by fall (0 points), 3 winners by decision (1 point), and 10 losers (3 points). Milovančev withdrew after his bout.

Bouts

Winner	Nation	Victory Type	Loser	Nation
Saim Arıkan	Turkey	Fall	Iso Milovančev	Yugoslavia
Károly Kárpáti	Hungary	Fall	Ali Kamel	Egypt
Voldemar Väli	Estonia	Decision	Ludwig Schlanger	Austria
František Kratochvíl	Czechoslovakia	Decision	Martin Egeberg	Norway
Jacques Dillen	Belgium	Decision	Aage Meyer	Denmark
Ernst Steinig	Germany	Fall	Leon Mazurek	Poland
Ricardo Rey	Argentina	Fall	Isidor Bieri	Switzerland
Erik Malmberg	Sweden	Fall	Roger Mollet	France
Aleksanteri Toivola	Finland	Fall	Johannes Nolten Jr.	Netherlands
Gerolamo Quaglia	Italy	Fall	Benjamin Araújo	Portugal

Points

Rank	Wrestler	Nation	R1
1	Saim Arıkan	Turkey	0
1	Károly Kárpáti	Hungary	0
1	Erik Malmberg	Sweden	0
1	Gerolamo Quaglia	Italy	0
1	Ricardo Rey	Argentina	0
1	Ernst Steinig	Germany	0
1	Aleksanteri Toivola	Finland	0
8	Jacques Dillen	Belgium	1
8	František Kratochvíl	Czechoslovakia	1
8	Voldemar Väli	Estonia	1
11	Benjamin Araújo	Portugal	3
11	Isidor Bieri	Switzerland	3
11	Martin Egeberg	Norway	3
11	Ali Kamel	Egypt	3
11	Leon Mazurek	Poland	3
11	Aage Meyer	Denmark	3
11	Roger Mollet	France	3
11	Johannes Nolten Jr.	Netherlands	3
11	Ludwig Schlanger	Austria	3
20	Iso Milovančev	Yugoslavia	3*

=== Round 2 ===
Eight of the nine bouts were determined by fall. Five men stayed at 0 points, each having won both his bouts by fall. Two others were 2–0 after this round: Väli with 1 point and Dillen with 2 points. Five men were at 3 points (4 after a 1–1 start with win by fall and one at 0–1 with a bye). Kratochvíl had the distinction of being the remaining man with the highest point total, at 4. Six men were 0–2 and were eliminated.

Bouts

Winner	Nation	Victory Type	Loser	Nation
Ali Kamel	Egypt	Fall	Saim Arıkan	Turkey
Károly Kárpáti	Hungary	Fall	Ludwig Schlanger	Austria
Voldemar Väli	Estonia	Fall	František Kratochvíl	Czechoslovakia
Jacques Dillen	Belgium	Decision	Martin Egeberg	Norway
Aage Meyer	Denmark	Fall	Leon Mazurek	Poland
Ernst Steinig	Germany	Fall	Ricardo Rey	Argentina
Erik Malmberg	Sweden	Fall	Isidor Bieri	Switzerland
Aleksanteri Toivola	Finland	Fall	Roger Mollet	France
Gerolamo Quaglia	Italy	Fall	Johannes Nolten Jr.	Netherlands
Benjamin Araújo	Portugal	Bye	N/A	N/A

Points

Rank	Wrestler	Nation	R1	R2	Total
1	Károly Kárpáti	Hungary	0	0	0
1	Erik Malmberg	Sweden	0	0	0
1	Gerolamo Quaglia	Italy	0	0	0
1	Ernst Steinig	Germany	0	0	0
1	Aleksanteri Toivola	Finland	0	0	0
6	Voldemar Väli	Estonia	1	0	1
7	Jacques Dillen	Belgium	1	1	2
8	Benjamin Araújo	Portugal	3	0	3
8	Saim Arıkan	Turkey	0	3	3
8	Ali Kamel	Egypt	3	0	'3
8	Aage Meyer	Denmark	3	0	3
8	Ricardo Rey	Argentina	0	3	3
13	František Kratochvíl	Czechoslovakia	1	3	4
14	Isidor Bieri	Switzerland	3	3	6
14	Martin Egeberg	Norway	3	3	6
14	Leon Mazurek	Poland	3	3	6
14	Roger Mollet	France	3	3	6
14	Johannes Nolten Jr.	Netherlands	3	3	6
14	Ludwig Schlanger	Austria	3	3	6

=== Round 3 ===
Of the five men who started the round with 0 points, only 1 finished it with that many: Quaglia, who had a bye. Kárpáti, Malmberg, and Steinig each won by decision, gaining their 1st point. Toivola lost. Väli stayed at 1 point, winning by fall. Dillen's first loss eliminated him, at 5 points after two wins by decision. Arıkan and Meyer won to stay in contention, each by fall to stay at 3 points. The other four men (Rey, Araujo, Kamel, and Dillen) who had a loss before this round lost again and were eliminated.

Bouts

Winner	Nation	Victory Type	Loser	Nation
Saim Arıkan	Turkey	Fall	Benjamin Araújo	Portugal
Voldemar Väli	Estonia	Fall	Ali Kamel	Egypt
Erik Malmberg	Sweden	Decision	Aleksanteri Toivola	Finland
Károly Kárpáti	Hungary	Decision	František Kratochvíl	Czechoslovakia
Ernst Steinig	Germany	Decision	Jacques Dillen	Belgium
Aage Meyer	Denmark	Fall	Ricardo Rey	Argentina
Gerolamo Quaglia	Italy	Bye	N/A	N/A

Points

Rank	Wrestler	Nation	R1	R2	R3	Total
1	Gerolamo Quaglia	Italy	0	0	0	0
2	Károly Kárpáti	Hungary	0	0	1	1
2	Erik Malmberg	Sweden	0	0	1	1
2	Ernst Steinig	Germany	0	0	1	1
2	Voldemar Väli	Estonia	1	0	0	1
6	Saim Arıkan	Turkey	0	3	0	3
6	Aage Meyer	Denmark	3	0	0	3
6	Aleksanteri Toivola	Finland	0	0	3	3
9	Jacques Dillen	Belgium	1	1	3	5
10	Benjamin Araújo	Portugal	3	0	3	6
10	Ali Kamel	Egypt	3	0	3	6
10	Ricardo Rey	Argentina	0	3	3	6
13	František Kratochvíl	Czechoslovakia	1	3	3	7

=== Round 4 ===
Quaglia won his third bout by fall; along with his 3rd round bye, he stayed at 0 points. Väli also won a third bout by fall, making him 4–0 with 1 point as the other win came by decision. Malmberg and Steinig each picked up their 2nd point by winning by decision again, making them vulnerable to elimination upon any future loss. Kárpáti took his first loss, moving to 4 points. All three of the men who started the round with a prior loss lost again and were eliminated.

Bouts

Winner	Nation	Victory Type	Loser	Nation
Gerolamo Quaglia	Italy	Fall	Saim Arıkan	Turkey
Voldemar Väli	Estonia	Fall	Károly Kárpáti	Hungary
Erik Malmberg	Sweden	Decision	Aage Meyer	Denmark
Ernst Steinig	Germany	Decision	Aleksanteri Toivola	Finland

Points

Rank	Wrestler	Nation	R1	R2	R3	R4	Total
1	Gerolamo Quaglia	Italy	0	0	0	0	0
2	Voldemar Väli	Estonia	1	0	0	0	1
3	Erik Malmberg	Sweden	0	0	1	1	2
3	Ernst Steinig	Germany	0	0	1	1	2
5	Károly Kárpáti	Hungary	0	0	1	3	4
6	Saim Arıkan	Turkey	0	3	0	3	6
6	Aage Meyer	Denmark	3	0	0	3	6
6	Aleksanteri Toivola	Finland	0	0	3	3	6

=== Round 5 ===
Malmberg received a bye in this round, staying at 2 points. Kárpáti defeated Quaglia, but the bad points system led to the winner (who moved from 4 points to 5) being eliminated while the loser (from 0 points to 3) was not. Väli pinned Steinig to take the lead (at 1 point) and eliminate the latter wrestler.

Bouts

Winner	Nation	Victory Type	Loser	Nation
Károly Kárpáti	Hungary	Decision	Gerolamo Quaglia	Italy
Voldemar Väli	Estonia	Fall	Ernst Steinig	Germany
Erik Malmberg	Sweden	Bye	N/A	N/A

Points

Rank	Wrestler	Nation	R1	R2	R3	R4	R5	Total
1	Voldemar Väli	Estonia	1	0	0	0	0	1
2	Erik Malmberg	Sweden	0	0	1	1	0	2
3	Gerolamo Quaglia	Italy	0	0	0	0	3	3
4	Károly Kárpáti	Hungary	0	0	1	3	1	5
5	Ernst Steinig	Germany	0	0	1	1	3	5

=== Round 6 ===
Väli was the only remaining wrestler who had not yet had a bye, so he got one in this round. Malmberg pinned Quaglia, staying in contention and eliminating the Italian with a bronze medal finish.

Bouts

Winner	Nation	Victory Type	Loser	Nation
Erik Malmberg	Sweden	Fall	Gerolamo Quaglia	Italy
Voldemar Väli	Estonia	Bye	N/A	N/A

Points

Rank	Wrestler	Nation	R1	R2	R3	R4	R5	R6	Total
1	Voldemar Väli	Estonia	1	0	0	0	0	0	1
2	Erik Malmberg	Sweden	0	0	1	1	0	0	2
3rd place, bronze medalist(s)	Gerolamo Quaglia	Italy	0	0	0	0	3	3	6

=== Round 7 ===
Round 7 was effectively a gold medal match. Väli pinned Malmberg.

Bouts

Winner	Nation	Victory Type	Loser	Nation
Voldemar Väli	Estonia	Fall	Erik Malmberg	Sweden

Points

Rank	Wrestler	Nation	R1	R2	R3	R4	R5	R6	R7	Total
1st place, gold medalist(s)	Voldemar Väli	Estonia	1	0	0	0	0	0	0	1
2nd place, silver medalist(s)	Erik Malmberg	Sweden	0	0	1	1	0	0	3	5
