= Wrestling at the 1928 Summer Olympics – Men's freestyle middleweight =

Men's middleweight freestyle wrestling at the Games of the IX Olympiad
- Venue: Krachtsportgebouw
- Dates: July 30–August 1, 1928
- Competitors: 9 from 9 nations

Medalists
| 1st place, gold medalist(s) | | Ernst Kyburz | Switzerland |
| 2nd place, silver medalist(s) | | Donald Stockton | Canada |
| 3rd place, bronze medalist(s) | | Samuel Rabin | Great Britain |

The men's freestyle middleweight was a freestyle wrestling event held as part of the Wrestling at the 1928 Summer Olympics programme. It was the fourth appearance of the event. Middleweight was the third-heaviest category, including wrestlers weighing up to 79 kilograms.

== Results ==
Source: Official results; Wudarski

=== Gold medal round ===
Round of 16
Ernst Kyburz (SUI) | W
Thomas Bolger (AUS) | L

Quarterfinals
Ernst Kyburz (SUI) | W
Anton Praeg (RSA) | L
Donald Stockton (CAN) | W
Samuel Rabin (GBR) | L
Ralph Hammonds (USA) | W
Louis Van Der Herten (BEL) | L
Vilho Pekkala (FIN) | W
Henri Deniel (FRA) | L

Semifinals
Ernst Kyburz (SUI) | W
Donald Stockton (CAN) | L
Ralph Hammonds (USA) | W
Vilho Pekkala (FIN) | L

Final
Ernst Kyburz (SUI) | W
Ralph Hammonds (USA) | L

=== Silver medal round ===
| Semifinals | | Final |
| Anton Praeg (RSA) | W |
| Thomas Bolger (AUS) | L | Anton Praeg (RSA) | L |
| Donald Stockton (CAN) | W ^{1} | Donald Stockton (CAN) | W |
| Ralph Hammonds (USA) | L |

^{1} Stockton was declared the winner after Hammonds retired from the match due to injury.

=== Bronze medal round ===
As Hammonds and Praeg were both unable to compete after being injured in the silver medal round, Samuel Rabin was awarded the bronze medal.
