= Wrestling at the 1928 Summer Olympics – Men's freestyle welterweight =

Men's welterweight freestyle wrestling at the Games of the IX Olympiad
- Venue: Krachtsportgebouw
- Dates: July 30–August 1, 1928
- Competitors: 11 from 11 nations

Medalists
1st place, gold medalist(s)		Arvo Haavisto	Finland
2nd place, silver medalist(s)		Lloyd Appleton	United States
3rd place, bronze medalist(s)		Maurice Letchford	Canada

The men's freestyle welterweight was a freestyle wrestling event held as part of the Wrestling at the 1928 Summer Olympics programme. It was the third appearance of the event. Welterweight was the median category, including wrestlers weighing up to 72 kilograms. Arvo Haavisto, a 1924 bronze medalist in the lightweight category, won the tournament.

== Results ==
Source: Official results; Wudarski

=== Gold medal round ===
Round of 16
Lloyd Appleton (USA)	W
Robert Cook (GBR)	L
Alfred Praks (EST)	W
Theofilos Tomazos (GRE)	L
Hyacinthe Roosen (BEL)	W
Johannes Jacobsen (DEN)	L

Quarterfinals
Lloyd Appleton (USA)	W
Alfred Praks (EST)	L
Hyacinthe Roosen (BEL)	L
Maurice Letchford (CAN)	W
Jean Jourlin (FRA)	W
Fritz Käsermann (SUI)	L
Arvo Haavisto (FIN)	W
Harry Morris (AUS)	L

Semifinals
Lloyd Appleton (USA)	W
Maurice Letchford (CAN)	L
Jean Jourlin (FRA)	L
Arvo Haavisto (FIN)	W

Final
Lloyd Appleton (USA)	L
Arvo Haavisto (FIN)	W

=== Silver medal round ===
Semifinals		Final
Lloyd Appleton (USA)	W
Jean Jourlin (FRA)	L	Lloyd Appleton (USA)	W
		Harry Morris (AUS)	L

=== Bronze medal round ===
Semifinals		Final
Maurice Letchford (CAN)	W
Robert H Cook (GBR)	L	Maurice Letchford (CAN)	W
Jean Jourlin (FRA)	W	Jean Jourlin (FRA)	L
Harry Morris (AUS)	L
