= Wrestling at the 1928 Summer Olympics – Men's freestyle featherweight =

Men's featherweight freestyle wrestling at the Games of the IX Olympiad
- Venue: Krachtsportgebouw
- Dates: July 30–August 1, 1928
- Competitors: 9 from 9 nations

Medalists
1st place, gold medalist(s)		Allie Morrison	United States
2nd place, silver medalist(s)		Kustaa Pihlajamäki	Finland
3rd place, bronze medalist(s)		Hans Minder	Switzerland

The men's freestyle featherweight was a freestyle wrestling event held as part of the Wrestling at the 1928 Summer Olympics programme. It was the fifth appearance of the event. Featherweight was the second-lightest category, including wrestlers weighing up to 61 kilograms. Kustaa Pihlajamäki, who had won gold in the lighter bantamweight class in 1924, took silver.

== Results ==
Source: Official results; Wudarski

=== Gold medal round ===
Round of 16
Harold Angus (GBR)	W
Eduard Pütsep (EST)	L

Quarterfinals
Harold Angus (GBR)	L
Daniel MacDonald (CAN)	W
Hans Minder (SUI)	W
Arthur Nord (NOR)	L
Allie Morrison (USA)	W
Pierre Bressinck (BEL)	L
Kustaa Pihlajamäki (FIN)	W
René Rottenfluc (FRA)	L

Semifinals
Daniel MacDonald (CAN)	L
Hans Minder (SUI)	W
Allie Morrison (USA)	W
Kustaa Pihlajamäki (FIN)	L

Final
Hans Minder (SUI)	L
Allie Morrison (USA)	W

=== Silver medal round ===
Semifinals		Final
Hans Minder (SUI)	W
Petrus Bressinck (BEL)	L	Hans Minder (SUI)	L
		Kustaa Pihlajamäki (FIN)	W

=== Bronze medal round ===
As Rottenfluc was injured, the single match was scratched and Minder was awarded the bronze medal.

Semifinals	Final
	Hans Minder (SUI)	W
	René Rottenfluc (FRA)	L
