= Wrestling at the 1928 Summer Olympics – Men's freestyle lightweight =

Men's lightweight freestyle wrestling at the Games of the IX Olympiad
- Venue: Krachtsportgebouw
- Dates: July 30–August 1, 1928
- Competitors: 11 from 11 nations

Medalists
1st place, gold medalist(s)		Osvald Käpp	Estonia
2nd place, silver medalist(s)		Charles Pacôme	France
3rd place, bronze medalist(s)		Eino Leino	Finland

The men's freestyle lightweight was a freestyle wrestling event held as part of the Wrestling at the 1928 Summer Olympics programme. It was the fifth appearance of the event. Lightweight was the third-lightest category, including wrestlers weighing up to 65 kilograms. Eino Leino won his third Olympic medal, a bronze to go with his 1920 middleweight gold and 1924 welterweight silver.

== Results ==
Source: Official results; Wudarski

=== Gold medal round ===
Round of 16
Clarence Berryman (USA)	W
Algot Malmberg (SWE)	L
Osvald Käpp (EST)	W
Carlo Jørgensen (DEN)	L
Eino Leino (FIN)	W
George MacKenzie (GBR)	L

Quarterfinals
Clarence Berryman (USA)	L
Osvald Käpp (EST)	W
Eino Leino (FIN)	L
Charles Pacôme (FRA)	W
Birgir Nilsen (NOR)	W
Jean Smet (BEL)	L
Hans Mollet (SUI)	W
Isuke Shinmen (JPN)	L

Semifinals
Osvald Käpp (EST)	W
Charles Pacôme (FRA)	L
Birgir Nilsen (NOR)	W
Hans Mollet (SUI)	L

Final
Osvald Käpp (EST)	W
Birgir Nilsen (NOR)	L

=== Silver medal round ===
Semifinals		Final
Carlo Jørgensen (DEN)	W
Clarence Berryman (USA)	L	Carlo Jørgensen (DEN)	L
Charles Pacôme (FRA)	W	Charles Pacôme (FRA)	W
Birgir Nilsen (NOR)	L

=== Bronze medal round ===
Semifinals	Final
	Eino Leino (FIN)	W
	Birgir Nilsen (NOR)	L
