= Robert Cook (wrestler) =

British wrestler (1905–1963)

Personal information
- Nationality: British (English)
- Born: 3 October 1905 Islington, London, England
- Died: 1963 (aged 57–58) Stoke Newington, London, England

Sport
- Sport: Wrestling

Robert Herbert Cook (3 October 1905 – 1963) was a British wrestler. He competed in the men's freestyle welterweight category at the 1928 Summer Olympics, where he finished in fifth place. He lost on points to eventual Silver medal winner Lloyd Appleton (U.S.A) in the opening round, then went on to meet Maurice Letchford (Canada) in the bronze medal round, again losing on points.

Cook was the British champion after winning the 1927 lightweight title at the British Wrestling Championships.
