= Charles Delporte =

Charles Delporte may refer to:

- Charles Delporte (fencer) (1893–1960), Belgian fencer and Olympic champion
- Charles Delporte (artist) (1928–2012), Belgian painter and sculptor
- Charles Delporte (wrestler) (1914–1940), French Olympic wrestler
