= Johannes Nolten =

Johannes Nolten can refer to:

- Johannes Nolten Sr. (1888–1944), Dutch Olympic wrestler
- Johannes Nolten Jr. (1908–1974), Dutch Olympic wrestler, and son of the above
