= Alfred Larsen =

Alfred Larsen may refer to:

- Alfred Larsen (sailor), Norwegian businessman and sailor
- Alfred Larsen (wrestler), Norwegian sport wrestler

== See also ==
- Alfred Sinding-Larsen, Norwegian civil servant, journalist and writer
- Alf Larsen, Norwegian poet, essayist and magazine editor
