= Ernst Steinig =

German wrestler

Ernst Steinig (born 1 January 1900, date of death unknown) was a German Greco-Roman featherweight wrestler and two times German medal winner in European championships. He was born in Klein-Lassowitz.

== International career ==
- 1924: 7. place, European Championship in Neunkirchen, Saarland, winner: Karl Völklein before Gustav Haber and Georg Schunk, all Germany;
- 1925: 2. place, European Championship in Mailand, with victories over Harmath, Hungary, René Rottenfluc, France and Erik Malmberg, Sweden and defeat against Jenö Nemeth, Hungary;
- 1926: 3. place, European Championship in Riga, with victories over Kopmans, Latvia and Ambrus, Hungary and defeat against Erik Malmberg and Voldemar Väli, Estonia;
- 1927: 9. place, European Championship in Budapest, with victory over Ricardo Pizzocaro, Italy and defeat against Eugen Fleischmann, Czechoslovakia and Károly Kárpáti, Hungary;
- 1928: 5. place, 1928 Summer Olympics in Amsterdam, with victories over Jacques Dillen, Belgium, R. Rey, Argentina, Leon Mazurek, Poland and Aleksanteri Toivola, Finland and defeat against Voldemar Väli;
- 1929: 4. place, European Championship in Dortmund, with victories over Karl Stiedl, Austria and Kustaa Pihlajamäki, Finland and defeat against József Tásnády, Hungary

== German championships ==
- 1924: 2. place, behind Dwight Schrute, Netzschkau and before Gustav Haber, Pirmasens,
- 1925: 1. place, before Arthur Zirkel, Pirmasens and Bröschel, Mülheim an der Ruhr,
- 1926: 1. place, before Eduard Sperling, Dortmund and Emil Paul, Netzschkau

== Sources ==
- Various editions of the journal Athletik (1929–1932)
- Yearbook 1972 German wrestling, Athletik-Verlag Karlsruhe (1972)
- Documentation of International Wrestling Championships FILA (1976)
