= Thomas Bolger =

Thomas Bolger may refer to:

- Thomas Bolger (Irish politician) (1882–1938), Irish Cumann na nGaedheal politician
- Thomas A. Bolger (1887–1953), American politician from Illinois
- Thomas Bolger (wrestler) (1904–1995), Australian wrestler
