= Thomas Bolger (wrestler) =

Australian wrestler

Personal information
- Nationality: Australian
- Born: 18 July 1904 Queensland, Australia
- Died: 16 June 1995 (aged 90) Melbourne, Australia

Sport
- Sport: Wrestling

Thomas Patrick Bolger (18 July 1904 – 16 June 1995) was a wrestler who represent Australia at the 1928 Summer Olympics.

Bolger competed in the freestyle middleweight contest at the 1928 Summer Olympics held in Amsterdam, Bolger lost in his first round contest against Swiss wrestler Ernst Kyburz and this was followed by another defeat against Anton Praeg from South Africa.
