= Antonio Walzer =

Argentine wrestler (1909–?)

Personal information
- Nationality: Argentine
- Born: 1909

Sport
- Sport: Wrestling

Antonio Walzer (1909–?) was an Argentine wrestler. He competed in the men's Greco-Roman middleweight at the 1928 Summer Olympics.
