= Émile Frantz =

Luxembourgish wrestler

Personal information
- Nationality: Luxembourgish
- Born: 19 May 1910 Villerupt, France
- Died: 22 May 1996 (aged 86) Esch-sur-Alzette, Luxembourg

Sport
- Sport: Wrestling

Émile Frantz (19 May 1910 – 22 May 1996) was a Luxembourgish wrestler. He competed in the men's Greco-Roman middleweight at the 1928 Summer Olympics. During World War II, he was imprisoned in both the Natzweiler-Struthof and Dachau concentration camps.
