= Ralph Hammonds =

American wrestler (1906–1966)

Personal information
- Born: July 9, 1906 Lawton, Oklahoma, U.S.
- Died: May 5, 1966 (aged 59) Houston, Texas, U.S.

Sport
- Country: United States
- Sport: Wrestling
- Events: Freestyle and Folkstlye
- College team: Texas
- Team: USA
Medal record
Collegiate Wrestling
Representing the Texas Longhorns
NCAA Championships
Silver medal – second place	1928 Ames	175 lb

Ralph W. Hammonds (July 9, 1906 – May 5, 1966) was an American wrestler. He competed in the men's freestyle middleweight at the 1928 Summer Olympics. Hammonds wrestled collegiately at Texas, where he was an NCAA runner-up at the 1928 NCAA Wrestling Championships.

== Early life ==
Ralph W. Hammonds was the son of A. E. Hammonds Sr. and his wife. He had at least two brothers (J. Elmo and A. E. Hammonds Jr.) and one sister (Marguerite Hammonds).

In 1922, his family moved from Lawton, Oklahoma, to San Antonio in Texas. Hammonds studied at Oklahoma A&M College and joined the school's amateur wrestling team in the mid-1920s. He then transferred to the University of Texas where he competed in football, pole vaulting and wrestling. He became Southwest Conference champion in pole vaulting.

== Amateur wrestling career ==
Hammonds earned places on the U.S. team for the 1928 Summer Olympics as both a pole vaulter and wrestler, but opted to compete as the latter when made to choose.

== Wrestling promoter career ==
During the 1930s and 1940s, Hammonds worked as a promoter for professional wrestling.

== Personal life ==
Hammonds was found dead in his Houston apartment on May 5, 1966, after having a heart attack. His funeral was held two days later and he was buried in San Antonio's Mission Burial Park.
