= Leon Mazurek =

Polish wrestler

Personal information
- Nationality: Polish
- Born: 28 February 1906 Wirek, Austria-Hungary
- Died: 1 January 1940 (aged 33) Nowy Bytom, Poland

Sport
- Sport: Wrestling

Leon Mazurek (28 February 1906 – 1 January 1940) was a Polish wrestler. He competed in the men's Greco-Roman featherweight at the 1928 Summer Olympics.
