= Göte Melin =

Swedish wrestler

Personal information
- Nationality: Swedish
- Born: 26 July 1910 Kristinehamn, Sweden
- Died: 23 December 1991 (aged 81) Kristinehamn, Sweden

Sport
- Sport: Wrestling

Göte Melin (26 July 1910 – 23 December 1991) was a Swedish wrestler. He competed in the men's freestyle lightweight at the 1936 Summer Olympics.
