= Simon Balkema =

Dutch wrestler (1896–1971)

Personal information
- Nationality: Dutch
- Born: 8 November 1896 Amsterdam, Netherlands
- Died: 20 October 1971 (aged 74) Amsterdam, Netherlands

Sport
- Sport: Wrestling

Simon Balkema (8 November 1896 – 20 October 1971) was a Dutch wrestler. He competed in the men's Greco-Roman middleweight at the 1928 Summer Olympics.
