= Jean Smet =

Belgian wrestler

Personal information
- Nationality: Belgian

Sport
- Sport: Wrestling

Jean Smet was a Belgian wrestler. He competed in the men's freestyle lightweight at the 1928 Summer Olympics.
