= Pierre Bressinck =

Belgian wrestler

Personal information
- Nationality: Belgian
- Born: 22 May 1906
- Died: 26 January 1988 (aged 81)

Sport
- Sport: Wrestling

Pierre Bressinck (22 May 1906 – 26 January 1988) was a Belgian wrestler. He competed in the men's freestyle featherweight at the 1928 Summer Olympics.
