= Louis Van Der Herten =

Belgian wrestler

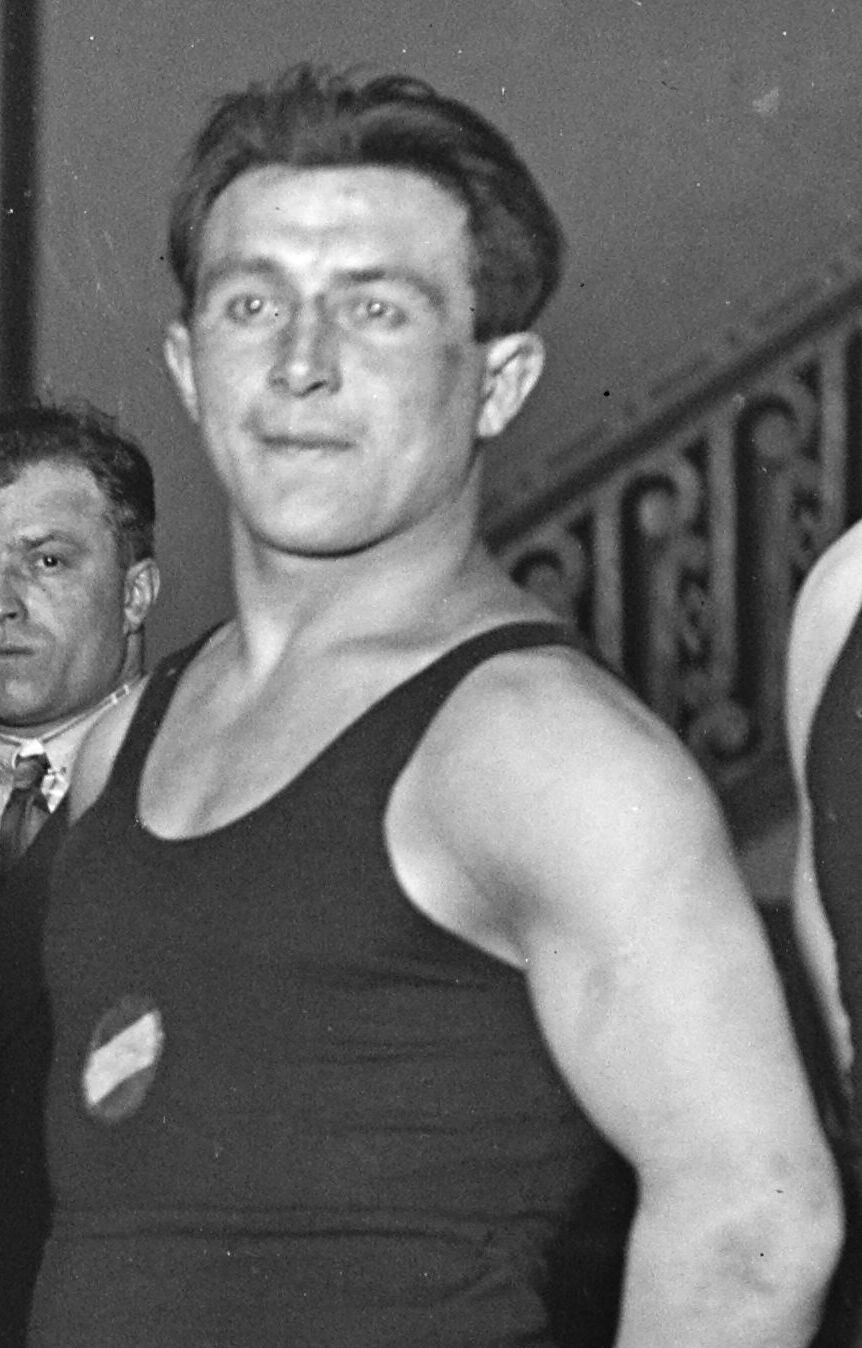
- Louis Van Der Herten in 1928

Personal information
- Nationality: Belgian

Sport
- Sport: Wrestling

Louis Van Der Herten (1904–1982) was a Belgian wrestler. He competed in the men's freestyle middleweight at the 1928 Summer Olympics.
