= Sadık Soğancı =

Turkish wrestler

Personal information
- Nationality: Turkish
- Born: 14 June 1911

Sport
- Sport: Wrestling

Sadık Soğancı (born 14 June 1911, date of death unknown) was a Turkish wrestler. He competed in the men's freestyle lightweight at the 1936 Summer Olympics.
