= Václav Brdek =

Czech wrestler

Personal information
- Nationality: Czech
- Born: 13 September 1913
- Died: 22 July 1973 (aged 59)

Sport
- Sport: Wrestling

Václav Brdek (13 September 1913 – 22 July 1973) was a Czech wrestler. He competed in the men's freestyle lightweight at the 1936 Summer Olympics.
