= Gottfried Arn =

Swiss wrestler

Personal information
- Nationality: Swiss
- Born: 24 November 1912
- Died: 10 August 2006 (aged 93) Collonge-Bellerive, Switzerland

Sport
- Sport: Wrestling

Gottfried Arn (24 November 1912 – 10 August 2006) was a Swiss wrestler. He competed in the men's freestyle lightweight at the 1936 Summer Olympics.
