= Jacques Van Assche =

Belgian wrestler

Personal information
- Nationality: Belgian

Sport
- Sport: Wrestling

Jacques Van Assche (4 August 1905 – 11 June 1972) was a Belgian wrestler. He competed in the men's freestyle light heavyweight at the 1928 Summer Olympics. He competed in a single-elimination format, reaching the semifinal rounds and finishing in fifth place.
