= Hervé Deniel =

French wrestler

Personal information
- Nationality: French

Sport
- Sport: Wrestling

Hervé Deniel (14 February 1899 – 11 December 1951) was a French wrestler. He competed in the men's freestyle middleweight at the 1928 Summer Olympics.
