= 1936 NCAA Wrestling Championships =

American collegiate wrestling tournament

Tournament information
- Sport: Wrestling
- Location: Lexington, Virginia
- Dates: March 20, 1936–March 21, 1936
- Host: Washington and Lee University
- Venue: Doremus Gymnasium
- Participants: 11

Final positions
- Champions: Oklahoma
- 1st runners-up: Central State (OK)
- 2nd runners-up: Oklahoma A&M
- MVP: Wayne Martin (Oklahoma)

The 1936 NCAA Wrestling Championships involved eleven teams to determine the National Collegiate Athletic Association (NCAA) college wrestling national champion, and each wrestler competed for individual championships. The 9th edition of the tournament began on March 20, 1936, and concluded on March 21. Washington and Lee University in Lexington, Virginia hosted the tournament at Doremus Gymnasium.

The Oklahoma Sooners ended the streak of eight consecutive team championships of their Bedlam rivals the Oklahoma A&M Cowboys to claim their first team title. Oklahoma A&M finished in a second place tie with the Central State Bronchos.

== Team standings ==
| Rank | School | Points |
|---|---|---|
| 1 | Oklahoma | 16 |
| T2 | Central State (OK) | 10 |
| T2 | Oklahoma A&M | 10 |
| T4 | Lehigh | 5 |
| T4 | Michigan State | 5 |
| 6 | Southwestern Oklahoma State | 4 |
| T7 | Cornell College (IA) | 3 |
| T7 | Indiana | 3 |
| 9 | Iowa | 2 |
| T10 | Michigan | 1 |
| T10 | Navy | 1 |

== Individual results ==
| Weight | Champion | School | Score | Runner-up | School |
|---|---|---|---|---|---|
| 123 | Ted Anderson | Central State (OK) | Dec | Willard Duffy | Indiana |
| 134 | Wayne Martin | Oklahoma | Fall 9:16 | Dale Brand | Cornell (IA) |
| 145 | Harley Strong | Oklahoma A&M | Dec | Karl Kitt | Southwestern Oklahoma |
| 158 | Walter Jacob | Michigan State | Dec | Bill Keas | Oklahoma |
| 174 | Harry Broadbent | Oklahoma | Dec | Ray Vogel | Navy |
| 191 | Ray Clemons | Central State (OK) | Fall 5:02 | Charles McDaniel | Indiana |
| UNL | Howell Scobey | Lehigh | Fall 2:18 | Hugo Bonino | Washington & Lee |
