= Benjamin Araújo =

Portuguese wrestler

Personal information
- Nationality: Portuguese
- Born: 24 March 1900 Moura, Portugal
- Died: 23 March 1978 (aged 77)

Sport
- Sport: Wrestling

Benjamin Araújo (24 March 1900 – 23 March 1978) was a Portuguese wrestler. He competed in the men's Greco-Roman featherweight at the 1928 Summer Olympics.
