= Isuke Shinmen =

Japanese wrestler (1889–1967)

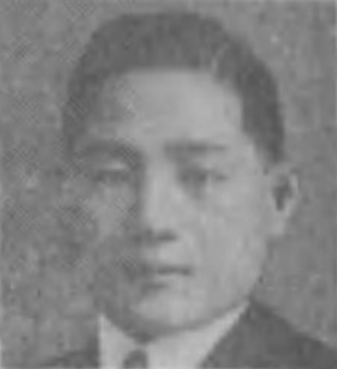

Personal information
- Nationality: Japanese
- Born: 23 October 1889 Fukuoka, Empire of Japan
- Died: 8 September 1967 (aged 77)

Sport
- Sport: Judo, wrestling

Isuke Shinmen (23 October 1889 – 8 September 1967) was a Japanese judoka and wrestler. He competed in the men's freestyle lightweight at the 1928 Summer Olympics.

== Biography ==
Initially a practitioner of Sōsuishi-ryū jujutsu, Shinmen joined the Kodokan judo school in 1907, training under Sanpo Toku. He became known by his fearsome tomoe nage, which he famously used to throw away the 130 kg 6th dan Shutaro Ohno as if he was a much lighter opponent. However, Shinmen was a specialist in chokeholds, and was famous his skill to get them in while standing and then complete them on the ground, especially after failing a throw. His favorite choke was okuri eri jime.
