= Eiichi Kazama =

Japanese wrestler

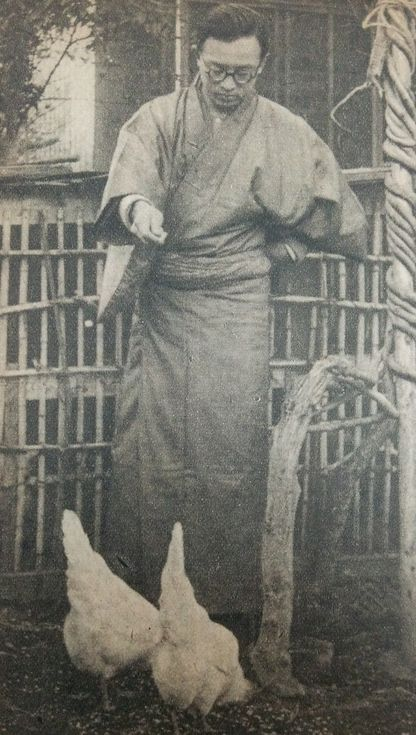
- Eiichi Kazama in 1948

Personal information
- Nationality: Japanese
- Born: 19 February 1916
- Died: 8 May 2001 (aged 85)

Sport
- Sport: Wrestling

Eiichi Kazama (風間 栄一, Kazama Eiichi; 19 February 1916 – 8 May 2001) was a Japanese wrestler. He competed in the men's freestyle lightweight at the 1936 Summer Olympics. He attended Waseda University and was captain of a team of Japanese college wrestlers who toured the United States in 1938 and 1939. He and other Japanese wrestlers toured in the United States again in 1951, giving exhibition wrestling matches at colleges.
