= Harold Angus (wrestler) =

British wrestler (1904–1940)

Personal information
- Nationality: British (English)
- Born: 10 November 1904 Wigan, England
- Died: 30 October 1940 (aged 35) Doncaster, England

Sport
- Sport: Wrestling
Medal record
Men's freestyle wrestling
Representing England
British Empire Games
Silver medal – second place	1930 Hamilton	Lightweight

Harold Angus (10 November 1904 – 30 October 1940) was a British wrestler. He competed in the men's freestyle featherweight at the 1928 Summer Olympics.

== Biography ==
Angus competed in the lightweight category at the 1930 British Empire Games for England, losing the gold medal match against Canadian Howard Thomas.

He was an insurance inspector at the time of the 1930 Games and lived in Doncaster. He died following a shooting accident in October 1940.

Angus won the British Wrestling Championships in 1928.
