= Paride Romagnoli =

Italian wrestler

Personal information
- Nationality: Italian
- Born: 20 March 1909 Giubiasco, Switzerland
- Died: 10 August 1992 (aged 83)

Sport
- Sport: Wrestling

Paride Romagnoli (20 March 1909 – 10 August 1992) was an Italian wrestler. He competed in the men's freestyle lightweight at the 1936 Summer Olympics.
