= Doc Strong =

American wrestler (1916–1952)

Personal information
- Full name: Harley de Witt Strong
- Born: November 10, 1916 Kendrick, Oklahoma, U.S.
- Died: July 4, 1952 (aged 35) Norman, Oklahoma, U.S.

Sport
- Country: United States
- Sport: Wrestling
- Events: Freestyle and Folkstyle
- College team: Oklahoma A&M
- Team: USA
- Coached by: Edward C. Gallagher
Medal record
Collegiate Wrestling
Representing Oklahoma A&M
NCAA Championships
| Gold medal – first place | 1936 Lexington | 145 lb |

Harley de Witt "Doc" Strong (November 10, 1916 – July 4, 1952) was an American wrestler. He competed in the men's freestyle lightweight at the 1936 Summer Olympics. In 1952, he was arrested for public drunkenness, and shortly after being locked up, hanged himself with his belt wrapped around a cell bar.
