= Nuri Boytorun =

Turkish wrestler (1908–1988)

Personal information
- Full name: Nurettin Boytorun
- Born: 28 March 1908 Istanbul, Ottoman Empire
- Died: 28 November 1988 (aged 80) Istanbul, Turkey
Medal record
Men's Greco-Roman wrestling
Representing Turkey
Balkan Championships
Gold medal – first place	1932	Middleweight
Gold medal – first place	1933	Middleweight
Gold medal – first place	1934	Middleweight
Gold medal – first place	1935	Middleweight

Nurettin "Nuri" Boytorun (28 March 1908 – 28 November 1988) was a Turkish Olympian sport wrestler, trainer and technical director. He competed in the Middleweight division of Greco-Roman category at the 1928 and 1936 Summer Olympics.

He was born in Istanbul, Ottoman Empire. He was the Balkan champion four times in a row.

After retiring from active sports, he served as the trainer of the Turkish national team. Nuri Boytorun instructed wrestlers such as Yaşar Doğu, Celal Atik, Gazanfer Bilge and Ahmet Kireççi, among others. He was technical director of the national team, which participated at the Olympics in 1948, 1952 and 1956.

Accepting an offer, he emigrated to Italy, and served as the technical director of the Italian national Greco-Roman wrestling team.

Boytorun died on November 28, 1988, in Istanbul. He was succeeded by his wife Süheyla and two sons Sinan and Hamdi.
