= Heywood L. Edwards =

United States Navy officer and wrestler

Heywood Lane Edwards (9 November 1905 – 31 October 1941) was an officer of the United States Navy. Born in San Saba, Texas, he was the son of Winston C Edwards and Louise Smith. He was one of the first American casualties of World War II, more than a month before the Japanese attack on Pearl Harbor.

== Biography ==
Edwards was born in San Saba, Tex., 9 November 1905 and graduated from the United States Naval Academy in 1926. He competed for the United States in freestyle wrestling in the 1928 Summer Olympics, earning 4th place in the light heavyweight division. After serving in battleship Florida (BB-30), destroyer Reno (DD-303) and other ships, he underwent submarine instruction in 1931, served in several submarines, and was assigned to cruiser Detroit (CL-8) in 1935.

Lieutenant Commander Edwards assumed command of Reuben James (DD-245) 6 April 1940. His ship became the first in the U.S. Navy to be sunk in the Battle of the Atlantic when it was torpedoed by a German submarine while on convoy duty west of Iceland 30–31 October 1941. Lt. Comdr. Edwards and 99 of his crew perished with the ship.

== Namesake ==
In 1943, the destroyer USS Heywood L. Edwards (DD-663) was named in his honor.
