= Ricardo Rey =

Argentine wrestler

Personal information
- Nationality: Argentine
- Born: 1910

Sport
- Sport: Wrestling

Ricardo Rey (born 1910, date of death unknown) was an Argentine wrestler. He competed in the men's Greco-Roman featherweight at the 1928 Summer Olympics.
