= Jean Lalemand =

Belgian wrestler

Personal information
- Nationality: Belgian
- Born: 11 September 1912

Sport
- Sport: Wrestling

Jean Lalemand (born 11 September 1912, date of death unknown) was a Belgian wrestler. He competed in the men's freestyle lightweight at the 1936 Summer Olympics.
