= Iso Milovančev =

Yugoslav wrestler (1902–1968)

Personal information
- Nationality: Yugoslav
- Born: 1902
- Died: 1968 (aged 65–66)

Sport
- Sport: Wrestling

Iso Milovančev (1902 – 1968) was a Yugoslav wrestler. He competed in the men's Greco-Roman featherweight at the 1928 Summer Olympics.
