= Adalbert Toots =

Estonian wrestler (1910–1948)

Personal information
- Nationality: Estonian
- Born: Viktor Aristokles-Adelberg Toots; 12 March 1910 Tartu, Estonia
- Died: 25 August 1948 (aged 38) Kemerovo Oblast, Russia

Sport
- Sport: Wrestling

Adalbert Toots (12 March 1910 – 25 August 1948) was an Estonian wrestler. He competed in the men's freestyle lightweight at the 1936 Summer Olympics. He was arrested by the NKVD in 1946 and died in a Soviet gulag prison camp in 1948.
