= Johannes Nolten Jr. =

Dutch wrestler

Johannes Nolten
Personal information
- Nationality: Dutch
- Born: 5 November 1908 Amsterdam, Netherlands
- Died: 7 February 1974 (aged 65) Leiden, Netherlands

Sport
- Sport: Wrestling

Johannes Nolten (5 November 1908 – 7 February 1974) was a Dutch wrestler. He competed in the men's Greco-Roman featherweight at the 1928 Summer Olympics.
