= Enrico Bonassin =

Italian wrestler

- Born: 16 May 1901; Genoa, Italy
- Died: 20 May 1971 (aged 70)

Enrico Bonassin (16 May 1901 – 20 May 1971) was an Italian wrestler. He competed at the 1924 and the 1928 Summer Olympics.
