= Carlo Jørgensen =

Danish wrestler (1903–1972)

Personal information
- Nationality: Danish
- Born: 25 March 1903 Copenhagen, Denmark
- Died: 20 December 1972 (aged 69) Copenhagen, Denmark

Sport
- Sport: Wrestling

Carlo Jørgensen (25 March 1903 – 20 December 1972) was a Danish wrestler. He competed in the men's freestyle lightweight at the 1928 Summer Olympics.
