= Gerolamo Quaglia =

Italian wrestler (1902–1985)

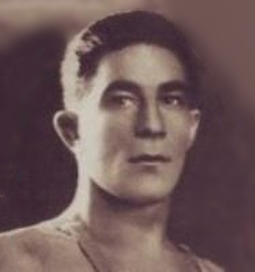

Personal information
- Born: 8 February 1902 São Paulo, Brazil
- Died: 11 November 1985 (aged 83) Genoa, Italy

Sport
- Sport: Greco-Roman wrestling
- Club: Andrea Doria, Genova
Medal record
Men's Greco-Roman wrestling
Representing Italy
Olympic Games
Bronze medal – third place	1928 Amsterdam	62 kg

Gerolamo Quaglia (8 February 1902 – 11 November 1985) was a featherweight Greco-Roman wrestler. Born in Brazil he competed for Italy in the 1924 and 1928 Olympics and won a bronze medal in 1928.
