= Harry Morris (sportsman) =

Australian diver and wrestler

Personal information
- Nationality: Australian
- Born: Thomas Henry Morris; 1896 Fitzroy, Victoria, Australia
- Died: 5 January 1974 (aged 77–78) South Yarra, Victoria, Australia

Sport
- Sport: Diving & Wrestling

Thomas Henry Morris (1896 – 5 January 1974) was a diver and wrestler who represent Australia at the 1928 Summer Olympics in both sports.

Morris was a member of the Melbourne Swimming Club, and in the 1919–20 season he won the clubs diving championship which was his first of 19 consecutive club titles, the following year he also won the Victoria state diving title which was his first of 10 titles in a row.

At the 1928 Summer Olympics in Amsterdam, Morris competed in three events, in the 3 metre springboard he finished eighth in his qualifying group which wasn't good enough to reach the final, it was the same outcome in the 10 metre platform event after finishing seventh in his qualifying group. At the same Games, Morris became the first Australian to compete in the wrestling events when he entered the welterweight contest, but he lost all three of his bouts, which was not helped having a knee injury and uncertainty of the continental rules that were used in Olympic bouts.

In 1949. Morris became chairman of the newly formed Australian Gymnastics Union in preparation for the 1956 Summer Olympics which were held in Melbourne, at those Games Morris was a member of the management committee for the gymnastics arena.
