= Hans Mollet =

Swiss wrestler

Personal information
- Nationality: Swiss
- Born: 1901 Büren, Bern Canton, Switzerland
- Died: 21 February 1957 (aged 55–56) Biel/Bienne, Switzerland

Sport
- Sport: Wrestling

Hans Mollet (1901 – 21 February 1957) was a Swiss wrestler. He competed in the men's freestyle lightweight at the 1928 Summer Olympics.
