= Gottlieb Wanzenried =

Swiss cyclist

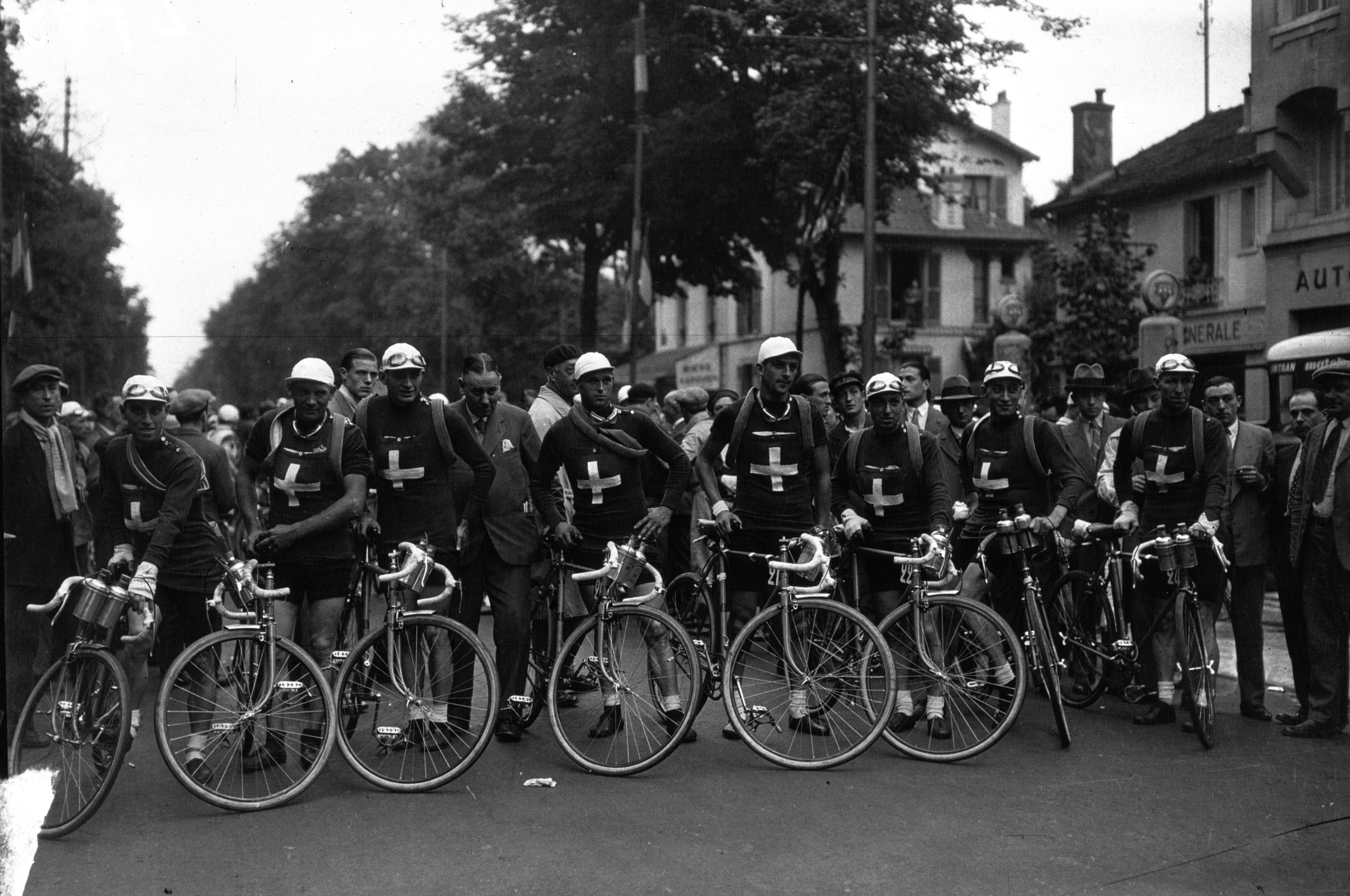
- Wanzenried (4th from the right) at the 1932 Tour de France

Personal information
- Born: 2 September 1906 Bern, Switzerland
- Died: 24 June 1993 (aged 86) Zurich, Switzerland

Cycling career
- Sport: Cycling

Gottlieb Wanzenried (2 September 1906 – 24 June 1993) was a Swiss cyclist. He competed in the individual and team road race events at the 1928 Summer Olympics.
