= Saim Arıkan =

Turkish wrestler

Personal information
- Full name: Mehmet Saim Arıkan
- Nationality: Turkish
- Born: 18 July 1906
- Died: 27 August 1997 (aged 91)

Sport
- Sport: Wrestling

Saim Arıkan (18 July 1906 – 27 August 1997) was a Turkish wrestler. He competed at the 1928 Summer Olympics and the 1936 Summer Olympics.
