= Thure Sjöstedt =

Swedish wrestler (1903–1956)

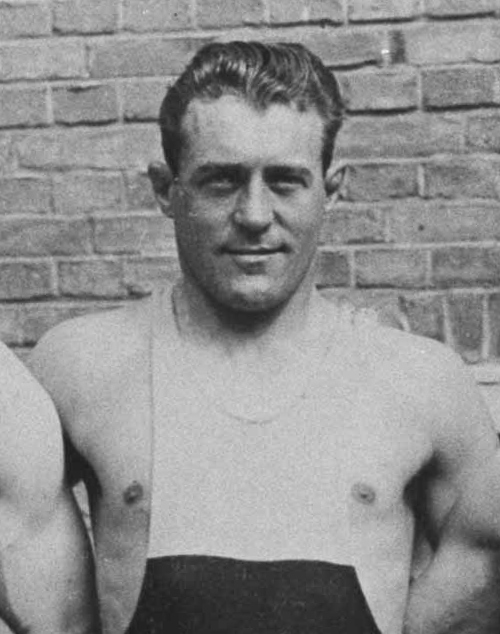
- Sjöstedt at the 1928 Olympics

Personal information
- Full name: Ture Sigvard Sjöstedt
- Born: 28 August 1903 Yngsjö, Sweden
- Died: 2 May 1956 (aged 52) Malmö, Sweden

Sport
- Sport: Wrestling
- Club: BK Kärnan, Limhamn, Malmö
Medal record
Representing Sweden
Men's freestyle wrestling
Olympic Games
Gold medal – first place	1928 Amsterdam	Light heavyweight
Silver medal – second place	1932 Los Angeles	Light heavyweight
European Championships
Gold medal – first place	1934 Stockholm	Unlimited
Men's Greco-Roman wrestling
European Championships
Silver medal – second place	1927 Budapest	82.5 kg

Ture Sigvard "Thure" Sjöstedt (28 August 1903 – 2 May 1956) was a Swedish wrestler.

== Career ==
In freestyle wrestling, he won a gold and a silver medal in the 1928 and 1932 Summer Olympics, respectively, as well as a European title in 1934. He finished second at the 1927 European Championships in Greco-Roman wrestling.

In the mid-1930s Sjöstedt turned professional and toured the United States with teammate Johan Richthoff. He later developed alcoholism problems and was eventually found dead in his garden cottage.
