= Maurice Letchford =

Canadian wrestler (1908–1965)

Personal information
- Born: August 27, 1908 Pretoria, Gauteng, South Africa
- Died: August 15, 1965 (aged 56)
- Home town: Montreal, Quebec, Canada

Professional wrestling career
- Country: Canada
- Sport: Amateur wrestling
- Event: Freestyle
Medal record
Men's freestyle wrestling
Representing Canada
Olympic Games
Bronze medal – third place	1928 Amsterdam	Welterweight

Maurice Letchford (August 27, 1908 – August 15, 1965) was a Canadian wrestler. He was born in Pretoria, South Africa and lived in Montreal, Canada. He was Olympic bronze medalist in freestyle wrestling in 1928, welterweight class, after losing to Lloyd Appleton in the semifinal, and winning the bronze medal match. Letchford became a professional wrestler in 1932 and competed through the late 1940s. He was a well-known performer in Canada, Britain, and the United States. He later became a wrestling promoter in Canada and South Africa.
