= Theofilos Tomazos =

Greek wrestler

Personal information
- Nationality: Greek
- Born: 30 August 1901 Stylloi, Cyprus

Sport
- Sport: Wrestling

Theofilos Tomazos (born 30 August 1901, date of death unknown) was a Greek wrestler. He competed in the men's freestyle welterweight at the 1928 Summer Olympics.
