= Hermann Simon (wrestler) =

German wrestler

Personal information
- Nationality: German
- Born: 19 October 1906 Wiesbaden, Germany
- Died: 7 April 1987 (aged 80) Einbeck, Germany

Sport
- Sport: Wrestling

Hermann Simon (19 October 1906 – 7 April 1987) was a German wrestler. He competed in the men's Greco-Roman middleweight at the 1928 Summer Olympics.
