= Jean Saenen =

Belgian wrestler

Personal information
- Nationality: Belgian
- Born: 28 May 1904 Boom, Belgium

Sport
- Sport: Wrestling

Jean Saenen (28 May 1905 – 17 November 1987) was a Belgian wrestler. He competed in the men's Greco-Roman middleweight at the 1928 Summer Olympics.
