= Charles Delporte (wrestler) =

French wrestler

Personal information
- Full name: Charles Eugène Delporte
- Nationality: French
- Born: 21 March 1914 Lille, France
- Died: 18 June 1940 (aged 26) Saint-Sauveur-de-Pierrepont, France

Sport
- Sport: Wrestling

Charles Eugène Delporte (21 March 1914 – 18 June 1940) was a French wrestler. He competed in the men's freestyle lightweight at the 1936 Summer Olympics. He was killed during the Second World War.

== Personal life ==
Delporte served as a matelot fusilier (seaman rifleman) in the French Navy during the Second World War. Stationed at coastal artillery positions in Cherbourg, he was killed by shrapnel on 18 June 1940 during the Battle of France.
