= Robert Mermoud =

Swiss water polo player

Personal information
- Nationality: Swiss
- Born: 25 September 1908

Sport
- Sport: Water polo

Robert Mermoud (born 25 September 1908) was a Swiss water polo player. He competed at the 1928 Summer Olympics and the 1936 Summer Olympics.
