= Allie Morrison =

American wrestler

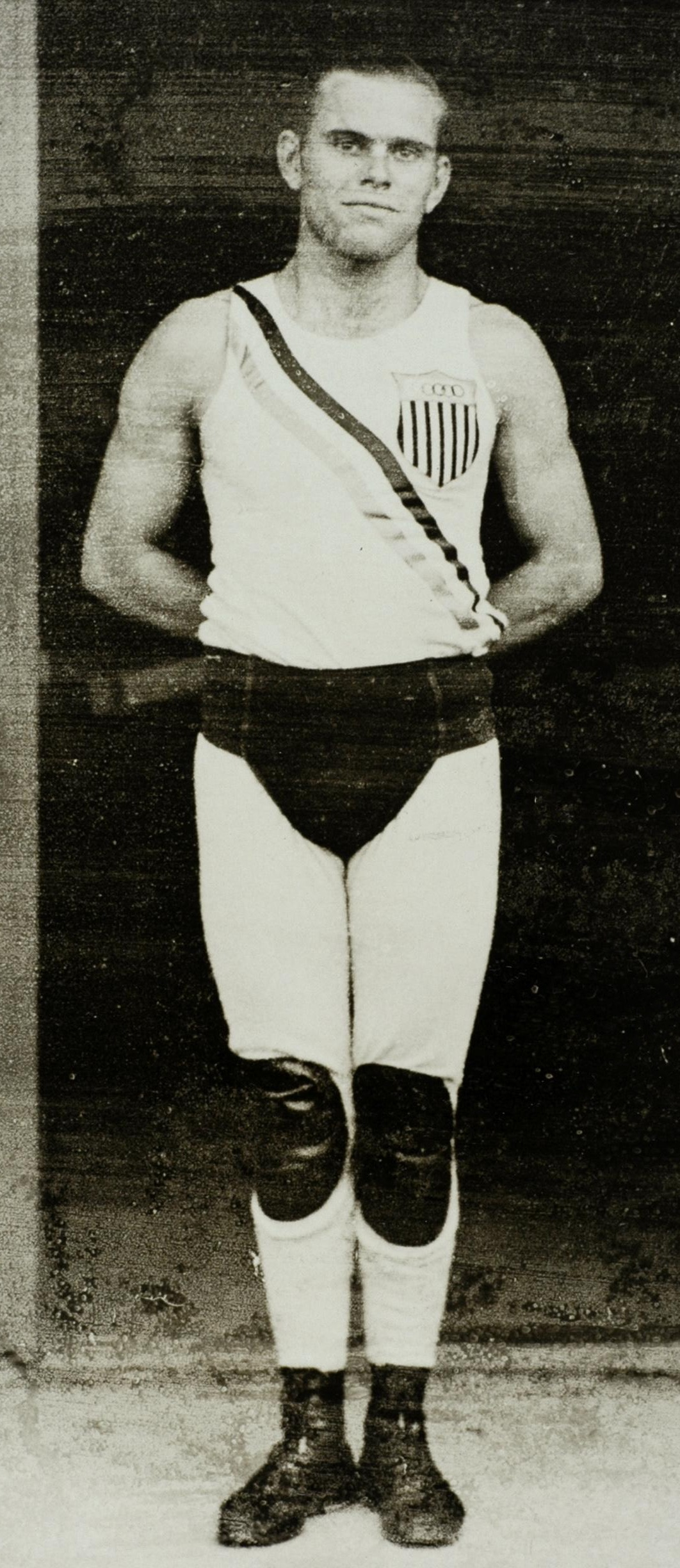
- Allie Morrison at the 1928 Olympics

Personal information
- Born: Alvin Roy Morrison; June 29, 1904 Marshalltown, Iowa, U.S.
- Died: April 18, 1966 (aged 61) Omaha, Nebraska, U.S.
- Height: 5 ft 5 in (1.65 m)
- Weight: 61 kg (134 lb)

Sport
- Country: United States
- Sport: Wrestling
- Events: Freestyle and Folkstyle
- College team: Illinois
- Team: USA
Medal record
Men's freestyle wrestling
Representing the United States
Olympic Games
Gold medal – first place	1928 Amsterdam	61 kg

Alvin Roy "Allie" Morrison (June 29, 1904 – April 18, 1966) was an American wrestler who won the freestyle featherweight competition at the 1928 Summer Olympics. Morrison was the only American wrestler to capture a gold medal at the 1928 Olympic Games.

== Wrestling career ==
As a high school sophomore, Morrison wrestled at the U.S. Olympic trials, but lost to the eventual champion. It was the only defeat of Morrison's wrestling career. Morrison wrestled collegiately at the University of Illinois. He won three consecutive U.S. AAU National Wrestling Championships and was the 1928 Big Ten champion. He never lost a match as a member of the Fighting Illini. At the 1928 Olympic Games, Morrison won the gold medal in freestyle wrestling in the featherweight division. Morrison became the first native Iowan to win an Olympic gold medal in any sport. He was forced to retire in 1929 due to broken vertebra and later coached wrestling and football.

Morrison has been inducted into the National Wrestling Hall of Fame as a Distinguished Member, the University of Illinois Hall of Fame, and the Iowa Wrestling Hall of Fame.

== Personal life ==
Morrison was born to Ethan Allen Morrison, a railroad worker, and Sarah Jean Morrison. At 5 feet 5 inches, he was shorter than his father. In 1927 Morrison married Ora Bass, a woman from his hometown, they had one daughter, Bessie Jane Morrison Svehla, born in Pennsylvania in 1931. His wife died in 1960.

On March 2, 1929, Morrison broke some of the vertebrae in his neck during a wrestling match. Fearing paralysis, doctors forced him to retire from wrestling. Next year Morrison graduated from the University of Illinois with a degree in English and physical education and began coaching wrestling and football. His career was interrupted by World War II, during which he served in the U.S. Navy as a petty officer. Morrison retired after 1952 and later would run a tavern.
