= Ludwig Schlanger =

Austrian wrestler

Personal information
- Nationality: Austrian
- Born: 22 December 1904 Novi Sad, Austria-Hungary
- Died: 16 February 2001 (aged 96) Los Angeles, California, United States

Sport
- Sport: Wrestling

Ludwig Schlanger (22 December 1904 – 16 February 2001) was an Austrian wrestler. He competed in the men's Greco-Roman featherweight at the 1928 Summer Olympics.
