= Gottlieb Amstein =

Swiss cyclist

Personal information
- Born: 6 August 1906 Zurich, Switzerland
- Died: 18 July 1975 (aged 68) Zürich, Switzerland

Cycling career
- Sport: Cycling

Gottlieb Amstein (6 August 1906 – 18 July 1975) was a Swiss cyclist. He competed in the individual and team road race events at the 1928 Summer Olympics.
