= Franjo Palković =

Yugoslav wrestler (1906–1993)

Personal information
- Nationality: Yugoslav
- Born: 16 May 1906 Čantavir, Austria-Hungary
- Died: 12 May 1993 (aged 86) Zagreb, Croatia

Sport
- Sport: Wrestling

Franjo Palković (16 May 1906 – 12 May 1993) was a Yugoslav wrestler. He competed in the men's Greco-Roman middleweight at the 1928 Summer Olympics.
