= Donald Stockton =

Canadian wrestler (1904–1978)

- Full name: Donald Parker Stockton
- Weight: 174 lb (79 kg)
- Born: 22 February 1904; Montreal, Quebec, Canada
- Died: 16 June 1978 (aged 74); Montreal, Quebec, Canada
Medal record
Men's freestyle wrestling
Representing Canada
Olympic Games
Silver medal – second place	1928 Amsterdam	Middleweight

Donald Parker Stockton (22 February 1904 – 16 June 1978) was a Canadian Olympic medalist in freestyle wrestling. He won an Olympic silver medalist at the 1928 Summer Olympics, and also competed at the 1924 and 1932 Summer Olympics.

== Early life ==
Donald Stockton was born in Montreal on 22 February 1904.

== Career ==
Stockton began his Olympic career at the 1924 Summer Olympics in the freestyle welterweight division. At the 1928 Summer Olympics, he became the first Canadian to be awarded an Olympic silver medal in wrestling. Stockton final Olympic games were at the 1932 Summer Olympics. After his Olympic career, Stockton became a professional wrestler in 1933 and wrestled at the Mount Royal Arena.

== Awards and honours ==
In 1953, Stockton entered the Canadian Olympic Hall of Fame and was inducted into the Canadian Amateur Wrestling Hall of Fame in 1975. Stockton was posthumously inducted into the Quebec Sports Hall of Fame in 2016.

== Death ==
Stockton died in Montreal on 16 June 1978.
