= Clarence Berryman =

American wrestler

Personal information
- Born: August 10, 1906 Okemah, Oklahoma, U.S.
- Died: August 25, 1986 (aged 80) Fort Worth, Texas, U.S.

Sport
- Country: United States
- Sport: Wrestling
- Event: Freestyle
- College team: Oklahoma A&M
- Team: USA
- Coached by: Edward C. Gallagher

Clarence Berryman (August 10, 1906 – August 25, 1986) was an American wrestler. He competed in the men's freestyle lightweight at the 1928 Summer Olympics.
