= Henri Lefèbvre (wrestler) =

French wrestler (1905–1970)

Medal record

Men's freestyle wrestling

Representing France

Olympic Games
| Bronze medal – third place | 1928 Amsterdam | Light heavyweight |

Henri Lefèbvre (19 December 1905 – 11 June 1970) was a French wrestler who competed in the 1928 Summer Olympics.
