= Ali Kamel =

Egyptian wrestler

Personal information
- Nationality: Egyptian

Sport
- Sport: Wrestling

Ali Kamel was an Egyptian wrestler. He competed in the men's Greco-Roman featherweight at the 1928 Summer Olympics. Kamel is deceased.
