= Johannes Jacobsen =

Danish wrestler (1898–1932)

Personal information
- Nationality: Danish
- Born: 27 December 1898 Copenhagen, Denmark
- Died: 7 March 1932 (aged 33) Copenhagen, Denmark

Sport
- Sport: Wrestling

Johannes Jacobsen (27 December 1898 – 7 March 1932) was a Danish wrestler. He competed in the men's freestyle welterweight and the Greco-Roman middleweight events at the 1928 Summer Olympics.
