= Hermanni Pihlajamäki =

Finnish wrestler (1903–1982)

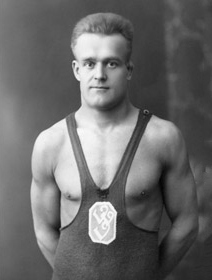

Personal information
- Born: 11 November 1903 Nurmo, Finland
- Died: 4 June 1982 (aged 78) Ähtäri, Finland

Sport
- Sport: Wrestling
- Club: Vaasan Voima-Veikot
Medal record
Representing Finland
Olympic Games
Gold medal – first place	1932 Los Angeles	Freestyle, 61 kg
Bronze medal – third place	1936 Berlin	Freestyle, 66 kg
European championships
Gold medal – first place	1931 Copenhagen	Freestyle, 61 kg
Silver medal – second place	1935 Brussels	Freestyle, 66 kg
Silver medal – second place	1935 Copenhagen	Greco-Roman, 66 kg

Herman Matinpoika "Hermanni" Pihlajamäki (11 November 1903 – 4 June 1982) was a Finnish wrestler. He competed in freestyle wrestling at the 1932 and 1936 Olympics and won a gold and a bronze medal, respectively. At the European championships he won a freestyle gold medal in 1931, and two silver medals in 1935, in freestyle and Greco-Roman wrestling.

Pihlajamäki won six Finnish titles: in 1927, 1930, 1932 and 1935–1937, five of them in freestyle wrestling. He worked as a policeman. His cousin Kustaa was also a policeman and an Olympic champion in wrestling.
