= Ernst Fäs =

Swiss cyclist (1909–1980)

Personal information
- Full name: Ernst Fäs
- Born: 1909
- Died: August 1980 (aged 70–71) Zürich

Cycling career
- Sport: Cycling

Ernst Fäs (1909 – August 1980) was a Swiss cyclist from Zurich. He competed in the team pursuit and the time trial events at the 1928 Summer Olympics.

On 24 July 1930, Fäs set the Swiss hour record, covering 42.448 km (26.376 mi) and beating the previous record set by Oskar Egg.
