= Birger Nilsen =

Norwegian sport wrestler (1896–1968)

Personal information
- Born: 10 October 1896 Kristiania, Norway
- Died: 19 October 1968 (aged 72) Oslo

Sport
- Sport: Wrestling
- Club: SK av 1909
Medal record
Men's wrestling
Representing Norway
World Championships
Bronze medal – third place	1922 Stockholm	Lightweight

Birger Erling Nilsen (10 October 1896 – 19 October 1968) was a Norwegian sport wrestler.

Born in Kristiania on 10 October 1896, Nilsen represented the club SK av 1909. He competed at the 1928 Summer Olympics, where he placed fourth in Freestyle wrestling. He won a bronze medal in the lightweight class at the 1922 World Wrestling Championships.

Nilsen died in Oslo on 19 October 1968.
