= László Papp (wrestler) =

Hungarian wrestler (1905–1989)

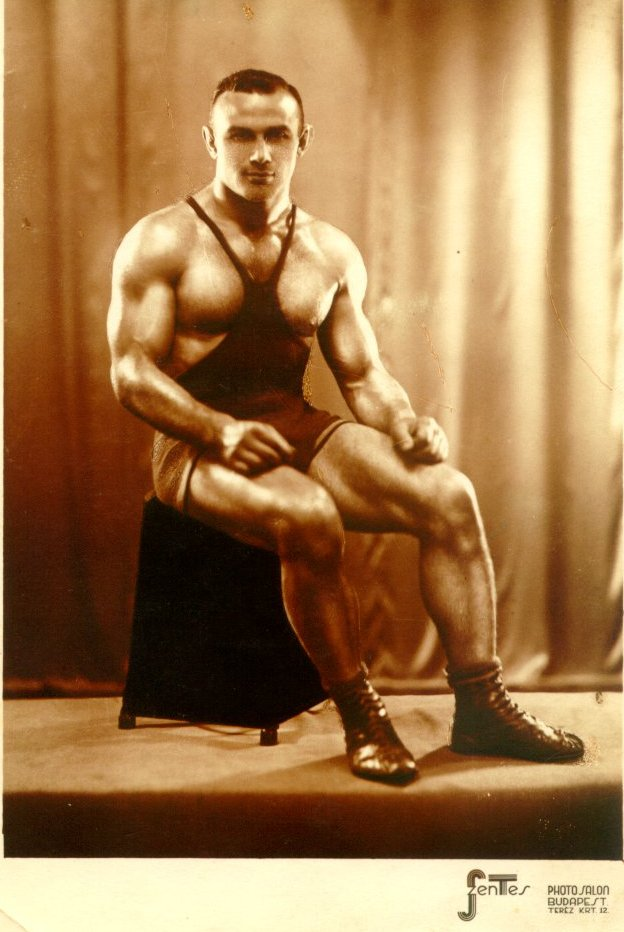
- László Papp (wrestler)

Personal information
- Born: January 4, 1905 Szentes, Hungary
- Died: January 28, 1989 (aged 84) Budapest, Hungary
Medal record
Men's Greco-Roman wrestling
Representing Hungary
Olympic Games
Silver medal – second place	1928 Amsterdam	Middleweight

László Papp (4 January 1905 – 28 January 1989) was a Hungarian wrestler who competed in the 1928 Summer Olympics.
