= Charles Pacôme =

French freestyle wrestler (1902–1978)

Personal information
- Born: November 5, 1902 Bergues, France
- Died: October 1, 1978 (aged 75) Wasquehal, France
Medal record
Men's freestyle wrestling
Representing France
Olympic Games
Gold medal – first place	1932 Los Angeles	Lightweight
Silver medal – second place	1928 Amsterdam	Lightweight

Charles Pacôme (5 November 1902 – 1 October 1978), born in Bergues, Nord, was a French olympic champion in freestyle wrestling.

== Olympics ==
Pacôme competed at the 1928 Summer Olympics and won silver medal in freestyle wrestling, and went on to earn a gold medal at 1932 Summer Olympics.
