= Albert Kusnets =

Estonian wrestler (1902–1942)

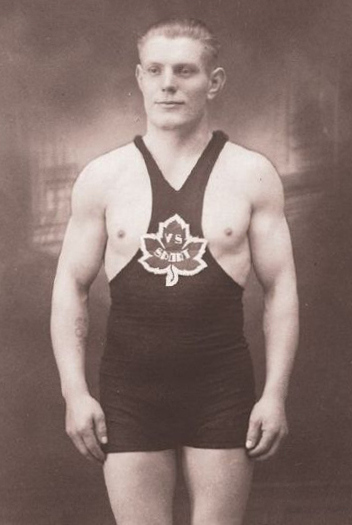
- Kusnets circa 1930

Personal information
- Born: Albert Eduard Kusnets; 25 August 1902 Suure-Kambja, Estonia
- Died: 1942 (aged 39–40) Verkhnyaya Toyma, Arkhangelsk Oblast, Russia

Sport
- Sport: Greco-Roman wrestling
- Club: Kalev Tallinn; Sport Tallinn
Medal record
Men's Greco-Roman wrestling
Representing Estonia
Olympic Games
Bronze medal – third place	1928 Amsterdam	75 kg
European Championships
Silver medal – second place	1927 Budapest	75 kg
Silver medal – second place	1931 Prague	75 kg
Bronze medal – third place	1933 Helsinki	75 kg

Albert Eduard Kusnets (25 August 1902 – 1942) was a middleweight Greco-Roman wrestler from Estonia. He competed in the 1924 and 1928 Summer Olympics and placed fourth and third, respectively. He won his 1928 bronze medal despite breaking a leg in 1928 and not competing until the Olympics. He earned three more medals at the European championships in 1927–1933. Kusnets missed the 1932 Olympics, because Estonia could not afford sending a team to Los Angeles during the Great Depression. After retiring in 1933 he worked as wrestling coach, and prepared the Olympic champion Kristjan Palusalu.

In 1941, he was sent to a Russian labor camp in Arkhangelsk Oblast, where he starved to death the next winter.
