= Hans Minder =

Swiss wrestler

Medal record

Men's freestyle wrestling

Representing Switzerland

Olympic Games
| Bronze medal – third place | 1928 Amsterdam | Featherweight |

Hans Minder (born 28 August 1908, date of death unknown) was a Swiss wrestler. He was Olympic bronze medalist in Freestyle wrestling in 1928.
