= Arnold Bögli =

Swiss wrestler

Personal information
- Born: 31 May 1897
Medal record
Men's freestyle wrestling
Representing Switzerland
Olympic Games
Silver medal – second place	1928 Amsterdam	Light heavyweight

Arnold Bögli (31 May 1897 – 2 October 1971) was a Swiss wrestler. He was Olympic silver medalist in Freestyle wrestling in 1928.
