= Alfred Larsen (wrestler) =

Norwegian sport wrestler

Karl Alfred Larsen (22 January 1905 – 6 June 1983) was a Norwegian sport wrestler who competed in the 1928 Summer Olympics.

He represented the sports club SK av 1909. He participated in the middleweight class in wrestling at the 1928 Summer Olympics, where he finished thirteenth overall. He died in Oslo.
