= Anton Praeg =

South African wrestler

Arthur Praeg
Personal information
- Nationality: South African
- Born: 1897

Sport
- Sport: Wrestling

Arthur Praeg (born 1897, date of death unknown) was a South African wrestler. He competed in the men's freestyle middleweight at the 1928 Summer Olympics.
