= Jacques Dillen =

Belgian wrestler

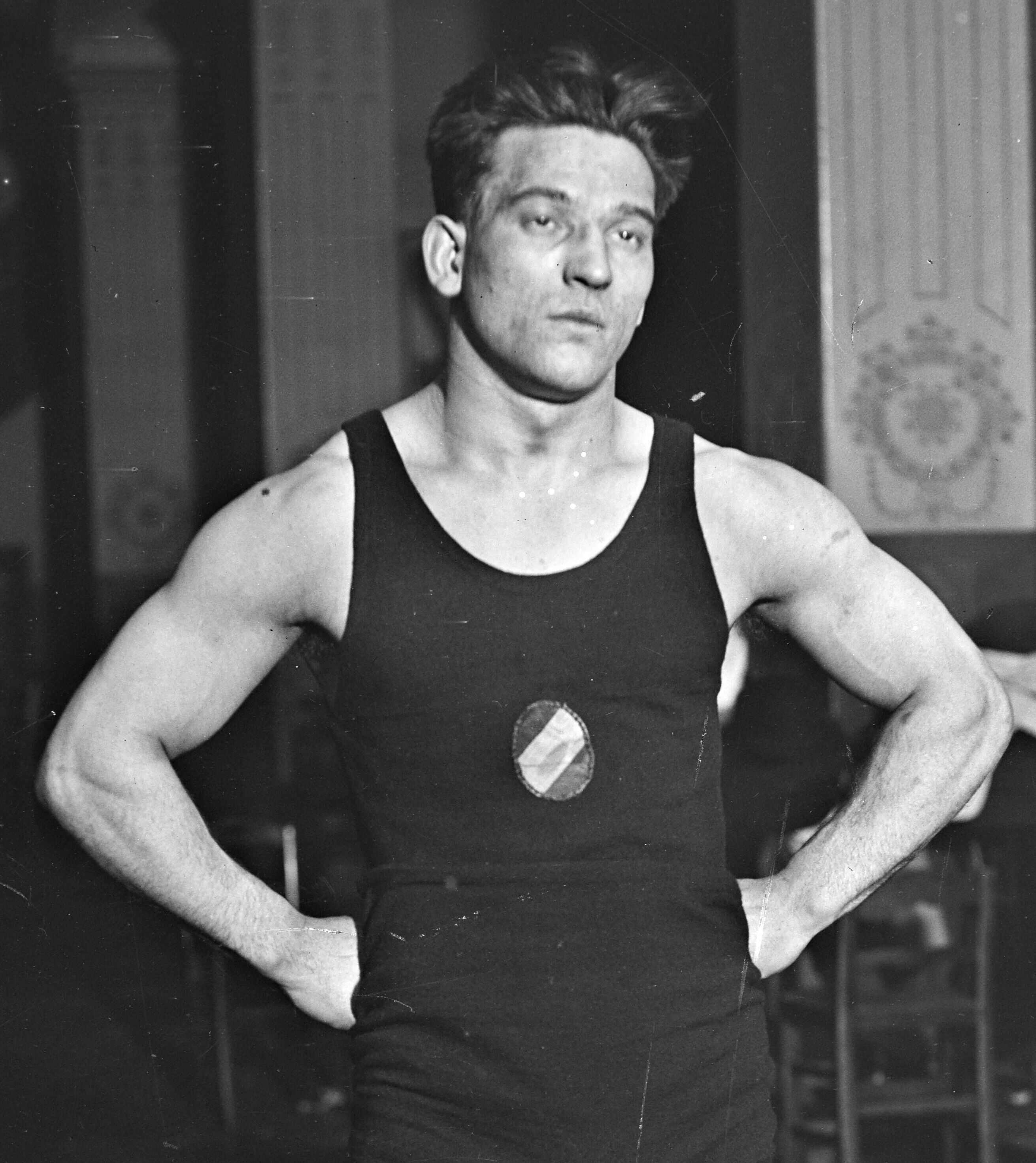
- Jacques Dillen in 1928
- Born: 15 October 1906
- Died: 5 January 1992 (aged 85)

Jacques Dillen (25 October 1906 – 5 January 1992) was a Belgian wrestler. He competed at the 1924 and 1928 Summer Olympics.
