= Wolfgang Ehrl =

German wrestler (1912–1980)

Medal record

Representing Germany

Olympic Games

Men's Greco-Roman wrestling
Silver medal – second place	1932 Los Angeles	Featherweight

Men's freestyle wrestling
Silver medal – second place	1936 Berlin	Lightweight

Wolfgang Ehrl (4 March 1912, in Munich – 11 June 1980, in Munich) was a German wrestler who competed at the 1932 Summer Olympics and the 1936 Summer Olympics.
