= Howard Thomas (wrestler) =

Canadian wrestler (1905–1995)

Personal information
- Nationality: Canadian
- Born: January 18, 1905 London, England
- Died: March 17, 1995 (aged 90) Burlington, Ontario, Canada

Sport
- Sport: Wrestling
Medal record
Men's Wrestling
Representing Canada
British Empire Games
Gold medal – first place	1930 Hamilton	Lightweight
Bronze medal – third place	1934 London	Lightweight

Howard V. Thomas (January 18, 1905 – March 17, 1995) was a Canadian wrestler who competed in two Olympic Games in 1932 and 1936. He was born in London, England.

Thomas competed in the 1932 Summer Olympics in Men's Freestyle 66 kg and in the 1936 Summer Olympics in same event, but did not win a medal. He won a gold medal in the lightweight division at the 1930 British Empire Games and a bronze medal in the same event at the 1934 British Empire Games. Thomas died in Burlington, Ontario in 1995.
