= Károly Kárpáti =

Hungarian wrestler (1906–1996)

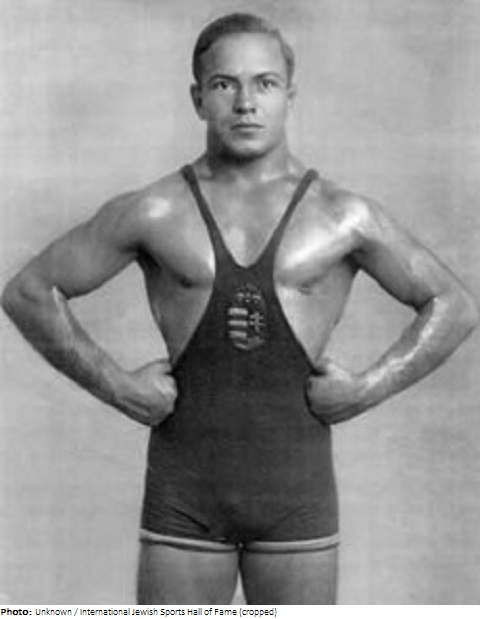

Personal information
- Born: July 2, 1906 Eger, Kingdom of Hungary, Austro-Hungarian Empire
- Died: September 23, 1996 (aged 90) Budapest, Hungary
Medal record
Men's freestyle wrestling
Representing Hungary
Olympic Games
| Gold medal – first place | 1936 Berlin | Lightweight |
| Silver medal – second place | 1932 Los Angeles | Lightweight |

Károly Kárpáti (also Károly Kellner, born July 2, 1906, in Eger – September 23, 1996, in Budapest) was a Hungarian Olympic wrestling champion of Jewish heritage.

== Career ==
Károly Kárpáti was born on July 2, 1906, in Eger in the Austro-Hungarian Empire. His early chances of becoming an elite athlete seemed negligible as he was introduced to wrestling by a doctor who told his parents that physical activity might help strengthen their short and underweight son. Defying the odds, in his crowning achievement, he won an Olympic gold medal in 1936 in the Lightweight Freestyle class. As a Jewish wrestler, his victory in the Berlin 1936 Nazi Olympics provided special significance, because it came at the expense of Germany's vaunted titleholder, Wolfgang Ehrl. Kárpáti was one of only around nine Jewish athletes who won medals at the Nazi Olympics in Berlin in 1936.

He won a silver medal in the Lightweight Freestyle class at the 1932 Summer Olympics in Los Angeles. In 1928 at the Amsterdam Games, he finished fourth in the same weight class.

He was Hungary's first "freestyle" wrestler, winning his first Hungarian National Junior title in 1925. He went on to win ten Hungarian National Championships, as well as European Lightweight wrestling crowns in 1927, 1929, 1930, and 1935. He also won one silver and two bronze medals in European Championships competitions during the years in between.

Kárpáti was a Hungarian wrestling master trainer-coach and Olympics coach for many years. He authored six books on the sport of wrestling.

The Hungarian champion listed among his hobbies Einstein's Theory of Relativity. In 1982, International Olympic Committee President Juan Antonio Samaranch presented the bronze medal of the Olympic Order to Kárpáti for his lifelong work with youth in sports education.

== The Holocaust ==
During the Second World War and increasingly antisemitic policies in Hungary, as an Olympic Champion, Kárpáti was initially exempt from forced labor camp service or concentration camps where a vast number of the Jewish population were sent. Ultimately, however, he was arrested and sent to work on a labor crew in Nadvirna, Poland and in Western Ukraine. While there, he witnessed the killing of a fellow inmate, Olympic champion fencer Attila Petschauer, and later recalled: “The guards shouted: ‘You, Olympic fencing medal winner . . . let’s see how you can climb trees.’ It was midwinter and bitter cold, but they ordered him to undress, then climb a tree. The amused guards ordered him to crow like a rooster, and sprayed him with water. Frozen from the water, he died shortly after.”

For the rest of the war he succeeded in hiding in the Banki woods and in Pest with family and friends. Kárpáti died in 1996 at age 90.

== See also ==
- List of select Jewish wrestlers
