= Voldemar Väli =

Estonian wrestler (1903–1997)

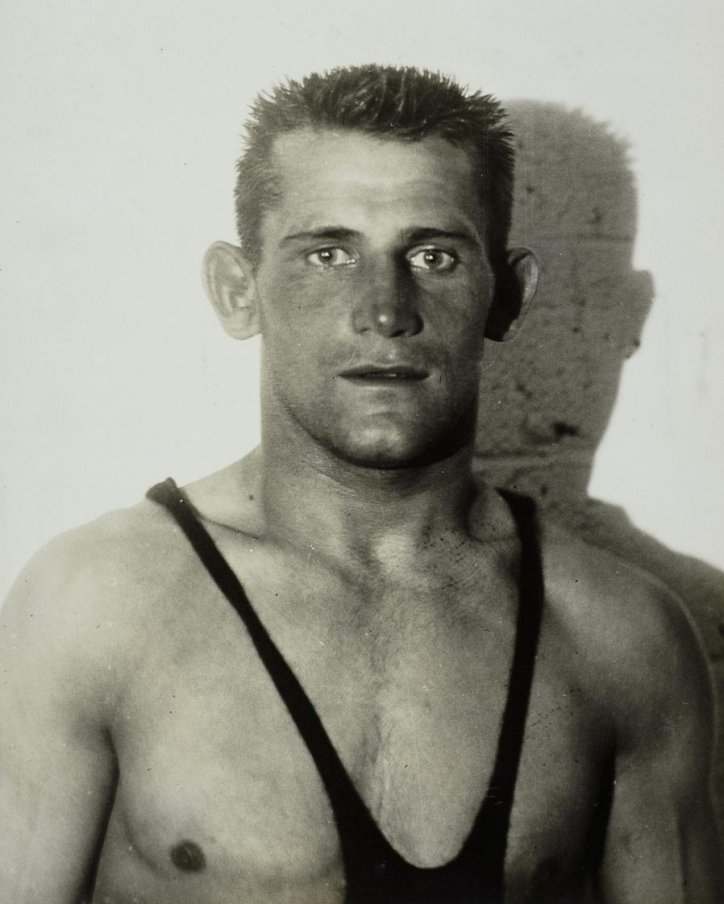
- Voldemar Väli at the 1928 Olympics

Personal information
- Born: 10 January 1903 Kuressaare, Governorate of Livonia, Russian Empire
- Died: 13 April 1997 (aged 94) Stockholm, Sweden

Sport
- Sport: Greco-Roman wrestling
Medal record
Men's Greco-Roman wrestling
Representing Estonia
Olympic Games
| Gold medal – first place | 1928 Amsterdam | 62 kg |
| Bronze medal – third place | 1936 Berlin | 66 kg |
European Championships
| Gold medal – first place | 1926 Riga | 62 kg |
| Gold medal – first place | 1927 Budapest | 62 kg |
| Silver medal – second place | 1930 Stockholm | 66 kg |
| Silver medal – second place | 1931 Prague | 66 kg |

Voldemar Väli (10 January 1903 – 13 April 1997) was an Estonian two-time Olympic medalist in Greco-Roman wrestling.

== Career ==
Voldemar Väli was born in Kuressaare, on the island of Saaremaa. He began training in wrestling at age 17, and four years later competed at the 1924 Olympics, but was eliminated in a preliminary bout. In 1926 he won his first European title and established himself as a world top featherweight and later lightweight wrestler. He missed the 1932 Olympics because Estonia did not send a team due to the Great Depression, and finished out of the podium at the 1933, 1934, 1937 and 1938 European Championships; however, he earned a bronze at the 1936 Summer Olympics in Berlin. Domestically he won 19 titles between 1922 and 1942 in Greco-Roman and freestyle events. During World War II in 1944 he emigrated with family to Sweden. He ended his sporting career in 1945 after a match between the local Estonians and the team from Stockholm. He beat the Swedish champion Einar Karlsson.

Väli worked a crane operator at the Port of Tallinn. In Sweden, he was a metal worker and later established a doll factory with his wife.

== Legacy ==
A bronze sculpture of Väli was installed at the sports centre in his hometown of Kuressaare in October 2024.
