= Ernst Kyburz =

Swiss wrestler (1898–1983)

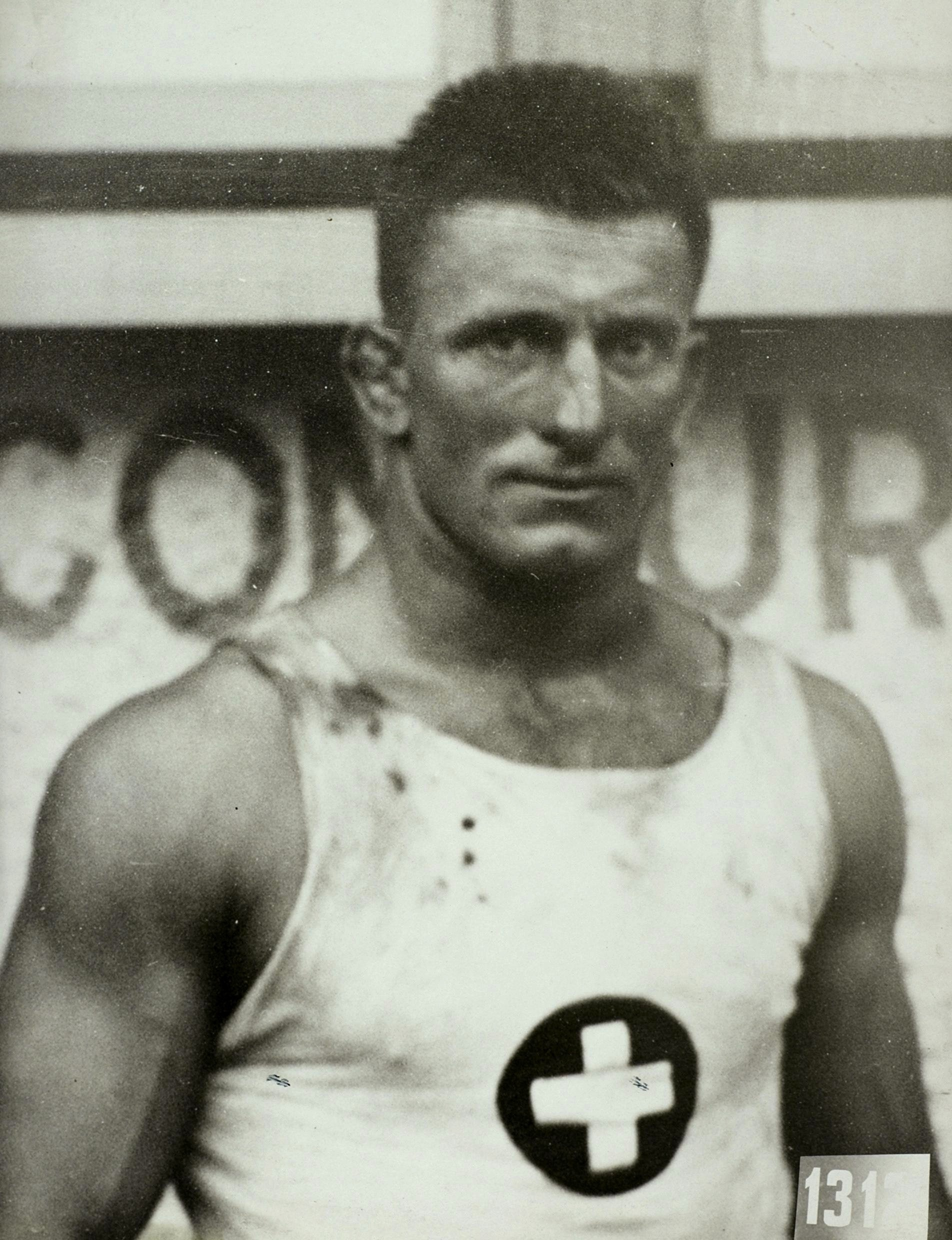
- Kyburz at the 1928 Olympics

Personal information
- Born: 14 August 1898 Arbon, Switzerland
- Died: 16 October 1983 (aged 85) Ronco sopra Ascona, Switzerland
Medal record
Men's freestyle wrestling
Representing Switzerland
Olympic Games
Gold medal – first place	1928 Amsterdam	Middleweight
European Championships
Gold medal – first place	1931 Budapest	Middleweight

Ernst Kyburz (14 August 1898 – 16 October 1983) was a Swiss freestyle wrestler who won gold medals at the 1928 Summer Olympics and 1931 European Championships in the middleweight category.
