= Wrestling at the 1928 Summer Olympics =

Coordinates: 52.3444°N 4.8560°E

Wrestling at the Games of the IX Olympiad
- Venue: Vélodrome d'Hiver
- Dates: 30 July –5 August 1928
- No. of events: 13 (13 men, 0 women)
- Competitors: 166 from 29 nations

At the 1928 Summer Olympics, thirteen wrestling events were contested, for all men. There were six weight classes in Greco-Roman wrestling and seven classes in freestyle wrestling. The freestyle competitions were held from July 30 to August 1, 1928 and the Greco-Roman events were held from August 2 to August 5, 1928.

== Medal summary ==
=== Freestyle ===
Games	Gold	Silver	Bronze
Bantamweight	Kaarlo Mäkinen; Finland	Edmond Spapen; Belgium	James Trifunov; Canada
Featherweight	Allie Morrison; United States	Kustaa Pihlajamäki; Finland	Hans Minder; Switzerland
Lightweight	Osvald Käpp; Estonia	Charles Pacôme; France	Eino Augusti Leino; Finland
Welterweight	Arvo Haavisto; Finland	Lloyd Appleton; United States	Maurice Letchford; Canada
Middleweight	Ernst Kyburz; Switzerland	Donald Stockton; Canada	Samuel Rabin; Great Britain
Light Heavyweight	Thure Sjöstedt; Sweden	Arnold Bögli; Switzerland	Henri Lefèbre; France
Heavyweight	Johan Richthoff; Sweden	Aukusti Sihvola; Finland	Edmond Dame; France

=== Greco-Roman ===
Games	Gold	Silver	Bronze
Bantamweight	Kurt Leucht; Germany	Jindrich Maudr; Czechoslovakia	Giovanni Gozzi; Italy
Featherweight	Voldemar Väli; Estonia	Eric Malmberg; Sweden	Gerolamo Quaglia; Italy
Lightweight	Lajos Keresztes; Hungary	Eduard Sperling; Germany	Edvard Westerlund; Finland
Middleweight	Väinö Kokkinen; Finland	László Papp; Hungary	Albert Kusnets; Estonia
Light Heavyweight	Ibrahim Moustafa; Egypt	Adolf Rieger; Germany	Onni Pellinen; Finland
Heavyweight	Rudolf Svensson; Sweden	Hjalmar Nyström; Finland	Georg Gehring; Germany

== Participating nations ==
166 wrestlers from 29 nations competed. Argentina competed in wrestling for the first time.

- Argentina (5)
- Australia (3)
- Austria (2)
- Belgium (13)
- Canada (5)
- Czechoslovakia (6)
- Denmark (7)
- Egypt (4)
- Estonia (6)
- Finland (13)

- France (13)
- Germany (6)
- Great Britain (6)
- Greece (3)
- Hungary (6)
- Italy (5)
- Japan (1)
- Latvia (2)
- Luxembourg (3)
- Netherlands (6)

- Norway (7)
- Poland (4)
- Portugal (1)
- South Africa (1)
- Sweden (9)
- Switzerland (11)
- Turkey (6)
- United States (7)
- Yugoslavia (5)

== Medal table ==
Rank	Nation	Gold	Silver	Bronze	Total
1	Finland	3	3	3	9
2	Sweden	3	1	0	4
3	Estonia	2	0	1	3
4	Germany	1	2	1	4
5	Switzerland	1	1	1	3
6	Hungary	1	1	0	2
6	United States	1	1	0	2
8	Egypt	1	0	0	1
9	Canada	0	1	2	3
9	France	0	1	2	3
11	Belgium	0	1	0	1
11	Czechoslovakia	0	1	0	1
13	Italy	0	0	2	2
14	Great Britain	0	0	1	1
Totals (14 entries)		13	13	13	39

== See also ==
- List of World and Olympic Champions in men's freestyle wrestling
- List of World and Olympic Champions in Greco-Roman wrestling
