= Lloyd Appleton =

American wrestler (1906–1999)

Personal information
- Full name: Lloyd Otto Appleton
- Born: February 1, 1906 Edgewood, Iowa, U.S.
- Died: March 17, 1999 (aged 93) Oberlin, Ohio, U.S.

Sport
- Country: United States
- Sport: Wrestling
- Events: Freestyle and Folkstyle
- College team: Cornell College (Iowa)
- Team: USA
Medal record
Men's freestyle wrestling
Representing the United States
Olympic Games
Silver medal – second place	1928 Amsterdam	72 kg

Lloyd Otto Appleton (February 1, 1906 – March 17, 1999) was an American wrestler who competed in the 1928 Summer Olympics. Appleton was born in Edgewood, Iowa and died in Oberlin, Ohio. In 1983, Appleton was inducted into the National Wrestling Hall of Fame as a Distinguished Member.
