= Finland at the 1928 Summer Olympics =

- IOC code: FIN
- NOC: Finnish Olympic Committee

in Amsterdam
- Competitors: 69 (67 men, 2 women) in 11 sports
- Flag bearer: Akilles Järvinen
- Medals Ranked 3rd: Gold 8 Silver 8 Bronze 9 Total 25

Summer Olympics appearances (overview)
- 1908; 1912; 1920; 1924; 1928; 1932; 1936; 1948; 1952; 1956; 1960; 1964; 1968; 1972; 1976; 1980; 1984; 1988; 1992; 1996; 2000; 2004; 2008; 2012; 2016; 2020; 2024; 2028

Other related appearances
- 1906 Intercalated Games

Finland competed at the 1928 Summer Olympics in Amsterdam, Netherlands. 69 competitors (67 men and 2 women) took part in 48 events in 11 sports.

== Medalists ==
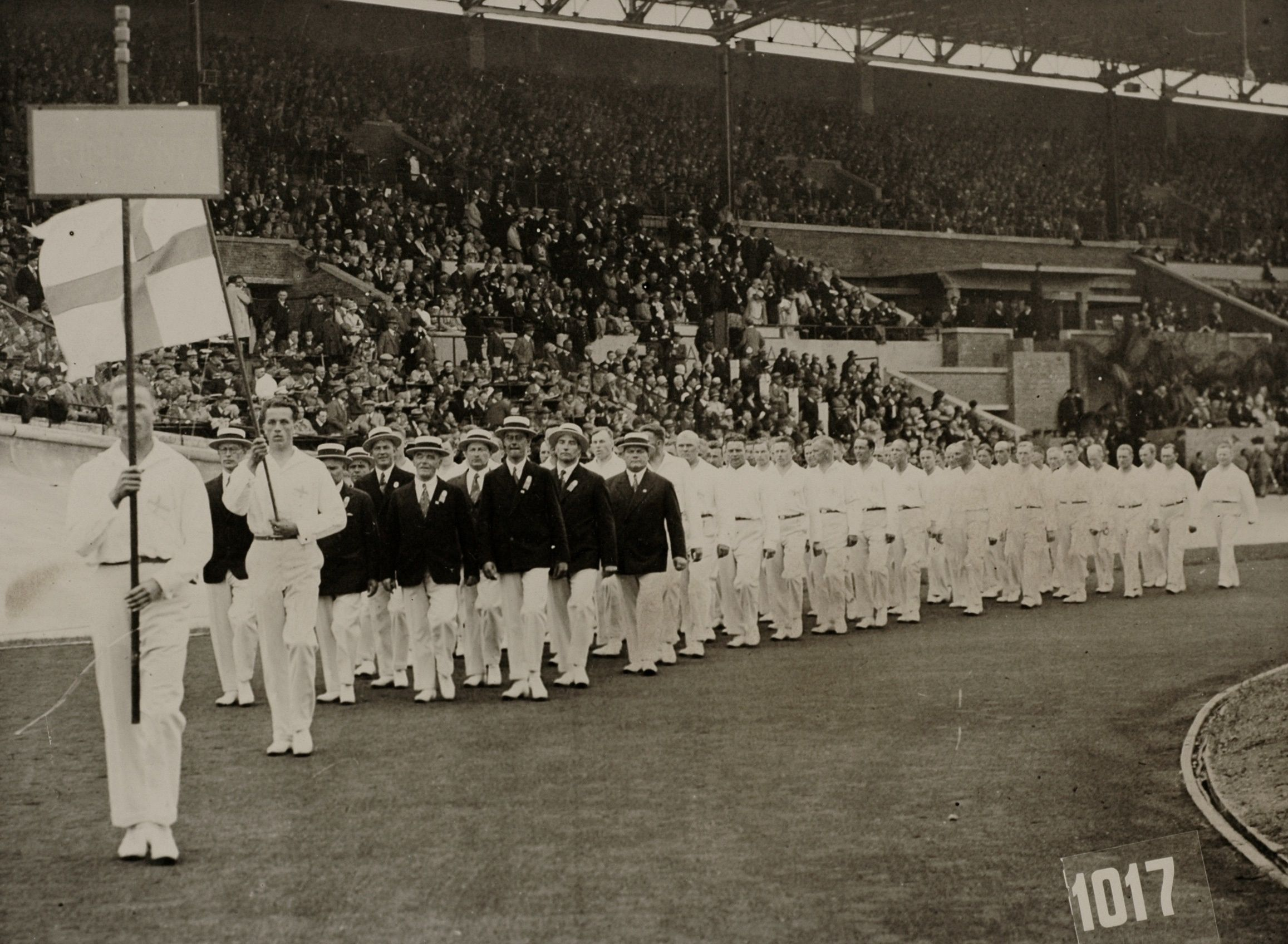
Team of Finland at the opening ceremony.

Medal	Name	Sport	Event	Date
Gold	Harri Larva	Athletics	Men's 1500 m	2 August
Gold	Ville Ritola	Athletics	Men's 5000 m	3 August
Gold	Paavo Nurmi	Athletics	Men's 10,000 m	29 July
Gold	Toivo Loukola	Athletics	Men's 3000 m steeplechase	4 August
Gold	Paavo Yrjölä	Athletics	Men's decathlon	5 August
Gold	Kaarlo Mäkinen	Wrestling	Men's freestyle bantamweight	1 August
Gold	Arvo Haavisto	Wrestling	Men's freestyle welterweight	1 August
Gold	Väinö Kokkinen	Wrestling	Men's Greco-Roman middleweight	5 August
Silver	Paavo Nurmi	Athletics	Men's 5000 m	3 August
Silver	Paavo Nurmi	Athletics	Men's 3000 m steeplechase	4 August
Silver	Ville Ritola	Athletics	Men's 10,000 m	29 July
Silver	Antero Kivi	Athletics	Men's discus throw	1 August
Silver	Akilles Järvinen	Athletics	Men's decathlon	5 August
Silver	Kustaa Pihlajamäki	Wrestling	Men's freestyle featherweight	August 1
Silver	Aukusti Sihvola	Wrestling	Men's freestyle heavyweight	1 August
Silver	Hjalmar Nyström	Wrestling	Men's Greco-Roman heavyweight	5 August
Bronze	Eino Purje	Athletics	Men's 1500 m	2 August
Bronze	Ove Andersen	Athletics	Men's 3000 m steeplechase	4 August
Bronze	Martti Marttelin	Athletics	Men's marathon	5 August
Bronze	Vilho Tuulos	Athletics	Men's triple jump	2 August
Bronze	Heikki Savolainen	Gymnastics	Men's pommel horse	8 August
Bronze	Bertel Broman	Sailing	12 foot dinghy	9 August
Bronze	Eino Leino	Wrestling	Men's freestyle lightweight	1 August
Bronze	Edvard Westerlund	Wrestling	Men's Greco-Roman lightweight	5 August
Bronze	Onni Pellinen	Wrestling	Men's Greco-Roman light heavyweight	5 August

== Aquatics ==
=== Diving ===
Two divers, a man and a woman, represented Finland in 1928. It was the nation's fifth appearance in the sport as well as the Games. Both divers competed in the platform events. Onnela advanced to the final, finishing 5th; this matched the best result for a Finnish diver to date. Lampila came in 4th in his preliminary group, just outside the top 3 required to advance.

Diver	Event	Semifinals			Final		
Diver	Event	Points	Score	Rank	Points	Score	Rank
Yrjö Lampila	Men's 10 metre platform	21	72.34	4	did not advance		
Greta Onnela	Women's 10 metre platform	21	28.00	3 Q	25	26.00	5

=== Swimming ===
One swimmer, Disa Lindberg, represented Finland in 1928. It was the nation's 5th appearance in swimming as well as the Games, and the first time since 1912 Finland had sent a female swimmer. Lindberg competed in the 400 metre freestyle, placing 4th in her heat and not advancing to the semifinals.

Swimmer	Event	Heat		Semifinal		Final	
Swimmer	Event	Time	Rank	Time	Rank	Time	Rank
Disa Lindberg	Women's 400 m freestyle	Unknown	4	did not advance			

== Athletics ==
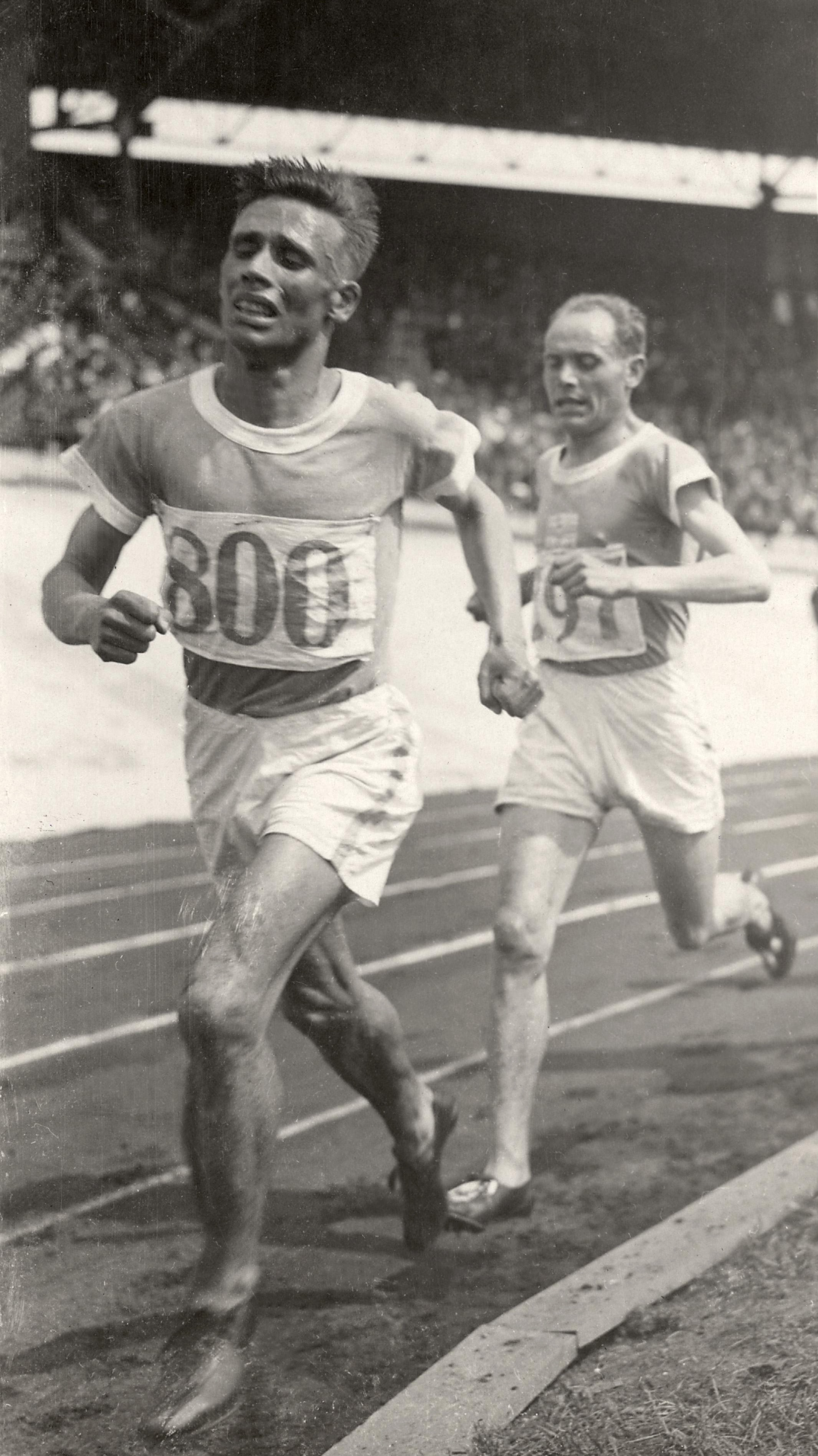
Ville Ritola and Paavo Nurmi

Key

- Note–Ranks given for track events are within the athlete's heat only
- Q = Qualified for the next round
- q = Qualified for the next round as a fastest loser or, in field events, by position without achieving the qualifying target
- NR = National record
- N/A = Round not applicable for the event
- Bye = Athlete not required to compete in round

Men
Track & road events

Athlete	Event	Heat		Quarterfinal		Semifinal		Final	
Athlete	Event	Result	Rank	Result	Rank	Result	Rank	Result	Rank
Risto Mattila	100 metres	11.3	4	Did Not Advance					
Armas Kinnunen	1500 metres	4:01.5	3	—N/a				Did Not Advance	
Armas Kinnunen	5000 metres	—N/a				15:10.8	2	15:02.0	6
Eino Purje	1500 metres	4:00.8	1	—N/a				3:56.4	3rd place, bronze medalist(s)
Eino Purje	5000 metres	—N/a				15:03.6	3	DNF	
Harri Larva	1500 metres	4:02.0	2	—N/a				3:53.2	1st place, gold medalist(s)
Leo Helgas	1500 metres	4:06.0	4	—N/a				Did Not Advance	
Paavo Nurmi	5000 metres	—N/a				15:08.0	4	14:40.0	2nd place, silver medalist(s)
Paavo Nurmi	10,000 metres	—N/a						30:18.8	1st place, gold medalist(s)
Paavo Nurmi	3000 metres steeplechase	9:58.8	1	—N/a				9:31.2	2nd place, silver medalist(s)
Ville Ritola	10,000 metres	—N/a						30:19.4	2nd place, silver medalist(s)
Ville Ritola	5000 metres	—N/a				15:10.8	2	14:38.0	1st place, gold medalist(s)
Ville Ritola	3000 metres steeplechase	9:46.6	1	—N/a				DNF	
Kalle Matilainen	10,000 metres	—N/a						31:45.0	8
Toivo Loukola	10,000 metres	—N/a						31:39.0	7
Toivo Loukola	3000 metres steeplechase	9:37.6	1	—N/a				9:21.8	1st place, gold medalist(s)
Ove Andersen	3000 metres steeplechase		2	—N/a				9:35.6	3rd place, bronze medalist(s)
Bengt Sjöstedt	110 metres hurdles	15.0	2	—N/a		15.1	4	Did Not Advance	
Juka Matilainen	400 metres hurdles	56.7	3	—N/a		Did Not Advance			
Errka Wilén	400 metres hurdles	56.5	2	—N/a		54.5	5	Did Not Advance	
Martti Marttelin	marathon	—N/a						2:35:02	3rd place, bronze medalist(s)
Yrjö Korholin-Koski	marathon	—N/a						2:36:40	7
Verner Laaksonen	marathon	—N/a						2:41:35	12
Eino Rastas	marathon	—N/a						2:43:08	14
Väinö Sipilä	marathon	—N/a						2:43:08	14
Ilmari Kuokka	marathon	—N/a						2:46:34	24

Field events

Athlete	Event	Qualification		Final	
Athlete	Event	Distance	Position	Distance	Position
Toimi Tulikoura	long jump	6.91	18	Did Not Advance	
Ville Tuulos	long jump	7.11	11	Did Not Advance	
Ville Tuulos	triple jump	14.73	4	15.11	3rd place, bronze medalist(s)
Toimi Tulikoura	triple jump	14.70	5	14.70	5
Erkki Järvinen	triple jump	14.65	6	14.65	6
Väinö Rainio	triple jump	14.41	8	Did Not Advance	
Paavo Yrjölä	high jump	1.77	19	Did Not Advance	
Armas Wahlstedt	high jump	No height	-	Did Not Advance	
Armas Wahlstedt	shot put	14.69	5	14.69	5
Paavo Yrjölä	shot put	14.01	9	Did Not Advance	
Antero Kivi	discus throw	45.79	3	47.23	2nd place, silver medalist(s)
Eino Kenttä	discus throw	44.17	6	44.17	6
Heikki Taskinen	discus throw	43.00	11	Did Not Advance	
Vilho Rinne	javelin throw	58.04	15	Did Not Advance	
Albert Lamppu	javelin throw	61.45	9	Did Not Advance	
Paavo Liettu	javelin throw	63.86	4	63.86	4
Eino Penttilä	javelin throw	63.20	6	63.20	6
Erik Eriksson	hammer throw	46.22	9	Did Not Advance	

Combined events – Decathlon

Athlete	Event	100 m	LJ	SP	HJ	400 m	110H	DT	PV	JT	1500 m	Final	Rank
Akilles Järvinen	Result	11.2	6.87	13.64	1.75	51.4	15.6	36.95	3.30	55.58	4:52.4	-	2nd place, silver medalist(s)
Akilles Järvinen	Points	857.2	821.15	830	748	879.68	943	686.12	649	850.95	666.4	7,931.500	2nd place, silver medalist(s)
Akilles Järvinen	Adjusted Points	765	783	706	585	745	751	604	431	672	604	6645	2nd place, silver medalist(s)
Paavo Yrjölä	Result	11.8	6.72	14.11	1.87	53.2	16.6	42.09	3.30	55.70	4:44.0	-	1st place, gold medalist(s)
Paavo Yrjölä	Points	714.4	784.40	877	916	812	848	881.44	649	854.25	716.8	8,053.290	1st place, gold medalist(s)
Paavo Yrjölä	Adjusted Points	643	748	735	687	667	641	707	431	673	655	6587	1st place, gold medalist(s)
Armas Wahlstedt	Result	11.8	5.86	DNF									
Armas Wahlstedt	Points	714.4	573.70	DNF									
Armas Wahlstedt	Adjusted Points	643	556	DNF									
Martti Tolamo	Result	12.0	6.69	11.31	1.70	52.4	18.0	32.88	3.10	45.79	4:44.8	-	16
Martti Tolamo	Points	666.8	777.05	597	678	842.08	715	531.46	541	581.725	712.0	6,642.115	16
Martti Tolamo	Adjusted Points	605	741	565	544	701	501	521	381	527	650	5736	16

== Boxing ==
Three boxers represented Finland in 1928. The sport was open to men only. It was the nation's first time competing in Olympic boxing. Two boxers, Hellström and Väkevä, advanced to the quarterfinals before being defeated; each had a first-round bye and won his second-round match. The third, Resko, did not have a bye and lost his first-round bout.

Boxer	Event	Round of 32	Round of 16	Quarterfinals	Semifinals	Final / Bronze match	
Boxer	Event	Opposition Result	Opposition Result	Opposition Result	Opposition Result	Opposition Result	Rank
Kaarlo Väkevä	Men's featherweight	Bye	Raúl Talán (MEX); W points	Harold Devine (USA); L points	did not advance		5
Valle Resko	Men's lightweight	Pascual Bonfiglio (ARG); L points	did not advance				17
Johan Hellström	Men's welterweight	Bye	Fred Ellis (RSA); W points	Robert Galataud (FRA); L points	did not advance		5

== Cycling ==
One male cyclist represented Finland in 1928. It was the nation's third appearance in the sport. Hellberg finished 10th place in the road race.

=== Road cycling ===
Cyclist	Event	Time	Rank
Raul Hellberg	Men's road race	5:09:14	10

== Equestrian ==
A single equestrian represented Finland in 1928. It was the nation's 3rd appearance in the sport. Von Essen placed 5th in the individual eventing, improving on Finland's best equestrian result.

=== Eventing ===
Equestrian	Horse	Event	Final	
Equestrian	Horse	Event	Score	Rank
Hans Olof von Essen	El Kaid	Eventing	1924.64	5

== Fencing ==
Two fencers, both men, represented Finland in 1928. It was the nation's debut appearance in the sport.

Fencer	Event	Round 1		Quarterfinals		Semifinals		Final	
Fencer	Event	Result	Rank	Result	Rank	Result	Rank	Result	Rank
Torvald Appelroth	Men's épée	2 wins	9	did not advance					
Lauri Kettunen	Men's épée	2 wins	8	did not advance					
Torvald Appelroth	Men's foil	—N/a		1 win	6	did not advance			

== Gymnastics ==
Eight gymnasts, all men, represented Finland in 1928. It was the nation's 4th appearance in the sport. Nyberg-Noroma and Savolainen tied for 6th in the all-around, Finland's best individual all-around results to that point. Savolainen won a bronze medal in the pommel horse apparatus. Finland finished 5th in the team all-around.

=== Artistic gymnastics ===
Gymnast	Event	Score	Rank
Kalervo Kinos	Men's all-around	185.375	62
Urho Korhonen	Men's all-around	209.875	46
Jaakko Kunnas	Men's all-around	217.500	38
Mauri Nyberg-Noroma	Men's all-around	243.750	6
Heikki Savolainen	Men's all-around	243.750	6
Birger Stenman	Men's all-around	179.750	66
Martti Uosikkinen	Men's all-around	231.875	23
Rafael Ylönen	Men's all-around	188.750	61
Kalervo Kinos	Men's team all-around	1609.250	5
Urho Korhonen	Men's team all-around	1609.250	5
Jaakko Kunnas	Men's team all-around	1609.250	5
Mauri Nyberg-Noroma	Men's team all-around	1609.250	5
Heikki Savolainen	Men's team all-around	1609.250	5
Birger Stenman	Men's team all-around	1609.250	5
Martti Uosikkinen	Men's team all-around	1609.250	5
Rafael Ylönen	Men's team all-around	1609.250	5
Kalervo Kinos	Men's horizontal bar	45.25	55
Urho Korhonen	Men's horizontal bar	51.25	33
Jaakko Kunnas	Men's horizontal bar	51.25	33
Mauri Nyberg-Noroma	Men's horizontal bar	54.00	16
Heikki Savolainen	Men's horizontal bar	54.50	13
Birger Stenman	Men's horizontal bar	47.25	48
Martti Uosikkinen	Men's horizontal bar	54.00	16
Rafael Ylönen	Men's horizontal bar	49.50	39
Kalervo Kinos	Men's parallel bars	43.75	49
Urho Korhonen	Men's parallel bars	46.75	40
Jaakko Kunnas	Men's parallel bars	49.50	32
Mauri Nyberg-Noroma	Men's parallel bars	53.50	7
Heikki Savolainen	Men's parallel bars	51.75	17
Birger Stenman	Men's parallel bars	43.75	49
Martti Uosikkinen	Men's parallel bars	51.00	21
Rafael Ylönen	Men's parallel bars	34.00	74
Kalervo Kinos	Men's pommel horse	27.00	85
Urho Korhonen	Men's pommel horse	36.75	71
Jaakko Kunnas	Men's pommel horse	42.25	57
Mauri Nyberg-Noroma	Men's pommel horse	54.50	7
Heikki Savolainen	Men's pommel horse	56.50	3rd place, bronze medalist(s)
Birger Stenman	Men's pommel horse	20.25	87
Martti Uosikkinen	Men's pommel horse	49.50	31
Rafael Ylönen	Men's pommel horse	35.00	72
Kalervo Kinos	Men's rings	42.50	62
Urho Korhonen	Men's rings	49.75	33
Jaakko Kunnas	Men's rings	50.00	32
Mauri Nyberg-Noroma	Men's rings	55.00	5
Heikki Savolainen	Men's rings	53.75	12
Birger Stenman	Men's rings	43.00	60
Martti Uosikkinen	Men's rings	52.50	18
Rafael Ylönen	Men's rings	45.00	56
Kalervo Kinos	Men's vault	26.875	24
Urho Korhonen	Men's vault	25.375	43
Jaakko Kunnas	Men's vault	24.500	54
Mauri Nyberg-Noroma	Men's vault	26.750	26
Heikki Savolainen	Men's vault	27.250	16
Birger Stenman	Men's vault	25.125	46
Martti Uosikkinen	Men's vault	26.875	24
Rafael Ylönen	Men's vault	25.250	45

== Modern pentathlon ==
Three pentathletes, all men, represented Finland in 1928. It was the nation's 3rd appearance in the sport.

Pentathlete	Event	Shooting	Swimming	Fencing	Running	Equestrian	Total	
Pentathlete	Event	Rank	Rank	Rank	Rank	Rank	Score	Rank
Henrik Avellan	Men's individual	31	17	16	15	4	83	15
Lauri Kettunen	Men's individual	20	22	18	10	11	81	13
Tauno Lampola	Men's individual	35	3	31	2	18	89	21

== Sailing ==
One sailor represented Finland in 1928. It was the nation's 3rd appearance in the sport. Broman won the bronze medal in the 12' dinghy class, finishing 1st in two of the first four races to tie Sweden's Sven Thorell and Norway's Henrik Robert for the lead after the preliminary round (using the final round scoring system, rather than the preliminary round's point-for-place system). The other two men each won at least one of the final four races, however, and Broman did not; his two 2nd-place finishes kept him ahead of Willem de Vries Lentsch of the Netherlands.

Dinghy

Sailor	Event	Preliminary series				Net points	Prelim rank	Final series				Results	Rank
Sailor	Event	1	2	3	4	Net points	Prelim rank	1	2	3	4	Results	Rank
Bertil Broman	12' Dinghy	1	2	10	1	14	4	3	9	2	6	2 x 1st 2 x 2nd	3rd place, bronze medalist(s)

== Wrestling ==
In the first year that wrestling was limited to 1 competitor per NOC per event, Finland sent 13 wrestlers—one in each event. The sport was open to men only. It was the nation's 5th appearance in the sport as well as the Games. Finland continued its strong performance in wrestling, topping the medal table for the 4th straight Olympics. Finland matched Sweden for most gold medals at 3 and more than doubled Sweden and Germany in total medals, 9 to 4.

=== Freestyle wrestling ===
The Finnish freestyle wrestling team had numerous Olympic veterans. Haavisto, who had taken bronze in lightweight in 1924, won gold at welterweight this time. Mäkinen, a third-time Olympian, also improved upon his 1924 medal (silver) with a gold medal in 1928. Pihlajamäki was unable to defend his 1924 gold, moving up in weight class from bantam to featherweight and moving down in medal from gold to silver. Leino received his third medal: gold in 1920, silver in 1924, and now bronze in 1928. The 1924 middleweight bronze medalist Pekkala reached the semifinals, but ultimately finished 7th because the man he lost to did not medal.

The wrestlers in the two heaviest weight classes were new Olympians. Rosenqvist lost in the first round and placed 6th in the light heavyweight. Sihvola also lost in the first round, but because his opponent went on to win the gold medal, Sihvola wrestled in—and won—the silver medal tournament.

Wrestler	Event	Gold medal rounds				Silver medal rounds		Bronze medal rounds		Rank
Wrestler	Event	Round of 16	Quarterfinals	Semifinals	Final	Semifinals	Final	Semifinals	Final	Rank
Wrestler	Event	Opposition Result	Opposition Result	Opposition Result	Opposition Result	Opposition Result	Opposition Result	Opposition Result	Opposition Result	Rank
Arvo Haavisto	Men's welterweight	Bye	Morris (AUS); W	Jourlin (FRA); W	Appleton (USA); W	Already ranked		Already ranked		1st place, gold medalist(s)
Eino Leino	Men's lightweight	MacKenzie (GBR); W	Pacôme (FRA); L	did not advance		Not qualified		—N/a	Nilsen (NOR); W	3rd place, bronze medalist(s)
Kaarlo Mäkinen	Men's bantamweight	—N/a	Sansum (GBR); W	Spapen (BEL); W	Hewitt (USA); W	Already ranked		Already ranked		1st place, gold medalist(s)
Vilho Pekkala	Men's middleweight	Bye	Deniel (FRA); W	Hammonds (USA); L	Did not advance	Not qualified		Not qualified		7
Kustaa Pihlajamäki	Men's featherweight	Bye	Rottenfluc (FRA); W	Morrison (USA); L	Did not advance	Bye	Minder (SUI); W	Already ranked		2nd place, silver medalist(s)
Edil Rosenqvist	Men's light heavyweight	—N/a	Edwards (USA); L	did not advance		Not qualified		Not qualified		6
Aukusti Sihvola	Men's heavyweight	—N/a	Richthoff (SWE); L	did not advance		George (USA); W	Dame (FRA); W	Already ranked		2nd place, silver medalist(s)

=== Greco-Roman wrestling ===
Kokkinen completed the rare feat of earning zero bad points throughout the competition, winning all 5 of his bouts by fall to earn the gold medal. Nyström took a silver medal, falling to the eventual gold medalist in the first round but managing to keep his bad points under 5 until the last round. Two veterans, Pellinen (bronze in 1924) and Westerlund (gold in 1924) earned bronze medals. Two others, Ahlfors and Toivola (each silver medalists in 1924) were unable to earn medals.

Athlete	Event	Round 1	Round 2	Round 3	Round 4	Round 5	Round 6	Round 7	Rank
Athlete	Event	Opposition Result	Opposition Result	Opposition Result	Opposition Result	Opposition Result	Opposition Result	Opposition Result	Rank
Anselm Ahlfors	Men's bantamweight	Gozzi (ITA); L Decision 3pts	Mollin (BEL); W Fall 3pts	Aria (FRA); W Decision 4pts	Zombori (HUN); L Decision 7pts	did not advance		—N/a	8
Väinö Kokkinen	Men's middleweight	Bye	Johansson (SWE); W Fall 0pts	Walzer (ARG); W Fall 0pts	Hala (TCH); W Fall 0pts	Papp (HUN); W Fall 0pts	Jacobsen (DEN); W Fall 0pts	—N/a	1st place, gold medalist(s)
Hjalmar Nyström	Men's heavyweight	Svensson (SWE); L Decision 3pts	Badó (HUN); W Fall 3pts	Wiesberger (AUT); W Decision 4pts	Çoban (TUR); W Fall 4pts	Bye	Gehring (GER); W Decision 5pts	—N/a	2nd place, silver medalist(s)
Onni Pellinen	Men's light heavyweight	Westergren (SWE); W Decision 1pt	Pohla (EST); W Decision 2pts	Pētersons (LAT); W Fall 2pts	Szalay (HUN); W Fall 2pts	Moustafa (EGY); L Decision 5pts	Did not advance	—N/a	3rd place, bronze medalist(s)
Aleksanteri Toivola	Men's featherweight	Nolten (NED); W Fall 0pts	Mollet (FRA); W Fall 0pts	Malmberg (SWE); L Decision 3pts	Steinig (GER); L Decision 6pts	did not advance			6
Edvard Westerlund	Men's lightweight	Barbieri (ARG); W Fall 0pts	Bye	Pedersen (NOR); W Fall 0pts	Keresztes (HUN); L Decision 3pts	Massop (NED); W Decision 4pts	Sperling (GER); L Decision 7pts	Yalaz (TUR); W Decision 8pts	3rd place, bronze medalist(s)
