= Wrestling at the 1928 Summer Olympics – Men's Greco-Roman lightweight =

Men's lightweight Greco-Roman wrestling at the Games of the IX Olympiad
- Venue: Krachtsportgebouw
- Dates: August 2–5, 1928
- Competitors: 19 from 19 nations

Medalists
1st place, gold medalist(s)		Lajos Keresztes	Hungary
2nd place, silver medalist(s)		Ede Sperling	Germany
3rd place, bronze medalist(s)		Edvard Westerlund	Finland

The men's Greco-Roman lightweight was one of thirteen wrestling events held as part of the wrestling at the 1928 Summer Olympics programme. The competition was held from August 2 to 5, and featured 20 wrestlers from 20 nations. Lightweight was the third-lightest category, including wrestlers weighing 62 to 67.5 kilograms (136.7 to 148.8 lb).

== Competition format ==
This Greco-Roman wrestling competition introduced an elimination system based on the accumulation of points. Each round featured all wrestlers pairing off and wrestling one bout (with one wrestler having a bye if there were an odd number). The loser received 3 points. The winner received 1 point if the win was by decision and 0 points if the win was by fall. At the end of each round, any wrestler with at least 5 points was eliminated.

== Results ==
=== Round 1 ===
The first round produced 5 winners by fall (0 points), 1 bye (0 points), 4 winners by decision (1 point), and 9 losers (3 points). Parisel and Metzner-Fritz withdrew after their bouts.

Bouts

Winner	Nation	Victory Type	Loser	Nation
Lajos Keresztes	Hungary	Fall	Adolphe Dumont	Luxembourg
Walter Massop	Netherlands	Decision	Miroslav Metzner-Fritz	Yugoslavia
Einar Borges	Denmark	Decision	Ernst Mumenthaler	Switzerland
Frits Janssens	Belgium	Fall	Paul Parisel	France
Vladimír Vávra	Czechoslovakia	Fall	Ede Sperling	Germany
Osvald Käpp	Estonia	Fall	Piero Postini	Italy
Harald Pettersson	Sweden	Decision	Vasilios Pavlidis	Greece
Tayyar Yalaz	Turkey	Decision	Ryszard Błażyca	Poland
Edvard Westerlund	Finland	Fall	Alberto Barbieri	Argentina
Karl Pedersen	Norway	Bye	N/A	N/A

Points

Rank	Wrestler	Nation	R1
1	Frits Janssens	Belgium	0
1	Osvald Käpp	Estonia	0
1	Lajos Keresztes	Hungary	0
1	Karl Pedersen	Norway	0
1	Vladimír Vávra	Czechoslovakia	0
1	Edvard Westerlund	Finland	0
7	Einar Borges	Denmark	1
7	Walter Massop	Netherlands	1
7	Harald Pettersson	Sweden	1
7	Tayyar Yalaz	Turkey	1
11	Alberto Barbieri	Argentina	3
11	Ryszard Błażyca	Poland	3
11	Adolphe Dumont	Luxembourg	3
11	Ernst Mumenthaler	Switzerland	3
11	Vasilios Pavlidis	Greece	3
11	Piero Postini	Italy	3
11	Ede Sperling	Germany	3
18	Miroslav Metzner-Fritz	Yugoslavia	3*
18	Paul Parisel	France	3*

=== Round 2 ===
Vávra and Westerlund were the only 2 out of the 6 men who started with 0 points to finish with 0 points, Westerlund with a bye and Vávra with a second win by fall. Five men were 2–0 with a win by decision and a win by fall for 1 point apiece. Pedersen, with a first-round bye, lost in the second round for 3 points. Also at 3 points were Błażyca and Sperling, who won by fall in round 2 after losing in round 1. Borges and Pettersson each received their first loss after winning by decision in round 1, for 4 points apiece. Five of the 7 wrestlers who had lost in round 1 lost again in round 2 and were eliminated.

Bouts

Winner	Nation	Victory Type	Loser	Nation
Lajos Keresztes	Hungary	Decision	Karl Pedersen	Norway
Walter Massop	Netherlands	Fall	Adolphe Dumont	Luxembourg
Frits Janssens	Belgium	Decision	Einar Borges	Denmark
Vladimír Vávra	Czechoslovakia	Fall	Ernst Mumenthaler	Switzerland
Ede Sperling	Germany	Fall	Piero Postini	Italy
Osvald Käpp	Estonia	Decision	Harald Pettersson	Sweden
Tayyar Yalaz	Turkey	Fall	Vasilios Pavlidis	Greece
Ryszard Błażyca	Poland	Fall	Alberto Barbieri	Argentina
Edvard Westerlund	Finland	Bye	N/A	N/A

Points

Rank	Wrestler	Nation	R1	R2	Total
1	Vladimír Vávra	Czechoslovakia	0	0	0
1	Edvard Westerlund	Finland	0	0	0
3	Frits Janssens	Belgium	0	1	1
3	Osvald Käpp	Estonia	0	1	1
3	Lajos Keresztes	Hungary	0	1	1
3	Walter Massop	Netherlands	1	0	1
3	Tayyar Yalaz	Turkey	1	0	1
8	Ryszard Błażyca	Poland	3	0	3
8	Karl Pedersen	Norway	0	3	3
8	Ede Sperling	Germany	3	0	3
11	Einar Borges	Denmark	1	3	4
11	Harald Pettersson	Sweden	1	3	4
13	Alberto Barbieri	Argentina	3	3	6
13	Adolphe Dumont	Luxembourg	3	3	6
13	Ernst Mumenthaler	Switzerland	3	3	6
13	Piero Postini	Italy	3	3	6
13	Vasilios Pavlidis	Greece	3	3	6

=== Round 3 ===
All 6 bouts in round 3 were won by fall, so all of the winners stayed at the same point score: Vávra and Westerlund at 0, Keresztes and Yalaz at 1, and Błażyca and Sperling at 3. Of the 6 losers, 3 had only had 1 point coming into the round and thus remained in competition with 4 points. Käpp, however, withdrew. The other 3 were eliminated.

Bouts

Winner	Nation	Victory Type	Loser	Nation
Edvard Westerlund	Finland	Fall	Karl Pedersen	Norway
Lajos Keresztes	Hungary	Fall	Walter Massop	Netherlands
Vladimír Vávra	Czechoslovakia	Fall	Einar Borges	Denmark
Ede Sperling	Germany	Fall	Frits Janssens	Belgium
Tayyar Yalaz	Turkey	Fall	Osvald Käpp	Estonia
Ryszard Błażyca	Poland	Fall	Harald Pettersson	Sweden

Points

Rank	Wrestler	Nation	R1	R2	R3	Total
1	Vladimír Vávra	Czechoslovakia	0	0	0	0
1	Edvard Westerlund	Finland	0	0	0	0
3	Lajos Keresztes	Hungary	0	1	0	1
3	Tayyar Yalaz	Turkey	1	0	0	1
5	Ryszard Błażyca	Poland	3	0	0	3
5	Ede Sperling	Germany	3	0	0	3
7	Frits Janssens	Belgium	0	1	3	4
7	Walter Massop	Netherlands	1	0	3	4
9	Osvald Käpp	Estonia	0	1	3	4*
10	Karl Pedersen	Norway	0	3	3	6
11	Einar Borges	Denmark	1	3	3	7
11	Harald Pettersson	Sweden	1	3	3	7

=== Round 4 ===
Vávra and Westerlund, who started the round with 0 points, each lost to finish the round with 3 points and in 3rd place. Yalaz, who defeated Vávra, took over the lead at 1 point which he had gained in the first round before reeling off 3 wins by fall. Keresztes picked up a 2nd point in his defeat of Westerlund. Sperling won by fall to stay at 3 points and eliminate Błażyca; Massop did the same to stay at 4 and eliminate Janssens.

Bouts

Winner	Nation	Victory Type	Loser	Nation
Lajos Keresztes	Hungary	Decision	Edvard Westerlund	Finland
Walter Massop	Netherlands	Fall	Frits Janssens	Belgium
Tayyar Yalaz	Turkey	Fall	Vladimír Vávra	Czechoslovakia
Ede Sperling	Germany	Fall	Ryszard Błażyca	Poland

Points

Rank	Wrestler	Nation	R1	R2	R3	R4	Total
1	Tayyar Yalaz	Turkey	1	0	0	0	1
2	Lajos Keresztes	Hungary	0	1	0	1	2
3	Ede Sperling	Germany	3	0	0	0	3
3	Vladimír Vávra	Czechoslovakia	0	0	0	3	3
3	Edvard Westerlund	Finland	0	0	0	3	3
6	Walter Massop	Netherlands	1	0	3	0	4
7	Ryszard Błażyca	Poland	3	0	0	3	6
8	Frits Janssens	Belgium	0	1	3	3	7

=== Round 5 ===
The leader lost again, this time Yalaz falling to Sperling. Keresztes took the lead with 2 points. Sperling followed with 3. Yalaz remained in competition at 4 points, as did Westerlund who picked up his 4th in a win by decision. Vávra, after leading with 0 points through round 3, had a second consecutive loss in round 5 and was eliminated. Massop also took his second loss and was eliminated.

Bouts

Winner	Nation	Victory Type	Loser	Nation
Edvard Westerlund	Finland	Decision	Walter Massop	Netherlands
Lajos Keresztes	Hungary	Fall	Vladimír Vávra	Czechoslovakia
Ede Sperling	Germany	Fall	Tayyar Yalaz	Turkey

Points

Rank	Wrestler	Nation	R1	R2	R3	R4	R5	Total
1	Lajos Keresztes	Hungary	0	1	0	1	0	2
2	Ede Sperling	Germany	3	0	0	0	0	3
3	Edvard Westerlund	Finland	0	0	0	3	1	4
3	Tayyar Yalaz	Turkey	1	0	0	0	3	4
5	Vladimír Vávra	Czechoslovakia	0	0	0	3	3	6
6	Walter Massop	Netherlands	1	0	3	0	3	7

=== Round 6 ===
Keresztes maintained his lead, defeating Yalaz and eliminating the latter. Sperling won over Westerlund to stay in competition as well, with Westerlund eliminated. Because Westerlund and Yalaz both finished with 7 points, they would need to wrestle each other for the bronze while Sperling and Keresztes contested the gold medal.

Bouts

Winner	Nation	Victory Type	Loser	Nation
Ede Sperling	Germany	Decision	Edvard Westerlund	Finland
Lajos Keresztes	Hungary	Fall	Tayyar Yalaz	Turkey

Points

Rank	Wrestler	Nation	R1	R2	R3	R4	R5	R6	Total
1	Lajos Keresztes	Hungary	0	1	0	1	0	0	2
2	Ede Sperling	Germany	3	0	0	0	0	1	4
3	Edvard Westerlund	Finland	0	0	0	3	1	3	7
3	Tayyar Yalaz	Turkey	1	0	0	0	3	3	7

=== Round 7 ===
Keresztes defeated Sperling for the gold medal. Westerlund prevailed over Yalaz for the bronze.

Bronze medal bout

Winner	Nation	Victory Type	Loser	Nation
Edvard Westerlund	Finland	Decision	Tayyar Yalaz	Turkey

Gold medal bout

Winner	Nation	Victory Type	Loser	Nation
Lajos Keresztes	Hungary	Decision	Ede Sperling	Germany

Points

Rank	Wrestler	Nation	R1	R2	R3	R4	R5	R6	R7	Total
1st place, gold medalist(s)	Lajos Keresztes	Hungary	0	1	0	1	0	0	1	3
2nd place, silver medalist(s)	Ede Sperling	Germany	3	0	0	0	0	1	3	7
3rd place, bronze medalist(s)	Edvard Westerlund	Finland	0	0	0	3	1	3	1	8
4	Tayyar Yalaz	Turkey	1	0	0	0	3	3	3	10
