= Athletics at the 1928 Summer Olympics – Men's discus throw =

Men's discus throw at the Games of the IX Olympiad
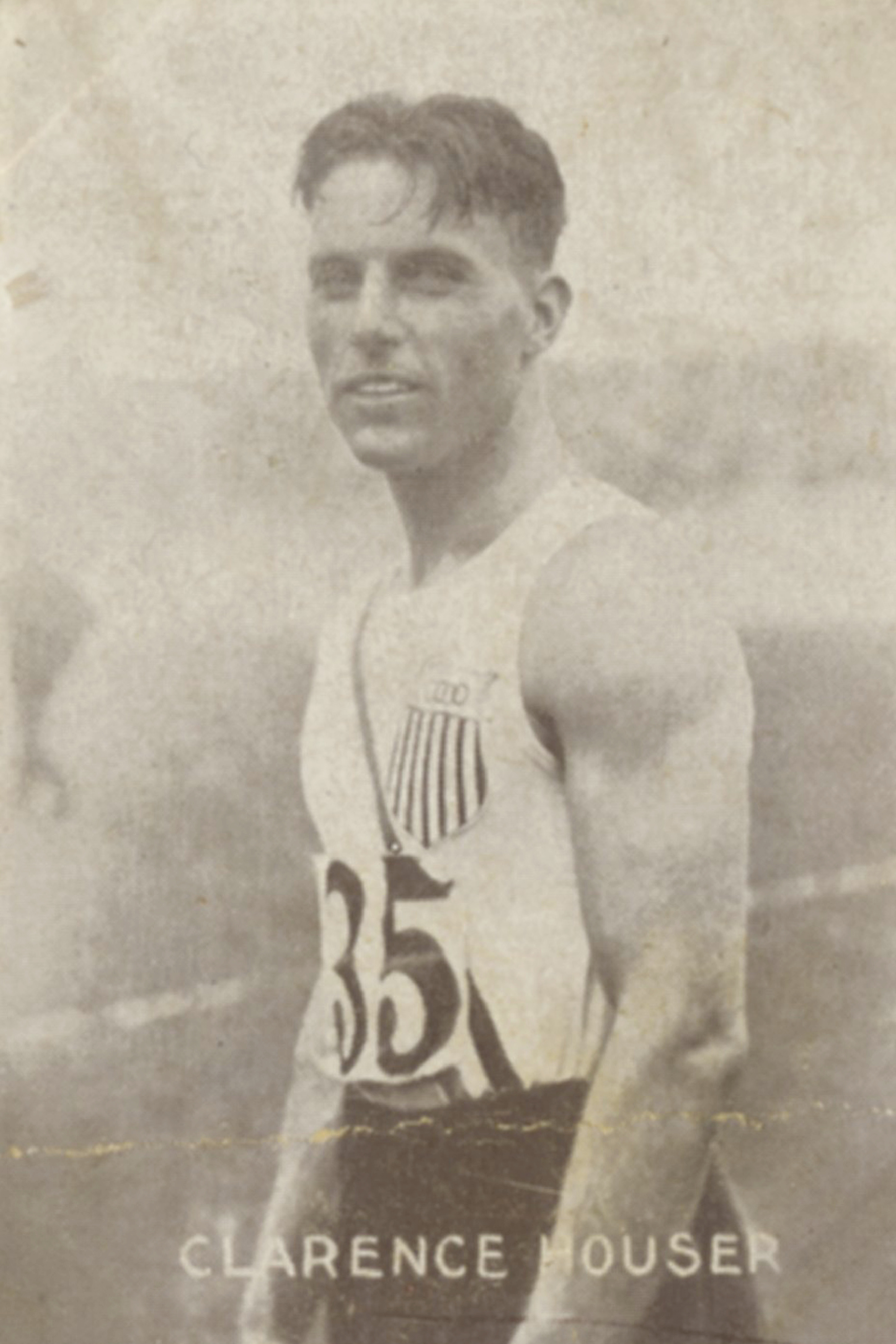
- Bud Houser
- Venue: Olympic Stadium
- Date: August 1, 1928
- Competitors: 34 from 19 nations
- Winning distance: 47.32 OR

Medalists
1st place, gold medalist(s)		Bud Houser; United States
2nd place, silver medalist(s)		Antero Kivi; Finland
3rd place, bronze medalist(s)		James Corson; United States

The men's discus throw event was part of the track and field athletics programme at the 1928 Summer Olympics. The competition was held on Wednesday, August 1, 1928. Thirty-four discus throwers from 19 nations competed. The maximum number of athletes per nation was 4. The event was won by Bud Houser, the second man to successfully defend Olympic gold in the discus throw (after Martin Sheridan). It was the fifth American victory in the event. As in 1924, silver went to Finland (this time by Antero Kivi) and bronze to the United States (James Corson).

== Background ==
This was the eighth appearance of the event, which is one of 12 athletics events to have been held at every Summer Olympics. The returning finalists from 1924 were defending champion Bud Houser of the United States and fifth-place finisher Ketil Askildt of Norway. Houser had also taken the world record in 1926 and was the favorite in this competition.

Chile, Japan, Mexico, the Netherlands, and Romania each made their debut in the men's discus throw. The United States made its eighth appearance, having competed in every edition of the Olympic men's discus throw to date.

== Competition format ==
The competition continued to use the single, divided-final format in use since 1896. Each athlete received three throws, with the top six receiving an additional three throws.

== Records ==
These were the standing world and Olympic records (in metres) prior to the 1928 Summer Olympics.

World record	Bud Houser (USA)	48.20	Palo Alto, United States	2 April 1926
Olympic record	Bud Houser (USA)	46.155	Paris, France	13 July 1924

At first James Corson set a new Olympic record in the second round of the qualification with 47.00 metres. In the third round of the qualification Bud Houser bettered the Olympic record with 47.32 metres.

== Schedule ==
Date	Time	Round
Wednesday, 1 August 1928	14:00	Qualifying; Final

== Results ==
The best six discus throwers qualified for the final. The throwing order is not available and the throwing series are only available for the best six throwers. The final was held on the same day and started at 2 p.m.

Rank	Athlete	Nation	1	2	3	4	5	6	Distance	Notes
1st place, gold medalist(s)	Bud Houser	United States	X	X	47.32 OR	45.00	46.50	43.00	47.32	OR
2nd place, silver medalist(s)	Antero Kivi	Finland	45.30	45.00	45.79	46.00	47.23	42.00	47.23	
3rd place, bronze medalist(s)	James Corson	United States	44.50	47.00 OR	45.00	45.40	46.50	47.10	47.10	
4	Harald Stenerud	Norway	43.00	44.82	43.00	43.50	42.00	45.80	45.80	
5	John Anderson	United States	43.50	44.25	43.00	44.50	44.87	43.00	44.87	
6	Eino Kenttä	Finland	44.17	42.00	43.80	40.50	41.10	42.00	44.17	
7	Ernst Paulus	Germany	Unknown			Did not advance			44.15	
8	Johan Trandem	Norway	Unknown			Did not advance			43.97	
9	Fred Weicker	United States	Unknown			Did not advance			43.81	
10	Gustav Kalkun	Estonia	Unknown			Did not advance			43.09	
11	Heikki Taskinen	Finland	Unknown			Did not advance			43.00	
12	Jānis Jordāns	Latvia	Unknown			Did not advance			42.78	
13	Ketil Askilt	Norway	Unknown			Did not advance			42.57	
14	Hermann Hänchen	Germany	Unknown			Did not advance			42.08	
15	Arturo Conturbia	Switzerland	Unknown			Did not advance			41.90	
16	Kálmán Egri	Hungary	Unknown			Did not advance			41.89	
17	István Donogán	Hungary	Unknown			Did not advance			41.78	
18	Józef Baran-Bilewski	Poland	Unknown			Did not advance			41.77	
19	Albino Pighi	Italy	Unknown			Did not advance			41.42	
20	František Douda	Czechoslovakia	Unknown			Did not advance			41.19	
21	Kálmán Marvalits	Hungary	Unknown			Did not advance			41.17	
22	Jules Noël	France	Unknown			Did not advance			40.23	
23	Camillo Zemi	Italy	Unknown			Did not advance			39.95	
24	Gerrit Eijsker	Netherlands	Unknown			Did not advance			39.80	
25	Hans Hoffmeister	Germany	Unknown			Did not advance			39.17	
26	Héctor Benaprés	Chile	Unknown			Did not advance			38.18	
27	Ichiro Furuyama	Japan	Unknown			Did not advance			37.89	
27	Ion David	Romania	Unknown			Did not advance			37.49	
29	Raoul Paoli	France	Unknown			Did not advance			36.82	
30	Yoshio Okita	Japan	Unknown			Did not advance			36.38	
31	Gerrit Postma	Netherlands	Unknown			Did not advance			35.94	
32	Fred Zinner	Belgium	Unknown			Did not advance			34.35	
33	Jesús Aguirre	Mexico	Unknown			Did not advance			33.21	
34	Dimitrios Karabatis	Greece	Unknown			Did not advance			31.87	
—	António Cardoso	Portugal	DNS							
—	Léon Courtejaire	France	DNS							
—	Alfonso de Gortari	Mexico	DNS							
—	Vladimir Manojilović	Yugoslavia	DNS							
—	A. Nollen	Netherlands	DNS							
—	Daniel Pierre	France	DNS							
—	Vilhelms Rozenbergs	Latvia	DNS							
—	Pál Toth	Hungary	DNS							
—	Paavo Yrjölä	Finland	DNS							
—	Georgios Zacharopoulos	France	DNS							

== Sources ==
- Official Olympic Report
- Wudarski, Pawel (1999). "Wyniki Igrzysk Olimpijskich" (in Polish). Archived from the original on 16 February 2009.
