= Wrestling at the 1928 Summer Olympics – Men's freestyle heavyweight =

Men's heavyweight freestyle wrestling at the Games of the IX Olympiad
- Venue: Krachtsportgebouw
- Dates: July 30–August 1, 1928
- Competitors: 7 from 7 nations

Medalists
1st place, gold medalist(s)		Johan Richthoff	Sweden
2nd place, silver medalist(s)		Aukusti Sihvola	Finland
3rd place, bronze medalist(s)		Edmond Dame	France

The men's freestyle heavyweight was a freestyle wrestling event held as part of the Wrestling at the 1928 Summer Olympics programme. It was the fifth appearance of the event. Heavyweight was the heaviest category, including wrestlers weighing over 87 kilograms.

== Results ==
Source: Official results; Wudarski

=== Gold medal round ===
Quarterfinals		Semifinals		Final
Edward George (USA)	W
Earl McCready (CAN)	L	Edward George (USA)	W
Henri Wernli (SUI)	W	Henri Wernli (SUI)	L
Léon Charlier (BEL)	L			Edward George (USA)	L
Johan Richthoff (SWE)	W			Johan Richthoff (SWE)	W
Aukusti Sihvola (FIN)	L	Johan Richthoff (SWE)	W
		Edmond Dame (FRA)	L

=== Silver medal round ===
Semifinals		Final
Aukusti Sihvola (FIN)	W
Edward George (USA)	L	Aukusti Sihvola (FIN)	W
		Edmond Dame (FRA)	L

=== Bronze medal round ===
Semifinals	Final
	Edmond Dame (FRA)	W
	Edward George (USA)	L
