= Athletics at the 1928 Summer Olympics – Men's 3000 metres steeplechase =

Men's 3000 metres steeplechase at the Games of the IX Olympiad
- Venue: Olympic Stadium
- Dates: August 1, 1928 (heats); August 4, 1928 (final)
- Competitors: 22

Medalists
1st place, gold medalist(s)		Toivo Loukola	Finland
2nd place, silver medalist(s)		Paavo Nurmi	Finland
3rd place, bronze medalist(s)		Ove Andersen	Finland

The men's 3000 metres steeplechase event at the 1928 Olympic Games took place August 1 & August 4.

== Results ==
=== Heats ===
Heat 1

Rank	Athlete	Country	Time	Notes
1	Ville Ritola	Finland	9:46.6	Q
2	Melvin Dalton	United States	9:58.6	Q
3	Nils Eklöf	Sweden		Q
4	Walter Gegan	United States		
5	Henry Oliver	Great Britain		
6	Nello Bartolini	Italy		
7	Jozef Langenus	Belgium		
8	Art Keay	Canada		

Key: Q = Qualified

Heat 2

Rank	Athlete	Country	Time	Notes
1	Paavo Nurmi	Finland	9:58.8	Q
2	Lucien Duquesne	France	9:58.9	Q
3	William Spencer	United States		Q
4	Norman Biddulph	Great Britain		
5	Edgard Viseur	Belgium		
6	Henrique Santos	Portugal		
	Gerry Coughlan	Ireland		DNF

Key: DNF = Did not finish, Q = Qualified

Heat 3

Rank	Athlete	Country	Time	Notes
1	Toivo Loukola	Finland	9:37.6	Q
2	Ove Andersen	Finland		Q
3	Henri Dartigues	France		Q
4	Jean-Gunnar Lindgren	Sweden		
5	Vernon Morgan	Great Britain		
6	Joe Blewitt	Great Britain		
7	Jesse Montgomery	United States		

Key: Q = Qualified

=== Final ===
Rank	Athlete	Country	Time	Notes
1	Toivo Loukola	Finland	9:21.8	WR
2	Paavo Nurmi	Finland	9:31.2	
3	Ove Andersen	Finland	9:35.6	
4	Nils Eklöf	Sweden	9:38.0	
5	Henri Dartigues	France	9:40.0	
6	Lucien Duquesne	France	9:40.5	
7	Melvin Dalton	United States		
8	William Spencer	United States		
	Ville Ritola	Finland		DNF

Key: DNF = Did not finish, WR = World record
