= Henrique Santos =

Henrique Santos may refer to:

- Henrique Santos (runner) (1908-1981), Portuguese middle-distance runner
- Henrique Santos (footballer) (born 1990), Brazilian footballer
