= Haenchen =

Haenchen or Hänchen is a German surname. Notable people with the surname include:

- Ernst Haenchen (1894–1975), German Protestant theologian, professor, and Biblical scholar
- Hartmut Haenchen (born 1943), German conductor
- Hermann Hänchen (1898–????), German athlete
- Hilda Hänchen (1919–2013), German physicist
