= Vernon Morgan =

English athlete

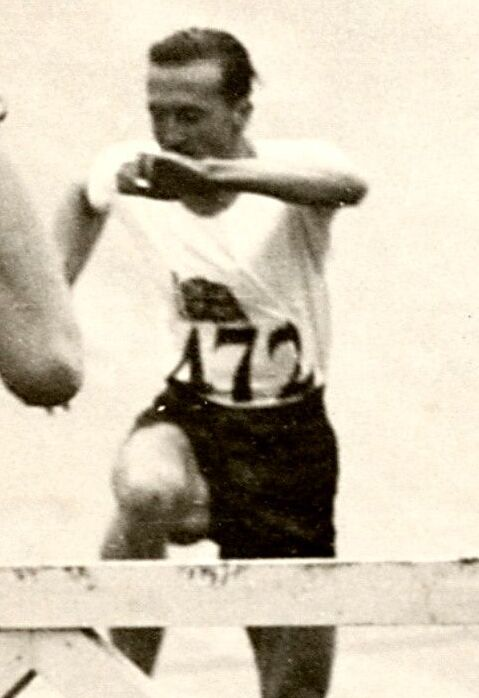

Personal information
- Nationality: British (English)
- Born: 2 May 1904 Bucklow Hill, England
- Died: 23 October 1992 (aged 88) Wisborough Green, England

Sport
- Sport: Athletics
- Event: steeplechase
- Club: University of Oxford AC; Achilles Club
Medal record
Men's athletics
Representing England
British Empire Games
Bronze medal – third place	1930 Hamilton	2 mi steeplechase

Vernon Eversfield Morgan (2 May 1904 – 23 October 1992) was an English athlete who competed at the 1928 Summer Olympics.

== Biography ==
Morgan was born in Bucklow Hill, Cheshire. He finished third behind Jack Webster in the steeplechase event at the 1928 AAA Championships. Shortly afterwards he represented Great Britain at the 1928 Olympic Games in Amsterdam, Netherlands, where he was eliminated in the first round of the 3000 metre steeplechase event.

At the 1929 AAA Championships he finished third behind Henry Oliver in the steeplechase.

At the 1930 British Empire Games he won the bronze medal in the 2 miles steeplechase competition.

He later became sports editor of the global news agency Reuters, a position he held for about 30 years. He died in Wisborough Green aged 88.
