= Viseur =

Viseur is a surname. Notable people with the surname include:

- Edgard Viseur, Belgian middle-distance runner
- Gus Viseur (1915–1974), Belgian/French accordionist
- Suzanne Cesbron-Viseur (1879–1967), French soprano
