= Melvin Dalton =

American steeplechase runner (1906–1983)

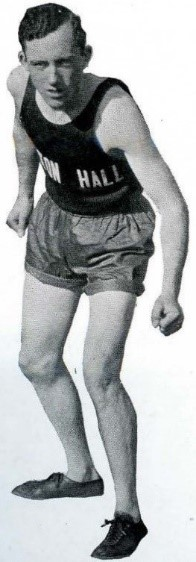

Personal information
- Full name: Melvin Joseph Dalton
- Nationality: American
- Born: March 15, 1906 Newark, New Jersey, United States
- Died: October 13, 1983 (aged 77)

Sport
- Sport: athletics
- Event: steeplechase running

Melvin Joseph Dalton (March 15, 1906 – October 13, 1983) was an American steeplechase runner. He competed in the men's 3000 metres steeplechase at the 1928 Summer Olympics.
