= Ichiro Furuyama =

Japanese discus thrower

Personal information
- Nationality: Japanese
- Born: 8 February 1907

Sport
- Sport: Athletics
- Event: Discus throw

Ichiro Furuyama (古山 一郎, Furuyama Ichirō; born 8 February 1907, date of death unknown) was a Japanese athlete. He competed in the men's discus throw at the 1928 Summer Olympics.
