= Jānis Jordāns =

Latvian athlete

Personal information
- Full name: Jānis Voldemārs Jordāns
- Nationality: Latvian
- Born: 1 October 1888 Kārļu pagasts, Amatas novads
- Died: 25 February 1944 (aged 55)

Sport
- Sport: Athletics
- Event: Discus throw

Jānis Voldemārs Jordāns (1 October 1888 – 25 February 1944) was a Latvian athlete. He competed in the men's discus throw at the 1928 Summer Olympics. He died in a Soviet prison camp during World War II.
