= James Corson =

American athlete and sports coach

Biographical details
- Born: January 14, 1906; Indiana, U.S.
- Died: November 12, 1981 (aged 76); Burlingame, California, U.S.

Playing career

Football
- c. 1925: Pacific (CA)

Track
- c. 1925: Pacific (CA)
- Position: Tackle (football)

Coaching career (HC unless noted)

Football
- 1927–1928: Modesto (assistant)
- 1937: Stockton

Track
- 1927–1929: Modesto (assistant)
- 1929–?: Pacific (CA)

Administrative career (AD unless noted)
- c. 1933: Pacific (CA)
Medal record
Men's athletics
Representing the United States
Bronze medal – third place	1928 Amsterdam	Discus throw

James Hunt Corson (January 14, 1906 – November 12, 1981) was an American track and field athlete and coach, college football player and coach, and educator. He competed for the United States in the 1928 Summer Olympics held in Amsterdam in the discus throw, winning the bronze medal.

Born in 1906, Corson grew up in Modesto, California. He earned his bachelor's degree from the College of the Pacific—now known as University of Pacific—in Stockton, California, where he was a tackle on the Pacific Tigers football team. He also lettered in track at Pacific. In 1927, Corson went to Modesto Junior College as an assistant coach in football and track. He turned to the College of the Pacific in 1929 as varsity track coach and assistant dean of men.

Corson received a master's degree from the University of Southern California (USC) and was the recipient of an honorary doctorate from his alma mater.

Corson coached the football team at Stockton Junior College—now known as San Joaquin Delta College—in 1937. He was the superintendent of Modesto's schools from 1947 to 1960. He served as interim president of Willamette University in 1972–73.

Corson died on November 12, 1981, at a hospital in Burlingame, California. He had suffered a stroke in April of that year and was in declining health before his death.
