= Ethel McGary =

American swimmer (1907–1975)

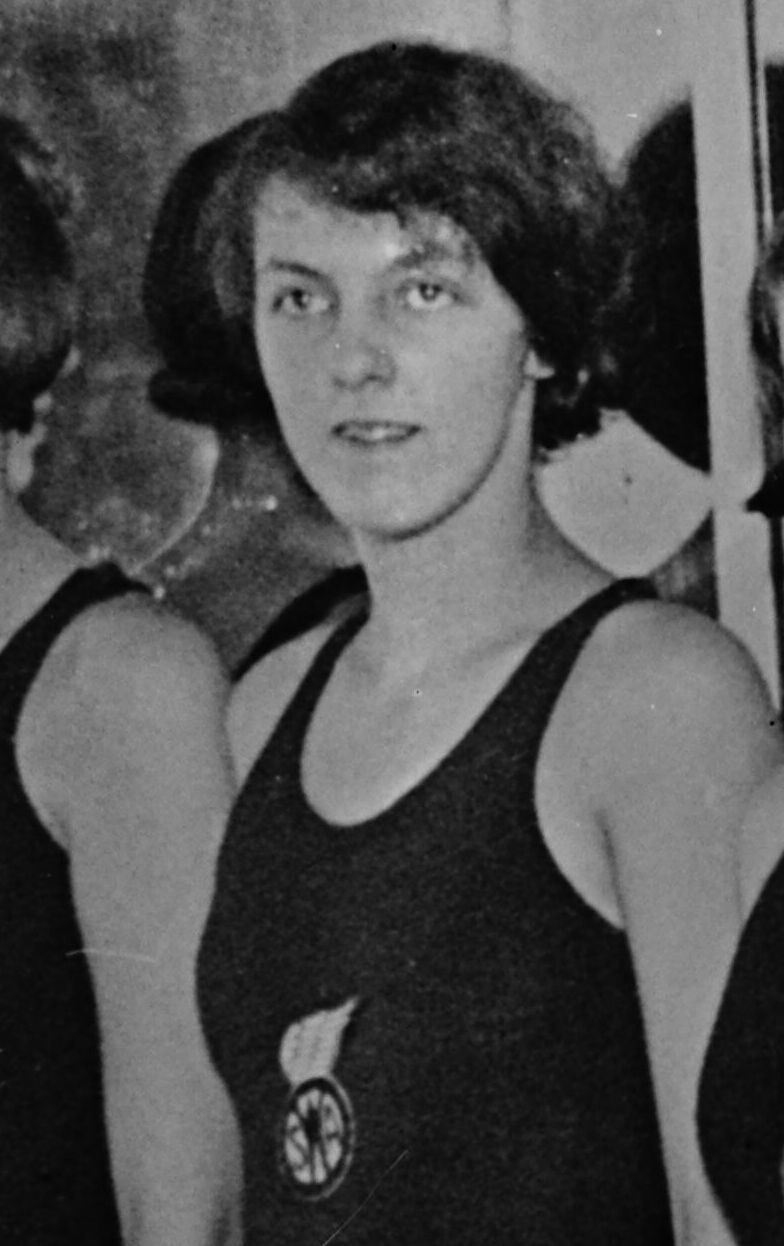
- McGary at age 20 in WSA Swim Jersey, 1927

Personal information
- Full name: Ethel M. McGary
- National team: United States
- Born: October 21, 1907 New York, New York, U.S.
- Died: May 5, 1975 (aged 67) Queens, New York, U.S.
- Education: New York University ('28 B.S.); Columbia University M.A.
- Occupations: Swim Coach; Women's Red Cross Director; Professor, Physical Education
- Spouse: H. Norman Engelson (April 1938)
- Children: 1 daughter

Sport
- Sport: Swimming
- Strokes: Backstroke; Freestyle
- Club: Women's Swimming Association
- College team: New York University (1928)
- Coach: Louis deBreda Handley (WSA); Robert J. H. Kiphuth ('28 Olympics)

Ethel M. McGary (October 21, 1907 – May 5, 1975), also known by her married name Ethel Engelsen after April 1938, was an American competition swimmer and world record holder in the 800 and 1,500 meter freestyle who swam for the Women's Swimming Association (WSA) of New York. She represented the United States in the women's 400-meter freestyle at the 1928 Summer Olympics in Amsterdam. After completing her B.S. from New York University where she competed in swimming, and a Masters from Columbia in Physical Education, she married and worked as a swim coach, and Red Cross administrator. She had a primary career as a Professor of Health and Physical Education, swim coach, and curriculum designer at New York's Hunter College beginning around the mid-1930's.

McGary was born October 21, 1906 in New York, New York. She competed for the Women's Swimming Association under Head Coach Louis deBreda Handley, a 1904 Olympic gold medalist, and Manager Charlotte Epstein.

== New York University ==
McGary attended New York University, graduating with the class of 1928 where she swam representing the school while also competing for the Women's Swimming Association. In 1927, she was granted a letter from NYU in recognition of her swimming achievements. By April 1927, the NYU Women's swimming program had enjoyed a successful year, defeating by large points margins two of their strongest local rivals, the women's swim programs at both Hunter College and Adelphi College. The team lost only one match in the 1927 season, which was to the women's team at Temple University during the Women's Intercollegiate Championships. By 1927, McGary captained the NYU team, and was a consistent scorer in dual meet competitions, averaging two first place finishes in each meet in which she participated. During her swimming career at New York University, she held intercollegiate records in the 50 and 40-yard backstrokes events, and the 100-yard freestyle.

== 1928 Amsterdam Olympics ==
Coached by Head Olympic women's Coach Robert J. H. Kiphuth of Yale University, McGary participated at the 1928 Summer Olympics in the women's 400-meter freestyle on August 4-5. She won Heat 2 of Round 1 with a time of 6:04.6, that would have placed her fourth overall if she had competed in the final round, which she did not. Strong American pre-game favorite American Martha Norelius won the gold with a world record time of 5:42.8, Zus Braun of the Netherlands took the silver with a time of 5:57.8, and fellow American Josephine McKim took the bronze with a time of 6:00.2, just under four seconds ahead of MdGary's time.

=== Competition highlights ===
Although she competed in the 400-meter freestyle in the 1928 Olympics, she was truly more suited to longer lengths. In August 1925, McGary established two world records in the 880 yard free, and in December of that same year, she set a world record in the 1,500 freestyle. McGary set the 1500 meter long course world record of 24.07.06 on December 31, 1925, dropping the former record of Helen Wainwright by a full 59 seconds, the largest reduction in time ever in the event. For the years, 1923, 1925–26, and 1928–29, she won five AAU titles in long-distance swimming. For the one mile swim event, she was the 1925–26 AAU champion. She helped the Women's Swimming Association win the team title at the AAU Long Distance swimming championship in 1927 and 1929–30. With the WSA, McGary won AAU championships in the 4x200-yard relay in 1927-1929 and earlier in 1924–1925. In 1928-1929, she successfully defended her Metropolitan AAU 500 Freestyle title, which she swam in a time of 6:56.8 at the WSA 75-yard pool in April 19, 1929.

An open water distance competitor as well as a pool swimmer, McGary won a 3 1/2 mile swimming championship staged by the A.A.A. at Rockaway Park on September 1, 1923. The swim covered the distance from Fort Tilden to Park Inn Baths, and included nine competitors. Distance champions Gertrude Ederle, who would hold the English Channel record, and Aileen Riggin, would have provided stiff competition, but did not participate though they were registered. McGary, who took the lead early in the race, and was never passed, had a winning time of 1:56:43.

=== Marriage ===
She married H. Norman Engelson at the Church of the Comforter on New York's 162nd Street in April, 1938. Engelson was the Assistant Director of New York's Red Cross Life Saving Corps at the time, and would later work as a Director of the Red Cross for greater New York. Norman Engelsen attended Manual Training High School, Savage School of Physical Education, and New York University where the couple may have met. Engelsen was an accomplished swimmer, like Ethel, and held the Central Branch YMCA swimming championship in 1926-1927, and in 1927 became a title holder in the 100-yard freestyle event in National YMCA competition. Ethel had worked as an Athletic Director at the Park School in Buffalo the prior year and was one of the first women to obtain a life saving certification from the Red Cross. McGary and Norman Engelsen had a daughter Marguerite Ethel Engelsen who married in August, 1969, and later provided them with a grandchild. An educated family, daughter Marguerite obtained a Masters in Statistics from Pennsylvania State University.

=== Education and career ===
In pursuit of her career goals, Ethel McGary Engelsen graduated New York University with a B.S. in 1928 and later obtained a Masters from Columbia University, likely in Physical Education. She served as a Director for the Women's Red Cross in her early career. Beginning around the mid-1930's, she worked as a collegiate swim coach and an Associate Professor in the Health and Physical Education Department at Hunter College, a position from which she retired. Founded in 1870, Hunter was a New York based public University, part of the City University of New York, and remained an All girls school through 1946. In her later years, as an instructor in physical education, McGary contributed to Hunter's Physical Education curriculum. In addition to coaching and teaching responsibilities at Hunter, in April 1948 she directed the water ballet "Alice in Wonderland", held at the Hunter College pool and starring coed Sheila McDonnell who competed in diving for Hunter.

Mirroring the sentiments of WSA founder Charlotte Epstein, McGary became an advocate of opening more endurance swimming events to women, including the Olympics, and championed the belief that such activities promoted women's health without compromising their access to marriage, careers and education. McGary had pursued all three in concert with her successful swimming career.

=== Honors ===
In 1976, she was inducted into the New York University Hall of Fame for her contribution to Women's Swimming and Diving.

McGary died May 5, 1975, at the age of 67 in Queens, New York and was buried in Mount Hope Cemetery. She was survived by her daughter Marguerite Ethel Engelsen Klaiber and predeceased by her husband H. Norman Engelsen in 1970.

== See also ==
- World record progression 800 metres freestyle
- World record progression 1500 metres freestyle

Records
Preceded by Helen Wainwright	Women's 1,500-meter freestyle world record-holder (long course); December 31, 1925 – September 15, 1926	Succeeded by Edith Mayne
