= Riku Korhonen (gymnast) =

Finnish gymnast

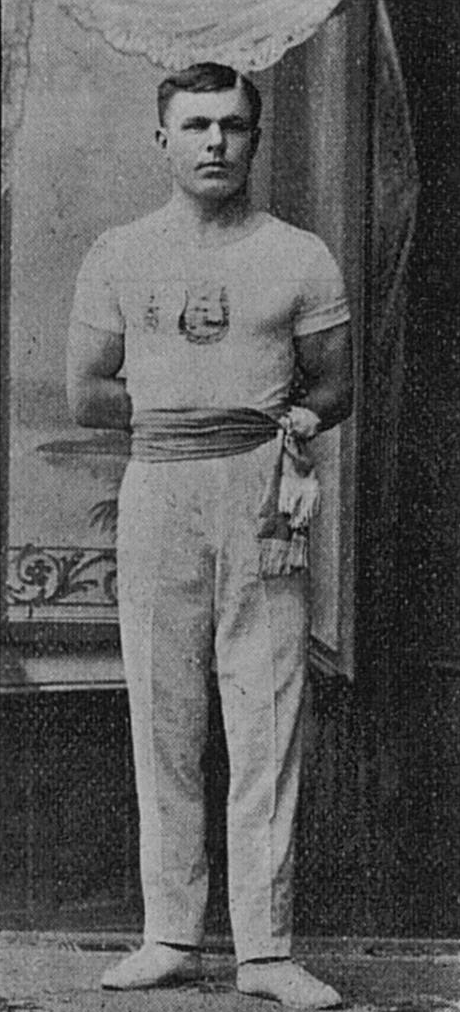
- Korhonen c. 1907

Personal information
- Full name: Aapeli Richard Korhonen
- Born: 29 March 1883 Viipuri, Grand Duchy of Finland, Russian Empire
- Died: 7 January 1932 (aged 48) Viipuri, Finland
- Relatives: Urho Korhonen (son)

Gymnastics career
- Discipline: Men's artistic gymnastics
- Country represented: Finland
- Club: Viipurin Reipas

Aapeli Richard "Riku" Korhonen (29 March 1883 – 7 January 1932) was a Finnish gymnast who competed at the 1908 Summer Olympics.

Riku Korhonen at the Olympic Games
Games	Event	Rank	Notes
1908 Summer Olympics	Artistic individual all-around	75th	He won the rope-climbing discipline.

He was part of the Viipurin Reipas team that won the Finnish gymnastics national championship in 1906. He was nominated into the club's honorary legion.

He was the father of Urho Korhonen, who competed in gymnastics at the 1928 Summer Olympics.

He died of cardiac arrest.
