= Jesse Montgomery =

American runner

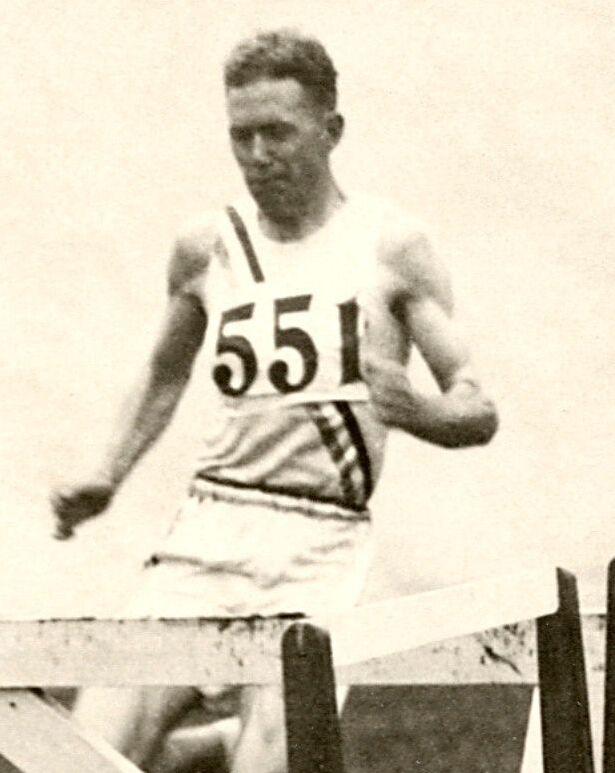

Personal information
- Full name: Jesse Langford Montgomery
- Nationality: American
- Born: July 29, 1904 Lansford, Pennsylvania, U.S.
- Died: November 15, 1976 (aged 72) Port Richey, Florida, U.S.

Sport
- Sport: Middle-distance running
- Event: Steeplechase

Jesse Langford Montgomery (July 29, 1904 – November 15, 1976) was an American middle-distance runner. He competed in the men's 3000 metres steeplechase at the 1928 Summer Olympics.
