= Dora Schönemann =

German swimmer

Personal information
- Born: 30 June 1907 Dresden, Germany

Sport
- Sport: Swimming

Dora Schönemann (born 30 June 1907, date of death unknown) was a German swimmer. She competed in the women's 400 metre freestyle event at the 1928 Summer Olympics. In 1928, Schönemann became the German national champion in the 400m freestyle.
