= Vladimír Vávra =

Czech wrestler

- photo by Vladimír Vávra

Personal information
- Nationality: Czech
- Born: 8 January 1905 Zvánovice, Bohemia, Austria-Hungary
- Died: 26 December 1932 (aged 27) Uhříněves, Czechoslovakia

Sport
- Sport: Wrestling

Vladimír Vávra (8 January 1905 – 26 December 1932) was a Czech wrestler. He competed in the men's Greco-Roman lightweight at the 1928 Summer Olympics. Vávra committed suicide in 1932.
