= Jozef Langenus =

Belgian middle-distance runner

Personal information
- Full name: Jozef Leo Armand Langenus
- Nationality: Belgian
- Born: 23 December 1898
- Died: 29 May 1987 (aged 88)

Sport
- Sport: Middle-distance running
- Event: Steeplechase

Jozef Leo Armand Langenus (23 December 1898 – 29 May 1987) was a Belgian middle-distance runner. He competed in the men's 3000 metres steeplechase at the 1928 Summer Olympics held in Amsterdam, Netherlands.
