= Henri Dartigues =

French middle-distance runner

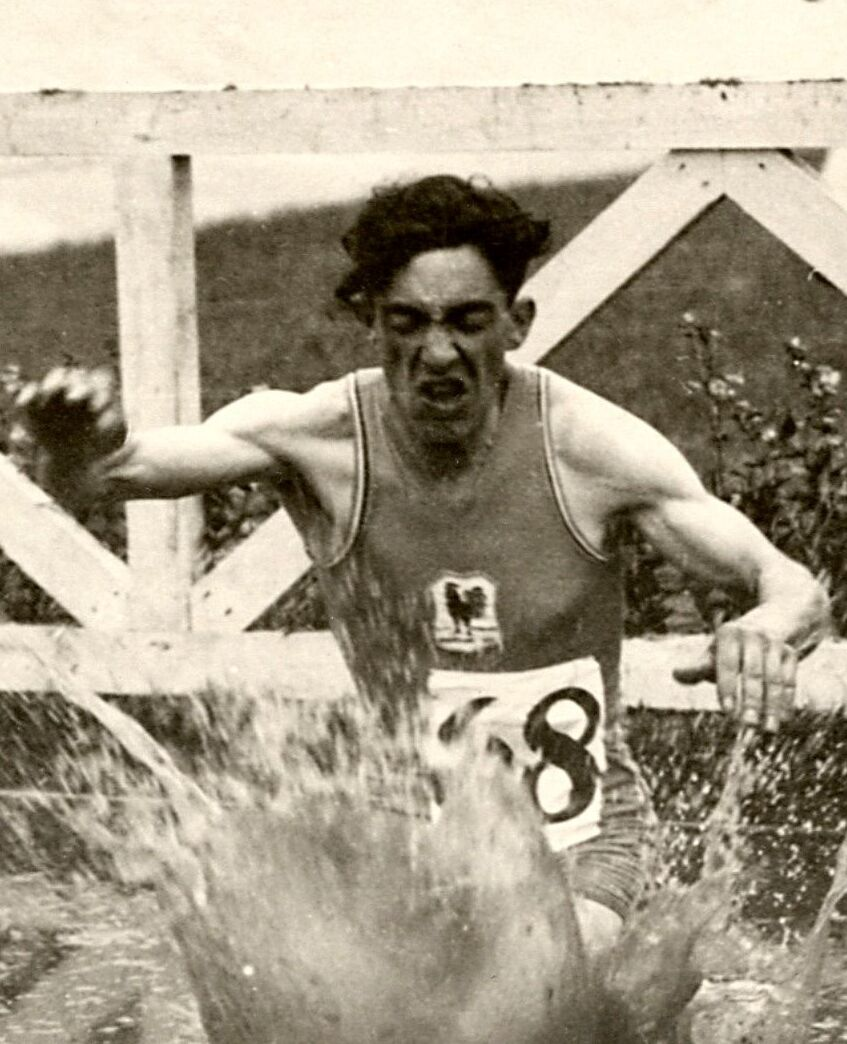

Personal information
- Nationality: French
- Born: 17 September 1902 Baigts-de-Béarn
- Died: 7 September 1967 (aged 64) La Garenne-Colombes

Sport
- Sport: Middle-distance running
- Event: Steeplechase

Henri Dartigues (17 September 1902 – 7 September 1967) was a French middle-distance runner. He competed in the men's 3000 metres steeplechase at the 1928 Summer Olympics.
