= Norman Biddulph =

British middle-distance runner (1904–1955)

Personal information
- Full name: Norman Stevenson Biddulph
- Nationality: British
- Born: 21 April 1904 Moston, Lancashire, England
- Died: 27 September 1955 (aged 51) Sheffield, Yorkshire, England

Sport
- Sport: Middle-distance running
- Event: Steeplechase

Norman Stevenson Biddulph (21 April 1904 – 27 September 1955) was a British middle-distance runner. He competed in the men's 3000 metres steeplechase at the 1928 Summer Olympics.

Biddulph was a three-time Northern Counties Athletic Association champion in the steeplechase from 1926 to 1928. Despite being a member of a Yorkshire club, he was able to compete at the AAA Championships via birth qualification. Biddulph's rival was Oxford's W. A. M. Edwards and he was compared by critics to his teammate E. Harper. His 1928 performance of 9:37.5 in the 3000 m steeplechase ranked him 8th in the world for that year.

He competed in cross country running for Hallamshire and gained favor with that club, inviting its members to tea after races and organizing charity events. His presence at meets created interest from fans but at times scrutiny from competitors. He later became landlord at the Royal Oak Hotel, Garstang.

Buddulph was also a member of the Yorkshire Dragoons. He is related to 1912 Olympian Joe Cottrill through marriage, as his wife Ivy Cottrill was Joe's niece.
