= Edith Mayne =

English swimmer

Personal information
- Born: September 29, 1905 Newton Abbot, England
- Died: May 7, 1953 (aged 47) Pretoria, South Africa

Sport
- Sport: Swimming

Edith May Mayne (29 September 1905 – 7 May 1953), later known by her married name Edith Peacock, was an English freestyle swimmer from Newton Abbot, Devon, who broke the world record in the women's 1500-metre freestyle on 15 September 1926 in Exmouth, Devon, clocking 24:00.2. She represented Great Britain in the 400-metre freestyle event at the 1928 Summer Olympics in Amsterdam, Netherlands, but was eliminated in the semi-finals.

== See also ==
- World record progression 1500 metres freestyle

Records
Preceded by Ethel McGary	Women's 1500 metres freestyle World Record Holder (Long Course); 15 September 1926 – 28 July 1927	Succeeded by Martha Norelius
