= Ryszard Błażyca =

Polish wrestler

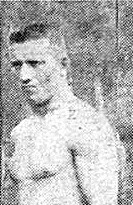
- Błażyca in 1928

Personal information
- Nationality: Polish
- Born: 1 April 1896 Ruda Śląska, Poland
- Died: 28 September 1981 (aged 85) Wirki, Poland

Sport
- Sport: Wrestling

Ryszard Błażyca (1 April 1896 – 28 September 1981) was a Polish wrestler. He competed in the men's Greco-Roman lightweight at the 1928 Summer Olympics.
