= Fred Weicker =

American discus thrower

Personal information
- Nationality: American
- Born: August 1, 1906
- Died: March 7, 1955 (aged 48)

Sport
- Sport: Athletics
- Event: Discus throw

Fred Weicker (August 1, 1906 – March 7, 1955) was an American athlete. He competed in the men's discus throw at the 1928 Summer Olympics.
