= Józef Baran-Bilewski =

Polish athlete (1899–1940)

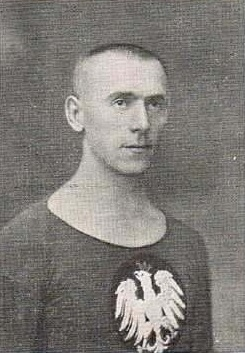

Personal information
- Nationality: Polish
- Born: 4 March 1899 Racławówka, Poland
- Died: April 1940 (aged 41) Katyn forest, Soviet Union

Sport
- Sport: Athletics
- Event: Discus throw

Józef Baran-Bilewski (4 March 1899 – 16 or 17 April 1940) was a Polish athlete. He competed in the men's discus throw at the 1928 Summer Olympics. He was killed during World War II.
