= Walter Gegan =

American middle-distance runner

Walter Thomas Gegan
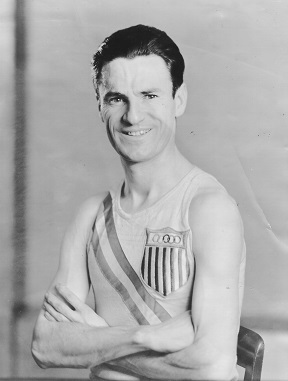
- Walter Thomas Gegan

Personal information
- Full name: Walter Thomas Gegan
- Nationality: American
- Born: December 1, 1899 Orange, New Jersey, U.S.
- Died: December 30, 1931 (aged 32) West Orange, New Jersey, U.S.
- Height: 5 ft 9 in (175 cm)
- Weight: 135 lb (61 kg)

Sport
- Sport: Middle-distance running
- Event: Steeplechase
- College team: Georgetown University
- Club: NYAC

Walter Thomas Gegan (December 1, 1899 – December 30, 1931) was an American middle-distance runner. He competed in the men's 3000 metres steeplechase at the 1928 Summer Olympics.

High schools attended include Seton Hall Prep 1916-1919 and St Benedicts Prep 1919-1920.

Colleges attended include Notre Dame University 1921 and Georgetown University 1922 - 1926.

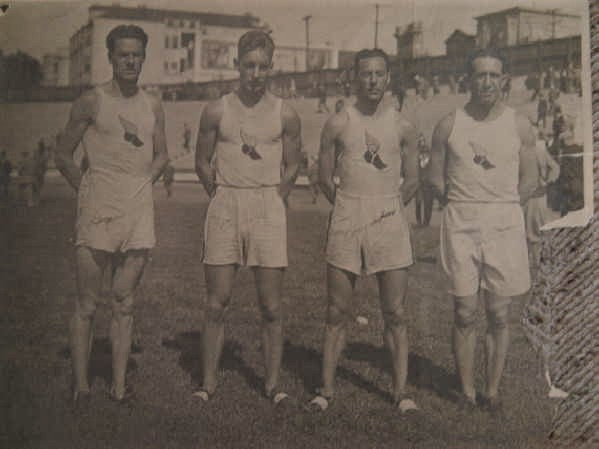
Walter T. Gegan, on left, at a collegiate track meet in Berkeley, California, in 1925.
