= Ernst Mumenthaler =

Swiss wrestler

Personal information
- Nationality: Swiss

Sport
- Sport: Wrestling

Ernst Mumenthaler was a Swiss wrestler. He competed in the men's Greco-Roman lightweight at the 1928 Summer Olympics.
