= Arturo Conturbia =

Swiss discus thrower

Personal information
- Nationality: Swiss
- Born: 4 February 1902
- Died: 13 April 1970 (aged 68)

Sport
- Sport: Athletics
- Event: Discus throw

Arturo Conturbia (4 February 1902 – 13 April 1970) was a Swiss athlete. He competed in the men's discus throw at the 1928 Summer Olympics.
