= Miroslav Metzner-Fritz =

Yugoslav wrestler (1904–1992)

Personal information
- Nationality: Yugoslav
- Born: 5 January 1904 Vienna, Austria-Hungary
- Died: 27 February 1992 (aged 88) Zagreb, Yugoslavia

Sport
- Sport: Wrestling

Miroslav Metzner-Fritz (5 January 1904 – 27 February 1992) was a Yugoslav wrestler. He competed in the men's Greco-Roman lightweight at the 1928 Summer Olympics.
