= Piero Postini =

Italian wrestler

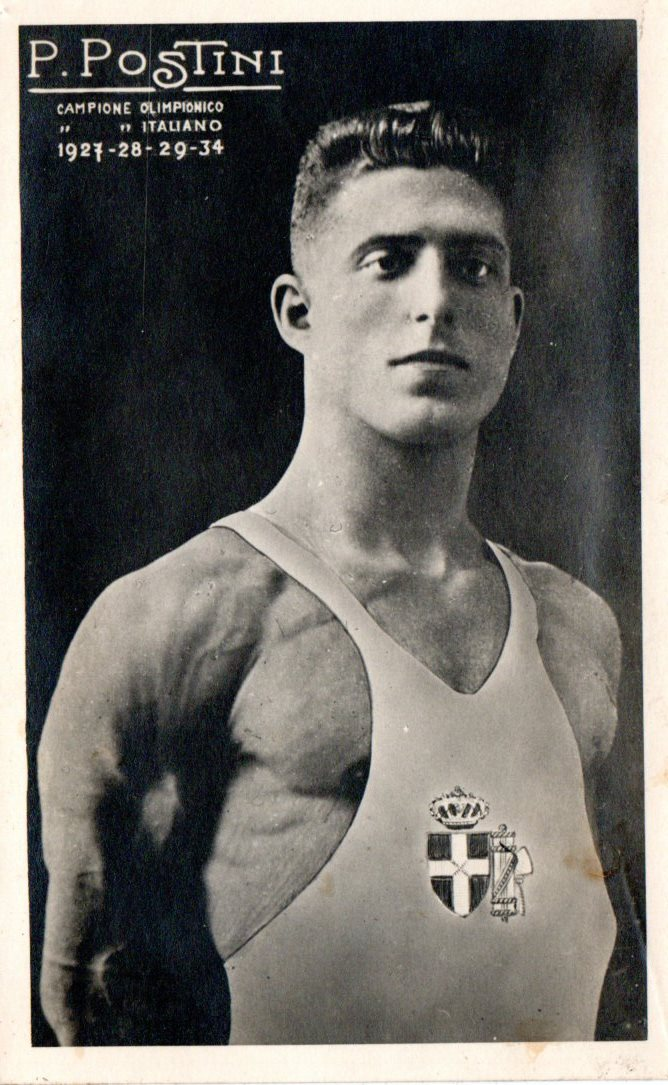

Personal information
- Nationality: Italian
- Born: 20 November 1904 Borgo San Giovanni, Italy
- Died: 28 January 1978 (aged 73) Milan, Italy

Sport
- Sport: Wrestling

Piero Postini (20 November 1904 – 28 January 1978) was an Italian wrestler. He competed in the men's Greco-Roman lightweight at the 1928 Summer Olympics.
