= Swimming at the 1928 Summer Olympics – Women's 400 metre freestyle =

Women's 400 metre freestyle at the Games of the IX Olympiad
- Venue: Olympic Sports Park Swim Stadium
- Date: 4 August 1928 (heats); 5 August 1928 (semifinals); 6 August 1928 (final)
- Competitors: 20 from 9 nations
- Winning time: 5:42.8 WR

Medalists
1st place, gold medalist(s)		Martha Norelius	United States
2nd place, silver medalist(s)		Marie Braun	Netherlands
3rd place, bronze medalist(s)		Josephine McKim	United States

The women's 400 metre freestyle was a swimming event held as part of the swimming at the 1928 Summer Olympics programme. It was the second appearance of the event, which was established in 1924 after 1920 a 300-metre event was held. The competition was held from Saturday to Monday, 4 to 6 August 1928.

Twenty swimmers from nine nations competed. The winning margin was an astonishing 15 seconds which as of 2023 is the only time this event has been won by more than 8 seconds at the Olympics.

== Records ==
These were the standing world and Olympic records (in minutes) prior to the 1928 Summer Olympics.

World record	5:49.6	(United States) Martha Norelius	New York City (USA)	30 June 1928
Olympic record	6:02.2	(United States) Martha Norelius	Paris (FRA)	15 July 1924

In the first heat Martha Norelius set a new world record with 5:45.4 minutes. In the final she bettered her own record to 5:42.8 minutes.

== Results ==
=== Heats ===
Saturday 4 August 1928: The fastest two in each heat and the fastest third-placed from across the heats advanced.

==== Heat 1 ====
Rank	Swimmer	Nation	Time	Notes
1	Martha Norelius	United States	5:45.4	Q, WR
2	Cissie Stewart	Great Britain	6:12.3	Q
3	Truus Baumeister	Netherlands	6:26.4	
4	Marguerite Ledoux	France	Unknown	
5	Mary Bedford	South Africa	Unknown	
6	Dora Schönemann	Germany	6:37.0	

==== Heat 2 ====
Rank	Swimmer	Nation	Time	Notes
1	Ethel McGary	United States	6:04.6	Q
2	Iris Tanner	Great Britain	6:11.0	Q
3	Edna Davey	Australia	6:12.0	
4	Charlotte Lehmann	Germany	6:28.0	
5	Rhoda Rennie	South Africa	Unknown	
6	Georgina Roty	France	Unknown	

==== Heat 3 ====
Rank	Swimmer	Nation	Time	Notes
1	Josephine McKim	United States	6:10.0	Q
2	Kathleen Miller	New Zealand	6:16.8	Q
3	Fritzi Löwy	Austria	6:20.0	
4	Disa Lindberg	Finland	Unknown	

==== Heat 4 ====
Rank	Swimmer	Nation	Time	Notes
1	Marie Braun	Netherlands	5:53.8	Q
2	Freddie van der Goes	South Africa	6:03.6	Q
3	Edith Mayne	Great Britain	6:10.4	q
4	Reni Erkens	Germany	Unknown	

=== Semifinals ===
Sunday 5 August 1928: The fastest three in each semi-final advanced to the final.

==== Semifinal 1 ====
Rank	Swimmer	Nation	Time	Notes
1	Martha Norelius	United States	5:58.0	Q
2	Freddie van der Goes	South Africa	6:01.6	Q
3	Cissie Stewart	Great Britain	6:06.4	Q
4	Ethel McGary	United States	Unknown	
5	Kathleen Miller	New Zealand	Unknown	

==== Semifinal 2 ====
Rank	Swimmer	Nation	Time	Notes
1	Marie Braun	Netherlands	5:54.6	Q
2	Josephine McKim	United States	5:55.0	Q
3	Iris Tanner	Great Britain	6:09.0	Q
4	Edith Mayne	Great Britain	Unknown	

=== Final ===
Monday 6 August 1928:

Rank	Swimmer	Nation	Time	Notes
1st place, gold medalist(s)	Martha Norelius	United States	5:42.8	WR
2nd place, silver medalist(s)	Marie Braun	Netherlands	5:57.8	
3rd place, bronze medalist(s)	Josephine McKim	United States	6:00.2	
4	Cissie Stewart	Great Britain	6:07.0	
5	Freddie van der Goes	South Africa	6:07.2	
6	Iris Tanner	Great Britain	6:11.6	
