= Freddie van der Goes =

South African swimmer (1908–1976)

Personal information
- Born: November 26, 1908 Pretoria, South Africa
- Died: October 24, 1976 (aged 67) Pretoria, South Africa

Sport
- Sport: Swimming
Medal record
Representing South Africa
Olympic Games
Bronze medal – third place	1928 Amsterdam	4×100 m freestyle

Frederika "Freddie" Jacoba van der Goes (26 November 1908 – 24 October 1976) was a South African freestyle swimmer who competed in the 1928 Summer Olympics.

She was born and died in Pretoria.

In 1928 she was a member of the South African relay team which won the bronze medal in the 4×100 m freestyle relay event

She also competed in the 400 metre freestyle competition and finished fifth.
