= Henry Oliver (athlete) =

British athlete (1902–1995)

Personal information
- Full name: Edward Henry Oliver
- Nationality: British
- Born: 9 July 1902 Maidenhead, England
- Died: 9 April 1995 (aged 92) Wokingham, England

Sport
- Sport: Middle-distance running
- Event: Steeplechase
- Club: Reading AC

Edward Henry Oliver (9 July 1902 – 9 April 1995) was a British middle-distance runner who competed at the 1928 Summer Olympics.

== Career ==
Oliver finished second behind Jack Webster in the steeplechase event at 1927 AAA Championships. He finished second again behind Jack Webster in the steeplechase event at the 1928 AAA Championships.

Shortly afterwards he represented Great Britain at the 1928 Olympic Games in Amsterdam, Netherlands, where he competed in the men's 3000 metres steeplechase.

Oliver finally became the national steeplechase champion after winning the AAA title at the 1929 AAA Championships.
