= Ketil Askildt =

Norwegian discus thrower and Olympian

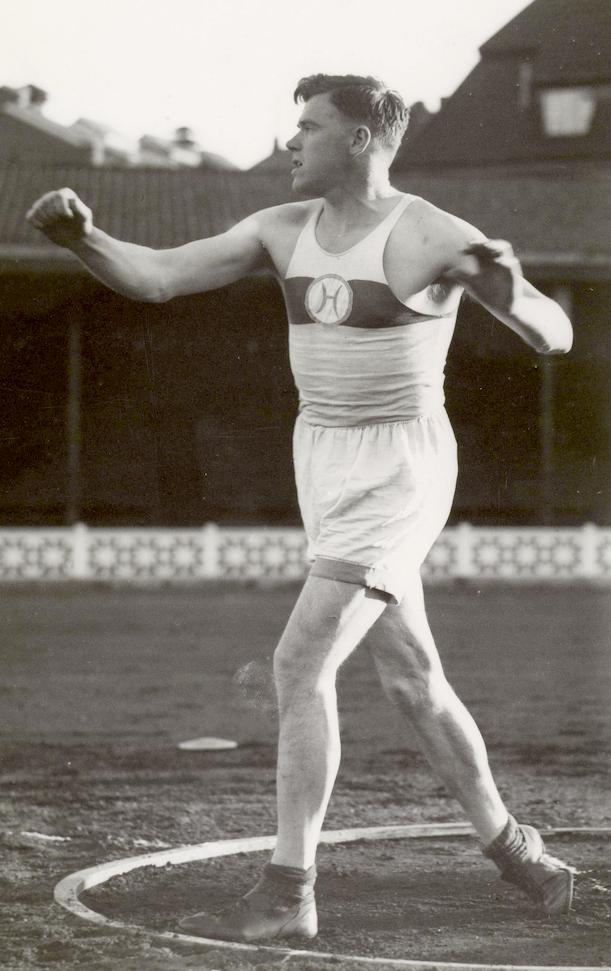
- Askildt at Bislett Stadion in 1933

Personal information
- Nationality: Norwegian
- Born: 24 November 1900 Skien, Vestfold og Telemark, Norway
- Died: 6 September 1978 (aged 77) Nes, Sauherad, Vestfold og Telemark, Norway
- Height: 188 cm (6 ft 2 in)
- Weight: 92 kg (203 lb)

Sport
- Sport: Athletics
- Event: discus
- Club: Idrettslaget Hermod

Kittil Halvorsen Askildt (24 November 1900 – 6 September 1978) was a Norwegian discus thrower who competed at the 1924 Summer Olympics.

== Career ==
At the 1924 Olympics Games, he finished fifth in the discus final with a throw of 43.40 metres. In addition he finished fifteenth in shot put. At the 1928 Summer Olympics he finished thirteenth in discus throw with 42.57 metres. He became Norwegian champion in discus throw in the years 1925-1927, 1929-1930 and 1931-1933.

His personal best throw was 46.48, achieved in August 1926 on Bislett Stadion.

Askildt finished second behind Patrick Bermingham in the discus throw event at the British 1926 AAA Championships and third behind Jules Noël in the discus throw event at the British 1930 AAA Championships.
