= Toimi Tulikoura =

Personal information
- Nationality: Finnish
- Born: 19 February 1905 Vehkalahti, Finland
- Died: 30 July 1983 (aged 78) Kuopio, Finland

Sport
- Sport: Athletics
- Events: Long jump Triple jump

Toimi Tulikoura (19 February 1905 – 30 July 1983) was a Finnish athlete. He competed in the men's long jump and the men's triple jump at the 1928 Summer Olympics.
