= Armas Valste =

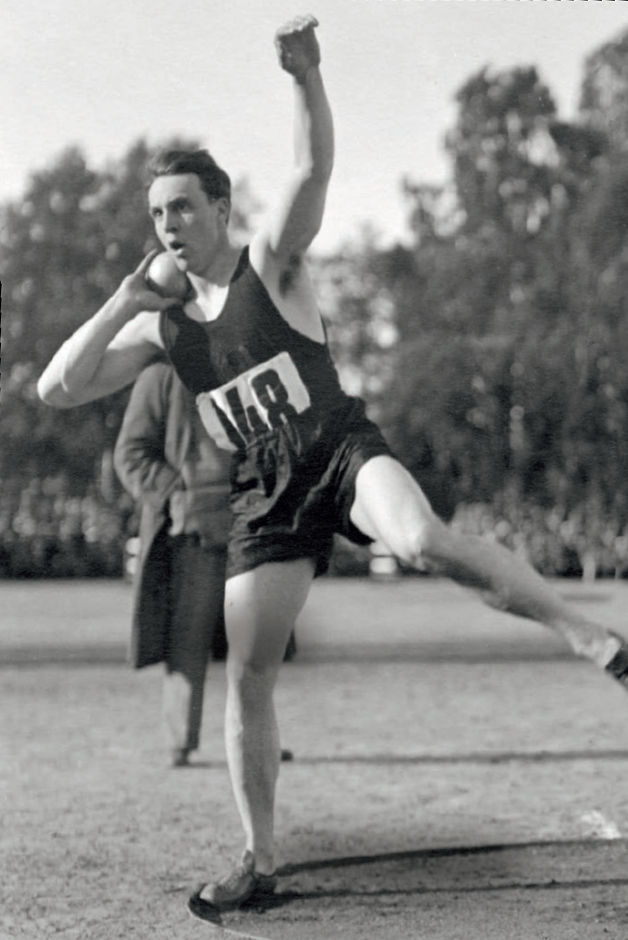
- Armas Valste at the 1928 Olympics

Personal information
- Born: 7 August 1905 Turku, Finland
- Died: 16 March 1991 (aged 85) Portimão, Portugal
- Height: 1.78 m (5 ft 10 in)
- Weight: 80 kg (180 lb)

Sport
- Sport: Athletics
- Club: Viipurin Urheilijat, Helsinki

Achievements and titles
- Olympic finals: 1928

Armas Ilmari Valste (born Wahlstedt; 7 August 1905 – 16 March 1991) was a Finnish athlete and a prominent coach and sports administrator. He competed at the 1928 Olympics in the high jump, shot put and decathlon with the best achievement of fifth place in the shot put. From 1935 to 1960 he was the head coach of the national athletics team and from 1970 to 1980 a board member of the European Athletics Association. He was the Secretary General of the 1971 European Athletics Championships held in Helsinki, Finland.

== Biography ==
Valste won his first athletics competitions in 1922 and later set two national records in the high jump (188.5 and 190 cm) and one in the shot put (15.66 m). From 1925 to 1932 he won ten national titles in these two events.

Valste retired from competitions in early 1930s. From 1930 to 1935 he was a coach and from 1935 to 1960 the head coach of the Finnish athletics team, preparing it to the 1936, 1948, 1952, 1956 and 1960 Olympics, as well as other international competitions in between. He then moved to administrative positions and was the Secretary General of the 1971 European Athletics Championships held in Helsinki. He retired the same year for health reasons, but remained active in sports and from 1970 to 1980 was a board member of the European Athletics Association. In recognition to his contribution to athletics he was awarded the Order of the White Rose of Finland in 1964 and the IAAF Veteran Pin in 1976. He remains an honorary member of EAA. The sports club Armas Valste Yleisurheiluklubi was established in his honor after his death.

Valste was a radio engineer by profession and an amateur radio station operator. From 1927 to 1929 he worked as a professional broadcaster. In 1960 he became an honorary member and in 1985 the honorary chairman of the Finnish Amateur Radio League.

== Bibliography ==
- Martiskainen, Seppo (2006) Nuorten yleisurheilu, Nuorten kilpailutoiminta, Suomi voittoon – kansa liikkumaan, Helsinki: SUL Julkaisut Oy/Yleisurheilun Tukisäätiö, ISBN 951-98952-2-1.
