= Heikki Taskinen (athlete) =

Finnish discus thrower

Personal information
- Nationality: Finnish
- Born: 28 July 1905 Nilsiä, Finland
- Died: 15 May 1988 (aged 82) Kuopio, Finland

Sport
- Sport: Athletics
- Event: Discus throw

Heikki Taskinen (28 July 1905 – 15 May 1988) was a Finnish athlete. He competed in the men's discus throw at the 1928 Summer Olympics.
