= Alberto Barbieri (wrestler) =

Argentine wrestler

Personal information
- Nationality: Argentine
- Born: 1903

Sport
- Sport: Wrestling

Alberto Barbieri (born 1903, date of death unknown) was an Argentine wrestler. He competed in the men's Greco-Roman lightweight at the 1928 Summer Olympics.
