= Toivo Loukola =

Finnish runner (1902–1984)

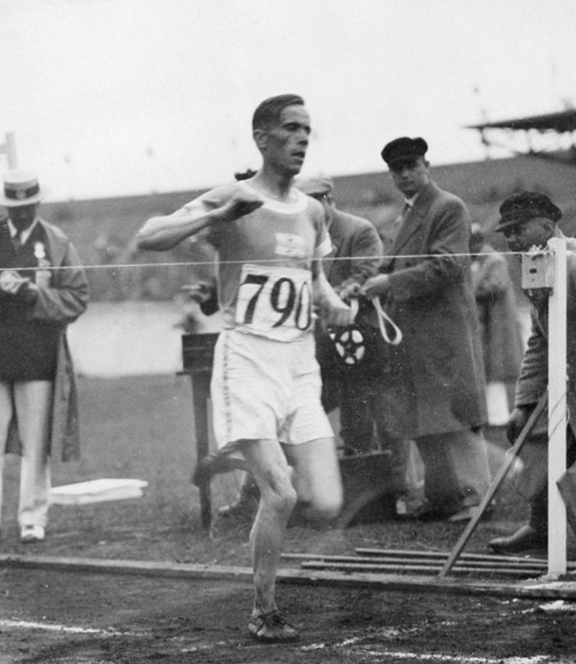
- Loukola winning the steeplechase at the 1928 Olympics

Personal information
- Born: 2 October 1902 Kortesjärvi, Grand Duchy of Finland, Russian Empire
- Died: 10 January 1984 (aged 81) Helsinki, Finland
- Height: 173 cm (5 ft 8 in)
- Weight: 60 kg (132 lb)

Sport
- Sport: Athletics
- Events: 1500–10,000 m, steeplechase
- Club: HT, Helsinki

Achievements and titles
- Personal bests: 1500 m – 3:58.4 (1931); 5000 m – 14:48.2 (1930 ) 10,000 m – 31:12.9 (1929); 3000 mS – 9:21.8 (1928)
Medal record
Representing Finland
Olympic Games
Gold medal – first place	1928 Amsterdam	3000 m steeplechase

Toivo Aarne Loukola (2 October 1902 – 10 January 1984) was a Finnish male runner, winner of the 3000 metres steeplechase at the 1928 Amsterdam Olympics. Loukola set an unofficial world record in the steeplechase just a month before the Olympics.

In Amsterdam, Loukola first finished seventh in the 10,000 m race and then easily won his 3000 m steeplechase heat. In the final the main favourites were the Finns Paavo Nurmi, Ville Ritola and Loukola, but Nurmi and Ritola were worn by their injuries and the gruelling 5000 m race of the previous day. Although Ritola gave up soon, the Finns were still going to the first three places. After 2000 m, when Nurmi had trouble at hurdles, Loukola made an attack and developed a 30 m gap, which he would hold until the finish. Loukola won in a new world record of 9.21.8, finishing almost 10 seconds ahead of second-placed Nurmi.

Loukola also won 11 national titles, in the 5,000 m (1928–29), 10,000 m (1928–29, 1932 and 1936) and steeplechase (1928–32). He was a policeman by profession.
