= Urho Korhonen =

Finnish gymnast (1907–1971)

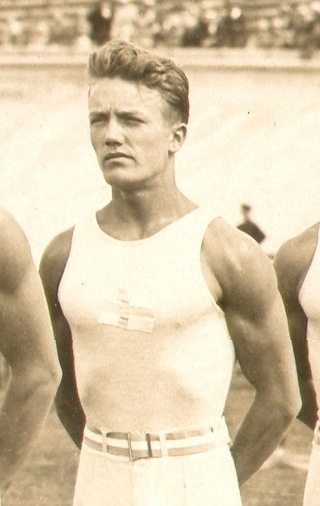
- Korhonen in 1928

Personal information
- Full name: Urho Kultimo Aapelinpoika Korhonen
- Born: 14 June 1907 Viipuri, Grand Duchy of Finland, Russian Empire
- Died: 23 May 1971 (aged 63) Helsinki, Finland
- Relatives: Riku Korhonen (father)

Gymnastics career
- Discipline: Men's artistic gymnastics
- Country represented: Finland

Urho Kultimo Aapelinpoika Korhonen (14 June 1907 – 23 May 1971) was a Finnish gymnast. He competed in seven events at the 1928 Summer Olympics.

Korhonen was the son of Riku Korhonen.
