= Gerrit Eijsker =

Dutch discus thrower

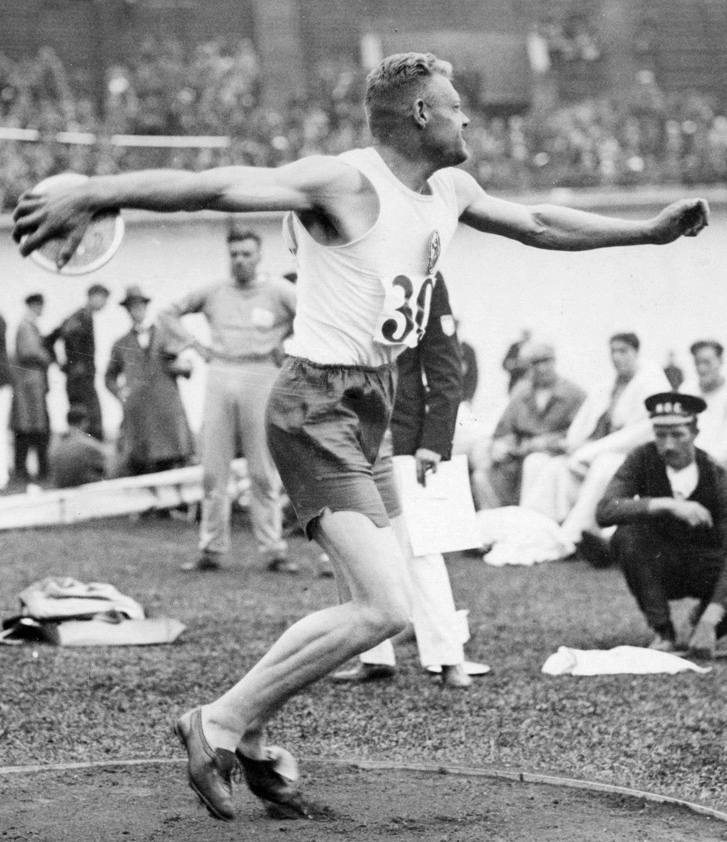
- Eijsker at the 1928 Olympics

Personal information
- Born: July 19, 1901 Wormerveer, Netherlands
- Died: October 31, 1969 (aged 68) Amsterdam, Netherlands

Sport
- Country: Netherlands
- Sport: Athletics
- Event: Discus throw
- Club: AV Haarlem

Achievements and titles
- Personal best: DT – 42.77 m (1932)

Gerrit Eijsker also written as Gerrit Eysker (19 July 1901 – 31 October 1969) was a Dutch discus thrower. He competed at the 1928 Summer Olympics and placed 24th.
