= Eino Kenttä =

Finnish discus thrower

Personal information
- Full name: Eino Johannes Evert Kenttä
- Nationality: Finnish
- Born: 3 November 1906 Tampere, Grand Duchy of Finland, Russian Empire
- Died: 16 November 1952 (aged 46) Tampere, Finland

Sport
- Sport: Athletics
- Event: Discus throw

Eino Kenttä (3 November 1906 – 16 November 1952) was a Finnish athlete. He competed in the men's discus throw at the 1928 Summer Olympics.
