= Disa Lindberg =

Finnish swimmer

Personal information
- Born: 15 March 1910 Kuopio, Grand Duchy of Finland, Russian Empire
- Died: 2 September 1974 (aged 64) Kuopio, Finland

Sport
- Sport: Swimming

Disa Lindberg (15 March 1910 – 2 September 1974) was a Finnish swimmer. She competed in the women's 400 metre freestyle event at the 1928 Summer Olympics.
