= Karl Pedersen (wrestler) =

Norwegian wrestler

Personal information
- Nationality: Norwegian
- Born: 23 January 1902 Oslo, Norway
- Died: 7 October 1988 (aged 86) Oslo, Norway

Sport
- Sport: Wrestling

Karl Pedersen (23 January 1902 – 7 October 1988) was a Norwegian wrestler. He competed in the men's Greco-Roman lightweight at the 1928 Summer Olympics.
