= Vasilios Pavlidis (wrestler) =

Greek wrestler

- Born: 1897; Athens, Greece

Vasilios Pavlidis (born 1897, date of death unknown) was a Greek wrestler. He competed at the 1920, 1924 and 1928 Summer Olympics.
