= Hermann Hänchen =

German discus thrower

Personal information
- Full name: Hermann Gotthelf Hänchen
- Nationality: German
- Born: 26 January 1898 Zeipau, German Empire

Sport
- Sport: Athletics
- Event: Discus throw

Hermann Gotthelf Hänchen (born 26 January 1898) was a German athlete. He competed in the men's discus throw at the 1928 Summer Olympics.
