= Antero Kivi =

Finnish discus thrower (1904–1981)

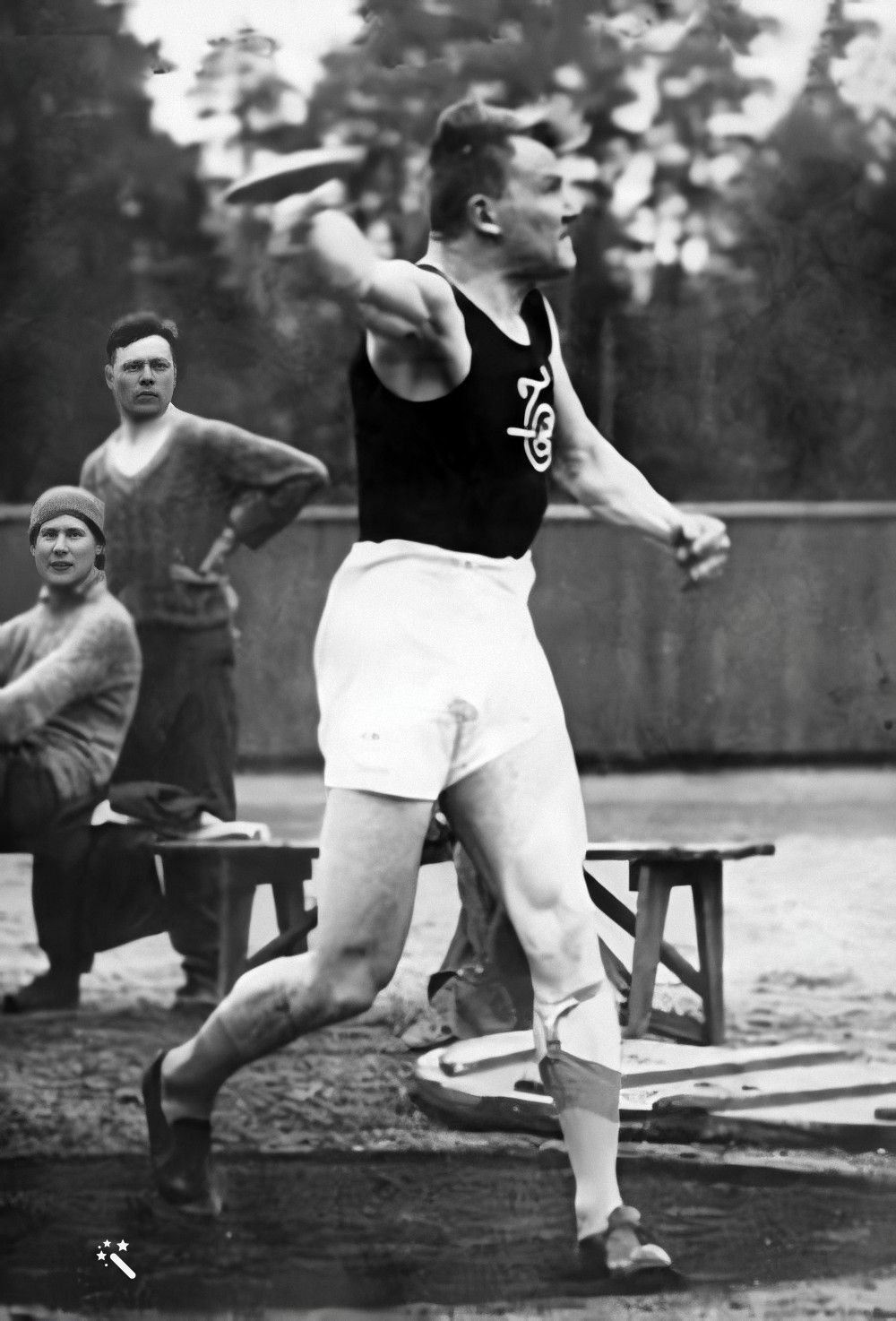
- Antero Kivi in 1928

Personal information
- Born: 15 April 1904 Orivesi, Grand Duchy of Finland, Russian Empire
- Died: 29 June 1981 (aged 77) Helsinki, Finland

Sport
- Sport: Athletics
- Event: Discus throw
- Club: Oriveden Ponnistus

Achievements and titles
- Personal best: 48.46 (1931)
Medal record
Representing Finland
Olympic Games
Silver medal – second place	1928 Amsterdam	Discus throw

Lauri Antero Kivi (15 April 1904 – 29 June 1981) was a Finnish discus thrower who won the silver medal at the 1928 Summer Olympics.
