= Adolphe Dumont =

Luxembourgish wrestler

- Born: 1899

Adolphe Dumont (born 1899, date of death unknown) was a Luxembourgish wrestler. He competed at the 1924 and the 1928 Summer Olympics.
