= Edgard Viseur =

Belgian middle-distance runner

Personal information
- Nationality: Belgian
- Born: 4 October 1905

Sport
- Sport: Middle-distance running
- Event: Steeplechase

Edgard Viseur (born 4 October 1905, date of death unknown) was a Belgian middle-distance runner. He competed in the men's 3000 metres steeplechase at the 1928 Summer Olympics.
