= Henrique Santos (runner) =

Portuguese middle-distance runner

Personal information
- Nationality: Portuguese
- Born: 21 March 1908
- Died: 23 July 1981 (aged 73)

Sport
- Sport: Middle-distance running
- Event: Steeplechase

Henrique Santos (21 March 1908 – 23 July 1981) was a Portuguese middle-distance runner. He competed in the men's 3000 metres steeplechase at the 1928 Summer Olympics.
