= William Spencer (athlete) =

American middle-distance runner

Personal information
- Born: July 30, 1900 Jackson, Tennessee, United States
- Died: July 14, 1983 (aged 82) Starkville, Mississippi, United States

Sport
- Sport: Middle-distance running
- Event: 1500 metres

William Spencer (July 30, 1900 – July 14, 1983) was an American middle-distance runner. He competed in the men's 1500 metres at the 1924 Summer Olympics.
