= Tauno Lampola =

Finnish modern pentathlete

Personal information
- Born: 8 December 1903 Kokkola, Finland
- Died: 12 April 1969 (aged 65) Hämeenlinna, Finland

Sport
- Sport: Modern pentathlon

Tauno Lampola (8 December 1903 – 12 April 1969) was a Finnish modern pentathlete. He competed at the 1928 Summer Olympics.
