= Ove Andersen (athlete) =

Finnish long-distance runner

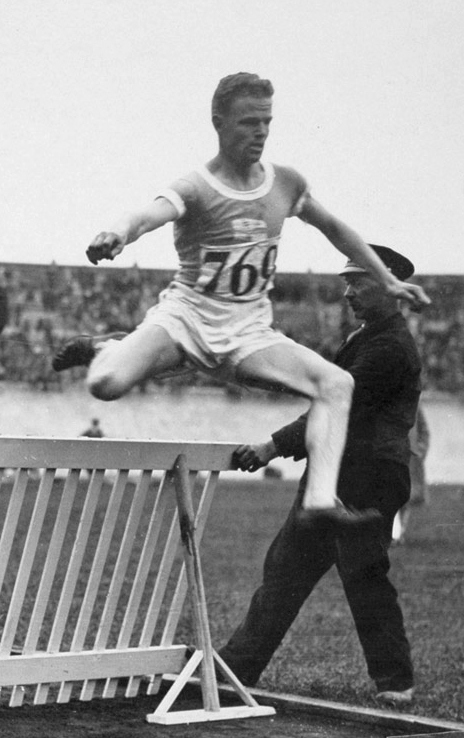
- Andersen at the 1928 Olympics

Personal information
- Born: 22 August 1899 Kymi, Grand Duchy of Finland, Russian Empire
- Died: 13 January 1967 (aged 67) Lahti, Finland
- Height: 178 cm (5 ft 10 in)
- Weight: 69–71 kg (152–157 lb)

Sport
- Sport: Athletics
- Event(s): 5000 m, 10,000 m, steeplechase
- Club: Lahden Urheilijat, Lahti

Achievements and titles
- Personal best(s): 5000 m – 15:08.8 (1925); 10,000 m – 31:54.3 (1928); 3000 mS – 9:35.6e (1928)
Medal record
Representing Finland
Olympic Games
Bronze medal – third place	1928 Amsterdam	3000 m steeplechase

Ove Andersen (22 August 1899 – 13 January 1967) was a Finnish long-distance runner, who won a bronze medal in the 3000 m steeplechase at the 1928 Summer Olympics.
