= Walter Massop =

Dutch wrestler

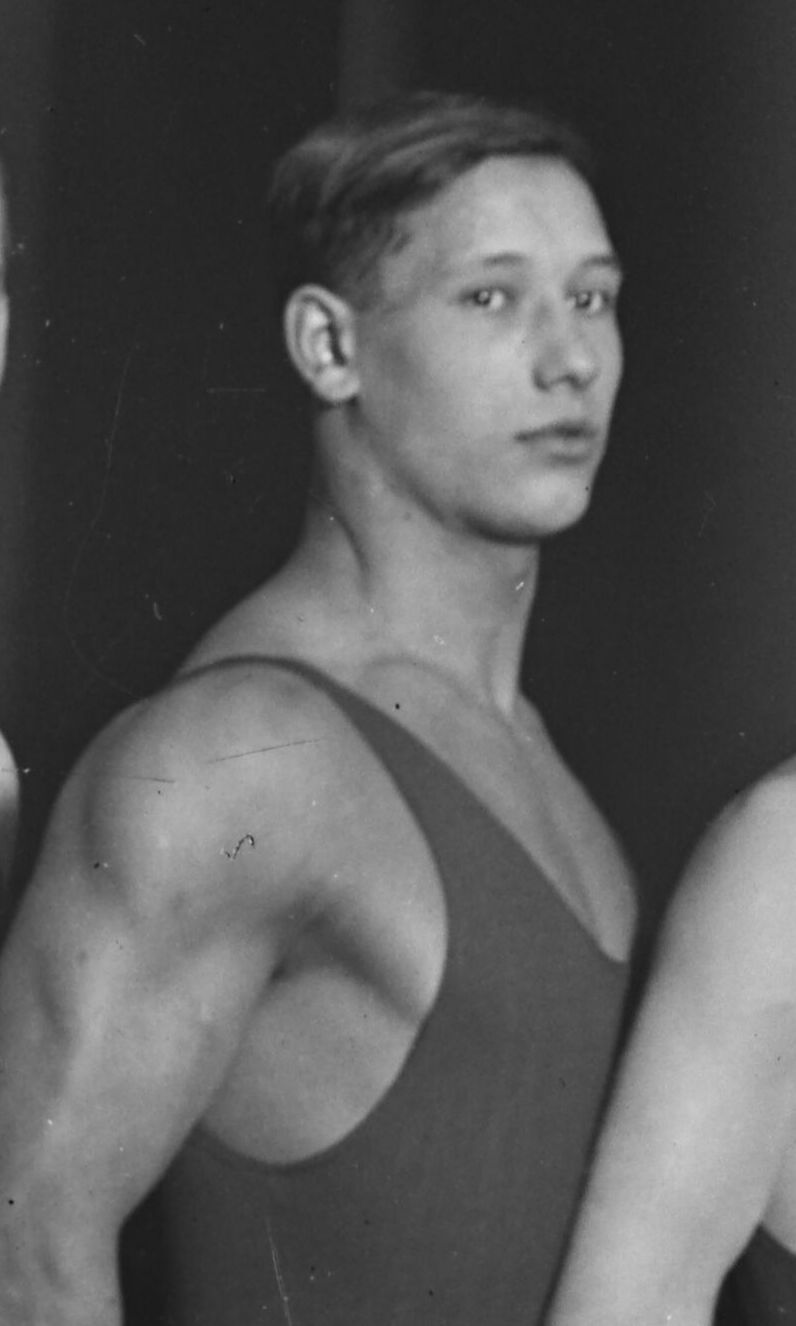
- Walter Massop in 1927

Personal information
- Nationality: Dutch
- Born: 10 October 1907 Hamburg, Germany
- Died: 10 September 1979 (aged 71) Amsterdam, Netherlands

Sport
- Sport: Wrestling

Walter Massop (10 October 1907 – 10 September 1979) was a Dutch wrestler. He competed in the men's Greco-Roman lightweight at the 1928 Summer Olympics.
