= Eduard Sperling =

German wrestler (1902–1985)

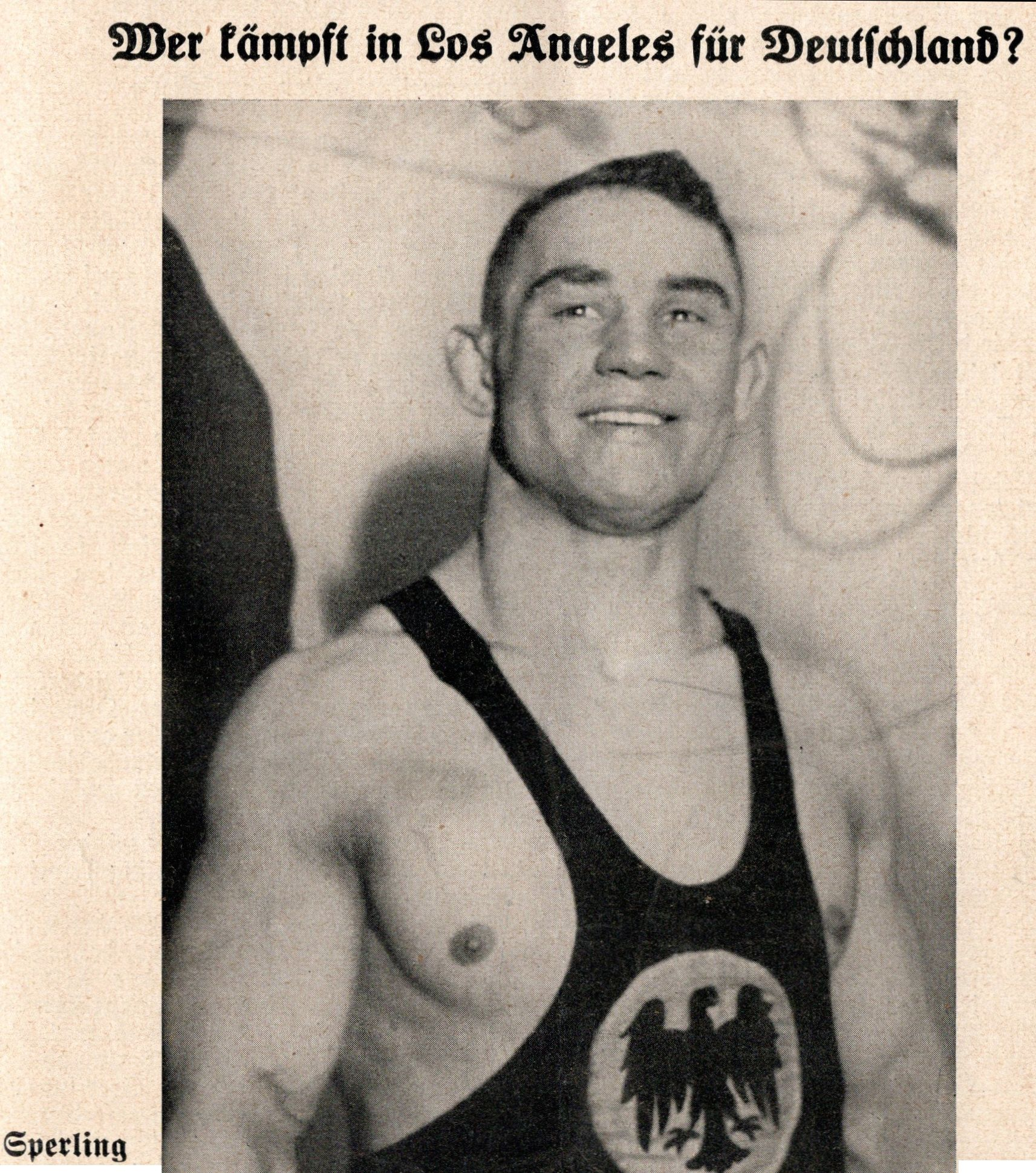

Personal information
- Born: November 29, 1902 Hamm, German Empire
- Died: February 24, 1985 (aged 82) Dortmund, West Germany
Medal record
Men's Greco-Roman wrestling
Representing Germany
Olympic Games
Silver medal – second place	1928 Amsterdam	Lightweight
Bronze medal – third place	1932 Los Angeles	Lightweight

Eduard Sperling (29 November 1902 – 24 February 1985) was a German wrestler who competed in the 1928 Summer Olympics and in the 1932 Summer Olympics.
