= Aukusti Sihvola =

Finnish wrestler (1895–1947)

Medal record

Men's freestyle wrestling

Representing Finland

Olympic Games
Silver medal – second place	1928 Amsterdam	Heavyweight

Aukusti Sihvola (7 March 1895 – 18 June 1947) was a Finnish wrestler and Olympic medalist. He was born in Sippola.

He received a silver medal in freestyle wrestling at the 1928 Summer Olympics in Amsterdam.

Sihvola died in Luumäki.
