= Belgium at the 1928 Summer Olympics =

- IOC code: BEL
- NOC: Belgian Olympic Committee

in Amsterdam
- Competitors: 187 (176 men, 11 women) in 15 sports
- Medals Ranked 29th: Gold 0 Silver 1 Bronze 2 Total 3

Summer Olympics appearances (overview)
- 1900; 1904; 1908; 1912; 1920; 1924; 1928; 1932; 1936; 1948; 1952; 1956; 1960; 1964; 1968; 1972; 1976; 1980; 1984; 1988; 1992; 1996; 2000; 2004; 2008; 2012; 2016; 2020; 2024; 2028

Other related appearances
- 1906 Intercalated Games

Belgium competed at the 1928 Summer Olympics in Amsterdam, Netherlands. 187 competitors, 176 men and 11 women, took part in 90 events in 15 sports.

== Medalists ==
Medal	Name	Sport	Event	Date
Silver	Clement Spapen	Wrestling	Men's freestyle bantamweight	1 August
Bronze	Léonard Steyaert	Boxing	Men's middleweight	11 August
Bronze	Georges Anthony, François de Coninck, Léon Flament	Rowing	Men's coxed pair	10 August

== Athletics ==
32 athletes, 24 men and 8 women, represented Belgium in 1928. It was the nation's 5th appearance in the sport. It was the first time women's events were held in the sport.

Men

Track & road events

Athlete	Event	Heat		Quarterfinal		Semifinal		Final	
Athlete	Event	Result	Rank	Result	Rank	Result	Rank	Result	Rank
Paul Brochart	100 m	Unknown	2 Q	Unknown	5	Did not advance			
Willy Dujardin	100 m	11.2	3	Did not advance					
Adolphe Groscol	100 m	Unknown	4	Did not advance					
Fred Zinner	100 m	Unknown	3	Did not advance					
Paul Brochart	200 m	Unknown	2 Q	Unknown	3	Did not advance			
Willy Dujardin	200 m	Unknown	3	Did not advance					
Adolphe Groscol	200 m	23.8	4	Did not advance					
François Prinsen	200 m	Unknown	3	Did not advance					
Émile Langenraedt	400 m	Unknown	3	Did not advance					
François Prinsen	400 m	Unknown	2 Q	Unknown	4	Did not advance			
Gérald Bertheloot	800 m	—N/a		Unknown	5	Did not advance			
Philippe Coenjaerts	800 m	—N/a		Unknown	5	Did not advance			
Julien Serwy	5000 m	—N/a				DNF	–	Did not advance	
Julien Serwy	10,000 m	—N/a						Unknown	18
René Joannes-Powell	110 m hurdles	—N/a		Unknown	4	Did not advance			
Armand Lepaffe	110 m hurdles	—N/a		Unknown	3	Did not advance			
Marcel Swinnen	400 m hurdles	—N/a		Unknown	3	Did not advance			
Jozef Langenus	3000 m steeplechase	—N/a				Unknown	7	Did not advance	
Edgard Viseur	3000 m steeplechase	—N/a				Unknown	5	Did not advance	
Paul Brochart; Fred Zinner; Adolphe Groscol; Willy Dujardin	4×100 m relay	—N/a				Unknown	3	Did not advance	
Philippe Coenjaerts; Émile Vercken; François Prinsen; Émile Langenraedt	4×400 m relay	—N/a				Unknown	5	Did not advance	
Léon Broers	Marathon	—N/a						2:44:37	18
Jean Linssen	Marathon	—N/a						2:58:08	42
Jean Marien	Marathon	—N/a						3:16:13	56
Gerard Steuers	Marathon	—N/a						2:54:48	37

Field events

Athlete	Event	Qualification		Final	
Athlete	Event	Distance	Position	Distance	Position
Maurice Henrijean	Pole vault	3.50	10	Did not advance	
René Joannes-Powell	Pole vault	No height	–	Did not advance	
Gérard Noël	Pole vault	3.30	14	Did not advance	
Auguste Vos	Shot put	12.52	20	Did not advance	
Fred Zinner	Discus throw	34.35	32	Did not advance	
Gaston Étienne	Javelin throw	54.34	22	Did not advance	
Jules Herremans	Javelin throw	56.33	18	Did not advance	

Combined events – Decathlon

Athlete	Event	100 m	LJ	SP	HJ	400 m	110H	DT	PV	JT	1500 m	Final	Rank
Gaston Étienne	Result	13.0	5.51	9.65	1.50	1:00.2	20.8	29.81	3.20	54.85	4:51.4	4577	23
Gaston Étienne	Points	428	483	465	389	402	272	461	406	661	610	4577	23
René Joannes-Powell	Result	12.2	6.03	9.83	1.50	55.8	16.8	26.73	3.10	32.56	5:18.6	4780	25
René Joannes-Powell	Points	567	593	475	389	562	620	401	381	335	457	4780	25
Gérard Noël	Result	12.4	5.70	9.95	1.70	58.0	19.4	30.50	3.00	32.64	DNF	4106	27
Gérard Noël	Points	531	523	483	544	479	378	474	357	337	0	4106	27

Women

Track & road events

Athlete	Event	Quarterfinal		Semifinal		Final	
Athlete	Event	Result	Rank	Result	Rank	Result	Rank
Sidonie Verschueren	100 m	Unknown	4	Did not advance			
Ida Degrande	800 m	—N/a		Unknown	5	Did not advance	
Juliette Segers	800 m	—N/a		Unknown	6	Did not advance	
Elise Van Truyen; Rose Van Crombrugge; Juliette Segers; Léontine Stevens	4×100 m relay	—N/a		Unknown	4	Did not advance	

Field events

Athlete	Event	Qualification		Final	
Athlete	Event	Distance	Position	Distance	Position
Léontine Stevens	High jump	1.40	1 Q	1.48	5
Elise Van Truyen	High jump	1.40	1 Q	1.40	14
Sidonie Verschueren	High jump	1.40	1 Q	1.40	14
Lucie Petit-Diagre	Discus throw	25.28	20	Did not advance	
Jenny Toitgans	Discus throw	24.40	21	Did not advance	

== Boxing ==
Six men represented Belgium in boxing in 1928. It was the nation's third appearance in the sport. Both men reached the round of 16 (Sartos by winning his first bout, Anneet with a bye), but were defeated there.

Athlete	Event	Round of 32	Round of 16	Quarterfinals	Semifinals	Final / Bronze match	
Athlete	Event	Opposition Result	Opposition Result	Opposition Result	Opposition Result	Opposition Result	Rank
Robert Sartos	Men's flyweight	Hyman Miller (USA); W points	Carlo Covagnioli (ITA); L points	Did not advance			9
Raymond Van Rumbeke	Men's bantamweight	Bye	Carmelo Robledo (ARG); L points	Did not advance			9
Lucian Biquet	Men's featherweight	Bye	Elimar Kloos (GER); W points	Jan Górny (POL); W points	Víctor Peralta (ARG); L points	Harold Devine (USA); L points	4
Pierre Godart	Men's lightweight	Gunnar Berggren (SWE); L points	Did not advance				17
Adrien Anneet	Men's welterweight	Bye	Cor Blommers (NED); L points	Did not advance			9
Léonard Steyaert	Men's middleweight	Bye	Albert Leidmann (GER); W points	Jack Chase (IRL); W points	Piero Toscani (ITA); L points	Fred Mallin (GBR); W points	3rd place, bronze medalist(s)

== Cycling ==
Eight cyclists, all men, represented Belgium in 1928. It was the nation's 6th appearance in the sport, in which Belgium had competed every time that Belgium had sent an Olympic team. For the first time since 1912, Belgium won no cycling medals.

=== Road ===
Cyclist	Event	Time	Rank
Jean Aerts	Men's road race	5:10:38	11
Jean Chaerels	Men's road race	5:16:05	24
Pierre Houdé	Men's road race	5:11:18	12
Jef Lowagie	Men's road race	5:11:54	13
Jean Aerts; Pierre Houdé; Jef Lowagie	Men's team road race	15:33:50	5

=== Track ===
Time trial

Cyclist	Event	Time	Rank
Jean Aerts	Men's time trial	1:18.6	9

Match races

Cyclist	Event	1st Round	Repechage 1	Repechage Final	Quarterfinals	Semifinals	Final
Cyclist	Event	Rank	Rank	Rank	Rank	Rank	Rank
Yves Van Massenhove	Men's sprint	1 Q	Bye		2	Did not advance	
August Meuleman; Albert Muylle; Jean Van Buggenhout; Yves Van Massenhove	Men's team pursuit	1 Q	—N/a		2	Did not advance	

== Equestrian ==
Nine riders, all men, represented Belgium in the equestrian events in 1928. It was Belgium's 5th appearance in the sport; Belgium was one of 3 nations (along with France and the United States) to compete in every Olympic equestrian competition to date. For the second time in a row, Belgium won no medals.

Dressage

Athlete	Horse	Event	Score	Rank
Roger Delrue	Dreypuss	Dressage	146.14	29
Henri Laame	Belga	Dressage	167.70	27
Oswald Lints	Rira-t-elle	Dressage	185.86	24
Roger Delrue; Henri Laame; Oswald Lints	Dreypuss; Belga; Rira-t-elle	Team dressage	449.70	8

Eventing

Athlete	Horse	Event	Score	Rank
Louis-Marie de Jonghe d'Ardoye	Gigolo	Eventing	DNF	–
Louis Rousseaux	Swang	Eventing	1872.02	11
Georges Van der Ton	Remember Erin	Eventing	DNF	–
Louis-Marie de Jonghe d'Ardoye; Louis Rousseaux; Georges Van der Ton	Gigolo; Swang; Remember Erin	Team eventing	1872.02	10

Jumping

Athlete	Horse	Event	Final			1st re-ride		2nd re-ride	
Athlete	Horse	Event	Time	Penalties	Rank	Penalties	Rank	Penalties	Rank
Baudoin De Brabandère	Miss América	Individual	2:29	34 1/4	44	Did not advance			
Gaston Mesmaekers	As de Pique	Individual	1:37	14	35	Did not advance			
Jacques Misonne	Keepsake	Individual	2:04	16	38	Did not advance			
Baudoin De Brabandère; Gaston Mesmaekers; Jacques Misonne	Miss América; As de Pique; Keepsake	Team	–	64 1/4	14	—N/a			

== Fencing ==
21 fencers, 18 men and 3 women, represented Belgium in 1928. It was the nation's 6th appearance in the sport. Women fencers represented Belgium for the first time; Belgium had not had any entrants in the inaugural women's fencing competition in 1924. Belgium had three 4th-place finishes and four other final pool competitors, but won no medals. It was the first time since 1900 (Belgium's first appearance) that the nation failed to medal in the sport.

Fencer	Event	Round 1		Quarterfinals		Semifinals		Final	
Fencer	Event	Result	Rank	Result	Rank	Result	Rank	Result	Rank
Charles Debeur	Men's épée	5 wins	6 Q	5 wins	6 Q	4 wins	4 Q	3 wins	7
Charles Delporte	Men's épée	6 wins	3 Q	7 wins	5 Q	5 wins	3 Q	4 wins	6
Léon Tom	Men's épée	6 wins	1 Q	7 wins	2 Q	5 wins	2 Q	6 wins	4
Raymond Bru	Men's foil	—N/a		4 wins	3 Q	5 wins	3 Q	7 wins	6
Albert De Roocker	Men's foil	—N/a		4 wins	1 Q	DNF	–	Did not advance	
Pierre Pêcher	Men's foil	—N/a		5 wins	3 Q	2 wins	7	Did not advance	
Edith Addams	Women's foil	—N/a		3 wins	5	Did not advance			
Jenny Addams	Women's foil	—N/a		4 wins	3 Q	4 wins	4 Q	2 wins	6
Hilda Deswarte	Women's foil	—N/a		2 wins	5	Did not advance			
Henri Brasseur	Men's sabre	—N/a		2 wins	2 Q	0 wins	8	Did not advance	
Jacques Kesteloot	Men's sabre	—N/a		2 wins	3 Q	2 wins	8	Did not advance	
Édouard Yves	Men's sabre	—N/a		2 wins	4	Did not advance			
Émile Barbier; Georges Dambois; Balthazar De Beukelaer; Charles Debeur; Charles Delporte; Léon Tom	Men's team épée	1–0	1 Q	2–0	1 Q	2–1	2 Q	0–3	4
Raymond Bru; Charles Crahay; Albert De Roocker; Max Janlet; Pierre Pêcher; Jean Verbrugge	Men's team foil	2–1	2 Q	2–1	2 Q	1–0	1 Q	0–2–1	4
Modeste Cuypers; Gaston Kaanen; Jacques Kesteloot; Joseph Stordeur; Édouard Yves	Men's team sabre	—N/a		1–0	1 Q	0–2	4	Did not advance	

== Football ==
Summary

Team	Event	Prelim.	Round of 16	Quarterfinals	Semifinals	Final / BM	
Team	Event	Opposition Score	Opposition Score	Opposition Score	Opposition Score	Opposition Score	Rank
Belgium men's	Men's tournament	Bye	Luxembourg; W 5–3	Argentina; L 6–3	Did not advance		5

Men's tournament

Belgium competed in men's football for the fourth time in 1928. The team beat Luxembourg in the round of 16 but was defeated by eventual silver medalists Argentina in the quarterfinals.

Team roster

Head coach: (Austria) Victor Löwenfelt

No.	Pos.	Player	Date of birth (age)	Caps	Club
-	FW	Henri Bierna	2 September 1905 (aged 22)		(Belgium) US Liège
-	MF	Gustave Boesman	19 January 1899 (aged 29)		(Belgium) K.A.A. Gent
-	MF	Pierre Braine	26 October 1900 (aged 27)		(Belgium) K. Beerschot V.A.C.
-	FW	Raymond Braine	28 April 1907 (aged 21)		(Belgium) Beerschot
-	GK	Jean Caudron	15 November 1895 (aged 32)		(Belgium) R.S.C. Anderlecht
-	GK	Jean De Bie	9 May 1892 (aged 36)		(Belgium) Racing Club de Bruxelles
-	FW	Leon De Coninck			(Belgium) La Gantoise
-	DF	Henri De Deken	3 August 1907 (aged 20)		(Belgium) Royal Antwerp F.C.
-	FW	Georges De Spae	30 September 1900 (aged 27)		(Belgium) K.A.A. Gent
-	FW	Gérard Devos	19 August 1903 (aged 24)		(Belgium) Cercle Brugge
-	FW	Jan Diddens	14 September 1908 (aged 19)		(Belgium) K.R.C. Mechelen
-	MF	Georges Ditzler	15 November 1897 (aged 30)		(Belgium) Standard Liège
-	MF	Auguste Hellemans	21 June 1907 (aged 20)		(Belgium) K.V. Mechelen
-	DF	Nicolas Hoydonckx	29 December 1900 (aged 27)		(Belgium) Berchem Sport
-	DF	Jules Lavigne	10 March 1901 (aged 27)		(Belgium) Racing Club de Bruxelles
-	FW	Jacques Moeschal	6 September 1900 (aged 27)		(Belgium) Racing Club de Bruxelles
-	DF	August Ruyssevelt	4 November 1896 (aged 31)		(Belgium) Beerschot
-	MF	Henri Van Averbeke	26 October 1901 (aged 26)		(Belgium) K. Beerschot V.A.C.
-	MF	Florimond Vanhalme	21 March 1895 (aged 33)		(Belgium) Cercle Brugge
-	FW	Sébastien Verhulst	19 February 1907 (aged 21)		(Belgium) Beerschot
-	FW	Louis Versyp	5 December 1908 (aged 19)		(Belgium) Club Brugge
-	FW	Bernard Voorhoof	10 May 1910 (aged 18)		(Belgium) Lierse S.K.

Round of 16

27 May 1928
19:00

Belgium	5–3	Luxembourg
R. Braine 9', 72'; Versyp 20'; Moeschal 23', 67'	Report	Schütz 31'; Weisgerber 42'; Theissen 44'

Olympic Stadium, Amsterdam
Attendance: 5,834
Referee: Lorenzo Martínez (ARG)

Quarterfinals

2 June 1928
16:00

Argentina	6–3	Belgium
Tarasconi 1', 10', 75', 89'; Ferreira 4'; Orsi 81'	Report	R. Braine 24'; Vanhalme 28'; Moeschal 53'

Olympic Stadium, Amsterdam
Attendance: 16,399
Referee: Gamma Malcher (ITA)

Consolation tournament, First round

5 June 1928
14:00

Netherlands	3–1	Belgium
Ghering 4'; Smeets 6'; Tap 63'	Report	P. Braine 85'

Stadion Spangen, Rotterdam
Attendance: 20,000
Referee: Achille Gama (Italy)

== Hockey ==
Belgium competed in men's field hockey for the second time. The team, which had won bronze in the previous tournament in 1920, reached the bronze medal match in 1928. There, they lost to Germany and finished in 4th place.

Summary

Team	Event	Group stage					Final / BM	
Team	Event	Opposition Score	Opposition Score	Opposition Score	Opposition Score	Rank	Opposition Score	Rank
Belgium men's	Men's tournament	India; L 9–0	Switzerland; W 3–0	Austria; W 4–0	Denmark; W 1–0	2 QB	Germany; L 3–0	4

=== Men's tournament ===
Team roster

The following is the Belgium roster in the men's field hockey tournament of the 1928 Summer Olympics.

- Lambert Adelot
- Claude Baudoux
- Yvon Baudoux
- Freddy Cattoir
- Louis De Deken
- Paul Delheid
- Louis Diercxsens
- Auguste Goditiabois
- Adolphe Goemaere
- Georges Grosjean
- Joseph Jastine
- Carl Koning
- René Mallieux
- André Seeldrayers
- Étienne Soubre
- John Van Der Straeten
- Émile Vercken
- Corneille Wellens
- F. Carez
- Ch. de Keyzer
- V. de Laveleye
- Jacques Rensburg

Group play

Pos	Team	Pld	W	D	L	GF	GA	GD	Pts	Qualification
1	India	4	4	0	0	26	0	+26	8	Gold medal match
2	Belgium	4	3	0	1	8	9	−1	6	Bronze medal match
3	Denmark	4	2	0	2	5	8	−3	4	
4	Switzerland	4	1	0	3	2	11	−9	2	
5	Austria	4	0	0	4	1	14	−13	0	

Source: 1928 Official Report, p. 685

18 May 1928
16:30

India	9–0	Belgium
Seaman 5', 55'; Marthins 19'; Khan 28', 29', 36', ?', ?'; Chand 31'	Report

Umpires:
W. Simon (GER)
T. Evekink (NED)

20 May 1928
16:00

Belgium	3–0	Switzerland
Delheid 15'; Diercxsens 34'; Vercken 68'	Report

Umpires:
A. Broese van Croenou (NED)
F. Schiff (NED)

22 May 1928
19:00

Belgium	4–0	Austria
Diercxsens ?', ?', ?'; Baudoux 68'	Report

Umpires:
E. W. C. Ricketts (IND)
B. Turnbull (IND)

24 May 1928
16:00

Denmark	0–1	Belgium
	Report	Seeldrayers 60'

Umpires:
W. Simon (GER)
R. Be-Cavin (SUI)

Bronze match

26 May 1928
14:00

(bronze) Germany	3–0	Belgium
Haag ?', ?', ?'	Report

Olympisch Stadion, Amsterdam
Attendance: 23,400
Umpires:
B. Turnbull (IND)
W. C. Ricketts (IND)

== Modern pentathlon ==
Belgium had the maximum number of pentathletes, three men, in 1928. It was the nation's 2nd appearance in the sport.

Pentathlete	Event	Shooting	Swimming	Fencing	Running	Equestrian	Total	
Pentathlete	Event	Rank	Rank	Rank	Rank	Rank	Score	Rank
Charles Cumont	Men's individual	29	31	28	36	20	144	35
Édouard Écuyer de le Court	Men's individual	27	14	12	25	33	111	27
Charles Vannerom	Men's individual	25	27	26	34	23	135	32

== Rowing ==
21 men represented Belgium in rowing in 1928. It was the nation's 6th appearance in the sport, matching Canada and Great Britain for the most. Belgium entered boats in 6 of the 7 events. None of the boats reached the final in its event, but the coxed pair boat won a bronze medal by being one of the three boats to reach the semifinals. It was Belgium's first medal in the sport since 1912.

Rower	Event	Round 1		Repechage 1		Round 2		Repechage 2		Round 3		Semifinals		Final	
Rower	Event	Time	Rank	Time	Rank	Time	Rank	Time	Rank	Time	Rank	Time	Rank	Time	Rank
Jack Mottart	Men's single sculls	8:14.8	2 R	8:17.0	2	Did not advance									
Philippe Van Volckxsom; Carlos Van den Driessche	Men's coxless pair	8:15.0	2 R	8:36.4	2	Did not advance				—N/a		Did not advance			
André Houpelyne; Achille Mengé	Men's double sculls	8:05.6	2 R	7:56.6	2	Did not advance									
Léon Flament; François de Coninck; Georges Anthony (cox)	Men's coxed pair	8:58.4	1 Q	Bye		8:02.4	2 R	Walkover	1 Q	—N/a		7:59.4	2 ( (bronze) )	Did not advance	
Jean Bauwens; Theo Wambeke; Alphonse De Wette; Charles Van Son; Maurice Delplanck (cox)	Men's coxed four	7:41.8	1 Q	Bye		7:55.4	1 Q	Bye		7:30.2	2	Did not advance			
Marcel Roman; H. Micha; J. Jonlet; A. Lambrecht; Armand Lemaire; Victor Denis; R. Macors; J. Van Malderen; Georges Anthony (cox)	Men's eight	6:47.0	1 R	6:47.8	2	Did not advance									

== Sailing ==
6 men represented Belgium in sailing in 1928. It was the nation's 4th appearance in the sport. Belgium had boats in 2 of the 3 events.

Dinghy

Sailor	Event	Preliminary series				Net points	Prelim rank	Final series				Net points	Final rank
Sailor	Event	1	2	3	4	Net points	Prelim rank	1	2	3	4	Net points	Final rank
Léon Huybrechts	12' Dinghy	2	10 RET	4	9 DQ	25	12	Did not advance					

6 metre and 8 metre classes

Sailor	Event	1	2	3	4	5	6	7	Results	Rank
A. J. J. Fridt (helm); Ludovic Franck; Frits Mulder; Willy Van Rompaey; Arthur Sneyers	6 Metre	9th	2nd	3rd	2nd	4th	4th	4th	2 × 2nd	5

== Swimming ==
Five men represented Belgium in swimming in 1928. It was the nation's 6th appearance in the sport, in which Belgium competed each time Belgium had appeared at the Summer Olympics. None of the Belgian swimmers reached the finals of their events.

Swimmer	Event	Heat		Semifinal		Final	
Swimmer	Event	Time	Rank	Time	Rank	Time	Rank
Martial van Schelle	Men's 100 m freestyle	Unknown	5	Did not advance			
Gérard Blitz	Men's 100 m backstroke	1:18.8	2 Q	DNS	–	Did not advance	
Joseph De Combe	Men's 200 m breaststroke	DNF	–	Did not advance			
Louis Van Parijs	Men's 200 m breaststroke	3:00.0	3	Did not advance			
Gérard Blitz; Pierre Coppieters; Louis Van Parijs; Martial van Schelle	Men's 4 × 200 metre freestyle relay	—N/a		Unknown	5	Did not advance	

== Water polo ==
Belgium competed in men's water polo for the 6th time. For the first time, Belgium failed to win a medal; the team fell to eventual gold medalist Germany in the quarterfinals.

Summary

Team	Event	Round of 16	Quarterfinal	Semifinal	Final / BM	
Team	Event	Opposition Score	Opposition Score	Opposition Score	Opposition Score	Rank
Belgium men's	Men's tournament	Ireland; W 11–1	Germany; L 5–3	Did not advance		5

=== Men's tournament ===
Team roster

Head coach:

No.	Pos.	Player	DoB	Age	Caps	Club	Tournament games	Tournament goals
		René Bauwens	11 March 1894	34	?		2	2
		Fernard Bettens			?		0	0
		Gérard Blitz	1 August 1901	27	?		2	0
	GK	Jules Brandeleer			?		2	0
		Pierre Coppieters	24 June 1907	21	?		2	6
		Henri De Pauw	26 February 1911	17	?		1	3
		Joseph Malissart			?		1	1
		André Mélardy			?		1	1
		J. J. Tensen			?		0	0
		Louis Van Gheem			?		2	1
		Frank Visser	27 June 1907	21	?		1	0

Round of 16

5 August 1928	OR p. 808	Belgium	11–1	Ireland	Amsterdam; Referees: R. Morberger (AUT)
5 August 1928	OR p. 808	Scoring by half: 6–0, 5–1			Amsterdam; Referees: R. Morberger (AUT)

Quarterfinals

6 August 1928	OR p. 811	Belgium	3–5 (OT)	Germany	Amsterdam; Referees: J. Hodgson (GBR)
6 August 1928	OR p. 811	Scoring by half: 2–0, 1–3 OT: 0–2			Amsterdam; Referees: J. Hodgson (GBR)

== Weightlifting ==
Eight men represented Belgium in weightlifting in 1928. It was the nation's 3rd appearance in the sport.

Lifter	Event	Press		Snatch		Clean & jerk		Total	Rank
Lifter	Event	Result	Rank	Result	Rank	Result	Rank	Total	Rank
Albert Maes	Men's −60 kg	72.5	12	75	14	100	13	247.5	16
Ferdinand Renier	Men's −60 kg	72.5	12	77.5	12	105	8	255	11
J. Adriaenssens	Men's −67.5 kg	DNF							–
V. Van Hamme	Men's −67.5 kg	77.5	10	80	11	105	12	262.5	12
M. Van der Goten	Men's −75 kg	77.5	18	87.5	11	115	9	280	11
Jan Van Rompaey	Men's −75 kg	92.5	4	85	12	115	9	292.5	8
Jules Van Der Goten	Men's −82.5 kg	80	12	92.5	12	120	12	292.5	13
Marcel Panen	Men's +82.5 kg	85	16	85	16	115	15	280	15

== Wrestling ==
13 men represented Belgium in wrestling in 1928. Belgium was one of 3 nations (along with Finland and France) to have a wrestler in each event. It was the nation's 5th appearance in the sport. Spapen won Belgium's only wrestling medal in 1928, a silver.

Freestyle

Athlete	Event	Gold medal rounds				Silver medal rounds		Bronze medal rounds		Rank
Athlete	Event	Round of 16	Quarterfinals	Semifinals	Final	Semifinals	Final	Semifinals	Final	Rank
Athlete	Event	Opposition Result	Opposition Result	Opposition Result	Opposition Result	Opposition Result	Opposition Result	Opposition Result	Opposition Result	Rank
Clement Spapen	Men's bantamweight	—N/a	Trifunov (CAN); W	Mäkinen (FIN); L	Did not advance	Bye	Sansum (GBR); W	Already ranked		2nd place, silver medalist(s)
Pierre Bressinck	Men's featherweight	Bye	Morrison (USA); L	Did not advance		Minder (SUI); L	Did not advance	Not qualified		5
Jean Smet	Men's lightweight	Bye	Nilsen (NOR); L	Did not advance		Not qualified				8
Hyacinthe Roosen	Men's welterweight	Jacobsen (DEN); W	Letchford (CAN); L	Did not advance		Not qualified				7
Louis Van Der Herten	Men's middleweight	Bye	Hammonds (USA); L	Did not advance		Not qualified				8
Jacques Van Assche	Men's light heavyweight	—N/a	Rowe (GBR); W	Edwards (USA); L	Did not advance	Not qualified				5
Léon Charlier	Men's heavyweight	—N/a	Wernli (SUI); L	Did not advance		Not qualified				6

Greco-Roman

Athlete	Event	Round 1	Round 2	Round 3	Round 4	Round 5	Round 6	Round 7	Rank
Athlete	Event	Opposition Result	Opposition Result	Opposition Result	Opposition Result	Opposition Result	Opposition Result	Opposition Result	Rank
Pierre Mollin	Men's bantamweight	Bye	Ahlfors (FIN); L Fall 3pts	Gozzi (ITA); L Fall 6pts	Did not advance			—N/a	9
Jacques Dillen	Men's featherweight	Meyer (DEN); W Decision 1pt	Egeberg (NOR); W Decision 2pts	Steinig (GER); L Decision 5pts	Did not advance				9
Frits Janssens	Men's lightweight	Parisel (FRA); W Fall 0pts	Borges (DEN); W Decision 1pt	Sperling (GER); L Fall 4pts	Massop (NED); L Fall 7pts	Did not advance			8
Jean Saenen	Men's middleweight	Poilvé (FRA); W Decision 1pt	Balkema (NED); W Fall 1pt	Papp (HUN); L Fall 4pts	Baytorun (TUR); W Fall 4pts	Kusnets (EST); L Fall 7pts	Did not advance	—N/a	5
Nicolas Appels	Men's light heavyweight	Moustafa (EGY); L Fall 3pts	Clody (FRA); W Fall 3pts	Vávra (TCH); W Fall 3pts	Bye	Rieger (GER); L Fall 6pts	Did not advance	—N/a	4
Gustave Colpaert	Men's heavyweight	Urban (TCH); L Fall 3pts	Donati (ITA); L Fall 6pts	Did not advance				—N/a	11
