= Caudron (surname) =

Caudron is a French surname. Notable people with the surname include:

- Frédéric Caudron (born 1968), Belgian professional three-cushion billiards player
- Georges Caudron (1952–2022), French actor and artistic director
- Jacques Caudron (1882–1938), French footballer and manager
- Jean Caudron (1895–1963), Belgian footballer
