= Athletics at the 1928 Summer Olympics – Men's decathlon =

Men's decathlon at the Games of the IX Olympiad
- Venue: Olympic Stadium
- Dates: 4 & 5 August 1928

Medalists
1st place, gold medalist(s)		Paavo Yrjölä	Finland
2nd place, silver medalist(s)		Akilles Järvinen	Finland
3rd place, bronze medalist(s)		Ken Doherty	United States

The men's decathlon event at the 1928 Olympic Games took place on 4 and 5 August.

== Results ==
=== 100 metres ===
Rank	Athlete	Country	Time	Points	Adjusted Points
1	Johannes Viljoen	South Africa	11.0	904.8	808
2	James Stewart	United States	11.2	857.2	765
2	Akilles Järvinen	Finland	11.2	857.2	765
4	Helge Jansson	Sweden	11.4	809.6	723
4	Adolf Meier	Switzerland	11.4	809.6	723
4	George Weightman-Smith	South Africa	11.4	809.6	723
7	Ken Doherty	United States	11.6	762	683
7	Tom Churchill	United States	11.6	762	683
7	Ludwig Vesely	Austria	11.6	762	683
7	Tatsuo Toki	Japan	11.6	762	683
7	Johan Meimer	Estonia	11.6	762	683
7	Barney Berlinger	United States	11.6	762	683
7	Hermann Lemperle	Germany	11.6	762	683
7	Mátyás Farkas	Hungary	11.6	762	683
7	Branko Kallay	Yugoslavia	11.6	762	683
16	Paavo Yrjölä	Finland	11.8	714.4	643
16	Wilhelm Ladewig	Germany	11.8	714.4	643
16	Sven Lundgren	Sweden	11.8	714.4	643
16	Erwin Huber	Germany	11.8	714.4	643
16	Gheorghe Csegezi	Romania	11.8	714.4	643
16	Con O'Callaghan	Ireland	11.8	714.4	643
16	Gunnar Fredriksen	Norway	11.8	714.4	643
16	Armas Wahlstedt	Finland	11.8	714.4	643
24	Albert Andersson	Sweden	12.0	666.8	605
24	Henry Lindblad	Sweden	12.0	666.8	605
24	Hugo Barth	Germany	12.0	666.8	605
24	Martti Tolamo	Finland	12.0	666.8	605
24	Stelios Benardis	Greece	12.0	666.8	605
24	Gaston Médécin	Monaco	12.0	666.8	605
24	Gunnar Hagen	Norway	12.0	666.8	605
31	Antoni Cejzik	Poland	12.2	619.2	567
31	René Joannes-Powell	Belgium	12.2	619.2	567
31	Ion Haidu	Romania	12.2	619.2	567
34	Yonetaro Nagazawa	Japan	12.4	571.6	531
34	Gérard Noël	Belgium	12.4	571.6	531
34	Virgil Ioan	Romania	12.4	571.6	531
37	Howard Ford	Great Britain	12.8	476.4	461
38	Gaston Étienne	Belgium	13.0	428.8	428

=== Long jump ===
Rank	Athlete	Country	Distance (metres)	Points	Adjusted Points
1	Henry Lindblad	Sweden	6.97	845.65	807
2	Tatsuo Toki	Japan	6.90	828.50	790
3	Adolf Meier	Switzerland	6.89	826.05	788
4	Akilles Järvinen	Finland	6.87	821.15	783
4	Hugo Barth	Germany	6.87	821.15	783
6	Helge Jansson	Sweden	6.85	816.25	778
6	Johannes Viljoen	South Africa	6.85	816.25	778
8	Erwin Huber	Germany	6.79	801.55	764
9	Ludwig Vesely	Austria	6.73	786.85	750
9	Wilhelm Ladewig	Germany	6.73	786.85	750
11	Paavo Yrjölä	Finland	6.72	784.40	748
12	Martti Tolamo	Finland	6.69	777.05	741
13	Mátyás Farkas	Hungary	6.62	759.90	725
14	Ken Doherty	United States	6.61	757.45	723
14	James Stewart	United States	6.61	757.45	723
16	Sven Lundgren	Sweden	6.50	730.50	697
16	Hermann Lemperle	Germany	6.50	730.50	697
18	Gaston Médécin	Monaco	6.46	720.70	688
19	Gunnar Fredriksen	Norway	6.45	718.25	686
20	Johan Meimer	Estonia	6.43	713.35	682
21	Stelios Benardis	Greece	6.37	698.65	668
22	Tom Churchill	United States	6.32	686.40	657
23	Albert Andersson	Sweden	6.30	681.50	652
24	Con O'Callaghan	Ireland	6.28	676.60	648
25	George Weightman-Smith	South Africa	6.26	671.70	644
26	Howard Ford	Great Britain	6.07	625.15	602
27	Yonetaro Nagazawa	Japan	6.04	617.80	595
28	René Joannes-Powell	Belgium	6.03	615.35	593
29	Gheorghe Csegezi	Romania	6.01	610.45	589
30	Barney Berlinger	United States	5.97	600.65	580
31	Gunnar Hagen	Norway	5.95	595.75	576
32	Antoni Cejzik	Poland	5.92	588.40	569
33	Armas Wahlstedt	Finland	5.86	573.70	556
34	Ion Haidu	Romania	5.74	544.30	531
35	Gérard Noël	Belgium	5.70	534.50	523
36	Gaston Étienne	Belgium	5.51	487.95	483
-	Branko Kallay	Yugoslavia	No Mark	0	0

=== Shot put ===
Rank	Athlete	Country	Distance (metres)	Points	Adjusted Points
1	Paavo Yrjölä	Finland	14.11	877	735
2	Akilles Järvinen	Finland	13.64	830	706
3	Helge Jansson	Sweden	13.59	825	703
4	Barney Berlinger	United States	13.05	771	670
5	James Stewart	United States	13.04	770	670
6	Hermann Lemperle	Germany	12.96	762	665
7	Ludwig Vesely	Austria	12.58	724	642
8	Tom Churchill	United States	12.28	694	623
9	Albert Andersson	Sweden	12.19	685	618
10	Adolf Meier	Switzerland	12.15	681	616
11	Antoni Cejzik	Poland	12.11	677	613
11	Howard Ford	Great Britain	12.11	677	613
13	Henry Lindblad	Sweden	12.04	670	609
14	Erwin Huber	Germany	11.92	658	602
15	Ken Doherty	United States	11.85	651	597
16	Mátyás Farkas	Hungary	11.78	644	593
17	Gaston Médécin	Monaco	11.67	633	586
18	Gunnar Fredriksen	Norway	11.56	622	580
18	Gunnar Hagen	Norway	11.56	622	580
20	Hugo Barth	Germany	11.34	600	566
21	Martti Tolamo	Finland	11.31	597	565
22	Johan Meimer	Estonia	11.20	586	558
23	Con O'Callaghan	Ireland	11.07	573	550
24	Tatsuo Toki	Japan	11.03	569	548
24	Stelios Benardis	Greece	11.03	569	548
26	Wilhelm Ladewig	Germany	10.96	562	543
27	Sven Lundgren	Sweden	10.76	542	531
28	George Weightman-Smith	South Africa	10.54	520	518
29	Ion Haidu	Romania	10.51	517	516
30	Yonetaro Nakazawa	Japan	10.37	503	508
31	Johannes Viljoen	South Africa	10.17	483	496
32	Gérard Noël	Belgium	9.95	461	483
33	Branko Kallay	Yugoslavia	9.87	453	478
34	René Joannes-Powell	Belgium	9.83	449	475
35	Gaston Étienne	Belgium	9.65	431	465
36	Gheorghe Csegezi	Romania	9.45	411	453

=== High jump ===
Rank	Athlete	Country	Height	Points	Adjusted Points
1	Paavo Yrjölä	Finland	1.87	916	687
1	James Stewart	United States	1.87	916	687
1	Helge Jansson	Sweden	1.87	916	687
4	Ken Doherty	United States	1.80	818	627
4	Wilhelm Ladewig	Germany	1.80	818	627
6	Akilles Järvinen	Finland	1.75	748	585
6	Albert Andersson	Sweden	1.75	748	585
6	Tatsuo Toki	Japan	1.75	748	585
6	Johan Meimer	Estonia	1.75	748	585
6	Barney Berlinger	United States	1.75	748	585
6	Yonetaro Nagazawa	Japan	1.75	748	585
6	Gunnar Hagen	Norway	1.75	748	585
13	Tom Churchill	United States	1.70	678	544
13	Ludwig Vesely	Austria	1.70	678	544
13	Henry Lindblad	Sweden	1.70	678	544
13	Martti Tolamo	Finland	1.70	678	544
13	Antoni Cejzik	Poland	1.70	678	544
13	Branko Kallay	Yugoslavia	1.70	678	544
13	Gérard Noël	Belgium	1.70	678	544
13	Con O'Callaghan	Ireland	1.70	678	544
13	Johannes Viljoen	South Africa	1.70	678	544
13	Gunnar Fredriksen	Norway	1.70	678	544
23	Hugo Barth	Germany	1.65	608	504
23	Hermann Lemperle	Germany	1.65	608	504
23	Stelios Benardis	Greece	1.65	608	504
23	Mátyás Farkas	Hungary	1.65	608	504
23	Adolf Meier	Switzerland	1.65	608	504
28	Erwin Huber	Germany	1.60	538	464
28	Gheorghe Csegezi	Romania	1.60	538	464
28	Howard Ford	Great Britain	1.60	538	464
28	Ion Haidu	Romania	1.60	538	464
28	George Weightman-Smith	South Africa	1.60	538	464
33	Sven Lundgren	Sweden	1.50	398	389
33	Gaston Étienne	Belgium	1.50	398	389
33	René Joannes-Powell	Belgium	1.50	398	389
33	Gaston Médécin	Monaco	1.50	398	389

=== 400 metres ===
Rank	Athlete	Country	Time	Points	Adjusted Points
1	Akilles Järvinen	Finland	51.4	879.68	745
2	Ken Doherty	United States	52.0	857.12	719
3	Tom Churchill	United States	52.2	849.6	710
3	Ludwig Vesely	Austria	52.2	849.6	710
5	Wilhelm Ladewig	Germany	52.4	842.08	701
5	Sven Lundgren	Sweden	52.4	842.08	701
5	Martti Tolamo	Finland	52.4	842.08	701
5	Mátyáas Farkas	Hungary	52.4	842.08	701
9	James Stewart	United States	52.8	827.04	684
9	Hugo Barth	Germany	52.8	827.04	684
9	Hermann Lemperle	Germany	52.8	827.04	684
12	Antoni Cejzik	Poland	53.0	819.52	676
12	Johannes Viljoen	South Africa	53.0	819.52	676
14	Paavo Yrjölä	Finland	53.2	812	667
14	Helge Jansson	Sweden	53.2	812	667
16	Gaston Médécin	Monaco	53.6	796.96	650
17	Henry Lindblad	Sweden	53.8	789.44	642
18	Albert Andersson	Sweden	54.0	781.92	634
19	Tatsuo Toki	Japan	54.4	766.88	617
20	Erwin Huber	Germany	54.8	751.84	601
21	Johan Meimer	Estonia	55.0	744.32	593
21	Adolf Meier	Switzerland	55.0	744.32	593
23	Gheorghe Csegezi	Romania	55.6	721.76	569
24	René Joannes-Powell	Belgium	55.8	714.24	562
24	Gunnar Fredriksen	Norway	55.8	714.24	562
26	Barney Berlinger	United States	56.2	699.20	546
26	Con O'Callaghan	Ireland	56.2	699.20	546
28	Gunnar Hagen	Norway	56.4	691.68	538
29	Stelios Benardis	Greece	56.6	684.16	531
30	Branko Kallay	Yugoslavia	57.6	646.56	493
31	Gérard Noël	Belgium	58.0	631.52	479
32	Ion Haidu	Romania	59.4	578.88	429
33	Howard Ford	Great Britain	59.8	563.84	415
34	Gaston Étienne	Belgium	1:00.2	548.80	402
35	Yonetaro Nakazawa	Japan	1:01.8	488.64	350

=== 110 metre hurdles ===
Rank	Athlete	Country	Time	Points	Adjusted Points
1	Akilles Järvinen	Finland	15.6	943	751
1	Johannes Viljoen	South Africa	15.6	943	751
3	Ken Doherty	United States	15.8	924	728
3	Ludwig Vesely	Austria	15.8	924	728
3	Albert Andersson	Sweden	15.8	924	728
6	Sven Lundgren	Sweden	16.2	886	684
7	Hugo Barth	Germany	16.4	867	662
8	Paavo Yrjölä	Finland	16.6	848	641
8	James Stewart	United States	16.6	848	641
8	Helge Jansson	Sweden	16.6	848	641
8	Wilhelm Ladewig	Germany	16.6	848	641
8	Adolf Meier	Switzerland	16.6	848	641
13	Tom Churchill	United States	16.8	829	620
13	Tatsuo Toki	Japan	16.8	829	620
13	Erwin Huber	Germany	16.8	829	620
13	Branko Kallay	Yugoslavia	16.8	829	620
13	René Joannes-Powell	Belgium	16.8	829	620
18	Henry Lindblad	Sweden	17.0	810	599
19	Barney Berlinger	United States	17.2	791	579
20	Mátyás Farkas	Hungary	17.6	753	540
21	Hermann Lemperle	Germany	17.8	734	520
21	Con O'Callaghan	Ireland	17.8	734	520
23	Martti Tolamo	Finland	18.0	715	501
23	Stelios Benardis	Greece	18.0	715	501
25	Antoni Cejzik	Poland	18.4	677	464
25	Yonetaro Nakazawa	Japan	18.4	677	464
27	Johan Meimer	Estonia	18.6	658	447
28	Gérard Noël	Belgium	19.4	582	378
29	Gheorghe Csegezi	Romania	20.0	525	330
29	Gaston Médécin	Monaco	20.0	525	330
31	Ion Haidu	Romania	20.4	487	300
32	Howard Ford	Great Britain	20.6	468	286
33	Gaston Étienne	Belgium	20.8	449	272

=== Discus throw ===
Rank	Athlete	Country	Distance (metres)	Points	Adjusted Points
1	Paavo Yrjölä	Finland	42.09	881.44	707
2	James Stewart	United States	40.90	836.22	683
3	Antoni Cejzik	Poland	39.43	780.36	653
4	Ken Doherty	United States	38.72	753.38	639
5	Tom Churchill	United States	38.19	733.24	628
6	Hermann Lemperle	Germany	36.99	687.64	604
7	Akilles Järvinen	Finland	36.95	686.12	604
8	Helge Jansson	Sweden	36.83	681.56	600
9	Albert Andersson	Sweden	36.64	674.34	597
10	Mátyás Farkas	Hungary	35.83	643.56	580
11	Henry Lindblad	Sweden	35.53	632.16	574
12	Ludwig Vesely	Austria	35.46	629.50	573
13	Johan Meimer	Estonia	35.32	624.18	570
14	Sven Lundgren	Sweden	35.04	613.54	564
15	Hugo Barth	Germany	34.89	607.84	561
16	Tatsuo Toki	Japan	34.01	574.40	544
17	Adolf Meier	Switzerland	33.43	552.36	532
18	Erwin Huber	Germany	33.07	538.68	525
19	Martti Tolamo	Finland	32.88	531.46	521
20	Howard Ford	Great Britain	32.82	529.18	520
21	Barney Berlinger	United States	32.51	517.40	514
22	Branko Kallay	Yugoslavia	32.24	507.14	509
23	Con O'Callaghan	Ireland	31.69	486.24	498
24	Ion Haidu	Romania	31.59	482.44	496
25	Yonetaro Nakazawa	Japan	31.43	476.36	493
26	Stelios Benardis	Greece	31.41	475.60	492
27	Wilhelm Ladewig	Germany	30.74	450.14	479
28	Gaston Médécin	Monaco	30.71	449.00	478
29	Gérard Noël	Belgium	30.50	441.02	474
30	Gaston Étienne	Belgium	29.81	414.80	461
31	Johannes Viljoen	South Africa	28.95	382.12	444
32	René Joannes-Powell	Belgium	26.73	297.76	401
33	Gheorghe Csegezi	Romania	26.20	277.62	390

=== Pole vault ===
Rank	Athlete	Country	Height (metres)	Points	Adjusted Points
1	Yonetaro Nakazawa	Japan	3.70	865	535
2	Tom Churchill	United States	3.60	811	509
2	Henry Lindblad	Sweden	3.60	811	509
2	Barney Berlinger	United States	3.60	811	509
5	Paavo Yrjölä	Finland	3.30	649	431
5	Akilles Järvinen	Finland	3.30	649	431
5	Ken Doherty	United States	3.30	649	431
5	James Stewart	United States	3.30	649	431
5	Helge Jansson	Sweden	3.30	649	431
5	Albert Andersson	Sweden	3.30	649	431
5	Sven Lundgren	Sweden	3.30	649	431
5	Stelios Benardis	Greece	3.30	649	431
13	Ludwig Vesely	Austria	3.20	595	406
13	Erwin Huber	Germany	3.20	595	406
13	Gaston Étienne	Belgium	3.20	595	406
16	Wilhelm Ladewig	Germany	3.10	541	381
16	Tatsuo Toki	Japan	3.10	541	381
16	Martti Tolamo	Finland	3.10	541	381
16	René Joannes-Powell	Belgium	3.10	541	381
16	Howard Ford	Great Britain	3.10	541	381
21	Hugo Barth	Germany	3.00	487	357
21	Johan Meimer	Estonia	3.00	487	357
21	Mátyás Farkas	Hungary	3.00	487	357
21	Branko Kallay	Yugoslavia	3.00	487	357
21	Gheorghe Csegezi	Romania	3.00	487	357
21	Gérard Noël	Belgium	3.00	487	357
27	Antoni Cejzik	Poland	2.90	433	333
-	Hermann Lemperle	Germany	No height	0	0
-	Con O'Callaghan	Ireland	No height	0	0
-	Gaston Médécin	Monaco	No height	0	0

=== Javelin throw ===
Rank	Athlete	Country	Distance (metres)	Points	Adjusted Points
1	Johan Meimer	Estonia	56.88	886.70	691
2	Ken Doherty	United States	56.56	877.90	686
3	Paavo Yrjölä	Finland	55.70	854.25	673
4	Akilles Järvinen	Finland	55.58	850.95	672
5	Gaston Étienne	Belgium	54.85	830.875	661
6	Hugo Barth	Germany	52.73	772.575	629
7	Tom Churchill	United States	50.93	723.075	602
8	Henry Lindblad	Sweden	49.61	686.775	583
9	Barney Berlinger	United States	48.27	649.925	563
10	James Stewart	United States	48.07	644.425	560
11	Ludwig Vesely	Austria	47.44	627.10	551
12	Wilhelm Ladewig	Germany	46.10	590.25	531
13	Tatsuo Toki	Japan	45.83	582.825	527
14	Albert Andersson	Sweden	45.81	582.275	527
15	Martti Tolamo	Finland	45.79	581.725	527
16	Sven Lundgren	Sweden	45.71	579.525	525
17	Erwin Huber	Germany	45.42	571.550	521
18	Stelios Benardis	Greece	44.48	545.70	507
19	Branko Kallay	Yugoslavia	43.98	531.95	500
20	Antoni Cejzik	Poland	43.96	531.40	500
21	Mátyás Farkas	Hungary	43.13	508.575	488
22	Helge Jansson	Sweden	41.73	470.075	467
23	Hermann Lemperle	Germany	41.05	451.375	457
24	Yonetaro Nakazawa	Japan	40.33	431.575	447
25	Gérard Noël	Belgium	32.64	220.10	337
26	René Joannes-Powell	Belgium	32.56	217.90	335
27	Gheorghe Csegezi	Romania	31.85	198.375	325

=== 1500 metres ===
Rank	Athlete	Country	Time	Points	Adjusted Points
1	Sven Lundgren	Sweden	4:34.8	772.0	713
2	Hermann Lemperle	Germany	4:41.6	731.2	670
3	Wilhelm Ladewig	Germany	4:42.0	728.8	668
4	Paavo Yrjölä	Finland	4:44.0	716.8	655
5	Albert Andersson	Sweden	4:44.2	715.6	654
6	Martti Tolamo	Finland	4:44.8	712.0	650
7	Erwin Huber	Germany	4:46.0	704.8	643
8	Ludwig Vesely	Austria	4:47.0	698.8	637
9	Gaston Étienne	Belgium	4:51.4	672.4	610
10	Akilles Järvinen	Finland	4:52.4	666.4	604
11	Ken Doherty	United States	4:54.0	656.8	595
12	Tom Churchill	United States	4:55.0	650.8	589
13	Gheorghe Csegezi	Romania	5:03.8	598.0	538
14	Hugo Barth	Germany	5:04.6	593.2	534
15	Tatsuo Toki	Japan	5:10.8	556.0	499
16	Antoni Cejzik	Poland	5:11.4	552.4	496
17	Stelios Benardis	Greece	5:13.8	538.0	483
18	Johan Meimer	Estonia	5:16.2	523.6	470
19	James Stewart	United States	5:17.0	518.8	466
20	René Joannes-Powell	Belgium	5:18.6	509.2	457
21	Henry Lindblad	Sweden	5:23.2	481.6	434
22	Helge Jansson	Sweden	5:27.0	458.8	414
23	Branko Kallay	Yugoslavia	5:50.8	316.0	303
24	Yonetaro Nakazawa	Japan	5:54.6	293.2	287
25	Barney Berlinger	United States	5:58.6	269.2	270
-	Mátyás Farkas	Hungary	DNF	0	0
-	Gérard Noël	Belgium	DNF	0	0

=== Final standings ===
Rank	Athlete	Country	Points	Adjusted points	
1st place, gold medalist(s)	Paavo Yrjölä	Finland	8,053.290	6587	OR
2nd place, silver medalist(s)	Akilles Järvinen	Finland	7,931.500	6645	
3rd place, bronze medalist(s)	Ken Doherty	United States	7,706.650	6428	
4	James Stewart	United States	7,624.135	6310	
5	Tom Churchill	United States	7,417.115	6165	
6	Helge Jansson	Sweden	7,286.285	6111	
7	Ludwig Vesely	Austria	7,274.850	6224	
8	Albert Andersson	Sweden	7,108.435	6031	
9	Henry Lindblad	Sweden	7,071.425	5906	
10	Wilhelm Ladewig	Germany	6,881.520	5964	
11	Hugo Barth	Germany	6,850.605	5885	
12	Tatsuo Toki	Japan	6,757.605	5794	
13	Johan Meimer	Estonia	6,733.150	5636	
14	Sven Lundgren	Sweden	6,727.045	5878	
15	Erwin Huber	Germany	6,702.820	5789	
16	Martti Tolamo	Finland	6,642.115	5736	
17	Barney Berlinger	United States	6,619.375	5499	
18	Antoni Cejzik	Poland	6,356.280	5415	
19	Hermann Lemperle	Germany	6,293.755	5484	
20	Stelios Benardis	Greece	6,149.910	5270	
21	Mátyás Farkas	Hungary	6,015.635	5180	
22	Yonetaro Nakazawa	Japan	5,672.175	4795	
23	Gaston Étienne	Belgium	5,256.625	4577	
24	Branko Kallay	Yugoslavia	5,210.650	4487	
25	René Joannes-Powell	Belgium	5,190.650	4780	
26	Gheorghe Csegezi	Romania	5,081.605	4658	
27	Gérard Noël	Belgium	4,606.740	4106	
	Con O'Callaghan	Ireland			DNF
	Howard Ford	Great Britain			DNF
	Gaston Médécin	Monaco			DNF
	Adolf Meier	Switzerland			DNF
	Johannes Viljoen	South Africa			DNF
	Ion Haidu	Romania			DNF
	Gunnar Fredriksen	Norway			DNF
	Gunnar Hagen	Norway			DNF
	George Weightman-Smith	South Africa			DNF
	Armas Wahlstedt	Finland			DNF
	Virgil Ioan	Romania			DNF

Key: DNF = Did not finish, OR = Olympic record
