= Kaldis =

Kaldis is a surname. Notable people with the surname include:

- Aristodimos Kaldis (1899–1979), American artist
- Georgios Kaldis (born 1906), Greek boxer
- Georgios Emmanouil Kaldis (1875–1953), Greek lawyer, journalist, and politician
- Jim Kaldis (1932–2007), Australian politician
