= Humberto Curi =

Argentine boxer

Humberto Curi (June 10, 1905 – August 1981) is an Argentine boxer who competed in the 1928 Summer Olympics.

He placed 4th in the 1928 Summer Olympics, after being eliminated in the quarter-finals of the middleweight class after losing his fight to Fred Mallin of Great Britain.

On his way to the Olympics, his team had a layover in NYC. He met Josephine Calabrase (May 1907(?)-Nov 1963) at the Roseland Ballroom. A year after the Olympics, Humberto immigrated to New York, where he married Josephine Calabrese (27 Apr 1932) and continued to box for nearly 10 years. He and Josephine had one son, Joseph Curi. Humberto Curi was naturalized on 26 May 1942 in NYC (U.S. District Court in Brooklyn).

Joseph Curi married Susannah English and had 4 children. After retiring from the United Fruit Company, Humberto Curi moved back to Argentina, remarried, and lived there until he died.
