= Honoré Chevrier =

Canadian boxer

Honoré Chevrier (1904 – December 26, 1983) was a Canadian boxer who competed in the 1928 Summer Olympics. He was born in Embrun, Ontario. In 1928 he was eliminated in the second round of the middleweight class after losing his fight to Oscar Kjällander.
