= Harry Henderson (boxer) =

American boxer

Harry Havelock Henderson (October 12, 1904 – May 5, 1976) was an American boxer who competed in the 1928 Summer Olympics. He was born in Weston, Massachusetts and died in Virginia Beach, Virginia. In 1928 he was eliminated in the quarter-finals of the middleweight class after losing his fight to the upcoming bronze medalist Jan Heřmánek.

== 1928 Olympic results ==
Below is the record of Harry Henderson, an American middleweight boxer who competed at the 1928 Amsterdam Olympics:

- Round of 32: bye
- Round of 16: defeated Cesar Campuzan (Spain) on points
- Quarterfinal: lost to Jan Heřmánek (Czechosolvakia) on points
