= Georges Pixius =

Luxembourgish boxer

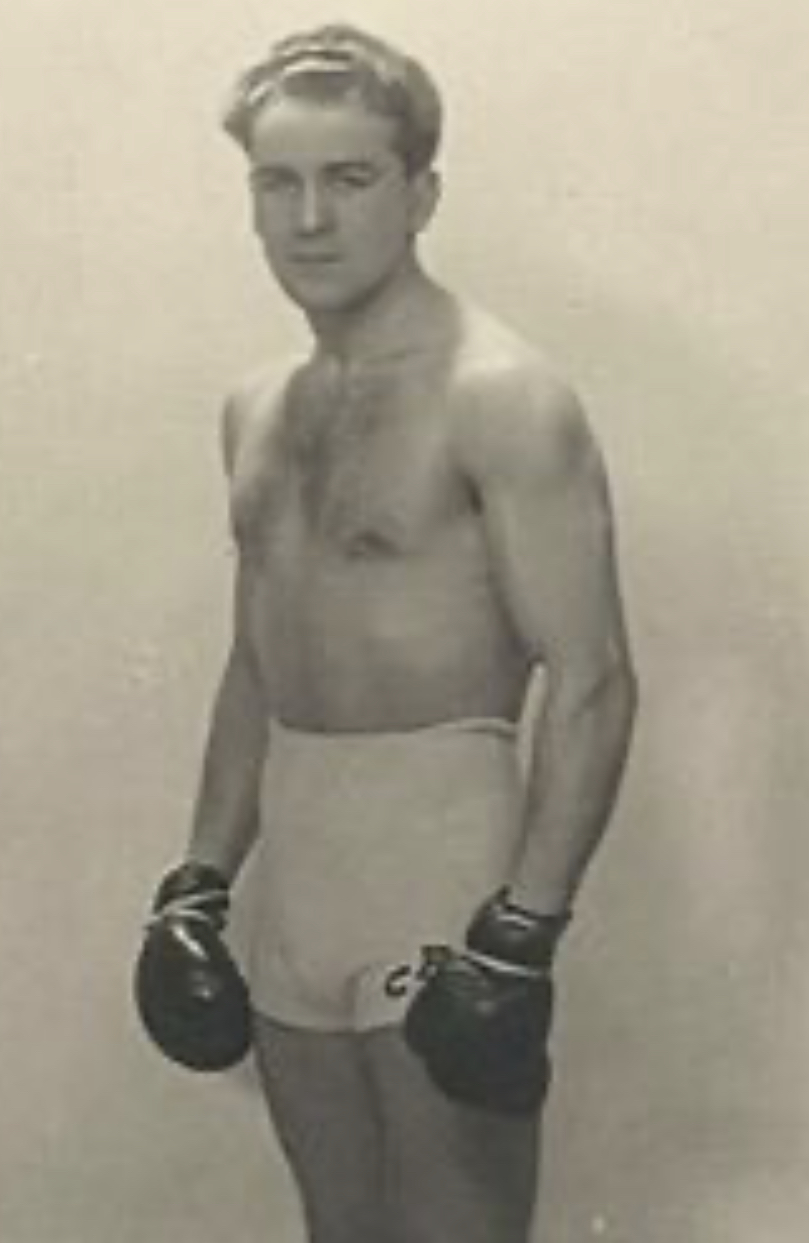

Personal information
- Nationality: Luxembourgish
- Born: 15 January 1901; Rumelange, Luxembourg
- Died: 5 June 1962 (aged 61); Dudelange, Luxembourg

Sport
- Sport: Boxing

Georges Pixius (15 January 1901 – 5 June 1962) was a Luxembourgish boxer. He competed in the men's middleweight event at the 1928 Summer Olympics. In his first fight, he lost to Jan Heřmánek of Czechoslovakia.
