= Boxing at the 1928 Summer Olympics – Middleweight =

Boxing competitions

Men's middleweight boxing at the Games of the IX Olympiad
- Venue: Krachtsportgebouw
- Date: August 7–11, 1928
- Competitors: 17 from 17 nations

Medalists
1st place, gold medalist(s)		Piero Toscani	Italy
2nd place, silver medalist(s)		Jan Heřmánek	Czechoslovakia
3rd place, bronze medalist(s)		Léonard Steyaert	Belgium

The men's middleweight event was part of the boxing programme at the 1928 Summer Olympics. The weight class was the third-heaviest contested, and allowed boxers of up to 160 pounds (72.6 kilograms). The competition was held from Tuesday, August 7, 1928, to Saturday, August 11, 1928.

== Results ==
Round of 32; August 7
Albert Leidmann (GER)	PTS
Georgios Kaldis (GRE)	L

Round of 16; August 8
Jan Heřmánek (TCH)	PTS
Georges Pixius (LUX)	L
Harry Henderson (USA)	PTS
César Campuzano (ESP)	L
Fred Mallin (GBR)	PTS
Jerzy Snoppek (POL)	L
Humberto Curi (ARG)	PTS
Michel Langlet (FRA)	L
Piero Toscani (ITA)	PTS
Ingvard Ludvigsen (DEN)	L
Oscar Kjällander (SWE)	PTS
Honoré Chevrier (CAN)	L
John Chase (IRL)	PTS
Alf Wilson (RSA)	L
Léonard Steyaert (BEL)	PTS
Albert Leidmann (GER)	L

Quarterfinals; August 9
Jan Heřmánek (TCH)	PTS
Harry Henderson (USA)	L
Fred Mallin (GBR)	PTS
Humberto Curi (ARG)	L
Piero Toscani (ITA)	PTS
Oscar Kjällander (SWE)	L
John Chase (IRL)	L
Léonard Steyaert (BEL)	PTS

Semifinals; August 10
Jan Heřmánek (TCH)	PTS
Fred Mallin (GBR)	L
Piero Toscani (ITA)	PTS
Léonard Steyaert (BEL)	L

Final; August 11
Jan Heřmánek (TCH)	L
Piero Toscani (ITA)	PTS
Bronze medal bout
Léonard Steyaert (BEL)	PTS
Fred Mallin (GBR)	L
