= Zygfryd Wende =

Polish boxer and police officer (1903–1940)

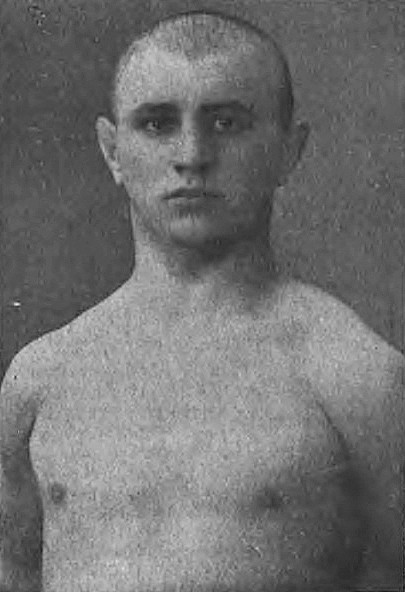

Personal information
- Full name: Zygfryd Wende before 1925
- Nationality: Polish
- Born: 3 January 1903 Roździeń, German Empire
- Died: 11 or 12 April 1940 (age 37) Kalinin, Soviet Union

Sport
- Country: Poland
- Sport: Boxing

Zygfryd Wende (1 January 1903 – 11 or 12 April 1940) was a Polish boxer and police officer. A victim of the Katyn massacre.

== Biography ==
Wende was born on 1 January 1903 in Roździeń (a district of Katowice), Upper Silesia. He was a Silesian. After finishing primary school, he practiced baking in Wrocław.

In 1923, Wende signed up to the boxing section of Lechia 06 Mysłowice. He was employed as a physical worker at a factory in Mysłowice. One of his first successes was a match in October 1924 in Katowice, where he defeated Jerzy Snoppek. In 1925, Wende joined the Polish Armed Forces and served in the 24th Infantry Regiment. He continued his boxing career in the Cestes Warszawa club. He won the Polish lightweight and welterweight championship title three times. He represented Poland at the first European Amateur Boxing Championships in 1925 in Stockholm, Sweden. He trained the boxing section of Czarni Lwów.

In 1928, Wende joined the Silesian Voivodeship Police. He also became a member of the Police Sports Club Katowice. He ended his boxing career in 1930. In total, he won 131 fights, lost 11, and 8 ended in a draw. He worked as a trainer for the Police Sports Club Katowice.

Following the start of the Second World War, Wende and other Silesian policemen were evacuated to the Eastern Borderlands. After the Soviet invasion of Poland, he was taken prisoner by Soviet forces in the area of Tarnopol. He was taken to the POW Camp in Ostashkov, Russia. In April 1940, he was executed with a shot to the back of the head in Kalinin. His remains were buried at the Polish War Cemetery in Mednoye.

== Bibliography ==
- Zdziarski, Maciej (2023), Sportowcy dla Niepodległej: Katyń, Kraków: Instytut Łukasiewicza, ISBN 978-83-967147-0-1
