= Gunnar Fredriksen =

Norwegian decathlete

Personal information
- Nationality: Norwegian
- Born: 28 February 1907 Brandbu, Norway
- Died: 1 May 1994 (aged 87) Oslo, Norway

Sport
- Sport: Athletics
- Event: Decathlon

Gunnar Fredriksen (28 February 1907 – 1 May 1994) was a Norwegian athlete. He competed in the men's decathlon at the 1928 Summer Olympics.
