= Alf Wilson (boxer) =

South African boxer

Personal information
- Nationality: South African
- Born: 10 October 1908
- Died: 16 June 1956 (aged 47)

Sport
- Sport: Boxing

Alf Wilson (10 October 1908 – 16 June 1956) was a South African boxer. He competed in the men's middleweight event at the 1928 Summer Olympics.
