= Albert Leidmann =

German boxer

Albert Leidmann (23 February 1908 – 1 February 1945) was a German boxer who competed in the 1928 Summer Olympics. He was born in Munich. In 1928 he was eliminated in the second round of the middleweight class after losing his fight to the upcoming bronze medalist Léonard Steyaert.

He was killed in action during World War II.
