= Gheorghe Csegezi =

Romanian decathlete

Personal information
- Nationality: Romanian
- Born: 1900 Brașov, Austria-Hungary

Sport
- Sport: Athletics
- Event: Decathlon

Gheorghe Csegezi (born 1900, date of death unknown) was a Romanian athlete. He competed in the men's decathlon at the 1928 Summer Olympics.
