= Jerzy Snoppek =

Polish boxer

Jerzy Snoppek (4 April 1904 – 1944) was a Polish boxer who competed in the 1928 Summer Olympics.

He was born in Katowice.

In 1928 he was eliminated in the second round of the middleweight class after losing his fight to Fred Mallin.

Snoppek was conscripted into the Wehrmacht during World War II and went missing in 1944.
