= Tom Churchill (athlete) =

American Olympic decathlete

- Churchill's OU basketball photo

Biographical details
- Born: February 26, 1908; Blair, Oklahoma, U.S.
- Died: April 29, 1963 (aged 55); Sacramento, California, U.S.

Playing career

Football
- 1927–1929: Oklahoma

Basketball
- 1927–1930: Oklahoma

Baseball
- 1930: Oklahoma
- Positions: End (football); Forward (basketball); Pitcher (baseball)

Coaching career (HC unless noted)

Basketball
- 1931–1933: New Mexico

Head coaching record
- Overall: 19–13

Accomplishments and honors

Championships
- Basketball: Missouri Valley (1928); Big Six (1929) Baseball: Big Six (1930)

Awards
- Basketball: Consensus All-American (1929); All-Big Six (1929); Football: Third-team All-American (1929); 2× First-team All-Big Six (1928, 1929); Participated in East–West Shrine Game (1929)

Thomas Churchill Sr. (February 26, 1908 – April 29, 1963) was an American star athlete in the 1920s who participated in the 1928 Summer Olympics in Amsterdam, Netherlands as a decathlete, and was a multi-sport standout for the University of Oklahoma between 1927–28 and 1929–30.

== Early life ==
Churchill was born in Blair, Oklahoma. He attended Central High School in Oklahoma City where he has a successful sports career. Churchill participated on the football, track and field, baseball, basketball and swimming teams and was chosen as a scholastic All-American. He also earned all-state honors in both football and basketball, and he was considered the best all-around high school athlete in the state of Oklahoma.

== Amateur sports career ==
=== Early OU days ===
Churchill enrolled at the University of Oklahoma in the fall of 1926, but due to collegiate athlete athletics rules at the time, freshmen were not allowed to play for their schools' varsity teams. He decided to box for his first year and won titles in both light-heavyweight and heavyweight classifications. When he became eligible to play for the school's sports teams as a sophomore in 1927–28, Churchill played for the football and basketball teams and was selected to the All-Missouri Valley Conference Team in basketball. That season, the basketball team finished 18–0 and were MVC champions. Even though he was a star athlete in multiple sports, basketball was considered his best sport.

=== 1928 Summer Olympics ===
In the spring of 1928, Churchill won the Kansas Relays' decathlon event. He repeated as the Kansas Relays decathlon champion in 1929.

Churchill also qualified to participate in the 1928 Summer Olympics as a member of the United States track and field team. In the field of 38 decathletes, Churchill finished in fifth place in the Olympic decathlon competition.

=== Later OU days ===
Churchill returned to Norman in the fall of 1928 for his junior year. While the football team only finished with a 5–3 record and finished third in the Big Six Conference (OU's new athletic conference as of that year), the basketball team had more success. For the second season in a row they were crowned conference champions as they finished with a 13–2 record. Churchill was once again named all-conference, and at the end of the season he was also honored as a consensus All-American.

In 1929–30, his senior year at Oklahoma, Churchill had the most success of his football career. Playing at the end position, and occasionally as a running back, he was honored as an all-conference performer and was also named as a third-team All-American by the United Press and Newspaper Enterprise Association (NEA). He was invited to play in the East–West Shrine Game as well. In the winter, the basketball team failed to three-peat as conference champions, and Churchill also failed to repeat as all-conference and All-American. In the springtime, however, he earned his lone varsity letter as a pitcher for the baseball team. The Sooners had great success that season and were crowned co-conference champions under head coach Lawrence Haskell.

When Churchill's collegiate athletics career was over, he had earned 10 varsity letters in four sports, earned multiple all-conference selections and played on teams that won three total conference championships (not including boxing titles).

== Professional baseball and coaching ==
After college, Churchill signed a contract with the New York Yankees farm league. A damaged shoulder prematurely ended his career. Churchill then went on to coach the University of New Mexico men's basketball team for the 1931–32 and 1932–33 seasons. He was also an assistant football coach at New Mexico.

== Later life and death ==
Churchill later managed the El Macero Country Club in El Macero, California. He died on April 29, 1963, in Sacramento, California, after a surgery for cancer.

== Head coaching record ==
Record table
Season	Team	Overall	Conference	Standing
New Mexico Lobos (Border Conference) (1931–1933)
1931–32	New Mexico	10–6	5–5	3rd
1932–33	New Mexico	9–7	8–6	4th
New Mexico:		19–13 (.594)	13–11 (.542)	
Total:		19–13 (.594)		
