= Jack Chase (Irish boxer) =

Irish boxer

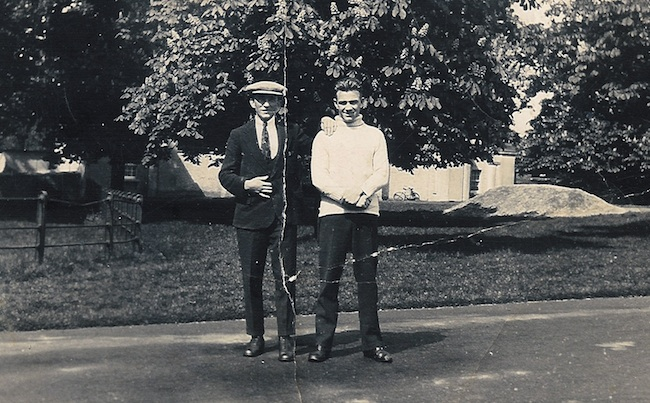
Jack Chase (pictured right)

John Joseph Chase (19 January 1905 – 20 September 1991) was an Irish boxer and a member of the Garda Síochána (Irish Police Force). He joined the Garda in the 1920s soon after Ireland gained its independence from Great Britain. Chase was one of the outstanding Garda boxers of the late 1920s/early 1930s. He won 7 Irish senior championships at middleweight between 1926 and 1932. He was also a beaten finalist in 1925.

== 1928 Olympics ==
Jack Chase boxed in the Middleweight division (160 lbs.) at the 1928 Olympics held in Amsterdam. He had a bye through the First Preliminary Round. In the Second Preliminary Round he defeated Alfred Wilson of South Africa on points. In the quarter-finals Chase was beaten on points by Leonard Steyaert of Belgium who was himself beaten in the semi-final by the eventual middleweight champion, Piero Toscani of Italy.

Chase served as a Garda in Dublin. He was married to Mollie (Mulhall) and lived at first in Kilmainham but later moved to Bulfin Gardens, Inchicore in Dublin. They had Four children. Died 20th September 1991. He is buried in Deansgrange Cemetery in Dublin
