= César Campuzano =

Spanish boxer

Personal information
- Nationality: Spanish
- Born: 1905; Redondela, Spain
- Died: July 1970 (aged 64–65); Buenos Aires, Argentina

Sport
- Sport: Boxing

César Campuzano (1905 – July 1970) was a Spanish boxer. He competed in the men's middleweight event at the 1928 Summer Olympics.
