= Branko Kallay =

Croatian athlete

Personal information
- Nationality: Croatian
- Born: 30 December 1908; Graničari, near Zlatar Bistrica, Austria-Hungary
- Died: 18 November 1995 (aged 86); Zagreb, Croatia

Sport
- Sport: Athletics
- Event: Decathlon
- Club: HAŠK; Marathon

Branko Kallay (30 December 1908 – 18 November 1995) was a Croatian athlete. He placed 24th in the men's decathlon at the 1928 Summer Olympics, representing Yugoslavia.
