= Oscar Kjällander =

Swedish boxer

Oscar Emanuel "Kille" Kjällander (8 November 1901 – 11 June 1979) was a Swedish boxer who competed in the 1928 Summer Olympics.

In 1928 he was eliminated in the quarter-finals of the middleweight class after losing his fight to the upcoming gold medalist Piero Toscani.

Källander represented Djurgårdens IF.

Games	Age	City	Sport	Team	NOC	Phase	Rank	Date	Results	MR
1928 Summer	26	Amsterdam	Boxing	Sweden	SWE	Round One	1	7 August 1928	Kjällander (SWE)	
1928 Summer	26	Amsterdam	Boxing	Sweden	SWE	Round Two	1	8 August 1928	Kjällander (SWE), Chevrier (CAN)	decision
1928 Summer	26	Amsterdam	Boxing	Sweden	SWE	Quarter-Finals	2	9 August 1928	Toscani (ITA), Kjällander (SWE)	
