= Michel Langlet =

French boxer

Personal information
- Nationality: French
- Born: 28 July 1906
- Died: 19 November 1960 (aged 54)

Sport
- Sport: Boxing

Michel Langlet (28 July 1906 – 19 November 1960) was a French boxer. He competed in the men's middleweight event at the 1928 Summer Olympics.
