= Gunnar Hagen =

Norwegian decathlete

Personal information
- Nationality: Norwegian
- Born: 11 June 1904 Tingvoll Municipality, Norway
- Died: 6 April 1969 (aged 64) Oppland county, Norway

Sport
- Sport: Athletics
- Event: Decathlon

Gunnar Hagen (11 June 1904 – 6 April 1969) was a Norwegian athlete. He competed in the men's decathlon at the 1928 Summer Olympics.
