= Tatsuo Toki =

Japanese decathlete

Personal information
- Nationality: Japanese
- Born: 31 March 1904 Nakagawa, Tokushima, Japan
- Died: 26 October 1967 (aged 63)

Sport
- Sport: Athletics
- Event: Decathlon

Tatsuo Toki (斎 辰雄, Toki Tatsuo; 31 March 1904 – 26 October 1967) was a Japanese decathlete. He competed in the men's decathlon at the 1928 Summer Olympics.
