= Hermann Lemperle =

German decathlete

Personal information
- Nationality: German
- Born: 22 May 1906; Biberach an der Riss, German Empire
- Died: 19 September 1983 (aged 77); Stuttgart, West Germany

Sport
- Sport: Athletics
- Event: Decathlon

Hermann Lemperle (22 May 1906 – 19 September 1983) was a German athlete. He competed in the men's decathlon at the 1928 Summer Olympics.
