= Gaston Étienne =

Belgian athlete

Personal information
- Nationality: Belgian
- Born: 21 February 1902
- Died: 2 April 1995 (aged 93)

Sport
- Sport: Athletics
- Events: Javelin throw Decathlon

Gaston Étienne (21 February 1902 – 2 April 1995) was a Belgian athlete. He competed in the men's javelin throw and the men's decathlon at the 1928 Summer Olympics.
