= François Prinsen =

Belgian sprinter

Personal information
- Nationality: Belgian
- Born: 30 December 1905

Sport
- Sport: Sprinting
- Event: 200 metres

François Prinsen (born 30 December 1905, date of death unknown) was a Belgian sprinter. He competed in the men's 200 metres at the 1928 Summer Olympics.
