= Willy Dujardin =

Belgian sprinter

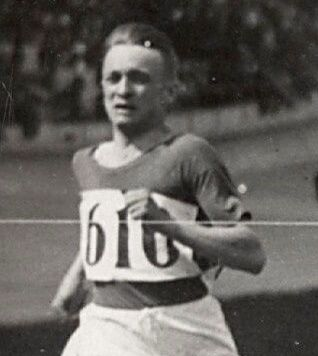
- Dujardin, 1928 Olympics

Personal information
- Nationality: Belgian
- Born: 28 October 1902
- Died: 19 October 1972 (aged 69)

Sport
- Sport: Sprinting
- Event: 100 metres

Willy Dujardin (28 October 1902 – 19 October 1972) was a Belgian sprinter. He competed in the men's 100 metres at the 1928 Summer Olympics.
