= Sidonie Verschueren =

Belgian sprinter and high jumper

Personal information
- Nationality: Belgian

Sport
- Sport: Sprinting
- Event: 100 metres

Sidonie Verschueren was a Belgian sprinter. She competed in the women's 100 metres at the 1928 Summer Olympics.
