= Juliette Segers =

Belgian sprinter

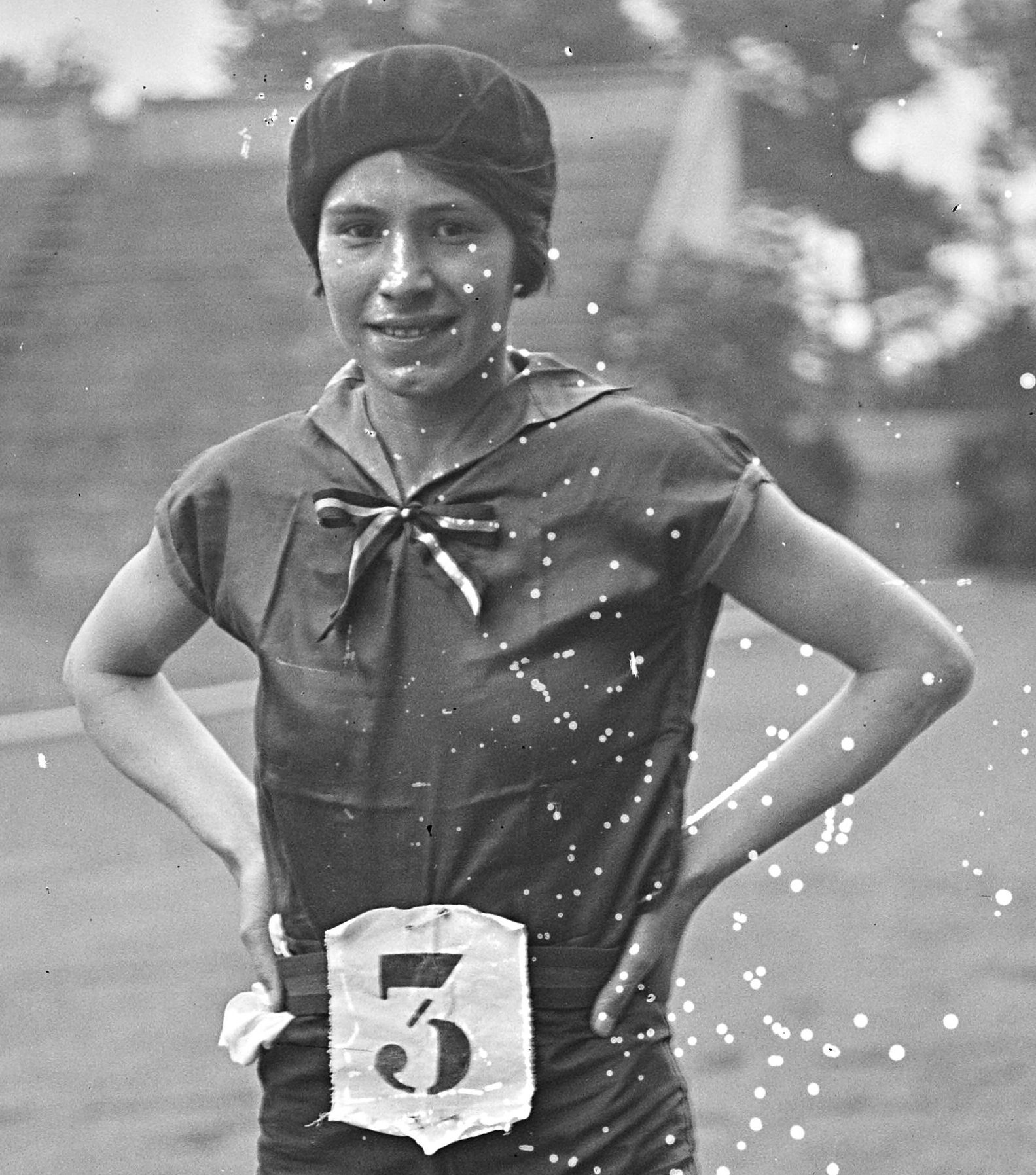
- Juliette Segers in 1929

Personal information
- Nationality: Belgian
- Born: 18 May 1911

Sport
- Sport: Athletics
- Event(s): 4 × 100 metres relay and 800 meters

Juliette Segers (born 18 May 1911, date of death unknown) was a Belgian sprinter. She competed in the women's 4 × 100 metres relay and women's 800 meters at the 1928 Summer Olympics and was eliminated in the preliminary heats of both events.
