= Gaston Kaanen =

Belgian fencer 1892–1970

Gerard Kaanen
Personal information
- Full name: Gerardus Kaanen
- Born: 22 August 1892 Hechtel-Eksel, Belgium
- Died: 4 May 1970 (aged 77) Ghent, Belgium

Sport
- Sport: Fencing

Gerardus Kaanen (22 August 1892 – 4 May 1970) was a Belgian fencer. He competed in the team sabre event at the 1928 Summer Olympics.
