= Gustave Boesman =

Belgian footballer

Personal information
- Date of birth: 19 January 1899
- Date of death: 15 November 1971 (aged 72)
- Position: Midfielder

Senior career*
Years	Team	Apps	(Gls)
1920–1929	K.A.A. Gent		

International career
1926–1929	Belgium	20	(0)
- * Club domestic league appearances and goals

Gustave Boesman (19 January 1899 – 15 November 1971) was a Belgian footballer. He competed in the men's tournament at the 1928 Summer Olympics.
