= Roger Delrue =

Belgian equestrian

Personal information
- Nationality: Belgian
- Born: 26 April 1883

Sport
- Sport: Equestrian

Roger Delrue (born 26 April 1883, date of death unknown) was a Belgian equestrian. He competed at the 1924 Summer Olympics and the 1928 Summer Olympics.
