= Gérard Noël =

Belgian athletics competitor

Personal information
- Nationality: Belgian
- Born: 24 June 1900
- Died: 11 June 1963 (aged 62)

Sport
- Sport: Athletics
- Event: Pole vault

Gérard Noël (24 June 1900 – 11 June 1963) was a Belgian athlete. He competed in the men's pole vault and the men's decathlon at the 1928 Summer Olympics.
