= Ferdinand Renier =

Belgian weightlifter

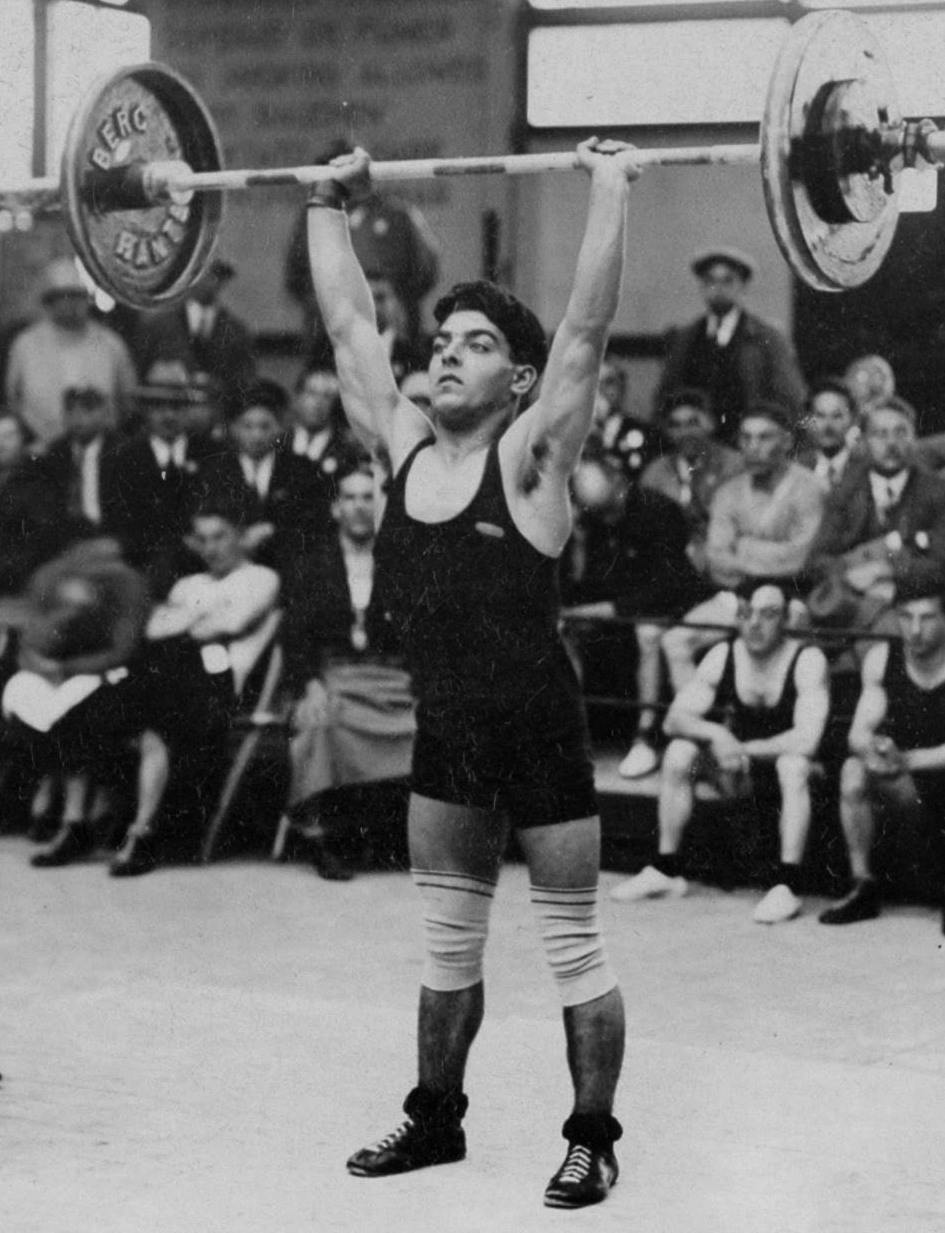
- Ferdinand Renier at the 1928 Olympics

Personal information
- Born: 6 December 1906 Verviers, Belgium
- Died: 9 September 1986 (aged 79)

Sport
- Country: Belgium
- Sport: Weightlifting

Ferdinand Renier (6 December 1906 – 9 September 1986) was a Belgian weightlifter. He competed at the 1928 Summer Olympics in the featherweight category (under 60 kg) and finished in 12th place, among 21 competitors.
