= Adolphe Groscol =

Belgian sprinter

Personal information
- Nationality: Belgian
- Born: 12 May 1904
- Died: 24 August 1985 (aged 81)

Sport
- Sport: Sprinting
- Event: 100 metres

Adolphe Groscol (12 May 1904 – 24 August 1985) was a Belgian sprinter. He competed in the men's 100 metres at the 1928 Summer Olympics.
