= Sven Lundgren (decathlete) =

Swedish decathlete (1901–1982)

Personal information
- Born: 17 July 1901 Gävle, Gävleborg, Sweden
- Died: 30 October 1982 (aged 81) Täby, Stockholm, Sweden

Sport
- Sport: Athletics
- Event: Decathlon
- Club: Gefle IF, Gävle

Achievements and titles
- Personal best: 6202 (1928)

Sven Erik Gunnar Lundgren (17 July 1901 – 30 October 1982) was a Swedish decathlete. He competed in the 1928 Summer Olympics and finished in 14th place.
