= Georges Dambois =

Belgian fencer

Georges Léon Eugène Marie Dambois
Personal information
- Born: 26 March 1887 Liège, Belgium

Sport
- Sport: Fencing

Georges Léon Eugène Marie Dambois (born 26 March 1887) was a Belgian fencer. He competed in the team épée event at the 1928 Summer Olympics.
