= Viktor Löwenfeld =

Austrian footballer and trainer

Personal information
- Full name: Viktor Löwenfeld
- Date of birth: 10 May 1889
- Place of birth: Prague, Austria, Austria-Hungary
- Date of death: 29 April 1962 (aged 72)
- Place of death: Saint Gilles, Belgium
- Position: Defender

Senior career*
| Years | Team | Apps | (Gls) |
| 1909–1911 | Vienna Cricket&FC | | |
| 1911–1919 | Wiener Amateur Sportverein | | |
| 1920–1922 | Concordia Zagreb | | |

International career
| 1909–1918 | Austria | 4 | (0) |

Managerial career
- 192x–192x: Concordia Zagreb
- 1928–1930: Belgium
- 1930–1932: Antwerp FC
- 1936–1938: Antwerp FC
- * Club domestic league appearances and goals

Viktor Löwenfeld (10 May 1889 – 29 April 1962), also spelled Victor Löwenfelt, was a former defending Austrian football player and trainer. He played in Austrian(-Hungarian) clubs, appeared as international and managed Belgian teams among which the Belgium national football team.

== Playing career ==
Löwenfeld played in the defence of Austrian clubs between 1909 and 1918 at the time he was selected for the Austrian football side of Austria-Hungary. One of the clubs was Wiener Amateur Sportverein, the current FK Austria Wien. By 1922 he was playing in Yugoslavia in Zagreb.

== Managerial career ==
In 1925 he was coaching HŠK Concordia in Yugoslavia. At the 1928 Summer Olympics, Löwenfeld made his entrance as manager of the Belgian football team. With this team he reached the quarter-finals, and he would keep coaching the team until 1930. In that year he changed the national squad for Antwerp FC, which he led to the Belgian title in his first season as head coach. In total, he was Antwerp's manager during 4 seasons.

== Managerial palmares ==
Belgium national football team

- 14 matches as trainer (11 friendly, 3 Olympic)
- 1928 Summer Olympics

Place in quarter-finals

Antwerp FC

- Belgian First Division

Winner (1): 1930–31
