= Jules Lavigne =

Belgian footballer

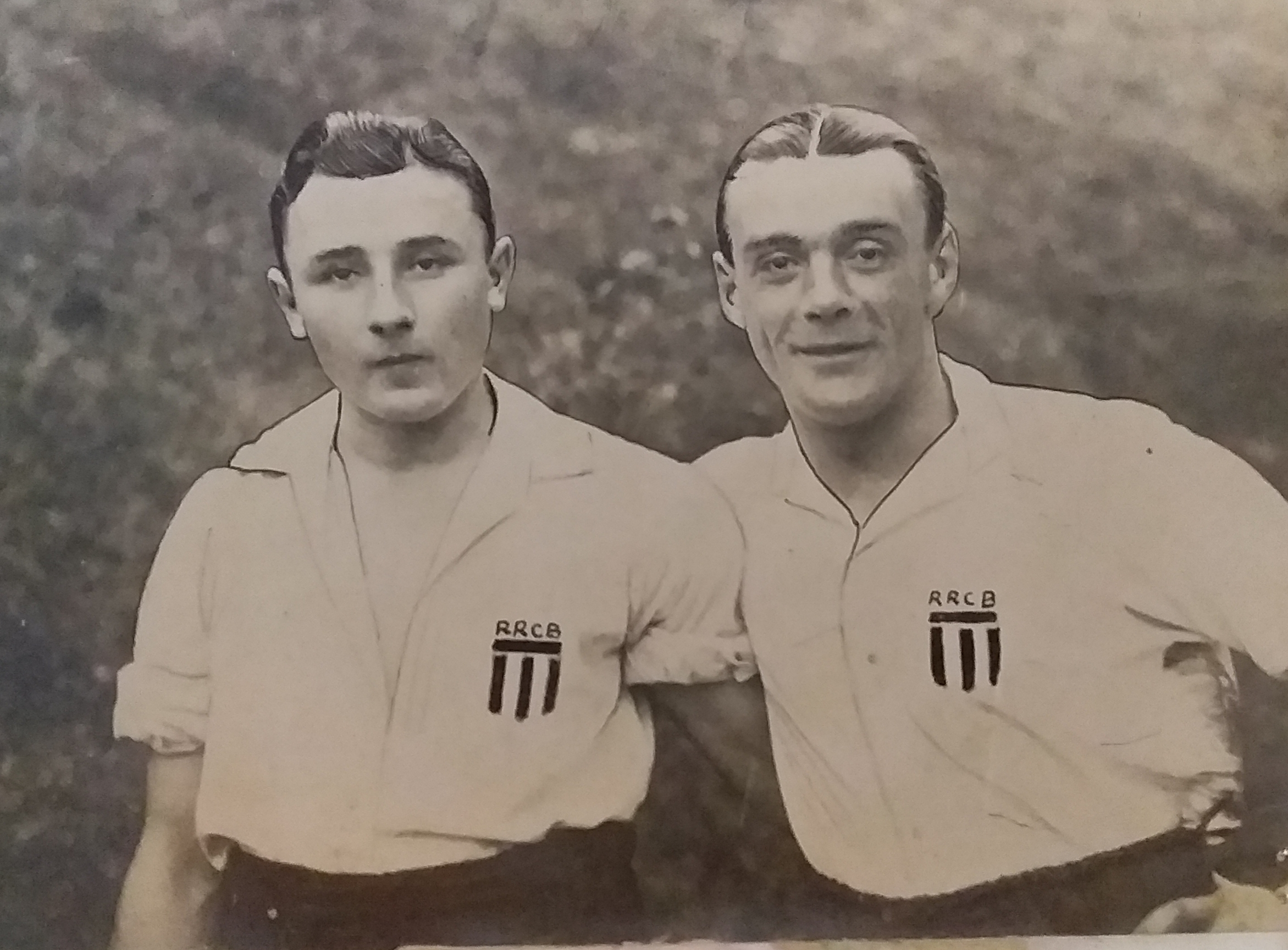
- Photo of Jules Lavigne and team mate Benoit Arys in Racing Club of Bruxelles kit 1930.

Personal information
- Date of birth: 10 March 1901
- Place of birth: Uccle, Belgium
- Date of death: 1957 (aged 55–56)

International career
Years	Team	Apps	(Gls)
- Belgium

Jules Lavigne (10 March 1901 – 1957) was a Belgian footballer. He competed in the men's tournament at the 1928 Summer Olympics.
