= Georges Ditzler =

Belgian footballer

Personal information
- Full name: Georges Leopold Ditzler
- Date of birth: 15 November 1897
- Date of death: 22 October 1974 (aged 76)

International career
Years	Team	Apps	(Gls)
1926	Belgium	3	(0)

Georges Ditzler (born 15 November 1897 - October 22, 1974) was a Belgian footballer. He played in three matches for the Belgium national football team in 1926.
