= Edith Addams =

Belgian fencer

Personal information
- Born: 1 August 1907 Blankenberge, Belgium
- Died: 16 August 2002 (aged 95) Hudson, New York, United States

Sport
- Sport: Fencing

Elisabeth Edith Addams (1 August 1907 – 16 August 2002) was a Belgian fencer who competed in the individual women's foil event at the 1928 Summer Olympics.
