= Georges Caudron =

French actor (1952–2022)

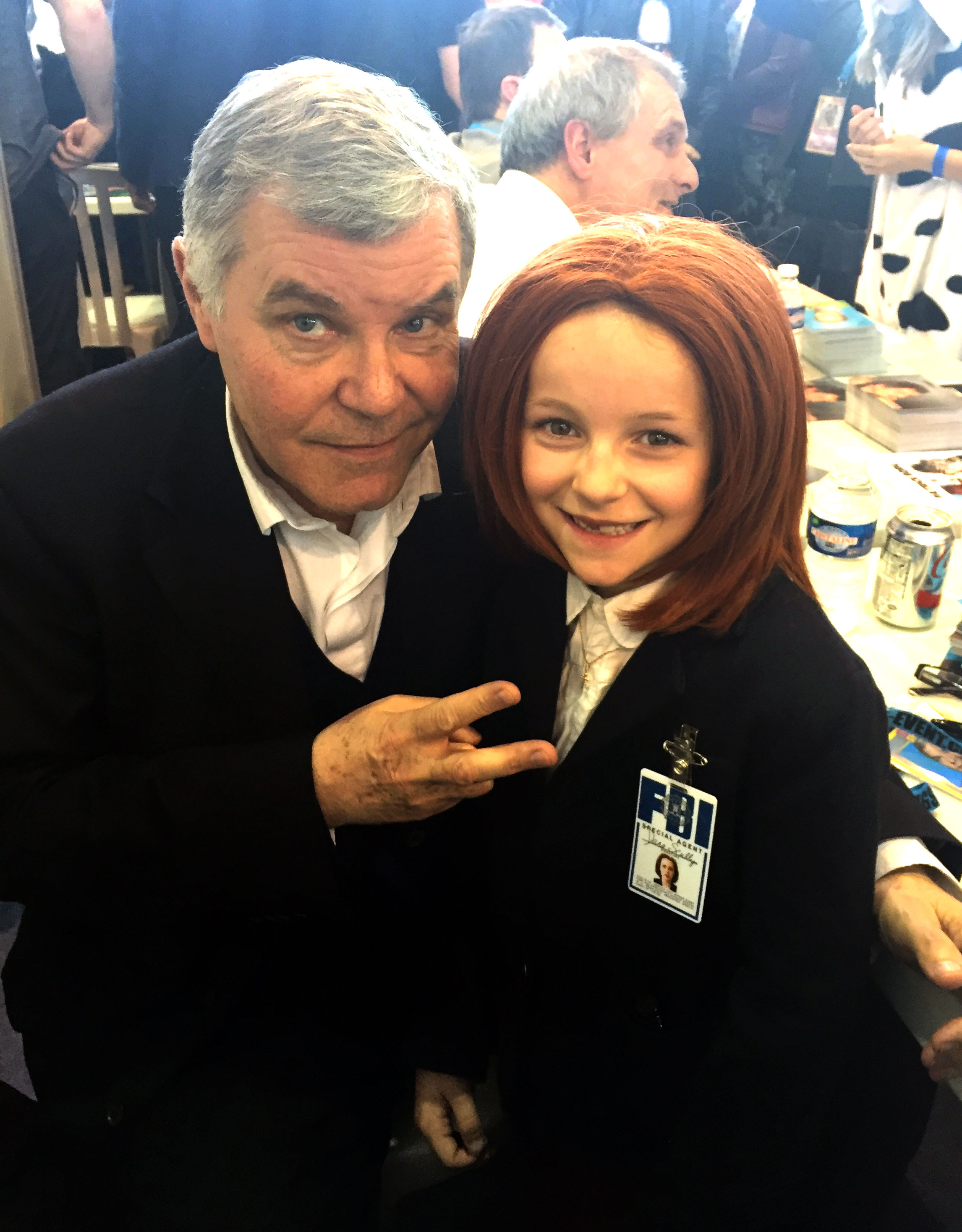
- Caudron in 2016
- Born: 20 November 1952; Malakoff, France
- Died: 5 December 2022 (aged 70); Saint-Denis, Seine-Saint-Denis, France
- Education: National School of Arts and Techniques of Theatre École nationale supérieure des arts et techniques du théâtre
- Occupations: Actor; Artistic director

Georges Caudron (20 November 1952 – 5 December 2022) was a French actor and artistic director. He was very active in dubbing and was notably the French voice for David Duchovny, Steven Culp, John Hannah, Willie Garson, and Peter Bergman.

Caudron studied under Jean-Laurent Cochet at the National School of Arts and Techniques of Theatre École nationale supérieure des arts et techniques du théâtre.

== Filmography ==
=== Cinema ===
- Croque la vie (1981)
- Coup de sang (2006)

=== Television ===
- Adios (1976)
- Au plaisir de Dieu (1977)
- Le Temps des as (1978)
- Madame de Sévigné : Idylle familiale avec Bussy-Rabutin (1979)
- Les Amours de la Belle Époque (1979)
- Au théâtre ce soir (1980)
- Médecins de nuit (1980)
- Les Inséparables (2001)
