= Henri Van Averbeke =

Belgian footballer

Personal information
- Date of birth: 26 October 1900
- Date of death: 1 November 1946 (aged 46)

International career
Years	Team	Apps	(Gls)
1926-1929	Belgium	14	(0)

Henri Van Averbeke (26 October 1900 – 1 November 1946) was a Belgian footballer. He played in fourteen matches for the Belgium national football team between 1926 and 1929.
