= Charles Vannerom =

Belgian modern pentathlete

Personal information
- Full name: Charles Jean Gaspar Vannerom
- Born: 9 July 1896

Sport
- Sport: Modern pentathlon

Charles Vannerom (born 9 July 1896, date of death unknown) was a Belgian modern pentathlete. He competed at the 1928 Summer Olympics.
