= Georgios Kaldis =

Greek boxer

Personal information
- Nationality: Greek

Sport
- Sport: Boxing

Georgios Kaldis was a Greek boxer. He competed in the men's middleweight event at the 1928 Summer Olympics.
