= Léontine Stevens =

Belgian athletics competitor

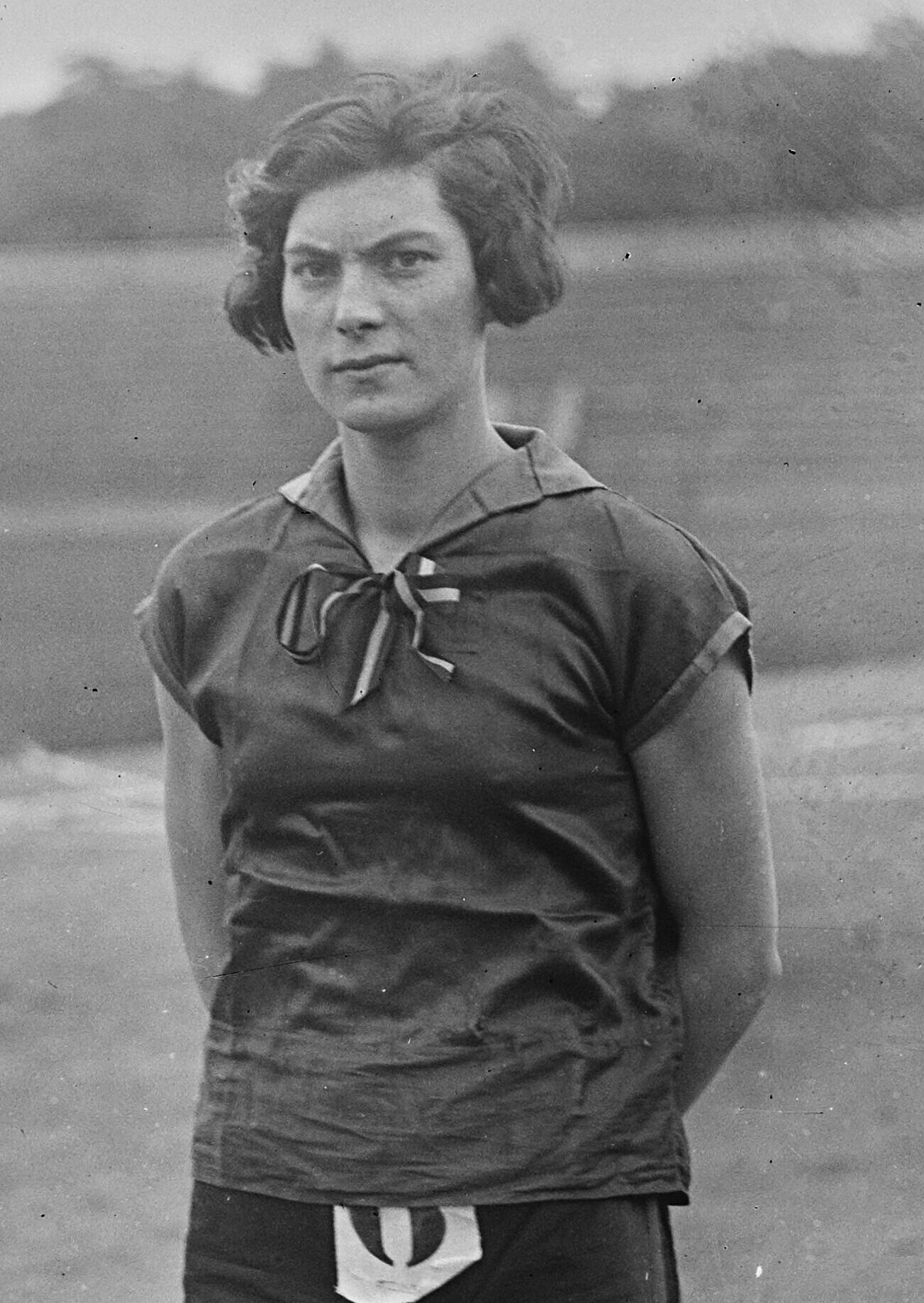
- Léontine Stevens in 1929

Personal information
- Nationality: Belgian
- Born: 12 August 1907 Anderlecht, Belgium
- Died: 16 October 1998 (aged 91) Westende, Belgium

Sport
- Sport: Sprinting
- Event: 4 × 100 metres relay

Léontine Stevens (12 August 1907 – 16 October 1998) was a Belgian sprinter. She competed in the women's 4 × 100 metres relay at the 1928 Summer Olympics and finished tenth in the women's high jump.
