= Pierre Pêcher =

Belgian fencer

Personal information
- Born: 15 April 1907 Antwerp, Belgium
- Died: 23 May 1978 (aged 71)

Sport
- Sport: Fencing

Pierre Pêcher (15 April 1907 – 23 May 1978) was a Belgian fencer. He competed in the individual and team foil events at the 1928 Summer Olympics.
