= August Ruyssevelt =

Belgian footballer

Personal information
- Date of birth: 4 November 1896

International career
Years	Team	Apps	(Gls)
- Belgium

August Ruyssevelt (born 4 November 1896, date of death unknown) was a Belgian footballer. He competed in the men's tournament at the 1928 Summer Olympics.
