= Jacques Kesteloot =

Belgian fencer

Jules Kesteloot
Sport
- Sport: Fencing

Jules Kesteloot was a Belgian fencer. He competed in the individual and team sabre events at the 1928 Summer Olympics.
