= Hilda Deswarte =

Belgian fencer

Personal information
- Born: 8 February 1907 Nieuwpoort, Belgium
- Died: 2 July 1962 (aged 55)

Sport
- Sport: Fencing

Hilda Deswarte (8 February 1907 – 2 July 1962) was a Belgian fencer. She competed in the individual women's foil event at the 1928 Summer Olympics.
