= Eugene Langenraedt =

Belgian sprinter

Personal information
- Nationality: Belgian
- Born: 20 June 1907
- Died: 7 August 1997 (aged 90)

Sport
- Sport: Sprinting
- Event: 400 metres

Eugene Langenraedt (20 June 1907 – 7 August 1997) was a Belgian sprinter. He competed in the men's 400 metres at the 1928 Summer Olympics.
