= Philippe Coenjaerts =

Belgian sprinter

Personal information
- Nationality: Belgian
- Born: 18 April 1903

Sport
- Sport: Sprinting
- Event: 4 × 400 metres relay

Philippe Coenjaerts (born 18 April 1903, date of death unknown) was a Belgian sprinter. He competed in the men's 4 × 400 metres relay at the 1928 Summer Olympics.
