= Jean Caudron =

Belgian footballer (1895–1963)

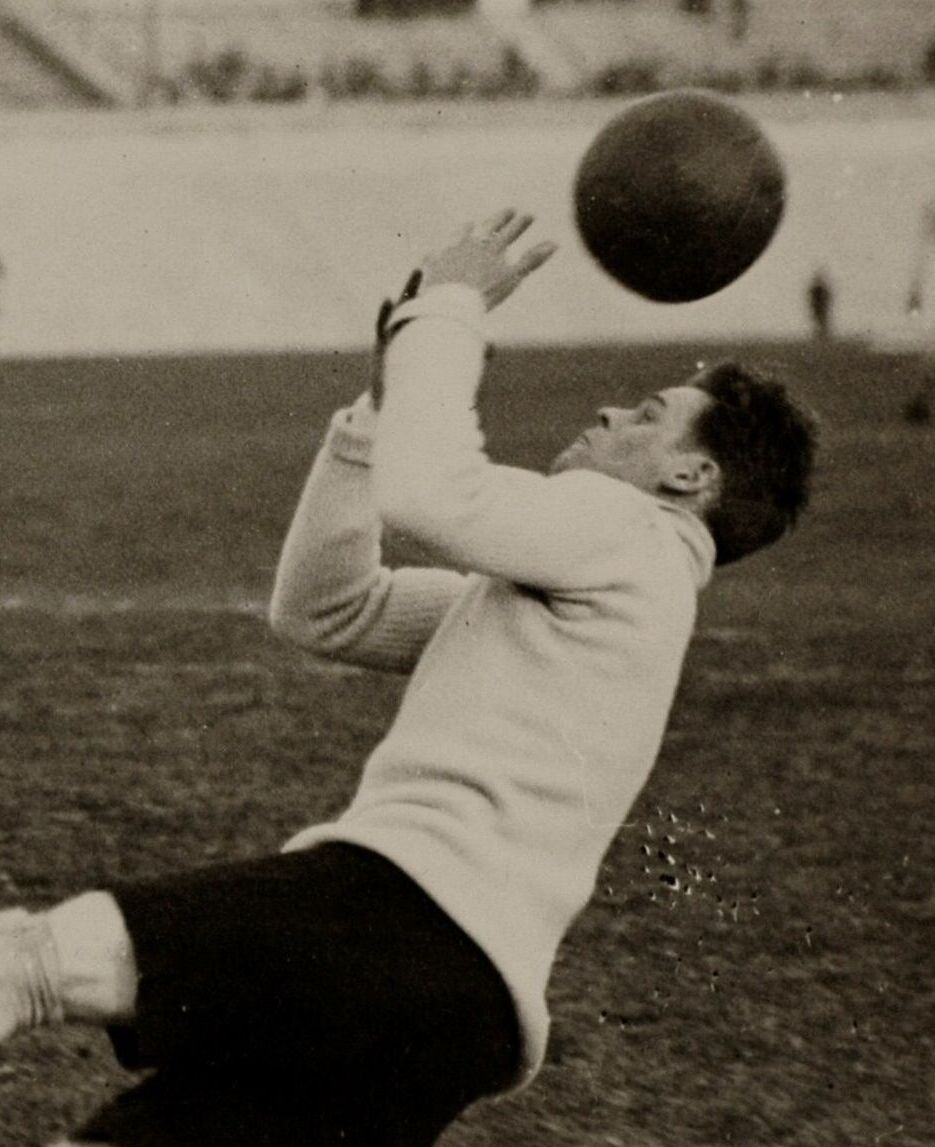
- Caudron in action for Belgium at the 1928 Summer Olympics

Personal information
- Date of birth: 15 November 1895
- Place of birth: Liège, Belgium
- Date of death: 23 January 1963 (aged 67)

Senior career*
Years	Team	Apps	(Gls)
1921–1931	Anderlecht		

International career
1924–1928	Belgium	19	(0)
- * Club domestic league appearances and goals

Jean Caudron (15 November 1895 – 23 January 1963) was a Belgian footballer who played as a goalkeeper.

Known as an extravert spectacle man (he sometimes posed for photographers in the middle of a match), Caudron was the first goalkeeper for Anderlecht in the 1920s.

With the Belgian national team, he competed in the men's tournament at the 1928 Summer Olympics.
