= Jan Heřmánek =

Czechoslovak boxer (1907 – 1978)

Olympic medal record

Men's Boxing
Silver medal – second place	1928 Amsterdam	Middleweight

Jan Heřmánek (May 28, 1907 – May 13, 1978) was a Czechoslovak boxer who competed in the 1928 Summer Olympics.

In 1928 he won the silver medal in the middleweight class after losing the final against Piero Toscani.

He died in Prague.

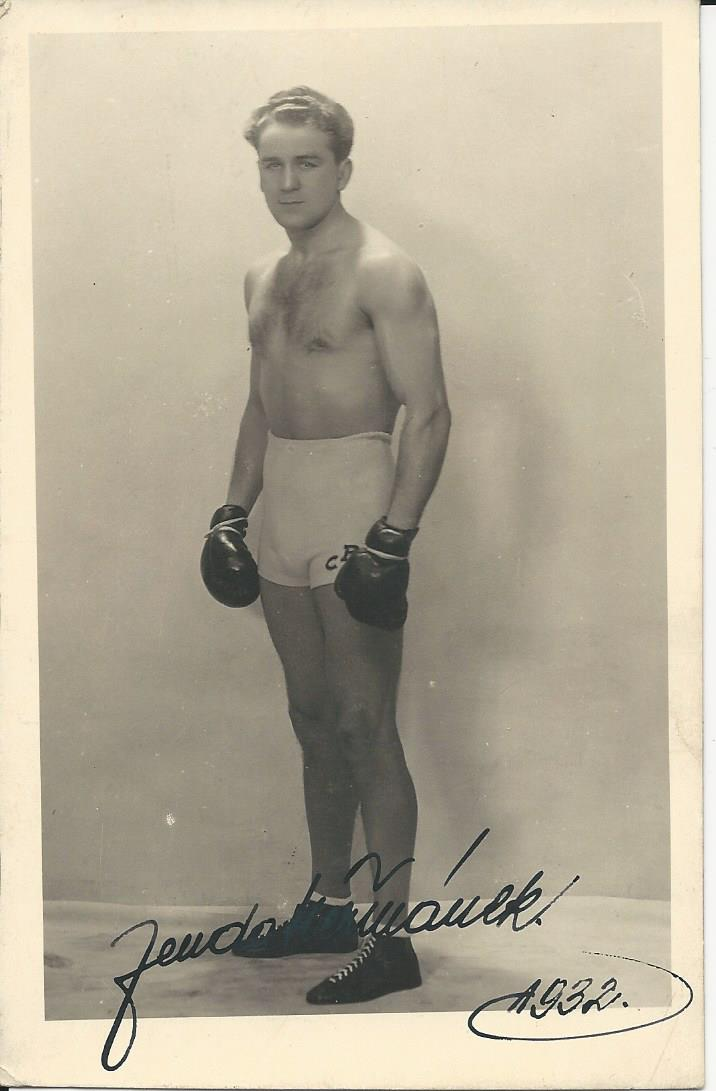
Image of the boxer signed for fan in 1932

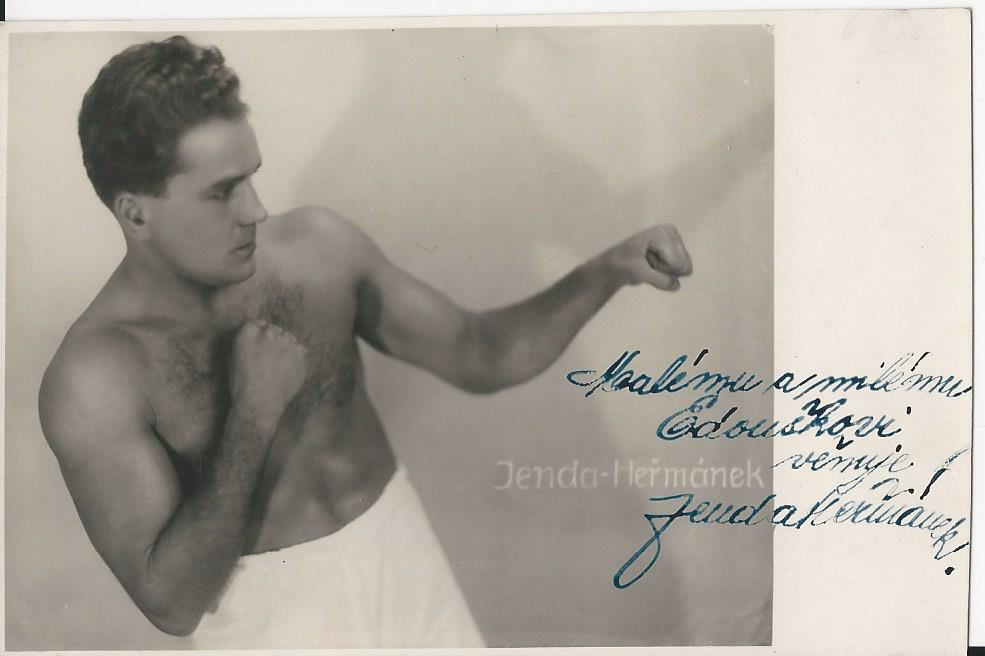
Image of the boxer signed for fan in 1932

== 1928 Olympic results ==
Below is the record of Jan Heřmánek, a Czech middleweight boxer who competed at the 1928 Amsterdam Olympics:

- Round of 32: bye
- Round of 16: defeated Georges Pixius (Luxembourg) on points
- Quarterfinal: defeated Harry Henderson (United States) on points
- Semifinal: defeated Fred Mallin (Great Britain) on points
- Final: lost to Piero Toscani (Italy) on points (was awarded silver medal)
