= René Joannes-Powell =

Belgian hurdler

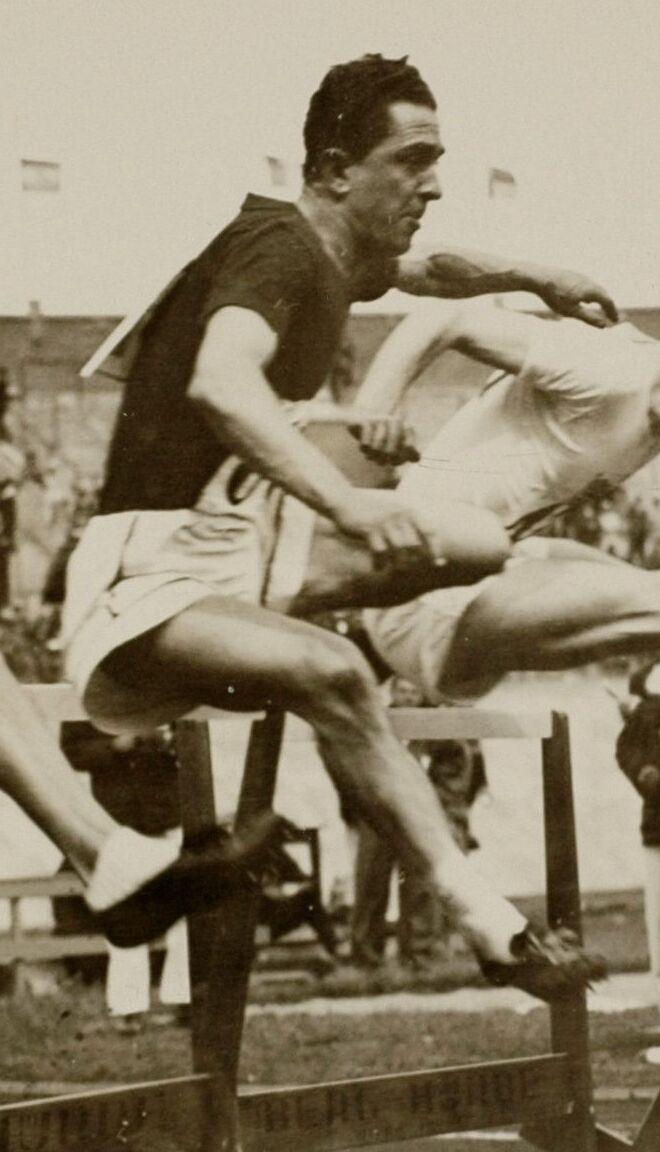
- René Joannes-Powell in 1928

Personal information
- Nationality: Belgian
- Born: 11 February 1896
- Died: 11 May 1940 (aged 44) Liège, Belgium

Sport
- Sport: Track and field
- Event: 110 metres hurdles

René Michel Emile Joannes-Powell (11 February 1896 – 11 May 1940) was a Belgian hurdler.

He had played football for FC Liege until in 1910 he joined in a cross-country run that led him to branch out into track and field sports. He competed in the 110 metres hurdles at the 1920 Summer Olympics and the 1928 Summer Olympics.

In later life active as a sports journalist, he was killed as a spectator in the deliberate destruction of a bridge in Liège to stop the German invasion of Belgium during World War II.
