= Fred Mallin =

English boxer

Personal information
- Nationality: British (English)
- Born: 4 March 1902 Hackney, London, England
- Died: Third quarter 1987 (aged 85) Haringey, London, England

Sport
- Sport: boxing
Medal record
Men's Boxing
Representing England
British Empire Games
Gold medal – first place	1930 Hamilton	Middleweight

Frederick Granville Mallin (4 March 1902 – 1987) was an English boxer who competed for Great Britain in the 1928 Summer Olympics. He fought as Fred Mallin.

== Boxing career ==
In 1928, he finished fourth in the middleweight class after losing the bronze medal bout to Léonard Steyaert. At the 1930 Empire Games he won the gold medal in the middleweight class after winning the final against Dudley Gallagher.

Mallin won the Amateur Boxing Association British middleweight title five times, when boxing out of the Eton Manor ABC. The feat saw him equal his older brother's (Harry Mallin) record of winning five titles.

He died in London.
