= Léonard Steyaert =

Belgian boxer

Olympic medal record

Men's Boxing

Representing Belgium
Bronze medal – third place	1928 Amsterdam	Middleweight

Léonard Emiel Steyaert (11 March 1910 – 2 September 1992) was a Belgian boxer who competed in the 1928 Summer Olympics and won the bronze medal in the middleweight class.

== 1928 Olympic results ==
- Round of 32: bye
- Round of 16: defeated Albert Leidmann (Germany) on points
- Quarterfinal: defeated John Chase (Ireland) on points
- Semifinal: lost to Piero Toscani (Italy) on points
- Bronze Medal Bout: defeated Fred Mallin (Great Britain) on points (was awarded bronze medal)

== Professional career ==
Steyaert turned professional in 1929. He fought all of his bouts in Europe and retired in 1938. He returned for one bout in 1945 before retiring for good with a professional record of 5-12-8 with 1 knockout.
