= Piero Toscani =

Italian boxer (1904–1940)

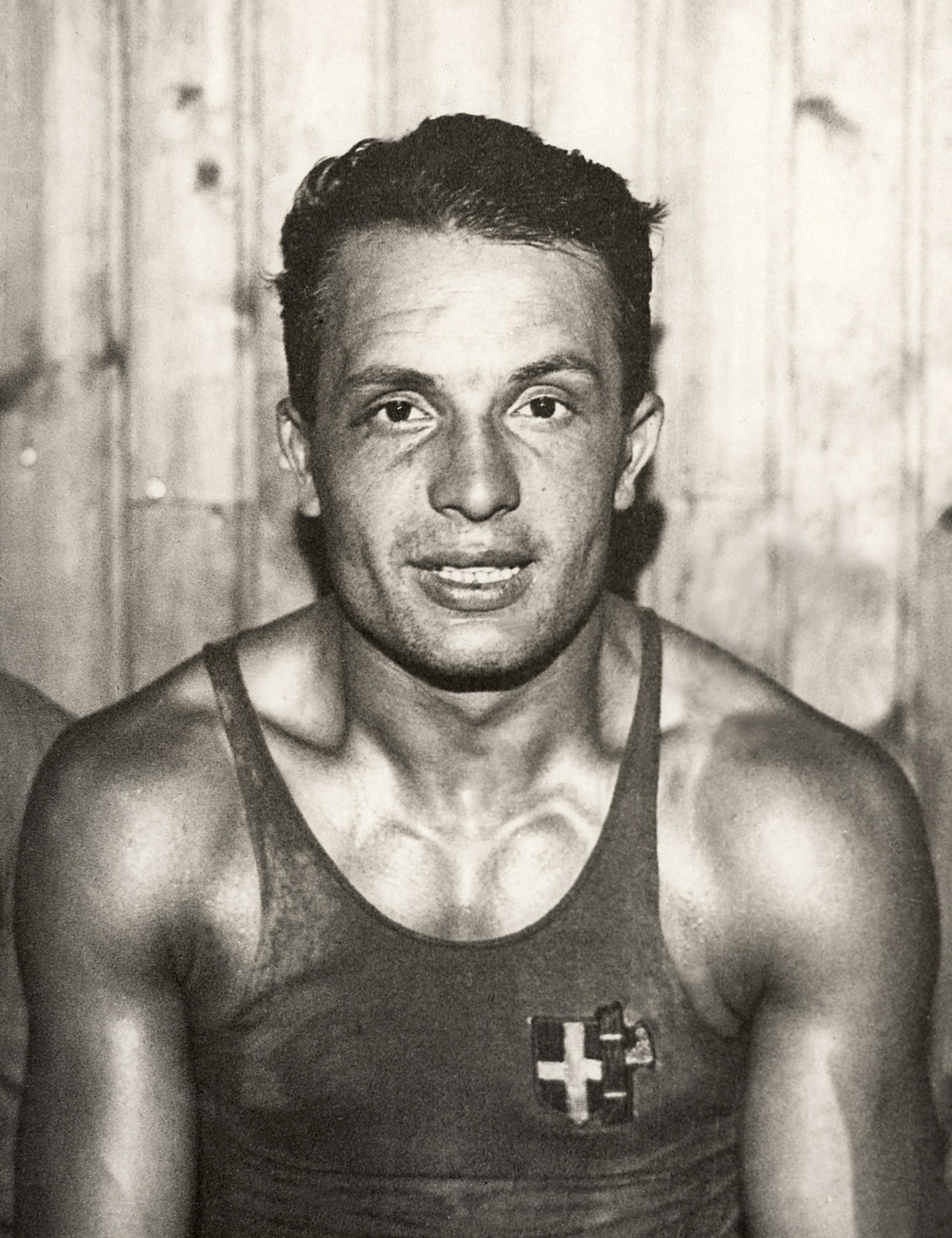
- Piero Toscani at the 1928 Olympics

Medal record

Boxing at the Summer Olympics

Olympic Games
Gold medal – first place	1928 Amsterdam	Middleweight

Piero Toscani (28 July 1904 in Milan – 23 May 1940) was an Italian boxer who won the gold medal in the middleweight class at the 1928 Olympics, after defeating Jan Heřmánek in the final.

== 1928 Olympic results ==
Below are the results of Piero Toscani, an Italian boxer who competed in the middleweight division of the 1928 Amsterdam Olympic Games:

- Round of 32: bye
- Round of 16: defeated Ingvard Ludvigsen (Denmark) on points
- Quarterfinal: defeated Oscar Kjallander (Sweden) on points
- Semifinal: defeated Leonard Stayaert (Belgium) on points
- Final: defeated Jan Heřmánek (Czechoslovakia) on points (won gold medal)
