= Rowing at the 1928 Summer Olympics – Men's coxed four =

Men's coxed four at the Games of the IX Olympiad
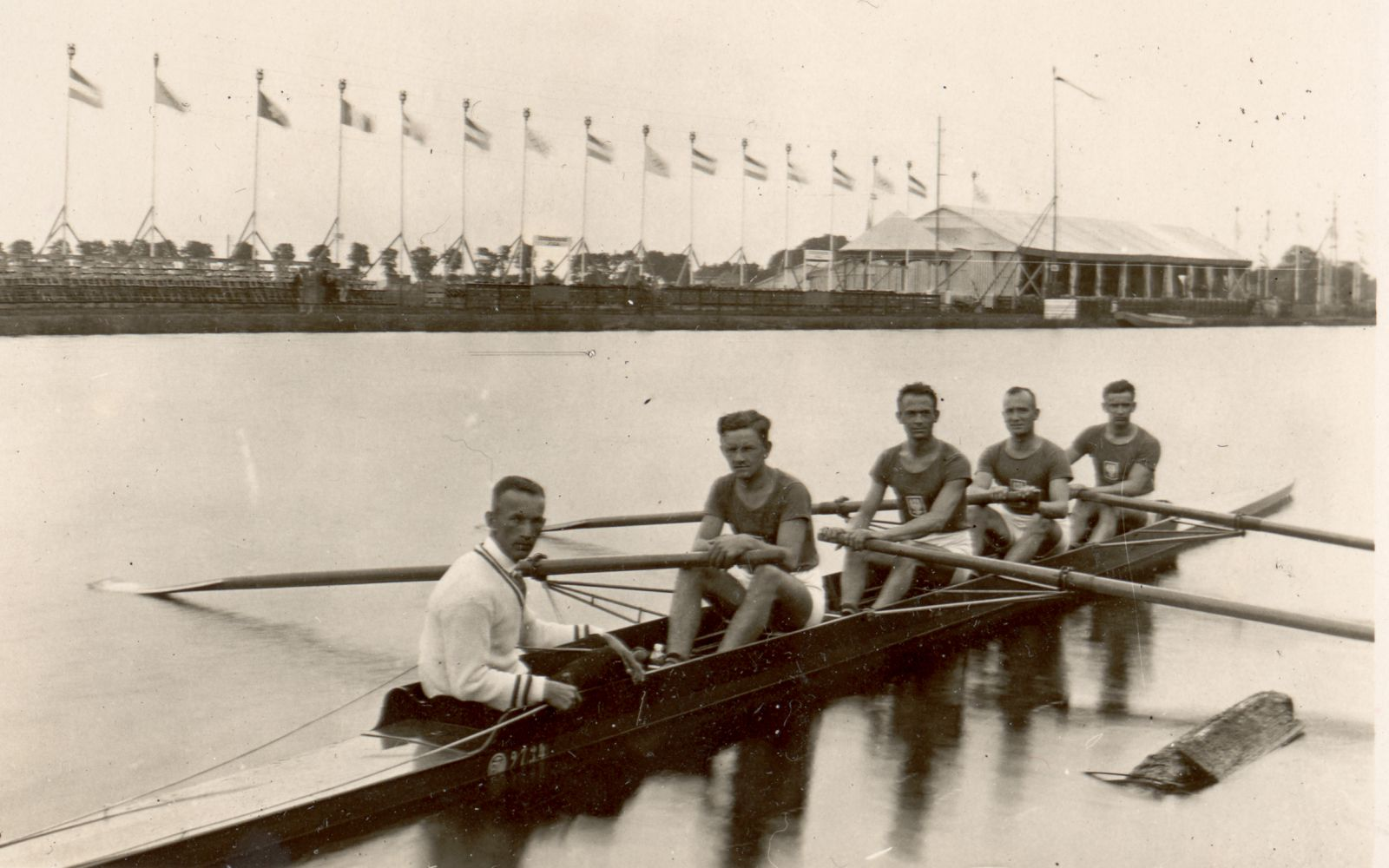
- The bronze medal team from Poland
- Venue: Sloten
- Dates: 3–10 August 1928
- Competitors: 55 from 11 nations
- Winning time: 6:47.8

Medalists
1st place, gold medalist(s)		Italy: Valerio Perentin; Giliante D'Este; Nicolò Vittori; Giovanni Delise; Renato Petronio (cox)
2nd place, silver medalist(s)		Switzerland: Ernst Haas; Joseph Meyer; Otto Bucher; Karl Schwegler; Fritz Bösch (cox)
3rd place, bronze medalist(s)		Poland: Franciszek Bronikowski; Edmund Jankowski; Leon Birkholc; Bernard Ormanowski; Bolesław Drewek (cox)

The men's coxed four event was part of the rowing programme at the 1928 Summer Olympics. It was one of seven rowing events for men and was the fifth appearance of the event. It was held from 3 to 10 August. There were 11 boats (55 competitors) from 11 nations, with each nation limited to a single boat in the event. The event was won by Italy, the nation's first medal in the men's coxed four. The Italian team dethroned two-time reigning champion Switzerland, beating the Swiss crew in both the semifinals and the final. Switzerland's silver medal brought its podium streak in the event to three Games; the United States had its two-Games medal streak end. Poland took bronze, its first medal in the event.

== Background ==
This was the fifth appearance of the event. Rowing had been on the programme in 1896 but was cancelled due to bad weather. The coxed four was one of the four initial events introduced in 1900. It was not held in 1904 or 1908, but was held at every Games from 1912 to 1992 when it (along with the men's coxed pair) was replaced with the men's lightweight double sculls and men's lightweight coxless four.

Eight of the ten nations from the 1924 Games returned, including medallists Switzerland (the two-time reigning champions), France, and the United States. Switzerland was once again among the favourites, with a strong chance for a third straight gold. Italy had won the 1925, 1926, and 1927 European championships (with Switzerland third, second, and second those years), however, and was a significant challenger.

Japan and Monaco each made their debut in the event. Belgium and France each made their fourth appearance, tied for most among nations to that point.

== Competition format ==
The coxed four event featured five-person boats, with four rowers and a coxswain. It was a sweep rowing event, with the rowers each having one oar (and thus each rowing on one side). The competition used the 2000 metres distance that became standard at the 1912 Olympics and which has been used ever since except at the 1948 Games.

With 11 teams, each race limited to two boats, and an expanded repechage system, the tournament featured seven rounds of competition: five main rounds and two repechages. The competition also used a unique semifinal system, with the loser of the one contested semifinal racing against the semifinalist with a bye.

- Round 1 had six heats, five of which had 2 boats and one of which was a walkover. The winner of each (6 boats) advanced to Round 2, with the losers (5 boats) going to the first repechage.
- The first repechage saw one boat (Great Britain) not start, resulting in the 4 remaining boats competing in two heats. The winner of each went to Round 2 (but was ineligible for the second repechage), while the loser was eliminated.
- Round 2 had 8 boats compete in four heats. The winner of each heat (4 boats) advanced to the quarterfinals. For the losers, if they had won their Round 1 heat they went to the second repechage (2 boats); if they had advanced through the first repechage, they were eliminated (2 boats).
- The second repechage had 2 boats. The winner advanced to the quarterfinals, while the loser was eliminated.
- The quarterfinals had 5 boats remaining, so there were 3 heats including one walkover. The winner of each heat moved to the semifinals (3 boats), while the losers (2 boats) were eliminated.
- The semifinals, in a departure from other rowing events, had an unusual structure. With 3 boats, the first semifinal was contested while the second was a walkover. The winner of the first semifinal advanced to the final. However, the loser of the first semifinal then raced against the boat that had a walkover. The winner of that third race advanced to the final, while the loser took bronze.
- There was a single final, with two boats, to determine the gold and silver medals.

== Schedule ==
Date	Time	Round
Friday, 3 August 1928		Round 1 First repechage
Saturday, 4 August 1928		Round 2
Monday, 6 August 1928		Second repechage
Tuesday, 7 August 1928		Quarterfinals
Wednesday, 8 August 1928		Semifinals 1–2
Thursday, 9 August 1928		Semifinals 3
Friday, 10 August 1928	13:00	Final

== Results ==
Source: Official results; De Wael

=== Round 1 ===
Winners advanced to the second round. Losers competed in the first repechage.

==== Round 1 heat 1 ====
Rank	Rowers	Coxswain	Nation	Time	Notes
1	Ernst Haas; Joseph Meyer; Otto Bucher; Karl Schwegler	Fritz Bösch	Switzerland	7:35.6	Q
2	Jean Ruffier des Aimés; Henri Gatineau; Léon le Cornu; Georges Piot	André Decours	France	7:42.0	R

==== Round 1 heat 2 ====
Rank	Rowers	Coxswain	Nation	Time	Notes
1	Sándor Hautzinger; Zoltán Török; László Bartók; Béla Blum	Béla Zoltán	Hungary	7:49.2	Q
2	Harold Ives; L. G. Potter; George Beaumont; Bob Starkey	Arthur Sulley	Great Britain	8:01.0	R

==== Round 1 heat 3 ====
Rank	Rowers	Coxswain	Nation	Time	Notes
1	Franciszek Bronikowski; Edmund Jankowski; Leon Birkholc; Bernard Ormanowski	Bolesław Drewek	Poland	7:31.6	Q
2	Kazuo Nose; Makoto Tsushida; Isamu Takashima; Hachiro Sato	Tsukasa Sonobe	Japan	7:49.0	R

==== Round 1 heat 4 ====
Rank	Rowers	Coxswain	Nation	Time	Notes
1	Karl Golzo; Hans Nickel; Karl Hoffmann; Werner Kleine	Alfred Krohn	Germany	7:19.8	Q
2	Allerton Cushman; Charles Mason; James Hubbard; James Lawrence	Eugene Belisle	United States	7:20.0	R

==== Round 1 heat 5 ====
Rank	Rowers	Coxswain	Nation	Time	Notes
1	Jean Bauwens; Theo Wambeke; Alphonse De Wette; Charles Van Son	Maurice Delplanck	Belgium	7:41.8	Q
2	Alexandre Devissi; Louis Giobergia; Charles Gardetto; Émile Gardetto	Pierre Levesy	Monaco	Unknown	R

==== Round 1 heat 6 ====
Rank	Rowers	Coxswain	Nation	Time	Notes
1	Valerio Perentin; Giliante D'Este; Nicolò Vittori; Giovanni Delise	Renato Petronio	Italy	7:34.6	Q

==== First repechage ====
Winners advanced to the second round, but were ineligible for a second repechage if they lost there. Losers were eliminated. Great Britain did not compete.

==== First repechage heat 1 ====
Rank	Rowers	Coxswain	Nation	Time	Notes
1	Jean Ruffier des Aimés; Henri Gatineau; Léon le Cornu; Georges Piot	André Decours	France	7:48.8	Q
2	Alexandre Devissi; Louis Giobergia; Charles Gardetto; Émile Gardetto	Pierre Levesy	Monaco	8:02.4	

==== First repechage heat 2 ====
Rank	Rowers	Coxswain	Nation	Time	Notes
1	Allerton Cushman; Charles Mason; James Hubbard; James Lawrence	Eugene Belisle	United States	7:43.0	Q
2	Kazuo Nose; Makoto Tsushida; Isamu Takashima; Hachiro Sato	Tsukasa Sonobe	Japan	7:51.4	

=== Round 2 ===
Winners advanced to the third round. Losers competed in the second repechage, if they had advanced by winning in the first round, or were eliminated if they had advanced through the first repechage.

==== Round 2 heat 1 ====
Rank	Rowers	Coxswain	Nation	Time	Notes
1	Jean Bauwens; Theo Wambeke; Alphonse De Wette; Charles Van Son	Maurice Delplanck	Belgium	7:55.4	Q
2	Sándor Hautzinger; Zoltán Török; László Bartók; Béla Blum	Béla Zoltán	Hungary	8:03.4	R

==== Round 2 heat 2 ====
Rank	Rowers	Coxswain	Nation	Time	Notes
1	Valerio Perentin; Giliante D'Este; Nicolò Vittori; Giovanni Delise	Renato Petronio	Italy	7:41.6	Q
2	Karl Golzo; Hans Nickel; Karl Hoffmann; Werner Kleine	Alfred Krohn	Germany	8:04.4	R

==== Round 2 heat 3 ====
Rank	Rowers	Coxswain	Nation	Time	Notes
1	Ernst Haas; Joseph Meyer; Otto Bucher; Karl Schwegler	Fritz Bösch	Switzerland	7:46.4	Q
2	Allerton Cushman; Charles Mason; James Hubbard; James Lawrence	Eugene Belisle	United States	7:49.4	

==== Round 2 heat 4 ====
Rank	Rowers	Coxswain	Nation	Time	Notes
1	Franciszek Bronikowski; Edmund Jankowski; Leon Birkholc; Bernard Ormanowski	Bolesław Drewek	Poland	7:47.6	Q
2	Jean Ruffier des Aimés; Henri Gatineau; Léon le Cornu; Georges Piot	André Decours	France	7:50.8	

==== Second repechage ====
The winner advanced to the third round, while the loser was eliminated.

Rank	Rowers	Coxswain	Nation	Time	Notes
1	Karl Golzo; Hans Nickel; Karl Hoffmann; Werner Kleine	Alfred Krohn	Germany	6:58.4	Q
2	Sándor Hautzinger; Zoltán Török; László Bartók; Béla Blum	Béla Zoltán	Hungary	7:00.4	

=== Quarterfinals ===
The competition became single-elimination from this point, with losers being eliminated even if they had not previously had to advance through a repechage.

==== Quarterfinal 1 ====
Rank	Rowers	Coxswain	Nation	Time	Notes
1	Franciszek Bronikowski; Edmund Jankowski; Leon Birkholc; Bernard Ormanowski	Bolesław Drewek	Poland	7:29.0	Q
2	Jean Bauwens; Theo Wambeke; Alphonse De Wette; Charles Van Son	Maurice Delplanck	Belgium	7:30.2	

==== Quarterfinal 2 ====
Rank	Rowers	Coxswain	Nation	Time	Notes
1	Valerio Perentin; Giliante D'Este; Nicolò Vittori; Giovanni Delise	Renato Petronio	Italy	7:18.4	Q
2	Karl Golzo; Hans Nickel; Karl Hoffmann; Werner Kleine	Alfred Krohn	Germany	7:26.4	

==== Quarterfinal 3 ====
Rank	Rowers	Coxswain	Nation	Time	Notes
1	Ernst Haas; Joseph Meyer; Otto Bucher; Karl Schwegler	Fritz Bösch	Switzerland	8:02.4	Q

=== Semifinals ===
In an unusual procedure, unexplained in the official report, the loser of the first semifinal raced against the team that had a bye in the second semifinal. The winner of this third semifinal advanced to the gold medal final (against the first semifinal's winner), while the loser took the bronze medal.

==== Semifinal 1 ====
Rank	Rowers	Coxswain	Nation	Time	Notes
1	Valerio Perentin; Giliante D'Este; Nicolò Vittori; Giovanni Delise	Renato Petronio	Italy	6:43.4	Q
2	Ernst Haas; Joseph Meyer; Otto Bucher; Karl Schwegler	Fritz Bösch	Switzerland	6:46.8	S

==== Semifinal 2 ====
Rank	Rowers	Coxswain	Nation	Time	Notes
1	Franciszek Bronikowski; Edmund Jankowski; Leon Birkholc; Bernard Ormanowski	Bolesław Drewek	Poland	7:29.4	S

==== Semifinal 3 ====
Rank	Rowers	Coxswain	Nation	Time	Notes
1	Ernst Haas; Joseph Meyer; Otto Bucher; Karl Schwegler	Fritz Bösch	Switzerland	7:01.4	Q
2 ( (bronze) )	Franciszek Bronikowski; Edmund Jankowski; Leon Birkholc; Bernard Ormanowski	Bolesław Drewek	Poland	7:12.8	

=== Final ===
Rank	Rowers	Coxswain	Nation	Time
1st place, gold medalist(s)	Valerio Perentin; Giliante D'Este; Nicolò Vittori; Giovanni Delise	Renato Petronio	Italy	6:47.8
2nd place, silver medalist(s)	Ernst Haas; Joseph Meyer; Otto Bucher; Karl Schwegler	Fritz Bösch	Switzerland	7:03.4
