= Willy Siegenthaler =

Swiss rower

Personal information
- Born: Wilhelm Siegenthaler

Sport
- Sport: Rowing
- Club: RC Reuss Luzern
Medal record
Men's rowing
Representing Switzerland
European Rowing Championships
Gold medal – first place	1924 Zürich	Coxless pair
Gold medal – first place	1925 Prague	Coxless pair
Gold medal – first place	1925 Prague	Coxed pair
Gold medal – first place	1926 Lucerne	Coxless pair
Gold medal – first place	1926 Lucerne	Coxless four
Silver medal – second place	1927 Como	Coxless pair
Silver medal – second place	1927 Como	Eight

Wilhelm Siegenthaler was a Swiss rower active in the 1920s who rowed for RC Reuss Luzern. He won five European titles.

Siegenthaler had his first success at the European level at the 1924 European Rowing Championships in Zürich where he won gold in the coxless pair with Alois Reinhard. At the 1925 European Rowing Championships in Prague, he won gold in both with coxless and the coxed pair, with Reinhard as the fellow rower and Walter Ludin as cox. He gained two further gold medals at the 1926 European Rowing Championships at his base at Lake Lucerne with the coxless pair and the coxless four. At the 1927 European Rowing Championships in Como, he won silver medals with the coxless pair and the men's eight.
