= Rowing at the 1928 Summer Olympics – Men's coxless pair =

Men's coxless pair at the Games of the IX Olympiad
- Venue: Sloten
- Competitors: 16 from 8 nations

Medalists
1st place, gold medalist(s)		Germany; Bruno Müller, Kurt Moeschter
2nd place, silver medalist(s)		Great Britain; Terence O'Brien, Robert Nisbet
3rd place, bronze medalist(s)		United States; Paul McDowell, John Schmitt

The men's coxless pair event was part of the rowing programme at the 1928 Summer Olympics. It was one of seven rowing events for men and was the fourth appearance of the event.

== Results ==
Source: Official results; De Wael

=== Round 1 ===
Winners advanced to the second round. Losers competed in the first repechage.

Heat 1
Rank	Rowers	Nation	Time	Qual.
1	Bruno Müller, Kurt Moeschter	Germany	8:14.2	Q2
2	André Pactat, Robert Guelpa	France	8:31.0	R1

Heat 2
Rank	Rowers	Nation	Time	Qual.
1	Paul McDowell, John Schmitt	United States	8:06.4	Q2
2	Philippe Van Volckxsom, Carlos Van den Driessche	Belgium	8:15.0	R1

Heat 3
Rank	Rowers	Nation	Time	Qual.
1	Terence O'Brien, Robert Nisbet	Great Britain	7:56.2	Q2
2	Alois Reinhard, Willy Müller	Switzerland	7:58.4	R1

Heat 4
Rank	Rowers	Nation	Time	Qual.
1	Romeo Sisti, Nino Bolzoni	Italy	8:12.2	Q2
2	Carel van Wankum, Hein van Suylekom	Netherlands	8:30.0	R1

==== Repechage 1 ====
Winners advanced to the second round, but were ineligible for a second repechage if they lost there. Losers were eliminated.

Heat 1
Rank	Rowers	Nation	Time	Qual.
1	Alois Reinhard, Willy Müller	Switzerland	8:17.8	Q2
2	André Pactat, Robert Guelpa	France	9:01.8	elim.

Heat 2
Rank	Rowers	Nation	Time	Qual.
1	Carel van Wankum, Hein van Suylekom	Netherlands	8:18.4	Q2
2	Philippe Van Volckxsom, Carlos Van den Driessche	Belgium	8:36.4	elim.

=== Round 2 ===
Winners advanced to the semifinals. Losers competed in the second repechage, if they had advanced by winning in the first round, or were eliminated if they had advanced through the first repechage.

Heat 1
Rank	Rowers	Nation	Time	Qual.
1	Romeo Sisti, Nino Bolzoni	Italy	7:21.4	Q
2	Alois Reinhard, Willy Müller	Switzerland	7:29.2	elim.

Heat 2
Rank	Rowers	Nation	Time	Qual.
1	Paul McDowell, John Schmitt	United States	7:12.0	Q
2	Terence O'Brien, Robert Nisbet	Great Britain	7:14.2	R2

Heat 3
Rank	Rowers	Nation	Time	Qual.
1	Bruno Müller, Kurt Moeschter	Germany	7:19.4	Q
2	Carel van Wankum, Hein van Suylekom	Netherlands	7:30.2	elim.

==== Repechage 2 ====
The British boat was the only one that suffered its first loss in the second round, so it had a bye through the second repechage to the semifinals.

Heat 1
Rank	Rowers	Nation	Time	Qual.
1	Terence O'Brien, Robert Nisbet	Great Britain	Bye	Q

=== Semifinals ===
Winners advanced to the gold medal final, with the losers competing for bronze.

Heat 1
Rank	Rowers	Nation	Time	Qual.
1	Bruno Müller, Kurt Moeschter	Germany	7:08.2	QA
2	Paul McDowell, John Schmitt	United States	7:15.6	QB

Heat 2
Rank	Rowers	Nation	Time	Qual.
1	Terence O'Brien, Robert Nisbet	Great Britain	7:08.6	QA
2	Romeo Sisti, Nino Bolzoni	Italy	7:16.8	QB

=== Finals ===
Gold medal final
Rank	Rowers	Nation	Time
1st place, gold medalist(s)	Bruno Müller, Kurt Moeschter	Germany	7:06.4
2nd place, silver medalist(s)	Terence O'Brien, Robert Nisbet	Great Britain	7:08.8

Bronze medal final
Rank	Rowers	Nation	Time
1 ( (bronze) )	Paul McDowell, John Schmitt	United States	7:20.4
2 (4)	Romeo Sisti, Nino Bolzoni	Italy	7:24.4
