= Sisti =

Sisti is a surname. Notable people with this surname include:

- Giancarlo De Sisti (born 1943), retired Italian footballer and football manager and midfielder
- Anthony J. (Tony) Sisti (1901–1983), American artist, art instructor and patron of the arts
- Michael Sisti, American women's ice hockey current head coach at Mercyhurst University.
- Michelan Sisti (born 1949), Puerto Rican-American actor, director, puppeteer, and musician
- Romeo Sisti, Italian rower
- Sebastian Daniel "Sibby" Sisti (1920–2006), American Major League Baseball utility player
- Vittorio De Sisti (1940–2006), Libyan-born Italian director and screenwriter
