= Aiko Sato =

Aiko Sato may refer to:

- Aiko Satō (writer) (佐藤 愛子; 1923–2026), Japanese writer
- Aiko Satō (actress) (佐藤 藍子; born 1977), Japanese actress
- Aiko Satō (judoka) (佐藤 愛子; born 1983), Japanese judoka
