= Bolesław Drewek =

Polish rower

Personal information
- Born: 26 November 1903 Schwornigatz, Conitz
- Died: 11 November 1972 (aged 68) Gdańsk, Poland
- Height: 168 cm (5 ft 6 in)
- Weight: 58 kg (128 lb)

Sport
- Sport: Rowing
- Club: BTW, Bydgoszcz
Medal record
Men's rowing
Representing Poland
Olympic Games
Bronze medal – third place	1928 Amsterdam	Coxed four

Bolesław Drewek (26 November 1903 – 11 November 1972) was a Polish rower of German origin, who competed in the 1928 Summer Olympics.

Drewek was born in Schwornigatz, Conitz in 1903. In 1928 he won the bronze medal as coxswain of the Polish boat in the coxed four event. He died in Gdańsk.
