= Edmund Jankowski =

Polish rower (1903–1939)

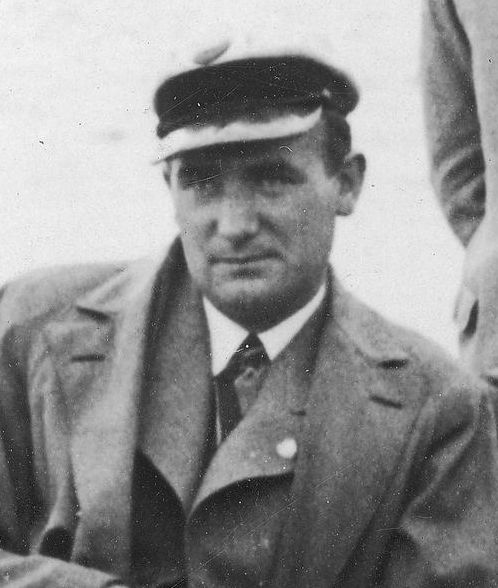
- Jankowski in 1935

Personal information
- Born: Edmund Bernard Jankowski; 28 August 1903 Wrocki, Golub-Dobrzyń County
- Died: 1 November 1939 (aged 36) Bydgoszcz, Poland
- Height: 174 cm (5 ft 9 in)
- Weight: 72 kg (159 lb)

Sport
- Sport: Rowing
- Club: BTW, Bydgoszcz
Medal record
Men's rowing
Representing Poland
Olympic Games
Bronze medal – third place	1928 Amsterdam	Coxed four
European Rowing Championships
Bronze medal – third place	1929 Bydgoszcz	Coxless four

Edmund Bernard Jankowski (28 August 1903 – 1 November 1939) was a Polish rower who competed in the 1928 Summer Olympics.

Jankowski was born in Wrocki, Golub-Dobrzyń County. In 1928 he won the bronze medal as member of the Polish boat in the coxed four event.

He fought in the September Campaign of World War II. Jankowski was executed in the Valley of Death in Bydgoszcz.
