= Rowing at the 1928 Summer Olympics – Men's single sculls =

Olympic rowing event

Men's single sculls at the Games of the IX Olympiad
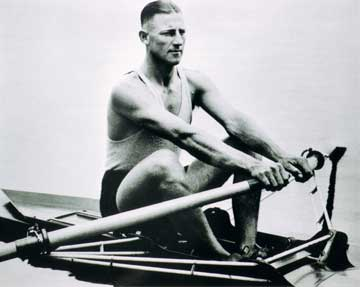
- Gold medalist Bobby Pearce
- Venue: Sloten
- Dates: 3–10 August 1928
- Competitors: 15 from 15 nations
- Winning time: 7:11.0

Medalists
1st place, gold medalist(s)		Bobby Pearce; Australia
2nd place, silver medalist(s)		Ken Myers; United States
3rd place, bronze medalist(s)		David Collet; Great Britain

The men's single sculls event was part of the rowing programme at the 1928 Summer Olympics. It was one of seven rowing events for men and was the seventh appearance of the event, which had been on the programme for every Games since rowing was added in 1900. There were 15 competitors, each from a different nation (as each nation could enter only one boat in the event). The event was won by Bobby Pearce of Australia, the nation's first medal in the event. Silver went to Ken Myers of the United States, extending that nation's podium streak to three Games (and making the nation four-for-four in reaching the podium each time it appeared). David Collet of Great Britain took bronze; that nation had also earned a medal each time it appeared (six times) and had a five-Games podium streak.

== Background ==
This was the seventh appearance of the event. Rowing had been on the programme in 1896 but was cancelled due to bad weather. The single sculls has been held every time that rowing has been contested, beginning in 1900.

None of the rowers from the 1924 Games returned. Two-time medalist and reigning champion Jack Beresford competed in the eight, but not the single sculls. The 1928 Diamond Challenge Sculls winner was Joseph Wright Jr. of Canada; he was the closest thing to a favorite in a relatively open field.

Japan and South Africa each made their debut in the event. Great Britain made its sixth appearance, most among nations, having missed only the 1904 Games in St. Louis.

== Competition format ==
The 1928 competition expanded the repechage system introduced in 1924, giving losing rowers a second chance at advancement. However, the number of rowers in each race was once again limited to two after multiple Games with more than two boats per race. These changes led to the tournament having a total of seven rounds (five main rounds and two repechages).

- The first round had 15 rowers in 8 heats, with one of the rowers having a bye and the other 14 competing one-on-one. The winner of each heat advanced to the second round, while the loser went to the first repechage (as long as he finished the race).
- The first repechage had 6 rowers (one first-round heat was a walkover, one heat saw a competitor not finish). They were placed in 3 heats. The winner of each advanced to the second round while the loser was eliminated. Rowers advancing via the first repechage had a continuing disadvantage to those who advanced directly from the first round, as they were not eligible for the second repechage.
- The second round had 11 rowers, with 10 competing in 5 heats and a sixth heat being a walkover. Winners advanced to the quarterfinals, while losers went to the second repechage (if they had advanced directly from the first round) or were eliminated (if they had already been through the first repechage).
- The second repechage had 4 rowers, competing in 2 heats. The two winners advanced to the quarterfinals, with the two losers eliminated.
- The quarterfinals were the first round without a repechage. Eight rowers had advanced to the quarterfinals; they competed in 4 heats, with winners advancing to the semifinals and losers eliminated.
- The semifinals placed the 4 rowers in 2 heats. Winners advanced to the "A" (gold medal) final, with losers competing in a "B" (bronze medal) final.
- The final round consisted of a gold medal A final (for gold and silver) and a bronze medal B final (for bronze and 4th place).

The course used the 2000 metres distance that became the Olympic standard in 1912.

== Schedule ==
Date	Time	Round
Friday, 3 August 1928		Round 1
Saturday, 4 August 1928		First repechage
Sunday, 5 August 1928		Round 2
Monday, 6 August 1928		Second repechage
Tuesday, 7 August 1928		Quarterfinals
Wednesday, 8 August 1928		Semifinals
Friday, 10 August 1928	13:00	Finals

== Results ==
Source: Official results; De Wael

=== Round 1 ===
Winners advanced to the second round. Losers competed in the first repechage.

==== Round 1 heat 1 ====
Rank	Rower	Nation	Time	Notes
1	David Collet	Great Britain	8:29.6	Q
2	Édouard Candeveau	Switzerland	8:35.8	R

==== Round 1 heat 2 ====
Rank	Rower	Nation	Time	Notes
1	Bobby Pearce	Australia	7:55.8	Q
2	Walter Flinsch	Germany	8:21.8	R

==== Round 1 heat 3 ====
Rank	Rower	Nation	Time	Notes
1	Joe Wright	Canada	7:57.8	Q
2	Bert Gunther	Netherlands	7:58.4	R

==== Round 1 heat 4 ====
Rank	Rower	Nation	Time	Notes
1	Vincent Saurin	France	8:09.2	Q
2	Jack Mottart	Belgium	8:14.8	R

==== Round 1 heat 5 ====
Rank	Rower	Nation	Time	Notes
1	Béla Szendey	Hungary	8:03.2	Q
2	Arnold Schwartz	Denmark	8:06.0	R

==== Round 1 heat 6 ====
Rank	Rower	Nation	Time	Notes
1	Ken Myers	United States	8:14.2	Q
2	Hendrik de Kok	South Africa	8:19.2	R

==== Round 1 heat 7 ====
Rank	Rower	Nation	Time	Notes
1	Josef Straka	Czechoslovakia	8:05.2	Q
2	Kinichiro Ishii	Japan	DNF	E

==== Round 1 heat 8 ====
Rank	Rower	Nation	Time	Notes
1	Michelangelo Bernasconi	Italy	8:02.0	Q

=== First repechage ===
Winners advanced to the second round, but were ineligible for a second repechage if they lost there. Losers were eliminated.

==== First repechage heat 1 ====
Rank	Rower	Nation	Time	Notes
1	Arnold Schwartz	Denmark	8:20.2	Q
2	Walter Flinsch	Germany	8:23.4	E

==== First repechage heat 2 ====
Rank	Rower	Nation	Time	Notes
1	Bert Gunther	Netherlands	8:11.6	Q
2	Jack Mottart	Belgium	8:17.0	E

==== First repechage heat 3 ====
Rank	Rower	Nation	Time	Notes
1	Édouard Candeveau	Switzerland	8:28.6	Q
2	Hendrik de Kok	South Africa	8:50.0	E

=== Round 2 ===
Winners advanced to the third round. Losers competed in the second repechage, if they had advanced by winning in the first round, or were eliminated if they had advanced through the first repechage.

==== Round 2 heat 1 ====
Rank	Rower	Nation	Time	Notes
1	Bert Gunther	Netherlands	8:23.8	Q
2	Béla Szendey	Hungary	8:33.8	R

==== Round 2 heat 2 ====
Rank	Rower	Nation	Time	Notes
1	Josef Straka	Czechoslovakia	8:36.4	Q
2	Joe Wright	Canada	8:45.0	R

==== Round 2 heat 3 ====
Rank	Rower	Nation	Time	Notes
1	Bobby Pearce	Australia	7:28.0	Q
2	Arnold Schwartz	Denmark	7:47.6	E

==== Round 2 heat 4 ====
Rank	Rower	Nation	Time	Notes
1	Ken Myers	United States	7:46.8	Q
2	David Collet	Great Britain	7:56.4	R

==== Round 2 heat 5 ====
Rank	Rower	Nation	Time	Notes
1	Vincent Saurin	France	8:38.2	Q
2	Michelangelo Bernasconi	Italy	9:10.2	R

==== Round 2 heat 6 ====
Rank	Rower	Nation	Time	Notes
1	Édouard Candeveau	Switzerland	9:06.6	Q

=== Second repechage ===
Winners advanced to the third round, while losers were eliminated.

==== Second repechage heat 1 ====
Rank	Rower	Nation	Time	Notes
1	Joe Wright	Canada	7:49.6	Q
2	Michelangelo Bernasconi	Italy	DNF	E

==== Second repechage heat 2 ====
Rank	Rower	Nation	Time	Notes
1	David Collet	Great Britain	7:35.2	Q
2	Béla Szendey	Hungary	7:42.4	E

=== Quarterfinals ===
The competition became single-elimination from this point, with losers being eliminated even if they had not previously had to advance through a repechage.

==== Quarterfinal 1 ====
Rank	Rower	Nation	Time	Notes
1	David Collet	Great Britain	7:52.2	Q
2	Joe Wright	Canada	7:57.6	E

==== Quarterfinal 2 ====
Rank	Rower	Nation	Time	Notes
1	Bert Gunther	Netherlands	7:57.4	Q
2	Josef Straka	Czechoslovakia	8:04.8	E

==== Quarterfinal 3 ====
Rank	Rower	Nation	Time	Notes
1	Ken Myers	United States	8:05.6	Q
2	Édouard Candeveau	Switzerland	8:11.0	E

==== Quarterfinal 4 ====
Rank	Rower	Nation	Time	Notes
1	Bobby Pearce	Australia	7:42.8	Q
2	Vincent Saurin	France	8:11.8	E

=== Semifinals ===
Winners advanced to the gold medal final, with the losers competing for bronze.

==== Semifinal 1 ====
Rank	Rower	Nation	Time	Notes
1	Bobby Pearce	Australia	7:01.8	QA
2	David Collet	Great Britain	7:08.6	QB

==== Semifinal 2 ====
Rank	Rower	Nation	Time	Notes
1	Ken Myers	United States	7:14.2	QA
2	Bert Gunther	Netherlands	7:18.0	QB

=== Finals ===
==== Final B ====
Rank	Rower	Nation	Time
3rd place, bronze medalist(s)	David Collet	Great Britain	7:19.8
4	Bert Gunther	Netherlands	7:31.6

==== Final A ====
Rank	Rower	Nation	Time
1st place, gold medalist(s)	Bobby Pearce	Australia	7:11.0
2nd place, silver medalist(s)	Ken Myers	United States	7:20.8

== Results summary ==
Rank	Rower	Nation	Round 1	First repechage	Round 2	Second repechage	Quarterfinals	Semifinals	Finals
1st place, gold medalist(s)	Bobby Pearce	Australia	7:55.8	Bye	7:28.0	Bye	7:42.8	7:01.8	7:11.0
2nd place, silver medalist(s)	Ken Myers	United States	8:14.2	Bye	7:46.8	Bye	8:05.6	7:14.2	7:20.8
3rd place, bronze medalist(s)	David Collet	Great Britain	8:29.6	Bye	7:56.4	7:35.2	7:52.2	7:08.6	7:19.8
4	Bert Gunther	Netherlands	7:58.4	8:11.6	8:23.8	Bye	7:57.4	7:18.0	7:31.6
5	Joe Wright	Canada	7:57.8	Bye	8:45.0	7:49.6	7:57.6	Did not advance	
5	Josef Straka	Czechoslovakia	8:05.2	Bye	8:36.4	Bye	8:04.8	Did not advance	
5	Édouard Candeveau	Switzerland	8:35.8	8:28.6	9:06.6	Bye	8:11.0	Did not advance	
5	Vincent Saurin	France	8:09.2	Bye	8:38.2	Bye	8:11.8	Did not advance	
9	Béla Szendey	Hungary	8:03.2	Bye	8:33.8	7:42.4	Did not advance		
10	Michelangelo Bernasconi	Italy	8:02.0	Bye	9:10.2	DNF	Did not advance		
11	Arnold Schwartz	Denmark	8:06.0	8:20.2	7:47.6	Did not advance			
12	Jacques Mottard	Belgium	8:14.8	8:17.0	Did not advance				
12	Walter Flinsch	Germany	8:21.8	8:23.4	Did not advance				
12	Hendrik de Kok	South Africa	8:19.2	8:50.0	Did not advance				
15	Kinichiro Ishii	Japan	DNF	Did not advance					
