= Bolzoni =

Bolzoni is an Italian surname. Notable people with it include:

- Adriano Bolzoni (1919–2003), journalist, writer and film director
- Francesco Bolzoni (born 1989), footballer with Rapperswil-Jona in the 2020s
- Giovanni Bolzoni (footballer, born 1905), with Inter Milan in the 1930s
- Nino Bolzoni (1903–1972), rower
