= 1932 European Rowing Championships =

- Venue: Sava
- Location: Belgrade, Yugoslavia
- Dates: 2–4 September 1932

The 1932 European Rowing Championships were rowing championships held on the Sava in the Yugoslav capital city of Belgrade. The competition was only for men and they competed in all seven Olympic boat classes (M1x, M2x, M2-, M2+, M4-, M4+, M8+). It was held from 2 to 4 September.

== Medal summary ==
Event	Gold		Silver		Bronze	
Event	Country & rowers	Time	Country & rowers	Time	Country & rowers	Time
M1x	Italy; Enrico Mariani		France; Vincent Saurin		Czechoslovakia; Jiří Zavřel	
M2x	Hungary; Pál Bóday; István Kauser		Italy; Livio Curto; Ettore Broschi		Poland; Roger Verey; Jerzy Ustupski	
M2-	Switzerland; Max Pfeiffer; Hans Appenzeller		Italy; Rino Galeazzi; Vittorio Lucchini		Belgium; Frans Thissen; León Vergeele	
M2+	Netherlands; W.S. Schmoutziguer; W.A.P. Storm van's Gravensande; C.L. van Woelderen (cox)		Italy; Gustavo Sorge; Angelo Sorge; Livio Armando (cox)		Poland; Henryk Grabowski; Wiktor Szelągowski; Henryk Kawalec (cox)	
M4-	Hungary; László Bartók; Károly Gyurkóczy; László Szabó; Zoltán Török		Italy; Mario Leofler; Giulio Berteletti; Giuseppe Livorno; Giovanni Monteggia		Yugoslavia; Petar Kukoć; Jakov Tironi; Luka Marasović; Bruno Marasović	
M4+	Italy; Valerio Perentin; Francesco Chicco; Nicolò Vittori; Giovanni Delise; Renato Petronio (cox)		Denmark; Aage Hansen; Christian Olsen; Walther Christiansen; Richard Olsen; Poul Richardt (cox)		Czechoslovakia; Václav Barcal; Rudolf Bezděka; Karel Kučera; Josef Straka; Zdeněk Eisner (cox)	
M8+	Yugoslavia; Vjekoslav Rafaeli; Ivo Fabris; Elko Mrduljaš; Juraj Mrduljaš; Petar Kukoć; Jakov Tironi; Luka Marasović; Bruno Marasović; Miro Kraljević (cox)		Hungary; Gusztav Götz; Tibor Machan; Elek Ivacskovics; Kalman Saghy; Alajos Szilassy; Lajos Lafranco; Rezsö Valy; Arpad Kauser; László Molnár (cox)		Czechoslovakia; Jiří Žába; Karel Schuster; Antonín Burda; Karel Novák; Karel Zázvorka; František Vrba; Vladimir Knop; Václav Černý; Josef Jabor (cox)	
