= Fritz Bösch =

Swiss rower

Olympic medal record

Men's rowing

Representing Switzerland
Silver medal – second place	1928 Amsterdam	Coxed four

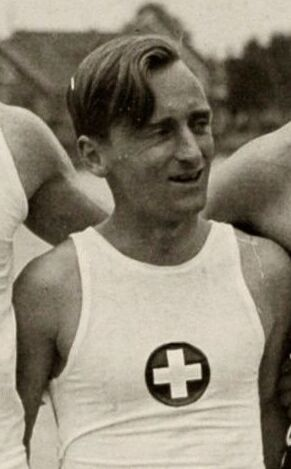
Fritz Bösch in 1928

Fritz Bösch was a Swiss rower who competed in the 1928 Summer Olympics and won the silver medal as member of the Swiss team in Coxed four.
