= Harold Ives =

British rower (1904–1984)

Personal information
- Full name: Harold R. Ives
- Nationality: British
- Born: 16 November 1904
- Died: 23 November 1984 (aged 80)

Sport
- Sport: Rowing

Harold Ives (16 November 1904 – 23 November 1984) was a British rower. He competed in the men's coxed four event at the 1928 Summer Olympics.
