= Isamu Takashima =

Japanese rower

Personal information
- Nationality: Japanese

Sport
- Sport: Rowing

Isamu Takashima was a Japanese rower. He competed in the men's coxed four event at the 1928 Summer Olympics.
