= Giovanni Delise =

Italian rower

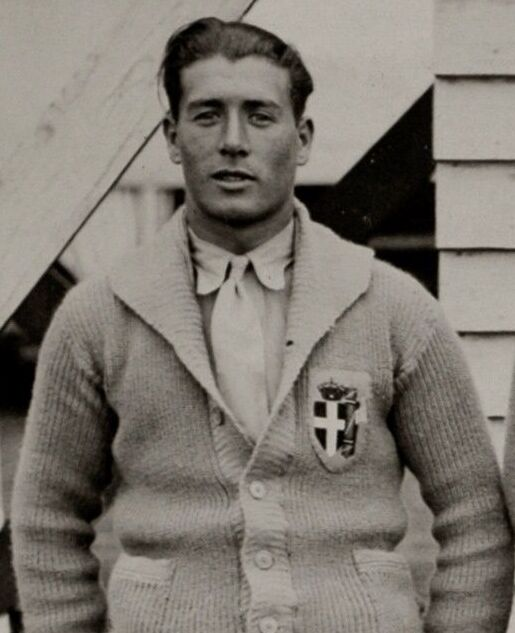
- Giovanni Delise in 1928

Personal information
- Born: 1 November 1907 Izola, Austria-Hungary
- Died: 19 May 1947 (aged 39) Izola, Slovenia

Sport
- Sport: Rowing
- Club: SN Pullino
Medal record
Men's rowing
Representing Italy
Olympic Games
Gold medal – first place	1928 Amsterdam	Coxed four
European Rowing Championships
Gold medal – first place	1929 Bydgoszcz	Coxed four
Gold medal – first place	1932 Belgrade	Coxed four
Gold medal – first place	1934 Lucerne	Coxed four

Giovanni Delise (1 November 1907 – 19 May 1947) was an Italian rower who competed in the 1928 Summer Olympics. In 1928 he won the gold medal as a member of the Italian boat in the coxed four event.
