= Jean Ruffier des Aimés =

French rower

Personal information
- Nationality: French
- Born: 15 April 1902; Paris, France
- Died: 13 April 1976 (aged 73); Nord, France

Sport
- Sport: Rowing

Jean Ruffier des Aimés (15 April 1902 – 13 April 1976) was a French rower. He competed in the men's coxed four event at the 1928 Summer Olympics.
