= 1925 European Rowing Championships =

- Venue: Vltava
- Location: Prague, Czechoslovakia
- Dates: 3–4 September 1925

The 1925 European Rowing Championships were rowing championships held on the Vltava in Prague, Czechoslovakia on 3 and 4 September. The competition was for men only and they competed in all seven Olympic boat classes (M1x, M2x, M2-, M2+, M4-, M4+, M8+) as they had been rowed at the 1924 Summer Olympics in Paris. It was the first time that the coxless four boat class was part of the regatta.

== Medal summary ==
Event	Gold		Silver		Bronze	
Event	Country & rowers	Time	Country & rowers	Time	Country & rowers	Time
M1x	Netherlands; Constant Pieterse		Switzerland; Josef Schneider		Poland; Andrzej Osiecimski-Czapski	
M2x	France; Jean-Pierre Stock; Marc Detton		Switzerland; Rudolf Bosshard; Max Schmid		Czechoslovakia; Josef Straka; Julius Gerhardt	
M2-	Switzerland; Alois Reinhard; Willy Siegenthaler		Netherlands; Jean van Silfhout; Johannes van der Vegte		Czechoslovakia; Antonín Šnábl; Emil Novotný	
M2+	Switzerland; Alois Reinhard; Willy Siegenthaler; Walter Ludin (cox)		France (Note: The source does not list the names of the team members.)		Netherlands; Hein van Suylekom; Carel van Wankum; C. Quispel (cox)	
M4-	Switzerland; Kurt Pfeiffer; Alfred Probst; Hermann Haller; Arthur Dreyfus		Netherlands; Jean van Silfhout; Jacob Brandsma; Johannes van der Vegte; Th. Wennekendonk		Italy; Renato Petruzzelli; Luigi Arciuli; Rolando Gantes; Giuseppe Magaletti	
M4+	Italy; Remigio Genzo; Alberto Privilegi; Mimo Mantegnacco; Elio Grio; Mario Martinelli (cox)		Hungary; Lajos Wick; Sándor Hautzinger; Béla Blum; Zoltán Török; Károly Koch (cox)		Switzerland; Édouard Candeveau; Hans Winzeler; Charles Liechti; Max Pfeiffer; Walter Ludin (cox)	
M8+	Switzerland; Karl Schöchlin; Hans Schöchlin; Moritz Müller; Wilhelm Wippermann; Paul Käser; Charles Holenstein; Julien Comtesse; Hans Rüfenacht; Theophil Mosimann (cox)		Netherlands; J.H. Brommet; Teun Beijnen; Th.P. Tromp; Appel Ooiman; F.M. Joseph; H.P.J. van Ketwich Verschuur; Jan Huges; W.H. van Heerdt; C.J.A. Lummel (cox)		France	
