= James Lawrence (rower) =

American rower

Personal information
- Born: May 30, 1907 Boston, Massachusetts, United States
- Died: January 29, 1995 (aged 87) Brookline, Massachusetts, United States

Sport
- Sport: Rowing

James Lawrence (May 30, 1907 – January 29, 1995) was an American rower. He competed in the men's coxed four event at the 1928 Summer Olympics. He graduated from Harvard University.
