= Charles Van Son =

Belgian rower (1902–1970

Carolus Ludovicus Julius "Charles" Van Son
Personal information
- Nationality: Belgian
- Born: 23 January 1902; Ghent, Belgium
- Died: 22 September 1970 (aged 68); Ghent, Belgium

Sport
- Sport: Rowing

Charles Van Son (23 January 1902 – 22 September 1970) was a Belgian rower. He competed in the men's coxed four event at the 1928 Summer Olympics.
