= Bernard Ormanowski =

Polish rower (1907–1984)

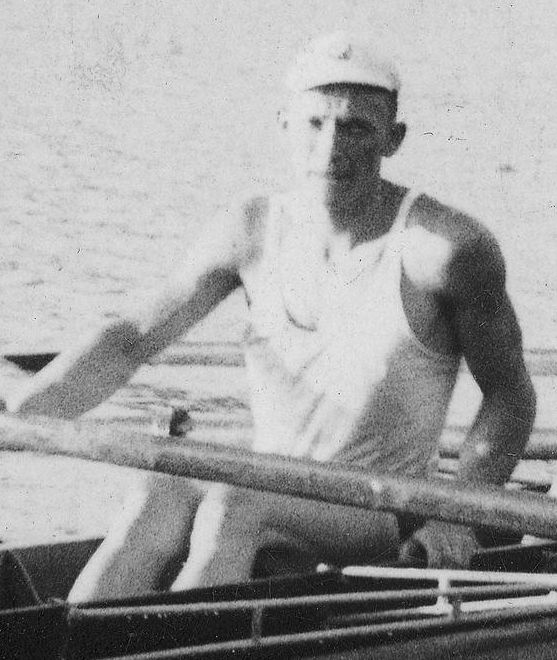
- Ormanowski in 1935

Personal information
- Born: Bernard Paweł Ormanowski; 10 November 1907 Lippink, Schwert
- Died: 7 December 1984 (aged 77) Bydgoszcz
- Height: 174 cm (5 ft 9 in)
- Weight: 68 kg (150 lb)

Sport
- Sport: Rowing
- Club: BTW, Bydgoszcz
Medal record
Men's rowing
Representing Poland
Olympic Games
Bronze medal – third place	1928 Amsterdam	Coxed four

Bernard Paweł Ormanowski (10 November 1907 – 7 December 1984) was a Polish rower who competed in the 1928 Summer Olympics.

He was born in Lippink, Schwert. In 1928 he won the bronze medal as member of the Polish boat in the coxed four event. He died in Bydgoszcz.
