= Joseph Meyer (rower) =

Swiss rower

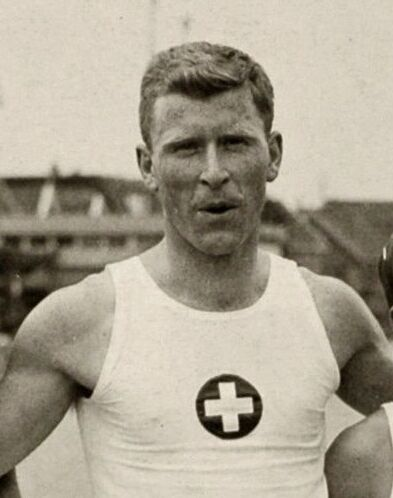
- Meyer at the 1928 Summer Olympics

Personal information
- Nationality: Swiss

Sport
- Country: Switzerland
- Sport: Rowing
- Event: Coxed four

Achievements and titles
- Olympic finals: 1928 Summer Olympics
Medal record
| Silver medal – second place | 1928 Amsterdam | Coxed four |

Joseph Meyer was a Swiss rower who competed in the 1928 Summer Olympics and won the silver medal as member of the Swiss team in coxed four.
