= Émile Gardetto =

Monegasque rower (1907–1980)

Personal information
- Nationality: Monegasque
- Born: 24 April 1907; Monaco
- Died: 25 March 1980 (aged 72); Monaco

Sport
- Sport: Rowing

Émile Marius Gardetto (24 April 1907 – 25 March 1980) was a Monegasque rower. He competed in the men's coxed four event at the 1928 Summer Olympics.
