= Robert Guelpa =

French rower

Personal information
- Nationality: French
- Born: 14 April 1901
- Died: 23 August 1974 (aged 73)

Sport
- Sport: Rowing

Robert Guelpa (14 April 1901 – 23 August 1974) was a French rower. He competed in the men's coxless pair event at the 1928 Summer Olympics.
