= André Pactat =

French rower

Personal information
- Nationality: French

Sport
- Sport: Rowing

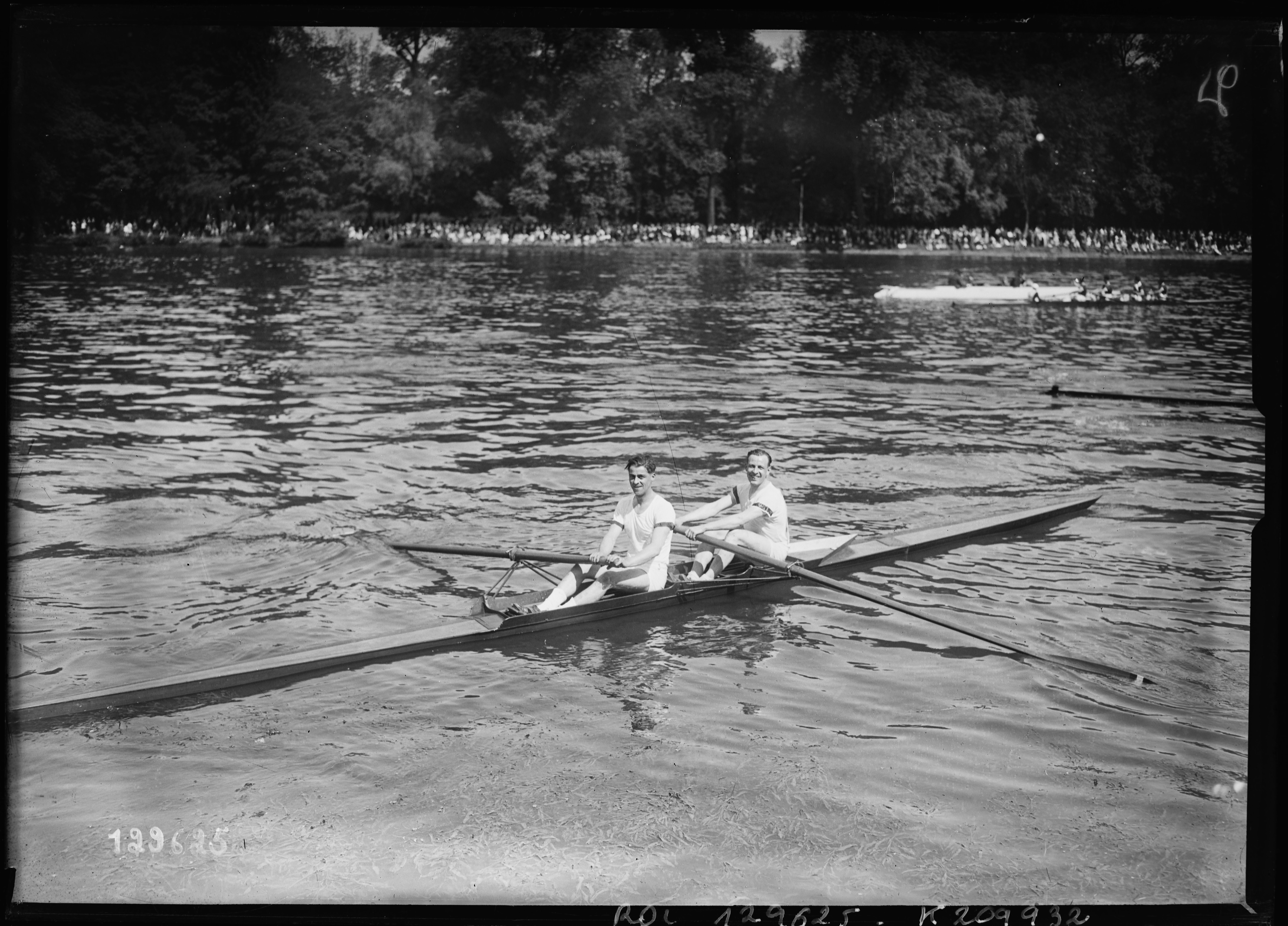
Rowers André Pactat (left) and Robert Guelpa in 1928

André Pactat was a French rower. He competed in the men's coxless pair event at the 1928 Summer Olympics. Pactat is deceased.
