= George Beaumont (rower) =

British rower (1904–1991)

Personal information
- Full name: George William Beaumont
- Nationality: British
- Born: 4 July 1904; Newark-on-Trent, England
- Died: 19 October 1991 (aged 87)

Sport
- Sport: Rowing

George Beaumont (4 July 1904 – 19 October 1991) was a British rower. He competed in the men's coxed four event at the 1928 Summer Olympics.
