= Kurt Moeschter =

German rower (1903–1959)

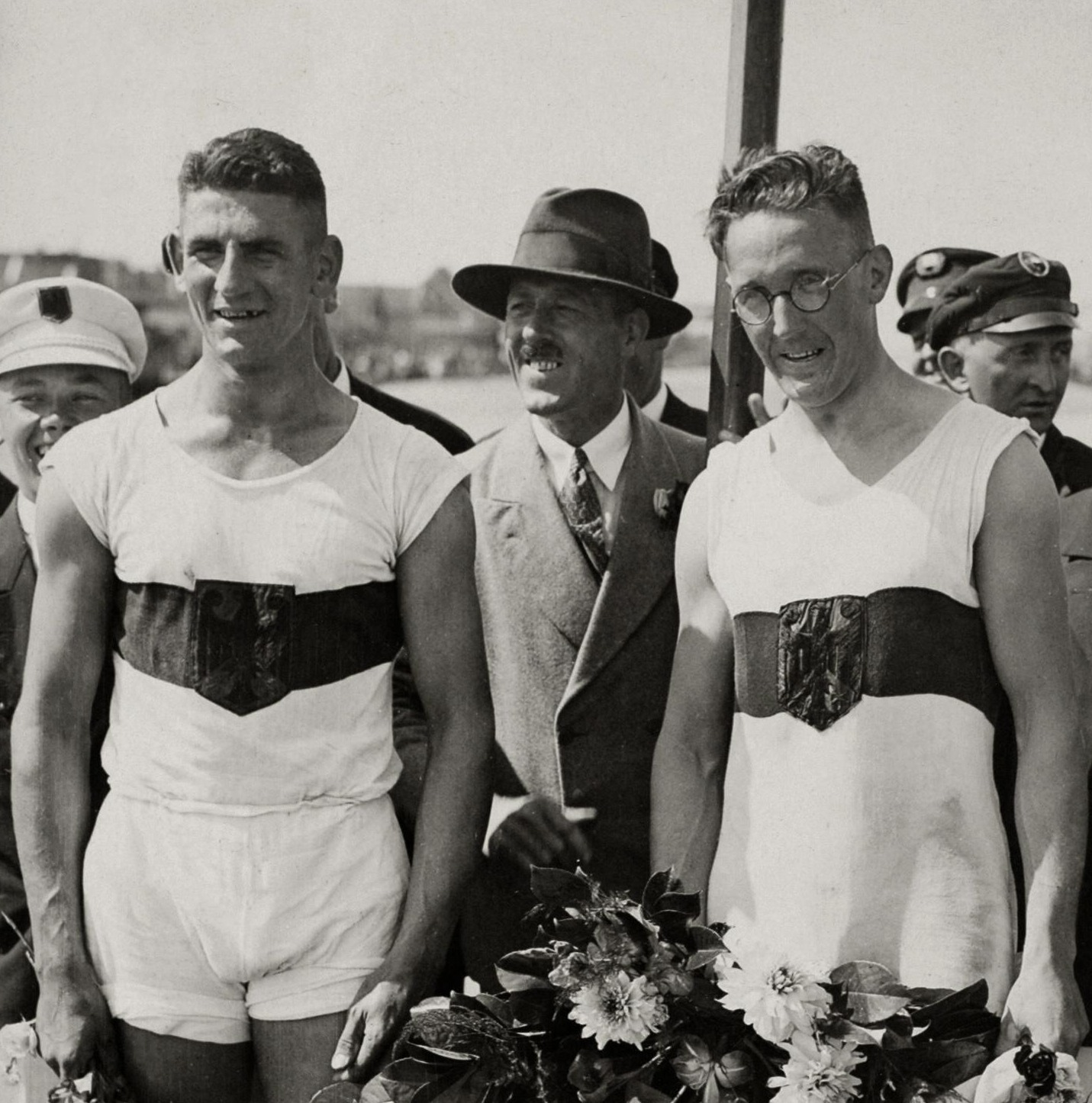
- Kurt Moeschter (left) and Bruno Müller at the 1928 Olympics

Medal record

Men's rowing

Representing Germany

Olympic Games
Gold medal – first place	1928 Amsterdam	Coxless pair

Kurt Moeschter (28 March 1903 – 26 June 1959) was a German rower who won a gold medal in the coxless pairs at the 1928 Summer Olympics, together with Bruno Müller.
