= James Hubbard (rower) =

American rower

Personal information
- Nationality: American
- Born: December 7, 1906 Germantown, Pennsylvania, United States
- Died: May 21, 1960 (aged 53) Hartland, Vermont, United States

Sport
- Sport: Rowing

James Hubbard (December 7, 1906 – May 21, 1960) was an American rower. He competed in the men's coxed four event at the 1928 Summer Olympics. He graduated from Harvard University and Union Theological Seminary.
