= Béla Zoltán (rower) =

Hungarian rower (1901– 1982)

Personal information
- Nationality: Hungarian
- Born: 17 December 1901; Cluj-Napoca, Kingdom of Romania
- Died: 1982 (aged 80–81); Budapest, Hungary

Sport
- Sport: Rowing

Béla Zoltán (17 December 1901 – 1982) was a Hungarian rower. He competed in the men's coxed four event at the 1928 Summer Olympics.
