= Alfred Krohn =

German rower

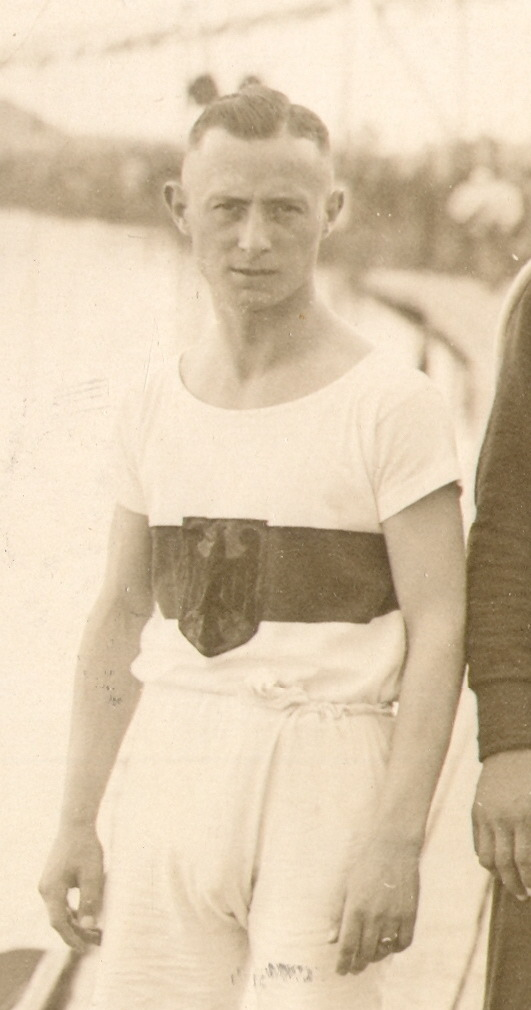
- Alfred Krohn at the 1928 Summer Olympics

Personal information
- Nationality: German
- Born: 2 May 1903 Szczecin, Poland
- Died: 18 April 1968 (aged 64)

Sport
- Sport: Rowing

Alfred Krohn (2 May 1903 – 18 April 1968) was a German rower. He competed in the men's coxed four event at the 1928 Summer Olympics.
