= Charles Gardetto =

Monegasque rower (1904–1989)

Personal information
- Nationality: Monegasque
- Born: 18 February 1904; Monaco
- Died: 24 March 1989 (aged 85); Monaco

Sport
- Sport: Rowing

Charles Paul Gardetto (18 February 1904 – 24 March 1989) was a Monegasque rower. He competed in the men's coxed four event at the 1928 Summer Olympics.
