= Roelof Hommema =

Dutch rower

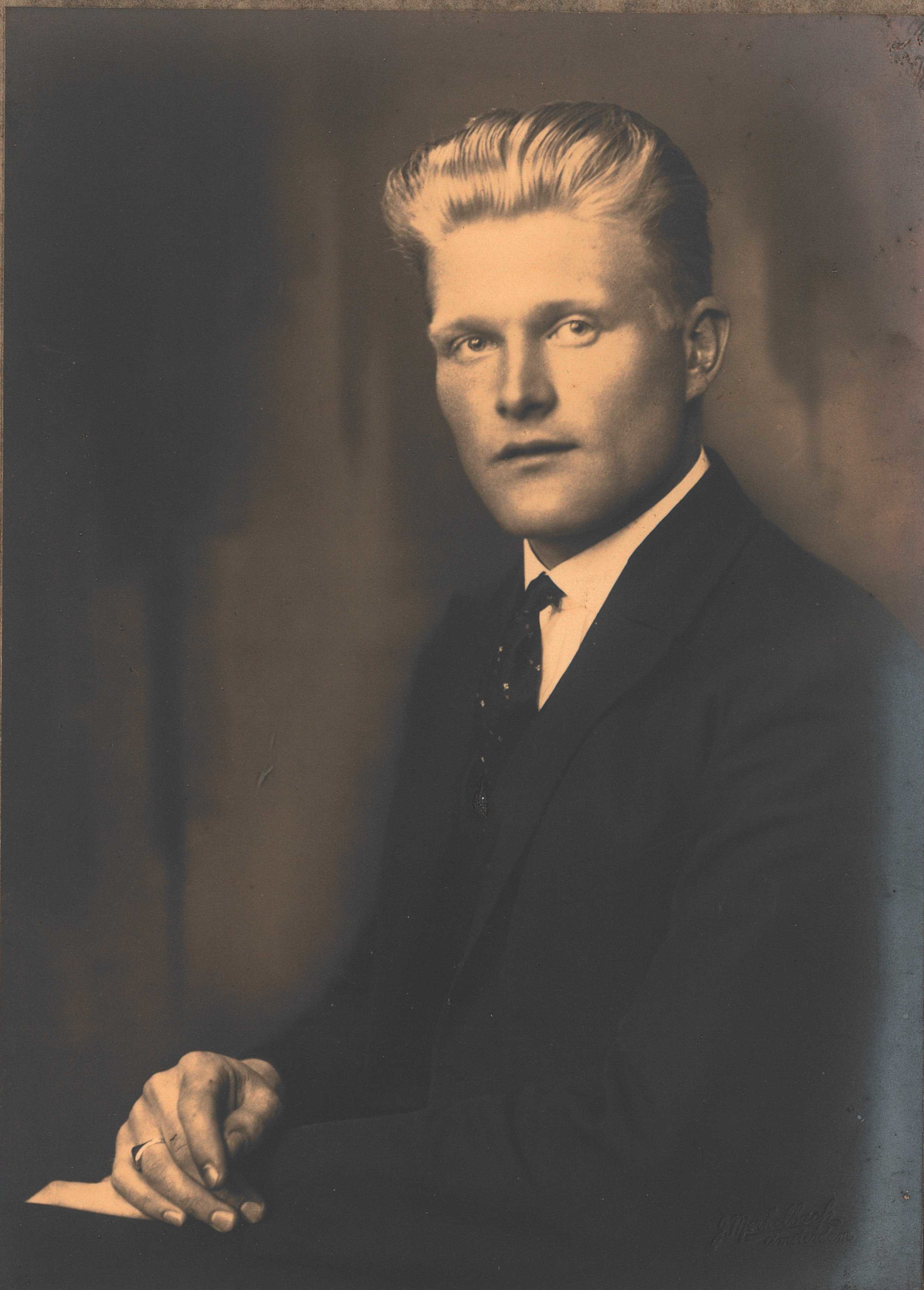
- Roelof Hommema, photo Jacob Merkelbach

Personal information
- Born: 3 October 1904 Lekkum, Netherlands
- Died: 27 August 1956 (aged 51) Amsterdam, Netherlands

Sport
- Sport: Rowing
- Club: Nereus, Amsterdam
Medal record
Men's rowing
Representing the Netherlands
European Rowing Championships
Gold medal – first place	1924 Zürich	Eight
Silver medal – second place	1926 Lucerne	Coxless four

Roelof Hommema (3 October 1904 – 27 August 1956) was a Dutch rower. He competed at the 1924 Summer Olympics in Paris with the men's eight where they were eliminated in round one.
