= Eugene Belisle =

American rower and businessman (1910–1983)

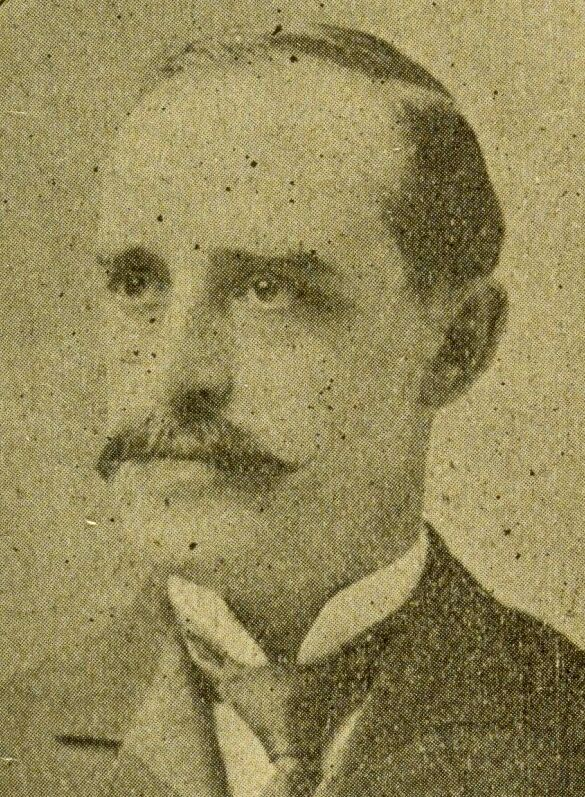
Eugène-Louis Bélisle

Eugene Louis Belisle (January 13, 1910 – June 10, 1983) was Executive Director of the Hartford Development Corporation from 1965 through 1975. Belisle spearheaded economic development efforts for the city of Hartford, Connecticut and oversaw a renaissance of the northeast city in the early 1970s.

Belisle was the son of Hector Belisle and M. Grace Potter of Fall River, Massachusetts. Belisle married Ruth Macloon, daughter of producer Louis Macloon and classmate at Harvard's sister institution Radcliffe College, in 1938. The Belisle family has seven children.

A 1931 graduate of Harvard University, as coxswain of the Harvard Crew, he represented the United States at the 1928 Summer Olympics in Amsterdam. His team was eliminated in the second round of the coxed four event.
