= André Decours =

French rower

Personal information
- Nationality: French
- Born: 15 November 1902
- Died: 20 June 1972 (aged 69)

Sport
- Sport: Rowing

André Decours (15 November 1902 – 20 June 1972) was a French rower. He competed in the men's coxed four event at the 1928 Summer Olympics.
