= Arnold Schwartz =

Danish rower (1901–1975)

Personal information
- Born: Arnold Bernhard Schwartz; 11 March 1901 Sakskøbing, Denmark
- Died: 24 December 1975 (aged 74) Maribo, Denmark

Sport
- Sport: Rowing
Medal record
Men's rowing
Representing Denmark
European Rowing Championships
Bronze medal – third place	1930 Liège	Single sculls

Arnold Bernhard Schwartz (11 March 1901 – 24 December 1975) was a Danish rower. He competed at the 1928 Summer Olympics in Amsterdam with the men's single sculls where he was eliminated in round two.
