= Paul McDowell (rower) =

American rower

Personal information
- Born: January 17, 1905
- Died: August 14, 1962 (aged 57)

Sport
- Sport: Rowing
Medal record
Men's rowing
Representing the United States
Olympic Games
Bronze medal – third place	1928 Amsterdam	Coxless pair

Paul L. McDowell (January 17, 1905 – August 14, 1962) was an American rower who competed in the 1928 Summer Olympics.

In 1928 he won the bronze medal with his partner John Schmitt in the coxless pairs competition.
