= Wiktor Szelągowski =

Polish rower

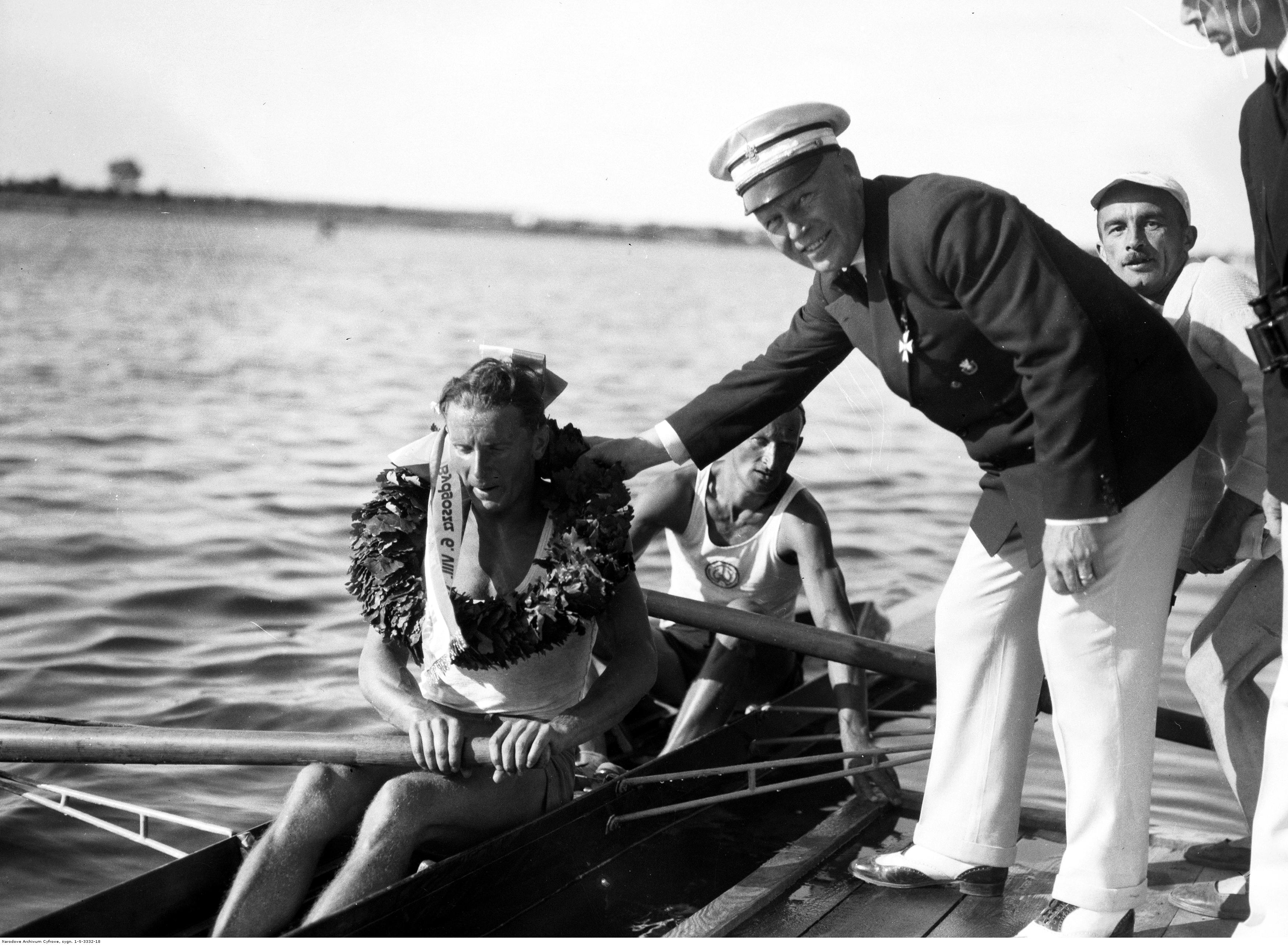
- Grabowski and Szelągowski after winning the Polish nationals in 1933

Personal information
- Born: 1900 Włocławek, Poland
- Died: 1935 (aged 34–35) Poland

Sport
- Sport: Rowing
- Club: Włocławek Rowing Association
Medal record
Men's rowing
Representing Poland
European Rowing Championships
Bronze medal – third place	1929 Bydgoszcz	Coxed pair
Bronze medal – third place	1932 Belgrade	Coxed pair

Wiktor Szelągowski (1900–1935) was a Polish rower.

Szelągowski attended gymnasium in Włocławek. Shortly after graduating he joined the army for the Polish–Soviet War. He was injured and was a prisoner of war for several months. After his recovery, he again followed his passion for sport and joined the Włocławek Rowing Association. He competed at a national level from 1925. For five continuous years from 1929 he was Polish national champion in the coxed pair with Henryk Grabowski as his rowing partner. He was also national vice-champion with Grabowski in the coxless pair. Szelągowski and Grabowski won two European bronze medals, first at the 1929 European Rowing Championships in Bydgoszcz, Poland (with Gaworski as cox), and then at the 1932 European Rowing Championships in Belgrade, Yugoslavia (with Henryk Kawalec as cox).

Szelągowski retired from competitive rowing in 1933 due to declining health. He completed training at the Józef Piłsudski University of Physical Education in Warsaw as a rowing trainer. He died from long term effects of his war injuries in 1935 before he could commence as a rowing trainer. Szelągowski is buried at the municipal cemetery in Włocławek.
