= Ken Myers (rower) =

American rower (1896–1972)

Medal record

Men's rowing

Representing the United States

Olympic Games
Gold medal – first place	1932 Los Angeles	Double sculls
Silver medal – second place	1920 Antwerp	Coxed four
Silver medal – second place	1928 Amsterdam	Single sculls

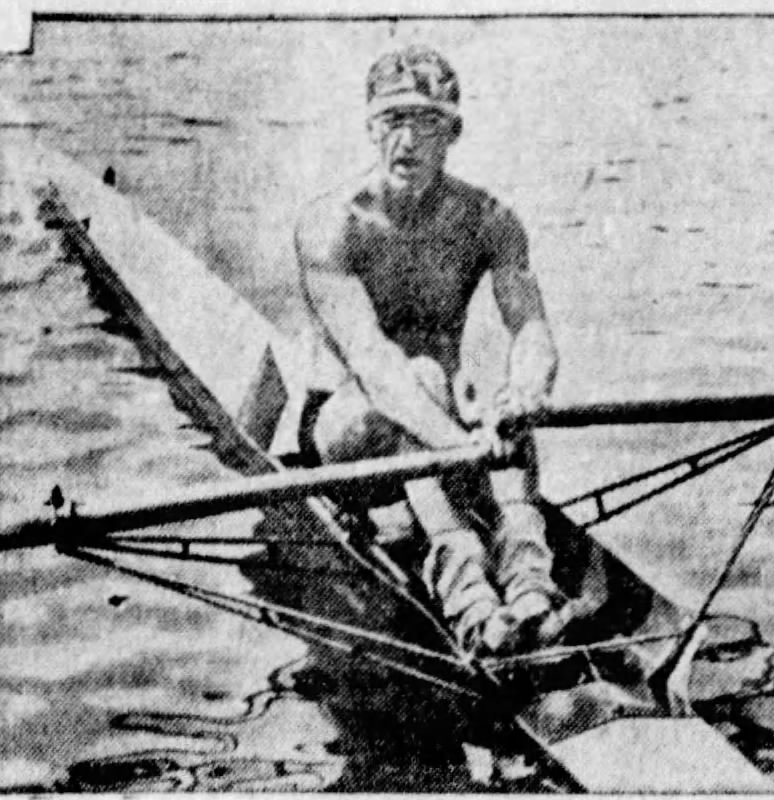
Myers in his shell in 1928

Kenneth Myers (August 10, 1896 – September 22, 1972) was an American rower who competed in the 1920 Summer Olympics, in the 1928 Summer Olympics, and in the 1932 Summer Olympics.

In 1920, he was part of the American boat, which won the silver medal in the coxed fours event. Eight years later, he won his second silver medal, this time in the single sculls competition. In 1932, he won the gold medal with his partner William Gilmore in the double sculls event.
