= Jack Mottart =

Belgian rower

Personal information
- Full name: Eugène Mottart
- Nationality: Belgian
- Born: 29 January 1900; Huy
- Died: 1953 (aged 52–53); Liège

Sport
- Sport: Rowing

Eugène (Jack) Mottart (29 February 1900 – 1953) was a Belgian rower. He competed in the men's single sculls event at the 1928 Summer Olympics.
