= Terence O'Brien (rower) =

British rower

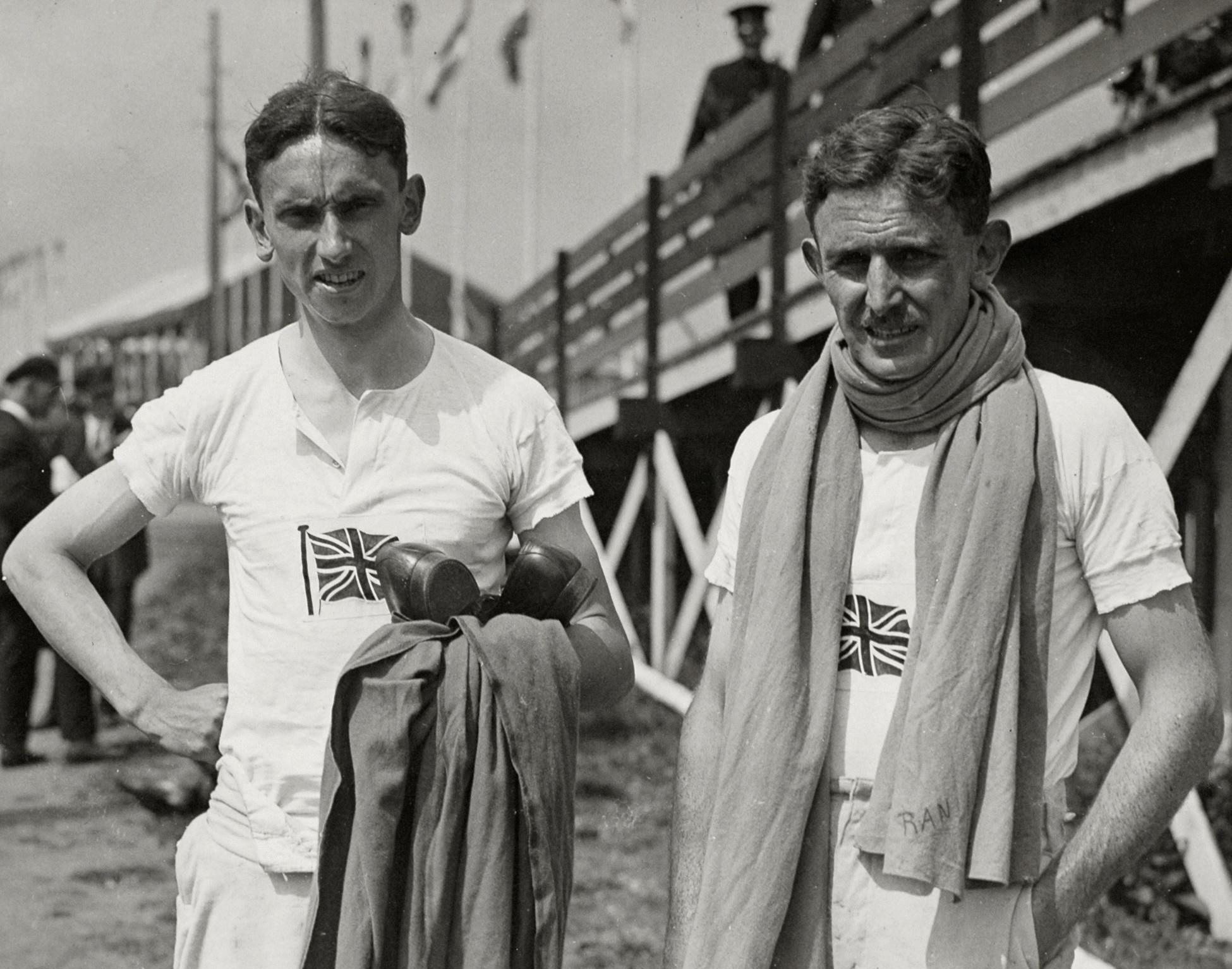
- O'Brien (left) and Nisbet at the 1928 Olympics

Personal information
- Nationality: British (English)
- Born: 23 December 1906 Thanet
- Died: 19 December 1982 (aged 75) Sutton, England

Sport
- Sport: Rowing
- Event: Eights
- Club: London RC
Medal record
Men's rowing
Representing Great Britain
Olympic Games
Silver medal – second place	1928 Amsterdam	Coxless pair
Representing England
British Empire Games
Gold medal – first place	1930 Hamilton	Eight

Terence Noel O'Brien (23 December 1906 – 19 December 1982) was an English rower, who competed for Great Britain in the 1928 Summer Olympics.

== Biography ==
O'Brien was born in Thanet and was a member of London Rowing Club. In 1927, partnering Robert Nisbet, he won the Silver Goblets at Henley Royal Regatta.

In 1928 the pair were chosen to compete in the coxless pairs for Great Britain rowing at the 1928 Summer Olympics, where they won the silver medal.

He competed for the 1930 English team in the eights event at the 1930 British Empire Games in Hamilton, Ontario, Canada and won the gold medal.
