= 1929 European Rowing Championships =

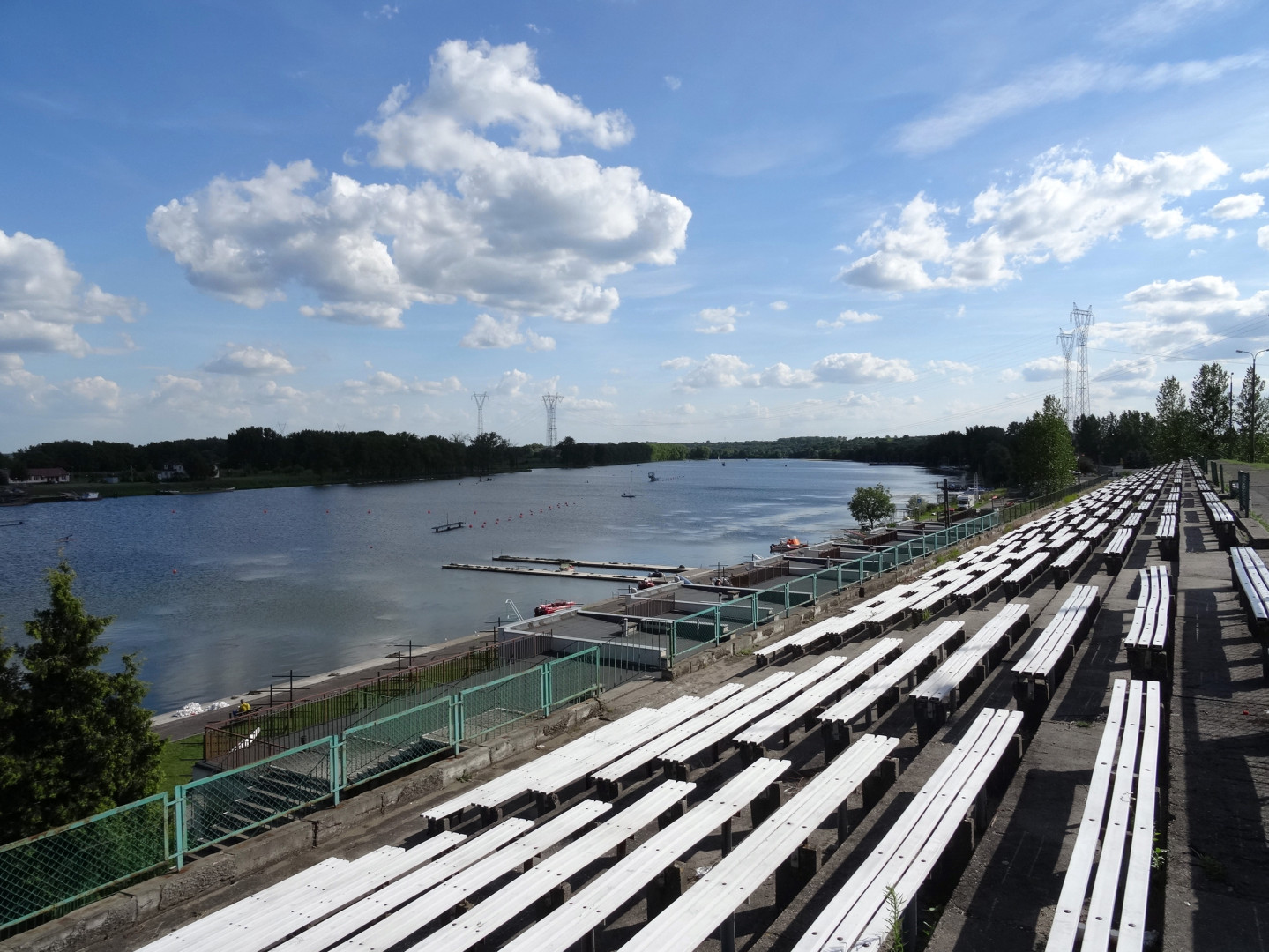
- 1929 European Rowing Championships venue in 2015
- Venue: Bydgoszcz Regatta Course
- Location: Bydgoszcz, Poland
- Dates: August

The 1929 European Rowing Championships were rowing championships held on the Bydgoszcz Regatta Course in the Polish city of Bydgoszcz in the suburb of Łęgnowo. The competition was for men only and they competed in all seven Olympic boat classes (M1x, M2x, M2-, M2+, M4-, M4+, M8+).

== Medal summary ==
Event	Gold		Silver		Bronze	
Event	Country & rowers	Time	Country & rowers	Time	Country & rowers	Time
M1x	Netherlands; Bert Gunther		Czechoslovakia; Josef Straka		Belgium; Achille Mengé	
M2x	Switzerland; Édouard Candeveau; Ernest Schnezler		Italy; Michelangelo Bernasconi; Alessandro de Col		Belgium; Carlos Van den Driessche; Louis Strauwen	
M2-	Italy; Romeo Sisti; Nino Bolzoni		Poland; Henryk Budziński; Jan Mikołajczak		Belgium; Havaux; Soltermans	
M2+	Italy; Renzo Vestrini; Pier Luigi Vestrini; Cesare Milani (cox)		France ?		Poland; Wiktor Szelągowski; Henryk Grabowski; Tadeusz Gaworski (cox)	
M4-	Italy; Cesare Rossi; Pietro Freschi; Umberto Bonadè; Paolo Gennari		Netherlands; J.D. Ferman; J. Stenger; G.N. de Laive; J.B. Bosscher		Poland; Jerzy Braun; Leon Birkholc; Edmund Jankowski; Franciszek Bronikowski	
M4+	Italy; Valerio Perentin; Giliante D'Este; Nicolò Vittori; Giovanni Delise; Renato Petronio (cox)		Denmark; Aage Hansen; Christian Olsen; Walther Christiansen; Richard Olsen; Poul Richardt (cox)		Switzerland; Edouard Schädeli; Paul Wachtel; René Bühler; Willy Müller; Georges Steiner (cox)	
M8+	Italy; Vittorio Cioni; Enrico Garzelli; Guglielmo Del Bimbo; Roberto Vestrini; Dino Barsotti; Eugenio Nenci; Mario Balleri; Renato Barbieri; Cesare Milani (cox)		Yugoslavia; Dragi Glavinović; Joszip Gattin; Emilijo Brainović; Petar Kukoč; Misce Ljubić; Joszip Mrklić; Andra Žeželj; Duško Žeželj; Kamilo Roic (cox)		Poland; Stefan Jurkowski; Witalis Leporowski; Zygmunt Kasprzak; Władysław Tuliszka; Mieczysław Tuliszka; Zbigniew Kasprzak; Marian Ziętkiewicz; Antoni Moschalewicz; Boleslaw Zimny (cox)	
