= Jean Bauwens =

Belgian coxswain

Personal information
- Born: Jean H. G. Bauwens; 12 February 1892
- Died: 31 May 1975 (aged 83)

Sport
- Sport: Rowing
- Club: KRSG, Gent
Medal record
Men's rowing
Representing Belgium
European Rowing Championships
| Bronze medal – third place | 1926 Lucerne | Eight |

Jean H. G. Bauwens (12 February 1892 – 31 May 1975) was a Belgian rower. He competed at the 1928 Summer Olympics in Amsterdam with the men's coxed four where they were eliminated in the quarter-final.
