= Appel Ooiman =

Dutch rower

Personal information
- Born: Albert Ooiman; 7 August 1905 Leeuwarden, Netherlands
- Died: 6 June 1971 (aged 65) Lutry, Switzerland

Sport
- Sport: Rowing
- Club: Laga, Delft
Medal record
Men's rowing
Representing the Netherlands
European Rowing Championships
Silver medal – second place	1925 Prague	Eight
Gold medal – first place	1926 Lucerne	Eight

Albert "Appel" Ooiman (7 August 1905 – 6 June 1971) was a Dutch rower. He competed at the 1928 Summer Olympics in Amsterdam with the men's eight where they were eliminated in round two.
