= Otto Bucher =

Swiss rower

Olympic medal record

Men's rowing
Silver medal – second place	1928 Amsterdam	Coxed four

Otto Bucher (born 29 October 1901, date of death unknown) was a Swiss rower who competed in the 1928 Summer Olympics and won the silver medal as member of the Swiss team in coxed four.
