= László Bartók =

Hungarian rower (1904–1945)

Personal information
- Born: 1904 Budapest, Hungary
- Died: 8 April 1945 (aged 40–41) Buchenwald concentration camp

Sport
- Sport: Rowing
- Club: Pannónia Evezős Egylet
Medal record
Men's rowing
Representing Hungary
European Rowing Championships
Bronze medal – third place	1931 Paris	Eight
Gold medal – first place	1932 Belgrade	Coxless four
Bronze medal – third place	1933 Budapest	Coxless four

László Bartók (1904 – 8 April 1945) was a Hungarian rower. He competed in the Paris 1924 Olympics in the coxed eight and the coxed four. He also competed at the 1928 Summer Olympics in Amsterdam with the coxed four where they were eliminated in the round two repechage. After retiring from competition, Bartók worked as a trainer at the Danube Rowing Association of Budapest.

László Bartók was the oldest son of a large Hungarian family. His father was Bernat Bela Bartók (a bank director) and his mother was Joland Schweiger (a pianist). He had two sisters and two brothers (Maria, Lucy, Stephen, and Denis). He was fluent in Hungarian, German, English, and Italian. László was married and had three children.

He was murdered during the Holocaust at Buchenwald on 8 April 1945. The camp was liberated three days later. The fate of his wife and three children remains unknown.
