= Francesco Chicco =

Italian rower

Sport
- Sport: Rowing
Medal record
Men's rowing
Representing Italy
European Rowing Championships
Silver medal – second place	1930 Liège	Coxed four
Gold medal – first place	1932 Belgrade	Coxed four
Gold medal – first place	1933 Budapest	Coxed four
Gold medal – first place	1934 Lucerne	Coxed four

Francesco Chicco was an Italian rower who competed in the 1930s. From 1932 to 1934, he was three times European champion in the coxed four event.
