= Ernst Haas (rower) =

Swiss rower

Personal information
- Born: 27 July 1908

Sport
- Sport: Rowing
- Club: RC Reuss Luzern
Medal record
Men's rowing
Representing Switzerland
Olympic Games
Silver medal – second place	1928 Amsterdam	Coxed four
European Rowing Championships
Silver medal – second place	1927 Como	Eight

Ernst Haas (born 27 July 1908) was a Swiss rower who competed in the 1928 Summer Olympics and won the silver medal as member of the Swiss team in coxed four.
