= Léon le Cornu =

French rower (1905–1977)

Léon Clément le Cornu
Personal information
- Nationality: French
- Born: 15 October 1905; Asnières-sur-Seine, France
- Died: 5 November 1977 (aged 72); Suresnes, France

Sport
- Sport: Rowing

Léon le Cornu (15 October 1905 – 5 November 1977) was a French rower. He competed in the men's coxed four event at the 1928 Summer Olympics.
