= Kazuo Nose =

Japanese rower

Personal information
- Nationality: Japanese

Sport
- Sport: Rowing

Kazuo Nose was a Japanese rower. He competed in the men's coxed four event at the 1928 Summer Olympics. Nose is deceased.
