= Leslie Potter (rower) =

British rower

Personal information
- Nationality: British
- Born: 23 October 1907
- Died: 13 May 1971 (aged 63)

Sport
- Sport: Rowing

Leslie Potter (23 October 1907 – 13 May 1971) was a British rower. He competed in the men's coxed four event at the 1928 Summer Olympics.
