= John Schmitt (rower) =

American rower (1901–1991)

Olympic medal record

Men's rowing
Bronze medal – third place	1928 Amsterdam	coxless pair

John Victor Schmitt (December 23, 1901 – June 13, 1991) was an American rower who competed in the 1928 Summer Olympics.

In 1928 he won the bronze medal with his partner Paul McDowell in the coxless pairs competition.
