= Allerton Cushman =

American rower (1907–2006)

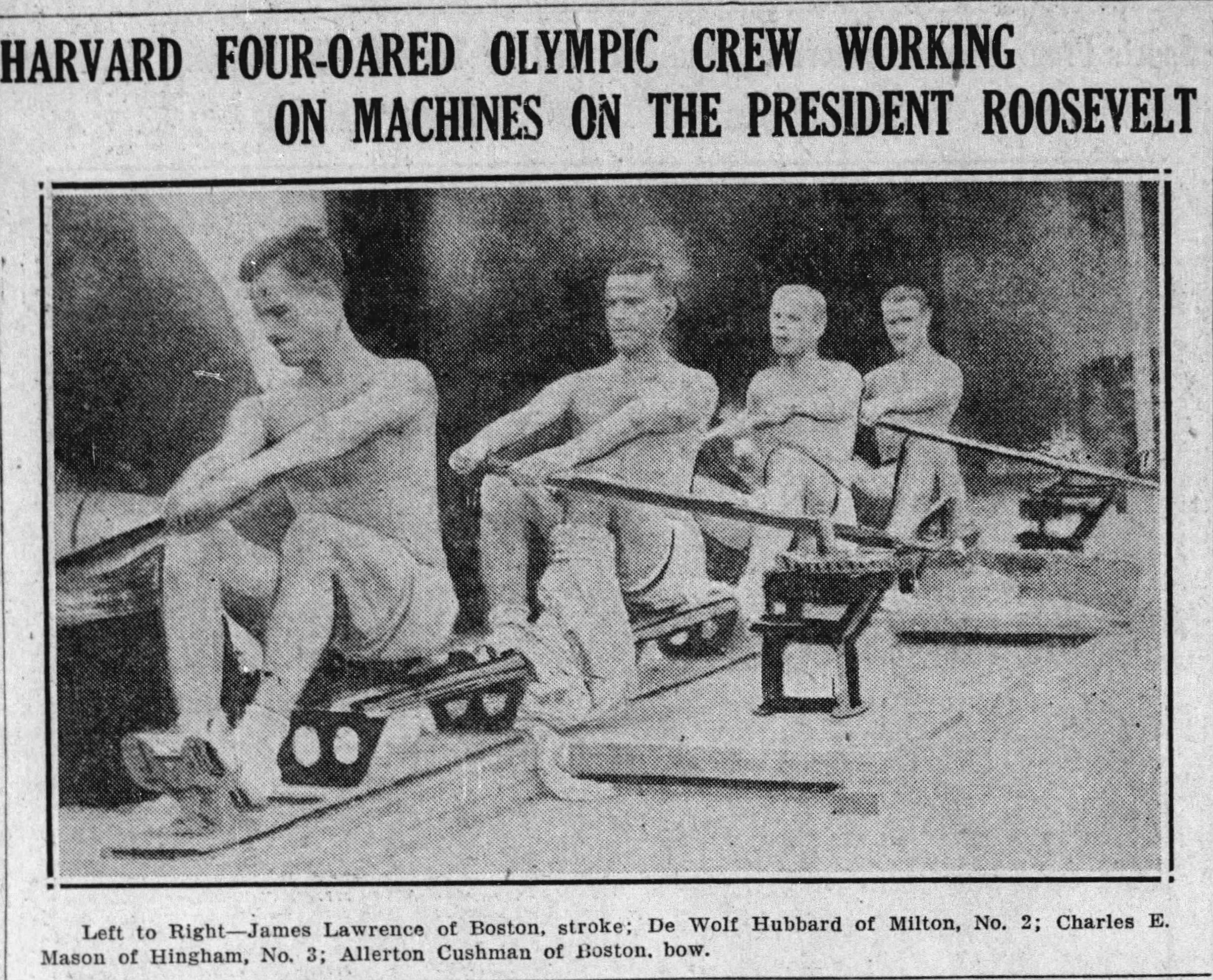
- Allerton Cushman (far right) in 1928

Personal information
- Born: July 27, 1907 Fort Ethan Allen, Vermont, United States
- Died: October 25, 2006 (aged 99) Scottsdale, Arizona, United States

Sport
- Sport: Rowing

Allerton Cushman (July 27, 1907 – October 25, 2006) was an American rower. He competed in the men's coxed four event at the 1928 Summer Olympics. He graduated from Harvard University.
