= Béla Blum =

Hungarian rower

Personal information
- Born: 30 June 1891 Budapest, Hungary
- Died: 6 November 1957 (aged 66)

Sport
- Sport: Rowing
- Club: Pannónia Evezős Egylet
Medal record
Men's rowing
Representing Hungary
European Rowing Championships
Silver medal – second place	1925 Prague	Coxed four
Bronze medal – third place	1931 Paris	Eight

Béla Blum (30 June 1891 – 6 November 1957) was a Hungarian rower. He competed at the 1928 Summer Olympics in Amsterdam with the men's coxed four where they were eliminated in the round two repechage.
