= 1926 European Rowing Championships =

- Venue: Lake Lucerne
- Location: Lucerne, Switzerland
- Dates: ?–6 September 1926

The 1926 European Rowing Championships were rowing championships held on Lake Lucerne in the Swiss city of Lucerne. The competition was for men only and they competed in all seven Olympic boat classes (M1x, M2x, M2-, M2+, M4-, M4+, M8+).

== Competition ==
The regatta was held on Lake Lucerne; the 1908 European Rowing Championships had also been held there. From 1933 onwards, the nearby Rotsee was used for regattas instead. The final race day in 1926 was Monday, 6 September. The Italian eight was from Canottieri Bucintoro in Venice.

== Medal summary ==
| Event | Gold | | Silver | | Bronze | |
|---|---|---|---|---|---|---|
| Event | Country & rowers | Time | Country & rowers | Time | Country & rowers | Time |
| M1x | Switzerland; Josef Schneider | | Hungary; Béla Szendey | | Belgium; Fernand Vintens | |
| M2x | Switzerland; Rudolf Bosshard; Maurice Rieder | | Italy; Michelangelo Bernasconi; Alessandro de Col | | Belgium; Edmond Van Parys; Adolphe Schnaphauf | |
| M2- | Switzerland; Alois Reinhard; Willy Siegenthaler | | Italy; Jean Cipollina; Massimo Ballestrero (Note: This is likely to be wrong as Ballestrero is listed as a coxswain in several sources.) | | Netherlands; Hein van Suylekom; Carel van Wankum | |
| M2+ | Switzerland; Edouard Schädeli; Willy Müller; Fernand Eggenschwyler (cox) | | Italy; Pier Luigi Vestrini; Renzo Vestrini; Cesare Milani (cox) | | Netherlands; J.H.A. Langen van den Valk; H.S. de Vries; Tjong (cox) | |
| M4- | Switzerland; Alois Reinhard; Otto Bühlmann; Kaspar Zimmermann; Willy Siegenthaler | | Netherlands; B.C.M. van Ogtrop; Roelof Hommema; Egbertus Waller; P.A. Kroesen | | Portugal; Mario Fernandez Garcia; Francisco Westwoad Leotte; Jose Augusto Cardoso Leitas; Samuel de Moraes Sarmento Martino | |
| M4+ | Italy; Antonio Ghiardello; Mario Ghiardello; Giovanni-Battista Pastine; Andrea Ghiardello; Ugo Giangrande (cox) | | Switzerland; Karl Schöchlin; Hans Schöchlin; Paul Käser; Wilhelm Wippermann; Theophil Mosimann (cox) | | Poland; Franciszek Bronikowski; Leon Birkholc; Mieczyslaw Figurski; Franciszek Janik; Franciszek Brzesinski (cox) | |
| M8+ | Netherlands; Hans Kruyt; Teun Beijnen; F.M. Joseph; Appel Ooiman; A. van Asgum; J.B. Bosscher; Tjallie James; K.J. Stigter; M.O. Davis (cox) | | Italy; Vincenzo Fabiano; Francesco Fabiano; Angelo Olgeni; Gildo Foco; Terenzio Catullo; Giuseppe Camuffo; Aldo Olgeni; Aldo Bettini; Gino Bettini (cox) | +0.3 sec | Belgium; Robert Swartelé; Maurice Swartelé; Theo Wambeke; Alphonse De Wette; J. Van Parys; Hippolyte Schouppe; C. De Jonghe; Jean Bauwens; G. Nachez (cox) | |
