= Kinichiro Ishii =

Japanese rower

Personal information
- Nationality: Japanese

Sport
- Sport: Rowing

Kinichiro Ishii was a Japanese rower. He competed in the men's single sculls event at the 1928 Summer Olympics. Ishii is deceased.
