= Bruno Müller (rower) =

German rower

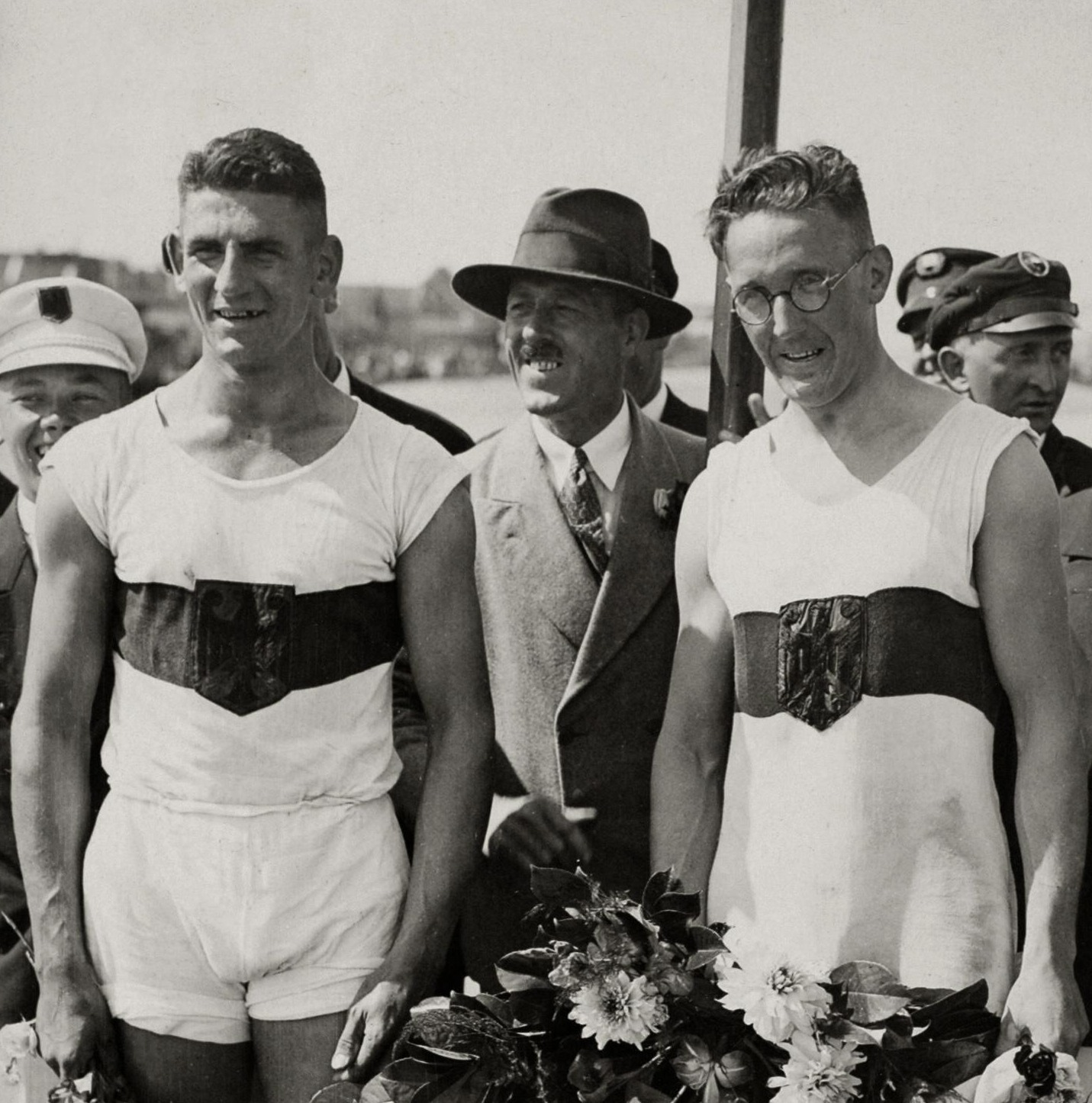
- Kurt Moeschter and Bruno Müller (right) at the 1928 Olympics

Medal record

Men's rowing

Representing Germany

Olympic Games
Gold medal – first place	1928 Amsterdam	Coxless pair

Bruno Müller (11 October 1902 – 8 June 1975) was a German rower who won a gold medal in the coxless pairs at the 1928 Summer Olympics, together with Kurt Moeschter.
