= Tsukasa Sonobe =

Japanese rower

Personal information
- Nationality: Japanese

Sport
- Sport: Rowing

Tsukasa Sonobe was a Japanese rower. He competed in the men's coxed four event at the 1928 Summer Olympics. Sonobe is deceased.
