= Robert Nisbet (rower) =

British rower

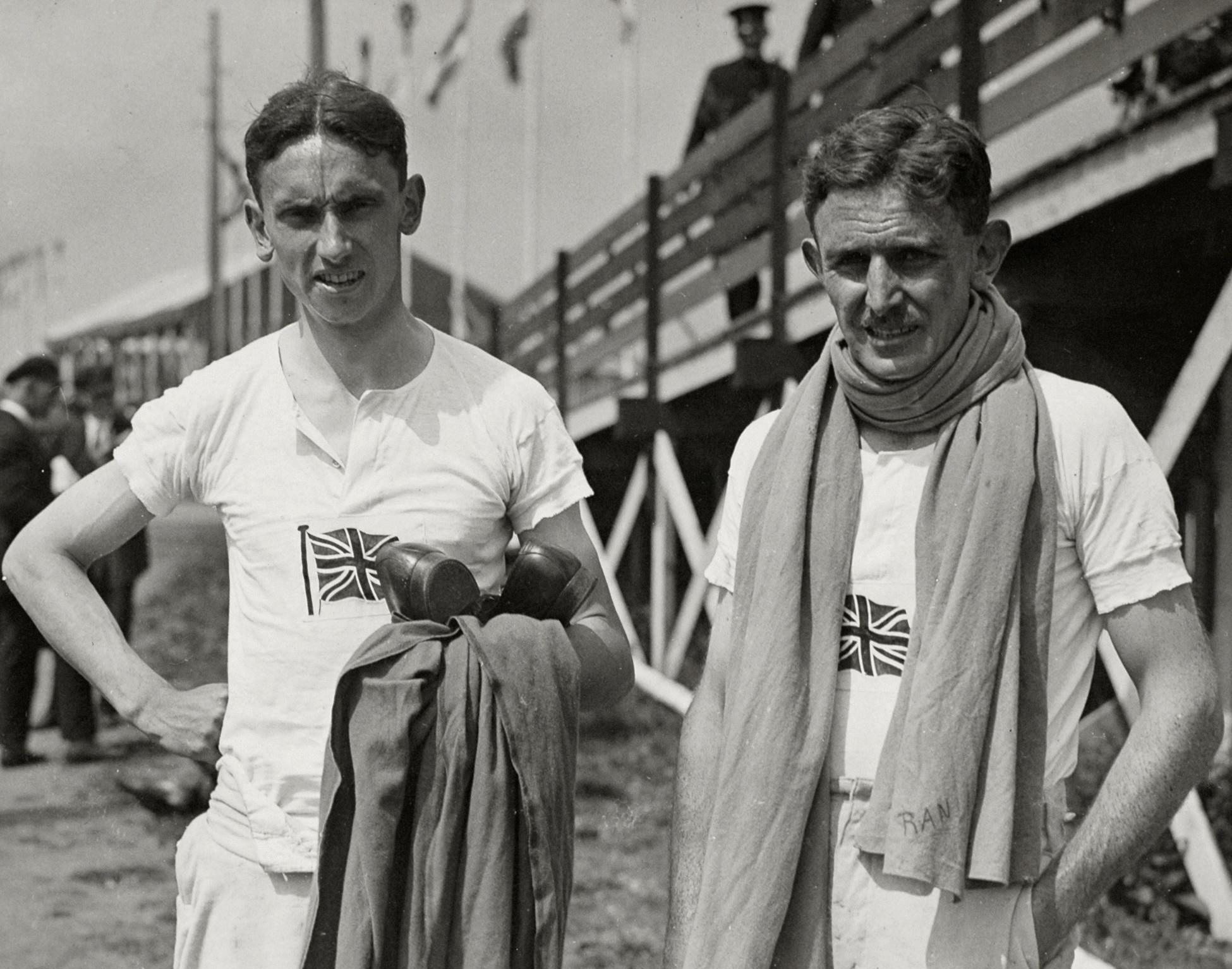
- O'Brien and Nisbet (right) at the 1928 Olympics

Medal record

Men's rowing

Representing Great Britain

Olympic Games
Silver medal – second place	1928 Amsterdam	Coxless pair

Robert Archibald Nisbet (23 November 1900 – 13 September 1986), known as Archie Nisbet, was a British rower, born in Kensington, who competed in the 1928 Summer Olympics.

Nisbet was a member of London Rowing Club. In 1927, partnering Terence O'Brien, he won Silver Goblets at Henley Royal Regatta. In 1928 the pair were chosen to compete in the coxless pairs for Great Britain rowing at the 1928 Summer Olympics, where they won the silver medal.
