= Nicolò Vittori =

Italian rower

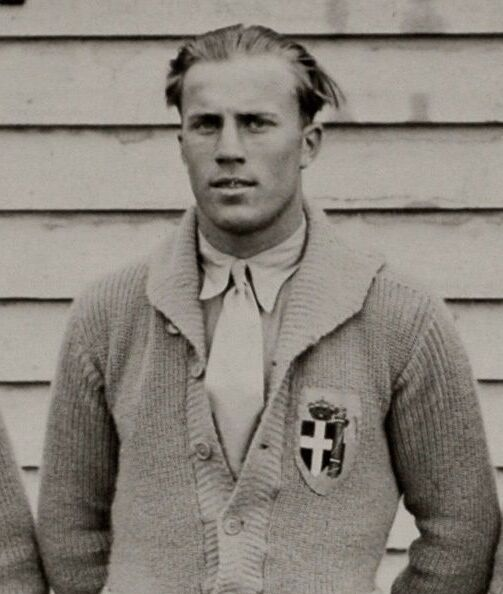
- Vittori in 1928

Personal information
- Born: 12 March 1909 Izola, Austria-Hungary
- Died: 26 May 1988 (aged 79) Trieste, Italy

Sport
- Sport: Rowing
- Club: SN Pullino
Medal record
Men's rowing
Representing Italy
Olympic Games
Gold medal – first place	1928 Amsterdam	Coxed four
European Rowing Championships
Gold medal – first place	1929 Bydgoszcz	Coxed four
Silver medal – second place	1930 Liège	Coxed four
Gold medal – first place	1932 Belgrade	Coxed four
Gold medal – first place	1933 Budapest	Coxed four
Gold medal – first place	1934 Lucerne	Coxed four
Bronze medal – third place	1935 Berlin	Coxed four

Nicolò Vittori (12 March 1909 – 26 May 1988) was an Italian rower who competed in the 1928 Summer Olympics and in the 1936 Summer Olympics.

Vittori was born in Izola in 1909, which at that time belonged to Austria-Hungary. After WWI, the town was part of Italy and Vittori represented that country. In 1928 he won the gold medal as a member of the Italian boat in the coxed four event. Eight years later he was part of the Italian boat which was eliminated in the repêchage of the coxed four competition.
