= Charles Mason (rower) =

American rower

Personal information
- Born: October 5, 1908 Boston, Massachusetts, United States
- Died: November 6, 1999 (aged 91) Westwood, Massachusetts, United States

Sport
- Sport: Rowing

Charles Mason (October 5, 1908-November 6, 1999) was an American rower. He competed in the men's coxed four event at the 1928 Summer Olympics. He graduated from Harvard University.
