= Maurice Delplanck =

Belgian rower

Personal information
- Nationality: Belgian
- Born: 1 November 1907
- Died: 29 September 1996 (aged 88)

Sport
- Sport: Rowing

Maurice Delplanck (1 November 1907 – 29 September 1996) was a Belgian rower. He competed in the men's coxed four event at the 1928 Summer Olympics.
