= Franciszek Bronikowski =

Polish rower (1907–1964)

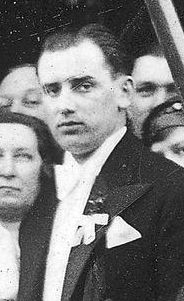
- Bronikowski in 1932

Personal information
- Born: Franciszek Jan Bronikowski; 25 February 1907 Bromberg, Province of Posen
- Died: 1 December 1964 (aged 57) Milanówek, Poland
- Relatives: Adam Bronikowski (grandson)

Sport
- Sport: Rowing
- Club: BTW, Bydgoszcz
Medal record
Men's rowing
Representing Poland
Olympic Games
Bronze medal – third place	1928 Amsterdam	Coxed four
European Rowing Championships
Bronze medal – third place	1926 Lucerne	Coxed four
Bronze medal – third place	1929 Bydgoszcz	Coxless four

Franciszek Jan Bronikowski (25 February 1907 – 1 December 1964) was a Polish rower who competed in the 1928 Summer Olympics.

In 1928 he won the bronze medal as member of the Polish boat in the coxed four event.

He was born in Bromberg, Province of Posen and died in Milanówek. Adam Bronikowski is his grandson.
