= Valerio Perentin =

Italian rower

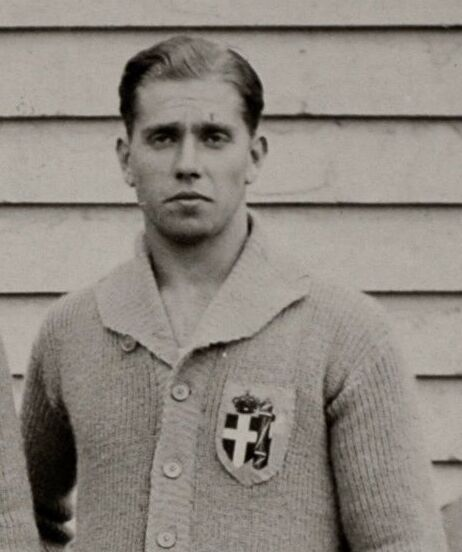
- Valerio Perentin in 1928

Personal information
- Born: 12 July 1909 Izola, Austria-Hungary
- Died: 7 January 1998 (aged 88) Naples, Italy

Sport
- Sport: Rowing
- Club: SN Pullino
Medal record
Men's rowing
Representing Italy
Olympic Games
Gold medal – first place	1928 Amsterdam	Coxed four
European Rowing Championships
Gold medal – first place	1929 Bydgoszcz	Coxed four
Silver medal – second place	1930 Liège	Coxed four
Gold medal – first place	1932 Belgrade	Coxed four
Gold medal – first place	1933 Budapest	Coxed four
Gold medal – first place	1934 Lucerne	Coxed four

Valerio Perentin (12 July 1909 in Izola, Austria-Hungary – 7 January 1998) was an Italian rower who competed in the 1928 Summer Olympics and in the 1936 Summer Olympics.

In 1928 he won the gold medal as member of the Italian boat in the coxed four event. Eight years later he was part of the Italian boat which was eliminated in the repechage of the coxed four competition.
