= Pierre Levesy =

Monegasque rower (1909–1983)

Personal information
- Nationality: Monegasque
- Born: 17 March 1909
- Died: 10 October 1983 (aged 74)

Sport
- Sport: Rowing

Pierre Levesy (17 March 1909 – 10 October 1983) was a Monegasque rower. He competed in the men's coxed four event at the 1928 Summer Olympics.
