= Bert Gunther =

Dutch rower (1899–1968)

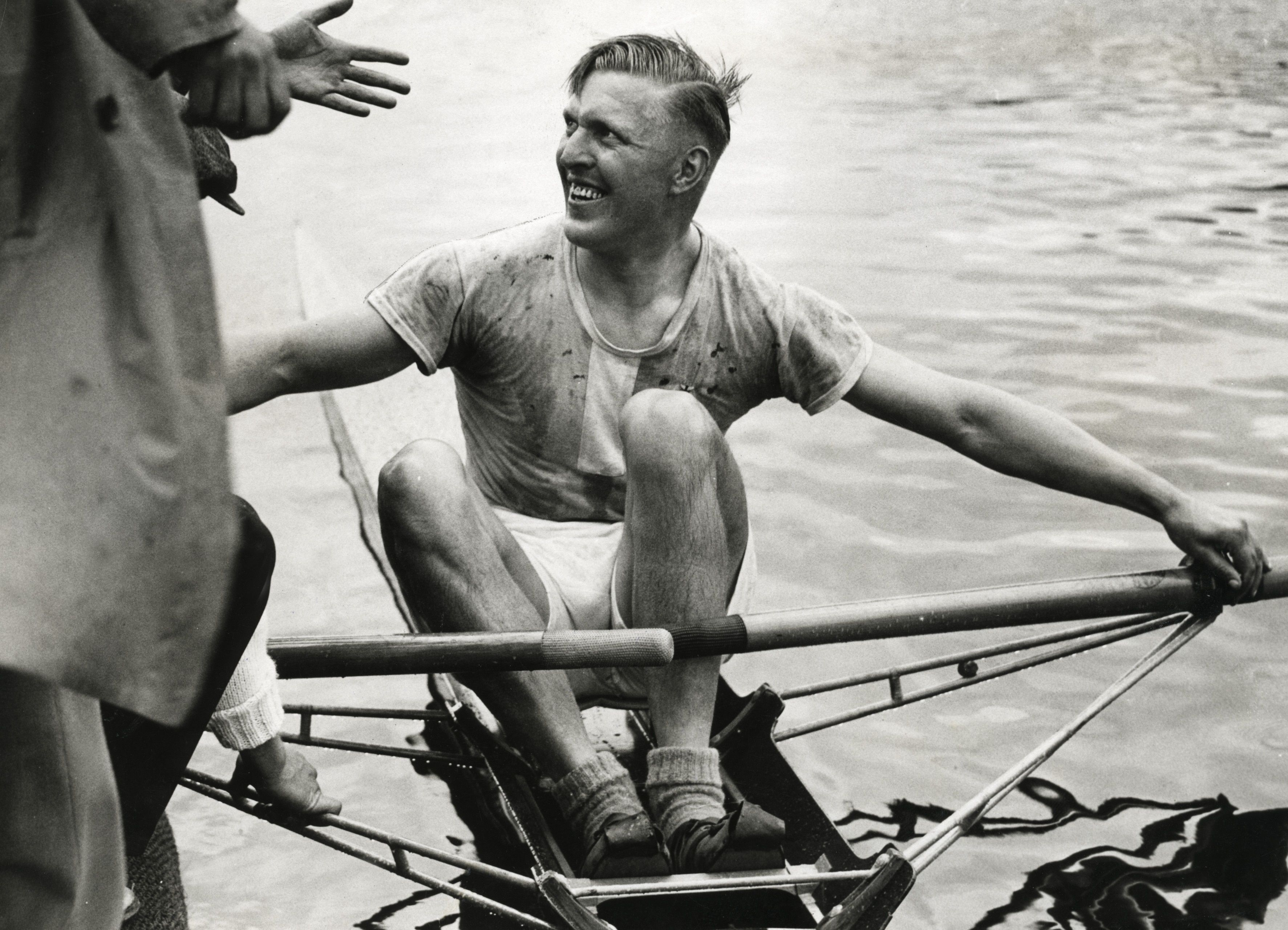

Personal information
- Born: Lambertus Hendrik Frederik Gunther; 10 December 1899 Amsterdam, Netherlands
- Died: 14 October 1968 (aged 68) Arnhem, Netherlands

Sport
- Sport: Rowing
Medal record
Men's rowing
Representing the Netherlands
European Rowing Championships
Silver medal – second place	1923 Como	Single sculls
Silver medal – second place	1923 Como	Double sculls
Gold medal – first place	1929 Bydgoszcz	Single sculls

Lambertus Hendrik Frederik Gunther (10 December 1899 – 14 October 1968) was a Dutch rower. He competed at the 1928 Summer Olympics in Amsterdam with the men's single sculls where he came fourth.

In 1929, Gunther won the Diamond Challenge Sculls (the premier singles sculls event) at the Henley Royal Regatta, rowing for the De Amstel club.
