= Aiko Satō (writer) =

Japanese writer (1923–2026)

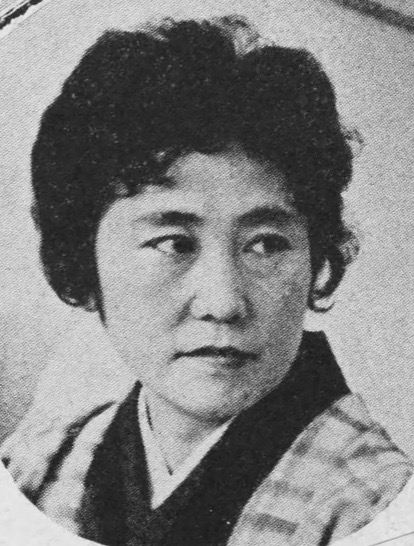
- Aiko Satō in 1964
- Born: 5 November 1923
- Died: 29 April 2026 (aged 102)
- Education: Kōnan Higher Girls' School
- Occupation: Author

Aiko Satō (佐藤 愛子, Satō Aiko; 5 November 1923 – 29 April 2026) was a Japanese writer.

== Early life and education ==
The writer Aiko Satō was born in Osaka in 1923. She was the second child and only daughter of the novelist Kōroku Satō, the younger agnate half-sister of poet Hachiro Sato, and the elder agnate half-sister of the playwright Hachirō Satō.

Satō graduated from Kōnan Higher Girls' School (the precursor to the modern Konan Girls' Junior and Senior High School).

== Works ==
Satō published early works in the magazine Bungei Shuto (文芸首都). She wrote an autobiographical novel, Aiko (愛子, 1959), which she followed eight years later with a biography of her father entitled Hana wa Kurenai (花はくれない, "The Flowers Are Red", 1967) (Note: Also titled Hana wa Kurenai: Shōsetsu Satō Kōryoku (花は紅―小説佐藤紅緑, "The Flowers Are Red: A Novel on Satō Kōryoku").) and seven years after that with a book about her mother, Joyū Mariko (女優万里子, "The Actress Mariko", 1974).

Her works Sokuratesu no Tsuma (ソクラテスの妻, "Socrates' Wife") and Futari no Onna (二人の女, "Two Women"), both published in 1963, earned a nomination for the Akutagawa Prize, and Kanō Taii Fujin (加納大尉婦人, published 1964) was nominated for the Naoki Prize. She won the 61st Naoki Prize for Tatakai-sunde Hi ga Kurete (闘いすんで日が暮れて), which portrays a woman's struggles with her incapable husband.

== Death ==
Satō died on 29 April 2026, at the age of 102.
