= Renato Petronio =

Italian rower

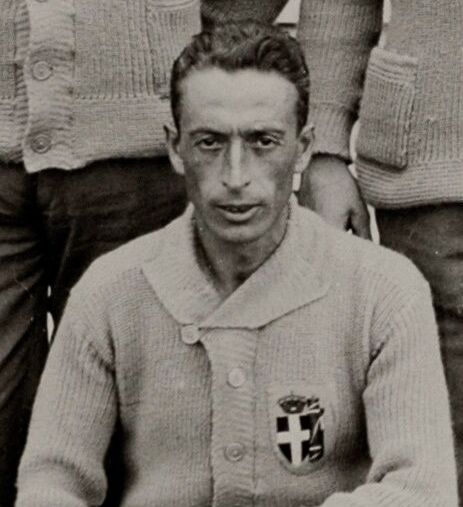
- Renato Petronio in 1928

Personal information
- Born: 5 February 1891 Piran, Austro-Hungarian Empire
- Died: 9 April 1976 (aged 85) Portogruaro, Italy

Sport
- Sport: Rowing
- Club: SN Pullino
Medal record
Men's rowing
Representing Italy
Olympic Games
Gold medal – first place	1928 Amsterdam	Coxed four
European Rowing Championships
Gold medal – first place	1929 Bydgoszcz	Coxed four
Silver medal – second place	1930 Liège	Coxed four
Gold medal – first place	1932 Belgrade	Coxed four
Gold medal – first place	1933 Budapest	Coxed four
Gold medal – first place	1934 Lucerne	Coxed four

Renato Petronio (5 February 1891 – 9 April 1976) was an Italian rowing coxswain who competed in the 1928 Summer Olympics and in the 1936 Summer Olympics.

In 1928, he won the gold medal as cox of the Italian boat in the coxed four event. Eight years later he was the coxswain of the Italian boat which was eliminated in the repechage of the coxed four competition.
