= Leon Birkholc =

Polish rower (1904–1968)

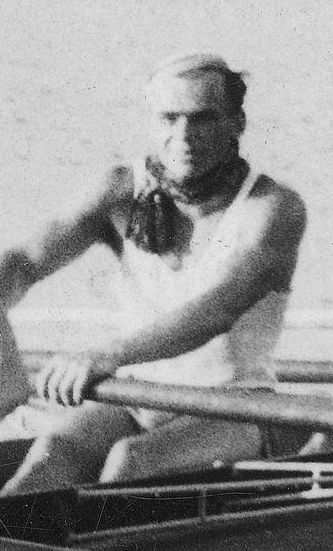
- Birkholc in 1935

Personal information
- Born: Leszek Leon Birkholc; 16 April 1904 Crone an der Brahe, Kreis Bromberg
- Died: 26 April 1968 (aged 64) Kłodzko, Poland

Sport
- Sport: Rowing
- Club: BTW, Bydgoszcz
Medal record
Men's rowing
Representing Poland
Olympic Games
| Bronze medal – third place | 1928 Amsterdam | Coxed four |
European Rowing Championships
| Bronze medal – third place | 1926 Lucerne | Coxed four |
| Bronze medal – third place | 1929 Bydgoszcz | Coxless four |

Leszek Leon Birkholc (16 April 1904 – 26 April 1968) was a Polish rower who competed in the 1928 Summer Olympics.

In 1928 he won the bronze medal as member of the Polish boat in the coxed four event.

He was born in Crone an der Brahe, Kreis Bromberg and died in Kłodzko.
