= Hendrik de Kok =

South African rower

Personal information
- Nationality: South African
- Born: 20 March 1902; Winburg, Orange River Colony
- Died: 24 May 1993 (aged 91); Johannesburg, South Africa

Sport
- Sport: Rowing

Hendrik de Kok (20 March 1902 – 24 May 1993) was a South African rower. He competed in the men's single sculls event at the 1928 Summer Olympics.
