= Paul Käser =

Swiss rower

Personal information
- Born: 8 August 1904
- Died: unknown

Sport
- Sport: Rowing
- Club: Seeclub Biel
Medal record
Men's rowing
Representing Switzerland
European Rowing Championships
Silver medal – second place	1923 Como	Eight
Gold medal – first place	1925 Prague	Eight
Silver medal – second place	1926 Lucerne	Coxed four
Silver medal – second place	1927 Como	Coxed four
Silver medal – second place	1930 Liège	Coxless four
Bronze medal – third place	1931 Paris	Coxed four

Paul Käser (8 August 1904 – ?) was a Swiss rower active in the 1920s and 1930s.

Käser was born in 1904 and rowed for Seeclub Biel in the Swiss city of Biel/Bienne. He won his first European medal at the 1923 European Rowing Championships in Como where the Swiss men's eight came second. At the 1925 European Rowing Championships in Prague he became European champion with the men's eight. At the 1926 European Rowing Championships in Lucerne he won a silver medal with the coxed four. With one rower having been replaced, the team again won silver at the 1927 European Rowing Championships in Como. At the 1930 European Rowing Championships in Liège, Käser won a silver medal with the coxless four. For the 1931 European Rowing Championships in Paris, was back in the coxed four where they won bronze. He always had the brothers Karl and Hans Schöchlin as fellow rowers when he won European medals.

After his competitive career, Käser was a coach at his rowing club for several decades.
