= Willy Müller =

Swiss rower

Personal information
- Born: Wilhelm Müller

Sport
- Sport: Rowing
Medal record
Men's rowing
Representing Switzerland
European Rowing Championships
Silver medal – second place	1924 Zürich	Coxed pair
Gold medal – first place	1926 Lucerne	Coxed pair
Silver medal – second place	1927 Como	Coxed pair
Bronze medal – third place	1929 Bydgoszcz	Coxed four
Gold medal – first place	1931 Paris	Coxless four

Wilhelm Müller was a Swiss rower. He competed at the 1928 Summer Olympics in Amsterdam with the men's coxless pair where they were eliminated in the quarter-final.
