= Swornegacie =

- Village
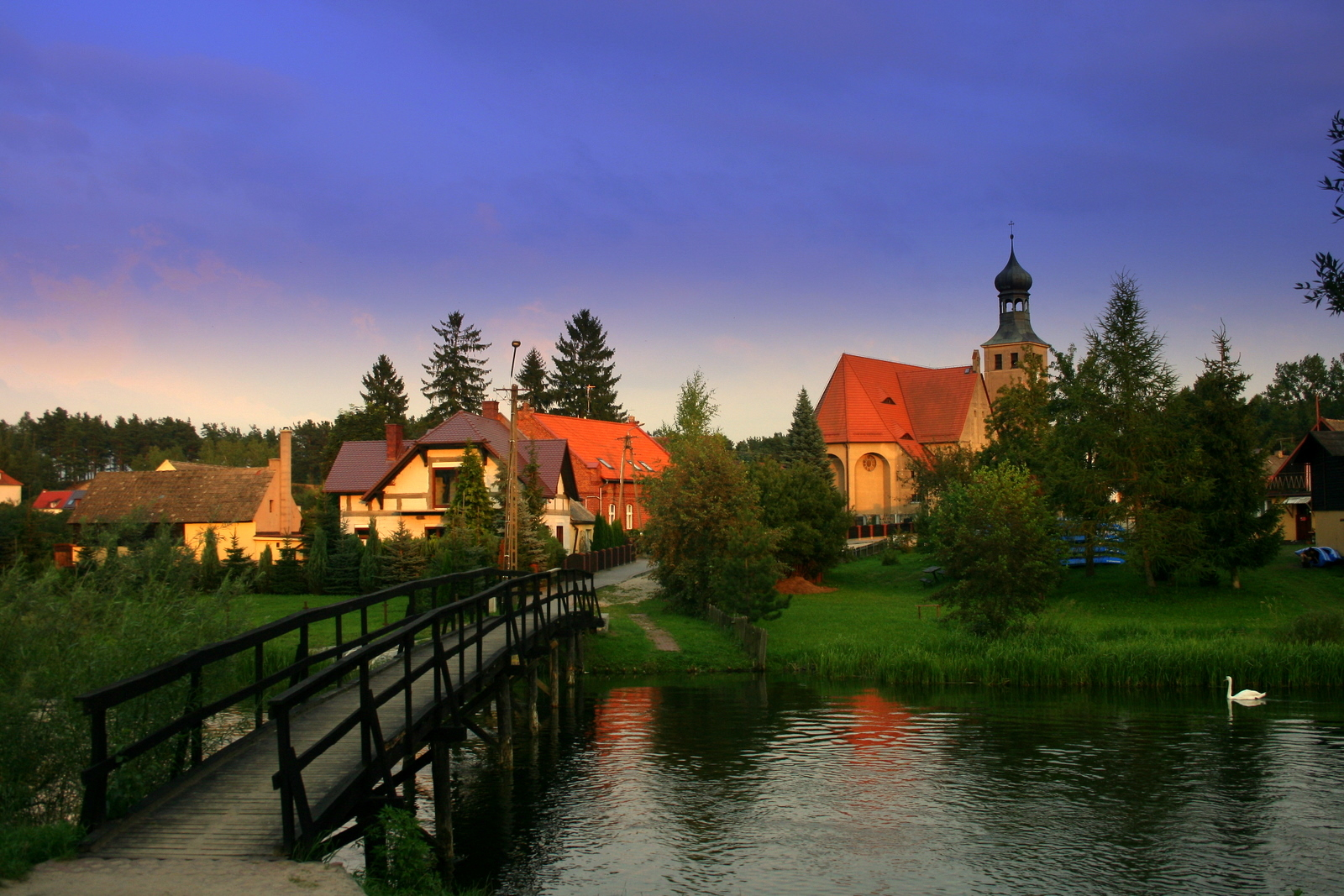
- View of Swornegacie with the Brda River in the foreground and the Saint Barbara church in the background

- Location within Poland
- Coordinates: 53°51′36″N 17°29′57″E
- Country: Poland
- Voivodeship: Pomeranian
- County: Chojnice
- Gmina: Chojnice
- First mentioned: 1272
- Population: 1,080
- Time zone: UTC+1 (CET)
  - Summer (DST): UTC+2 (CEST)
- Vehicle registration: GCH

Swornegacie [sfɔrnɛˈɡat͡ɕɛ] is a village in the administrative district of Gmina Chojnice, within Chojnice County, Pomeranian Voivodeship, in northern Poland. It is located within the historic region of Pomerania.

== History ==
The oldest known mention of the village comes from a document of Pope Gregory X from 1272. Swornegacie was a royal village of the Polish Crown, administratively located in the Tuchola County in the Pomeranian Voivodeship.

During the German occupation of Poland (World War II), the occupiers carried out expulsions of Poles, who were then mostly deported to forced labour to Germany, while their farms were handed over to German colonists as part of the Lebensraum policy.

== Notable people ==
- Joachim Joachimczyk (1914–1981), Polish photojournalist, member of the Polish resistance movement during World War II, participant in the Warsaw Uprising.
