= Hein van Suylekom =

Dutch rower (1904–1982)

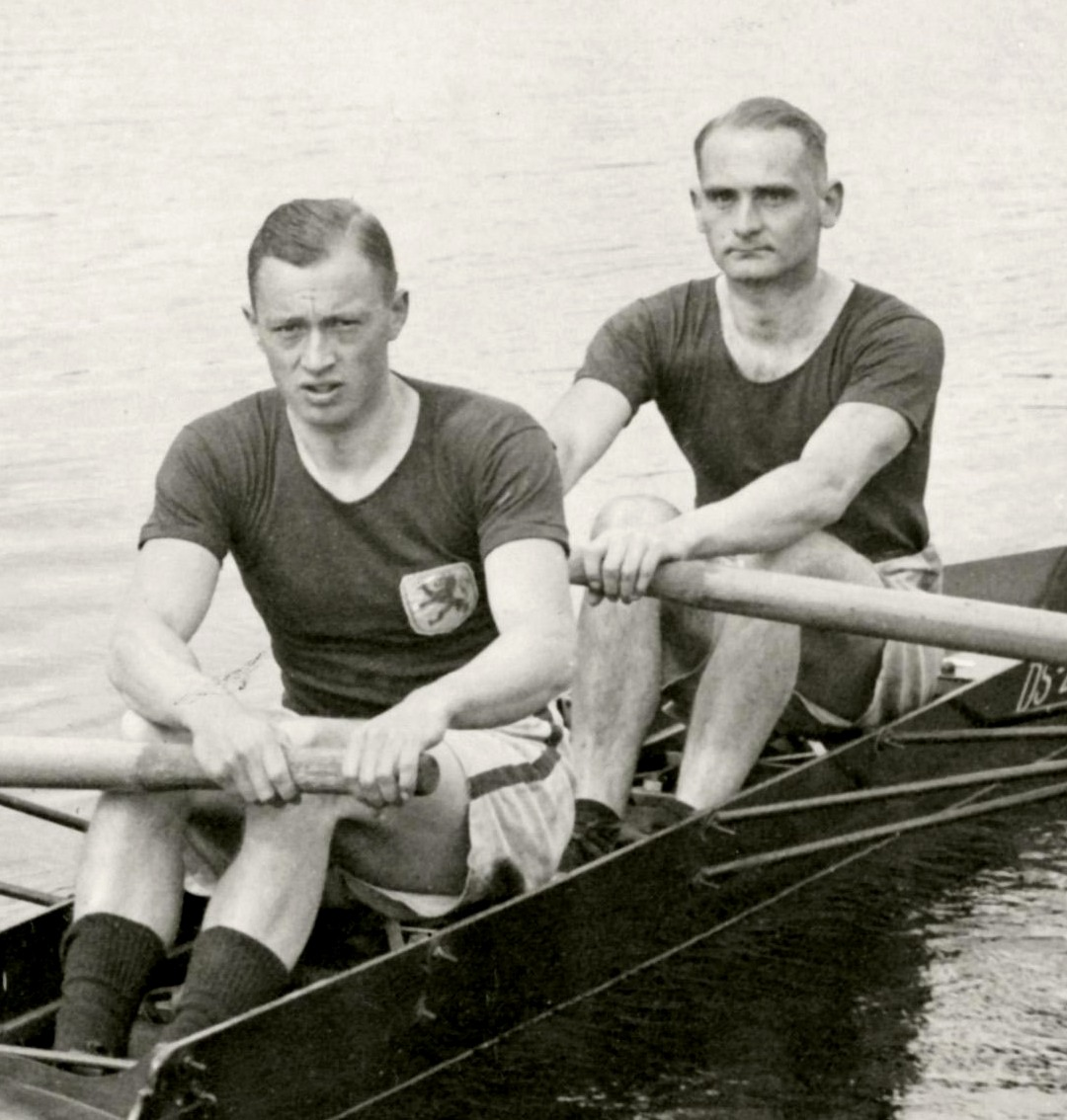
- Hein van Suylekom and Carel van Wankum at the 1928 Olympics

Personal information
- Born: 17 March 1904 Rotterdam, Netherlands
- Died: 11 December 1982 (aged 78) Rijswijk, Netherlands

Sport
- Sport: Rowing
- Club: DDS, Delft
Medal record
Representing the Netherlands
European Rowing Championships
Bronze medal – third place	1925 Prague	Coxed pair
Bronze medal – third place	1926 Lucerne	Coxless pair
Bronze medal – third place	1927 Como	Coxless pair

Hendrik Christiaan "Hein" van Suylekom (17 March 1904 – 11 December 1982) was a Dutch rower. Together with Carel van Wankum he won three bronze medals at the European championships of 1925–1927. The pair competed at the 1928 Summer Olympics, but failed to reach the final. Twenty years later, aged 44, van Suylekom competed at the 1948 Games in the coxless fours event, but his team was again eliminated in a preliminary round.
