= Alois Reinhard =

Swiss rower

Sport
- Sport: Rowing
- Club: RC Reuss Luzern
Medal record
Men's rowing
Representing Switzerland
European Rowing Championships
Silver medal – second place	1922 Barcelona	Coxed four
Gold medal – first place	1924 Zürich	Coxless pair
Gold medal – first place	1925 Prague	Coxless pair
Gold medal – first place	1925 Prague	Coxed pair
Gold medal – first place	1926 Lucerne	Coxless pair
Gold medal – first place	1926 Lucerne	Coxless four
Silver medal – second place	1927 Como	Coxless pair

Alois Reinhard was a Swiss rower. He competed at the 1928 Summer Olympics in Amsterdam with the men's coxless pair where they were eliminated in the quarter-final.
