= Romeo Sisti =

Italian rower

Personal information
- Born: 9 February 1902 Ancona, Italy
- Died: 13 October 1971 (aged 69) Ancona, Italy

Sport
- Sport: Rowing
Medal record
Men's rowing
Representing Italy
European Rowing Championships
Gold medal – first place	1929 Bydgoszcz	Coxless pair
Silver medal – second place	1931 Paris	Coxed pair

Romeo Sisti (9 February 1902 – 13 October 1971) was an Italian rower. He competed at the 1928 Summer Olympics in Amsterdam with the men's coxless pair where they came fourth.
