= Sándor Hautzinger =

Hungarian rower

Personal information
- Born: 21 November 1885 Loipersbach im Burgenland, Austria-Hungary
- Died: 2 May 1973 (aged 87)
- Weight: 79 kg (174 lb)

Sport
- Sport: Rowing
- Club: Pannónia Evezős Egylet
Medal record
Men's rowing
Representing Hungary
European Rowing Championships
Bronze medal – third place	1910 Ostend	Eight
Silver medal – second place	1921 Amsterdam	Eight
Bronze medal – third place	1922 Barcelona	Eight
Bronze medal – third place	1923 Como	Coxed four
Silver medal – second place	1925 Prague	Coxed four

Sándor Hautzinger (21 November 1885 – 2 May 1973), also known as Alexander Hautzinger, was a Hungarian rower. He competed at the 1908 Summer Olympics in London with the men's eight where they were eliminated in round one.
