= Carel van Wankum =

Dutch rower

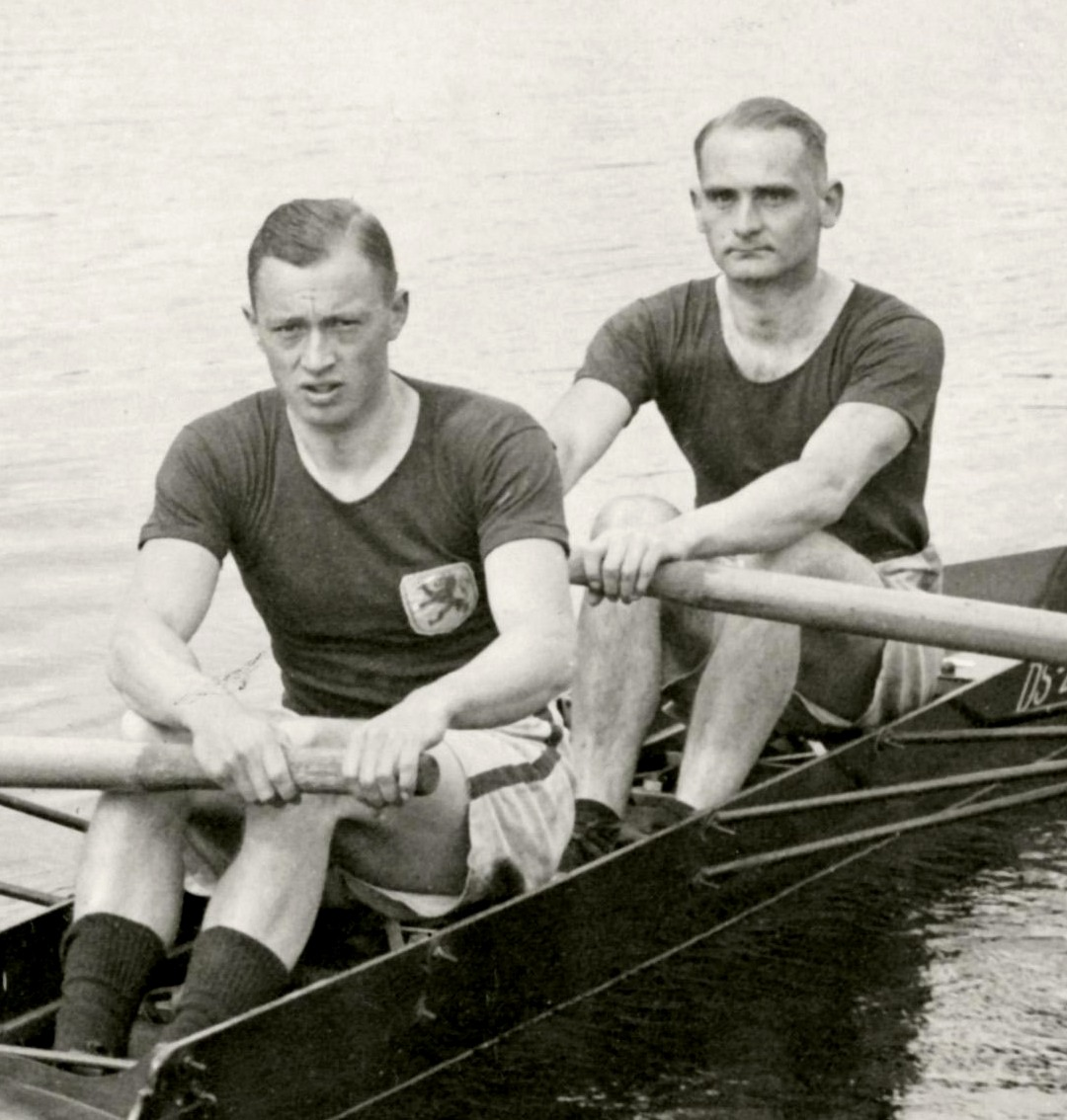
- Hein van Suylekom and Carel van Wankum at the 1928 Olympics

Personal information
- Born: 22 April 1896 Amsterdam, the Netherlands
- Died: 20 October 1961 (aged 65) Overschie, the Netherlands

Sport
- Sport: Rowing
- Club: Dare Devil Club, Rotterdam
Medal record
Representing the Netherlands
European Rowing Championships
Bronze medal – third place	1925 Prague	Coxed pair
Bronze medal – third place	1926 Lucerne	Coxless pair
Bronze medal – third place	1927 Como	Coxless pair

Carel Anthonie van Wankum (22 April 1896 – 20 October 1961) was a Dutch rower. Together with Hein van Suylekom he won three bronze medals at the European championships of 1925–1927. The pair competed at the 1928 Summer Olympics, but failed to reach the final.
