= Walter Ludin =

Swiss rowing cox

Personal information
- Born: 27 February 1908 Switzerland
- Died: April 1964 (aged 56)

Sport
- Sport: Rowing
Medal record
Men's rowing
Representing Switzerland
European Rowing Championships
| Gold medal – first place | 1925 Prague | Coxed pair |
| Bronze medal – third place | 1925 Prague | Coxed four |
| Silver medal – second place | 1927 Como | Eight |
| Silver medal – second place | 1949 Amsterdam | Coxed four |
| Silver medal – second place | 1950 Milan | Coxed pair |
| Silver medal – second place | 1951 Mâcon | Coxed four |
| Silver medal – second place | 1951 Mâcon | Coxed pair |
| Gold medal – first place | 1954 Amsterdam | Coxed pair |
| Gold medal – first place | 1955 Ghent | Coxed pair |

Walter Ludin (27 February 1908 – April 1964) was a Swiss coxswain. He competed at the 1952 Summer Olympics in Helsinki with the men's coxed pair where they were eliminated in the round one repêchage.

Ludin won medals at various European Rowing Championships in the coxed pair boat class: silver in 1950 and 1951, and gold in 1954 and 1955. He won two European silver medals, in 1949 and 1951, with the coxed four.
