= Zoltán Török =

Hungarian rower

Personal information
- Born: 12 August 1899 Tulgheș, Hungary
- Died: 12 February 1970 (aged 70) Budapest, Hungary

Sport
- Sport: Rowing
- Club: Pannónia Evezős Egylet
Medal record
Men's rowing
Representing Hungary
European Rowing Championships
Bronze medal – third place	1922 Barcelona	Eight
Bronze medal – third place	1923 Como	Coxed four
Silver medal – second place	1925 Prague	Coxed four
Bronze medal – third place	1931 Paris	Eight
Gold medal – first place	1932 Belgrade	Coxless four
Bronze medal – third place	1933 Budapest	Coxless four

Zoltán Török (12 August 1899 – 12 February 1970) was a Hungarian rower. He competed at the 1924 Summer Olympics in Paris with the men's coxed four where they were eliminated in the round one repechage.
