= Nino Bolzoni =

Italian rower (1903–1972)

Personal information
- Born: Nino Ultimo Bolzoni; 7 September 1903 Cremona, Italy
- Died: 13 May 1972 (aged 68) Cremona, Italy

Sport
- Sport: Rowing
- Club: Società Canottieri Baldesio, Cremona
Medal record
Men's rowing
Representing Italy
European Rowing Championships
Gold medal – first place	1929 Bydgoszcz	Coxless pair

Nino Ultimo Bolzoni (7 September 1903 – 13 May 1972) was an Italian rower. He competed at the 1928 Summer Olympics in Amsterdam with the men's coxless pair where they came fourth.
