= Henri Gatineau =

French rower

Personal information
- Full name: Henri Edmond Simon Gatineau
- Nationality: French
- Born: 18 March 1897; Saint-Mandé, France
- Died: 18 February 1984 (aged 86); Grigny, France

Sport
- Sport: Rowing

Henri Edmond Simon Gatineau (18 March 1897 – 18 February 1984) was a French rower. He competed at the 1924 Summer Olympics and the 1928 Summer Olympics.
