= Hachiro Sato =

Japanese rower

Personal information
- Nationality: Japanese

Sport
- Sport: Rowing

Hachiro Sato (佐藤 八郎, Satō Hachirō) was a Japanese rower. He competed in the men's coxed four event at the 1928 Summer Olympics. Sato is deceased.
