= Vincent Saurin =

French rower (1907–1991)

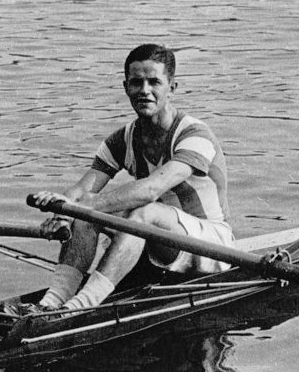
- Vincent Saurin in 1929

Personal information
- Born: 17 April 1907
- Died: 13 December 1991 (aged 84)

Sport
- Sport: Rowing
Medal record
Representing France
European Rowing Championships
Bronze medal – third place	1931 Paris	Single sculls
Silver medal – second place	1932 Belgrade	Single sculls
Bronze medal – third place	1934 Lucerne	Single sculls

Vincent Saurin (17 April 1907 – 13 December 1991) was a French rower who specialised in single sculls. In this event he won nine national titles and three medals at the European championships of 1931–1934. He competed at the 1928 Summer Olympics, but failed to reach the final. Later he changed to coxless fours and won medals at French championships in 1939 and 1943. Between 1952 and 1988 he served as president of Société Nautique De Lagny Aviron.
