= Canada at the 1928 Summer Olympics =

- IOC code: CAN
- NOC: Canadian Olympic Committee

in Amsterdam
- Competitors: 69 (62 men, 7 women) in 8 sports
- Flag bearer: Joseph Wright Jr.
- Medals Ranked 10th: Gold 4 Silver 4 Bronze 7 Total 15

Summer Olympics appearances (overview)
- ~~1900~~; 1904; 1908; 1912; 1920; 1924; 1928; 1932; 1936; 1948; 1952; 1956; 1960; 1964; 1968; 1972; 1976; 1980; 1984; 1988; 1992; 1996; 2000; 2004; 2008; 2012; 2016; 2020; 2024; 2028

Other related appearances
- 1906 Intercalated Games

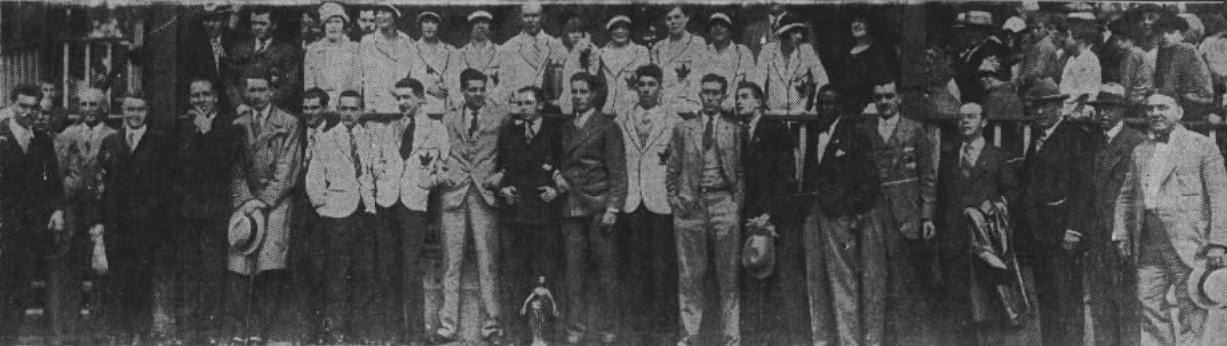
1928 Canadian Olympic team

Canada competed at the 1928 Summer Olympics in Amsterdam, Netherlands. 69 competitors, 62 men and 7 women, took part in 49 events in 8 sports.

== Medallists ==
Medal	Name	Sport	Event	Date
Gold	Percy Williams	Athletics	Men's 100 m	July 30
Gold	Percy Williams	Athletics	Men's 200 m	August 1
Gold	Jane Bell, Myrtle Cook, Bobbie Rosenfeld, Ethel Smith	Athletics	Women's 4 × 100 m relay	August 5
Gold	Ethel Catherwood	Athletics	Women's high jump	August 5
Silver	Jimmy Ball	Athletics	Men's 400 m	August 3
Silver	Bobbie Rosenfeld	Athletics	Women's 100 m	July 31
Silver	Jack Guest, Joseph Wright Jr.	Rowing	Men's double sculls	August 10
Silver	Donald Stockton	Wrestling	Men's freestyle middleweight	August 1
Bronze	Jimmy Ball, Phil Edwards, Stanley Glover, Alex Wilson	Athletics	Men's 4 × 400 m relay	August 5
Bronze	Ethel Smith	Athletics	Women's 100 m	July 31
Bronze	Raymond Smillie	Boxing	Men's welterweight	August 11
Bronze	John Donnelly, Frank Fiddes, John Hand; Frederick Hedges, Athol Meech, Jack Murdoch, Edgar Norris, Herbert Richardson, William Ross	Rowing	Men's eight	August 10
Bronze	Garnet Ault, Munroe Bourne, Walter Spence, James Thompson	Swimming	Men's 4 × 200 m freestyle relay	August 11
Bronze	James Trifunov	Wrestling	Men's freestyle bantamweight	August 1
Bronze	Maurice Letchford	Wrestling	Men's freestyle welterweight	August 1

== Athletics ==
Canada's track and field athletes departed Montreal on July 11, aboard SS Albertic bound for Amsterdam.

32 athletes represented Canada in 1928. It was the nation's 7th appearance in the sport, having competed in athletics at every Olympics to date. After failing to win any medals in 1924, Canada returned to the athletics podium in 1928 with 4 golds, 2 silvers, and 2 bronzes.

The women's relay team broke the world record twice on the way to winning the gold medal. Percy Williams won both of the men's sprint events, twice matching the Olympic record in the 100 metres. Bobbie Rosenfeld briefly held the Olympic record in the women's 100 metres, setting it at 12.4 seconds in the semifinals before that mark was bested by all three medalists, including Rosenfeld and Smith (with the record ultimately ending with American gold medalist Betty Robinson at 12.2 seconds).

After the Olympics, some of the Canadian athletes participated in the Tailteann Games in Ireland, the British Army Games in England, and the Scottish Games in Glasgow. Canadian athletes also participated in events at Paris and London, and sailed home aboard SS Doric, after winning the Wyoming Cup as a team in Scotland.

Track and road events

Athlete	Event	Heat		Quarterfinal		Semifinal		Final	
Athlete	Event	Result	Rank	Result	Rank	Result	Rank	Result	Rank
Ralph Adams	Men's 100 metres	unknown	2 Q	unknown	4	did not advance			
John Fitzpatrick	Men's 100 metres	11.0	1 Q	unknown	2 Q	10.9	6	did not advance	
George Hester	Men's 100 metres	unknown	2 Q	unknown	4	did not advance			
Percy Williams	Men's 100 metres	11.0	1 Q	10.6 =OR	1 Q	10.6 =OR	2 Q	10.8	1st place, gold medalist(s)
Jane Bell	Women's 100 metres	—N/a		13.0	2 Q	unknown	3	did not advance	
Myrtle Cook	Women's 100 metres	—N/a		12.8	1 Q	unknown	2 Q	DQ	–
Bobbie Rosenfeld	Women's 100 metres	—N/a		12.6	1 Q	12.4 OR	1 Q	12.3	2nd place, silver medalist(s)
Ethel Smith	Women's 100 metres	—N/a		12.6	1 Q	unknown	2 Q	12.3	3rd place, bronze medalist(s)
Ralph Adams	Men's 200 metres	22.5	2 Q	unknown	3	did not advance			
John Fitzpatrick	Men's 200 metres	22.8	1 Q	22.0	1 Q	22.0	3 Q	22.1	5
George Hester	Men's 200 metres	DQ	–	did not advance					
Percy Williams	Men's 200 metres	22.6	1 Q	21.8	2 Q	22.0	1 Q	21.8	1st place, gold medalist(s)
Jimmy Ball	Men's 400 metres	55.8	1 Q	49.2	1 Q	48.6	1 Q	48.0	2nd place, silver medalist(s)
Phil Edwards	Men's 400 metres	49.8	1 Q	49.2	1 Q	50.2	6	did not advance	
Fred Macbeth	Men's 400 metres	unknown	2 Q	unknown	5	did not advance			
Alex Wilson	Men's 400 metres	49.9	2 Q	unknown	2 Q	49.2	4	did not advance	
Brant Little	Men's 800 metres	—N/a		1:57.8	2 Q	1:57.6	4	did not advance	
Phil Edwards	Men's 800 metres	—N/a		1:59.4	1 Q	1:52.8	2 Q	1:54.0	4
Jack Walter	Men's 800 metres	—N/a		unknown	5	did not advance			
Alex Wilson	Men's 800 metres	—N/a		1:59.2	1 Q	1:57.1	6	did not advance	
Bobbie Rosenfeld	Women's 800 metres	—N/a				unknown	3 Q	2:22.4	5
Jean Thompson	Women's 800 metres	—N/a				2:23.2	1 Q	2:21.4	4
Alex Docherty	Men's 1500 metres	—N/a				unknown	5	did not advance	
David Griffin	Men's 1500 metres	—N/a				unknown	4	did not advance	
Jack Walter	Men's 1500 metres	—N/a				unknown	6	did not advance	
Pete Walter	Men's 1500 metres	—N/a				unknown	7	did not advance	
Vincent Callard	Men's 5000 metres	—N/a				unknown	8	did not advance	
Art Keay	Men's 5000 metres	—N/a				DNF	–	did not advance	
Warren Montabone	Men's 400 metres hurdles	—N/a		56.5	4	did not advance			
Art Keay	Men's 3000 metres steeplechase	—N/a				unknown	8	did not advance	
Ralph Adams; John Fitzpatrick; George Hester; Percy Williams	Men's 4 × 100 metres relay	—N/a				42.2	1 Q	DQ	–
Jane Bell; Myrtle Cook; Bobbie Rosenfeld; Ethel Smith	Women's 4 × 100 metres relay	—N/a				49.3 WR	1 Q	48.4 WR	1st place, gold medalist(s)
Jimmy Ball; Phil Edwards; Stan Glover; Alex Wilson (Canadian sprinter)	Men's 4 × 400 metres relay	—N/a				unknown	2 Q	3:15.4	3rd place, bronze medalist(s)
Clifford Bricker	Men's marathon	—N/a						2:39:24	10
Frank Hughes	Men's marathon	—N/a						2:58:12	43
Silas McLellan	Men's marathon	—N/a						2:49:33	26
Johnny Miles	Men's marathon	—N/a						2:43:32	17
Percy Wyer	Men's marathon	—N/a						2:58:52	45

== Boxing ==
7 boxers, all men, represented Canada in 1928. It was the nation's 3rd appearance in the sport. Canada had a boxer in every weight class except the heavyweight. For the second straight Games, Canada won exactly one bronze medal in boxing.

Athlete	Event	Round of 32	Round of 16	Quarterfinals	Semifinals	Final / bronze match	
Athlete	Event	Opposition Result	Opposition Result	Opposition Result	Opposition Result	Opposition Result	Rank
Frankie Martin	Men's flyweight	bye	Armand Apell (FRA); L points	did not advance			9
Vince Glionna	Men's bantamweight	bye	Hans Ziglarski (GER); W points	Harry Isaacs (RSA); L points	did not advance		5
Frederick Volkert	Men's featherweight	bye	Jan Górny (POL); L points	did not advance			9
Frank Battaglia	Men's lightweight	Robert Smith (RSA); L points	did not advance				17
Raymond Smillie	Men's welterweight	Johann Fraberger (AUT); W points	Patrick Lenehan (IRL); W points	Kintaro Usuda (JPN); W points	Raúl Landini (ARG); L points	Robert Galataud (FRA); W points	3rd place, bronze medalist(s)
Honoré Chevrier	Men's middleweight	bye	Oscar Kjällander (SWE); L points	did not advance			9
Donald Carrick	Men's light heavyweight	—N/a	Jean Welter (LUX); W points	Víctor Avendaño (ARG); L points	did not advance		5

== Cycling ==
Six cyclists, all men, represented Canada in 1928. It was the nation's 5th appearance in the sport. Joe Laporte had previously competed in 1924.

=== Road cycling ===
Cyclist	Event	Time	Rank
Lew Elder	Men's road race	DNF	–
Joe Laporte	Men's road race	5:21:30	31
William Peden	Men's road race	6:09:26	63
Alfred Tourville	Men's road race	5:51:05	56
Joe Laporte	Men's team road race	17:22:01	14
William Peden	Men's team road race	17:22:01	14
Alfred Tourville	Men's team road race	17:22:01	14

=== Track cycling ===
Time trial

Cyclist	Event	Time	Rank
Lew Elder	Men's time trial	1:19.0	11

Match races

Cyclist	Event	1st Round		Repechage 1		Repechage Final		Quarterfinals		Semifinals		Final / bronze match	
Cyclist	Event	Time	Rank	Time	Rank	Time	Rank	Time	Rank	Time	Rank	Time	Rank
James Davies	Men's team pursuit	unknown	2 q	—N/a				unknown	2	did not advance			
Lew Elder	Men's team pursuit	unknown	2 q	—N/a				unknown	2	did not advance			
Andy Houting	Men's team pursuit	unknown	2 q	—N/a				unknown	2	did not advance			
William Peden	Men's team pursuit	unknown	2 q	—N/a				unknown	2	did not advance			
James Davies	Men's sprint	unknown	2 R	unknown	3	did not advance							

== Diving ==
One man represented Canada in diving in 1928. It was the nation's 4th appearance in the sport and first since 1920. Phillips advanced to the finals in both events, placing 7th in each.

Diver	Event	Semifinals			Final		
Diver	Event	Points	Score	Rank	Points	Score	Rank
Alfred Phillips	Men's 3 m board	17	134.10	3 Q	32.5	149.48	7
Alfred Phillips	Men's 10 m platform	14	78.42	3 Q	35	77.26	7

== Rowing ==
11 rowers, all men, represented Canada in 1928. It was the nation's 6th appearance in the sport, tying Belgium and Great Britain for most appearances. Canada had 3 boats compete and won one silver medal in men's double sculls (matching its best ever result in the sport) and one bronze medal in the men's eight, as well as an effectively 5th place finish in men's single sculls after Wright was defeated in the quarterfinal round.

Rower	Event	Round 1		Repechage 1		Round 2		Repechage 2		Round 3		Semifinals		Final	
Rower	Event	Time	Rank	Time	Rank	Time	Rank	Time	Rank	Time	Rank	Time	Rank	Time	Rank
Joseph Wright Jr.	Men's single sculls	7:57.8	1 Q	bye		8:45.0	2 R	7:49.6	1 Q	7:57.6	2	did not advance			
Joseph Wright Jr.	Men's double sculls	7:48.2	1 Q	bye		6:58.6	2 R	7:21.8	1 Q	6:42.2	1 Q	6:58.0	1 Q	6:51.0	2nd place, silver medalist(s)
Jack Guest	Men's double sculls	7:48.2	1 Q	bye		6:58.6	2 R	7:21.8	1 Q	6:42.2	1 Q	6:58.0	1 Q	6:51.0	2nd place, silver medalist(s)
Frank Fiddes	Men's eight	6:29.8	1 Q	bye		6:59.0	1 Q	bye		6:37.4	1 Q	6:03.8	2 ( (bronze) )	did not advance	
John Hand	Men's eight	6:29.8	1 Q	bye		6:59.0	1 Q	bye		6:37.4	1 Q	6:03.8	2 ( (bronze) )	did not advance	
Frederick Hedges	Men's eight	6:29.8	1 Q	bye		6:59.0	1 Q	bye		6:37.4	1 Q	6:03.8	2 ( (bronze) )	did not advance	
Athol Meech	Men's eight	6:29.8	1 Q	bye		6:59.0	1 Q	bye		6:37.4	1 Q	6:03.8	2 ( (bronze) )	did not advance	
Jack Murdoch	Men's eight	6:29.8	1 Q	bye		6:59.0	1 Q	bye		6:37.4	1 Q	6:03.8	2 ( (bronze) )	did not advance	
Edgar Norris	Men's eight	6:29.8	1 Q	bye		6:59.0	1 Q	bye		6:37.4	1 Q	6:03.8	2 ( (bronze) )	did not advance	
Herbert Richardson	Men's eight	6:29.8	1 Q	bye		6:59.0	1 Q	bye		6:37.4	1 Q	6:03.8	2 ( (bronze) )	did not advance	
William Ross	Men's eight	6:29.8	1 Q	bye		6:59.0	1 Q	bye		6:37.4	1 Q	6:03.8	2 ( (bronze) )	did not advance	
John Donnelly (cox)	Men's eight	6:29.8	1 Q	bye		6:59.0	1 Q	bye		6:37.4	1 Q	6:03.8	2 ( (bronze) )	did not advance	

== Swimming ==
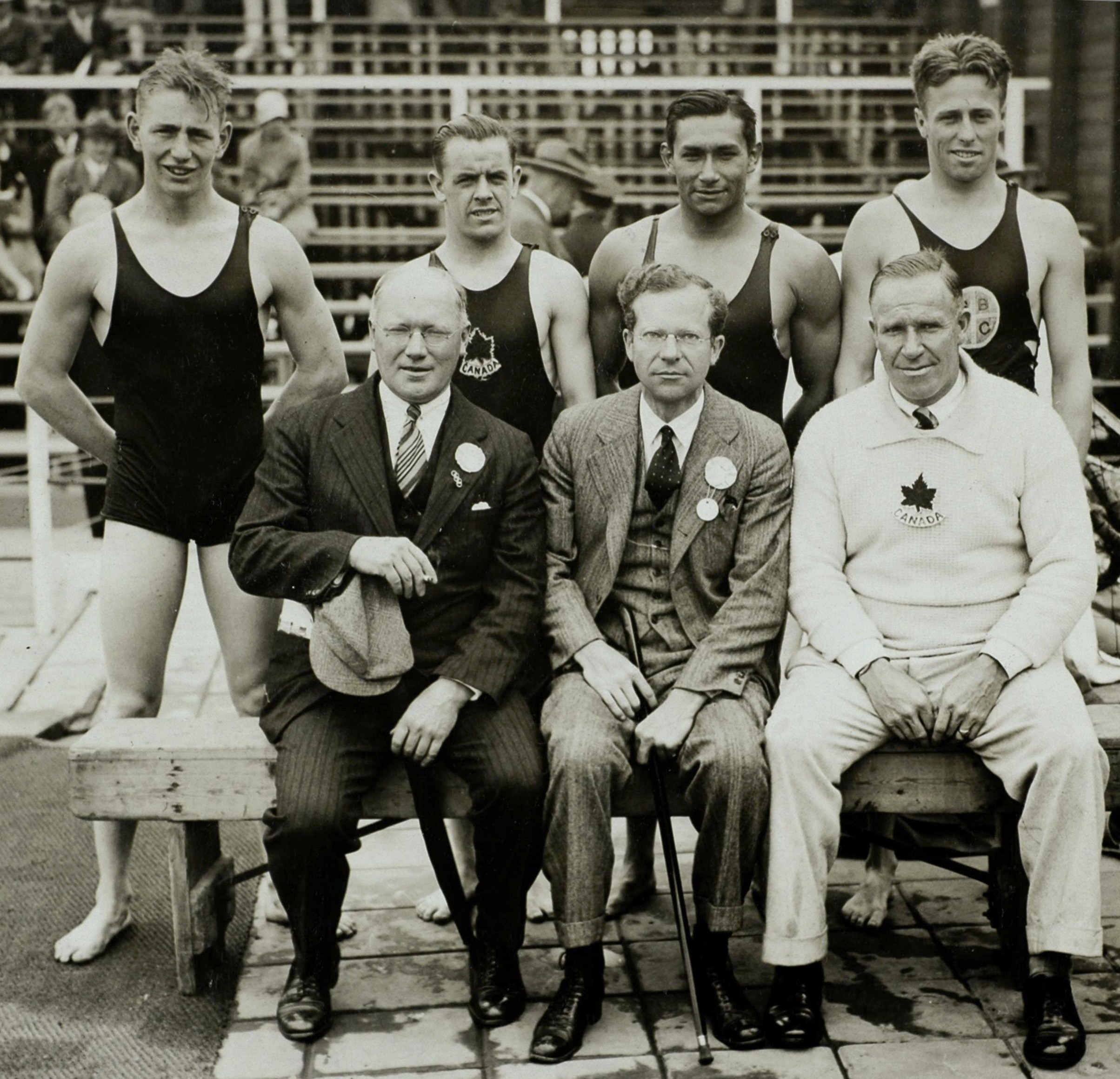
Bronze medalists in the 4×200-metre relay. Back row, left to right: Munroe Bourne, James Thompson, Walter Spence, and Garnet Ault

6 swimmers, 5 men and 1 women, represented Canada in 1928. It was nation's 5th appearance in the sport and the first time the nation sent a female swimmer. Canada won a bronze medal in the men's relay, the first medal in the sport for Canada since 1920. In the individual events, Canadian swimmers advanced to 3 finals but took 6th place each time.

Swimmer	Event	Heat		Semifinal		Final	
Swimmer	Event	Time	Rank	Time	Rank	Time	Rank
Munroe Bourne	Men's 100 m freestyle	unknown	4	did not advance			
Walter Spence	Men's 100 m freestyle	1:00.6	2 Q	1:01.4	3 q	1:01.4	6
Garnet Ault	Men's 400 m freestyle	5:18.8	1 Q	unknown	4	did not advance	
James Thompson	Men's 400 m freestyle	unknown	4	did not advance			
Garnet Ault	Men's 1500 m freestyle	22:55.8	2 Q	21:33.4	3 Q	21:46.0	6
James Thompson	Men's 1500 m freestyle	22:56.6	3	did not advance			
Munroe Bourne	Men's 100 metre backstroke	1:14.4	2 Q	unknown	4	did not advance	
Jack Aubin	Men's 200 metre breaststroke	unknown	4	did not advance			
Walter Spence	Men's 200 metre breaststroke	2:56.6	1 Q	2:53.0	2 Q	2:57.2	6
Dorothy Prior	Women's 200 metre breaststroke	unknown	4	did not advance			
Garnet Ault	Men's 4 × 200 metre freestyle relay	—N/a		9:55.0	1 Q	9:47.8	3rd place, bronze medalist(s)
Munroe Bourne	Men's 4 × 200 metre freestyle relay	—N/a		9:55.0	1 Q	9:47.8	3rd place, bronze medalist(s)
Walter Spence	Men's 4 × 200 metre freestyle relay	—N/a		9:55.0	1 Q	9:47.8	3rd place, bronze medalist(s)
James Thompson	Men's 4 × 200 metre freestyle relay	—N/a		9:55.0	1 Q	9:47.8	3rd place, bronze medalist(s)

== Wrestling ==
5 wrestlers, all men, competed for Canada in 1928. They competed only in the freestyle discipline. It was the nation's 4th appearance in the sport. Canadian wrestlers won a silver medal (the nation's best result in the sport so far, improving on a bronze medal in 1908) and 2 bronze medals.

=== Freestyle wrestling ===
Wrestler	Event	Gold medal rounds				Silver medal rounds		Bronze medal rounds		Rank
Wrestler	Event	Round of 16	Quarterfinals	Semifinals	Final	Semifinals	Final	Semifinals	Final	Rank
Wrestler	Event	Opposition Result	Opposition Result	Opposition Result	Opposition Result	Opposition Result	Opposition Result	Opposition Result	Opposition Result	Rank
James Trifunov	Men's bantamweight	—N/a	Spapen (BEL); L	did not advance		Not qualified		—N/a	Sansum (GBR); W	3rd place, bronze medalist(s)
Daniel MacDonald	Men's featherweight	bye	Angus (GBR); W	Minder (SUI); L	did not advance	Not qualified				6
Maurice Letchford	Men's welterweight	bye	Roosen (BEL); W	Appleton (USA); L	did not advance	Not qualified		Cook (GBR); W	Jourlin (FRA); W	3rd place, bronze medalist(s)
Donald Stockton	Men's middleweight	bye	Rabin (GBR); W	Kyburz (SUI); L	did not advance	Hammonds (USA); W	Praeg (RSA); W	Already ranked		2nd place, silver medalist(s)
Earl McCready	Men's heavyweight	—N/a	George (USA); L	did not advance		Not qualified				6
