= Rowing at the 1928 Summer Olympics =

Coordinates: 52.3385°N 4.7942°E

Rowing at the Games of the IX Olympiad
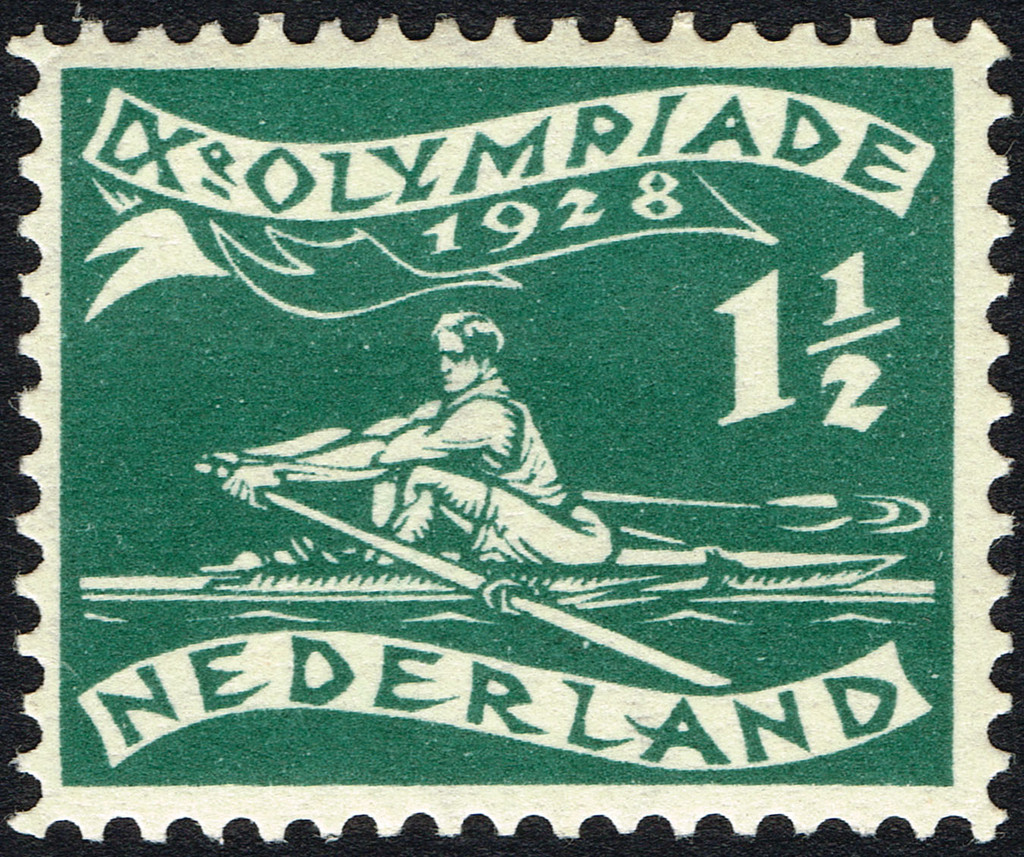
- Rowing at the 1928 Summer Olympics on a stamp of the Netherlands
- Dates: 2–10 August 1928
- Competitors: 245 from 19 nations

Rowing at the 1928 Summer Olympics featured seven events, for men only. The competitions were held from 2 to 10 August.

== Medal summary ==
Event	Gold	Silver	Bronze
Single sculls	Bobby Pearce; Australia	Ken Myers; United States	David Collet; Great Britain
Double sculls	Paul Costello and Charles McIlvaine; United States	Joseph Wright Jr. and Jack Guest; Canada	Leo Losert and Viktor Flessl; Austria
Coxless pair	Kurt Moeschter and Bruno Müller; Germany	Terence O'Brien and Robert Nisbet; Great Britain	Paul McDowell and John Schmitt; United States
Coxed pair	Switzerland; Hans Schöchlin; Karl Schöchlin; Hans Bourquin	France; Armand Marcelle; Édouard Marcelle; Henri Préaux	Belgium; Léon Flament; François de Coninck; Georges Anthony
Coxless four	Great Britain; John Lander; Michael Warriner; Richard Beesly; Edward Vaughan Bevan	United States; Charles Karle; William Miller; George Healis; Ernest Bayer	Italy; Cesare Rossi; Pietro Freschi; Umberto Bonadè; Paolo Gennari
Coxed four	Italy; Valerio Perentin; Giliante D'Este; Nicolò Vittori; Giovanni Delise; Renato Petronio	Switzerland; Ernst Haas; Joseph Meyer; Otto Bucher; Karl Schwegler; Fritz Bösch	Poland; Franciszek Bronikowski; Edmund Jankowski; Leon Birkholc; Bernard Ormanowski; Bolesław Drewek
Eight	United States; Marvin Stalder; John Brinck; Francis Frederick; William Thompson; William Dally; James Workman; Hubert A. Caldwell; Peter Donlon; Donald Blessing	Great Britain; Jamie Hamilton; Guy Oliver Nickalls; John Badcock; Donald Gollan; Harold Lane; Gordon Killick; Jack Beresford; Harold West; Arthur Sulley	Canada; Frederick Hedges; Frank Fiddes; John Hand; Herbert Richardson; Jack Murdoch; Athol Meech; Edgar Norris; William Ross; John Donnelly

== Participating nations ==
A total of 244 rowers from 19 nations competed at the Amsterdam Games:

- Austria (2)
- Argentina (9)
- Australia (1)
- Belgium (21)
- Canada (11)
- Czechoslovakia (1)
- Denmark (10)
- France (26)
- Germany (23)
- Great Britain (22)
- Hungary (6)
- Italy (26)
- Japan (6)
- Monaco (5)
- Netherlands (21)
- Poland (14)
- South Africa (1)
- Switzerland (13)
- United States (26)

Only one rower (Joseph Wright Jr.) and one coxswain (Georges Anthony) competed in more than one event.

== Medal table ==
Rank	Nation	Gold	Silver	Bronze	Total
1	United States	2	2	1	5
2	Great Britain	1	2	1	4
3	Switzerland	1	1	0	2
4	Italy	1	0	1	2
5	Australia	1	0	0	1
5	Germany	1	0	0	1
7	Canada	0	1	1	2
8	France	0	1	0	1
9	Austria	0	0	1	1
9	Belgium	0	0	1	1
9	Poland	0	0	1	1
Totals (11 entries)		7	7	7	21

== See also ==
- Rowing at the Summer Olympics
