= Great Britain at the 1928 Summer Olympics =

- Flag of the United Kingdom
- IOC code: GBR
- NOC: British Olympic Association

in Amsterdam
- Competitors: 232 in 14 sports
- Flag bearer: Malcolm Nokes
- Medals Ranked 11th: Gold 3 Silver 10 Bronze 7 Total 20

Summer Olympics appearances (overview)
- 1896; 1900; 1904; 1908; 1912; 1920; 1924; 1928; 1932; 1936; 1948; 1952; 1956; 1960; 1964; 1968; 1972; 1976; 1980; 1984; 1988; 1992; 1996; 2000; 2004; 2008; 2012; 2016; 2020; 2024

Other related appearances
- 1906 Intercalated Games

Great Britain, represented by the British Olympic Association (BOA), competed at the 1928 Summer Olympics in Amsterdam, Netherlands. British athletes won only three gold medals (down from nine in 1924), and twenty medals overall, finishing eleventh. 232 competitors, 201 men and 31 women, took part in 84 events in 14 sports.

== Medallists ==
Medal	Name	Sport	Event	Date
Gold	Douglas Lowe	Athletics	Men's 800 m	July 31
Gold	David Cecil	Athletics	Men's 400 m hurdles	July 30
Gold	Richard Beesly, John Lander, Edward Vaughan Bevan, Michael Warriner	Rowing	Men's coxless four	August 10
Silver	Jack London	Athletics	Men's 100 m	July 30
Silver	Walter Rangeley	Athletics	Men's 200 m	August 1
Silver	Frank Southall	Cycling	Men's individual road race	August 7
Silver	Jack Lauterwasser, John Middleton, Frank Southall	Cycling	Men's team road race	August 7
Silver	Ernest Chambers, John Sibbit	Cycling	Men's tandem	August 7
Silver	Muriel Freeman	Fencing	Women's foil	August 1
Silver	Robert Nisbet, Terence O'Brien	Rowing	Men's coxless pair	August 10
Silver	John Badcock, Jack Beresford, Donald Gollan, Jamie Hamilton, Gordon Killick, Harold Lane, Guy Oliver Nickalls, Arthur Sulley, Harold West	Rowing	Men's eight	August 10
Silver	Ellen King	Swimming	Women's 100 m backstroke	August 11
Silver	Joyce Cooper, Ellen King, Cissie Stewart, Iris Tanner	Swimming	Women's 4 × 100 m freestyle relay	August 9
Bronze	Cyril Gill, Jack London, Walter Rangeley, Edward Smouha	Athletics	Men's 4 × 100 m relay	August 5
Bronze	George Southall, Harry Wyld, Lew Wyld, Percy Wyld	Cycling	Men's team pursuit	August 6
Bronze	Annie Broadbent, Lucy Desmond, Margaret Hartley, Amy Jagger, Isobel Judd, Jessie Kite, Marjorie Moreman, Edith Pickles, Ethel Seymour, Ada Smith, Hilda Smith, Doris Woods	Gymnastics	Women's team all-around	August 9
Bronze	Theodore Collet	Rowing	Men's single sculls	August 10
Bronze	Joyce Cooper	Swimming	Women's 100 m freestyle	August 11
Bronze	Joyce Cooper	Swimming	Women's 100 m backstroke	August 11
Bronze	Samuel Rabin	Wrestling	Men's freestyle middleweight	August 1

== Boxing ==
Men's Flyweight (– 50.8 kg)

- Cuthbert Taylor

- First Round — Bye
- Second Round — Defeated Juan José Trillo (ARG), points
- Quarterfinals — Lost to Armand Apell (FRA), points

Men's Lightweight (– 61.2 kg)

- Fred Webster

- First Round — Bye
- Second Round — Lost to David Baan (HOL), points

Men's Light Heavyweight (– 79.4 kg)

- Alfred Jackson

- First Round — Defeated Alfred Cleverley (NZL), points
- Quarterfinals — Lost to Karel Miljon (HOL), points

Men's Heavyweight (+ 79.4 kg)

- Joseph Goyder

- First Round — Lost to Sam Olij (HOL), points

== Cycling ==
12 cyclists, all men, represented Great Britain in 1928.

Individual road race

- Frank Southall
- Jack Lauterwasser
- John Middleton
- Charles Marshall

Team road race

- Frank Southall
- Jack Lauterwasser
- John Middleton
- Charles Marshall

Sprint

- Syd Cozens

Time trial

- Ted Kerridge

Tandem

- Jack Sibbit
- Ernest Chambers

Team pursuit

- Harry Wyld
- Lew Wyld
- Percy Wyld
- George Southall

== Fencing ==
19 fencers, 16 men and 3 women, represented Great Britain in 1928.

Men's foil

- Thomas Wand-Tetley
- Denis Pearce
- Robert Montgomerie

Men's team foil

- Thomas Wand-Tetley, Robert Montgomerie, Frederick Sherriff, Denis Pearce, Charles Simey, Jack James

Men's épée

- Charles Biscoe
- Bertie Childs
- Martin Holt

Men's team épée

- Charles Biscoe, Bertie Childs, David Drury, Martin Holt

Men's sabre

- Edward Brookfield
- Guy Harry
- Barry Notley

Men's team sabre

- Edward Brookfield, Archie Corble, Alex Forrest, Guy Harry, Robin Jeffreys, Barry Notley

Women's foil

- Muriel Freeman
- Gladys Daniell
- Peggy Butler

== Modern pentathlon ==
Three male pentathletes represented Great Britain in 1928.

- David Turquand-Young
- Alfred Goodwin
- Lance East

== Rowing ==
- Single scull - David Collet - Bronze
- Double scull - Humphrey Boardman, Denis Guye - Did not start
- Coxless pair - Terence O'Brien, Robert Nisbet -Silver
- Coxless four John Lander, Michael Warriner, Richard Beesly and Edward Vaughan Bevan - Gold
- Coxed four Harold Ives, L G Potter, George Beaumont, O B Starkey and Arthur Sulley - Round 1 - Seventh
- Eight - crew from Thames Rowing Club comprising Jamie Hamilton, Guy Oliver Nickalls, John Badcock, Donald Gollan, Harold Lane, Gordon Killick, Jack Beresford, Harold West and Arthur Sulley

== Swimming ==
Men

Athlete	Event	Heat		Semifinal		Final	
Athlete	Event	Time	Rank	Time	Rank	Time	Rank
Norman Brooks	100 m freestyle	1:03.4		Did not advance			
Reginald Sutton	100 m freestyle	1:04.0		Did not advance			
Jack Hatfield	400 m freestyle	5:32.8		DNS		Did not advance	
Arthur Watts	400 m freestyle	Unknown		Did not advance			
John Besford	100 m backstroke	1:15.0		1:14.8		1:15.4	6
Willie Francis	100 m backstroke	1:16.4		Unknown		Did not advance	
Reginald Flint	200 m breaststroke	Unknown		Did not advance			
Hugh Smith	200 m breaststroke	Unknown		Did not advance			
Edward Peter; Joseph Whiteside; Reginald Sutton; Albert Dickin	4 × 200 m freestyle relay	—		10:16.6		10:15.8	6

Women

Athlete	Event	Heat		Semifinal		Final	
Athlete	Event	Time	Rank	Time	Rank	Time	Rank
Joyce Cooper	100 m freestyle	1:16.8		1:14.0		1:13.6	3rd place, bronze medalist(s)
Jean McDowell	100 m freestyle	1:14.0		1:15.6		1:13.8	4
Iris Tanner	100 m freestyle	1:26.4		1:04.8		Did not advance	
Edith Mayne	400 m freestyle	6:10.4		Unknown		Did not advance	
Cissie Stewart	400 m freestyle	6:12.3		6:06.4		6:07.0	4
Iris Tanner	400 m freestyle	6:11.0		6:09.0		6:11.6	6
Joyce Cooper	100 m backstroke	1:24.2		—		1:22.8	3rd place, bronze medalist(s)
Phyllis Harding	100 m backstroke	1:27.8		—		Did not advance	
Ellen King	100 m backstroke	1:22.0 =WR		—		1:22.2	2nd place, silver medalist(s)
Dora Gibbs	200 m breaststroke	Unknown		Did not advance			
Mabel Hamblen	200 m breaststroke	Unknown		Did not advance			
Margery Hinton	200 m breaststroke	Unknown		Did not advance			
Joyce Cooper; Iris Tanner; Cissie Stewart; Ellen King	4 × 100 m freestyle relay	—		5:16.6		5:02.8	2nd place, silver medalist(s)
