= 1927 European Rowing Championships =

- Venue: Lake Como
- Location: Lombardy region, Italy

The 1927 European Rowing Championships were rowing championships held on Lake Como in the Italian Lombardy region. The competition was for men only and they competed in all seven Olympic boat classes (M1x, M2x, M2-, M2+, M4-, M4+, M8+).

== Medal summary ==
| Event | Gold | | Silver | | Bronze | |
|---|---|---|---|---|---|---|
| Event | Country & rowers | Time | Country & rowers | Time | Country & rowers | Time |
| M1x | Italy; Michelangelo Bernasconi | | Hungary; Béla Szendey | | Czechoslovakia; Josef Straka | |
| M2x | Switzerland; Rudolf Bosshard; Maurice Rieder | | Italy; Michelangelo Bernasconi; Alessandro de Col | | Belgium; Edmond van Parys; Adolphe Schnaphauf | |
| M2- | Italy; Renzo Vestrini; Pier Luigi Vestrini | | Switzerland; Alois Reinhard; Willy Siegenthaler | | Netherlands; Hein van Suylekom; Carel van Wankum | |
| M2+ | Italy; Renzo Vestrini; Pier Luigi Vestrini; Cesare Milani (cox) | | Switzerland; Edouard Schädeli; Willy Müller; Paul Wirz (cox) | | Netherlands; Dirk Fortuin; Jo Brandsma; L. Janus (cox) | |
| M4- | Italy; Palmino Lago; Agostino Massa; Andrea Cattoni; Giuseppe Maggio | 7'17 "3/5 | Switzerland; Theodor Stauffer; Max Balmer; Arnold Schenk; Reinhard Wildbolz | 7'22" 4/5 | (Note: The source does not specify whether there were only two teams or whether the bronze medal winner is missing from the results list) | |
| M4+ | Italy; Antonio Ghiardello; Mario Ghiardello; Giovanni-Battista Pastine; Andrea Ghiardello; Ugo Giangrande (cox) | | Switzerland; Karl Schöchlin; Hans Schöchlin; Paul Käser; Julien Comtesse; Theophil Mosimann (cox) | | Belgium; Robert Swartelé; Maurice Swartelé; Theo Wambeke; Alphonse De Wette | |
| M8+ | Italy; Medardo Lamberti; Arturo Moroni; Vittore Stocchi; Guglielmo Carubbi; Amilcare Canevari; Medardo Galli; Giulio Lamberti; Benedetto Borella; Angelo Polledri (cox) | | Switzerland; Alois Reinhard; Josef Zimmermann; Ernst Haas; Hans Kappeler; G. Inglin; Hans Zimmermann; Kaspar Zimmermann; Willy Siegenthaler; Walter Ludin (cox) | | Poland; Jan Niezabitowski; Jerzy Proczobut; Józef Łaszewski; Janusz Ślązak; Marian Wodziański; Andrzej Sołtan-Pereświat; Piotr Kurnicki; Otto Gordziałkowski; Emil Czaplinski (cox) | |
