= Jeandet =

Jeandet is a French surname. Notable people with the surname include:

- Cristian Jeandet (born 1975), Argentine footballer
- Édouard Jeandet, French rower
- Louis Jeandet, French rower

== See also ==
- Victor Muffat-Jeandet (born 1989), French alpine skier
