= Berthet =

Berthet is a French surname that may refer to

- Élie Berthet, (1815–1891), French novelist
- Georges Berthet, (1903–1979), French Olympic skier
- Gwenaël Berthet (born 1970), French Olympic sailor
- Jean-François Berthet (born 1969), French Olympic sailor, brother of Gwenaël
- Joseph Berthet, French Olympic rower
- Lola Berthet, (born 1980), Argentine actress
- Marcel Berthet (1888–1953), French cyclist
- Marius Berthet, French Olympic rower
- Raymond Berthet (1909–1979), French Olympic cross-country skier, brother of Georges
- Rémi Berthet (born 1947), French Olympic judoka
- Sébastien Berthet, (born 1978), French professional ice hockey player
- Vincent Berthet (born 1960), French Olympic equestrian

== See also ==
- Villa Berthet, town in Chaco Province, Argentina
