= James Workman =

James Workman may refer to:

- James Workman (rower) (1908–1983), American rower
- James Workman (writer) (1912–2001), Australian actor and writer
- James Workman, Scottish painter, brother of John Workman (painter)
- Jimmy Workman (born 1980), American retired child actor
