= 1930 European Rowing Championships =

- Venue: Meuse
- Location: Liège, Belgium

The 1930 European Rowing Championships were rowing championships held on the Meuse in the Belgian city of Liège. The competition was for men only and they competed in all seven Olympic boat classes (M1x, M2x, M2-, M2+, M4-, M4+, M8+).

== Medal summary ==
Event	Gold		Silver		Bronze	
Event	Country & rowers	Time	Country & rowers	Time	Country & rowers	Time
M1x	Hungary; Béla Szendey		Italy; Vincenzo Giacomini		Denmark; Arnold Schwartz	
M2x	Switzerland; Helmut von Bidder; Hans Hottinger		Italy; Michelangelo Bernasconi; Alessandro de Col		Netherlands; Constant Pieterse; Han Cox	
M2-	Poland; Henryk Budziński; Jan Mikołajczak		Hungary; Gusztav Götz; Tibor Machan		France; Gaston Marchal; Fernand Vandernotte	
M2+	Italy; Arturo Moroni; Guglielmo Carubbi; Angelo Polledri (cox)		France; Louis Draville; Jean Cottez; Blondiau (cox)		Switzerland; Erwin Allemann; Marcel Heitsch; Julien Cotts (cox)	
M4-	Italy; Cesare Rossi; Pietro Freschi; Umberto Bonadè; Paolo Gennari		Switzerland; Karl Schöchlin; Hans Schöchlin; Paul Käser; Hans Niklaus		Belgium; León Vandooren; Gaston Feys; Jean Vain; Walter Vergin	
M4+	Denmark; Aage Hansen; Christian Olsen; Walther Christiansen; Richard Olsen; Poul Richardt (cox)		Italy; Francesco Chicco; Renato Felluga; Nicolò Vittori; Valerio Perentin; Renato Petronio (cox)		Netherlands; P.S. Heerema; E.E.J. Weber; W.E.F. Winckel; G. Slotboom; N. Slotboom (cox)	
M8+	United States; Charles McIlvaine; John Bratten; John McNichol; Myrlin Janes; Joe Dougherty; Dan Barrow; George Chester; Surner; Thomas Mack (cox)		Italy; Vittorio Cioni; Enrico Garzelli; Guglielmo Del Bimbo; Roberto Vestrini; Dino Barsotti; Eugenio Nenci; Mario Balleri; Renato Barbieri; Cesare Milani (cox)		Denmark; Willy Sørensen; Knud Olsen; Sören Neegaard; Ove Zøllner; Bernhardt Møller Sørensen; Willy Kruse; Ernst Friborg Jensen; Carl Schmidt; Harry Gregersen (cox)	
