= Armin Meier =

Armin Meier may refer to:

- Armin Meier (cyclist)
- Armin Meier (actor)
- Armin Meier (politician)

== See also ==
- Armin Maier, footballer
- Armin Meyer, Argentine rower
- Armin H. Meyer, American diplomat
