= Alessandro de Col =

Italian rower

Sport
- Sport: Rowing
Medal record
Men's rowing
Representing Italy
European Rowing Championships
| Silver medal – second place | 1926 Lucerne | Double scull |
| Silver medal – second place | 1927 Como | Double scull |
| Silver medal – second place | 1929 Bydgoszcz | Double scull |
| Silver medal – second place | 1930 Liège | Double scull |

Alessandro de Col was an Italian rower. He won four silver medals at European Rowing Championships between 1926 and 1930 in the double scull, all while teamed up with Michelangelo Bernasconi.
