= Polledri =

Polledri is an Italian surname. Notable people with the surname include:

- Angelo Polledri (1904–1997), Italian rower
- Claudio Polledri (born 1936), Swiss fencer
- Jake Polledri (born 1995), English-born Italian rugby union footballer
