= Béla Szendey =

Hungarian rower

Personal information
- Born: 5 October 1902 Budapest, Hungary
- Died: 29 October 1966 (aged 64)

Sport
- Sport: Rowing
Medal record
Men's rowing
Representing Hungary
European Rowing Championships
Silver medal – second place	1926 Lucerne	Single sculls
Silver medal – second place	1927 Como	Single sculls
Gold medal – first place	1930 Liège	Single sculls
Silver medal – second place	1931 Paris	Double sculls
Bronze medal – third place	1933 Budapest	Double sculls

Béla Szendey (5 October 1902 – 29 October 1966) was a Hungarian rower.

Szendey was born in Budapest in 1902. He competed at the 1924 Summer Olympics in Paris with Ervin Mórich in the men's double sculls where they were eliminated in round one. He competed in single sculls and won silver medals at the 1926 European Rowing Championships in Lucerne and at the 1927 European Rowing Championships in Como. At the 1928 Summer Olympics in Amsterdam, he was eliminated in the round two repêchage by David Collet from Great Britain in the single sculls event.

Szendey won gold at the 1930 European Rowing Championships in Liège in the single sculls. He teamed up with András Szendey for the 1931 European Rowing Championships in Paris and they won a silver medal in double sculls. They won a bronze medal in this boat class two years later at the 1933 European Rowing Championships in Budapest.

Szendey died on 29 October 1966 in Budapest and was interred at Farkasréti Cemetery.
