= Rowing at the 1928 Summer Olympics – Men's eight =

Men's eight at the Games of the IX Olympiad
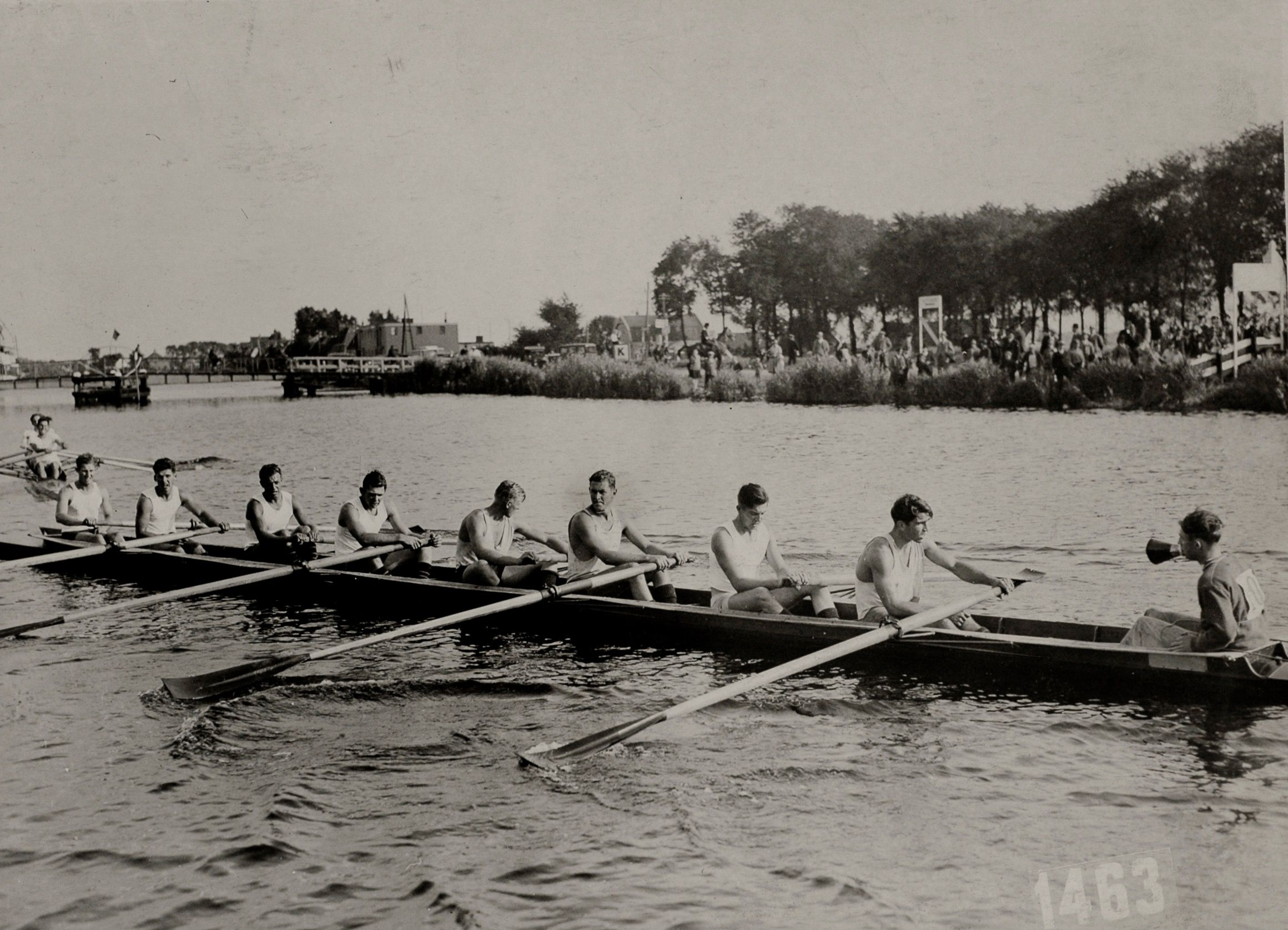
- Winning American men's eight team at the 1928 Olympics
- Venue: Sloten
- Dates: 2–10 August 1928
- Competitors: 99 from 11 nations
- Winning time: 6:03.2

Medalists
1st place, gold medalist(s)		United States: Marvin Stalder; John Brinck; Francis Frederick; William Thompson; William Dally; James Workman; Hubert A. Caldwell; Peter Donlon; Donald Blessing (cox)
2nd place, silver medalist(s)		Great Britain: Jamie Hamilton; Guy Oliver Nickalls; John Badcock; Donald Gollan; Harold Lane; Gordon Killick; Jack Beresford; Harold West; Arthur Sulley (cox)
3rd place, bronze medalist(s)		Canada: Frederick Hedges; Frank Fiddes; John Hand; Herbert Richardson; Jack Murdoch; Athol Meech; Edgar Norris; William Ross; John Donnelly (cox)

The men's eight event was part of the rowing programme at the 1928 Summer Olympics. It was one of seven rowing events for men and was the seventh appearance of the event, which had been on the programme for every Olympic Games since rowing was added in 1900. It was held from 2 to 10 August 1928. There were 11 boats (99 competitors) from 11 nations, with each nation limited to a single boat in the event. The event was won by the United States, the third consecutive victory for the Americans in the event and fifth overall (winning every time the team competed). Great Britain returned to the podium after a one-Games absence in 1924 broke a three-Games medal streak, taking silver this time. Defending silver medalists Canada took bronze.

== Background ==
This was the seventh appearance of the event. Rowing had been on the programme in 1896 but was cancelled due to bad weather. The men's eight has been held every time that rowing has been contested, beginning in 1900.

Great Britain and the United States were the dominant nations in the event, with the nations winning all six prior Olympic men's eight competitions between them. The United States held a 4–2 edge and the reigning crown (two times in a row). They were represented this time by the University of California, Berkeley (the United States) and the Thames Rowing Club (Great Britain). The Thames club had won the Grand Challenge Cup at Henley in 1927 and 1928.

Denmark and Poland each made their debut in the event. Belgium, Canada, France, Great Britain, and the United States each made their fifth appearance, tied for most among nations to that point.

== Competition format ==
The "eight" event featured nine-person boats, with eight rowers and a coxswain. It was a sweep rowing event, with the rowers each having one oar (and thus each rowing on one side). The course used the 2000 metres distance that became the Olympic standard in 1912.

The 1928 competition expanded the repechage system introduced in 1924, giving losing rowers a second chance at advancement. However, the number of rowers in each race was once again limited to two. These changes led to the tournament having a total of seven rounds (five main rounds and two repechages).

- The first round had 11 boats in 6 heats, with one of the boats having a bye and the other 10 competing one-on-one. The winner of each heat (6 total boats) advanced to the second round, while the loser (5 boats) went to the first repechage.
- The first repechage had 5 boats. They were placed in 3 heats, one of which was a walkover. The winner of each advanced to the second round while the loser was eliminated. Rowers advancing via the first repechage had a continuing disadvantage to those who advanced directly from the first round, as they were not eligible for the second repechage.
- The second round had 9 boats, with 8 competing in 4 heats and a fifth heat being a walkover. Winners (5 total) advanced to the quarterfinals, while losers went to the second repechage (if they had advanced directly from the first round) or were eliminated (if they had already been through the first repechage).
- The second repechage had 2 boats, competing in a single heat. The winner advanced to the quarterfinals, with the loser eliminated.
- The quarterfinals were the first round without a repechage. Six boats had advanced to the quarterfinals; they competed in 3 heats, with winners advancing to the semifinals and losers eliminated.
- The semifinals placed the 3 boats in 2 heats, one of which was a walkover. Winners advanced to the final, with the loser receiving the bronze medal.
- The final round consisted of a single final (for gold and silver).

== Schedule ==
Date	Time	Round
Thursday, 2 August 1928		Round 1
Friday, 3 August 1928		First repechage
Saturday, 4 August 1928		Round 2
Monday, 6 August 1928		Second repechage
Tuesday, 7 August 1928		Quarterfinals
Wednesday, 8 August 1928		Semifinals
Friday, 10 August 1928		Final

== Results ==
Source: Official results; De Wael

=== Round 1 ===
Winners advanced to the second round. Losers competed in the first repechage.

==== Round 1 heat 1 ====
Rank	Rowers	Coxswain	Nation	Time	Notes
1	Frederick Hedges; Frank Fiddes; John Hand; Herbert Richardson; Jack Murdoch; Athol Meech; Edgar Norris; William Ross	John Donnelly	Canada	6:29.8	Q
2	Svend Aage Grønvold; Georg Sjøht; Bernhardt Møller Sørensen; Sigfred Sørensen; Ernst Friborg Jensen; Carl Schmidt; Willy Sørensen; Knud Olsen	Harry Gregersen	Denmark	6:35.6	R

==== Round 1 heat 2 ====
Rank	Rowers	Coxswain	Nation	Time	Notes
1	Otto Gordziałkowski; Stanisław Urban; Andrzej Sołtan-Pereświat; Marian Wodziański; Janusz Ślązak; Wacław Michalski; Józef Łaszewski; Henryk Niezabitowski	Jerzy Skolimowski	Poland	6:37.0	Q
2	Daan Ferman; Teun Beijnen; Jan Huges; Tjallie James; Appel Ooiman; Jaap Stenger; Hans Kruyt; Guus van Ditzhuyzen	Koos Schouwenaar	Netherlands	6:42.8	R

==== Round 1 heat 3 ====
Rank	Rowers	Coxswain	Nation	Time	Notes
1	Karl Aletter; Ernst Gaber; Wilhelm Reichert; Erwin Hoffstätter; Hermann Herbold; Gustav Maier; Robert Huber; Hans Maier	Fritz Bauer	Germany	6:33.0	Q
2	Joseph Vuillard; Marius Berthet; Louis Jeandet; Édouard Jeandet; Charles Massonnat; François Thonin; Joseph Berthet; Marius Gervasoni	Alphonse Margailland	France	6:44.8	R

==== Round 1 heat 4 ====
Rank	Rowers	Coxswain	Nation	Time	Notes
1	Marvin Stalder; John Brinck; Francis Frederick; William Thompson; William Dally; James Workman; Hubert A. Caldwell; Peter Donlon	Donald Blessing	United States	6:21.2	Q
2	Jacques Van Malderen; Marcel Roman; Henri Micha; Jean Jonlet; Auguste Lambrecht; Armand Lemaire; Victor Denis; René Macors	Georges Anthony	Belgium	6:47.0	R

==== Round 1 heat 5 ====
Rank	Rowers	Coxswain	Nation	Time	Notes
1	Jamie Hamilton; Guy Oliver Nickalls; John Badcock; Donald Gollan; Harold Lane; Gordon Killick; Jack Beresford; Harold West	Arthur Sulley	Great Britain	6:22.0	Q
2	Medardo Lamberti; Arturo Moroni; Vittore Stocchi; Guglielmo Carubbi; Amilcare Canevari; Medardo Galli; Giulio Lamberti; Benedetto Borella	Angelo Polledri	Italy	6:24.6	R

==== Round 1 heat 6 ====
Rank	Rowers	Coxswain	Nation	Time	Notes
1	Ernesto Black; Pedro Brise; Armin Meyer; Lázaro Iturrieta; Federico Probst; Leonel Sutton; Irving Bond; Gustavo Lanusse	Alberto Errecalde	Argentina	7:10.0	Q

=== First repechage ===
Winners advanced to the second round, but were ineligible for a second repechage if they lost there. Losers were eliminated.

==== First repechage heat 1 ====
Rank	Rowers	Coxswain	Nation	Time	Notes
1	Daan Ferman; Teun Beijnen; Jan Huges; Tjallie James; Appel Ooiman; Jaap Stenger; Hans Kruyt; Guus van Ditzhuyzen	Koos Schouwenaar	Netherlands	6:47.4	Q
2	Jacques Van Malderen; Marcel Roman; Henri Micha; Jean Jonlet; Auguste Lambrecht; Armand Lemaire; Victor Denis; René Macors	Georges Anthony	Belgium	6:47.8	

==== First repechage heat 2 ====
Rank	Rowers	Coxswain	Nation	Time	Notes
1	Medardo Lamberti; Arturo Moroni; Vittore Stocchi; Guglielmo Carubbi; Amilcare Canevari; Medardo Galli; Giulio Lamberti; Benedetto Borella	Angelo Polledri	Italy	6:37.8	Q
2	Joseph Vuillard; Marius Berthet; Louis Jeandet; Édouard Jeandet; Charles Massonnat; François Thonin; Joseph Berthet; Marius Gervasoni	Alphonse Margailland	France	6:50.8	

==== First repechage heat 3 ====
Rank	Rowers	Coxswain	Nation	Time	Notes
1	Svend Aage Grønvold; Georg Sjøht; Bernhardt Møller Sørensen; Sigfred Sørensen; Ernst Friborg Jensen; Carl Schmidt; Willy Sørensen; Knud Olsen	Harry Gregersen	Denmark	6:53.2	Q

=== Round 2 ===
Winners advanced to the third round. Losers competed in the second repechage, if they had advanced by winning in the first round, or were eliminated if they had advanced through the first repechage.

==== Round 2 heat 1 ====
Rank	Rowers	Coxswain	Nation	Time	Notes
1	Marvin Stalder; John Brinck; Francis Frederick; William Thompson; William Dally; James Workman; Hubert A. Caldwell; Peter Donlon	Donald Blessing	United States	6:35.0	Q
2	Svend Aage Grønvold; Georg Sjøht; Bernhardt Møller Sørensen; Sigfred Sørensen; Ernst Friborg Jensen; Carl Schmidt; Willy Sørensen; Knud Olsen	Harry Gregersen	Denmark	6:48.4	

==== Round 2 heat 2 ====
Rank	Rowers	Coxswain	Nation	Time	Notes
1	Karl Aletter; Ernst Gaber; Wilhelm Reichert; Erwin Hoffstätter; Hermann Herbold; Gustav Maier; Robert Huber; Hans Maier	Fritz Bauer	Germany	6:31.6	Q
2	Ernesto Black; Pedro Brise; Armin Meyer; Lázaro Iturrieta; Federico Probst; Leonel Sutton; Irving Bond; Gustavo Lanusse	Alberto Errecalde	Argentina	6:53.4	R

==== Round 2 heat 3 ====
Rank	Rowers	Coxswain	Nation	Time	Notes
1	Jamie Hamilton; Guy Oliver Nickalls; John Badcock; Donald Gollan; Harold Lane; Gordon Killick; Jack Beresford; Harold West	Arthur Sulley	Great Britain	6:30.6	Q
2	Otto Gordziałkowski; Stanisław Urban; Andrzej Sołtan-Pereświat; Marian Wodziański; Janusz Ślązak; Wacław Michalski; Józef Łaszewski; Henryk Niezabitowski	Jerzy Skolimowski	Poland	6:43.2	R

==== Round 2 heat 4 ====
Rank	Rowers	Coxswain	Nation	Time	Notes
1	Medardo Lamberti; Arturo Moroni; Vittore Stocchi; Guglielmo Carubbi; Amilcare Canevari; Medardo Galli; Giulio Lamberti; Benedetto Borella	Angelo Polledri	Italy	6:54.0	Q
2	Daan Ferman; Teun Beijnen; Jan Huges; Tjallie James; Appel Ooiman; Jaap Stenger; Hans Kruyt; Guus van Ditzhuyzen	Koos Schouwenaar	Netherlands	6:59.0	

==== Round 2 heat 5 ====
Rank	Rowers	Coxswain	Nation	Time	Notes
1	Frederick Hedges; Frank Fiddes; John Hand; Herbert Richardson; Jack Murdoch; Athol Meech; Edgar Norris; William Ross	John Donnelly	Canada	6:59.0	Q

=== Second repechage ===
The winner advanced to the third round, while the loser was eliminated.

Rank	Rowers	Coxswain	Nation	Time	Notes
1	Otto Gordziałkowski; Stanisław Urban; Andrzej Sołtan-Pereświat; Marian Wodziański; Janusz Ślązak; Wacław Michalski; Józef Łaszewski; Henryk Niezabitowski	Jerzy Skolimowski	Poland	6:24.6	Q
2	Ernesto Black; Pedro Brise; Armin Meyer; Lázaro Iturrieta; Federico Probst; Leonel Sutton; Irving Bond; Gustavo Lanusse	Alberto Errecalde	Argentina	6:33.0	

=== Quarterfinals ===
The competition became single-elimination from this point, with losers being eliminated even if they had not previously had to advance through a repechage.

==== Quarterfinal 1 ====
Rank	Rowers	Coxswain	Nation	Time	Notes
1	Frederick Hedges; Frank Fiddes; John Hand; Herbert Richardson; Jack Murdoch; Athol Meech; Edgar Norris; William Ross	John Donnelly	Canada	6:37.4	Q
2	Otto Gordziałkowski; Stanisław Urban; Andrzej Sołtan-Pereświat; Marian Wodziański; Janusz Ślązak; Wacław Michalski; Józef Łaszewski; Henryk Niezabitowski	Jerzy Skolimowski	Poland	6:42.2	

==== Quarterfinal 2 ====
Rank	Rowers	Coxswain	Nation	Time	Notes
1	Jamie Hamilton; Guy Oliver Nickalls; John Badcock; Donald Gollan; Harold Lane; Gordon Killick; Jack Beresford; Harold West	Arthur Sulley	Great Britain	6:34.2	Q
2	Karl Aletter; Ernst Gaber; Wilhelm Reichert; Erwin Hoffstätter; Hermann Herbold; Gustav Maier; Robert Huber; Hans Maier	Fritz Bauer	Germany	6:42.8	

==== Quarterfinal 3 ====
Rank	Rowers	Coxswain	Nation	Time	Notes
1	Marvin Stalder; John Brinck; Francis Frederick; William Thompson; William Dally; James Workman; Hubert A. Caldwell; Peter Donlon	Donald Blessing	United States	6:32.8	Q
2	Medardo Lamberti; Arturo Moroni; Vittore Stocchi; Guglielmo Carubbi; Amilcare Canevari; Medardo Galli; Giulio Lamberti; Benedetto Borella	Angelo Polledri	Italy	6:44.4	

=== Semifinals ===
Great Britain advanced uncontested to the final, and was joined by the United States after the United States won the only semifinal against Canada. Canada received the bronze medal.

==== Semifinal 1 ====
Rank	Rowers	Coxswain	Nation	Time	Notes
1	Marvin Stalder; John Brinck; Francis Frederick; William Thompson; William Dally; James Workman; Hubert A. Caldwell; Peter Donlon	Donald Blessing	United States	6:02.0	Q
2 ( (bronze) )	Frederick Hedges; Frank Fiddes; John Hand; Herbert Richardson; Jack Murdoch; Athol Meech; Edgar Norris; William Ross	John Donnelly	Canada	6:03.8	

==== Semifinal 2 ====
Rank	Rowers	Coxswain	Nation	Time	Notes
1	Jamie Hamilton; Guy Oliver Nickalls; John Badcock; Donald Gollan; Harold Lane; Gordon Killick; Jack Beresford; Harold West	Arthur Sulley	Great Britain	6:23.6	Q

=== Final ===
Rank	Rowers	Coxswain	Nation	Time
1st place, gold medalist(s)	Marvin Stalder; John Brinck; Francis Frederick; William Thompson; William Dally; James Workman; Hubert A. Caldwell; Peter Donlon	Donald Blessing	United States	6:03.2
2nd place, silver medalist(s)	Jamie Hamilton; Guy Oliver Nickalls; John Badcock; Donald Gollan; Harold Lane; Gordon Killick; Jack Beresford; Harold West	Arthur Sulley	Great Britain	6:05.6
