= Medardo Galli =

Italian rower (1907–1985)

Personal information
- Born: 6 April 1907 Piacenza, Italy
- Died: 18 October 1985 (aged 78)

Sport
- Sport: Rowing
- Club: SC Vittorino da Feltre, Piacenza
Medal record
Men's rowing
Representing Italy
European Rowing Championships
Gold medal – first place	1927 Como	Eight

Medardo Galli (6 April 1907 – 18 October 1985) was an Italian rower. He competed at the 1928 Summer Olympics in Amsterdam with the men's eight where they were eliminated in the quarter-final.
