= Hans Kruyt =

Dutch rower (1907–1988)

Personal information
- Born: Henri Eli Kruyt; 27 June 1907 Banda Aceh, Indonesia
- Died: 22 November 1988 (aged 81) The Hague, Netherlands

Sport
- Sport: Rowing
- Club: Laga, Delft
Medal record
Men's rowing
Representing the Netherlands
European Rowing Championships
Gold medal – first place	1926 Lucerne	Eight

Henri Eli Kruyt (27 June 1907 – 22 November 1988) was a Dutch rower. He competed at the 1928 Summer Olympics in Amsterdam with the men's eight where they were eliminated in round two.
