= Auguste Lambrecht =

Belgian rower

Personal information
- Full name: Auguste Lambrecht Jr.
- Nationality: Belgian
- Born: 6 September 1905
- Died: 25 July 1986 (aged 80)

Sport
- Sport: Rowing

Auguste Lambrecht Jr. (6 September 1905 – 25 July 1986) was a Belgian rower. He competed in the men's eight event at the 1928 Summer Olympics.
