= Giulio Lamberti =

Italian rower (1895–1985)

Personal information
- Born: 16 December 1895 Piacenza, Italy
- Died: 24 December 1985 (aged 90) Piacenza, Italy

Sport
- Sport: Rowing
- Club: SC Vittorino da Feltre, Piacenza
Medal record
Men's rowing
Representing Italy
European Rowing Championships
Gold medal – first place	1927 Como	Eight

Giulio Lamberti (16 December 1895 – 24 December 1985) was an Italian rower. He competed at the 1928 Summer Olympics in Amsterdam with the men's eight where they were eliminated in the quarter-final.
