= Jaap Stenger =

Dutch rower

Personal information
- Nationality: Dutch
- Born: 4 July 1907; Delft, Netherlands
- Died: 16 May 1992 (aged 84); The Hague, Netherlands

Sport
- Sport: Rowing

Jaap Stenger (4 July 1907 – 16 May 1992) was a Dutch rower. He competed in the men's eight event at the 1928 Summer Olympics.
