= Wilhelm Reichert =

German rower (b. 1896. d. unknown)

Personal information
- Nationality: German
- Born: 31 March 1896; Addis Ababa, Ethiopia

Sport
- Sport: Rowing

Wilhelm Reichert (born 31 March 1896, date of death unknown) was a German rower. He competed in the men's eight event at the 1928 Summer Olympics.
