= Henryk Niezabitowski =

Polish rower

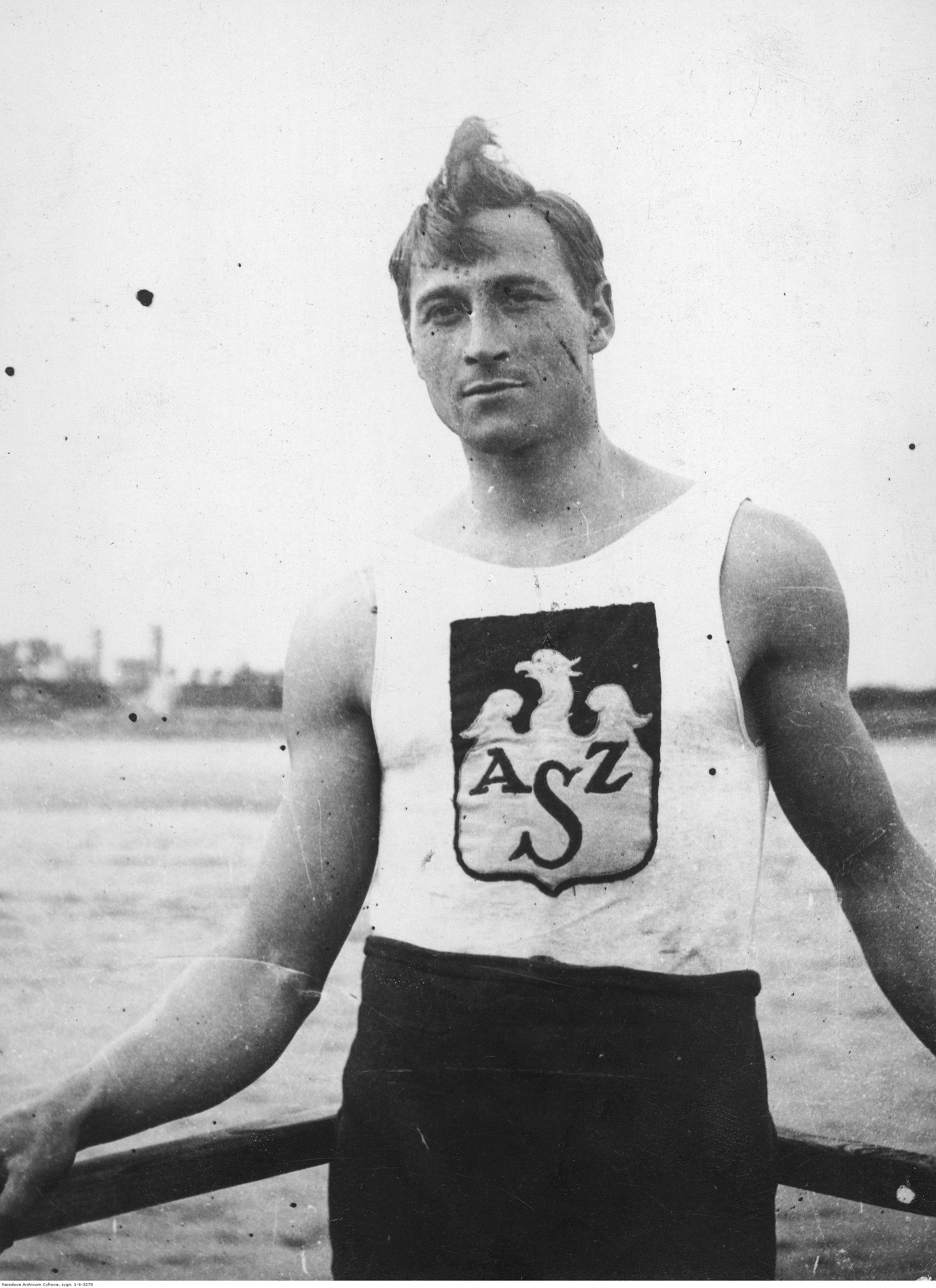
- Henryk Niezabitowski in the 1920s

Personal information
- Nationality: Polish
- Born: 26 December 1896 Warsaw, Russian Empire
- Died: 26 June 1976 (aged 79) Radom, Poland

Sport
- Sport: Rowing

Henryk Niezabitowski (26 December 1896 – 26 June 1976) was a Polish rower. He competed in the men's eight event at the 1928 Summer Olympics.
