= Georg Sjøht =

Danish rower

Personal information
- Nationality: Danish
- Born: 21 June 1901 Copenhagen, Denmark
- Died: June 21, 1942 (aged 41) Argentina

Sport
- Sport: Rowing

Georg Sjøht (21 June 1901 – 21 June 1942) was a Danish rower. He competed in the men's eight event at the 1928 Summer Olympics.
