= Gustav Maier =

German rower

Personal information
- Full name: Gustav Heinrich Nicolaus Maier
- Nationality: German
- Born: 15 December 1906; Mannheim, Germany

Sport
- Sport: Rowing

Gustav Maier (born 15 December 1906, date of death unknown) was a German rower. He competed in the men's eight event at the 1928 Summer Olympics.
