= Daan Ferman =

Dutch rower

Personal information
- Nationality: Dutch
- Born: 16 April 1909; Kraguman, Dutch East Indies
- Died: 23 February 1969 (aged 59); Slikkerveer, Netherlands

Sport
- Sport: Rowing

Daan Ferman (16 April 1909 – 23 February 1969) was a Dutch rower. He competed in the men's eight event at the 1928 Summer Olympics.
