= Alberto Errecalde =

Argentine rower

Personal information
- Nationality: Argentine
- Born: 6 March 1890
- Died: Unknown

Sport
- Sport: Rowing

Alberto Errecalde (born 6 March 1890, date of death unknown) was an Argentine rower. He competed in the men's eight event at the 1928 Summer Olympics.
