= Amilcare Canevari =

Italian rower

Personal information
- Born: 9 June 1905 Piacenza, Italy
- Died: 1 August 1987 (aged 82) Piacenza, Italy

Sport
- Sport: Rowing
- Club: SC Vittorino da Feltre, Piacenza
Medal record
Men's rowing
Representing Italy
European Rowing Championships
Gold medal – first place	1927 Como	Eight

Amilcare Canevari (9 June 1905 – 1 August 1987) was an Italian rower. He competed at the 1928 Summer Olympics in Amsterdam with the men's eight where they were eliminated in the quarter-final.
