= Janusz Ślązak =

Polish rower (1907–1985)

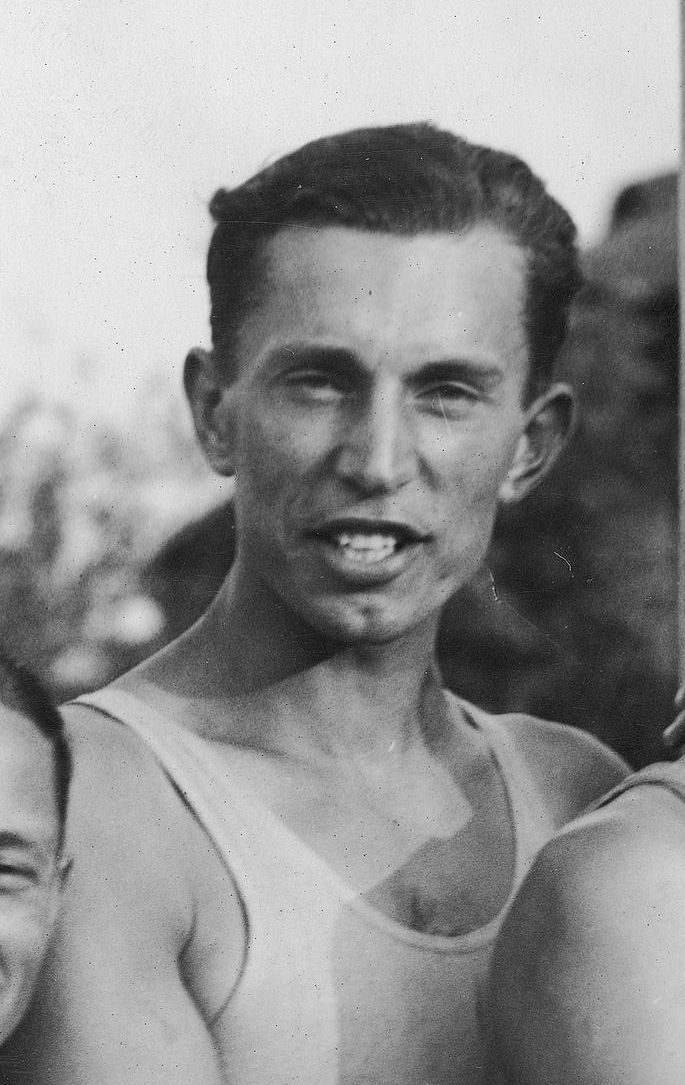
- Ślązak in 1932

Personal information
- Born: Janusz Lubomir Ślązak; 20 March 1907 Warsaw, Congress Poland, Russian Empire
- Died: 24 February 1985 (aged 77) Warsaw, Polish People’s Republic
- Height: 191 cm (6 ft 3 in)
- Weight: 95 kg (209 lb)

Sport
- Sport: Rowing
- Club: AZS Warszawa; WTW, Warszawa
Medal record
Men's rowing
Representing Poland
Olympic Games
Silver medal – second place	1932 Los Angeles	Coxed pair
Bronze medal – third place	1932 Los Angeles	Coxed four
European Rowing Championships
Bronze medal – third place	1927 Como	Eight
Silver medal – second place	1933 Budapest	Coxed pair

Janusz Lubomir Ślązak (20 March 1907 – 24 February 1985) was a Polish rower who competed in the 1928 Summer Olympics, in the 1932 Summer Olympics, and in the 1936 Summer Olympics.

In 1928 he was part of the Polish boat which finished fourth in the eight event after being eliminated in the quarter-finals.

Four years later he won the silver medal as member of the Polish boat in the coxed pairs competition as well as the bronze medal as member of the Polish boat in the coxed fours competition.

In 1936 he was part of the Polish boat which was eliminated in the repechage of the coxed pair event.

Ślązak fought in Poland's defense during the German invasion of Poland, which started World War II in September 1939. Afterwards, he was held by the Germans in the Oflag II-C prisoner-of-war camp.

He was born and died in Warsaw.

Olympic Games
Preceded by Marian Cieniewski	Flagbearer for Poland; 1932 Los Angeles	Succeeded by Klemens Biniakowski
