= Willy Sørensen =

Danish rower (1904–1981)

Personal information
- Born: Willy Nicolaj Holm-Sørensen; 3 March 1904 Frederiksberg, Denmark
- Died: 9 July 1981 (aged 77) Rødovre, Denmark

Sport
- Sport: Rowing
- Club: Københavns Roklub
Medal record
Men's rowing
Representing Denmark
European Rowing Championships
Bronze medal – third place	1930 Liège	Eight
Silver medal – second place	1934 Lucerne	Eight

Willy Nicolaj Holm-Sørensen (3 March 1904 – 9 July 1981) was a Danish rower. He competed at the 1928 Summer Olympics in Amsterdam with the men's eight where they were eliminated in round two. His brother Svend Aage Holm Sørensen was also an Olympic Athlete.
