= Helmut von Bidder =

Swiss rower

Sport
- Sport: Rowing
- Club: Basler RC
Medal record
Men's rowing
Representing Switzerland
European Rowing Championships
Gold medal – first place	1930 Liège	Double scull
Gold medal – first place	1931 Paris	Double scull
Gold medal – first place	1934 Lucerne	Double scull

Helmut von Bidder was a Swiss rower. He rowed for Basler RC. He was European champion in the double scull event with his partner Hans Hottinger in 1930, 1931, and 1934. They were Swiss champions several time. Two grandsons, Florian von Bidder (born 1973) and Lukas von Bidder (born 1976), represented Switzerland in rowing.
