= Tjallie James =

Dutch rower (1906–1983)

Personal information
- Born: Tjalling James; 24 March 1906 Surabaya, Indonesia
- Died: 9 February 1983 (aged 76) Loosdrecht, Netherlands

Sport
- Sport: Rowing
- Club: Laga, Delft
Medal record
Men's rowing
Representing the Netherlands
European Rowing Championships
| Gold medal – first place | 1926 Lucerne | Eight |

Tjalling "Tjallie" James (24 March 1906 – 9 February 1983) was a Dutch rower. He competed at the 1928 Summer Olympics in Amsterdam with the men's eight where they were eliminated in round two.
