= Sigfred Sørensen =

Danish rower

Personal information
- Born: Sigfred Christian Emil Sørensen; 16 March 1907 Copenhagen, Denmark
- Died: 19 September 1962 (aged 55) Gentofte, Denmark
- Relatives: Bernhardt Møller Sørensen (brother)

Sport
- Sport: Rowing
- Club: Københavns Roklub
Medal record
Men's rowing
Representing Denmark
European Rowing Championships
| Silver medal – second place | 1934 Lucerne | Eight |

Sigfred Christian Emil Sørensen (16 March 1907 – 19 September 1962) was a Danish rower. He competed at the 1928 Summer Olympics in Amsterdam with the men's eight where they were eliminated in round two. He rowed with his brother Bernhardt Møller Sørensen.
