= Federico Probst =

Argentine rower

Personal information
- Nationality: Argentine
- Born: 1905

Sport
- Sport: Rowing

Federico Probst (born 1905, date of death unknown) was an Argentine rower. He competed in the men's eight event at the 1928 Summer Olympics.
