= Vittore Stocchi =

Italian rower

Personal information
- Born: 12 November 1895 Piacenza, Italy
- Died: 22 August 1967 (aged 71) Piacenza, Italy

Sport
- Sport: Rowing
- Club: SC Vittorino da Feltre, Piacenza
Medal record
Men's rowing
Representing Italy
European Rowing Championships
Gold medal – first place	1927 Como	Eight

Vittore Stocchi (12 November 1895 – 22 August 1967) was an Italian rower. He competed at the 1928 Summer Olympics in Amsterdam with the men's eight where they were eliminated in the quarter-final.
