= Hamish Hamilton =

British book publishing house and Penguin Group imprint

Hamish Hamilton Limited
- Parent company: Penguin Random House
- Founded: 1931; 95 years ago
- Founder: Jamie Hamilton
- Country of origin: United Kingdom
- Headquarters location: London
- Distribution: Penguin Group
- Publication types: Books
- Official website: www.penguin.co.uk

Hamish Hamilton Limited is a publishing imprint and originally a British publishing house, founded in 1931 eponymously by the half-Scot half-American Jamie Hamilton (Hamish is the vocative form of the Gaelic Seumas [meaning James], James the English form – which was also his given name, and Jamie the diminutive form). Jamie Hamilton was often referred to as Hamish Hamilton.

The Hamish Hamilton imprint is now part of the Penguin Random House group.

== History and current publishing ==
Hamish Hamilton Limited originally specialised in fiction, and was responsible for publishing a number of American authors in the United Kingdom, including Nigel Balchin (including pseudonym: Mark Spade), Raymond Chandler, James Thurber, J. D. Salinger, E. B. White and Truman Capote.

In 1939 Hamish Hamilton Law and Hamish Hamilton Medical were started but closed during the war. Hamish Hamilton was established in the literary district of Bloomsbury and went on to publish many promising British and American authors, many of whom were personal friends and acquaintances of Jamie Hamilton.

During the late 1940s, Hamish Hamilton Limited published authors including D. W. Brogan, Albert Camus, L. P. Hartley, Nancy Mitford, Alan Moorehead, Terence Rattigan, Jean-Paul Sartre, Georges Simenon and A. J. P. Taylor.

Jamie Hamilton sold the firm in 1965 to the Thomson Organisation, who resold it to Penguin Books in 1986. In 2013, Penguin merged with Random House, making Hamish Hamilton an imprint of Penguin Random House.

Hamish Hamilton's aim remains to publish innovative literary fiction and non-fiction from around the world. Authors include: Alain de Botton, Bernardine Evaristo, Esther Freud, Toby Litt, Redmond O'Hanlon, W. G. Sebald, Zadie Smith, William Sutcliffe, R. K. Narayan, Paul Theroux and John Updike.

Hamish Hamilton also published an online literary magazine called Five Dials, which was founded in 2008 and closed 16 years later, while its full archive remain available.

== Book series ==
- Antelope Books
- Famous Regiments
- Fingerprint Books
- Hamish Hamilton Paperbacks
- The Little Golden Library - series edited by Herbert Strang. Titles include Scouting Stories (1931), True Adventure Stories (1931), Stories of Great Inventions (1932), Stories of the Sea (1933), Stories of Field and Forest (date unknown).
- Look Books
- Makers of the New World
- The Modern Library
- The Novel Library
- The "Six Great" Series
