= Robert Huber (rower) =

German rower

Personal information
- Nationality: German
- Born: 10 November 1906; Offenbach am Main, Germany
- Died: 18 August 1942 (aged 35); Russia

Sport
- Sport: Rowing

Robert Huber (10 November 1906 – 18 August 1942) was a German rower. He competed in the men's eight event at the 1928 Summer Olympics. He was killed in action during World War II.
