= Harry Gregersen =

Danish coxswain

Personal information
- Born: Einer Harry Gregersen; 7 July 1901 Holbæk, Denmark
- Died: 3 September 1970 (aged 69) Copenhagen, Denmark

Sport
- Sport: Rowing
- Club: Københavns Roklub
Medal record
Men's rowing
Representing Denmark
European Rowing Championships
| Bronze medal – third place | 1930 Liège | Eight |
| Silver medal – second place | 1934 Lucerne | Eight |

Einer Harry Gregersen (7 July 1901 – 3 September 1970) was a Danish coxswain. He competed at the 1928 Summer Olympics in Amsterdam with the men's eight where they were eliminated in round two.
