= Svend Aage Grønvold =

Danish rower (1903–1969)

Personal information
- Nationality: Danish
- Born: 13 December 1903; Copenhagen, Denmark
- Died: 8 December 1969 (aged 65); Gladsaxe, Denmark

Sport
- Sport: Rowing

Svend Aage Grønvold (13 December 1903 – 8 December 1969) was a Danish rower. He competed in the men's eight event at the 1928 Summer Olympics.
