= Medardo Lamberti =

Italian rower (1890–1986)

Personal information
- Born: 29 June 1890 Piacenza, Italy
- Died: 21 March 1986 (aged 95) Piacenza, Italy

Sport
- Sport: Rowing
- Club: SC Vittorino da Feltre, Piacenza
Medal record
Men's rowing
Representing Italy
European Rowing Championships
Gold medal – first place	1927 Como	Eight

Medardo Lamberti (29 June 1890 – 21 March 1986) was an Italian rower. He competed at the 1928 Summer Olympics in Amsterdam with the men's eight where they were eliminated in the quarter-final.
