= Hans Hottinger =

Swiss rower

Sport
- Sport: Rowing
- Club: Basler RC
Medal record
Men's rowing
Representing Switzerland
European Rowing Championships
| Gold medal – first place | 1930 Liège | Double scull |
| Gold medal – first place | 1931 Paris | Double scull |
| Gold medal – first place | 1934 Lucerne | Double scull |

Hans Hottinger was a Swiss rower. He rowed for Basler RC. He was European champion in the double scull event with his partner Helmut von Bidder in 1930, 1931, and 1934. They were Swiss champions several time.
