= Józef Łaszewski =

Polish rower

Personal information
- Born: 30 November 1901 Warsaw, Russian Empire
- Died: unknown
- Weight: 73 kg (161 lb)

Sport
- Sport: Rowing
- Club: AZS Warszawa
Medal record
Men's rowing
Representing Poland
European Rowing Championships
Bronze medal – third place	1927 Como	Eight

Józef Łaszewski (30 November 1901 – ?) was a Polish rower. He competed at the 1928 Summer Olympics in Amsterdam with the men's eight where they were eliminated in the quarter-final.
