= Knud Olsen (rower) =

Danish rower

Personal information
- Born: Knud Jørgen Olsen; 2 October 1906 Copenhagen, Denmark
- Died: 13 June 1994 (aged 87)

Sport
- Sport: Rowing
- Club: Københavns Roklub
Medal record
Men's rowing
Representing Denmark
European Rowing Championships
Bronze medal – third place	1930 Liège	Eight
Silver medal – second place	1934 Lucerne	Eight

Knud Jørgen Olsen (2 October 1906 – 13 June 1994) was a Danish rower. He competed at the 1928 Summer Olympics in Amsterdam with the men's eight where they were eliminated in round two.
