= Jean Jonlet =

Belgian rower (1906–1987)

Personal information
- Full name: Jean-Marie Gérard Jonlet
- Nationality: Belgian
- Born: 20 November 1906; Liège, Belgium
- Died: 10 April 1987 (aged 80); Uccle, Belgium

Sport
- Sport: Rowing

Jean Jonlet (20 November 1906 – 10 April 1987) was a Belgian rower. He competed in the men's eight event at the 1928 Summer Olympics.
