= Carl Schmidt (rower) =

Danish rower (1904–1992)

Personal information
- Born: Carl Richardt Schmidt; 20 May 1904 Copenhagen, Denmark
- Died: 3 January 1992 (aged 87) Copenhagen, Denmark

Sport
- Sport: Rowing
- Club: Københavns Roklub
Medal record
Men's rowing
Representing Denmark
European Rowing Championships
Bronze medal – third place	1930 Liège	Eight

Carl Richardt Schmidt (20 May 1904 – 3 January 1992) was a Danish rower. He competed at the 1928 Summer Olympics in Amsterdam with the men's eight where they were eliminated in round two.
