= Ernst Friborg Jensen =

Danish rower

Personal information
- Born: 28 August 1906 Copenhagen, Denmark
- Died: 14 January 1996 (aged 89) Tårnby, Denmark

Sport
- Sport: Rowing
- Club: Københavns Roklub
Medal record
Men's rowing
Representing Denmark
European Rowing Championships
Bronze medal – third place	1930 Liège	Eight

Ernst Friborg Jensen (28 August 1906 – 14 January 1996) was a Danish rower. He competed at the 1928 Summer Olympics in Amsterdam with the men's eight where they were eliminated in round two.
