= Jacques Van Malderen =

Belgian rower

Jacques Constant Guillaume Van Malderen
Personal information
- Nationality: Belgian
- Born: 10 January 1906; Liège, Belgium

Sport
- Sport: Rowing

Jacques Van Malderen (born 10 January 1906) was a Belgian rower. He competed in the men's eight event at the 1928 Summer Olympics.
