= Lázaro Iturrieta =

Argentine rower (1908–?)

Personal information
- Nationality: Argentine
- Born: 1908

Sport
- Sport: Rowing

Lázaro Iturrieta (born 1908, date of death unknown) was an Argentine rower. He competed in the men's eight event at the 1928 Summer Olympics.
