= François Thonin =

French rower (1896–1974)

Personal information
- Full name: François Gabriel Thonin
- Nationality: French
- Born: 18 June 1896; Aix-les-Bains, France
- Died: 31 July 1974 (aged 78); Aix-les-Bains, France

Sport
- Sport: Rowing

François Thonin (18 June 1896 – 31 July 1974) was a French rower. He competed in the men's eight event at the 1928 Summer Olympics.
