= Marius Gervasoni =

French rower

Personal information
- Nationality: French
- Born: October 6, 1904; Bourdeau, Savoie, France
- Died: June 15, 1984 (aged 79); Aix-les-Bains, Savoie, France

Sport
- Sport: Rowing

Marius Timon Gervasoni (6 October 1904 – 15 June 1984) was a French rower. He competed in the men's eight event at the 1928 Summer Olympics.
