= Erwin Hoffstätter =

German rower

Personal information
- Nationality: German
- Born: 12 February 1897; Mannheim, Germany
- Died: 21 August 1971 (aged 74); Mannheim, Germany

Sport
- Sport: Rowing

Erwin Hoffstätter (12 February 1897 – 21 August 1971) was a German rower. He competed in the men's eight event at the 1928 Summer Olympics.
