= Alphonse Margailland =

French rower

Personal information
- Full name: Alphonse François Margailland
- Nationality: French
- Born: 1 March 1909; Tresserve, Savoie, France
- Died: 21 October 1989 (aged 80); Aix-les-Bains, Savoie, France

Sport
- Sport: Rowing

Alphonse François Margailland (1 March 1909 – 21 October 1989) was a French rower. He competed in the men's eight event at the 1928 Summer Olympics.
