= Arthur Sulley =

British rower

Medal record

Men's rowing

Representing Great Britain

Olympic Games
Silver medal – second place	1928 Amsterdam	Eight

Arthur Lindsay Sulley (8 November 1906 – 7 November 1994) was a British rowing cox who competed in the 1928 Summer Olympics.

Sulley was born in the Guisborough district of Yorkshire. He was educated at Cambridge University and coxed the winning Cambridge crew in the 1928 University Boat Race. In preparation for the Boat Race, he had joined Thames Rowing Club and had come down to the club on Sundays to increase his knowledge of the Championship Course. He was then asked by Jack Beresford to cox the Thames Rowing Club eight in the Grand Challenge Cup at Henley Royal Regatta in 1928. After winning the Grand, the crew was selected to represent Great Britain at the 1928 Amsterdam Olympics. The crew won the silver medal in the eight event.

In 1929 Sulley coxed the winning Cambridge boat in the Boat Race again. At Cambridge he became friends with the cox of the Newnham College crew – Margery Evans. They were to marry, and had three sons. Their first son Philip also took up coxing at Cambridge, becoming captain of the Selwyn College boat club. Their second son James coxed at his public school, Radley. He went to Cambridge, overlapping with his elder brother at Selwyn. He also coxed Cambridge, in 1958 and 1959.

Arthur Sulley became a coach for Thames Rowing Club, doing it for two weeks a year at the Henley regatta; he coached their crew representing Britain at the Empire Games in Vancouver in 1954. He worked in a firm in Derby – James Smith and Company – which since the 1840s had been making uniforms for railway companies (initially for the Midland Railway with its headquarters there). He became its managing director. He also started a company nearby providing overalls rented out to firms for their work-force. The firm after World War II opened a factory to employ women in a south Wales valley, where previously there had been no employment for women – the local MP was Aneurin Bevan, the Labour MP. Sulley died at Derby at the age of 88.

== See also ==
- List of Cambridge University Boat Race crews
