= Armand Lemaire =

Belgian rower

Personal information
- Nationality: Belgian
- Born: 1904

Sport
- Sport: Rowing

Armand Lemaire (born 1904, date of death unknown) was a Belgian rower. He competed in the men's eight event at the 1928 Summer Olympics.
