= Henri Micha =

Belgian rower

Personal information
- Nationality: Belgian
- Born: 26 March 1906

Sport
- Sport: Rowing

Henri Micha (born 26 March 1906, date of death unknown) was a Belgian rower. He competed in the men's eight event at the 1928 Summer Olympics.
