= Bernhardt Møller Sørensen =

Danish rower (1908–1958)

Personal information
- Born: 30 November 1908 Copenhagen, Denmark
- Died: 2 July 1958 (aged 49) Frederiksberg, Denmark
- Relatives: Sigfred Sørensen (brother)

Sport
- Sport: Rowing
- Club: Københavns Roklub
Medal record
Men's rowing
Representing Denmark
European Rowing Championships
Bronze medal – third place	1930 Liège	Eight
Silver medal – second place	1934 Lucerne	Eight

Bernhardt Møller Sørensen (30 November 1908 – 2 July 1958) was a Danish rower. He competed at the 1928 Summer Olympics in Amsterdam with the men's eight where they were eliminated in round two. He rowed with his brother Sigfred Sørensen.
