= Hermann Herbold =

German rower

Personal information
- Nationality: German
- Born: 3 November 1906; Mannheim, Germany
- Died: 29 March 1985 (aged 78); Heidelberg, Germany

Sport
- Sport: Rowing

Hermann Herbold (3 November 1906 – 29 March 1985) was a German rower. He competed in the men's eight event at the 1928 Summer Olympics.
