= Gustavo Lanusse =

Argentine rower

Personal information
- Born: 5 January 1909; Buenos Aires, Argentina
- Died: 14 March 1938 (aged 29)

Sport
- Sport: Rowing

Gustavo Lanusse (5 January 1909 – 14 March 1938) was an Argentine rower. He competed in the men's eight event at the 1928 Summer Olympics.
