= Arturo Moroni =

Italian rower (1904–1972)

Personal information
- Born: 2 May 1904 Piacenza, Italy
- Died: 19 January 1972 (aged 67) Sanremo, Italy

Sport
- Sport: Rowing
- Club: SC Vittorino da Feltre, Piacenza
Medal record
Men's rowing
Representing Italy
European Rowing Championships
Gold medal – first place	1927 Como	Eight
Gold medal – first place	1930 Liège	Coxed pair

Arturo Moroni (2 May 1904 – 19 January 1972) was an Italian rower. He competed at the 1928 Summer Olympics in Amsterdam with the men's eight where they were eliminated in the quarter-final.
