= Koos Schouwenaar =

Dutch rower

Personal information
- Nationality: Dutch
- Born: 9 October 1902; Alblasserdam, Netherlands
- Died: 22 June 1941 (aged 38); North Sea

Sport
- Sport: Rowing

Koos Schouwenaar (9 October 1902 – 22 June 1941) was a Dutch rower. He competed in the men's eight event at the 1928 Summer Olympics. He was killed in action during World War II.
