= Guglielmo Carubbi =

Italian rower

Personal information
- Born: 20 August 1908 Piacenza, Italy
- Died: 18 October 1964 (aged 56) São Paulo, Brazil

Sport
- Sport: Rowing
- Club: SC Vittorino da Feltre, Piacenza
Medal record
Men's rowing
Representing Italy
European Rowing Championships
Gold medal – first place	1927 Como	Eight
Gold medal – first place	1930 Liège	Coxed pair

Guglielmo Carubbi (20 August 1908 – 18 October 1964) was an Italian rower. He competed at the 1928 Summer Olympics in Amsterdam with the men's eight where they were eliminated in the quarter-final.
