= Benedetto Borella =

Italian rower (1899–1975)

Personal information
- Born: 14 April 1899 Piacenza, Italy
- Died: 13 January 1975 (aged 75)

Sport
- Sport: Rowing
- Club: SC Vittorino da Feltre, Piacenza
Medal record
Men's rowing
Representing Italy
European Rowing Championships
Gold medal – first place	1927 Como	Eight

Benedetto Borella (14 April 1899 – 13 January 1975) was an Italian rower. He competed at the 1928 Summer Olympics in Amsterdam with the men's eight where they were eliminated in the quarter-final.
