= Irving Bond =

Argentine rower

Personal information
- Nationality: Argentine
- Born: 1904
- Died: 1973 (aged 68–69)

Sport
- Sport: Rowing

Irving Bond (1904 – 1973) was an Argentine rower. He competed in the men's eight event at the 1928 Summer Olympics.
