= René Macors =

Belgian rower

Personal information
- Nationality: Belgian

Sport
- Sport: Rowing

René Macors was a Belgian rower. He competed in the men's eight event at the 1928 Summer Olympics.
