= Wacław Michalski =

Polish rower

Personal information
- Nationality: Polish

Sport
- Sport: Rowing

Wacław Michalski was a Polish rower. He competed in the men's eight event at the 1928 Summer Olympics.
