= Jan Huges =

Dutch rower

Personal information
- Born: Johan Huges; 30 August 1904 Amsterdam, Netherlands
- Died: 4 January 1986 (aged 81) Utrecht, Netherlands

Sport
- Sport: Rowing
- Club: Laga, Delft
Medal record
Men's rowing
Representing the Netherlands
European Rowing Championships
Silver medal – second place	1925 Prague	Eight

Johan Huges (30 August 1904 – 4 January 1986) was a Dutch rower. He competed at the 1928 Summer Olympics in Amsterdam with the men's eight where they were eliminated in round two.
