= John Brinck =

American rower

Personal information
- Born: John Manning Brinck; September 16, 1908 Winters, California, U.S.
- Died: May 19, 1934 (aged 25) Falfurrias, Texas, U.S.

Sport
- Sport: Rowing
- Event: Coxed eights
Medal record
Men's rowing
Representing the United States
Gold medal – first place	1928 Amsterdam	Eight

John Manning Brinck (September 16, 1908 – May 19, 1934) was an American rower who competed in the 1928 Summer Olympics. In 1928, he was part of the American boat, which won the gold medal in the eights. Brinck was shot dead in a robbery in Texas in 1934.
