= Otto Gordziałkowski =

Polish rower

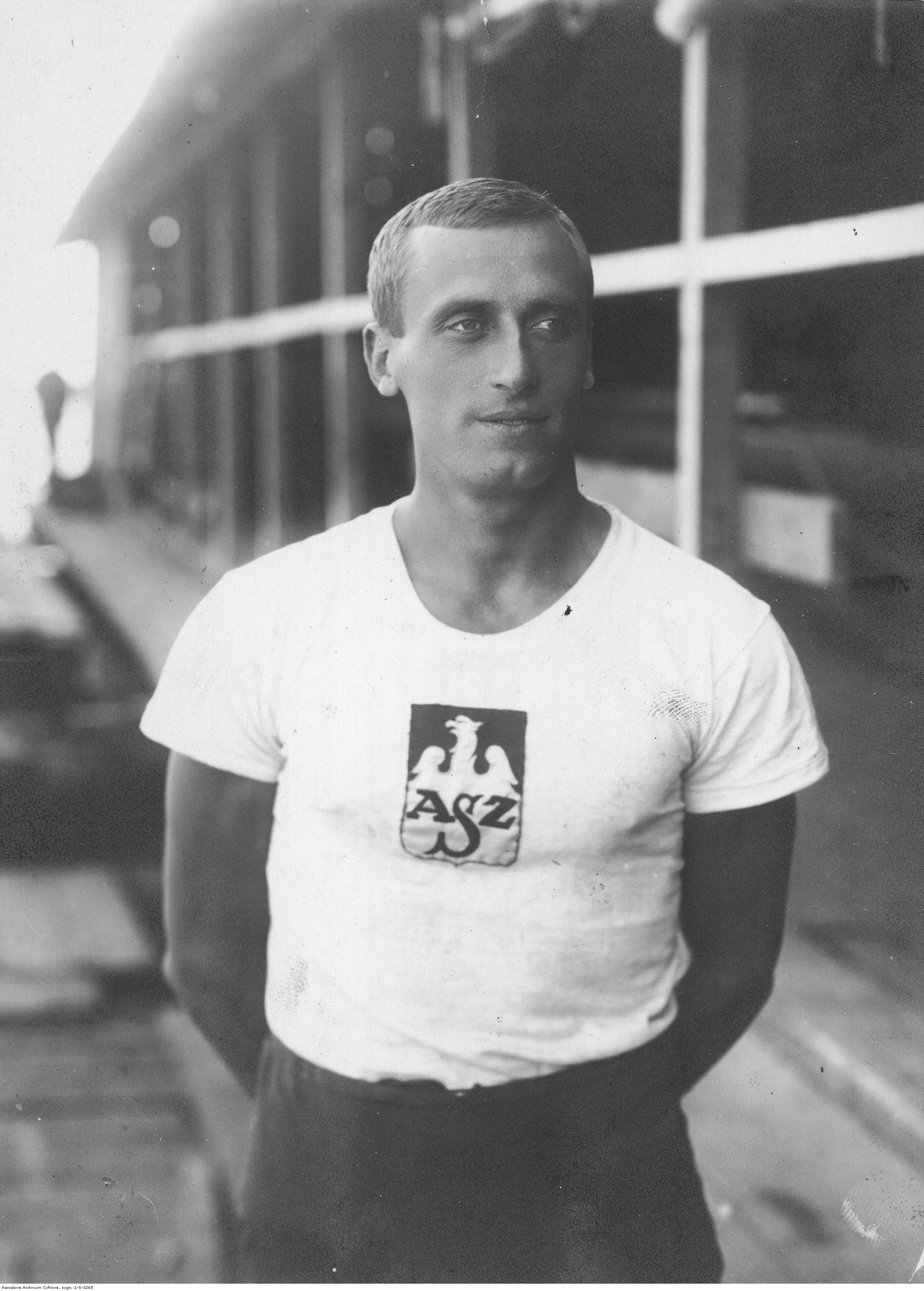
- Gordziałkowski in 1924

Personal information
- Nationality: Polish
- Born: 16 November 1898 Saint Petersburg, Russia
- Died: 28 January 1994 (aged 95) Warsaw, Poland

Sport
- Sport: Rowing

Otto Gordziałkowski (16 November 1898 – 28 January 1994) was a Polish rower. He competed in the men's eight event at the 1928 Summer Olympics.
