= Dorothy Prior =

Canadian swimmer

Personal information
- Born: 13 October 1911 Toronto, Ontario, Canada
- Died: 14 June 1997 (aged 85) Surrey, British Columbia, Canada

Sport
- Sport: Swimming

Dorothy Prior, later Shute, (13 October 1911 – 14 June 1997) was a Canadian breaststroke swimmer. She competed at the 1928 Summer Olympics and the 1932 Summer Olympics.
