= Harold West (rower) =

British rower (1899–1973)

Medal record

Men's rowing

Representing Great Britain

Olympic Games
| Silver medal – second place | 1928 Amsterdam | Eight |

Harold Ernest West (10 December 1899 – 7 August 1973) was a British rower who competed in the 1928 Summer Olympics. West was a member of Thames Rowing Club. In 1928 he was a member of the first eight, which won the Grand Challenge Cup at Henley Royal Regatta and then represented Great Britain rowing at the 1928 Summer Olympics.
