= Lew Elder =

Canadian cyclist

Personal information
- Born: 10 March 1905 Derry, Ireland
- Died: 15 May 1971 (aged 66) Lindsay, Ontario, Canada

Cycling career
- Sport: Cycling

Lewis Robert Elder (10 March 1905 – 15 May 1971) was a Canadian cyclist. He competed in three events at the 1928 Summer Olympics.
