= Michelangelo Bernasconi =

Italian rower (1901–1943)

Personal information
- Born: 17 September 1901 Como, Italy
- Died: 21 March 1943 (aged 41) Najura, Tunisia
- Height: 179 cm (5 ft 10 in)
- Weight: 75 kg (165 lb)

Sport
- Sport: Rowing
Medal record
Men's rowing
Representing Italy
European Rowing Championships
Bronze medal – third place	1920 Mâcon	Eight
Silver medal – second place	1926 Lucerne	Double scull
Gold medal – first place	1927 Como	Single scull
Silver medal – second place	1927 Como	Double scull
Silver medal – second place	1929 Bydgoszcz	Double scull
Silver medal – second place	1930 Liège	Double scull
Bronze medal – third place	1931 Paris	Double scull

Michelangelo Bernasconi (17 September 1901 – 21 March 1943), also known as Piastrella, was an Italian rower. He competed at the 1928 Summer Olympics in Amsterdam with the men's single sculls where he was eliminated in the round two repechage. He was killed in action in 1943 fighting in World War II in Tunisia.
