= William Thompson (rower) =

American rower

Medal record

Men's rowing

Representing the United States

Olympic Games
Gold medal – first place	1928 Amsterdam	Eight

William G. Thompson (July 19, 1908 – February 8, 1956) was an American rower who competed in the 1928 Summer Olympics.

In 1928, he rowed as the number four man in the American boat, which was made up of the University of California crew and won the gold medal in the eights.

Graduated from University of California in 1929 with BS degrees in electrical and mechanical engineering; married Sally Lincoln in 1933 with whom he had two sons, William G Thompson Jr. (1936) and Bruce W Thompson (1945). Active in community service, he was president of the school board and the planning commission of the City of El Segundo, CA at the time of his death.
