= Joseph Berthet =

French rower

Personal information
- Nationality: French
- Born: 24 June 1900; Voglans
- Died: 14 July 1980 (aged 80); Alixan

Sport
- Sport: Rowing

Joseph Berthet (24 June 1900 – 14 July 1980) was a French rower. He competed in the men's eight event at the 1928 Summer Olympics. His brother Marius Berthet was also an Olympic rower.
