= Donald Gollan =

British rower

Olympic medal record

Men's rowing
Silver medal – second place	1928 Amsterdam	Eight

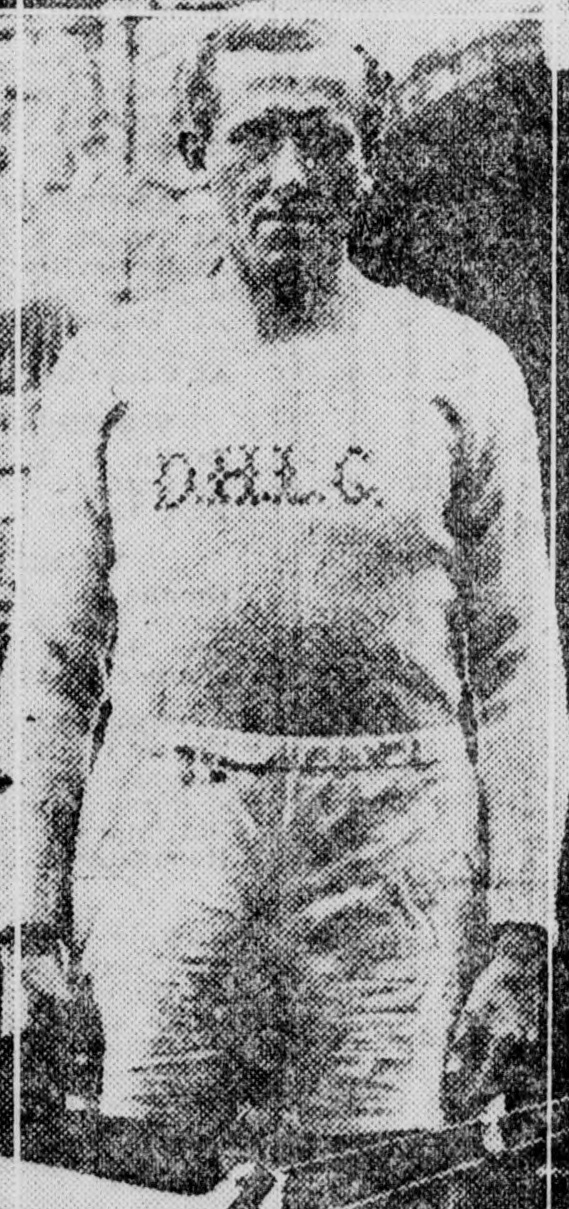
Donald Gollan in 1923

Donald Herbert Louis Gollan (19 January 1896 – 13 August 1971) was a British rower who competed in the 1928 Summer Olympics, winning silver. He was partially deaf and communicated using British Sign Language.

== Sport career ==
Gollan was born in Paddington, London, the son of Spencer Gollan, a racehorse owner and keen sportsman from New Zealand. He started his sport career as a competitive swimmer, encouraged by his father.

He was a member of both Thames Rowing Club and Vesta Rowing Club. He was initially a single sculler and first entered the Wingfield Sculls in 1914. He was probably excused from war service owing to his disability.

In 1920 Gollan was runner up to Jack Beresford in the Diamond Challenge Sculls at Henley Royal Regatta and in the Wingfield Sculls. From 1920 he was Beresford's toughest competitor in the Wingfield Sculls which in 1921 were decided on a foul after Beresford's boat was holed in a clash with Gollan. Both scullers were being steered by their fathers and so in 1922 it was decided that fathers of competitors should not act as pilots or steer the cutters. Gollan was again runner up to Beresford in that year. In 1923 Gollan won the London Cup at the Metropolitan Regatta but was runner up in the Diamonds to M K Morris, and to Beresford in the Wingfield Sculls. In 1925 he was again runner-up to Beresford at Henley.

In 1927 and 1928 Gollan was a member of the Thames eight which won the Grand Challenge Cup at Henley. The crew then represented Great Britain rowing at the 1928 Summer Olympics and won the silver medal.

Gollan died at Worthing, West Sussex, at the age of 75.

== See also ==
- Deaf people in the Olympics
