= William Dally =

American rower (1908–1996)

Olympic medal record

Men's rowing

Representing the United States
Gold medal – first place	1928 Amsterdam	Eight

William Morris Dally (February 22, 1908 – May 30, 1996) was an American rower who competed in the 1928 Summer Olympics.

In 1928, he was part of the American boat, which won the gold medal in the eights.
