= Art Keay =

Canadian long-distance runner

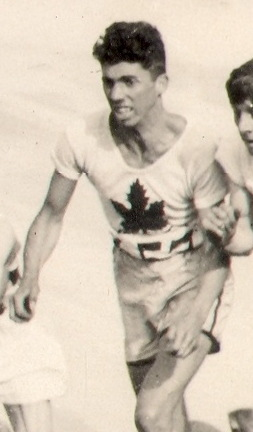
- Art Keay in 1928

Personal information
- Full name: Arthur Hayward "Art" Keay, Jr.
- Born: 19 March 1907 Toronto, Ontario, Canada
- Died: 14 October 1989 (aged 82)

Sport
- Sport: Long-distance running
- Event: 5000 metres

Arthur Hayward "Art" Keay Jr. (19 March 1907 – 14 October 1989) was a Canadian long-distance runner. He competed in the men's 5000 metres at the 1928 Summer Olympics.
