= Andrzej Sołtan-Pereświat =

Polish rower (1906–1939)

Personal information
- Nationality: Polish
- Born: 30 November 1906 Kyiv, Russian Empire
- Died: 4 September 1939 (aged 32) Nieszawa, Poland

Sport
- Sport: Rowing

Andrzej Sołtan-Pereświat (30 November 1906 – 4 September 1939) was a Polish rower. He competed in the men's eight event at the 1928 Summer Olympics. He was killed in action during World War II.
