= Joe Laporte =

Canadian cyclist

Personal information
- Born: 31 March 1907 Montreal, Quebec, Canada
- Died: 12 May 1983 (aged 76) Quebec, Canada

Cycling career
- Sport: Cycling

Joe Laporte (31 March 1907 – 12 May 1983) was a Canadian cyclist. He competed in two events at the 1924 Summer Olympics and two events at the 1928 Summer Olympics.
