= Francis Frederick =

American rower

Olympic medal record

Men's rowing

Representing the United States
| Gold medal – first place | 1928 Amsterdam | Men's eight |

Francis Harland Frederick (February 28, 1907 – May 2, 1968) was an American rower who competed in the 1928 Summer Olympics.

In 1928, he was part of the American boat, which won the gold medal in the eights.
