= Jamie Hamilton (publisher) =

British rower and publisher (1900-1988)

Olympic medal record

Men's rowing
Silver medal – second place	1928 Amsterdam	Eight

James Hamilton (15 November 1900 – 24 May 1988) was a Scottish and American rower and publisher. He competed for Great Britain in the 1928 Summer Olympics. He founded publisher Hamish Hamilton.

A portrait of Jamie Hamilton at the Thames Rowing Club

== Life ==
Hamilton was born in Indianapolis to a Scottish father, James Neilson Hamilton, businessman, his wife, Susanne or Alice van Valkenburg, an American. He was raised by relatives in Scotland, and educated at Rugby School. He studied modern languages and law at Gonville and Caius College, Cambridge, and was called to the bar in 1925. As a member of the Thames Rowing Club, he was part of the eight which won the Grand Challenge Cup at Henley Royal Regatta in 1927. A different crew including Hamilton won the Grand Challenge Cup again in 1928, and was chosen to represent Great Britain in rowing at the 1928 Summer Olympics where they won a silver medal.

Hamilton married Jean Forbes-Robertson in 1929, but the marriage ended in 1933. In 1940 he married Yvonne Pallavicino. They lived on Hamilton Terrace in St John's Wood, London. They had one son, historian Alastair Hamilton.

In World War 2, Hamilton served in the army in France and the Netherlands, then in America with the Ministry of Information.

Hamilton was an employee of the book department at Harrods, then worked at Jonathan Cape before moving to America where he worked for Cass Canfield at Harper & Brothers. He founded his own publishing house, Hamish Hamilton, in the 1930s, naming it after himself. ("Hamish" is the Gaelic form; "James" the English form, of which "Jamie" is the diminutive form. He eventually changed his name by deed poll to "Hamish".) He went on to publish a large number of promising British and American authors, many of whom were his personal friends and acquaintances. He sold the firm to the Thomson Organisation in 1965, remaining managing director until 1972 and chairman until 1981, and finally company president until his death. He was succeeded as managing director by Christopher Sinclair-Stevenson. The firm was sold to Penguin Books in 1986.
