= Marius Berthet =

French rower

Personal information
- Nationality: French
- Born: 29 December 1903; Saint-Ours, Savoie
- Died: 22 February 1987 (aged 83); Aix-les-Bains

Sport
- Sport: Rowing

Marius Berthet (29 December 1903 – 22 February 1987) was a French rower. He competed in the men's eight event at the 1928 Summer Olympics. His brother Joseph Berthet was also an Olympic rower.
