= Jack Walter (runner) =

Canadian middle-distance runner

Personal information
- Born: 6 November 1908 Listowel, Ontario, Canada
- Died: 17 July 1971 (aged 62) Sheboygan, Wisconsin, U.S.

Sport
- Sport: Middle-distance running
- Event: 800 metres

John Sproule Walter (6 November 1908 – 17 July 1971) was a Canadian middle-distance runner. He competed in the men's 800 metres at the 1928 Summer Olympics. Walter finished fourth in the 1930 British Empire Games 1 mile. He was later an attorney in Sheboygan, Wisconsin, and died there in 1971 after a long illness.
