= Charles Marshall (cyclist) =

British cyclist

Personal information
- Full name: Charles Marshall
- Born: 18 January 1901
- Died: 25 January 1973 (aged 72)

Cycling career
- Sport: Cycling

Charles Marshall (18 January 1901 – 25 January 1973) was a British cyclist. He competed in the individual and team road race events at the 1928 Summer Olympics.
