= Garnet Ault =

Canadian swimmer

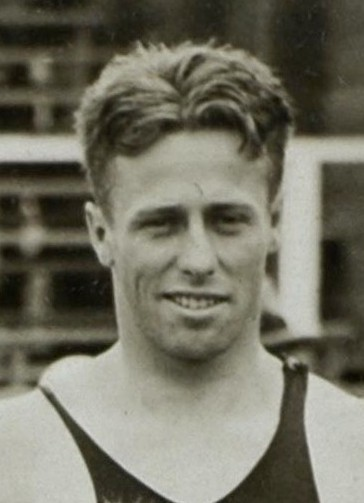
- Canadian 4 × 200 m team at the 1928 Olympics, Ault is first from right

Personal information
- Full name: Garnet Walter Ault
- National team: Canada
- Born: November 1, 1905 North Bay, Ontario
- Died: September 10, 1993 (aged 87) Bellaire, Michigan

Sport
- Sport: Swimming
- Strokes: Freestyle
- College team: University of Michigan
Medal record
Men's swimming
Representing Canada
Olympic Games
Bronze medal – third place	1928 Amsterdam	4×200 m freestyle

Garnet Walter Ault (November 1, 1905 – September 10, 1993) was a Canadian competition swimmer and Olympic medallist. At the 1928 Summer Olympics in Amsterdam, Ault competed in the 4×200-metre, 400-metre and 1500-metre freestyle events, and won a bronze medal in the relay; he finished sixth in the 1500-metre final, and did not advance past the preliminary heats in the 400-metre. The same year he set a Canadian record in the mile at 23:36.6.

In 1930 Ault graduated from the University of Michigan with a medical degree. He specialized in proctology, and in 1937 became member of the American Proctologic Society. Next year, while working as a surgery professor at the Georgetown University, he started his own practice in Washington, D.C.

Ault was president of the American Proctologic Society from 1964 to 1965, vice-president of the American Board of Colorectal Surgery in 1962–1963, and chief of proctology at the Washington Hospital Center. He retired in 1974, and moved to Florida, and then to Michigan, where he died of a heart attack aged 87.

== See also ==
- List of Olympic medalists in swimming (men)
- List of University of Michigan alumni
