= Peter Donlon =

American rower (1906–1979)

Olympic medal record

Men's rowing

Representing the United States
Gold medal – first place	1928 Amsterdam	Men's eight

Peter Dwight Donlon (December 16, 1906 – December 14, 1979) was an American rower who competed in the 1928 Summer Olympics in Amsterdam.

In 1928, he was the stroke of the American boat, which won the gold medal in the eights.
