= Marvin Stalder =

American rower

Medal record

Men's rowing

Representing the United States

Olympic Games
Gold medal – first place	1928 Amsterdam	Eight

Marvin Frederick Stalder (December 9, 1905 – September 2, 1982) was an American rower who competed in the 1928 Summer Olympics.

In 1928, he was part of the American boat which won the gold medal in the eights.
