= Hubert A. Caldwell =

American rower (1907–1972)

Olympic medal record

Men's rowing

Representing the United States
Gold medal – first place	1928 Amsterdam	Eight

Hubert Augustus Caldwell (December 26, 1907 – August 9, 1972) was an American athlete who competed in Men's Crew.

He was in the University of California, Berkeley class of 1929 and a member of the California-Alpha Sigma Phi Epsilon fraternity. An oars-man for his university's crew team, he competed in the 1928 Olympics in Amersterdam for which the team brought back gold medals. He was a member of the US National Championship Crew Team that year.
