= Cristian Jeandet =

Argentine footballer (born 1975)

Personal information
- Full name: Cristian Daniel Jeandet
- Date of birth: 1 March 1975 (age 51)
- Place of birth: Concordia, Argentina
- Height: 1.82 m (6 ft 0 in)
- Position: Forward

Youth career
- 1987–1989: Estudiantes Concordia
- 1989–1995: Newell's Old Boys

Senior career*
Years	Team	Apps	(Gls)
1995–1997	Newell's Old Boys	0	(0)
1995–1996	→ Ferrocaril de Concordia (loan)		
1996–1997	→ Patronato (loan)		
1997	Lanús	0	(0)
1997	Fidelis Andria	4	(0)
1998	Casertana		
1998	Fidenza	0	(0)
1999	Sartid Smederevo	6	(1)
2000	Palestino		
2000–2001	Central Córdoba	20	(9)
2001–2002	Instituto de Córdoba	31	(8)
2002	Blooming	8	(1)
2003	Sport Boys	47	(17)
2003–2004	Gimnasia y Esgrima	26	(3)
2004–2005	Sport Boys		
2005–2006	Sarmiento	42	(12)
2007	Estudiantes de Buenos Aires	16	(6)
2007	Wydad Casablanca		
2008	Mineros de Guayana	9	(3)
2008–2009	Villa Dálmine	31	(13)
2009	Sarmiento de Leones	36	(8)
2010	Almagro	18	(1)
2010–2012	Deportivo Laferrere	40	(19)
2012–2013	Unión Aconquija	29	(23)
2013–2014	General Paz Juniors	15	(6)
2014	Talleres de Perico	9	(2)
2014–2016	Sarmiento Leones	36	(8)
- * Club domestic league appearances and goals

Cristian Daniel Jeandet (born March 1, 1975) is a retired Argentine football striker. He retired in December 2015 after playing in 23 clubs and in the top leagues of eight countries: Argentina, Italy, FR Yugoslavia, Chile, Bolivia, Peru, Morocco and Venezuela. He is regarded along Lutz Pfannenstiel and Sebastián Abreu among the best known globetrotters.

== Career ==
=== Beginnings and Newell's ===
Born in Concordia, Entre Ríos, Argentina, he started playing in local side Estudiantes Concordia when he was 12. By his own words, he scored 60 goals in 23 games in first year, and 73 goals in 36 games in next one, receiving, an award as the recognition of the record of goals in youth levels, by then, at the city of Paraná, Entre Ríos. After that, Newell's Old Boys coach, Marcelo Bielsa, took him after trials. Jeandet spent 6 years at youth levels of Newell's, reaching promotion to the first team but without ever debuting in the league. Then what followed were loans, first six months to Ferrocaril de Concordia playing at Torneo Argentino A in 1995–96, but failed to qualify to final stage of the tournament, and next to same level club Patronato, in 1996–97, reaching with them the semi-finals.

=== Europe: Italy and Yugoslavia ===
After the loans at Argentino A, Jeandet left Newell's and joined Lanús. He faced tough competition for a spot in the team from older and more experienced Claudio Enría and Ariel "Chupa" López. He failed to debut in the league, so he left, this time moving abroad, crossing the Atlantic, and settling in Italy. First he played with Fidelis Andria, competing in Serie B at that time, and making 4 appearances. Next, he played with Casertana F.C. and Fidenza. He experienced difficulties adapting, so he decided during the winter-break of 1999–2000 to cross the Adriatic and join Serbian side Sartid Smederevo playing back then in the First League of FR Yugoslavia. He stayed six months in Yugoslavia, leaving Sartid at the end of the season. In between, he also apent some time in Switzerland with FC Lugano.

=== Back to South America ===
After leaving Sartid, Jeandet crossed back the Atlantic, but instead of returning to his native Argentina, he went to Chile where he joined Palestino. There were three more Argentinian players in the club and Jeandet adapted well, however not long afterwards, the club changed the coach and Argentinian Ricardo Dabrowski was brought, who said Jeandet was not in his plans. That meant the end of the short spell at Palestino in Chile, and Jeandet returned to Argentina. Dalcio Giovagnoli informed him about the ambitious project Central Córdoba was having under way at the time. Several Jeandet's former colleagues from Newell's were also playing at that time at the club, and Jeandet spent a solid 2000–01 season with Central Córdoba. They reached the "octogonal" with Jeandet scoring 9 goals in the process, but were eliminated in the 1/8 finals by Instituto de Córdoba which were strong and coached by Gerardo "Tata" Martino. Jeandet moved precisely to Instituto for the next season, but with Tito Martino already gone, and not getting many chances as a starter in the line-up, Jeandet opted to leave as soon as a good offer from Bolivian side Blooming arrived through his agent.

=== Peru ===
The arrival to a major Bolivian club looked initially promising, however the club at the time was experiencing major difficulties. After three months at Blooming the situation became unsustainable; several coaches changed and the players were receiving no salaries and were on strike. Jeandet decided to leave, and left Bolivia and moved to Peru where he joined Club Aurora. He stayed at Aurora six very important months for the club, since Jeandet was crucial in the squad from Cochabamba that won the 2002 Copa Simón Bolívar thus earning promotion after 14 years to the Liga de Fútbol Profesional Boliviano, the national top tier. Jeandet scored two goals in the decisive victory of Aurora over Fancesa by 5–1.

Next, he joined Peruvian top-league side Sport Boys where he played coached by his compatriot Jorge Sampaoli during 2003. At the time his daughter Catalina was about to born, his wife wanted to have her in Argentina. By that time, Jeandet was approached by Cienciano president with an offer to join the club and become their main striker in their upcoming Copa Sudamericana campaign, but with Jeandet disbelief of Cienciano doing well in the Copa, and the disadvantage of that meaning a move to Cusco, Peru, over his wife's desire to return to Argentina, Jeandet dropped the offer from Cienciano and joined Argentinian side Gimnasia y Esgrima. Playing in the Primera B Nacional, they finished the season relegated. Besides the bad sporting result, the club also failed to pay the last six salaries, which meant also a bad financial decision for him, and to make the bad choice even harder, Cienciano surprisingly won the Copa Sudamericana that season, and consequently, the Recopa Sudamericana as well.

=== Globetrotter: Morocco and Venezuela ===
After this disastrous decision, Jeandet was decided to reanimate his career. After spells at Sarmiento de Junin and Estudiantes de Buenos Aires he moved again abroad. After trials in Austria, he joined in 2007, along Claudio Ortiz, Wydad Casablanca, becoming the first Argentinians to play in the Moroccan top league, the Botola. He played with Wydad in the CAF Champions League. The African adventure was followed by a trip to Venezuela where he played with Mineros de Guayana.

=== Back to Argentina ===
After Venezuela, he returned to Argentina and in the following years he had spells with Villa Dálmine, Sarmiento de Leones, Almagro, Deportivo Laferrere, Unión Aconquija, General Paz Juniors, Talleres de Perico and Sarmiento Leones.

== Personal life ==
Criistian Jeandet has four children, the older one, Catalina, then Constanza, Jeremías and Felipe. By spring 2014, Jeremías was playing football in Belgrano as striker.

== Honors ==
Aurora

- Copa Simón Bolívar: 2002

Individual:

- Torneo Argentino B top-scorer: 2012–13 (22 goals)
