= Marian Wodziański =

Polish rower (1901–1983)

Personal information
- Nationality: Polish
- Born: 16 July 1901 Kyiv, Russian Empire
- Died: 21 July 1983 (aged 82) Pittsburgh, Pennsylvania, United States

Sport
- Sport: Rowing

Marian Wodziański (16 July 1901 – 21 July 1983) was a Polish rower. He competed in the men's eight event at the 1928 Summer Olympics.
