= Armin Meyer =

Argentine rower

Personal information
- Nationality: Argentine
- Born: 1907

Sport
- Sport: Rowing

Armin Meyer (born 1907, date of death unknown) was an Argentine rower. He competed in the men's eight event at the 1928 Summer Olympics.
