= John Badcock (rower) =

British rower

Olympic medal record

Representing Great Britain

Men's rowing
Gold medal – first place	1932 Los Angeles	Coxless four
Silver medal – second place	1928 Amsterdam	Eight

John Charles Badcock (17 January 1903 – 29 May 1976), also known as Felix Badcock, was a British rower who competed in the 1928 Summer Olympics and in the 1932 Summer Olympics.

== Life ==
Badcock was born in West Ham and educated at Merchant Taylor's School. His family had been in business as boat builders and wharfingers on the River Thames for nearly a hundred years. Badcock became a member of Thames Rowing Club and had his first win at Henley Royal Regatta in 1925 in the Wyfold Challenge Cup. In 1927 he was in the Thames eight which won the Grand Challenge Cup and in the coxless four which won the Stewards' Challenge Cup. In 1928 he was again in the winning Thames crews in the Grand and Stewards at Henley. The Thames eight was then chosen to represent Great Britain rowing at the 1928 Summer Olympics and won the silver medal.

In 1932 he was again in the winning Thames crew in the Stewards Challenge Cup at Henley. The Thames coxless four was then chosen to represent Great Britain rowing at the 1932 Summer Olympics and won the gold medal in a hard race against the Germans. Badcock was appointed a vice-president of Thames Rowing Club in 1936.

In 1934, Badcock married the swimmer, Joyce Cooper, who had one silver and three bronze medals at the 1928 and 1932 Olympics. Their elder son, Felix Badcock, rowed for England at the 1958 Commonwealth Games and their younger son, Francis 'David', rowed for Oxford in 1958 as well as standing as reserve for the 1958 Commonwealth Games eight.

== Achievements ==
=== Olympic Games ===
- 1928 – Silver, Eight
- 1932 – Gold, Coxless Four

=== Henley Royal Regatta ===
- 1925 – Wyfold Challenge Cup
- 1927 – Grand Challenge Cup
- 1927 – Stewards' Challenge Cup
- 1928 – Grand Challenge Cup
- 1928 – Stewards' Challenge Cup
- 1932 – Stewards' Challenge Cup
