= Alfred Tourville =

Canadian cyclist

Personal information
- Born: 9 September 1908 Montreal, Quebec, Canada
- Died: 22 June 1983 (aged 74) Quebec City, Quebec, Canada

Cycling career
- Sport: Cycling

Alfred Tourville (9 September 1908 – 22 June 1983) was a Canadian cyclist. He competed in the individual and team road race events at the 1928 Summer Olympics.
