= Édouard Jeandet =

French rower

Personal information
- Nationality: French
- Born: 8 March 1902 Aix-les-Bains, France
- Died: 22 September 1958 (aged 56) Aix-les-Bains, France

Sport
- Sport: Rowing

Édouard Jeandet (8 March 1902 – 22 September 1958) was a French rower. He competed in the men's eight event at the 1928 Summer Olympics.
