= Harold Lane (rower) =

British rower

Olympic medal record

Men's rowing
Silver medal – second place	1928 Amsterdam	Eight

Harold Mansfield Lane (13 March 1895 – 24 June 1972) was a British rower who competed in the 1928 Summer Olympics.

Lane was a member of Thames Rowing Club In 1928 he was a member of the Thames eight which won the Grand Challenge Cup at Henley Royal Regatta. The crew then represented Great Britain rowing at the 1928 Summer Olympics and won the silver medal.
