= Gordon Killick =

British rower

Personal information
- Nationality: British
- Born: 3 June 1899 Fulham, England
- Died: 10 October 1962 (aged 63) Putney, England
- Weight: 83 kg (183 lb)

Sport
- Sport: Rowing
- Club: Thames Rowing Club
Medal record
Representing Great Britain
Olympic Games
Silver medal – second place	1928 Amsterdam	Eight

Gordon Cecil Killick (3 June 1899 – 10 October 1962), also known as Bill Killick, was a British rower who competed in the 1924 Summer Olympics and in the 1928 Summer Olympics.

== Life ==
Killick was born in Fulham. He was a member of Thames Rowing Club.

In 1924 he participated with his partner (and brother-in-law) Thomas Southgate in the first round of the coxless pairs event rowing at the 1924 Summer Olympics. But they did not start in the final, Southgate having suffered a bout of lumbago, and although considered to be in third place, were not awarded with medals. They were also spare pair for the British eight.

In 1925 Killick was a member of the crew that won the Wyfold Challenge Cup at Henley Royal Regatta, and in 1927 was a member of the crew that won the Grand Challenge Cup at Henley, as well as the Wyfolds. In 1928 he won the Silver Goblets & Nickalls' Challenge Cup at Henley partnering Jack Beresford. He was also a member of the Thames eight which won the Grand Challenge Cup and which then won the silver medal for Great Britain rowing at the 1928 Summer Olympics. In 1929 he won Silver Goblets again with Jack Beresford.

== Achievements ==
=== Olympic Games ===
- 1928 – Silver, Eight

=== Henley Royal Regatta ===
- 1925 – Wyfold Challenge Cup
- 1927 – Grand Challenge Cup
- 1927 – Wyfold Challenge Cup
- 1928 – Grand Challenge Cup
- 1928 – Silver Goblets & Nickalls' Challenge Cup (with Jack Beresford)
- 1929 – Silver Goblets & Nickalls' Challenge Cup (with Jack Beresford)
