= Louis Jeandet =

French rower

Personal information
- Full name: Louis Eugène Jeandet
- Nationality: French
- Born: 28 August 1900; Aix-les-Bains, France
- Died: 18 September 1967 (aged 67); Suresnes, France

Sport
- Sport: Rowing

Louis Jeandet (28 August 1900 – 18 September 1967) was a French rower. He competed in the men's eight event at the 1928 Summer Olympics.
