= Herbert Richardson (rower) =

Canadian Olympic rower

Olympic medal record

Men's rowing
Bronze medal – third place	1928 Amsterdam	Eight

Herbert Trenchard Richardson (November 25, 1903 – January 17, 1982) was a Canadian rower who competed in the 1928 Summer Olympics. In 1928 he won the bronze medal as member of the Canadian boat in the eights competition.

He was born in Toronto.
