= Frederick Hedges =

Canadian rower (1903–1989)

Olympic medal record

Men's rowing
Bronze medal – third place	1928 Amsterdam	Eight

Frederick Charles Hedges (October 4, 1903 – December 10, 1989) was a Canadian rower who competed in the 1928 Summer Olympics.

In 1928 he won the bronze medal as member of the Canadian boat in the eights competition.

He was born and died in Toronto.
