= James Workman (rower) =

American rower (1908–1983)

Medal record

Men's rowing

Representing the United States

Olympic Games
Gold medal – first place	1928 Amsterdam	Men's eight

James Theodore Workman (April 30, 1908 – October 15, 1983) was an American rower, born in Woodward, Oklahoma, who competed in the 1928 Summer Olympics.

In 1928, he was part of the American boat, which won the gold medal in the eights.
