= Edgar Norris =

Canadian rower

Olympic medal record

Men's rowing
Bronze medal – third place	1928 Amsterdam	Eight

Cyril Edgar Norris (December 23, 1902 – April 20, 1982) was a Canadian rower, born in Toronto, who competed in the 1928 Summer Olympics.

In 1928 he won the bronze medal as member of the Canadian boat in the eights competition.
