= Frank Fiddes =

Canadian rower (1906–1981)

Olympic medal record

Men's rowing
Bronze medal – third place	1928 Amsterdam	Eight

Frank James Fiddes (July 16, 1906 – March 26, 1981) was a Canadian rower, born in Toronto, who competed in the 1928 Summer Olympics.

In 1928 he won the bronze medal as member of the Canadian boat in the eights competition.
