= Athol Meech =

Canadian rower

Olympic medal record

Men's rowing
Bronze medal – third place	1928 Amsterdam	Eight

Athol Charles Meech (March 28, 1907 – August 2, 1981) was a Canadian rower, born in Ottawa, who competed in the 1928 Summer Olympics.

In 1928 he won the bronze medal as member of the Canadian boat in the eights competition.
