= Jack Murdoch =

Canadian rower

Olympic medal record

Men's rowing

Representing Canada
Bronze medal – third place	1928 Amsterdam	Eight

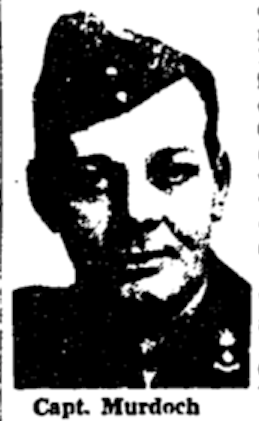
Military photograph of Murdoch

Captain John Lawrence Cosgrave Murdoch (July 18, 1908 – October 10, 1944) was a Canadian rower who competed in the 1928 Summer Olympics.

In 1928 he won the bronze medal as member of the Canadian boat in the eights competition. An officer with the Royal Canadian Artillery, he died in the Netherlands during the Second World War.
