= William Ross (rower) =

Canadian rower

Olympic medal record

Men's rowing
Bronze medal – third place	1928 Amsterdam	Eight

William MacPherson Ross (29 July 1900 – 14 June 1992) was a Canadian rower, born in Acton, Ontario, who competed in the 1928 Summer Olympics. In 1928 he won the bronze medal as member of the Canadian boat in the eights competition. He also competed in the 1930 British Empire Games.
