= John Donnelly (rowing) =

Canadian rower (1905–1986)

Olympic medal record

Men's rowing
| Bronze medal – third place | 1928 Amsterdam | Eight |

John Henry Donnelly (March 19, 1905 – August 19, 1986) was a Canadian coxswain, born in Toronto, Ontario, Canada who competed in the 1928 Summer Olympics.

In 1928 he won the bronze medal as cox of the Canadian boat in the men's eight competition. Donnelly was a coach at the Argonaut Rowing Club of Toronto, which represented Canada in the Olympics.
