= John Hand (rower) =

Canadian rower (1902–1967)

Olympic medal record

Men's rowing
Bronze medal – third place	1928 Amsterdam	Eight

John Loudwell Hand (June 14, 1902 – July 7, 1967) was a Canadian rower who competed in the 1928 Summer Olympics.

Born in Toronto, he won the bronze medal as member of the Canadian boat in the eights competition in 1928.
