= Jack Beresford =

British rower (1899–1977)

Jack Beresford CBE
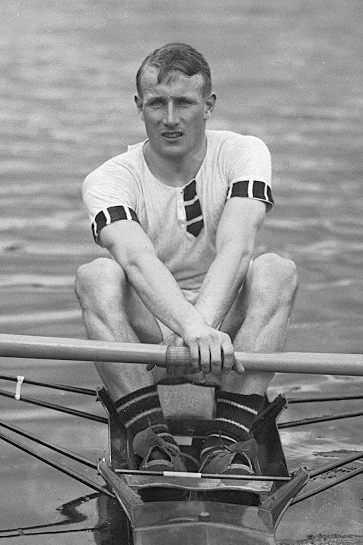
- Beresford at the 1920 Olympics

Personal information
- Born: Jack Beresford-Wiszniewski; 1 January 1899 Chiswick, West London, England
- Died: 3 December 1977 (aged 78) Shiplake, Oxfordshire, England
- Relatives: Julius Beresford (father); Michael Beresford (nephew)
- Children Elizabeth, John, Carina and Pandora

Sport
- Sport: Rowing
- Club: Thames Rowing Club; Leander Club
Medal record
Representing United Kingdom
Olympic Games
Gold medal – first place	1924 Paris	Single sculls
Gold medal – first place	1932 Los Angeles	Coxless fours
Gold medal – first place	1936 Berlin	Double sculls
Silver medal – second place	1920 Antwerp	Single sculls
Silver medal – second place	1928 Amsterdam	Eights
Representing England
British Empire Games
Silver medal – second place	1930 Hamilton	Single sculls
Diamond Challenge Sculls
Gold medal – first place	1920 Henley-on-Thames	Single sculls
Silver medal – second place	1921 Henley-on-Thames	Single sculls
Silver medal – second place	1922 Henley-on-Thames	Single sculls
Gold medal – first place	1924 Henley-on-Thames	Single sculls
Gold medal – first place	1925 Henley-on-Thames	Single sculls
Gold medal – first place	1926 Henley-on-Thames	Single sculls
Gold Cup Challenge
Gold medal – first place	1925 Philadelphia	Single sculls
Gold medal – first place	1924 Philadelphia	Single sculls

Jack Beresford, CBE (1 January 1899 – 3 December 1977), born Jack Beresford-Wiszniewski, was a British rower who won five medals at five Olympic Games in succession. This record in Olympic rowing was not matched until 2000 when Steve Redgrave won his sixth Olympic medal at his fifth Olympic Games.

== Early life ==
Jack Beresford was the son of Julius Beresford. The family name was Wisniewski but his father dropped the name after Beresford was born. Julius Beresford was also a rower who won an Olympic silver medal for Great Britain rowing at the 1912 Summer Olympics as well as winning several times at Henley. Jack was educated at Bedford School where he stroked the eight and also captained the rugby football XV. During the First World War he served in the Liverpool Scottish Regiment and was wounded in the leg in France. He returned to London and learned the craft of furniture-making for Beresford & Hicks in his father's factory. He took up sculling because the leg wound put an end to his rugby career. Throughout his competitive career, Beresford (like his father and his brother, Eric Beresford) represented Thames Rowing Club. Michael Beresford was his nephew who competed in rowing at the 1960 Olympics.

== Rowing career ==
Kelly v. Beresford, 1920 Olympics

In 1920, Beresford won the Diamond Challenge Sculls, the single sculls event at the Henley Royal Regatta beating in the final Donald Gollan, his closest British rival for the next few years. He followed this up competing in the single sculls event rowing at the 1920 Summer Olympics where his final race against John B. Kelly Sr. is legendary. It featured a dramatic stretch run with Kelly eventually prevailing in one of the closest single sculls races in Olympic history. In 1920 Beresford won the Wingfield Sculls, the Amateur Sculling Championship of the Thames and Great Britain for the first time, and went on to win it for seven consecutive years, a streak unmatched in history He also won the London Cup to give him the sculling triple crown in 1920.

Beresford was losing finalist to Eyken in the Diamond Sculls in 1921 but won the London Cup and the Wingfields which was decided on a foul after Beresford's boat was holed in a clash with Gollan. Both scullers were being steered by their fathers and so in 1922 it was decided that in future fathers of competitors should not act as pilots or steer the cutters. Beresford lost Diamonds in the final to Walter Hoover but won the Wingfields and London Cup over Gollan. In 1923 Beresford was in the winning Thames eight in the Grand Challenge Cup. He was runner up in the Diamonds to M. K. Morris, lost to Gollan in the London Cup on a foul, but beat Gollan in the Wingfields.

Beresford won the Diamond Challenge Sculls at Henley again in 1924 against Craig, and went on to win the gold medal in the single scull rowing at the 1924 Summer Olympics over William Gilmore. Following that he competed in and won the Philadelphia Gold Cup, awarded by the Schuylkill Navy for the amateur sculling championship of the world. In 1925, he successfully defended the Diamond Challenge Sculls against Donald Gollan and the Philadelphia Cup against Walter Hoover before indicating to its stewards that he no longer wished to contest it. With the Wingfields and London Cup he won the triple crown. Beresford won the Diamond Challenge Sculls again in 1926 beating G E G Goddard in the final. He won the London Cup again and also the Wingfields, but only after his boat was holed in a clash and the race re-rowed on 11 August.

Beresford was not a winning competitor in 1927, but served as Captain of Thames in 1928-9. In 1928 at Henley he won the Silver Goblets & Nickalls' Challenge Cup partnering Gordon "Bill" Killick. He was also a member of the Thames eight which won the Grand Challenge Cup at Henley Royal Regatta. This crew then represented Great Britain to win the silver medal rowing at the 1928 Summer Olympics. His Thames crew won the Grand Challenge Cup again in 1929 and with Killick he won Silver Goblets again. In 1930, Beresford finished second to reigning Olympic champion Bobby Pearce in the single scull at the inaugural Empire/Commonwealth Games. In 1932 at Henley, Beresford competed in the coxless four which won the Stewards Challenge Cup and then went on to win the gold medal for Great Britain rowing at the 1932 Summer Olympics.

In the 1936 Summer Olympics in Berlin, Beresford was the flag bearer for the British delegation in the Opening Ceremonies, which were filmed by Leni Riefenstahl. The scene was included in her documentary Olympia, which is sometimes described as a Nazi propaganda film. Rowing at the 1936 Summer Olympics in Berlin, with Adolf Hitler watching, Beresford and Dick Southwood his partner in the Double sculls, came from a length down to pass the favoured Germans with just 200 metres to go, thus giving Beresford his fifth Olympic medal and third gold. Beresford would later write it was "the sweetest race I ever rowed." Beresford was presented with an oak sapling by Hitler, as were all gold medal winners. Beresford's was planted in the grounds of Bedford School.

In the inaugural Centenary Double Sculls – now the Double Sculls Challenge Cup – at Henley in 1939, Beresford, together with Dick Southwood, raced a memorable final against the European Champions, Scherli and Broschi of Trieste which resulted in a dead-heat.

Beresford was denied the opportunity to win a medal in the double sculls event in the 1940 Olympics as those Games were cancelled because of World War II.

== Later life ==
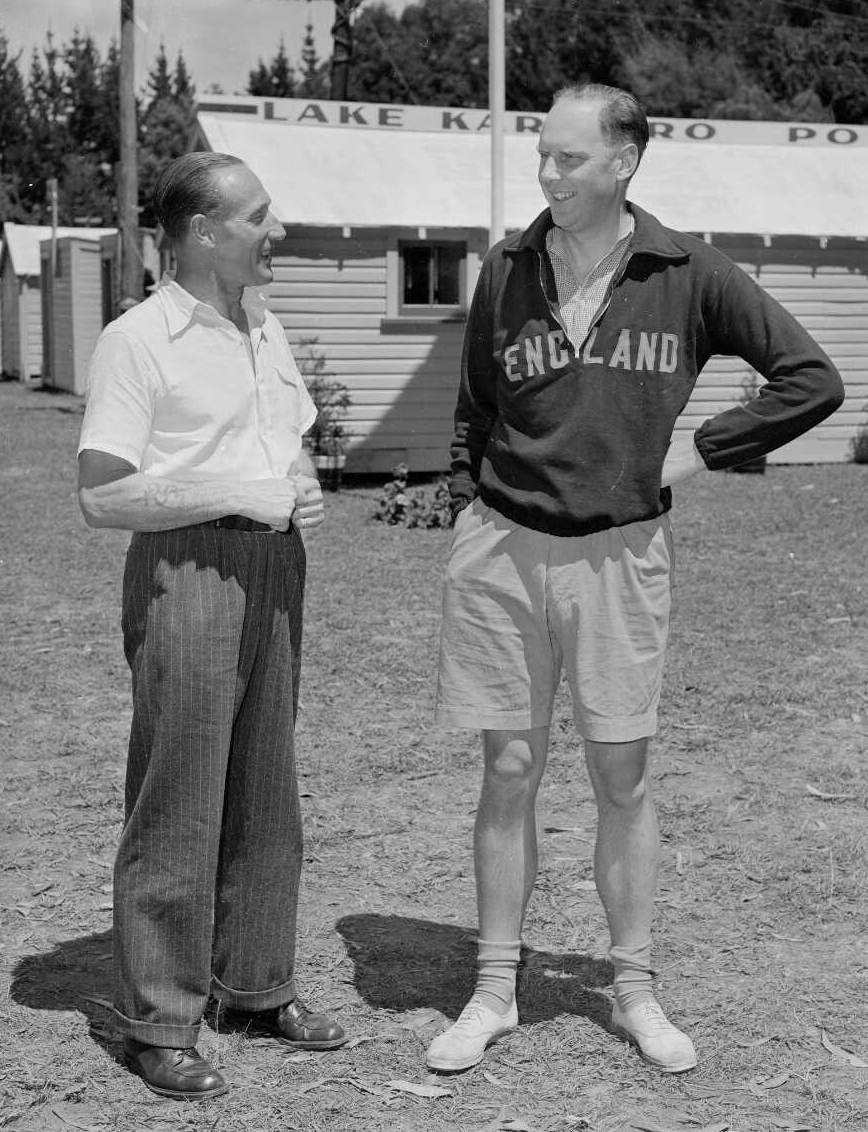
Beresford (left) and Dickie Burnell at the 1950 British Empire Games

Beresford was elected a Steward of Henley Royal Regatta in 1946. He was a member of the organising committee of the 1948 London Olympic Games. His contribution to rowing was recognised with two honours in the 1940s: the gold medal of the international rowing federation (1947), and the Olympic Diploma of Merit (1949). In 1960, Beresford was appointed a Commander of the Most Excellent Order of the British Empire. He was President of Thames Rowing Club from 1970 until his death in 1977.

In 2005, a Blue Plaque was erected by English Heritage at 19 Grove Park Gardens in Chiswick, West London which was Beresford's home from 1903 to 1940. Beresford is one of the first sportsmen to receive this honour.

== Achievements ==
- Olympic Medals: three gold, two silver
- First rower to compete at five Olympics with his 1936 Olympic appearance. This feat would be unmatched for forty years until Soviet rower Yuriy Lorentsson made his fifth Olympic appearance in 1976, and unsurpassed for another sixteen years until Czechoslovak rower Jiří Pták made his sixth Olympic appearance in 1992.
