= Angelo Polledri =

Italian coxswain

Personal information
- Born: 18 January 1904 Piacenza, Italy
- Died: 18 July 1997 (aged 93) Lodi, Lombardy, Italy
- Weight: 50 kg (110 lb)

Sport
- Sport: Rowing
- Club: SC Vittorino da Feltre, Piacenza
Medal record
Men's rowing
Representing Italy
European Rowing Championships
Gold medal – first place	1927 Como	Eight

Angelo Polledri (18 January 1904 – 18 July 1997) was an Italian coxswain.

Polledri was born in Piacenza in 1904. At the 1927 European Rowing Championships, he won gold with the men's eight. The same team competed at the 1928 Summer Olympics in Amsterdam where they were eliminated in the quarter-final. Polledri was the last survivor of the team and died on 18 July 1997.
