= Benjamin M. Miller =

American politician (1864–1944)

Benjamin Meek Miller
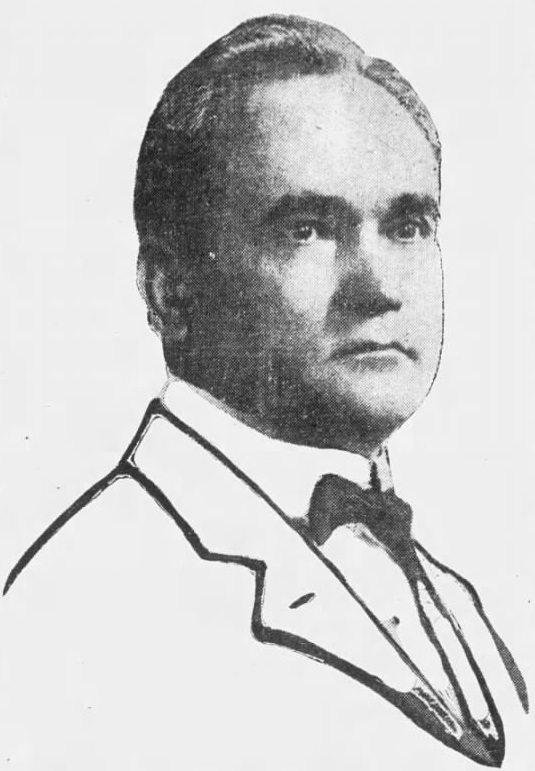
- Wilcox Progressive Era (Camden, AL), May 6, 1920

39th Governor of Alabama
- In office January 19, 1931 – January 14, 1935
- Lieutenant: Hugh D. Merrill
- Preceded by: Bibb Graves
- Succeeded by: Bibb Graves

Member of the Alabama House of Representatives
- In office 1888–1889

Personal details
- Born: March 13, 1864 Oak Hill, Alabama
- Died: February 6, 1944 (aged 79) Selma, Alabama
- Resting place: Camden Cemetery, Camden, Alabama
- Party: Democratic
- Education: University of Alabama; Erskine College
- Profession: Attorney, judge

Benjamin Meek Miller (March 13, 1864 – February 6, 1944) was an American Democratic politician who served as the 39th governor of Alabama from 1931 to 1935.

== Early life ==
Miller was born in Oak Hill, Wilcox County, Alabama, on March 13, 1864, to Rev. John Miller, D.D., and Sarah Pressly Miller. His father was pastor of the Bethel Associate Reformed Presbyterian Church at Oak Hill for 31 years. His mother was a descendant of the Hearst family of Abbeville County, South Carolina. He received his early education in Oak Hill and Camden, Alabama. He entered Erskine College, graduating in 1884. While a student at Erskine, he was a member of the Euphemian Literary Society. Upon his graduation from Erskine, he returned to Wilcox County, where he served as principal of the Lower Peach Tree Academy until 1887. He graduated from the University of Alabama School of Law in 1889. After graduating from law school, he established a law practice in Camden. On September 21, 1892, he married Margaret Otis Duggan of Mobile, Alabama. In 1890, he was a founding member of the Camden Associate Reformed Presbyterian Church. Miller was an avid reader. While governor he read numerous books, in categories as wide ranging as science fiction, drama, romance and history. He read Patrol by Philip MacDonald, The Land That Time Forgot by Edgar Rice Burroughs, The King of Elfland's Daughter by Lord Dunsany, The Battle to the Weak by Hilda Vaughan, Beau Geste by P. C. Wren and Witch Wood by John Buchan while he was governor. He welcomed Olympic gold medalists Richard Beesly, John Lander, Edward Vaughan Bevan and Michael Warriner to the University of Alabama to promote rowing at that school, all four of whom had competed for the United Kingdom in the 1928 Summer Olympics.

== Political life ==
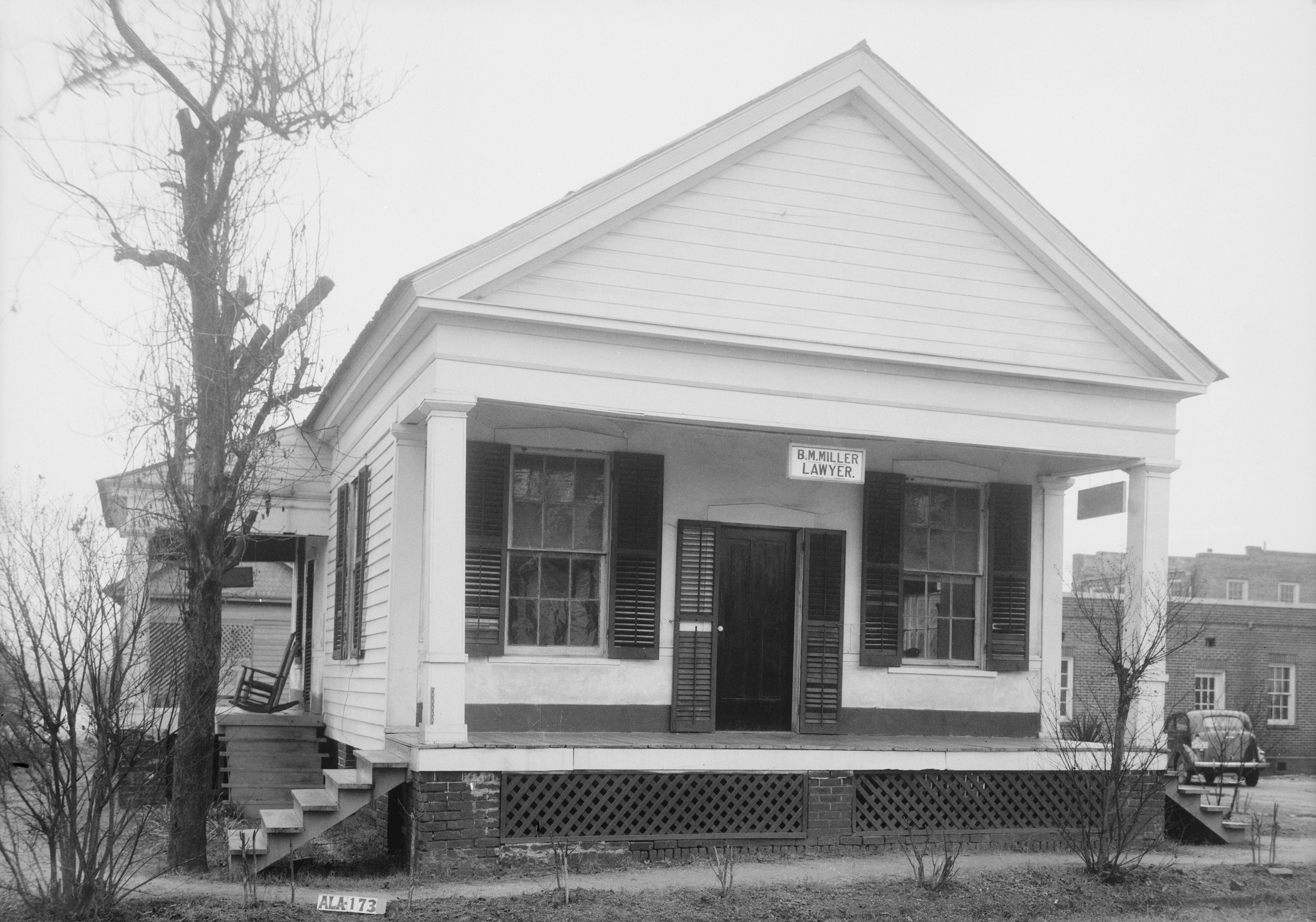
B. M. Miller's law office, Camden, Alabama, c. 1937

Miller represented Wilcox County in the Alabama House of Representatives from 1888 to 1889. He was elected judge of the Fourth Judicial Circuit of Alabama in 1904 and served until 1921. Miller was an associate justice of the Supreme Court of Alabama from 1921 to 1927. He sought reelection to the court in 1926 but was defeated by a candidate supported by the Ku Klux Klan.

In 1930, Miller sought the Alabama governorship. The Democratic primary pitted Miller against William C. Davis (his strongest opponent), Woolsey Finnell, Watt T. Brown, J.A. Carney, and Charles C. McCall. During the campaign, Miller attacked the reforms of the Bibb Graves administration and the political power of the Ku Klux Klan. Therefore, Miller's election as governor was a blow to the Klan.

When Miller was inaugurated as governor on January 19, 1931, the State of Alabama was $20,000,000.00 in debt. Miller considered reducing the state's debt the primary objective of his administration. After twice calling the Alabama Legislature into special session, Miller was able to secure an amendment to the Constitution of Alabama permitting the collection of state income tax. A state inheritance tax was passed along with the budget control act, which prohibited the State of Alabama from spending beyond incoming revenues. The salaries of state employees were also drastically reduced. Miller did not consider the income tax or budget control act his most significant achievement; instead, he felt the state bank holiday he declared in March 1933, eight days before Franklin D. Roosevelt declared a national bank holiday his greatest achievement.

In 1932, Miller commissioned Brookings Institution to study Alabama's state and local governments to achieve a more efficient government. However, the Alabama Legislature did not adopt most of the study's findings. During Miller's administration, the miles of paved roads in Alabama doubled, and all highway work was paid in cash.

Miller was known for his frugality, and he shocked many in Montgomery when he brought his milk cow from Camden to the Alabama Governor's Mansion.

After leaving the governor's office in 1935, Miller returned to Camden, where he resumed law practice. He died at his daughter's residence in Selma, Alabama, on February 6, 1944, and is buried in the Camden Cemetery in Camden, Alabama. Margaret Duggan Miller preceded her husband in death on February 16, 1934, and is also buried in the Camden Cemetery.

Party political offices
Preceded by Bibb Graves	Democratic nominee for Governor of Alabama; 1930	Succeeded by Bibb Graves
Political offices
Preceded by Bibb Graves	Governor of Alabama; 1931–1935	Succeeded by Bibb Graves
