= Rowing at the 1928 Summer Olympics – Men's coxless four =

Men's coxless four at the Games of the IX Olympiad
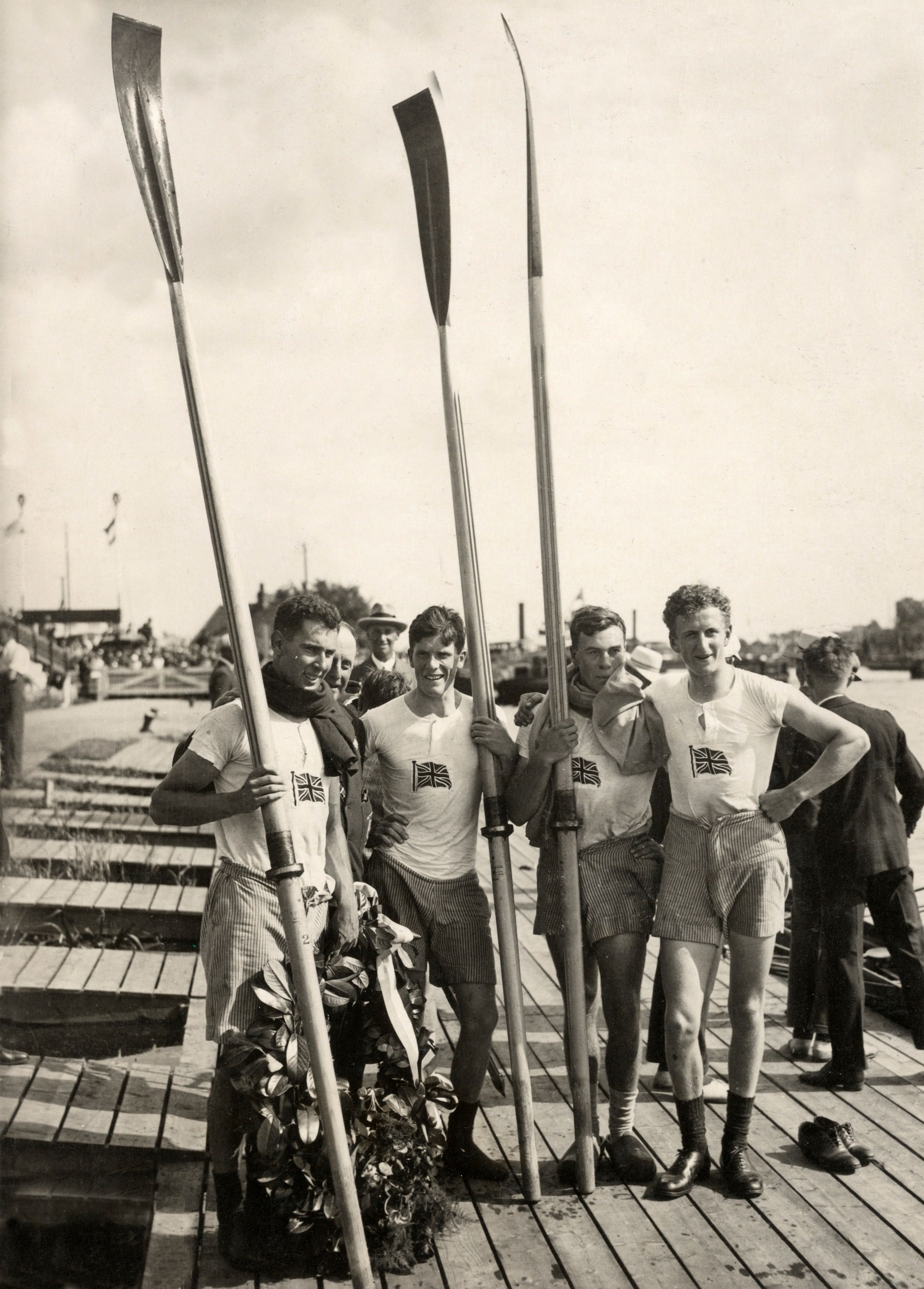
- Winning British men's coxless four team at the 1928 Olympics
- Venue: Sloten
- Competitors: 24 from 6 nations

Medalists
1st place, gold medalist(s)		Great Britain; John Lander, Michael Warriner, Richard Beesly, Edward Vaughan Bevan
2nd place, silver medalist(s)		United States; Charles Karle, William Miller, George Healis, Ernest Bayer
3rd place, bronze medalist(s)		Italy; Cesare Rossi, Pietro Freschi, Umberto Bonadè, Paolo Gennari

The men's coxless four event was part of the rowing programme at the 1928 Summer Olympics. It was one of seven rowing events for men and was the fourth appearance of the event.

== Results ==
Source: Official results; De Wael

=== Round 1 ===
Winners advanced to the second round. Losers competed in the first repechage.

Heat 1
Rank	Rowers	Nation	Time	Qual.
1	Cesare Rossi, Pietro Freschi, Umberto Bonadè, Paolo Gennari	Italy	7:24.6	Q2
2	Simon Bon, Egbertus Waller, Ansco Dokkum, Paul Maasland	Netherlands	7:35.8	R1

Heat 2
Rank	Rowers	Nation	Time	Qual.
1	Charles Karle, William Miller, George Healis, Ernest Bayer	United States	7:16.8	Q2
2	Heinrich Zänker, Wolfgang Goedecke, Günter Roll, Werner Zschiesche	Germany	7:21.0	R1

Heat 3
Rank	Rowers	Nation	Time	Qual.
1	John Lander, Michael Warriner, Richard Beesly, Edward Vaughan Bevan	Great Britain	7:44.2	Q2
2	Henri Bonzano, Albert Bonzano, Émile Lecuirot, Louis Devillié	France	7:58.2	R1

==== Repechage 1 ====
Winners advanced to the second round, but were ineligible for a second repechage if they lost there. Losers were eliminated.

Heat 1
Rank	Rowers	Nation	Time	Qual.
1	Heinrich Zänker, Wolfgang Goedecke, Günter Roll, Werner Zschiesche	Germany	7:21.4	Q2
2	Simon Bon, Egbertus Waller, Ansco Dokkum, Paul Maasland	Netherlands	7:30.2	elim.

Heat 2
Rank	Rowers	Nation	Time	Qual.
1	Henri Bonzano, Albert Bonzano, Émile Lecuirot, Louis Devillié	France	7:52.0	Q2

=== Round 2 ===
Winners advanced to the semifinals. Losers competed in the second repechage, if they had advanced by winning in the first round, or were eliminated if they had advanced through the first repechage.

Heat 1
Rank	Rowers	Nation	Time	Qual.
1	John Lander, Michael Warriner, Richard Beesly, Edward Vaughan Bevan	Great Britain	6:42.4	Q
2	Heinrich Zänker, Wolfgang Goedecke, Günter Roll, Werner Zschiesche	Germany		elim.

Heat 2
Rank	Rowers	Nation	Time	Qual.
1	Charles Karle, William Miller, George Healis, Ernest Bayer	United States	7:12.6	Q
–	Henri Bonzano, Albert Bonzano, Émile Lecuirot, Louis Devillié	France	DNS	elim.

Heat 3
Rank	Rowers	Nation	Time	Qual.
1	Cesare Rossi, Pietro Freschi, Umberto Bonadè, Paolo Gennari	Italy	7:01.6	Q

=== Semifinals ===
Winners advanced to the gold medal final, with the loser taking the bronze medal.

Heat 1
Rank	Rowers	Body politic	Time	Qual.
1	Charles Karle, William Miller, George Healis, Ernest Bayer	United States	6:29.4	Q
2 ( (bronze) )	Cesare Rossi, Pietro Freschi, Umberto Bonadè, Paolo Gennari	Italy	6:31.6	

Heat 2
Rank	Rowers	Nation	Time	Qual.
1	John Lander, Michael Warriner, Richard Beesly, Edward Vaughan Bevan	Great Britain	6:42.4	Q

=== Finals ===
Gold medal final
Rank	Rowers	Nation	Time
1st place, gold medalist(s)	John Lander, Michael Warriner, Richard Beesly, Edward Vaughan Bevan	Great Britain	6:36.0
2nd place, silver medalist(s)	Charles Karle, William Miller, George Healis, Ernest Bayer	United States	6:37.0
