= Bonzano =

Bonzano is a surname. Notable people with the surname include:

- Albert Bonzano (1905–1985), French rower
- Giovanni Bonzano (1867–1927), Italian cardinal
- Henri Bonzano (1903–1995), French rower
- Maximilian F. Bonzano (1821–1894), German-born American government official, politician, and physician
