= Goedecke =

Goedecke is a German language surname from the personal name Gottfried. Notable people with the name include:

- Friedrich Wilhelm von Goedecke (1771–1857), German soldier and politician in Dutch-Luxembourg service
- Wolfgang Goedecke (1906–1942), German rower
