= Sailing at the 1920 Summer Olympics – 6.5 Metre =

6.5 Metre at the Games of the VII Olympiad
- Line drawing of the 6.5 Metre
- Venue: Belgium, Ostend
- Dates: First race: 7 July 1920; Last race: 9 July 1920
- Competitors: 2 from 2 nations
- Teams: 6

Medalists
1st place, gold medalist(s)		Joop Carp, Berend Carp, Petrus Wernink	Netherlands
2nd place, silver medalist(s)		Albert Weil, Robert Monier, Félix Picon	France

The 6.5 Metre was a sailing event on the Sailing at the 1920 Summer Olympics program in Ostend. Four races were scheduled. 6 sailors, on 2 boats, from 2 nation entered.

== Race schedule ==
●	Opening ceremony	●	Event competitions	●	Event finals	●	Closing ceremony

Date	July			
Date	7th Wed	8th Thu	9th Fri	10th Sat
6.5 Metre	●	●	●	●
Total gold medals				1

== Course area ==
6.5 Metre 1920 Olympic Course Areas

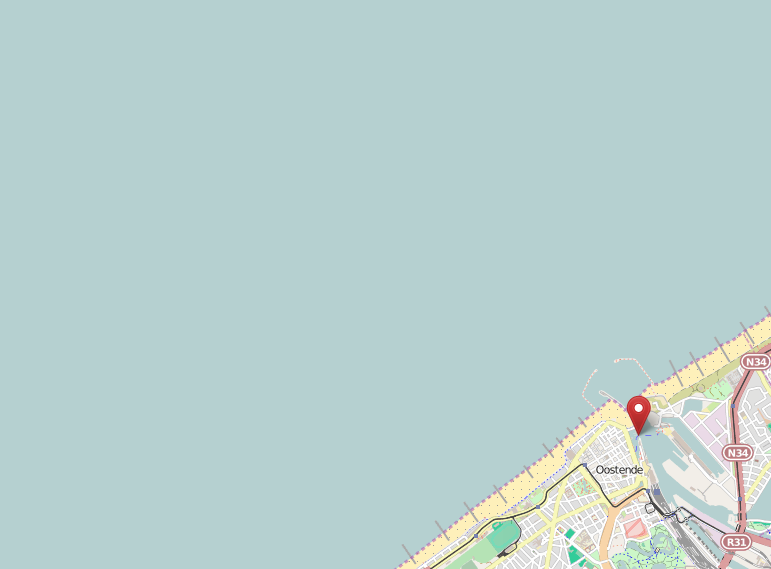
Ostend, Belgium

== Weather conditions ==
Date	Max temperature	Wind speed	Average wind direction
7 July 1920	Unknown		
8 July 1920	Unknown		
9 July 1920	Unknown		

== Final results ==
The 1920 Olympic scoring system was used. All competitors were male.

Rank	Country	Helmsman	Crew	Boat	Race 1		Race 2		Race 3		Total
Rank	Country	Helmsman	Crew	Boat	Pos.	Pts.	Pos.	Pts.	Pos.	Pts.	Total
1st place, gold medalist(s)	Netherlands	Joop Carp	Berend Carp; Petrus Wernink	Oranje	CAN	0	1	1	1	1	2
2nd place, silver medalist(s)	France	Albert Weil	Robert Monier; Félix Picon	Rose Pompon	CAN	0	2	2	2	2	4

Legend: CAN – Race cancelled;

== Daily standings ==
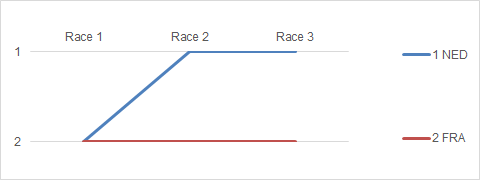
Graph showing the daily standings in the 6.5 Metre during the 1920 Summer Olympics

== Notes ==
- The first race on July 7 was canceled/postponed on request of the Dutch team since the France yacht was not in time cleared by Belgium customs

== Other information ==
=== Sailors ===
During the Sailing regattas at the 1920 Summer Olympics among others the following persons were competing in the various classes:

6.5 Metre sailors at the 1920 Olympic Games
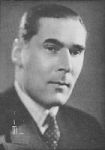
Joop Carp

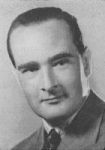
Berend Carp
