= Selma Times-Journal =

Newspaper in Selma, Alabama, U.S.

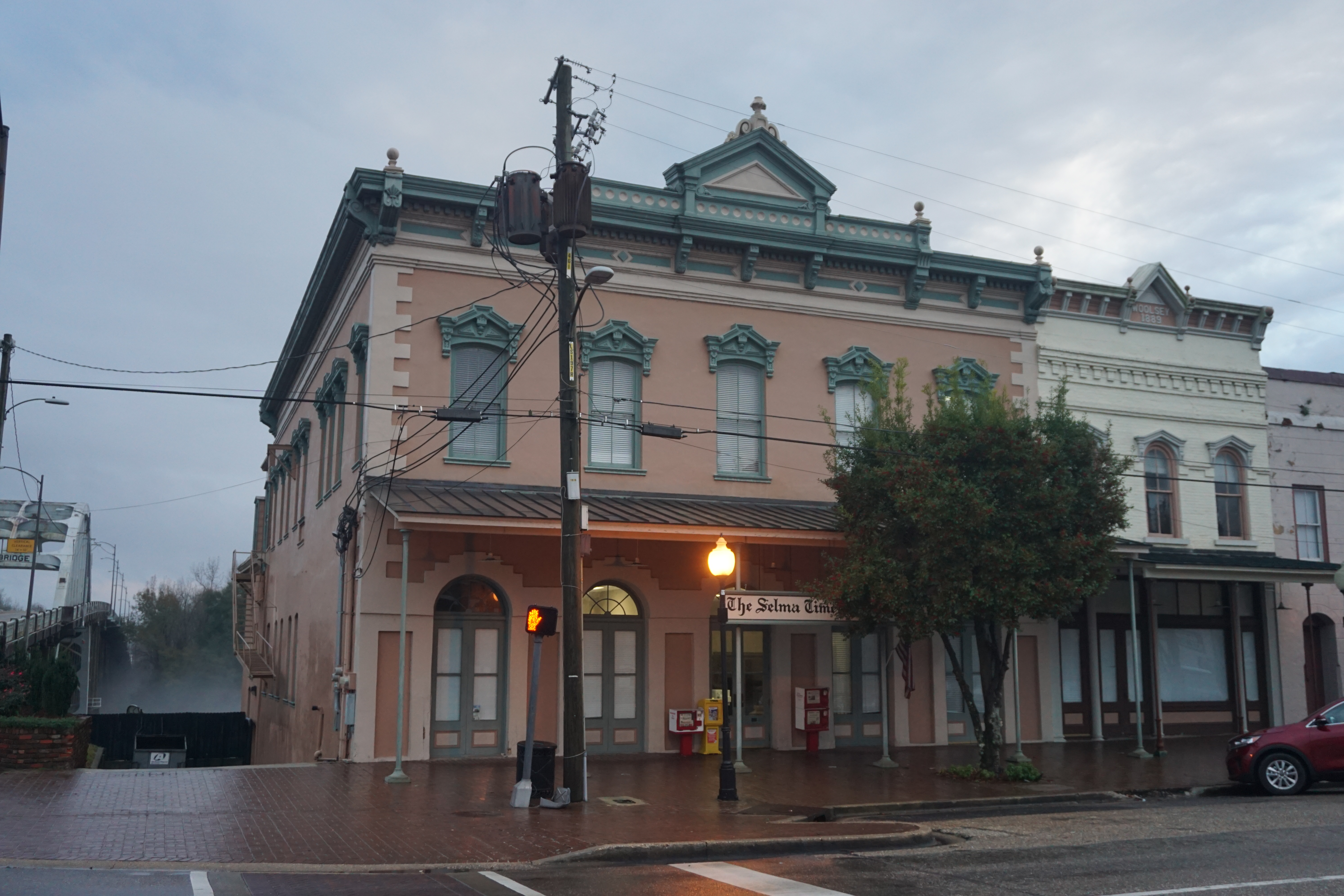
- Selma Times-Journal building
- Type: Weekly newspaper
- Owner: Boone Newspapers Inc.
- Editor: James Jones
- Founded: 1827
- Language: English
- OCLC number: 1080316481
- Website: selmatimesjournal.com

The Selma Times-Journal, is a weekly newspaper located in Selma, Alabama. It publishes every Wednesday. It is owned by Tuscaloosa, Alabama-based Boone Newspapers Inc.

== History ==
The paper was founded as the Selma Courier on November 2, 1827, by Thomas Jefferson Frow.

The newspaper was later known by various names, including the Selma Free Press, Selma Reporter, and Selma Daily News. During the American Civil War, the newspaper's press was torched by Union Army troops following the Battle of Selma (see Selma, Alabama in the American Civil War). The paper then merged with the weekly Selma Messenger to form the Times Messenger. The paper then merged with the Selma Argus (becoming the Times-Argus), and then with the Selma Evening Mail (becoming the Selma Times). In 1889, the paper changed its name to the Morning Times. In 1914, Frazier Titus Raiford purchased the Selma Times, and on March 1, 1920, the paper merged with the Selma Journal to become the Selma Times-Journal. Frazier Titus Raiford and his wife Mary Howard Raiford served as editors and publishers until Frazier died in 1936. Mary Raiford—Alabama's only female publisher—then ran the paper by herself for 23 years.

In 1923, the paper editorialized against the Ku Klux Klan, writing, "Selma has no room within her confines for that ugly, malevolent institution of the devil known as Ku Kluxism." In the later 1920s, the paper denounced James Thomas Heflin and his anti-Catholic demagoguery. In the 1930 election for governor, the paper supported the candidacy of Judge Benjamin M. Miller, "a noted foe of lynching and the Klan" and a supporter of Democratic presidential nominee Al Smith.

During the civil rights movement, the Times-Journal attempted to provide balanced reporting, unlike many other Southern newspapers of the era. Nevertheless, the paper did publish "advertisements from the local White Citizens' Councils that included veiled threats and ... other advertisements purportedly showing Dr. Martin Luther King Jr. at a communist training session." The paper provided meaningful coverage of the Selma to Montgomery marches. Journalists Gene Roberts and Hank Klibanoff, in their book The Race Beat: The Press, the Civil Rights Struggle, and the Awakening of a Nation, wrote: "Selma had something most other venues of civil rights activity did not: a local newspaper that visiting reporters could depend on. The Selma Times-Journal saw the historic importance of the story and took its responsibility seriously, providing detailed accounts that reporters found reliable."

Kathryn Tucker Windham, a writer and storyteller, was a journalist and photographer with the Times-Journal in the mid-20th century, writing the column "Around our House" from 1950 to 1966.
