= 1968 United States presidential election in Virginia =

- November 5, 1968
- Turnout: 50.1% (voting age)

Nominee	Richard Nixon	Hubert Humphrey	George Wallace
Party	Republican	Democratic	American Independent
Home state	New York (Note: Although he was born in California and he served as a U.S. senator from California, in 1968 Richard Nixon's official state of residence was New York, because he moved there to practice law after his defeat in the 1962 California gubernatorial election. During his first term as president, Nixon re-established his residency in California. Consequently, most reliable reference books list Nixon's home state as New York in the 1968 election and his home state as California in the 1972 (and 1960) election.)	Minnesota	Alabama
Running mate	Spiro Agnew	Edmund Muskie	Curtis LeMay
Electoral vote	12	0	0
Popular vote	590,319	442,387	320,272
Percentage	43.41%	32.53%	23.55%

Nixon
30–40%
40–50%
50–60%
60–70%
70–80%
Humphrey
30–40%
40–50%
50–60%
70–80%
Wallace
30–40%
40–50%
50–60%
President before election
Lyndon B. Johnson
Democratic
Elected President
Richard Nixon
Republican

The 1968 United States presidential election in Virginia took place on November 5, 1968. All 50 states and the District of Columbia were part of the 1968 United States presidential election. Virginia voters chose twelve electors to the Electoral College, which selected the president and vice president of the United States.

For over sixty years Virginia had had the most restricted electorate in the United States due to a cumulative poll tax and literacy tests. Virginia would be almost entirely controlled by the conservative Democratic Byrd Organization for four decades, although during the organization's last twenty years of controlling the state it would direct many Virginia voters away from the national Democratic Party due to opposition to black civil rights and to the fiscal liberalism of the New Deal. After the Twenty-Fourth Amendment and Harper v. Virginia State Board of Elections, the state's electorate would substantially expand, since the lower classes were no longer burdened by poll taxes. At the same time, the postwar Republican trend of the Northeast-aligned Washington D.C. and Richmond suburbs, which had begun as early as 1944, would accelerate and become intensified by the mobilisation of working-class Piedmont whites against a national Democratic Party strongly associated with black interests.

== Campaign ==
Among white voters, 51% supported Nixon, 28% supported Wallace, and 21% supported Humphrey. The Virginia Conservative Party, a pro-segregationist political party in a 1967 party convention, unanimously named George Wallace as president and Ronald Reagan as vice president. Neither Wallace nor Reagan wanted to be on their ticket. Wallace did not like the idea, as he thought it would take away votes from his party, and efforts were made to remove them. This was eventually successful, but the Conservative Party did support Wallace in the end.

=== Predictions ===
The following newspapers gave these predictions about how Virginia would vote in the 1968 presidential election:

Source	Ranking	As of
Fort Worth Star-Telegram	Tossup	September 14, 1968
Pensacola News Journal	Tilt R (flip)	September 23, 1968
Daily Press	Lean R (flip)	October 11, 1968
The Charlotte News	Likely R (flip)	October 12, 1968
Shreveport Times	Lean R (flip)	November 3, 1968
The Selma Times-Journal	Likely R (flip)	November 3, 1968
The Roanoke Times	Likely R (flip)	November 3, 1968
Fort Lauderdale News	Likely R (flip)	November 4, 1968

== Analysis ==
Virginia was won by Republican nominee and former Vice President Richard Nixon of California with 43.41 percent of the vote, against incumbent Vice President Hubert Humphrey of Minnesota with 32.53 percent and former Alabama Governor George Wallace who gained 23.55 percent. Nixon also won the national election with 43.42 percent of the vote. Regardless, all candidates had strong regional support in the state; Nixon's votes came mostly from Northern Virginia and the Appalachian Mountain areas, while Humphrey's votes were mainly from the Tidewater region and unionized coal counties in Southwest Virginia, which had both benefited from increased voter registration under the Voting Rights Act and been centres of opposition to the Byrd Organization in previous generations. Wallace received his core support in the Southern Virginia counties, where the core of Byrd machine power had been located.

As of the 2024 presidential election, this is the last occasion when Powhatan County voted for a Democratic presidential candidate. It is also the last occasion when Lunenburg County, Mecklenburg County and Pittsylvania County have not voted for the Republican nominee. Essex County would not vote Democratic again until 1996, and James City County would not vote Democratic again until 2020.

Nixon's victory was the first of ten consecutive Republican victories in the state, as Virginia would not vote for a Democratic candidate again until Barack Obama in 2008. Since 2008, Virginia has always voted for the Democratic presidential candidate.

== Results ==
1968 United States presidential election in Virginia
Party	Candidate	Votes	Percentage	Electoral votes
Republican	Richard Nixon	590,319	43.41%	12
Democratic	Hubert Humphrey	442,387	32.53%	0
American Independent	George Wallace	320,272	23.55%	0
Socialist Labor	Henning A. Blomen	4,671	0.34%	0
Peace and Freedom	Dick Gregory	1,680	0.12%	0
Prohibition	E. Harold Munn	599	0.04%	0
Totals		1,359,928	100.00%	12

=== Results by county or independent city ===
County or city	Richard Nixon Republican		Hubert Humphrey Democratic		George Wallace American Independent		Other candidates Various parties		Margin		Total votes cast
County or city	#	%	#	%	#	%	#	%	#	%	Total votes cast
Accomack	3,231	35.19%	2,467	26.87%	3,460	37.69%	23	0.25%	-229 (Note: In this county or city where Humphrey ran third behind Wallace, margin given is Nixon vote total minus Wallace vote total.)	-2.50%	9,181
Albemarle	4,512	53.45%	2,255	26.71%	1,657	19.63%	17	0.20%	2,257	26.74%	8,441
Alexandria	13,265	41.69%	14,351	45.11%	4,131	12.98%	69	0.22%	-1,086	-3.42%	31,816
Alleghany	1,649	43.47%	988	26.05%	1,153	30.40%	3	0.08%	496	13.07%	3,793
Amelia	857	33.90%	830	32.83%	832	32.91%	9	0.36%	25	0.99%	2,528
Amherst	2,656	39.80%	1,543	23.12%	2,449	36.69%	26	0.39%	207	3.11%	6,674
Appomattox	1,753	43.42%	756	18.73%	1,512	37.45%	16	0.40%	241	5.97%	4,037
Arlington	28,163	45.92%	26,107	42.57%	6,746	11.00%	310	0.51%	2,056	3.35%	61,326
Augusta	6,313	57.92%	2,028	18.61%	2,483	22.78%	76	0.70%	3,830	35.14%	10,900
Bath	872	45.97%	494	26.04%	529	27.89%	2	0.11%	343	18.08%	1,897
Bedford	2,807	35.80%	1,574	20.08%	3,316	42.30%	143	1.82%	-509	-6.50%	7,840
Bedford City	1,047	43.99%	569	23.91%	679	28.53%	85	3.57%	368	15.46%	2,380
Bland	938	50.38%	560	30.08%	361	19.39%	3	0.16%	378	20.30%	1,862
Botetourt	2,598	50.54%	1,272	24.75%	1,267	24.65%	3	0.06%	1,326	25.79%	5,140
Bristol	1,930	44.09%	1,531	34.98%	911	20.81%	5	0.11%	399	9.11%	4,377
Brunswick	1,139	22.13%	1,910	37.11%	2,088	40.57%	10	0.19%	-178 (Note: In this county or city where Nixon ran third behind Wallace, margin given is Humphrey vote minus Wallace vote.)	-3.46%	5,147
Buchanan	3,699	37.68%	5,003	50.97%	1,067	10.87%	47	0.48%	-1,304	-13.29%	9,816
Buckingham	1,027	32.05%	984	30.71%	1,185	36.99%	8	0.25%	-158	-4.94%	3,204
Buena Vista	814	49.04%	387	23.31%	456	27.47%	3	0.18%	358	21.57%	1,660
Campbell	5,731	44.73%	1,996	15.58%	4,425	34.54%	659	5.14%	1,306	10.19%	12,811
Caroline	1,162	26.25%	2,165	48.92%	1,084	24.49%	15	0.34%	-1,003	-22.67%	4,426
Carroll	4,909	64.16%	1,773	23.17%	958	12.52%	11	0.14%	3,136	40.99%	7,651
Charles City	320	16.33%	1,457	74.34%	176	8.98%	7	0.36%	-1,137	-58.01%	1,960
Charlotte	1,042	24.43%	1,045	24.50%	2,163	50.72%	15	0.35%	-1,118	-26.22%	4,265
Charlottesville	5,601	49.41%	3,831	33.80%	1,781	15.71%	122	1.08%	1,770	15.61%	11,335
Chesapeake	6,234	25.18%	6,843	27.64%	11,084	44.77%	599	2.42%	-4,241	-17.13%	24,760
Chesterfield	22,015	56.03%	5,715	14.54%	11,504	29.28%	58	0.15%	10,511	26.75%	39,292
Clarke	1,127	42.62%	768	29.05%	742	28.06%	7	0.26%	359	13.57%	2,644
Clifton Forge	925	43.59%	734	34.59%	462	21.77%	1	0.05%	191	9.00%	2,122
Colonial Heights	2,650	48.96%	650	12.01%	2,106	38.91%	7	0.13%	544	10.05%	5,413
Covington	1,551	43.14%	1,195	33.24%	846	23.53%	3	0.08%	356	9.90%	3,595
Craig	581	46.18%	419	33.31%	256	20.35%	2	0.16%	162	12.87%	1,258
Culpeper	2,229	47.49%	1,239	26.40%	1,217	25.93%	9	0.19%	990	21.09%	4,694
Cumberland	844	34.70%	978	40.21%	602	24.75%	8	0.33%	-134	-5.51%	2,432
Danville	6,796	40.27%	4,495	26.64%	5,391	31.95%	192	1.14%	1,405	8.32%	16,874
Dickenson	3,412	46.01%	3,355	45.25%	639	8.62%	9	0.12%	57	0.76%	7,415
Dinwiddie	1,451	27.60%	1,551	29.50%	2,245	42.70%	10	0.19%	-694	-13.20%	5,257
Emporia	812	37.06%	657	29.99%	716	32.68%	6	0.27%	96	4.38%	2,191
Essex	791	36.55%	897	41.45%	468	21.63%	8	0.37%	-106	-4.90%	2,164
Fairfax	57,462	48.98%	44,796	38.18%	14,805	12.62%	256	0.22%	12,666	10.80%	117,319
Fairfax City	2,963	48.70%	2,153	35.39%	959	15.76%	9	0.15%	810	13.31%	6,084
Falls Church	2,005	45.76%	1,860	42.45%	504	11.50%	13	0.30%	145	3.31%	4,382
Fauquier	2,845	43.76%	2,099	32.29%	1,536	23.63%	21	0.32%	746	11.47%	6,501
Floyd	2,275	64.32%	715	20.21%	537	15.18%	10	0.28%	1,560	44.11%	3,537
Fluvanna	913	42.56%	569	26.53%	660	30.77%	3	0.14%	253	11.79%	2,145
Franklin	3,036	36.54%	2,025	24.37%	3,219	38.75%	28	0.34%	-183	-2.21%	8,308
Franklin City	951	42.15%	792	35.11%	511	22.65%	2	0.09%	159	7.04%	2,256
Frederick	3,696	49.58%	1,612	21.63%	2,137	28.67%	9	0.12%	1,559	20.91%	7,454
Fredericksburg	2,142	42.27%	2,036	40.17%	878	17.32%	12	0.24%	106	2.10%	5,068
Galax	1,257	54.44%	748	32.39%	304	13.17%	0	0.00%	509	22.05%	2,309
Giles	2,722	43.36%	2,045	32.58%	1,372	21.86%	138	2.20%	677	10.78%	6,277
Gloucester	1,619	37.10%	1,210	27.73%	1,526	34.97%	9	0.21%	93	2.13%	4,364
Goochland	1,216	35.13%	1,389	40.13%	836	24.15%	20	0.58%	-173	-5.00%	3,461
Grayson	3,563	54.09%	1,926	29.24%	1,090	16.55%	8	0.12%	1,637	24.85%	6,587
Greene	856	55.26%	255	16.46%	433	27.95%	5	0.32%	423	27.31%	1,549
Greensville	529	16.71%	1,367	43.19%	1,256	39.68%	13	0.41%	111	3.51%	3,165
Halifax	2,634	28.94%	2,199	24.16%	4,235	46.53%	34	0.37%	-1,601	-17.59%	9,102
Hampton	10,532	32.30%	11,308	34.68%	10,690	32.79%	76	0.23%	618	1.89%	32,606
Hanover	5,425	50.01%	2,079	19.17%	3,330	30.70%	13	0.12%	2,095	19.31%	10,847
Harrisonburg	2,859	65.69%	1,036	23.81%	453	10.41%	4	0.09%	1,823	41.88%	4,352
Henrico	34,212	62.52%	8,600	15.71%	11,868	21.69%	46	0.08%	22,344	40.83%	54,726
Henry	3,946	25.92%	4,175	27.42%	6,802	44.68%	301	1.98%	-2,627	-17.26%	15,224
Highland	619	57.90%	284	26.57%	166	15.53%	0	0.00%	335	31.33%	1,069
Hopewell	2,942	43.63%	1,568	23.25%	2,092	31.02%	141	2.09%	850	12.61%	6,743
Isle of Wight	1,312	23.28%	1,977	35.08%	2,328	41.31%	18	0.32%	-351	-6.23%	5,635
James City	1,443	35.50%	1,521	37.42%	1,083	26.64%	18	0.44%	-78	-1.92%	4,065
King and Queen	568	27.40%	882	42.55%	614	29.62%	9	0.43%	268	12.93%	2,073
King George	829	37.77%	730	33.26%	632	28.79%	4	0.18%	99	4.51%	2,195
King William	1,046	43.03%	764	31.43%	615	25.30%	6	0.25%	282	11.60%	2,431
Lancaster	1,640	44.93%	1,134	31.07%	876	24.00%	0	0.00%	506	13.86%	3,650
Lee	4,450	47.35%	4,105	43.67%	827	8.80%	17	0.18%	345	3.68%	9,399
Lexington	1,170	56.12%	734	35.20%	177	8.49%	4	0.19%	436	20.92%	2,085
Loudoun	4,577	45.91%	3,262	32.72%	2,117	21.23%	14	0.14%	1,315	13.19%	9,970
Louisa	1,510	38.09%	1,290	32.54%	1,149	28.99%	15	0.38%	220	5.55%	3,964
Lunenburg	1,181	29.44%	1,180	29.41%	1,630	40.63%	21	0.52%	-449	-11.19%	4,012
Lynchburg	9,943	54.34%	4,305	23.53%	3,649	19.94%	402	2.20%	5,638	30.81%	18,299
Madison	1,188	48.71%	478	19.60%	763	31.28%	10	0.41%	425	17.43%	2,439
Martinsville	2,618	35.98%	2,727	37.48%	1,856	25.51%	75	1.03%	-109	-1.50%	7,276
Mathews	1,309	47.14%	691	24.88%	773	27.84%	4	0.14%	536	19.30%	2,777
Mecklenburg	2,750	29.01%	2,667	28.14%	4,022	42.44%	39	0.41%	-1,272	-13.43%	9,478
Middlesex	809	39.62%	575	28.16%	655	32.08%	3	0.15%	154	7.54%	2,042
Montgomery	7,098	61.47%	2,700	23.38%	1,712	14.83%	37	0.32%	4,398	38.09%	11,547
Nansemond	2,101	20.94%	4,174	41.60%	3,723	37.11%	35	0.35%	451	4.49%	10,033
Nelson	1,130	32.98%	1,120	32.69%	1,163	33.95%	13	0.38%	-33	-0.97%	3,426
New Kent	526	27.63%	765	40.18%	609	31.99%	4	0.21%	156	8.19%	1,904
Newport News	12,774	34.46%	13,370	36.07%	10,763	29.04%	162	0.44%	-596	-1.61%	37,069
Norfolk	22,302	33.88%	28,477	43.26%	14,500	22.03%	550	0.84%	-6,175	-9.38%	65,829
Northampton	1,410	35.48%	1,418	35.68%	1,129	28.41%	17	0.43%	-8	-0.20%	3,974
Northumberland	1,438	41.18%	1,077	30.84%	968	27.72%	9	0.26%	361	10.34%	3,492
Norton	495	39.07%	555	43.80%	215	16.97%	2	0.16%	-60	-4.73%	1,267
Nottoway	1,614	33.42%	1,529	31.66%	1,673	34.64%	14	0.29%	-59	-1.22%	4,830
Orange	1,727	47.17%	879	24.01%	1,050	28.68%	5	0.14%	677	18.49%	3,661
Page	3,667	53.93%	2,125	31.25%	995	14.63%	13	0.19%	1,542	22.68%	6,800
Patrick	2,187	41.46%	1,105	20.95%	1,974	37.42%	9	0.17%	213	4.04%	5,275
Petersburg	3,478	31.14%	5,519	49.41%	2,158	19.32%	14	0.13%	-2,041	-18.27%	11,169
Pittsylvania	5,096	25.62%	5,427	27.29%	9,302	46.77%	65	0.33%	-3,875	-19.48%	19,890
Portsmouth	9,402	25.15%	15,734	42.09%	12,127	32.44%	118	0.32%	3,607	9.65%	37,381
Powhatan	722	27.11%	1,004	37.70%	929	34.89%	8	0.30%	75	2.81%	2,663
Prince Edward	1,857	39.80%	1,567	33.58%	1,224	26.23%	18	0.39%	290	6.22%	4,666
Prince George	1,559	32.75%	1,272	26.72%	1,920	40.33%	10	0.21%	-361	-7.58%	4,761
Prince William	7,944	42.51%	5,566	29.79%	5,160	27.61%	16	0.09%	2,378	12.72%	18,686
Pulaski	4,409	53.35%	2,497	30.21%	1,346	16.29%	13	0.16%	1,912	23.14%	8,265
Radford	2,077	55.40%	1,206	32.17%	461	12.30%	5	0.13%	871	23.23%	3,749
Rappahannock	594	43.58%	394	28.91%	372	27.29%	3	0.22%	200	14.67%	1,363
Richmond	1,011	48.86%	490	23.68%	563	27.21%	5	0.24%	448	21.65%	2,069
Richmond City	26,380	39.57%	32,857	49.28%	7,325	10.99%	106	0.16%	-6,477	-9.71%	66,668
Roanoke	12,439	58.89%	3,902	18.47%	4,745	22.46%	38	0.18%	7,694	36.43%	21,124
Roanoke City	15,368	51.21%	9,281	30.93%	5,269	17.56%	90	0.30%	6,087	20.28%	30,008
Rockbridge	2,280	56.80%	845	21.05%	885	22.05%	4	0.10%	1,395	34.75%	4,014
Rockingham	7,779	66.40%	2,111	18.02%	1,817	15.51%	8	0.07%	5,668	48.38%	11,715
Russell	3,858	43.49%	3,554	40.06%	1,369	15.43%	91	1.03%	304	3.43%	8,872
Salem	3,955	57.77%	1,369	20.00%	1,507	22.01%	15	0.22%	2,448	35.76%	6,846
Scott	5,345	53.54%	3,144	31.49%	1,474	14.76%	21	0.21%	2,201	22.05%	9,984
Shenandoah	5,461	62.91%	1,654	19.05%	1,561	17.98%	5	0.06%	3,807	43.86%	8,681
Smyth	5,297	54.32%	2,631	26.98%	1,808	18.54%	15	0.15%	2,666	27.34%	9,751
South Boston	1,298	50.17%	620	23.97%	662	25.59%	7	0.27%	636	24.58%	2,587
Southampton	1,376	26.15%	1,803	34.26%	2,070	39.34%	13	0.25%	-267	-5.08%	5,262
Spotsylvania	1,675	34.00%	1,647	33.43%	1,589	32.26%	15	0.30%	28	0.57%	4,926
Stafford	2,572	39.68%	1,698	26.20%	2,197	33.89%	15	0.23%	375	5.79%	6,482
Staunton	4,434	61.40%	1,729	23.94%	1,054	14.60%	4	0.06%	2,705	37.46%	7,221
Suffolk	1,277	37.95%	1,044	31.03%	1,039	30.88%	5	0.15%	233	6.92%	3,365
Surry	523	22.10%	1,126	47.59%	708	29.92%	9	0.38%	418	17.67%	2,366
Sussex	1,105	29.12%	1,541	40.62%	1,135	29.92%	13	0.34%	406	10.70%	3,794
Tazewell	4,434	39.11%	4,734	41.75%	2,023	17.84%	147	1.30%	-300	-2.64%	11,338
Virginia Beach	16,316	43.23%	10,101	26.76%	10,962	29.04%	363	0.96%	5,354	14.19%	37,742
Warren	2,297	43.37%	1,513	28.57%	1,479	27.93%	7	0.13%	784	14.80%	5,296
Washington	6,665	51.16%	3,243	24.89%	3,092	23.73%	29	0.22%	3,422	26.27%	13,029
Waynesboro	3,301	61.38%	1,446	26.89%	613	11.40%	18	0.33%	1,855	34.49%	5,378
Westmoreland	1,402	39.99%	1,156	32.97%	943	26.90%	5	0.14%	246	7.02%	3,506
Williamsburg	1,156	46.73%	991	40.06%	247	9.98%	80	3.23%	165	6.67%	2,474
Winchester	2,695	55.76%	1,360	28.14%	770	15.93%	8	0.17%	1,335	27.62%	4,833
Wise	5,004	39.70%	5,942	47.14%	1,635	12.97%	25	0.20%	-938	-7.44%	12,606
Wythe	3,638	52.25%	1,765	25.35%	1,377	19.78%	183	2.63%	1,873	26.90%	6,963
York	3,356	36.93%	2,370	26.08%	3,330	36.64%	32	0.35%	26	0.29%	9,088
Totals	590,319	43.36%	442,387	32.49%	321,833	23.64%	6,952	0.51%	147,932	10.87%	1,361,491

==== Counties and independent cities that flipped from Democratic to Republican ====
- Alleghany
- Amherst
- Arlington
- Bath
- Bland
- Botetourt
- Bristol
- Buena Vista
- Charlottesville
- Clarke
- Clifton Forge
- Covington
- Craig
- Culpeper
- Dickenson
- Fairfax
- Fairfax City
- Falls Church
- Fauquier
- Franklin
- Franklin City
- Fluvanna
- Fredericksburg
- Galax
- Giles
- Gloucester
- Grayson
- King George
- Lee
- Loudoun
- Louisa
- Patrick
- Prince William
- Pulaski
- Radford
- Rappahannock
- Roanoke City
- Rockbridge
- Rockingham
- Russell
- Scott
- Smyth
- Spotsylvania
- Stafford
- Suffolk
- Virginia Beach
- Warren
- Washington
- Waynesboro
- Westmoreland
- Williamsburg
- Winchester
- York

==== Counties and independent cities that flipped from Republican to Democratic ====
- Cumberland
- Essex
- Northampton
- Powhatan
- Sussex

==== Counties and independent cities that flipped from Democratic to American Independent ====
- Accomack
- Bedford
- Chesapeake
- Dinwiddie
- Franklin
- Henry
- Isle of Wight
- Southampton

==== Counties and independent cities that flipped from Republican to American Independent ====
- Brunswick
- Buckingham
- Charlotte
- Halifax
- Lunenburg
- Mecklenburg
- Nottoway
- Pittsylvania
- Prince George

== Works cited ==
- Black, Earl; Black, Merle (1992). The Vital South: How Presidents Are Elected. Harvard University Press. ISBN 0674941306.
