= Ansco Dokkum =

Dutch sailor (1904–1985)

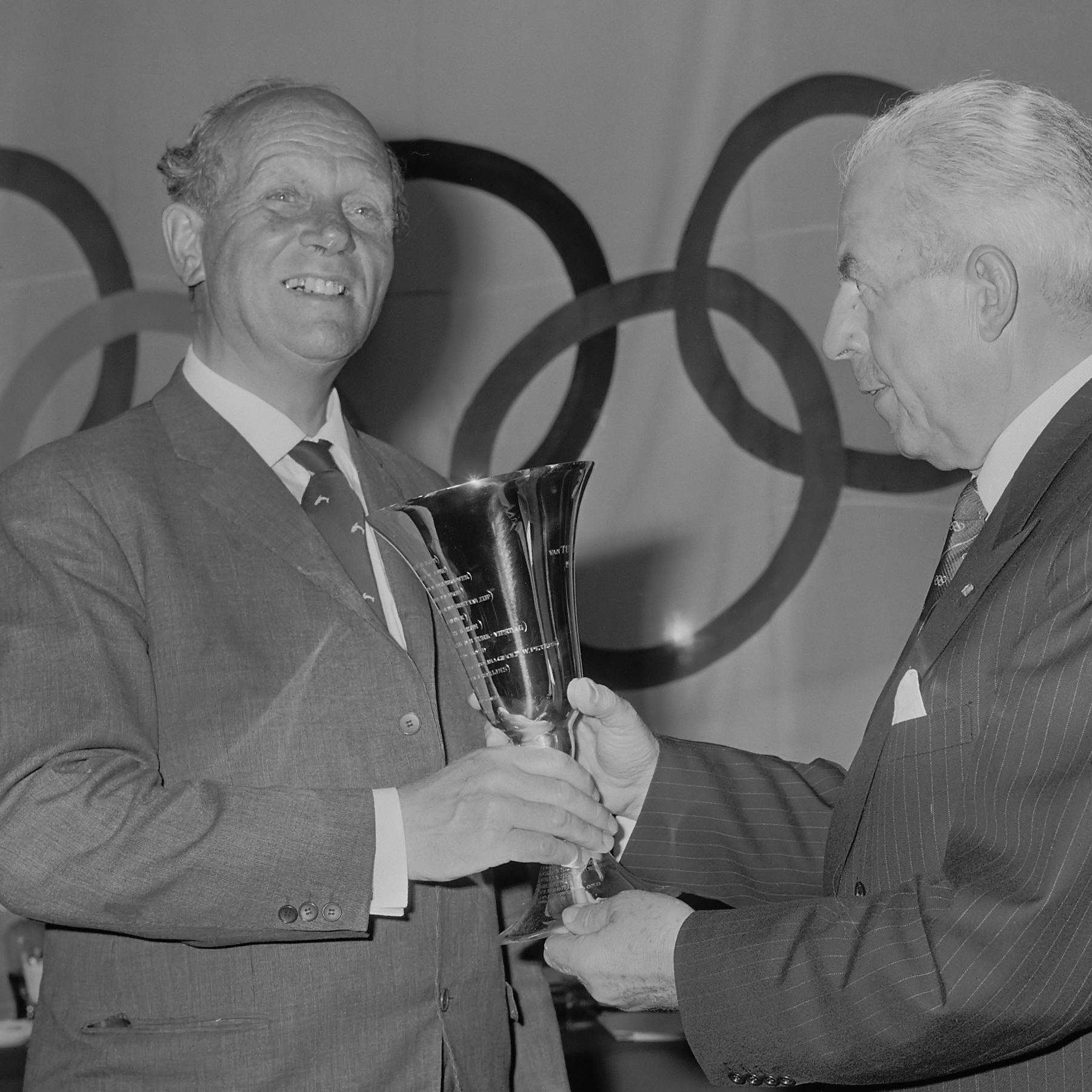
- Ansco Dokkum (l.) (1965)

Personal information
- Full name: Ansco Jan Heeble Dokkum
- Nationality: Dutch
- Born: 9 May 1904 Sneek
- Died: 30 December 1985 (aged 81) Amsterdam

Sport
- Sport: Rowing, Sailing
- Event(s): Coxless four, 6 Metre
- Club: Nereus Rowing Club
- Updated on 2014-01-04

Ansco Jan Heeble Dokkum (9 May 1904, Sneek – 30 December 1985, Amsterdam) was a sailor from the Netherlands, who represented his native country as at the 1936 Summer Olympics in Kiel. Dokkum, as crew member on the Dutch 6 Metre De Ruyter, took the 8th place with helmsman Joop Carp and fellow crew members: Ernst Moltzer, Kees Jonker and Herman Looman.

Before his sailing career, Ansco Dokkkum rowed for the Netherlands during the 1928 Summer Olympics in Amsterdam. In the Nereus Coxless four, he took 6th place with his teammates Simon Bon, Egbertus Waller and Paul Maasland.

Ansco Dokkum was chef d' mission of the Dutch team for 1968 Summer Olympics.
