= Paolo Gennari =

Italian rower (1908–1968)

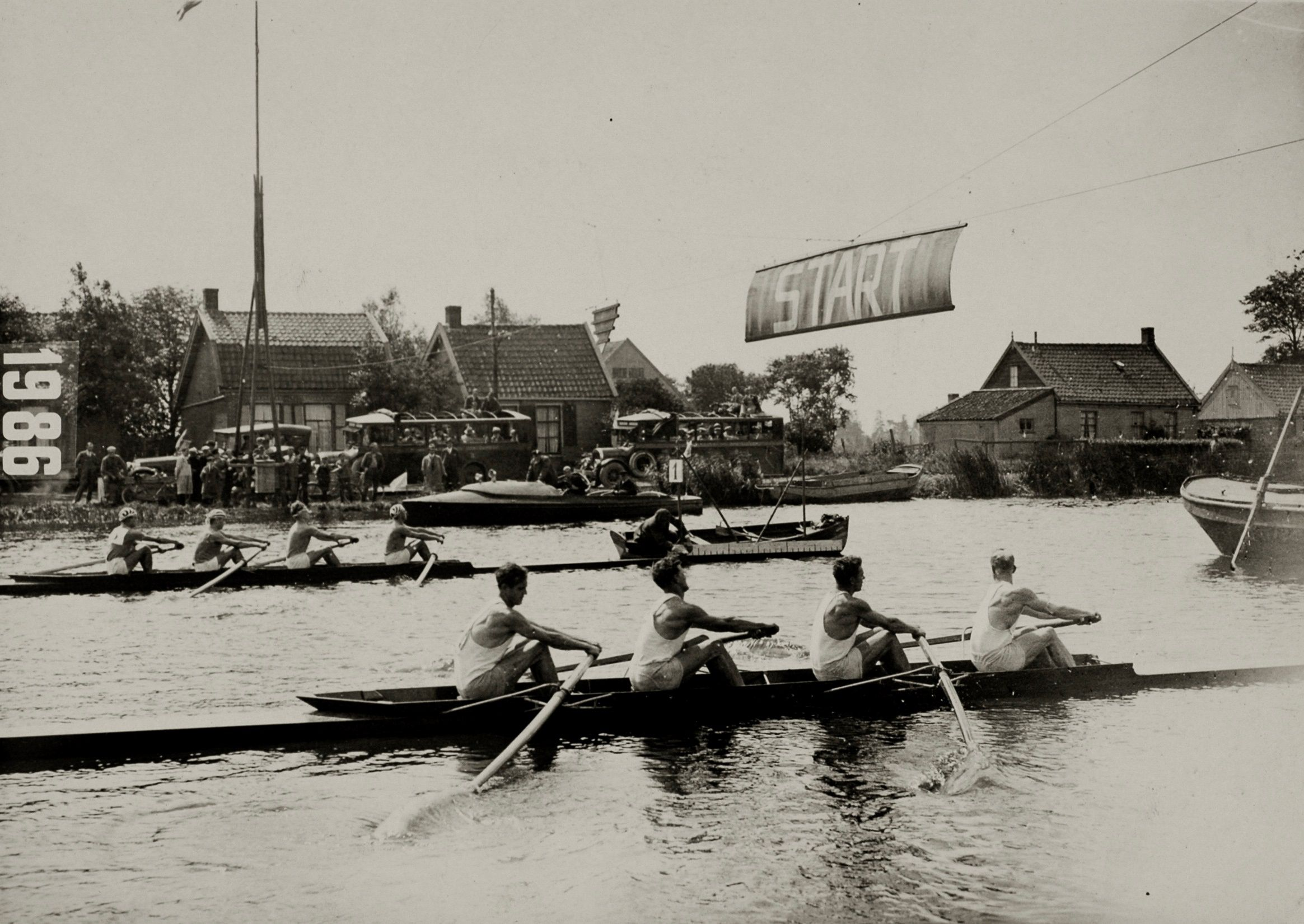

Personal information
- Born: 11 September 1908 Piacenza, Italy
- Died: 29 January 1968 (aged 59) Piacenza, Italy

Sport
- Sport: Rowing
Medal record
Men's rowing
Representing Italy
Olympic Games
Bronze medal – third place	1928 Amsterdam	Coxless four
European Rowing Championships
Gold medal – first place	1929 Bydgoszcz	Coxless four

Paolo Gennari (11 September 1908 – 29 January 1968) was an Italian rower who competed in the 1928 Summer Olympics. In 1928, he was part of the Italian boat, which won the bronze medal in the coxless four event.
