= Berend Carp =

Dutch Olympic sailor

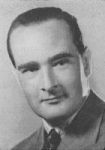

Personal information
- Full name: Bernard Carp
- Nationality: Dutch
- Born: 17 April 1901 Sragi, Lampung, Dutch East Indies
- Died: 22 July 1966 (aged 65) Hout Bay, South Africa

Sport

Sailing career
- Class: 6.5 Metre
Medal record
Sailing
Representing Netherlands
Olympic Games
Gold medal – first place	1920 Antwerp	6.5 Metre
- Updated on 2013-12-25

Bernard "Berend" Carp (17 April 1901, Sragi, Lampung, Dutch East Indies – 22 July 1966, Hout Bay, South Africa) was an Olympic sailor from the Netherlands, who represented his native country at the 1920 Summer Olympics in Ostend, Belgium. With helmsman and brother Joop Carp and fellow crew member Petrus Wernink, sailing the Dutch boat Oranje, Carp took the Gold in the 6.5 Metre.

== Professional life ==
In 1922, Carp started at the de n.v. Erven Lucas Bols in Amsterdam. He advanced his career up to director in 1936. In 1946, he moved to Cape Town to lead a distillery of Lucas Bols.

== Personal life ==
Carp financed several ornithological expeditions during the 1950s is Southern Africa (Namibia). He published the story of these expeditions in his book I Chose Africa.

== Publications by Berend Carp ==
- Tembo, de groote olifant: jachtavonturen in Kenya. V. H. C. de Boer, Jr. 1939. p. 298.
- A Study of the Influence of Certain Personal Factors on a Speech Judgment. Literary Licensing, LLC, 2012. April 2012. p. 130. ISBN 9781258308544.
- Your annual meeting, how to make the most of it: describing the purpose, plan, and program of health, welfare, and civic organization annual meetings, with tested methods of preparation and presentation. National Publicity Council for Health and Welfare Services. 1955. p. 168.
- I Chose Africa. H. Timmins. 1961. p. 127.
- Tribute to Isadore Freed. National Jewish Music Council. 1961. p. 4.
- Westwards from the Cape, March–September. B. Carp. 1962. p. 85.
- The Jewish Center Songster: More Than 100 Favorite Hebrew, Yiddish and English Songs for All Occasions. National Jewish Music Council. 1949. p. 96.
- Origins and First Years of the National Jewish Music Council. National Jewish Music Council. 1968. p. 26.

== Sources ==
- Evans, Hilary; Gjerde, Arild; Heijmans, Jeroen; Mallon, Bill; et al. "Berend Carp". Olympics at Sports-Reference.com. Sports Reference LLC. Archived from the original on 26 December 2013.
- "Antwerp Olympics". home.scarlet.be/~fhermans. Archived from the original on 27 December 2013.
- "Olympic Games 1920 – Officiel Report" (PDF). 1957. Archived from the original (PDF) on 27 September 2007.
- Hendriksma, Martin (2024). "Het Duitsland can Adolf Hitler liet jeneverstoker Bols weer bloeien" (hardcopy text). NRC (Dutch Daily newspaper) (in Dutch) (published 18 February 2024): E16–E18.
