= Herman Looman =

Dutch sailor (1907–1989)

Personal information
- Full name: Herman Carel Looman
- Nationality: Dutch
- Born: 8 November 1907 Amsterdam, Netherlands
- Died: December 1989 (aged 82) Lewisham, London, England

Sport

Sailing career
- Class: 6 Metre
- Updated on 2014-01-04

Herman Carel Looman (8 November 1907 – December 1989) was a sailor from the Netherlands, who represented his native country as at the 1936 Summer Olympics in Kiel. Looman, as crew member on the Dutch 6 Metre De Ruyter, took the 8th place with helmsman Joop Carp and fellow crew members: Ansco Dokkum, Ernst Moltzer and Kees Jonker.

== Sources ==
- "Herman Looman Bio, Stats, and Results". Olympic Sports. Sports-Reference.com. Archived from the original on 2013-12-03.
- "The XITH Olympic Games Berlin, 1936: Officiel Report, Volume I" (PDF). Berlin: the Organisationskomitee für die XI. Olympiade Berlin 1936 e. V. 1936. Archived from the original (PDF) on 2007-07-09.
- "The XITH Olympic Games Berlin, 1936: Officiel Report, Volume II" (PDF). Berlin: the Organisationskomitee für die XI. Olympiade Berlin 1936 e. V. 1936. Archived from the original (PDF) on 2007-07-09.
