= Robert Monier =

French sailor & France international rugby union player

Personal information
- Nationality: French
- Born: 20 February 1885 Bordeaux, France
- Died: 6 December 1944 (aged 59) Bordeaux, France

Sailing career
- Sport: Sailing
- Class: 6.5 Metre
Medal record
Sailing
Representing France
Olympic Games
Silver medal – second place	1920 Antwerp	6.5 Metre

Robert Monier (20 February 1885 – 6 December 1944) was a French sailor and national rugby union player. He was won the Silver medal along with Albert Weil and Félix Picon in Sailing at the 1920 Summer Olympics – 6.5 Metre race.
