= Günter Roll =

German rower

Personal information
- Nationality: German
- Born: 4 October 1905 Poznań, Poland
- Died: 10 July 1990 (aged 84)

Sport
- Sport: Rowing

Günter Roll (4 October 1905 – 10 July 1990) was a German rower. He competed in the men's coxless four event at the 1928 Summer Olympics.
