= Félix Picon =

French sailor

Personal information
- Full name: Philippe Félix Émile Picon
- Nationality: French
- Born: 4 October 1874 Constantine, Algeria
- Died: 4 December 1922 (aged 48) Bordeaux, France

Sport

Sailing career
- Class: 6.5 Metre
Medal record
Sailing
Representing France
Olympic Games
| Silver medal – second place | 1920 Antwerp | 6.5 Metre |

Philippe Félix Émile Picon (4 October 1874 – 4 December 1922) was a French sailor. He was won the Silver medal along with Robert Monier and Albert Weil in Sailing at the 1920 Summer Olympics – 6.5 Metre race.
