= Cesare Rossi (rower) =

Italian rower

Personal information
- Born: 10 November 1904
- Died: 7 November 1952 (aged 47)

Sport
- Sport: Rowing
Medal record
Men's rowing
Representing Italy
Olympic Games
Bronze medal – third place	1928 Amsterdam	Coxless four
European Rowing Championships
Gold medal – first place	1929 Bydgoszcz	Coxless four

Cesare Rossi (10 November 1904 – 7 November 1952) was an Italian rower who competed in the 1928 Summer Olympics. In 1928 he was part of the Italian boat, which won the bronze medal in the coxless four event.
