= Patrick Beesly =

British writer and intelligence officer (1913–1986)

- Born: 27 June 1913; Barnt Green, Worcestershire
- Died: 16 August 1986 (aged 73); Southampton, Hampshire
- Occupation: Author
- Writing career
- Genre: History

Patrick Beesly (27 June 1913 – 16 August 1986) was a British author and intelligence officer during World War II.

== Early life ==
Beesly was the fifth of six children of Gerald Beesly and his wife Helen (née Chamberlain) who was a cousin of Neville Chamberlain. Beesly attended Oundle School following which he read history at Trinity College, Cambridge. He thus came from a markedly establishment background, significant in the light of his later conclusions as a historian regarding the fate of the RMS Lusitania. Like his brother Richard Beesly, who obtained an Olympic gold medal in rowing, he had an interest in boats and became captain of the boat club. He received further education at Bonn, Vienna and Brussels.

== Career and military background ==
Just before World War II, he joined the Royal Navy Volunteer Reserve (RNVR) in June 1939, became a Sub-Lieutenant (Special Branch) and was appointed to the Naval Intelligence Division (NID 2), in the section concentrating on France, Spain and the Benelux countries. Subsequently, he became assistant to Lieutenant Commander (later Vice Admiral) Sir Norman Denning in the Operations Intelligence Centre (July 1940). His first assignment was with the activities of armed merchant raiders but from 1941 until the end of the war with Germany he worked on submarine tracking as deputy to Commander Rodger Winn. He was promoted to lieutenant commander and acted as intelligence officer to the Commander in Chief, Germany, at Flensburg and Minden.

=== Post-military activities ===
He left the navy in December 1945, receiving the American Legion of Merit (rank of Legionnaire) for his wartime services. He made a career in private industry with Henry Hope & Sons Ltd, becoming its managing director in 1967 before retiring in 1974.

== Intelligence and historical writings ==
Since, by that time, bans on writing about the intelligence services had been relaxed, he wrote about Intelligence operations. Patrick Beesly's first book, Very Special Intelligence in 1977 was well received. He proceeded to write other works on related intelligence and historical themes, some of which involved far-reaching conclusions.

== British 'plot...to endanger the Lusitania ' ==
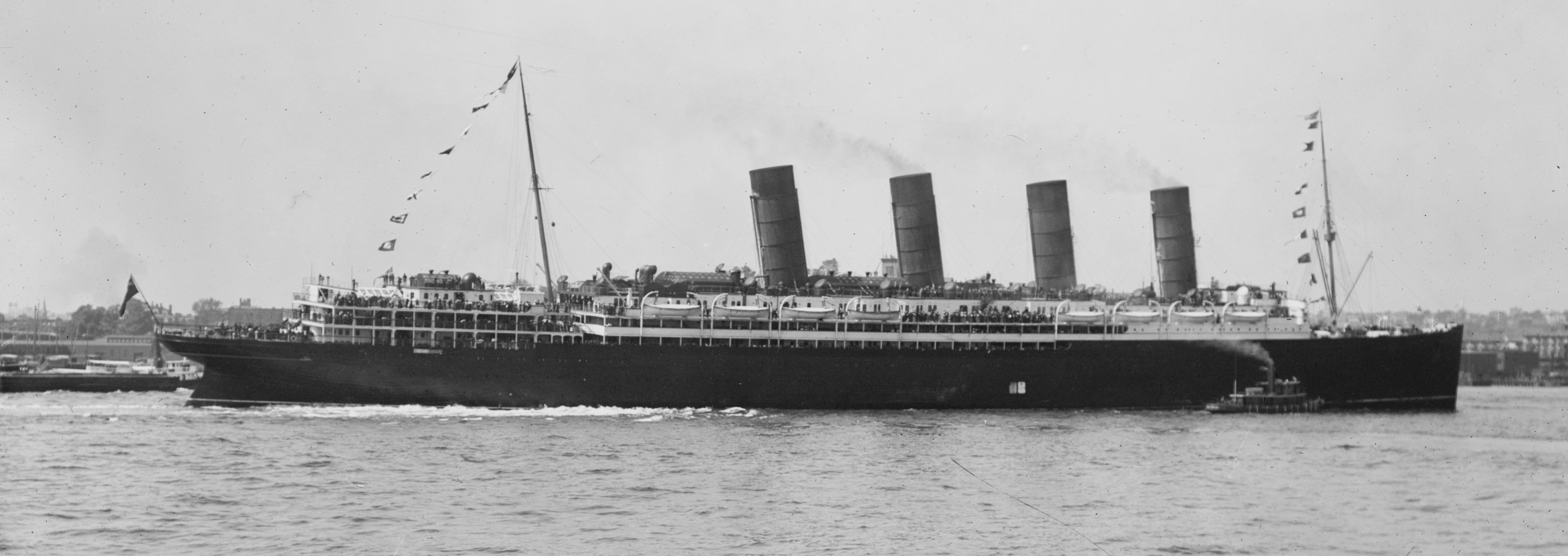
Lusitania arriving in New York on her maiden voyage

As a historian, Patrick Beesly is known for his espousal of the view that in World War One the British Admiralty deliberately endangered RMS Lusitania, sunk while sailing without escort in 1915, among whose passengers were many Americans, to bring the United States into the war. The Admiralty was headed by First Lord of the Admiralty Winston Churchill.

== Family ==
He married Pamela Mary Wildman in September 1939 and they had two daughters, Caroline and Judith.

== Bibliography ==
- Very Special Intelligence: The Story of the Admiralty's Operational Intelligence Centre 1939-1945. Hamish Hamilton (1977); with an introduction by W J R Gardiner.
- Very Special Admiral: The Life of Admiral J. H. Godfrey C.B.. Hamish Hamilton (1980); with a foreword by Stephen Roskill
- Room 40: British Naval Intelligence 1914-18. Hamish Hamilton (1982)
- Ultra and the Battle of the Atlantic. Hamish Hamilton (1983)
- Convoy PQ 17: A Study in Intelligence and Decision Making. Hamish Hamilton (1986)
