= Charles Karle =

American rower (1898–1946)

Olympic medal record

Men's rowing
Silver medal – second place	1928 Amsterdam	Coxless four

Charles George Karle (May 15, 1898 – June 24, 1946) was an American rower who competed in the 1928 Summer Olympics.

In 1928 he was a member of the American boat, which won the silver medal in the coxless fours event. Karle rowed stroke seat along with U.S. teammates Ernest Bayer, George Healis, and William Miller.
