= Umberto Bonadè =

Italian rower (1909–1992)

Personal information
- Born: 2 January 1909 Piacenza, Italy
- Died: 2 November 1992 (aged 83) Piacenza, Italy

Sport
- Sport: Rowing
Medal record
Men's rowing
Representing Italy
Olympic Games
Bronze medal – third place	1928 Amsterdam	Coxless four
European Rowing Championships
Gold medal – first place	1929 Bydgoszcz	Coxless four

Umberto Bonadè (2 January 1909 – 2 November 1992) was an Italian rower who competed in the 1928 Summer Olympics. In 1928 he was part of the Italian boat, which won the bronze medal in the coxless four event. He was born in Piacenza.
