= Kees Jonker =

Dutch sailor (1909–1987)

Personal information
- Full name: Cornelis Wilhelm Jonker
- Nickname: "Kees"
- Nationality: Dutch
- Born: 29 March 1909 Amsterdam, Netherlands
- Died: 28 February 1987 (aged 77) Steinach am Brenner, Austria

Sport

Sailing career
- Class(es): 6 Metre; Dragon
- Updated on 2014-01-04

Cornelis Wilhelm "Kees" Jonker (29 March 1909 – 28 February 1987) was a Dutch sailor who represented his country at the 1936 Summer Olympics in Kiel. Jonker, as crew member on the Dutch 6 Metre De Ruyter, took the 8th place with helmsman Joop Carp and fellow crew members Ansco Dokkum, Ernst Moltzer, and Herman Looman. During the 1948 Summer Olympics in Torbay, Jonker helmed the Dragon Joy, with crew members Biem Dudok van Heel and Wim van Duyl, to an 8th place.

== Sources ==
- "Kees Jonker Bio, Stats, and Results". Olympic Sports. Sports-Reference.com. Archived from the original on 2020-04-18.
- "The XITH Olympic Games Berlin, 1936: Officiel Report, Volume I" (PDF). Berlin: the Organisationskomitee für die XI. Olympiade Berlin 1936 e. V. 1936. Archived from the original (PDF) on 2007-07-09.
- "The XITH Olympic Games Berlin, 1936: Officiel Report, Volume II" (PDF). Berlin: the Organisationskomitee für die XI. Olympiade Berlin 1936 e. V. 1936. Archived from the original (PDF) on 2007-07-09.
- "DE KEUZEWEDSTRIJDEN VOOR DE OLYMPISCHE SPELEN" (Evening ed.). Nieuwsblad van Friesland : Hepkema's courant. 1946-06-25.
- "Bronzen medailles voor Bob Maas en Koos de Jong" (in Dutch) (Dag ed.). Het vrĳe volk : democratisch-socialistisch dagblad. 1948-08-13.
- "The Official Report of the Organising Committee for the XIV Olympiad London 1948" (PDF). 1951. Archived from the original (PDF) on 2011-07-16.
