= Piet Wernink =

Dutch sailor (1895–1971)

Petrus Wernink
Personal information
- Full name: Petrus Adrianus Wernink
- Nationality: Dutch
- Born: 1 April 1895 Oudshoorn
- Died: 29 November 1971 (aged 76) Wassenaar

Sailing career
- Sport: Sailing
- Class: 6.5 Metre
Medal record
Sailing
Representing Netherlands
Olympic Games
Gold medal – first place	1920 Antwerp	6.5 Metre
- Updated on 2013-12-27

Petrus "Piet" Adrianus Wernink (1 April 1895 in Oudshoorn – 29 November 1971, Wassenaar) was a sailor from the Netherlands, who represented his native country at the 1920 Summer Olympics in Ostend, Belgium. With helmsman Joop Carp and fellow crew member Berend Carp, sailing the Dutch boat Oranje, Wernink took the Gold in the 6.5 Metre.

== Sources ==
- "Petrus Wernink Bio, Stats, and Results". Olympic Sports. Sports-Reference.com. Archived from the original on 2020-04-18.
- "Antwerp Olympics". home.scarlet.be/~fhermans. Archived from the original on 2013-12-27.
- "Olympic Games 1920 – Officiel Report" (PDF). 1957. Archived from the original (PDF) on 2007-09-27.
