= Joop Carp =

Dutch sailor (1897–1962)

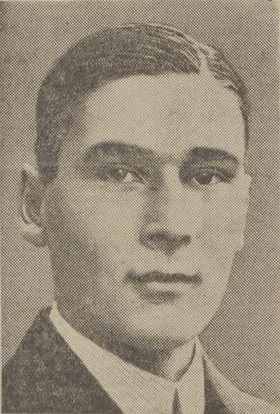
- Carp in 1920

Personal information
- Full name: Johan Robert Carp
- Nationality: Dutch
- Born: 30 January 1897 Tjomal, Dutch East Indies
- Died: 25 March 1962 (aged 65) Johannesburg, Gauteng, South Africa

Sport

Sailing career
- Class(es): 6.5 Metre; 6 Metre
Medal record
sailing
Representing Netherlands
Olympic Games
Gold medal – first place	1920 Antwerp	6.5 Metre
Bronze medal – third place	1924 Paris	6 Metre
- Updated on 2013-12-25

Johan Robert "Joop" Carp (30 January 1897 in Tjomal, Dutch East Indies – 25 March 1962 in Johannesburg) was a sailor from the Netherlands, who represented his native country at the 1920 Summer Olympics in Ostend, Belgium. With crew Bernard Carp and Petrus Wernink, helming Dutch boat Oranje, Carp took the Gold in the 6.5 Metre. In the 1924 Olympics Carp took part of the competition in the 6 Metre with the Dutch boat Willem Six with crew members Anthonij Guépin and Jan Vreede Carp took this time the bronze medal. In the 1936 Olympics Carp returned to the Olympics as helmsman of the Dutch 6 Metre De Ruyter this time with crew members Ansco Dokkum, Kees Jonker, Herman Looman, Ernst Moltzer and finished eighth overall.

== Professional life ==
Joop Carp studied law at the Leiden University. He graduated in 1921. Shortly after that he became vice-president of Fokker Aircraft. Here he was involved in the development of the first large commercial aircraft.

Later Carp became more involved with the exploitation of important inventions like the 'Oertz-rudder', de 'Frigoplate' en de 'Frost-O-Matic Ice Cream Vending Machine'. In 1926 he opened his own office in New York City. Later he emigrated to South Africa.

== Personal life ==
Carp married, and divorced, Johanna Sybille Hall who was also an Olympic athlete in Dressage during the Olympic Games of 1960, 1964 and 1968.

== Sources ==
- Evans, Hilary; Gjerde, Arild; Heijmans, Jeroen; Mallon, Bill; et al. "Joop Carp". Olympics at Sports-Reference.com. Sports Reference LLC. Archived from the original on 18 April 2020.
- "Antwerp Olympics". home.scarlet.be/~fhermans. Archived from the original on 27 December 2013.
- "Olympic Games 1920 – Officiel Report" (PDF). 1957. Archived from the original (PDF) on 27 September 2007.
- Hendriksma, Martin (2024). "Het Duitsland can Adolf Hitler liet jeneverstoker Bols weer bloeien" (hardcopy text). NRC (Dutch Daily newspaper) (in Dutch) (published 18 February 2024): E16–E18.
- "Les Jeux de la VIIIe Olympiade Paris 1924:rapport official" (PDF) (in French). Paris: Librairie de France: Comité Olympique Français. 1924. Archived from the original (PDF) on 21 April 2013.
- "The XITH Olympic Games Berlin, 1936: Officiel Report, Volume I" (PDF). Berlin: the Organisationskomitee für die XI. Olympiade Berlin 1936 e. V. 1936. Archived from the original (PDF) on 9 July 2007.
- "The XITH Olympic Games Berlin, 1936: Officiel Report, Volume II" (PDF). Berlin: the Organisationskomitee für die XI. Olympiade Berlin 1936 e. V. 1936. Archived from the original (PDF) on 9 July 2007.
