= George Healis =

American rower (1906–1990)

Olympic medal record

Men's rowing
Silver medal – second place	1928 Amsterdam	Coxless four

George Albert Healis (June 3, 1906 – December 6, 1990) was an American rower who competed in the 1928 Summer Olympics.

In 1928 he was part of the American boat, which won the silver medal in the coxless fours event.
