= Werner Zschiesche =

German rower

Personal information
- Nationality: German
- Born: 6 April 1903; Dresden, Germany
- Died: 5 August 1974 (aged 71); Nordrhein-Westfalen, Germany

Sport
- Sport: Rowing

Werner Zschiesche (6 April 1903 – 5 August 1974) was a German rower. He competed in the men's coxless four event at the 1928 Summer Olympics.
