= Albert Weil =

French sailor

Personal information
- Full name: Albert Paul Moïse Weil
- Born: 26 December 1880 Paris, France
- Died: 5 December 1945 (aged 64) Paris, France

Sport

Sailing career
- Class: 6.5 Metre
Medal record
sailing
Representing France
Olympic Games
Silver medal – second place	1920 Antwerp	6.5 Metre

Albert Paul Moïse Weil (26 December 1880 – 5 December 1945) was a French sailor. He was won the Silver medal helming his boat Rose Pompon along with its crew Robert Monier and Félix Picon in Sailing at the 1920 Summer Olympics – 6.5 Metre race.
