= Ernst Moltzer =

Dutch sailor (1910–1941)

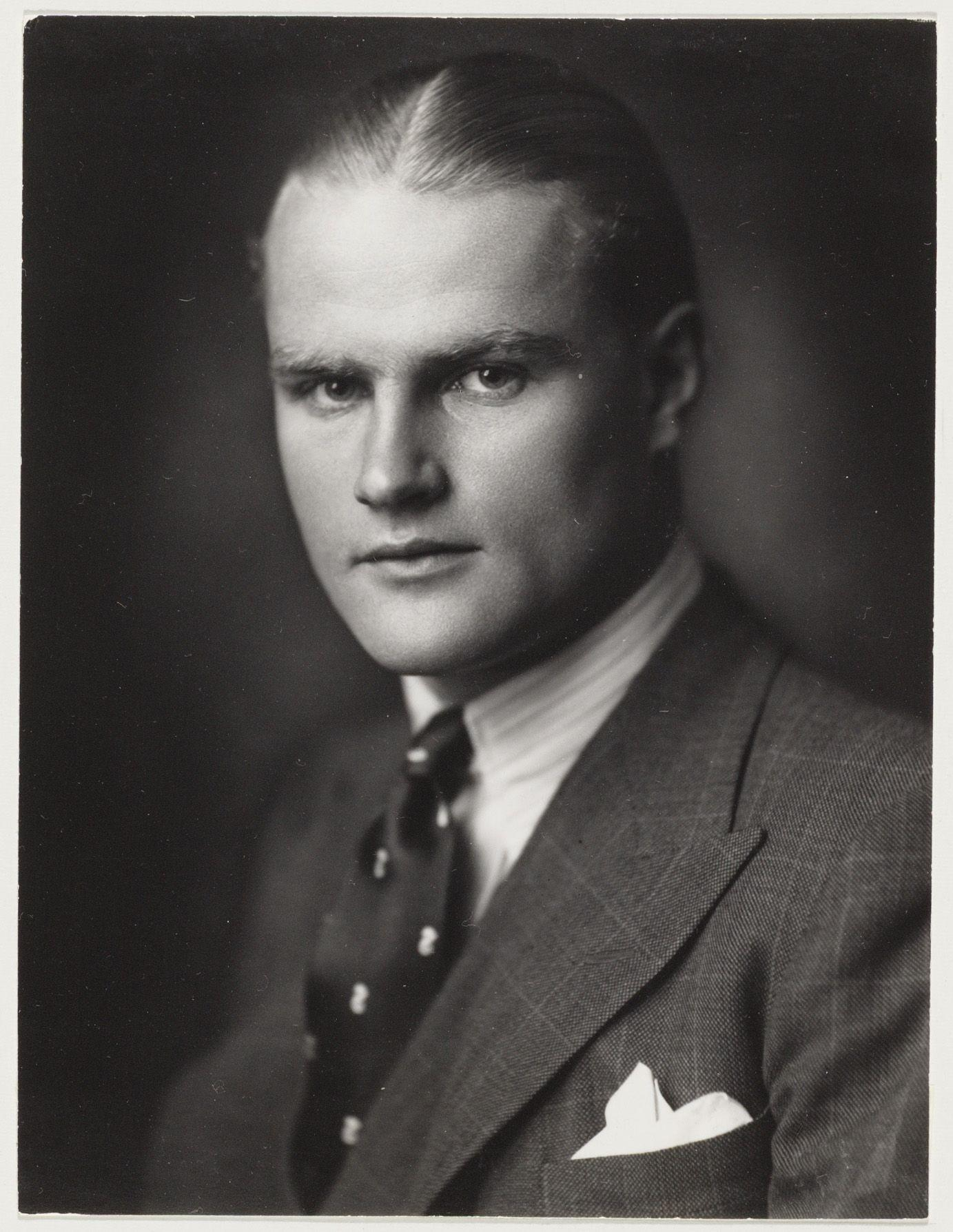
- Moltzer (1934)

Personal information
- Full name: Ernst Octavianus Moltzer
- Nationality: Dutch
- Born: 1 May 1910 Amsterdam, Netherlands
- Died: 15 November 1941 (aged 31) North Sea

Sport

Sailing career
- Class: 6 Metre
- Updated on 2014-01-04

Ernst Octavianus Moltzer (1 May 1910 – 15 November 1941) was a sailor from the Netherlands who represented his native country as at the 1936 Summer Olympics in Kiel. Ernst, as crew member on the Dutch 6 Metre De Ruyter, took the 8th place with helmsman Joop Carp and fellow crew members: Ansco Dokkum, Kees Jonker and Herman Looman.

== Personal life ==
Ernst Moltzer married in 1939 with countess Gertrude Anna Luise Therese Thusnelde von Sarnthein from Austria. During World War 2, he, along with his nephew and his uncle, was on the board of directors of Lucas Bols, a family-run company making and selling liquor, but was forced out after complaining that they were making too much money doing business with the German occupier. He became an Engelandvaarder, but died on the North Sea while trying to escape to England. His death certificate, dated 12 January 1951, states the date of death as 15 November 1941. A jawbone, fished out of the North Sea in 2003, was confirmed in 2024 to be Moltzer's.

== Sources ==
- "Ernst Moltzer Bio, Stats, and Results". Olympic Sports. Sports-Reference.com. Archived from the original on 4 December 2013.
- Hendriksma, Martin (2024). "Het Duitsland can Adolf Hitler liet jeneverstoker Bols weer bloeien" (hardcopy text). NRC (Dutch Daily newspaper) (in Dutch). NRC (published 18 February 2024): E16–E18.
- "The XITH Olympic Games Berlin, 1936: Officiel Report, Volume I" (PDF). Berlin: the Organisationskomitee für die XI. Olympiade Berlin 1936 e. V. 1936. Archived from the original (PDF) on 9 July 2007.
- "The XITH Olympic Games Berlin, 1936: Officiel Report, Volume II" (PDF). Berlin: the Organisationskomitee für die XI. Olympiade Berlin 1936 e. V. 1936. Archived from the original (PDF) on 9 July 2007.
- "Biografie Ernst Octavianus Moltzer" (in Dutch). De geschiedenis van het Humanitarisme in Nederland.
