= Ernest Bayer =

American rower (1904–1997)

Olympic medal record

Men's rowing
Silver medal – second place	1928 Amsterdam	Coxless four

Ernest Henry Bayer (September 27, 1904 – January 13, 1997) was an American rower who competed in the 1928 Summer Olympics.

In 1928 he was part of the American boat, which won the silver medal in the coxless fours event.
