= Heinrich Zänker =

German rower

Personal information
- Nationality: German
- Born: 22 September 1902; Dresden, Germany
- Died: 1 June 1984 (aged 81); Freital, Germany

Sport
- Sport: Rowing

Heinrich Zänker (22 September 1902 – 1 June 1984) was a German rower. He competed in the men's coxless four event at the 1928 Summer Olympics.
