= 1930 Alabama gubernatorial election =

- November 4, 1930
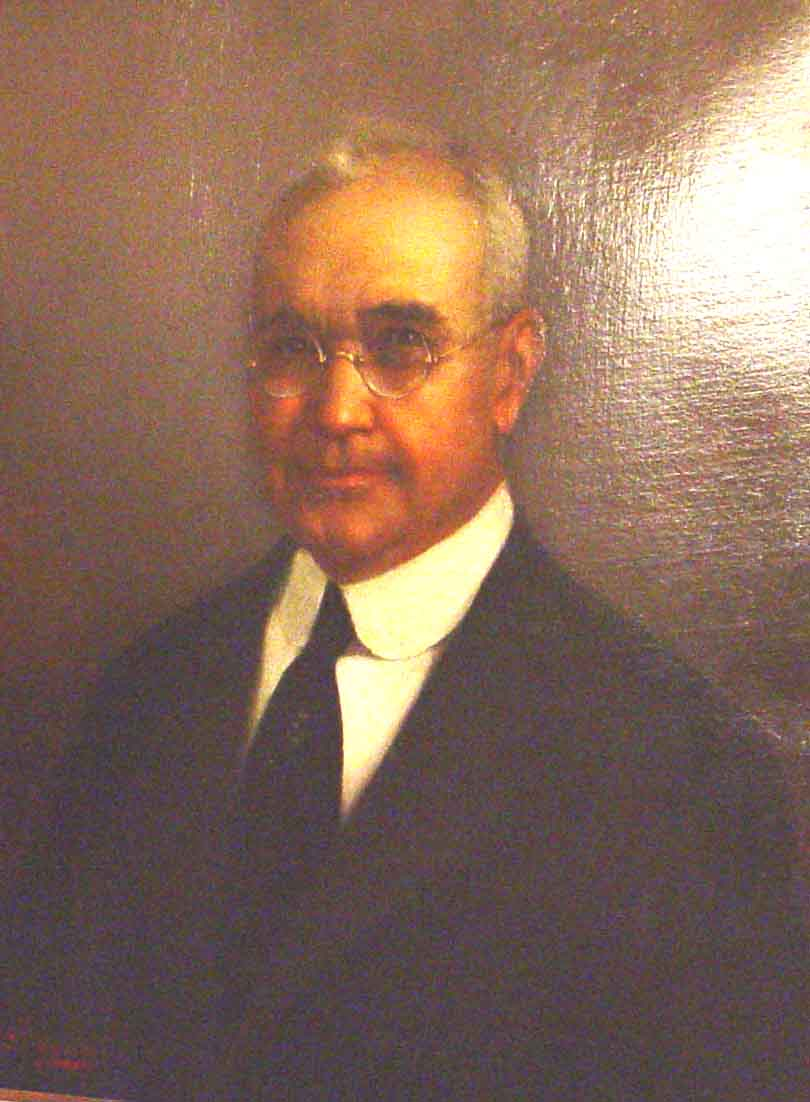

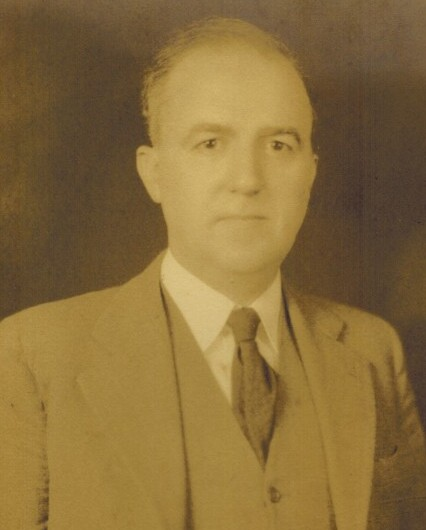
Nominee	Benjamin M. Miller	Hugh A. Locke
Party	Democratic	Independent
Popular vote	155,034	95,745
Percentage	61.82%	38.18%
- County results Miller: 50–60% 60–70% 70–80% 80–90% >90% Locke: 50–60% 60–70%
Governor before election
Bibb Graves
Democratic
Elected Governor
Benjamin M. Miller
Democratic

The 1930 Alabama gubernatorial election took place on November 4, 1930, in order to elect the governor of Alabama. Democratic incumbent Bibb Graves was term-limited and could not seek a second consecutive term.

== Democratic primary ==
At the time this election took place, Alabama, as with most other southern states, was solidly Democratic, and the Republican Party had such diminished influence that the Democratic primary was the de facto contest for state offices; a candidate who won the Democratic primary was all but assured of winning the general election. At this point, the Alabama Democratic Party used the supplementary vote in its primary elections.

=== Results ===
1930 Alabama Democratic gubernatorial primary
Party	Candidate	1st round		2nd round			1st round votesTransfer votes, 2nd round
Party	Candidate	Total	Of round	Transfers	Total	Of round	1st round votesTransfer votes, 2nd round
Democratic	Benjamin M. Miller	77,066	39.18%	9,994	87,060	51.61%	
Democratic	W. C. Davis	70,966	36.06%	10,673	81,639	48.39%	
Democratic	Woolsey Finnell	19,320	9.82%				
Democratic	Charlie C. McCall	19,004	9.66%				
Democratic	J. A. Carnley	7,834	3.98%				
Democratic	Watt T. Brown	2,518	1.28%				

== Results ==
1930 Alabama gubernatorial election
Party	Candidate	Votes	%
Democratic	Benjamin M. Miller	155,034	61.82
Independent	Hugh A. Locke	95,745	38.18
Total votes		250,779	100.00
Democratic hold			
