= 6.5 Metre =

Development
- Design: Development class

Boat
- Crew: 3
- Draft: 1 m (3 ft 3 in)

Hull
- Hull weight: minimum 600 kg (1,300 lb)
- LOA: 6.5 m (21 ft)
- LWL: minimum 5.2 m (17 ft)

Sails
- Upwind sail area: maximum 30 m^{2} (320 sq ft)

The International 6.5 Metre Class is a sailing construction class. The boats are not identical but designed to meet specific measurement formula, in this case the French rule called Jauge chemin de fer.

== History ==
The 6.5m was used as an Olympic Class during the 1920 Olympics.

The first formula of the 6.5m, was worked out by Louis Dyèvre, member of the Société des régates de Vannes, naval architect and member of the French delegation to the congress of London of 1906, is inspired by the formula of the New York Yacht Club in 1903:

$$\frac {Lf \cdot \sqrt{S}} {\sqrt[3]{D}} \le 2.8$$

Lf represents the waterline length (LWL), S the measured sail area, D displacement.

The principal restrictions are:

- Maximum length: 6.50 m
- Minimum displacement: 600 kg
- Draft: 1 m
- Measured sail area : 30 m^{2}
- Maximum cockpit area: 2 m^{2}
- The LWL taken into account in the formula is at least of the 4/5 the length.

== Olympic results ==
=== 1920 ===
Games	Gold	Silver	Bronze
1920 Antwerp	Netherlands (NED); Joop Carp; Berend Carp; Petrus Wernink	France (FRA); Albert Weil; Robert Monier; Félix Picon	No further competitors
