= Richard Beesly =

British rower (1907–1965)

Olympic medal record

Men's rowing

Representing Great Britain
| Gold medal – first place | 1928 Amsterdam | Coxless four |

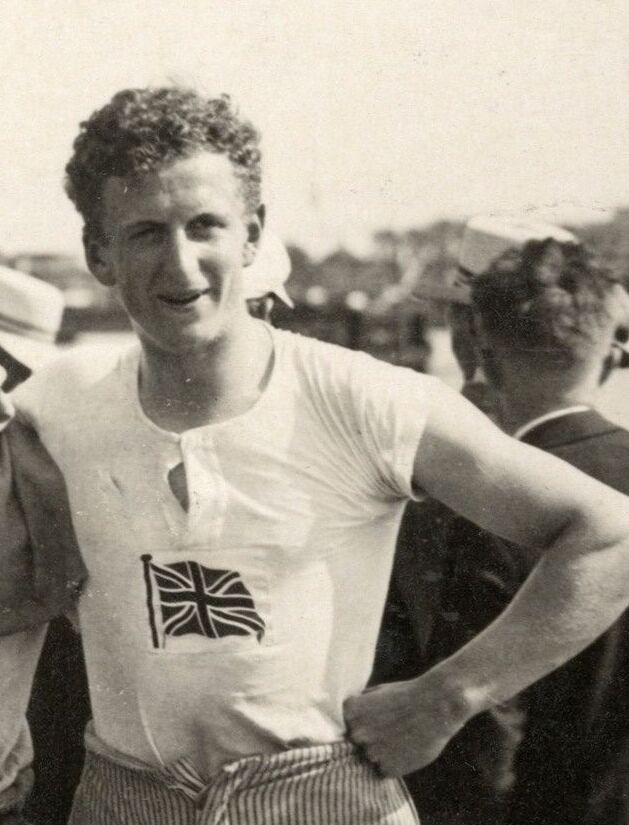
Richard Beesly (1928)

Richard Beesly (27 July 1907 – 28 March 1965) was a British rower who won an Olympic gold medal at the 1928 Summer Olympics.

Beesly was born at Bromsgrove, the son of Gerald Beesly and his wife Helen (née Chamberlain) who was a cousin of Neville Chamberlain. He was educated at Oundle School and Trinity College, Cambridge, where he was a member of the First Trinity Boat Club. He rowed at a number four for the winning Cambridge crew in the Boat Race in 1927 and 1928. Also in 1928, First Trinity represented Great Britain rowing at the 1928 Summer Olympics in Amsterdam, where, at the age of 21, he won an Olympic gold medal in the coxless four with John Lander, Michael Warriner and Edward Bevan. They recorded a time of 6:36.0 in the final to beat the US crew by 1 second. He was President of C.U.B.C. in 1929 when Cambridge won the Boat Race again.

In 1932, Beesly joined Guest Keen and Nettlefolds, a firm with which he had strong family connections on his mother's side. During World War II he served with the Ministry of Supply. In 1945 he bought a controlling interest in a light engineering firm which produced mechanical hedge cutters and mobile forestry saws. He lived at Ashford Hall, Shropshire where he had a farm. He met his death there when he was attacked and killed instantly by a bull.

One of his brothers, Patrick Beesly was an author and intelligence officer.

== See also ==
- List of Cambridge University Boat Race crews
