= Egbertus Waller =

Dutch rower

Egbertus Jacobus Waller
Personal information
- Born: Egbertus Jacobus Waller; 10 December 1901 Vrijenban, the Netherlands
- Died: 23 October 1982 (aged 80) Wassenaar, the Netherlands

Sport
- Sport: Rowing
- Club: Nereus, Amsterdam
Medal record
Men's rowing
Representing Netherlands
European Rowing Championships
| Silver medal – second place | 1926 Lucerne | Coxless four |

Egbertus Jacobus Waller (10 December 1901 – 23 October 1982 ) was a Dutch rower. He competed at the 1924 and 1928 Summer Olympics in the men's eight and coxless four, respectively, but failed to reach the finals.
