= Michael Warriner =

British rower

Olympic medal record

Men's rowing

Representing Great Britain
Gold medal – first place	1928 Amsterdam	Coxless four

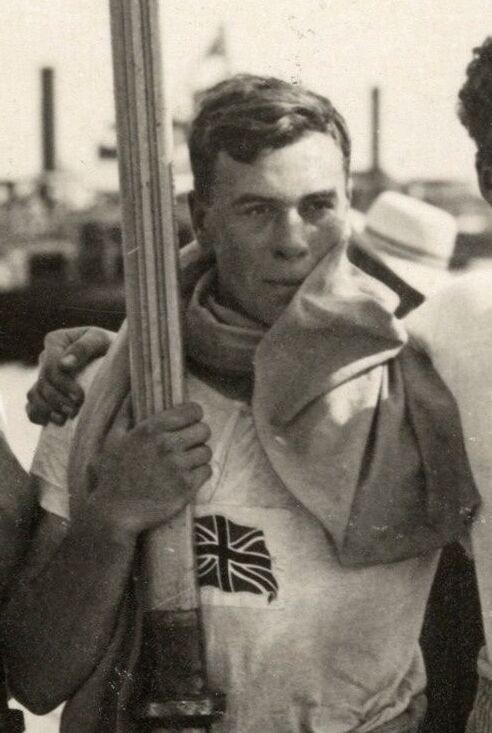
Michael Warriner (1928)

Michael Henry Warriner (3 December 1908 – 7 April 1986) was an English rower who competed in the 1928 Summer Olympics representing Great Britain.

Warriner was born at Chipping Norton, Oxfordshire. He was educated at Harrow School and Trinity College, Cambridge, where he rowed with the First Trinity Boat Club and was a member of the Pitt Club. First Trinity represented Great Britain rowing at the 1928 Summer Olympics in Amsterdam, where Warriner won an Olympic gold medal in the coxless four with John Lander, Edward Vaughan Bevan, and Richard Beesly. They recorded a time of 6:36.0 in the final to beat the U.S. crew by 1 second. He was also in the winning Cambridge boat in Boat Races of 1928, 1929 and 1930. He was president of the C.U.B.C. in his last year. He was in winning crews at Henley Royal Regatta in the Visitors' Challenge Cup in 1928, and the Stewards' Challenge Cup and the Ladies' Challenge Plate in 1929.

In 1930, Warriner went into colonial service with the Sudan Government. He returned to England in 1934 and went into business as an engineer. During World War II, he was initially with the Indian Army but then served as a lieutenant colonel in the Royal Engineers in Greece and the Middle East. He was awarded an MBE in 1945. He was Deputy Lieutenant of Warwickshire and an alderman of Warwickshire County Council. In 1972, he became chairman of the council.

Warriner was the brother of the humanitarian Doreen Warriner. He died at Shipston-on-Stour, Warwickshire at the age of 77.

== See also ==
- List of Cambridge University Boat Race crews
