= Edward Vaughan Bevan =

British doctor and rower (1907–1988)

Olympic medal record

Men's rowing
Gold medal – first place	1928 Amsterdam	Coxless four

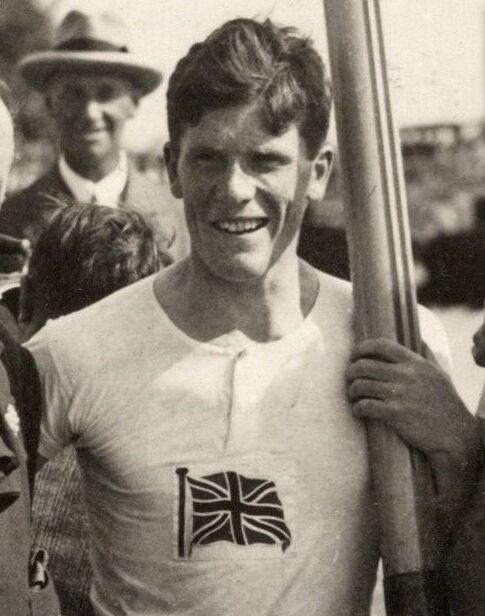
Edward Vaughan Bevan (1928)

Edward Vaughan Bevan (3 November 1907 – 23 February 1988) was a British doctor and rower who won a gold medal at the 1928 Summer Olympics in Amsterdam.

== Biography and career ==
Bevan was born at Chesterton, Cambridgeshire. He was educated at Bedford School where he was in the rugby XV and Trinity College, Cambridge, where he rowed with the First Trinity Boat Club. First Trinity represented Great Britain rowing at the 1928 Summer Olympics in Amsterdam, where, at the age of 20, Bevan won an Olympic gold medal in the coxless four with John Lander, Michael Warriner and Richard Beesly. They recorded a time of 6:36.0 in the final to beat the U.S. crew by 1 second.

After university, Bevan was a doctor in Cambridge, and shared his practice with Rex Wood, who competed in the shot put at the 1924 and 1928 Olympics. He maintained his link with rowing – on the wall of his consulting room was a blue oar. He was also senior treasurer of the Cambridge University Boat Club for many years, and was actively involved in coaching the crew, as well as being President of Rob Roy Boat Club from 1946 until 1980. He was a frequent correspondent to the British Medical Journal.

Bevan was doctor to the philosopher Ludwig Wittgenstein whilst he was in Cambridge. After Bevan diagnosed Wittgenstein with prostate cancer, Wittgenstein moved in with Bevan in Storey's Way, Cambridge in February 1951, where he stayed until his death on 29 April 1951. In Cambridge Bevan shared a medical practice with Rex Woods, the Olympic shot putter.

Bevan died at the age of 80. His elder brother Llewelyn Bevan rowed for Cambridge in the Boat Race, but Edward himself did not.
