= John Lander (rower) =

British rower

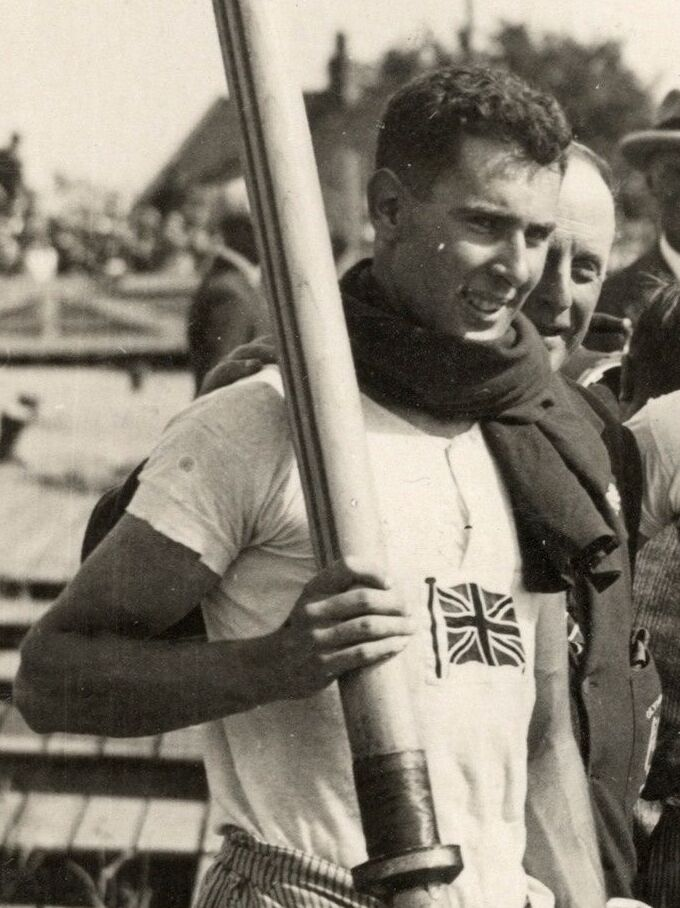

Personal information
- Born: John Gerard Heath Lander; 7 September 1907 Liverpool, England
- Died: 25 December 1941 (aged 34) Stanley, Hong Kong

Sport
- Sport: Rowing
- Club: First Trinity Boat Club
Medal record
Men's rowing
Representing Great Britain
Gold medal – first place	1928 Amsterdam	Coxless four

John Gerard Heath Lander (7 September 1907 – 25 December 1941) was a British rower who competed at the 1928 Summer Olympics. He was killed in action during the Second World War.

Lander was born in Liverpool. He attended Shrewsbury School and was in the Shrewsbury crew that won the Ladies' Challenge Plate at Henley Royal Regatta in 1924. He then went to Trinity College, Cambridge, where he crewed for the First Trinity Boat Club. With Edward Vaughan Bevan, Richard Beesly and Michael Warriner, he won an Olympic gold medal in the coxless fours event rowing at the 1928 Summer Olympics in Amsterdam. They recorded a time of 6:36.0 in the final to beat the U.S. crew by 1 second. In 1929 Lander was expected to be included in the Cambridge crew in the Boat Race, but Richard Beesly, fellow gold medalist and the Cambridge President, called on Tom Brocklebank as stroke instead.

== Personal life ==
Upon leaving Cambridge, Lander took up a business appointment in Hong Kong. After the Japanese invasion of Hong Kong, Lander enlisted as a gunner in the Hong Kong Volunteer Defence Corps. He was killed in action near St. Stephen's College on 25 December 1941. Lander is buried at Sai Wan War Cemetery.
