= Paul Maasland =

Dutch rower

Personal information
- Born: 17 December 1903 The Hague, Netherlands
- Died: 15 September 1983 (aged 79) Auckland, New Zealand

Sport
- Sport: Rowing
- Club: Nereus, Amsterdam
Medal record
Men's rowing
Representing the Netherlands
European Rowing Championships
| Gold medal – first place | 1924 Zürich | Eight |

Paul Maasland (17 December 1903 – 15 September 1983) was a Dutch rower. He competed at the 1924 and 1928 Summer Olympics in the men's eight and coxless four, respectively, but failed to reach the finals.
