= Friedrich Wilhelm von Goedecke =

Major General Friedrich Wilhelm von Goedecke (1771 – 1857) was a German (Nassau) soldier and politician in Dutch-Luxembourg service. (Note: Also spelt in some sources as Friedrich Wilhelm von Gödecke)

== Biography ==
Goedecke was born in 1771 in Diez, County of Nassau.

At the start of the Waterloo Campaign the then Colonel Goedecke was in command of both the Nassau 2nd Regiment and the Netherlands 2nd Brigade, but on 15 June, the day hostilities commenced, he broke his leg. Major Settler (the senior major and commander of the 1st Battalion) took commanded of the 2nd Regiment, and Prince Bernhard of Saxe-Weimar took command of the 2nd Brigade.

Goedecke attained the rank of Major General and acted in Luxembourg state service. Luxembourg was at that time in personal union affiliated with the Netherlands. Goedecke was appointed as supreme commander of the armed forces Luxembourg, and was in 1831 included in the Government Council of the Governor of Luxembourg, Prince Bernhard (in Dutch service).

Goedecke was from May 27, 1831 until June 18, 1839 President of the Government Council in Luxembourg. He died in 1857.
