= Wolfgang Goedecke =

German rower

Personal information
- Nationality: German
- Born: 23 July 1906; Dresden, Germany
- Died: 15 August 1942 (aged 36); Dubna, Russia

Sport
- Sport: Rowing

Wolfgang Goedecke (23 July 1906 – 15 August 1942) was a German rower. He competed in the men's coxless four event at the 1928 Summer Olympics. He was killed in action during World War II.
