= Henri Bonzano =

French rower

Personal information
- Nationality: French
- Born: 30 October 1903
- Died: 23 November 1995 (aged 92)

Sport
- Sport: Rowing

Henri Bonzano (30 October 1903 – 23 November 1995) was a French rower. He competed at the 1924 Summer Olympics (Men's Coxless Fours, 4 place) and the 1928 Summer Olympics (DNS h2 r3/5). Brother of Albert Bonzano. Club Société Nautique de la Marne.
