= Albert Bonzano =

French rower

Personal information
- Nationality: French
- Born: 2 March 1905; Paris, France
- Died: 13 August 1985 (aged 80); Clichy, France

Sport
- Sport: Rowing

Albert Bonzano (2 March 1905 – 13 August 1985) was a French rower. He competed at the 1924 Summer Olympics (Men's Coxless Fours, 4 place) and the 1928 Summer Olympics. Brother of Henri Bonzano.
