= Henri Préaux =

French rower

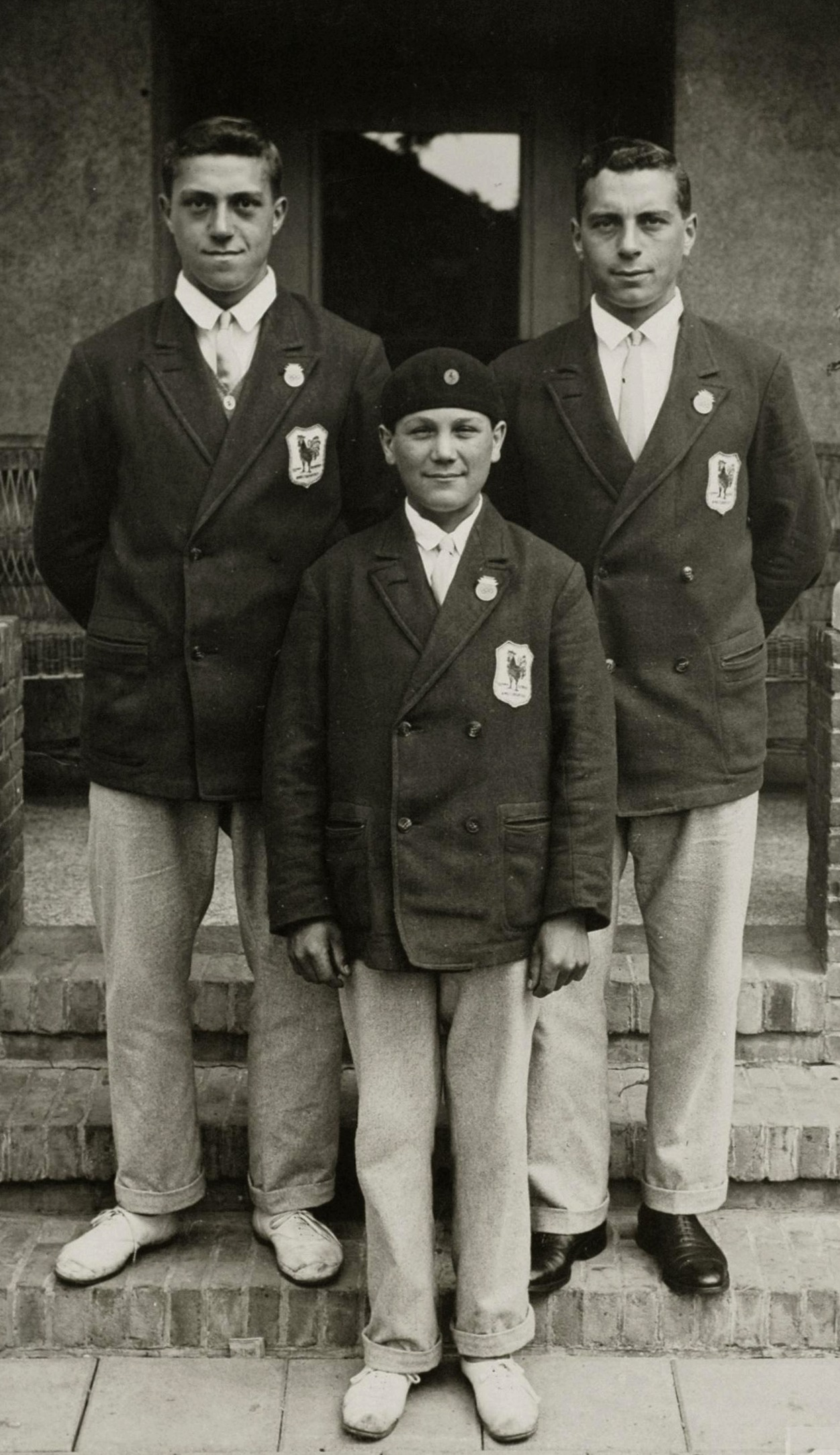
- Henri Préaux (middle) at the 1928 Olympics

Personal information
- Born: 25 November 1911 Loivre, France
- Died: 21 February 1992 (aged 80) Châlons-en-Champagne, Marne, France

Sport
- Sport: Rowing
- Club: Régates rémoises, Reims
Medal record
Representing France
Olympic Games
Silver medal – second place	1928 Amsterdam	Coxed pair

Henri Camille Préaux (25 November 1911 – 21 February 1992) was a French rowing coxswain who won a silver medal in the coxed pairs at the 1928 Summer Olympics.
