= Karl Schöchlin =

Swiss rower

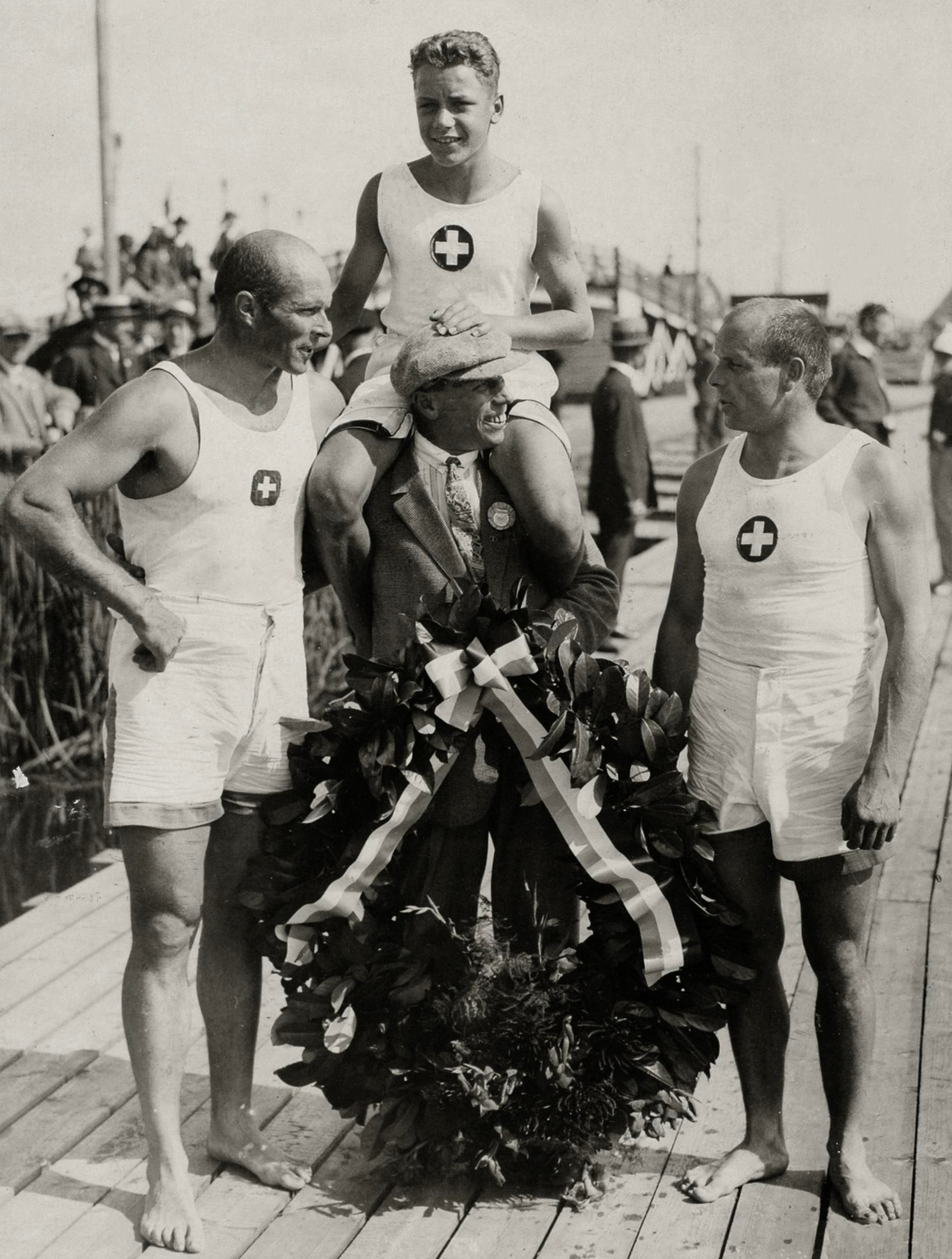
- Hans and Karl Schöchlin at the 1928 Olympics, with the coxswain Hans Bourquin in the middle

Personal information
- Full name: Karl F. Schöchlin
- Born: 13 June 1894
- Died: 7 November 1974 (aged 80)
- Relatives: Hans Schöchlin (brother)

Sport
- Sport: Rowing
- Club: Seeclub Biel
Medal record
Representing Switzerland
Olympic Games
Gold medal – first place	1928 Amsterdam	Coxed pair
European Rowing Championships
Silver medal – second place	1920 Mâcon	Double sculls
Gold medal – first place	1922 Barcelona	Double sculls
Silver medal – second place	1923 Como	Eight
Silver medal – second place	1924 Zürich	Eight
Gold medal – first place	1925 Prague	Eight
Silver medal – second place	1926 Lucerne	Coxed four
Silver medal – second place	1927 Como	Coxed four
Silver medal – second place	1930 Liège	Coxless four
Bronze medal – third place	1931 Paris	Coxed four

Karl F. Schöchlin (13 June 1894 – 7 November 1974) was a Swiss rower. Together with his elder brother Hans he won nine medals in various events at the European championships of 1920 to 1931. The brothers also won the gold medal in the coxed pair at the 1928 Summer Olympics.
