= Hans Schöchlin =

Swiss rower

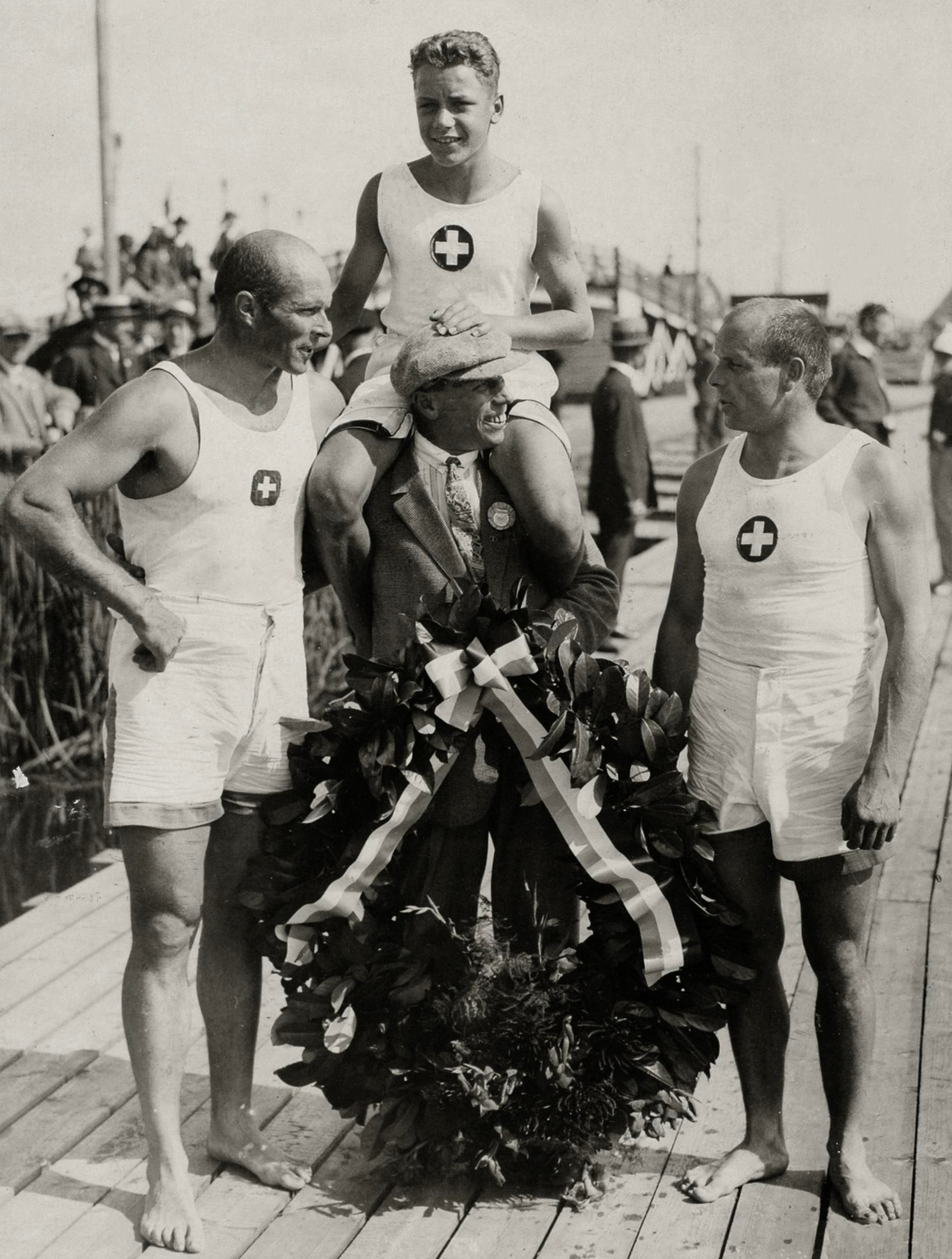
- Hans and Karl Schöchlin at the 1928 Olympics, with the coxswain Hans Bourquin in the middle

Personal information
- Born: 6 March 1893
- Died: 3 June 1978 (aged 85)
- Relatives: Karl Schöchlin (brother)

Sport
- Sport: Rowing
- Club: Seeclub Biel
Medal record
Representing Switzerland
Olympic Games
Gold medal – first place	1928 Amsterdam	Coxed pair
European Rowing Championships
Gold medal – first place	1922 Barcelona	Double sculls
Silver medal – second place	1923 Como	Eight
Silver medal – second place	1924 Zürich	Eight
Gold medal – first place	1925 Prague	Eight
Silver medal – second place	1926 Lucerne	Coxed four
Silver medal – second place	1927 Como	Coxed four
Silver medal – second place	1930 Liège	Coxless four
Bronze medal – third place	1931 Paris	Coxed four

Hans W. Schöchlin (6 March 1893 – 3 June 1978) was a Swiss rower. Together with his younger brother Karl he won eight medals in various events at the European championships of 1920 to 1931. The brothers also won the gold medal in the coxed pair event at the 1928 Summer Olympics. Later Hans took part in the 1936 Games, in the mixed literature event of the arts competition.
