= Tjapko van Bergen =

Dutch rower (1903–1944)

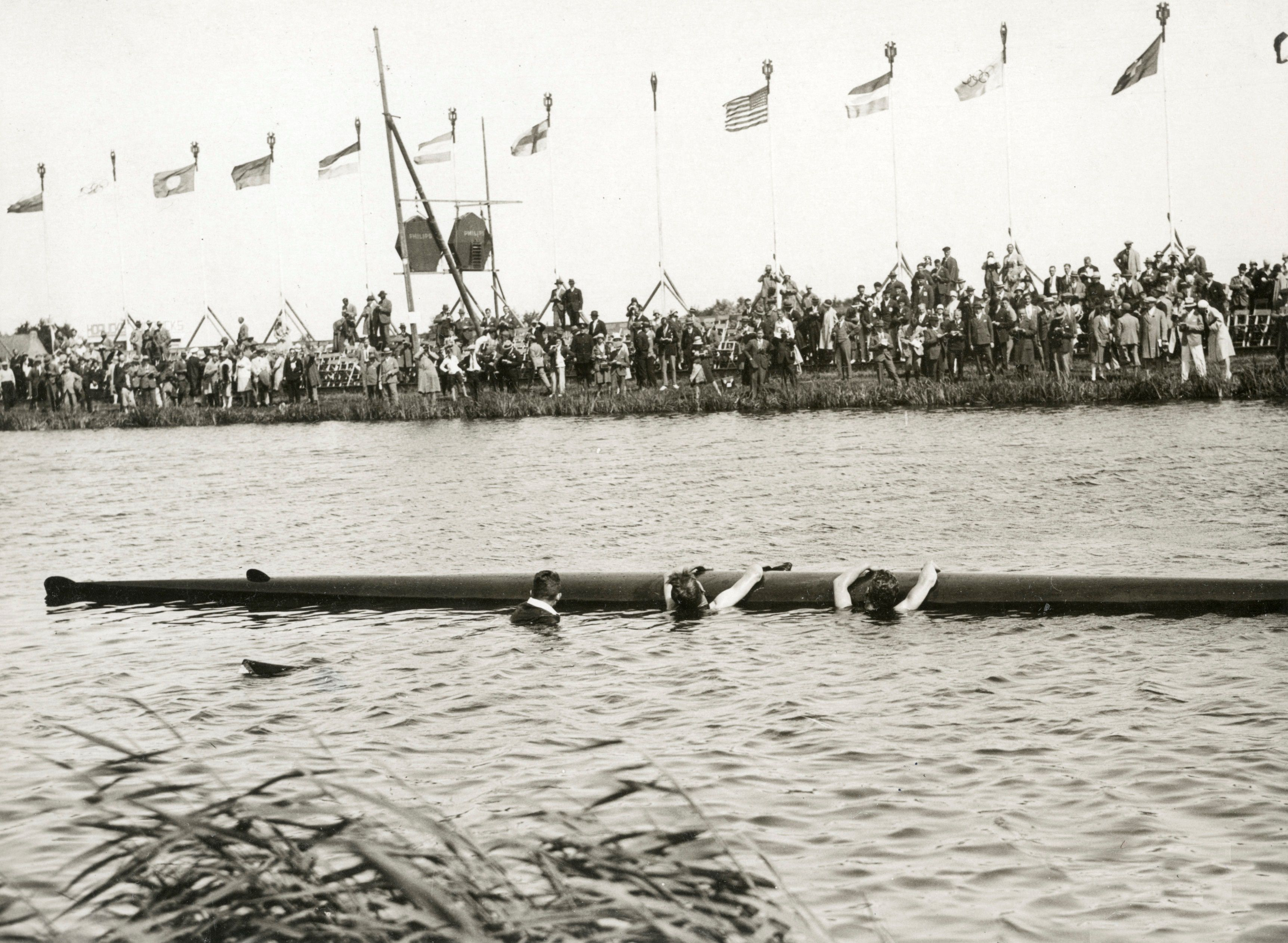
- Van Bergen and Dusseldorp capsize in the 1928 Olympics

Personal information
- Nationality: Dutch
- Born: 26 March 1903 Heiligerlee, Groningen, Kingdom of the Netherlands
- Died: 2 February 1944 (aged 40) Krakolye, Russian SFSR, Soviet Union
- Political party: National Socialist Movement in the Netherlands
- Military career
- Allegiance: Germany
- Branch: Waffen-SS
- Service years: 194?–1944
- Rank: Rottenführer
- Conflicts: World War II; Eastern Front †

Sport
- Sport: Rowing

Tjapko Antoon van Bergen (March 26, 1903 – February 2, 1944) was a Dutch rower. He competed at the 1928 Summer Olympics in the men's coxed pair with Cornelis Dusseldorp; their boat capsized in the first round and they did not finish.

Van Bergen became a member of the National Socialist Movement in the Netherlands (NSB), the fascist and later Nazi organization that collaborated with the German occupier during World War II. He joined the Waffen-SS and attained the rank of Rottenführer; he died near Narva, in Estonia, on the Eastern Front.
