= Thomas Mack =

Thomas Mack may refer to:

- Tom Mack, American football player
- Thomas Mack (rowing), American coxswain
- Thomas Mack (restaurateur), German restaurateur and hotelier

== See also ==
- Thomas & Mack Center, a multi-purpose arena on the campus of the University of Nevada, Las Vegas
