= Renzo Vestrini =

Italian rower (1906–1976)

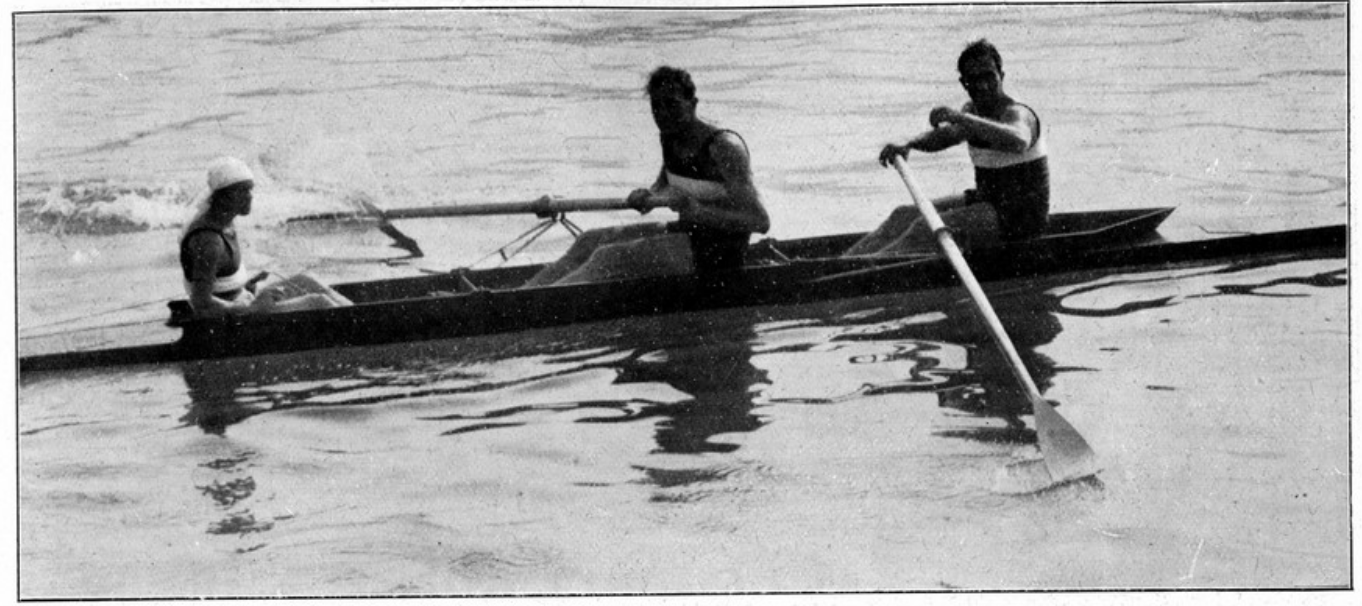
- The brothers Renzo Vestrini and Pier Luigi Vestrini in a coxed pair as winners of the Italian Rowing Championships of Pallanza on Lake Verbano in 1929

Personal information
- Born: 22 May 1906 Florence, Italy
- Died: 29 October 1976 (aged 70) Maracaibo, Venezuela
- Relatives: Pier Luigi Vestrini (brother); Roberto Vestrini (brother)

Sport
- Sport: Rowing
Medal record
Men's rowing
Representing Italy
European Rowing Championships
Silver medal – second place	1926 Lucerne	Coxed pair
Gold medal – first place	1927 Como	Coxless pair
Gold medal – first place	1927 Como	Coxed pair
Gold medal – first place	1929 Bydgoszcz	Coxed pair

Renzo Vestrini (22 May 1906 – 29 October 1976) was an Italian rower. He competed at the 1928 Summer Olympics in Amsterdam with the men's coxed pair where they did not finish in the quarter-final. Two brothers, Pier Luigi Vestrini and Roberto Vestrini, were also Olympic rowers.
