= Pier Luigi Vestrini =

Italian rower (1905–1989)

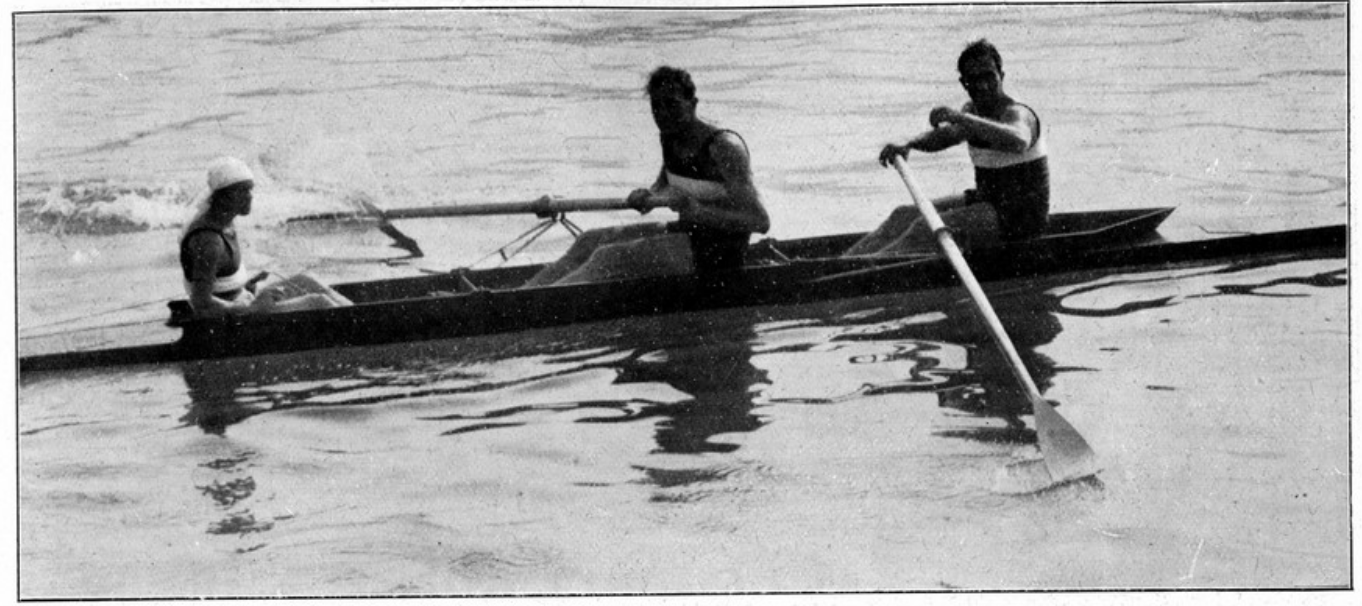
- The brothers Renzo Vestrini and Pier Luigi Vestrini in a coxed pair as winners of the Italian Rowing Championships of Pallanza on Lake Verbano in 1929

Personal information
- Born: 26 January 1905 Florence, Italy
- Died: 30 November 1989 (aged 84)
- Relatives: Roberto Vestrini (brother); Renzo Vestrini (brother)

Sport
- Sport: Rowing
Medal record
Men's rowing
Representing Italy
European Rowing Championships
Silver medal – second place	1926 Lucerne	Coxed pair
Gold medal – first place	1927 Como	Coxless pair
Gold medal – first place	1927 Como	Coxed pair
Gold medal – first place	1929 Bydgoszcz	Coxed pair

Pier Luigi Vestrini (26 January 1905 – 30 November 1989) was an Italian rower. He competed at the 1928 Summer Olympics in Amsterdam with the men's coxed pair where they did not finish in the quarter final. Two brothers, Roberto Vestrini and Renzo Vestrini, were also Olympic rowers.
