= Roberto Vestrini =

Italian rower

Personal information
- Born: 30 January 1908 Livorno, Italy
- Died: 12 March 1966 (aged 58)
- Height: 173 cm (5 ft 8 in)
- Relatives: Pier Luigi Vestrini (brother); Renzo Vestrini (brother)

Sport
- Sport: Rowing
- Club: U.C. Livornesi, Livorno
Medal record
Men's rowing
Representing Italy
Olympic Games
| Silver medal – second place | 1932 Los Angeles | Eight |
European Rowing Championships
| Gold medal – first place | 1929 Bydgoszcz | Eight |
| Silver medal – second place | 1930 Liège | Eight |

Roberto Vestrini (30 January 1908 – 12 March 1966) was an Italian rower who competed in the 1928 Summer Olympics and in the 1932 Summer Olympics.

He won the silver medal as member of the Italian boat in the men's eight competition. Two brothers, Pier Luigi Vestrini and Renzo Vestrini, were also Olympic rowers.
