= Édouard Marcelle =

French rower

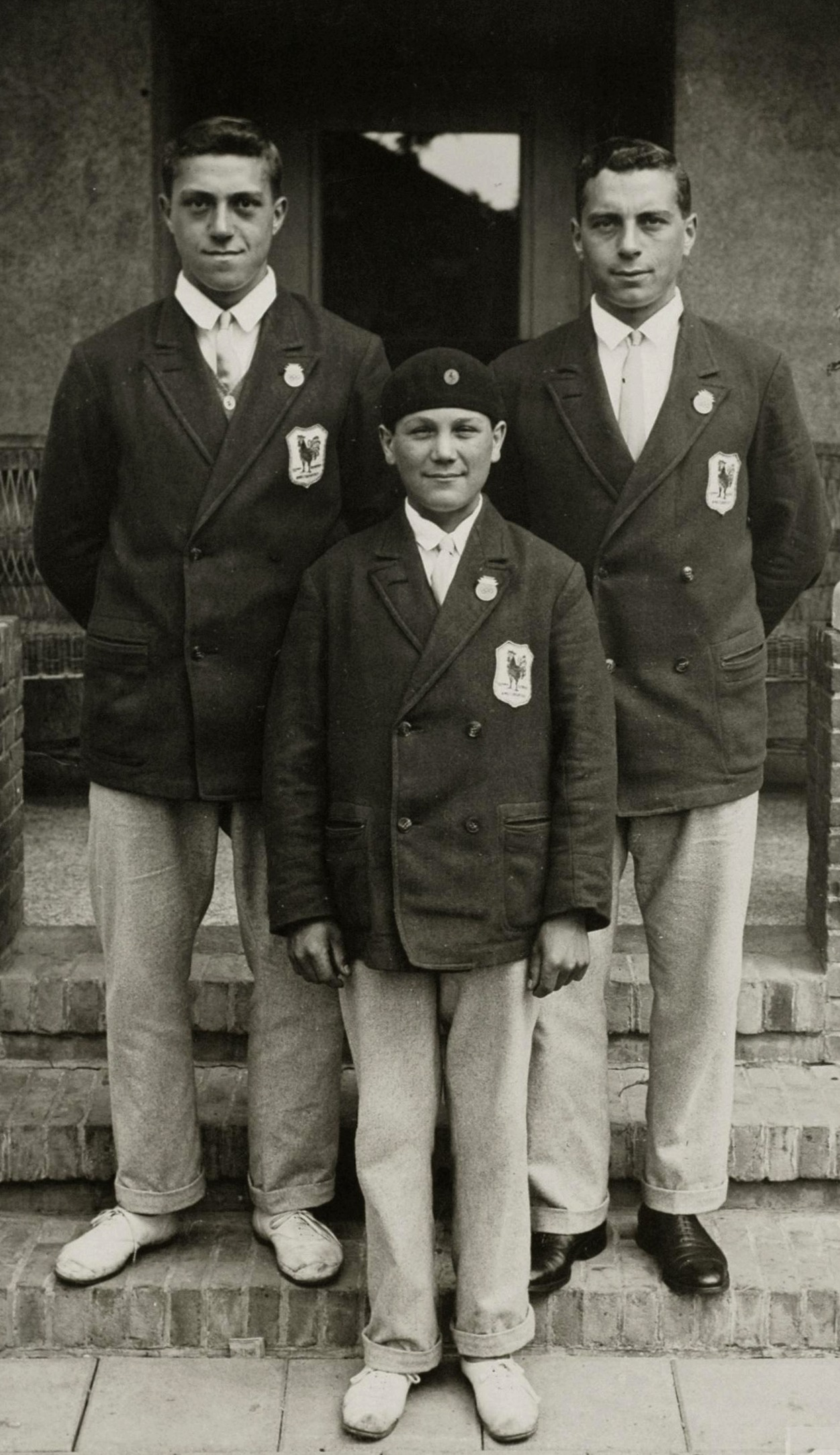
- Armand and Édouard Marcelle (right) at the 1928 Olympics

Personal information
- Born: 1 October 1909 Rheims, France
- Died: 9 November 2001 (aged 92) Rheims, France

Sport
- Sport: Rowing
- Club: Régates Rémoises, Reims
Medal record
Representing France
Olympic Games
Silver medal – second place	1928 Amsterdam	Coxed pair

Édouard Marcelle (1 October 1909 – 9 November 2001) was a French rower who won a silver medal in the coxed pairs at the 1928 Summer Olympics, together with his elder brother Armand.
