= Léon Flament =

Belgian rower

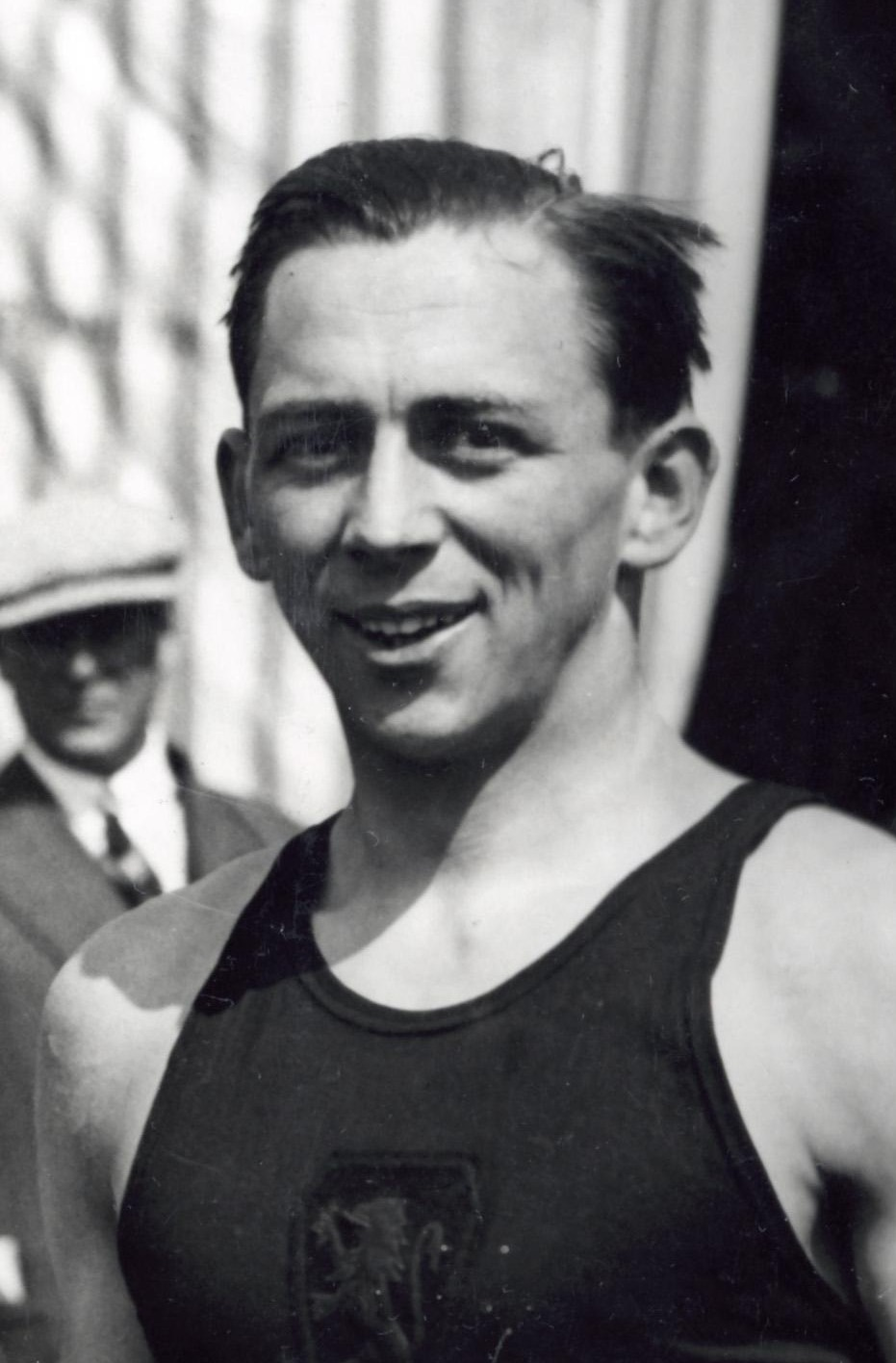
- Flament in 1928

Medal record

Men's rowing

Olympic Games
Bronze medal – third place	1928 Amsterdam	Coxed pair

Léon Flament (born 26 May 1906, date of death unknown) was a Belgian rower who won a bronze medal in the coxed pair at the 1928 Summer Olympics.
