= Hendrik Smits =

Dutch rower

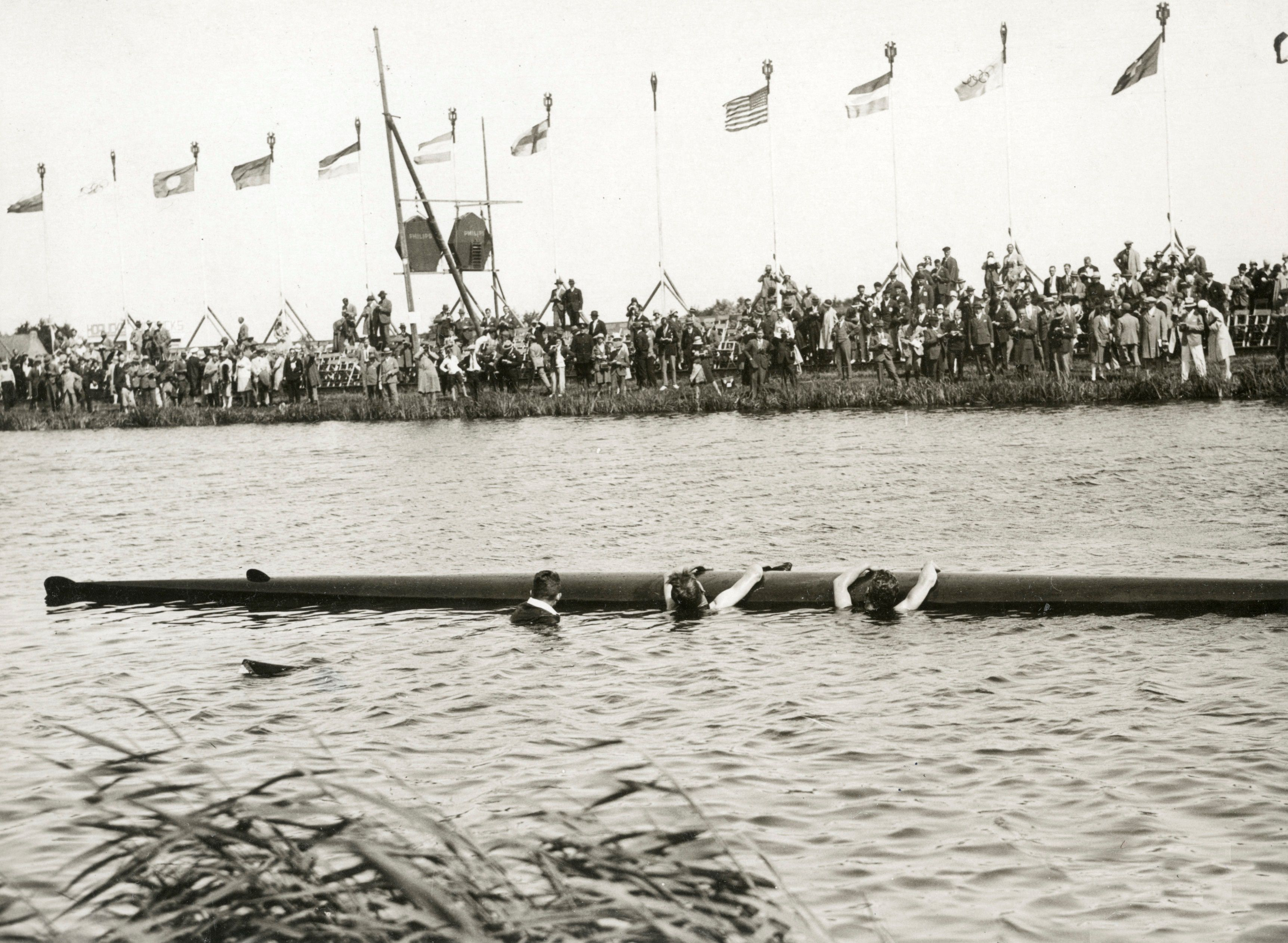
- Capsized boat at the 1928 Summer Olympics

Personal information
- Nationality: Dutch
- Born: 9 December 1907; Tapa Toean, Dutch East Indies
- Died: 12 September 1976 (aged 68); Bussum, Netherlands

Sport
- Sport: Rowing

Hendrik Smits (9 December 1907 – 12 September 1976) was a Dutch rower. He competed in the men's coxed pair event at the 1928 Summer Olympics.
