= Georges Anthony =

Belgian rower

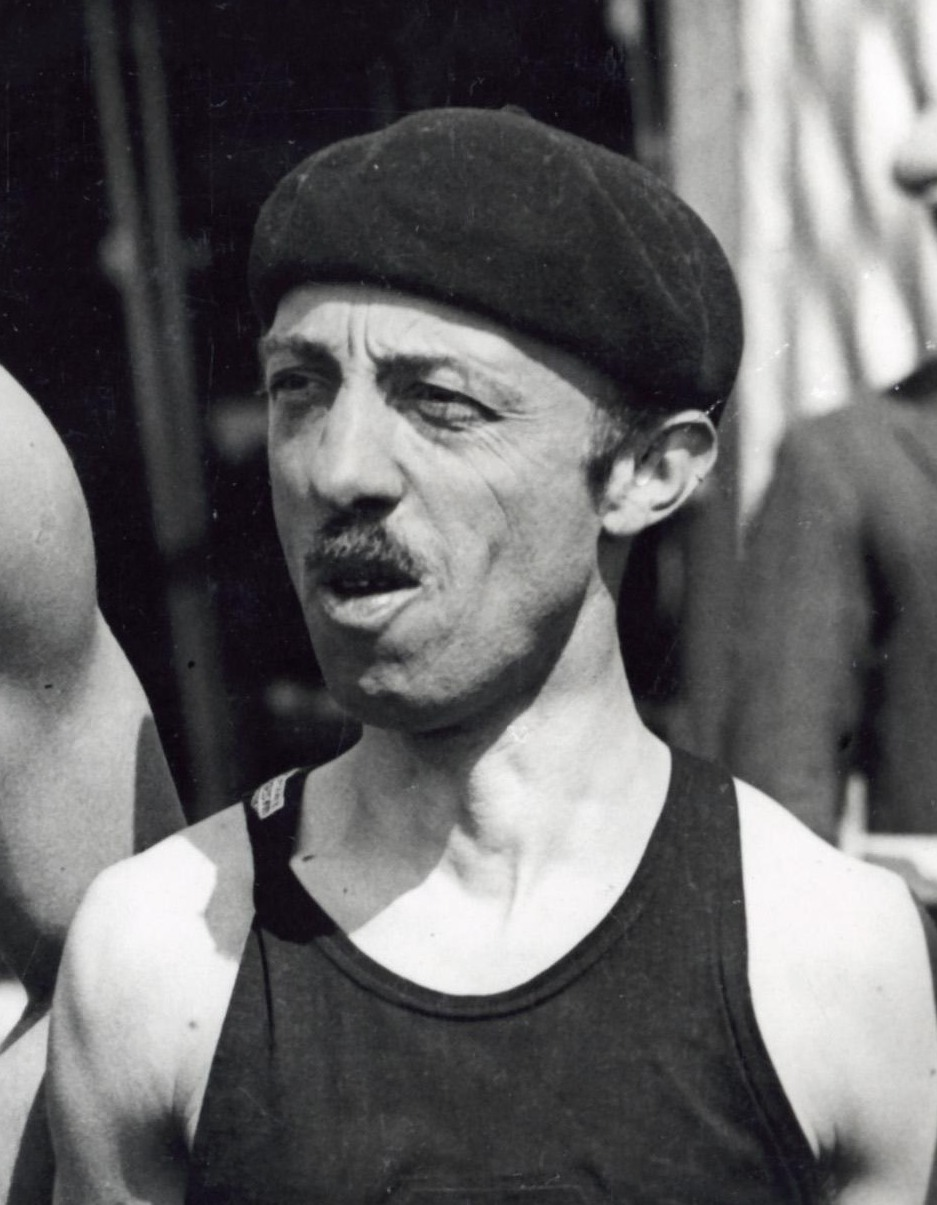
- Anthony in 1928

Medal record

Men's rowing

Representing Belgium

Olympic Games
Bronze medal – third place	1928 Amsterdam	Coxed pair

Georges Charles Marie Adolphe Antony (born 26 November 1890) was a Belgian rowing coxswain who won a bronze medal in the coxed pair at the 1928 Summer Olympics. He also took part in the eight event, but his team failed to reach the final. He was born in Liège.
