= François de Coninck =

Belgian rower

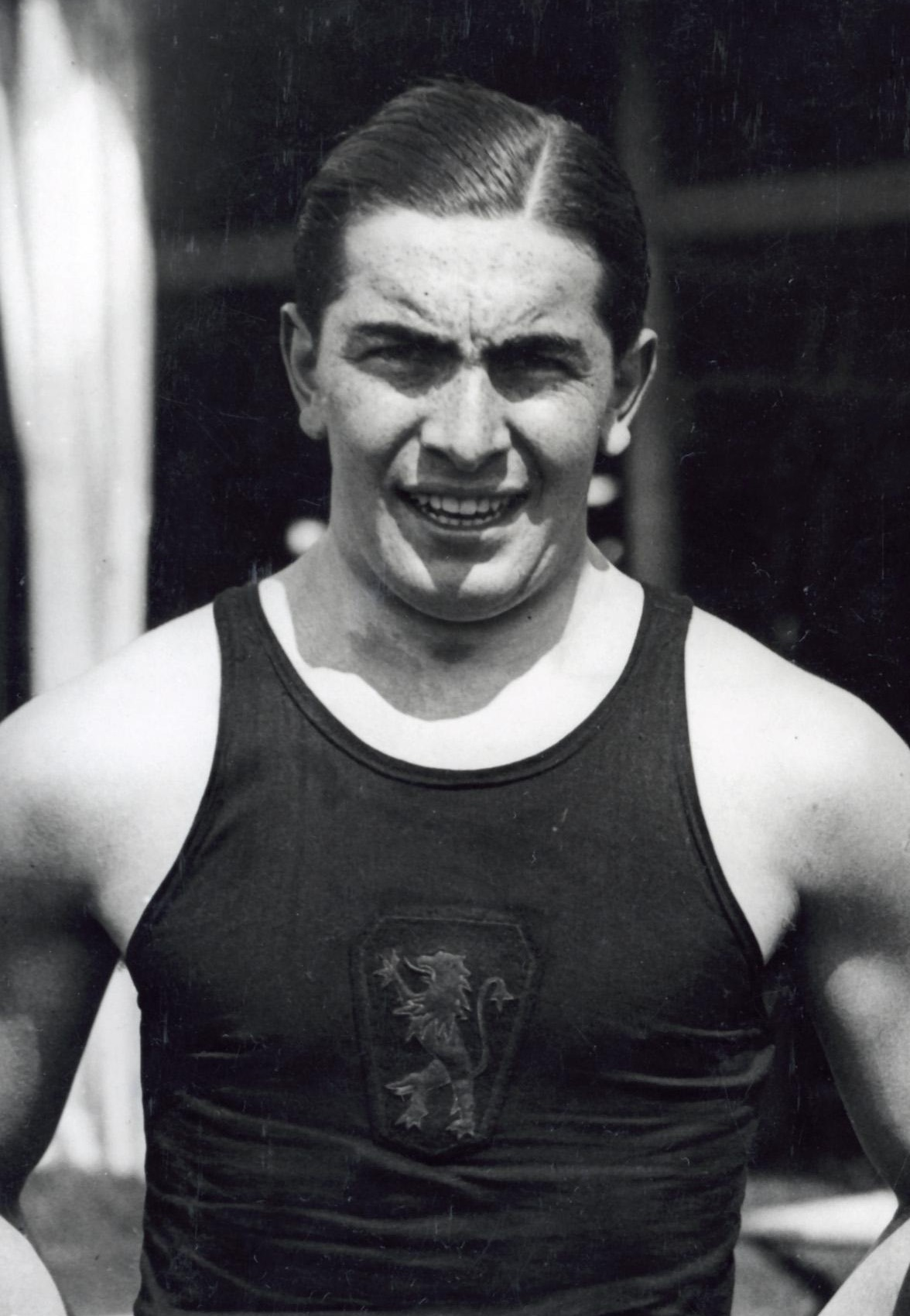
- Francois de Coninck in 1928

Medal record

Men's rowing

Olympic Games
Bronze medal – third place	1928 Amsterdam	Coxed pair

François de Coninck (9 August 1902 – 21 September 1985) was a Belgian rower who won a bronze medal in the coxed pair at the 1928 Summer Olympics.
