= Augustus Goetz =

American rower

Personal information
- Born: August 21, 1904 Philadelphia, United States
- Died: December 7, 1976 (aged 72) Ocean City, New Jersey, United States

Sport
- Sport: Rowing

Augustus Goetz (August 21, 1904 – December 7, 1976) was an American rower. He competed in the men's coxed pair event at the 1928 Summer Olympics.
