= Armand Marcelle =

French rower (1905–1974)

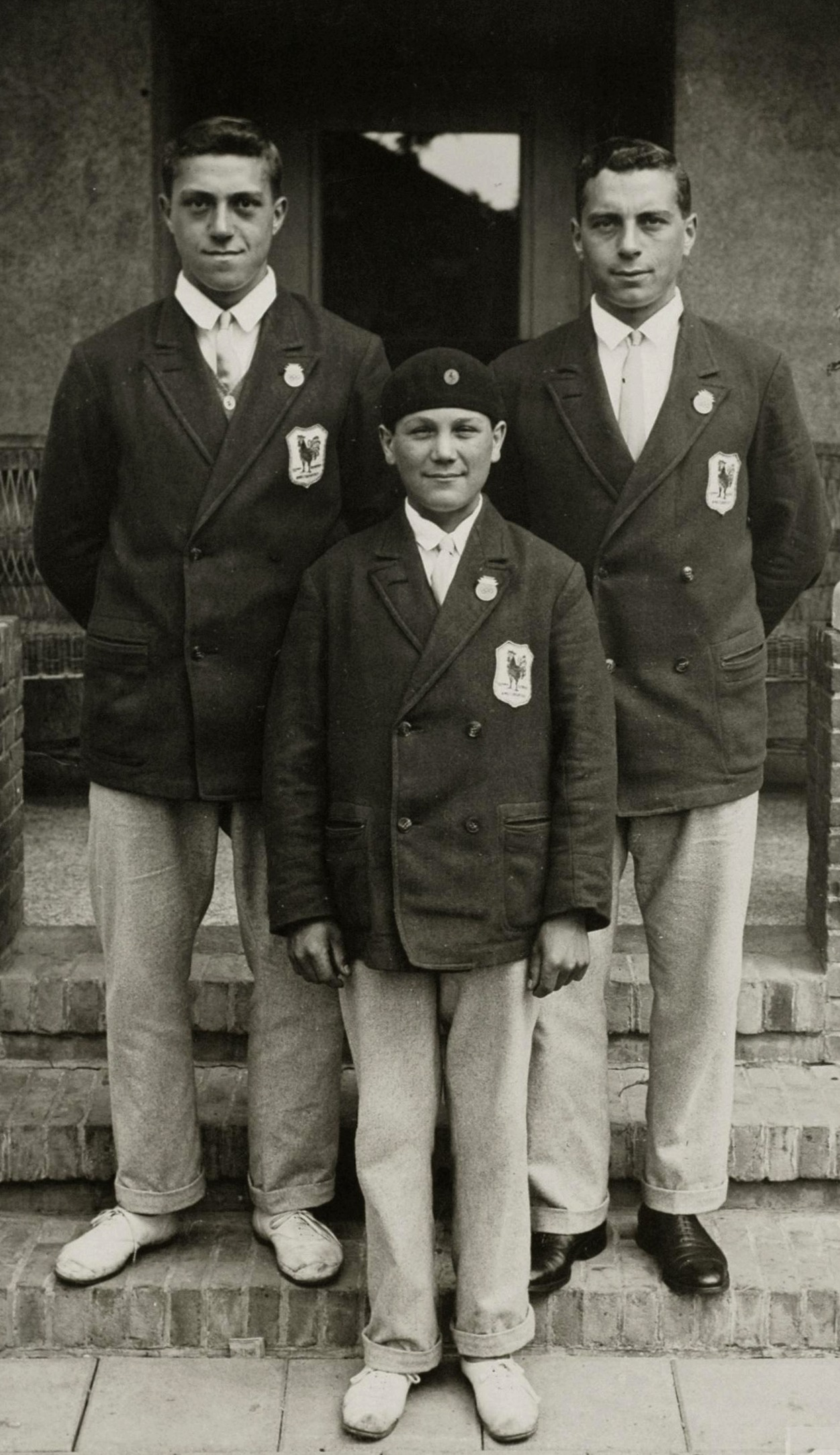
- Armand (left) and Édouard Marcelle at the 1928 Olympics

Personal information
- Born: 10 October 1905 Rheims, France
- Died: 26 December 1974 (aged 69) Rheims, France

Sport
- Sport: Rowing
- Club: Régates Rémoises, Reims
Medal record
Representing France
Olympic Games
Silver medal – second place	1928 Amsterdam	Coxed pair

Armand Marcelle (10 October 1905 – 26 December 1974) was a French rower who won a silver medal in the coxed pairs at the 1928 Summer Olympics, together with his younger brother Édouard.
