= Rowing at the 1928 Summer Olympics – Men's coxed pair =

Olympic rowing event

Men's coxed pair at the Games of the IX Olympiad
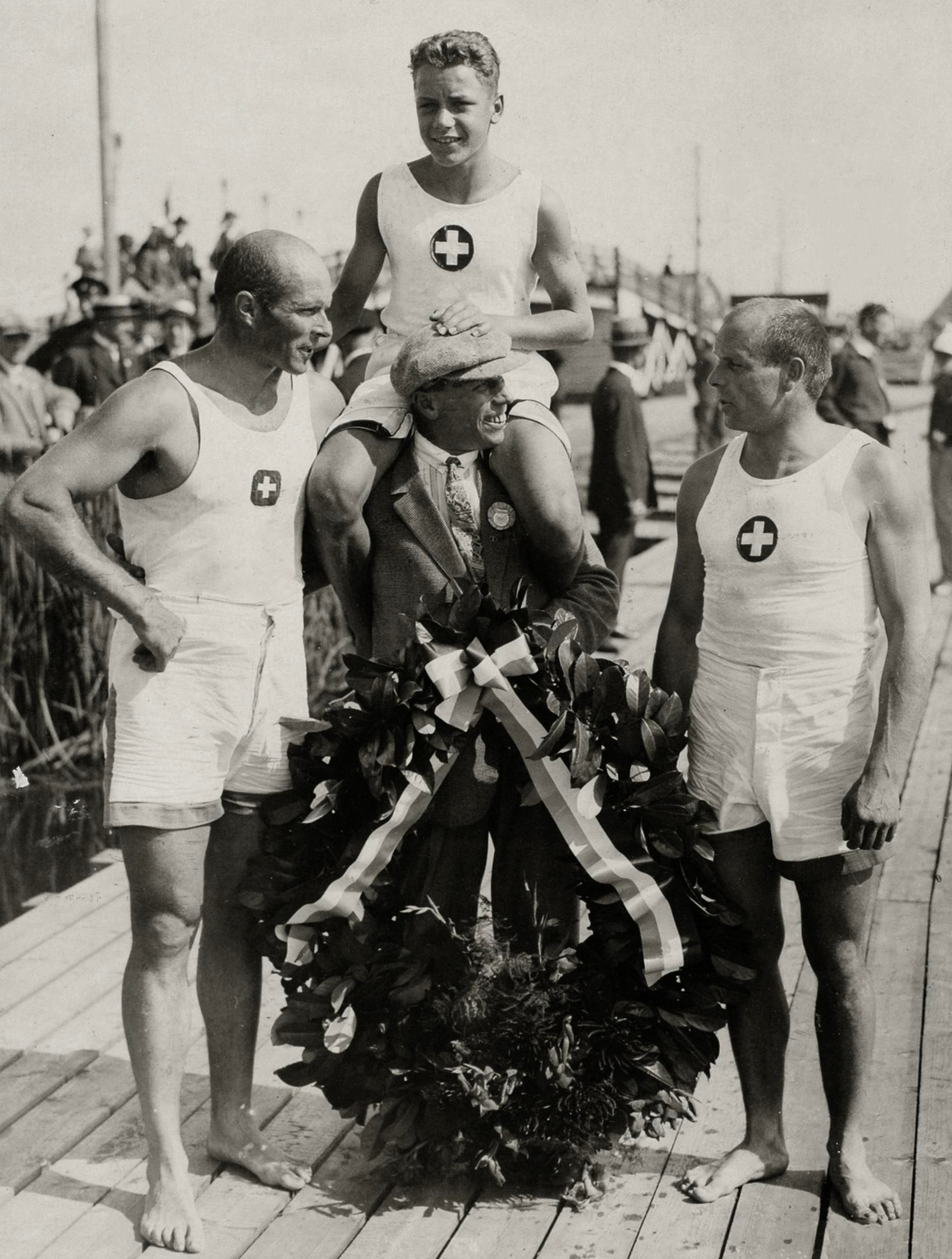
- Gold medal team Hans Schöchlin, Hans Bourquin, and Karl Schöchlin
- Venue: Sloten
- Dates: 3–10 August 1928
- Competitors: 18 from 6 nations
- Winning time: 7:42.6

Medalists
| 1st place, gold medalist(s) | | Hans Schöchlin; Karl Schöchlin; Hans Bourquin (cox); Switzerland |
| 2nd place, silver medalist(s) | | Armand Marcelle; Édouard Marcelle; Henri Préaux (cox); France |
| 3rd place, bronze medalist(s) | | Léon Flament; François de Coninck; Georges Anthony (cox); Belgium |

The men's coxed pair event was part of the rowing programme at the 1928 Summer Olympics. It was one of seven rowing events for men and was the fourth appearance of the event. It was held from 3 to 10 August near Sloten, Amsterdam. There were 6 boats (18 competitors) from 6 nations, with each nation limited to one boat in the event. The event was won by the Swiss team, the nation's second consecutive victory in the event. Brothers Hans Schöchlin and Karl Schöchlin rowed, with Hans Bourquin the coxswain. Another pair of brothers took silver: France's Armand Marcelle and Édouard Marcelle (along with cox Henri Préaux). The Belgian bronze medal team consisted of Léon Flament, François de Coninck, and Georges Anthony; it was the nation's first medal in the event.

== Background ==
This was the fourth appearance of the event. Rowing had been on the programme in 1896 but was cancelled due to bad weather. The men's coxed pair was one of the original four events in 1900, but was not held in 1904, 1908, or 1912. It returned to the programme after World War I and was held every Games from 1924 to 1992, when it (along with the men's coxed four) was replaced with the men's lightweight double sculls and men's lightweight coxless four.

None of the crew members from the 1924 coxed pair event returned. The most accomplished crew was likely the Swiss Schöchlin brothers, who had won the European championship in double sculls in 1922 and had been members of the European champion eight team in 1925.

No nations made their debut in the event; the field consisted of all six nations that had competed previously. Belgium and France each made their fourth appearance, the two nations to have competed in all three prior editions.

== Competition format ==
The coxed pair event featured three-person boats, with two rowers and a coxswain. It was a sweep rowing event, with the rowers each having one oar (and thus each rowing on one side). In a very unusual situation, the competition featured as many rounds as there were boats: six. There were four main rounds and two repechages. The course used the 2000 metres distance that became the Olympic standard in 1912.

- Heats: There were three heats of 2 boats each. The winner of each advanced to the quarterfinals, while the loser of each went to the first repechage. (Because the Dutch team did not finish, it was eliminated instead of going to the repechage.)
- First repechage: There was a single heat of 2 boats. The winner advanced to the quarterfinals, with the loser eliminated.
- Quarterfinals: There were two heats of 2 boats each. The winner of each advanced to the semifinals; the loser went to a second repechage, as long as it had not already been to the first repechage. (Italy did not finish, so was eliminated instead of going to the repechage.)
- Second repechage: With only one boat in the second repechage, there was no competition and Belgium advanced to the semifinals.
- Semifinals: There were two semifinals; winners advanced to the final. With three boats remaining, one of the semifinals was a walkover. The loser of the other received bronze.
- Final: A single final of two boats for gold and silver medals.

== Schedule ==
| Date | Time | Round |
|---|---|---|
| Friday, 3 August 1928 | | Round 1 |
| Saturday, 4 August 1928 | | First repechage |
| Monday, 6 August 1928 | | Quarterfinals |
| Tuesday, 7 August 1928 | | Second repechage |
| Wednesday, 8 August 1928 | | Semifinals |
| Friday, 10 August 1928 | | Final |

== Results ==
Source: Official results; De Wael

=== Round 1 ===
Winners advanced to the second round. Losers competed in the first repechage.

==== Heat 1 ====
| Rank | Rowers | Coxswain | Nation | Time | Notes |
|---|---|---|---|---|---|
| 1 | Hans Schöchlin, Karl Schöchlin | Hans Bourquin | Switzerland | 8:41.2 | Q |
| 2 | Armand Marcelle, Édouard Marcelle | Henri Préaux | France | 8:41.4 | R |

==== Heat 2 ====
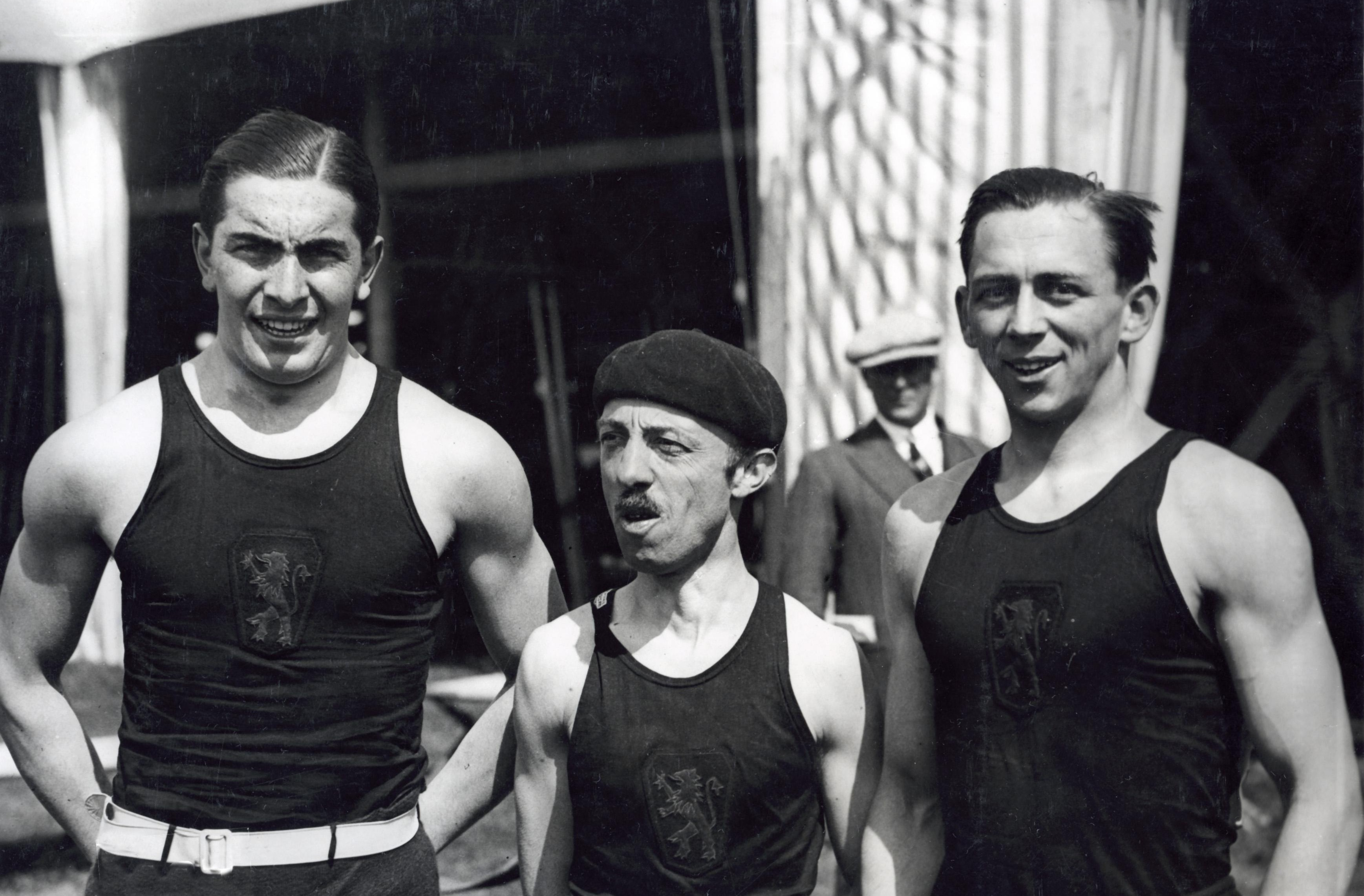
The Belgium team of de Coninck, Anthony, and Flament (from left)

| Rank | Rowers | Coxswain | Nation | Time | Notes |
|---|---|---|---|---|---|
| 1 | Léon Flament, François de Coninck | Georges Anthony | Belgium | 8:58.4 | Q |
| 2 | Tjapko van Bergen, Cornelis Dusseldorp | Hendrik Smits | Netherlands | DNF | |

==== Heat 3 ====
| Rank | Rowers | Coxswain | Nation | Time | Notes |
|---|---|---|---|---|---|
| 1 | Pier Luigi Vestrini, Renzo Vestrini | Cesare Milani | Italy | 8:42.0 | Q |
| 2 | Augustus Goetz, Joe Dougherty | Thomas Mack | United States | 8:44.8 | R |

=== First repechage ===
Winners advanced to the second round, but were ineligible for a second repechage if they lost there. Losers were eliminated.

| Rank | Rowers | Coxswain | Nation | Time | Notes |
|---|---|---|---|---|---|
| 1 | Armand Marcelle, Édouard Marcelle | Henri Préaux | France | 8:37.2 | Q |
| 2 | Augustus Goetz, Joe Dougherty | Thomas Mack | United States | 8:41.2 | |

=== Quarterfinals ===
Winners advanced to the semifinals. Losers competed in the second repechage, if they had advanced by winning in the first round, or were eliminated if they had advanced through the first repechage.

==== Quarterfinal 1 ====
| Rank | Rowers | Coxswain | Nation | Time | Notes |
|---|---|---|---|---|---|
| 1 | Hans Schöchlin, Karl Schöchlin | Hans Bourquin | Switzerland | 7:41.8 | Q |
| 2 | Pier Luigi Vestrini, Renzo Vestrini | Cesare Milani | Italy | DNF | |

==== Quarterfinal 2 ====
| Rank | Rowers | Coxswain | Nation | Time | Notes |
|---|---|---|---|---|---|
| 1 | Armand Marcelle, Édouard Marcelle | Henri Préaux | France | 7:53.4 | Q |
| 2 | Léon Flament, François de Coninck | Georges Anthony | Belgium | 8:02.4 | R |

=== Second repechage ===
Italy had not finished the second round, so Belgium was the only team to qualify for the second repechage, receiving a bye to the semifinals.

| Rank | Rowers | Coxswain | Nation | Time | Notes |
|---|---|---|---|---|---|
| 1 | Léon Flament, François de Coninck | Georges Anthony | Belgium | Bye | Q |

=== Semifinals ===
Switzerland advanced uncontested to the gold medal final, and was joined by France after France won the only semifinal against Belgium. Belgium received the bronze.

==== Semifinal 1 ====
| Rank | Rowers | Coxswain | Nation | Time | Notes |
|---|---|---|---|---|---|
| 1 | Armand Marcelle, Édouard Marcelle | Henri Préaux | France | 7:48.2 | Q |
| 3rd place, bronze medalist(s) | Léon Flament, François de Coninck | Georges Anthony | Belgium | 7:59.4 | |

==== Semifinal 2 ====
| Rank | Rowers | Coxswain | Nation | Time | Notes |
|---|---|---|---|---|---|
| 1 | Hans Schöchlin, Karl Schöchlin | Hans Bourquin | Switzerland | 8:02.0 | Q |

=== Final ===
| Rank | Rowers | Coxswain | Nation | Time |
|---|---|---|---|---|
| 1st place, gold medalist(s) | Hans Schöchlin, Karl Schöchlin | Hans Bourquin | Switzerland | 7:42.6 |
| 2nd place, silver medalist(s) | Armand Marcelle, Édouard Marcelle | Henri Préaux | France | 7:48.4 |

== Results summary ==
| Rank | Rowers | Coxswain | Nation | Round 1 | First repechage | Quarterfinals | Second repechage | Semifinals | Final |
|---|---|---|---|---|---|---|---|---|---|
| 1st place, gold medalist(s) | Hans Schöchlin, Karl Schöchlin | Hans Bourquin | Switzerland | 8:41.2 | Bye | 7:41.8 | Bye | 8:02.0 | 7:42.6 |
| 2nd place, silver medalist(s) | Armand Marcelle, Édouard Marcelle | Henri Préaux | France | 8:41.4 | 8:37.2 | 7:53.4 | Bye | 7:48.2 | 7:48.4 |
| 3rd place, bronze medalist(s) | Léon Flament, François de Coninck | Georges Anthony | Belgium | 8:58.4 | Bye | 8:02.4 | Walkover | 7:59.4 | Did not advance |
| 4 | Pier Luigi Vestrini, Renzo Vestrini | Cesare Milani | Italy | 8:42.0 | Bye | DNF | Did not advance | | |
| 5 | Augustus Goetz, Joe Dougherty | Thomas Mack | United States | 8:44.8 | 8:41.2 | Did not advance | | | |
| 6 | Tjapko van Bergen, Cornelis Dusseldorp | Hendrik Smits | Netherlands | DNF | Did not advance | | | | |
