= Cornelis Dusseldorp =

Dutch rower

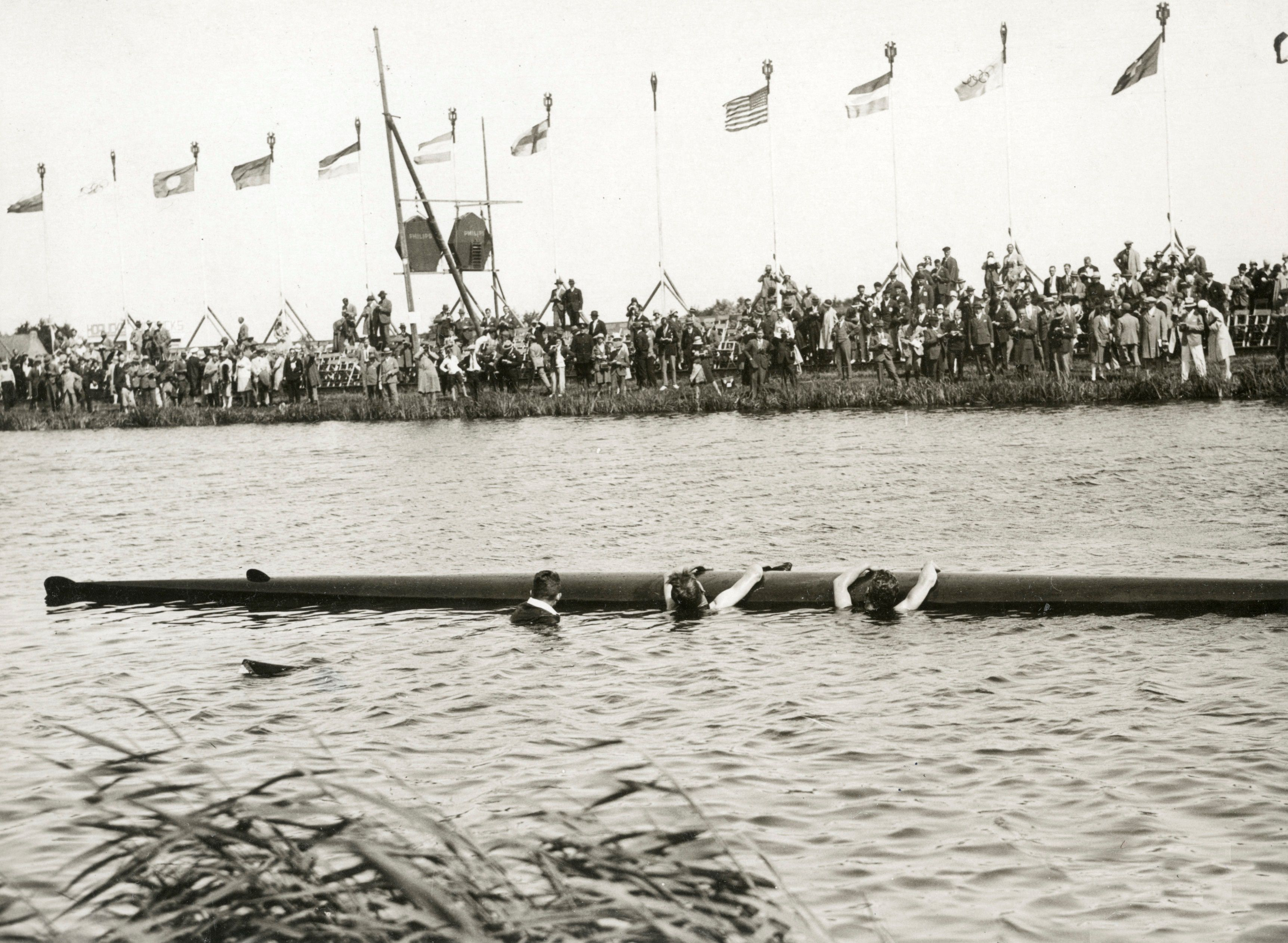
- Capsized boat at the 1928 Summer Olympics

Personal information
- Nationality: Dutch
- Born: 28 June 1908; Gombong, Dutch East Indies
- Died: 11 March 1990 (aged 81); Luton, England

Sport
- Sport: Rowing

Cornelis Dusseldorp (28 June 1908 – 11 March 1990) was a Dutch rower. He competed in the men's coxed pair event at the 1928 Summer Olympics.
