= Thomas Mack (rowing) =

American coxswain

Thomas Mack, Jr.
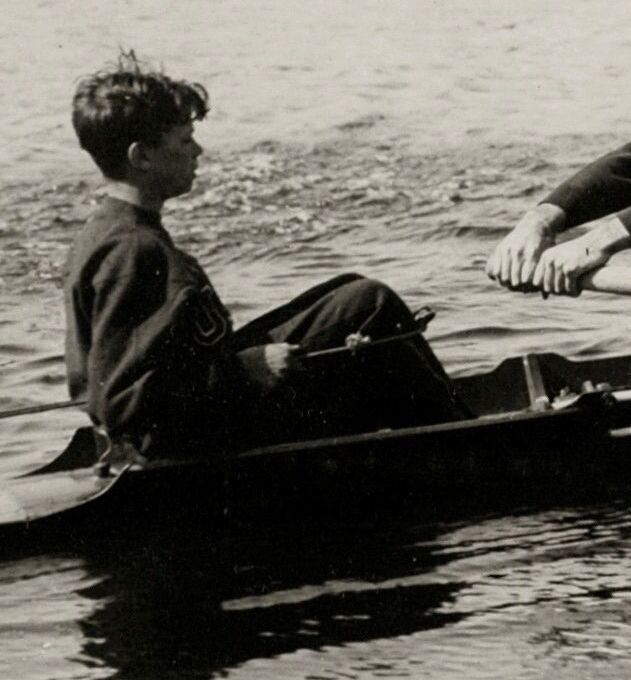
- Thomas Mack (1928)

Personal information
- Born: Thomas P. Mack; 26 November 1913 Philadelphia, United States
- Died: 7 October 2002 (aged 88) Oswego, Illinois, United States
- Height: 147 cm (4 ft 10 in)
- Weight: 41 kg (90 lb)

Sport
- Sport: Rowing
- Club: Penn AC, Philadelphia
Medal record
Men's rowing
Representing the United States
European Rowing Championships
| Gold medal – first place | 1930 Liège | Eight |

Thomas P. Mack Jr. (26 November 1913 – 7 October 2002) was an American coxswain. He competed at the 1928 Summer Olympics in Amsterdam with the men's coxed pair where they were eliminated in the round one repechage.
