= Régates rémoises =

Régates Rémoises, originally known as the Société Nautique des Régates Rémoises, is a major French rowing club in Reims, France. It was founded in 1854.

== History ==
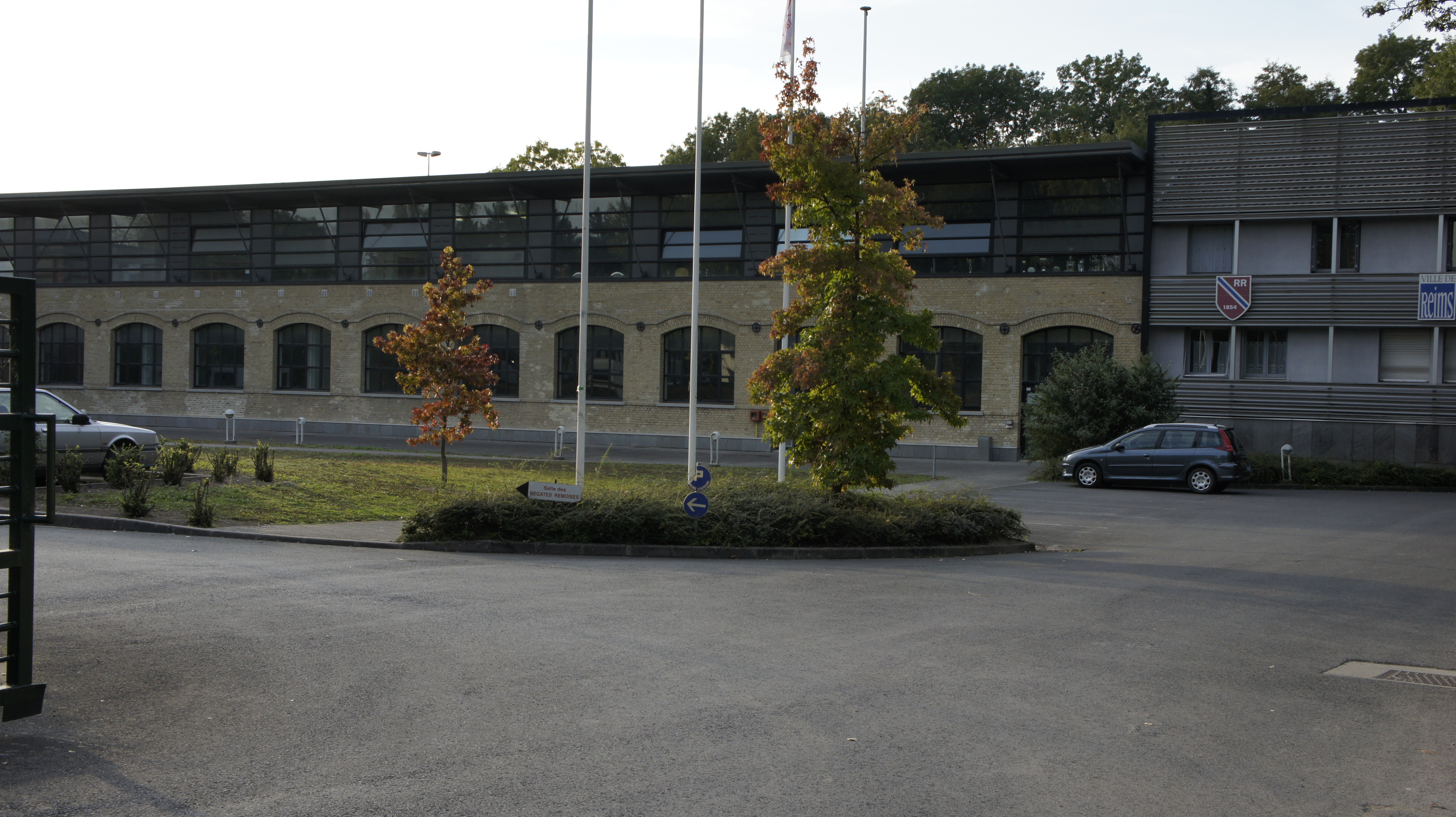
The club's main building is classified as a Monument historique.

The club was founded in 1854, 16 years after the Société des régates du Harvre (the oldest French rowing club, founded in 1838. It is among the oldest surviving sports clubs in the world.

Between 1995 and 2008, the club was consistently placed among the top three rowing clubs in France. In 1995 and 1996, between 2003 and 2005, and in 2008, the club was ranked first. It has experienced a slight decline in fortunes since 2013, having fallen to 18th position, and more recently to 20th.

It was the most successful club for women's rowing in France between 2003 and 2008.

Training takes place on the canal de l'Aisne à la Marne.

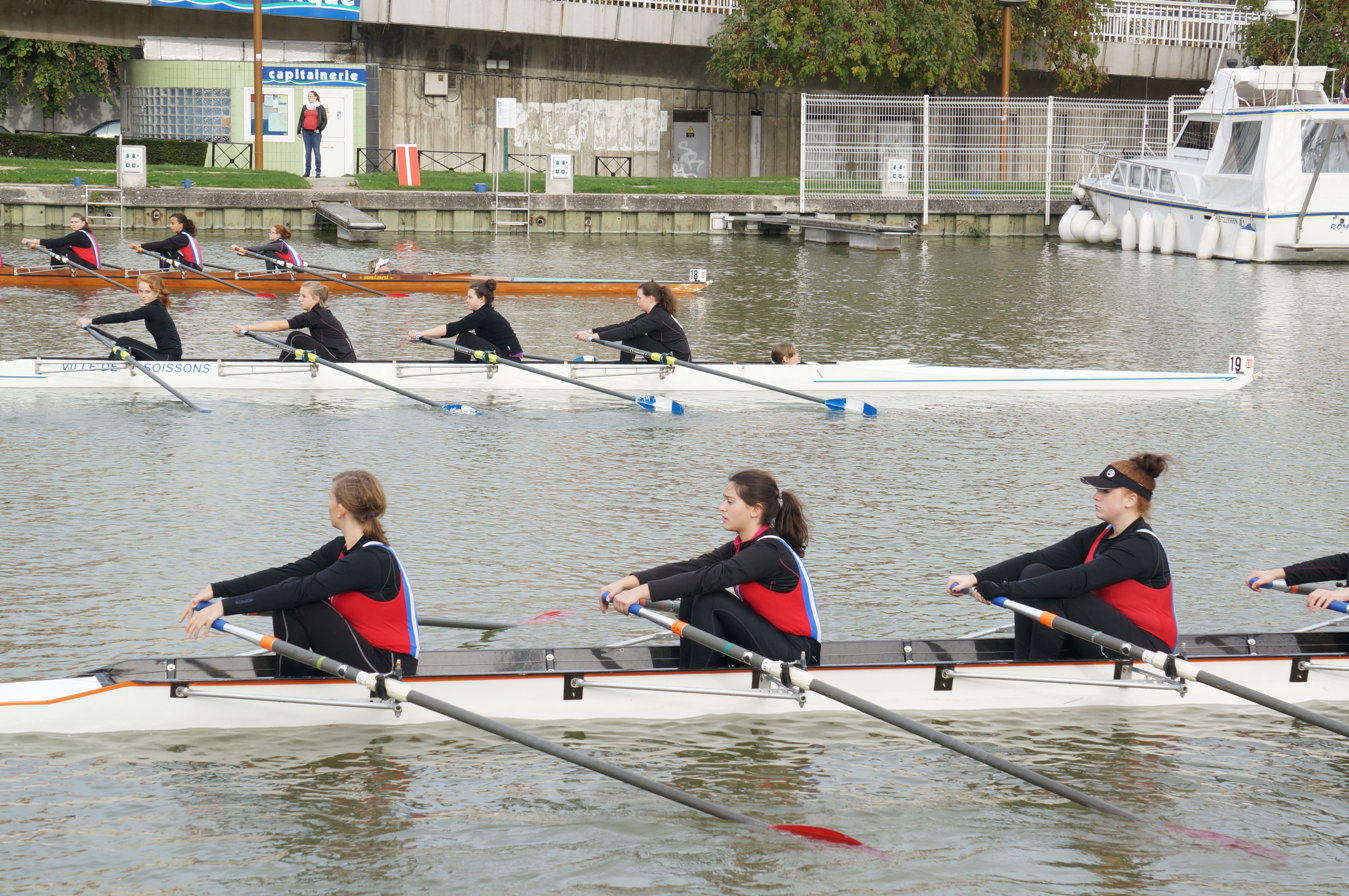
A race taking place on the canal in 2013.

== Squads ==
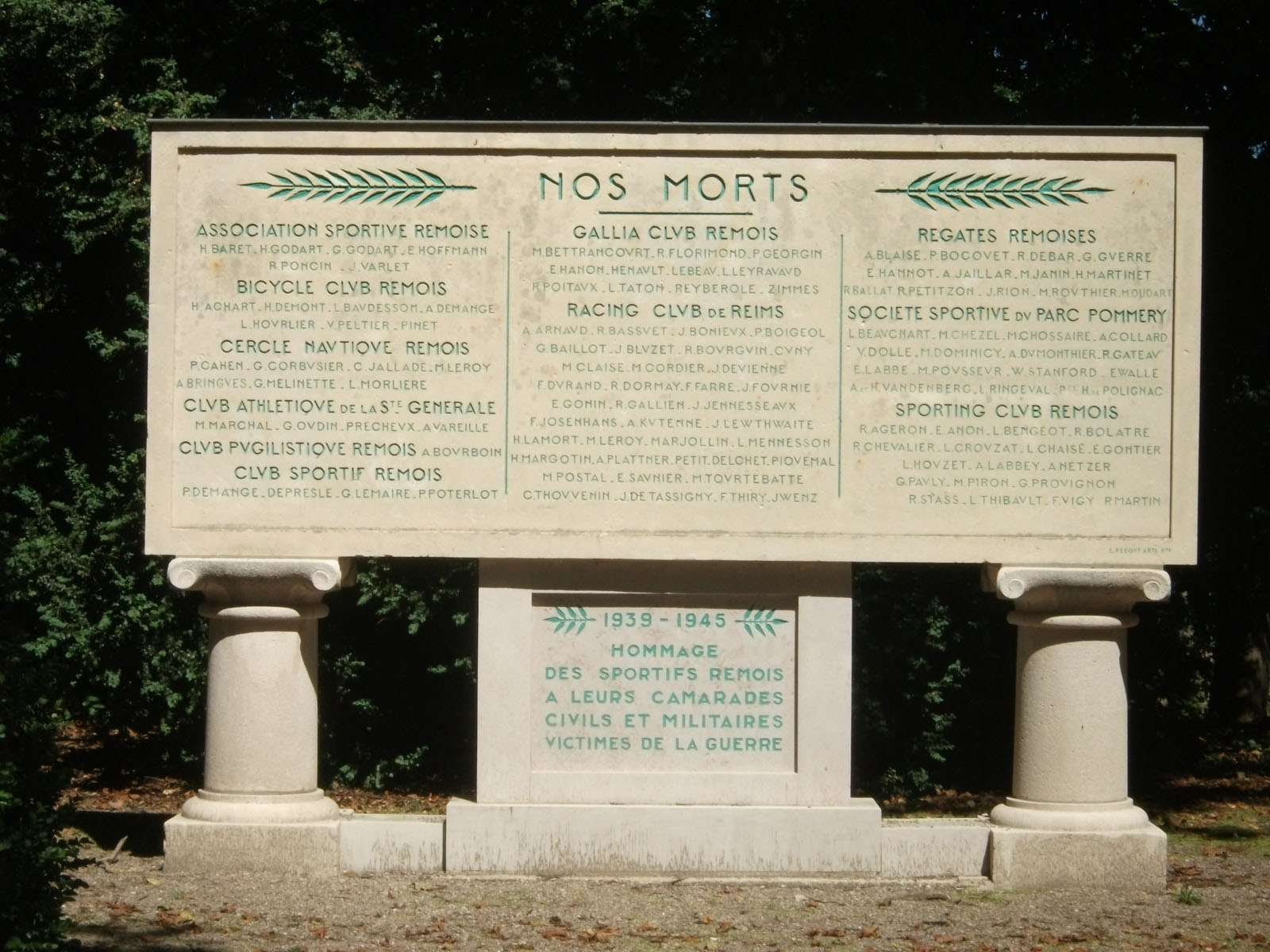
A memorial for members of the club killed during the First World War, Parc de Champagne.

The club has six main squads, or sections: competitive (compétition), leisure (loisir), Masters (Vétéran), junior (scolaires), para-rowing (sport santé, sport adapté, handisport), and indoor rowing (Avifit).
