= Hans Bourquin =

Swiss rowing coxswain

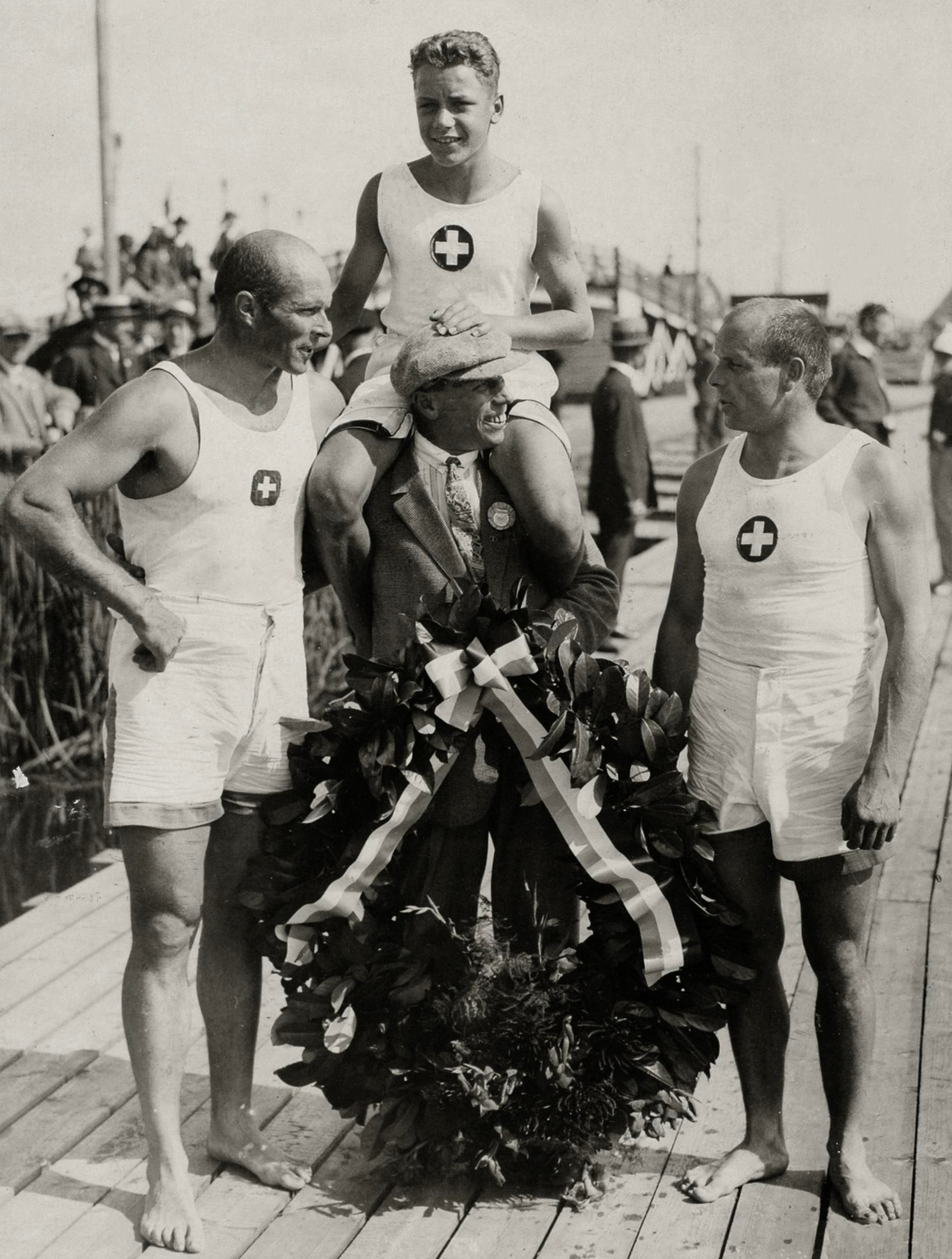
- Hans Bourquin (middle) at the 1928 Olympics

Personal information
- Born: 30 May 1914
- Died: November 1997 (aged 83)

Sport
- Sport: Rowing
- Club: Seeclub Biel
Medal record
Representing Switzerland
Olympic Games
Gold medal – first place	1928 Amsterdam	Coxed pair

Hans Bourquin (30 May 1914 – November 1997) was a Swiss rowing coxswain who won the gold medal in the coxed pairs at the 1928 Summer Olympics, aged 13.
